= KSN =

KSN may refer to:

- KSNF, a television station (channel 16) licensed to Joplin, Missouri, United States
- KSNT, a television station (channel 27 digital/virtual) licensed to Topeka, Kansas, United States
- The Kansas State Network and its five component stations:
  - KSNW, a television station (channel 3 virtual/45 digital) licensed to Wichita, Kansas, United States
  - KSNL-LD - a television repeater station (channel 47 digital) licensed to Salina, Kansas, United States
  - KSNC - a television station (channel 22 digital/2 virtual) licensed to Great Bend, Kansas, United States
  - KSNG - a television station (channel 11 digital/virtual) licensed to Garden City, Kansas, United States
  - KSNK - a television station (channel 8 virtual/12 digital) licensed to McCook, Nebraska, United States
- Kearsney railway station, a railway station in Dover, Kent, England
- Kostanay Airport, an airport in Kazakhstan
