= List of NBC television affiliates =

The following is a list of affiliates for NBC, a television network based in the United States. All affiliates owned by the network's NBC Owned Television Stations division are owned-and-operated stations.

Stations are listed in alphabetical order by state, district or territory and media market.

== Affiliate stations ==
NBC television network affiliates
Media market	State/Dist./Terr.	Station	Channel	Year affiliated	Ownership	Notes
Birmingham	Alabama	WVTM-TV	13	1965	Hearst Television	
Dothan	Alabama	WRGX-LD	23	2013	Gray Media	
Huntsville	Alabama	WAFF	48	1977	Gray Media	
Montgomery	Alabama	WSFA	12	1954	Gray Media	
Anchorage	Alaska	KTUU-TV	2	1971	Gray Media	
Fairbanks	Alaska	KTVF	11	1996	Gray Media	
Juneau	Alaska	KATH-LD	5	1998	Gray Media	
Sitka–Ketchikan	Alaska	KSCT-LD	2	1998	Gray Media	(Note: Satellite of KATH-LD.)
Sitka–Ketchikan	Alaska	KUBD	2	1998	Gray Media	
Pago Pago	American Samoa	KVZK-TV	5	2015	Government of American Samoa	(Note: Satellite of KHNL.)
Flagstaff	Arizona	KNAZ-TV	2	1970	Nexstar Media Group	(Note: Satellite of KPNX.)
Phoenix	Arizona	KPNX	12	1953	Nexstar Media Group	
Tucson	Arizona	KVOA	4	1953	Allen Media Broadcasting	
Yuma	Arizona	KYMA-DT	11.1	2020	Rincon Broadcasting Group	(Note: Operated by News-Press & Gazette Company.)
Fayetteville	Arkansas	KNWA-TV	51	1989	Nexstar Media Group	
Fort Smith	Arkansas	KFTA-TV	24.2	2006	Nexstar Media Group	
Jonesboro	Arkansas	KAIT	8.2	2015	Gray Media	
Little Rock	Arkansas	KARK-TV	4	1954	Nexstar Media Group	
Bakersfield	California	KGET-TV	17	1984	Nexstar Media Group	
Chico–Redding	California	KNVN	24	1985	Maxair Media	(Note: Operated by Allen Media Broadcasting.)
Eureka	California	KIEM-TV	3	1985	Marquee Broadcasting	
Fresno	California	KSEE	24	1953	Nexstar Media Group	
Los Angeles	California	KNBC	4	1949	NBC Owned Television Stations	
Monterey	California	KSBW-TV	8	1953	Hearst Television	
Palm Springs	California	KMIR-TV	36	1968	Entravision Communications	
Sacramento	California	KCRA-TV	3	1955	Hearst Television	
San Diego	California	KNSD	39	1977	NBC Owned Television Stations	
San Francisco	California	KNTV	11	2001	NBC Owned Television Stations	
San Luis Obispo	California	KSBY	6	1964	E. W. Scripps Company	
Colorado Springs	Colorado	KOAA-TV	5	1953	E. W. Scripps Company	
Denver	Colorado	KUSA-TV	9	1995	Nexstar Media Group	
Grand Junction	Colorado	KKCO	11	1996	E. W. Scripps Company	
Hartford–New Haven	Connecticut	WVIT	30	1953	NBC Owned Television Stations	
Washington	District of Columbia	WRC-TV	4	1947	NBC Owned Television Stations	
Fort Myers	Florida	WBBH-TV	20	1968	Hearst Television	
Gainesville	Florida	WGFL	28.3	2025	Sinclair Broadcast Group	
Jacksonville	Florida	WTLV	12	1988	Nexstar Media Group	
Miami–Fort Lauderdale	Florida	WTVJ	6	1989	NBC Owned Television Stations	
Orlando	Florida	WESH	2	1957	Hearst Television	
Panama City	Florida	WJHG-TV	7	1982	Gray Media	
Pensacola	Florida	WEAR-TV	3.2	2025	Sinclair Broadcast Group	
Tallahassee	Florida	WTWC-TV	40	1983	Sinclair Broadcast Group	
Tampa	Florida	WFLA-TV	8	1955	Nexstar Media Group	
West Palm Beach	Florida	WPTV-TV	5	1954	E. W. Scripps Company	
Albany	Georgia	WALB-TV	10	1954	Gray Media	
Atlanta	Georgia	WXIA-TV	11	1980	Nexstar Media Group	
Augusta	Georgia	WAGT-CD	26	2017	Gray Media	
Columbus	Georgia	WLTZ	38	1970	Gray Media	
Macon	Georgia	WMGT-TV	41	1968	Morris Multimedia	
Savannah	Georgia	WSAV-TV	3	1985	Nexstar Media Group	
Hagåtña	Guam	KUAM-TV	8	1956	Pacific Telestations, Inc.	
Hilo	Hawaii	KSIX-TV	13	1996	Gray Media	
Honolulu	Hawaii	KHNL	13	1996	Gray Media	
Wailuku	Hawaii	KOGG	13	1996	Gray Media	
Boise	Idaho	KTVB	7	1953	Nexstar Media Group	
Idaho Falls	Idaho	KPVI-DT	6	1996	Deltavision Media	
Twin Falls	Idaho	KTFT-LD	7	1986	Nexstar Media Group	(Note: Satellite of KTVB.)
Champaign–Springfield	Illinois	WAND	17	2005	Gray Media	
Chicago	Illinois	WMAQ-TV	5	1948	NBC Owned Television Stations	
Peoria	Illinois	WEEK-TV	25	1953	Gray Media	
Quincy	Illinois	WGEM-TV	10	1953	Gray Media	
Rockford	Illinois	WREX	13	1995	Gray Media	
Evansville	Indiana	WFIE	14	1953	Gray Media	
Fort Wayne	Indiana	WPTA	21.2	2016	Gray Media	
Indianapolis	Indiana	WTHR	13	1979	Nexstar Media Group	
Lafayette	Indiana	WPBI-CD	16.2	2016	Coastal Television Broadcasting Company	
South Bend	Indiana	WNDU-TV	16	1955	Gray Media	
Terre Haute	Indiana	WTWO	2	1965	Nexstar Media Group	
Cedar Rapids	Iowa	KWWL-TV	7	1953	Allen Media Broadcasting	
Davenport	Iowa	KWQC-TV	6	1949	Gray Media	
Des Moines	Iowa	WHO-DT	13	1954	Nexstar Media Group	
Ottumwa	Iowa	KYOU-TV	15.2	2018	Gray Media	
Sioux City	Iowa	KTIV	4	1954	Gray Media	
Garden City	Kansas	KSNG	11	1958	Nexstar Media Group	(Note: Satellite of KSNW.)
Goodland	Kansas	KSNK	8	1959	Nexstar Media Group	
Hays	Kansas	KSNC	2	1954	Nexstar Media Group	
Salina	Kansas	KSNL-LD	6	1964	Nexstar Media Group	
Topeka	Kansas	KSNT	27	1967	Nexstar Media Group	
Wichita	Kansas	KSNW	3	1956	Nexstar Media Group	
Bowling Green	Kentucky	WNKY	40	2001	Marquee Broadcasting	
Lexington	Kentucky	WLEX-TV	18	1955	E. W. Scripps Company	
Louisville	Kentucky	WAVE	3	1948	Gray Media	
Paducah	Kentucky	WPSD-TV	6	1957	Paxton Media Group	
Alexandria	Louisiana	KALB-TV	5	1954	Gray Media	
Baton Rouge	Louisiana	WVLA-TV	33	1977	White Knight Broadcasting	(Note: Operated by Nexstar Media Group.)
Lafayette	Louisiana	KLAF-LD	14	2015	Gray Media	
Lake Charles	Louisiana	KPLC	7	1954	Gray Media	
Monroe	Louisiana	KTVE	10	1981	Mission Broadcasting	
New Orleans	Louisiana	WDSU	6	1948	Hearst Television	
Shreveport	Louisiana	KTAL-TV	6	1961	Nexstar Media Group	
Bangor	Maine	WLBZ	2	1959	Nexstar Media Group	(Note: Semi-satellite of WCSH.)
Portland	Maine	WCSH-TV	6	1953	Nexstar Media Group	
Presque Isle	Maine	WWPI-LD	16	2020	Gray Media	
Baltimore	Maryland	WBAL-TV	11	1995	Hearst Television	
Salisbury	Maryland	WRDE-LD	31	2014	Draper Holdings Business Trust	
Boston	Massachusetts	WBTS-CD	15	2018	NBC Owned Television Stations	
Springfield	Massachusetts	WWLP	22	1953	Nexstar Media Group	
Alpena	Michigan	WBKB-TV	11.2	2022	Morgan Murphy Media	
Detroit	Michigan	WDIV-TV	4	1947	Graham Media Group	
Flint	Michigan	WSMH	66.2	2025	Sinclair Broadcast Group	
Grand Rapids	Michigan	WOOD-TV	8	1949	Nexstar Media Group	
Lansing	Michigan	WILX-TV	10	1959	Gray Media	
Marquette	Michigan	WLUC-TV	6	1995	Gray Media	
Sault Ste. Marie	Michigan	WGTQ	9.2	2014	Cunningham Broadcasting	(Note: Operated by Sinclair Broadcast Group.)
Sault Ste. Marie	Michigan	WTOM-TV	4	1959	Sinclair Broadcast Group	(Note: Satellite of WPBN-TV.)
Traverse City	Michigan	WGTU	28.2	2014	Cunningham Broadcasting	
Traverse City	Michigan	WPBN-TV	7	1954	Sinclair Broadcast Group	
Duluth	Minnesota	KBJR-TV	6	1955	Gray Media	
Hibbing	Minnesota	KRII	11	2002	Gray Media	(Note: Semi-satellite of KBJR-TV.)
Mankato	Minnesota	KMNF-LD	7	2019	Gray Media	
Minneapolis–Saint Paul	Minnesota	KARE	11	1979	Nexstar Media Group	
Rochester	Minnesota	KTTC	10	1953	Gray Media	
Biloxi	Mississippi	WXXV-TV	25.2	2012	Morris Multimedia	
Greenwood	Mississippi	WNBD-LD	33	2010	Deltavision Media	
Hattiesburg	Mississippi	WDAM-TV	7	1956	Gray Media	
Jackson	Mississippi	WLBT	3	1953	Gray Media	
Meridian	Mississippi	WGBC	30.2	2009	Coastal Television Broadcasting Company	
Tupelo	Mississippi	WTVA	9	1957	Gray Media	
Jefferson City	Missouri	KOMU-TV	8	1985	University of Missouri	
Joplin	Missouri	KSNF	16	1982	Nexstar Media Group	
Kansas City	Missouri	KSHB-TV	41	1994	E. W. Scripps Company	
Springfield	Missouri	KYTV	3	1953	Gray Media	
St. Joseph	Missouri	KNPG-CD	21	2016	News-Press & Gazette Company	
St. Louis	Missouri	KSDK	5	1947	Nexstar Media Group	
Billings	Montana	KULR-TV	8	1987	Cowles Company	
Bozeman	Montana	KDBZ-CD	29	1990	Sinclair Broadcast Group	(Note: Semi-satellite of KECI-TV.)
Butte	Montana	KTVM-TV	6	1965	Sinclair Broadcast Group	
Great Falls	Montana	KTGF-LD	50	2004	E. W. Scripps Company	(Note: Satellite of KTVH-DT.)
Helena	Montana	KTVH-DT	12	1958	E. W. Scripps Company	
Kalispell	Montana	KCFW-TV	9	1968	Sinclair Broadcast Group	
Missoula	Montana	KECI-TV	13	1965	Sinclair Broadcast Group	
Grand Island	Nebraska	KGIN	11.2	2019	Gray Media	(Note: Satellite of KSNB-TV.)
Lincoln	Nebraska	KSNB-TV	4	2014	Gray Media	
North Platte	Nebraska	KNOP-TV	2	1958	Gray Media	
Omaha	Nebraska	WOWT	6	1986	Gray Media	
Scottsbluff	Nebraska	KNEP	4	2022	Marquee Broadcasting	(Note: Semi-satellite of KNOP-TV.)
Las Vegas	Nevada	KSNV	3	1955	Sinclair Broadcast Group	
Reno	Nevada	KRXI-TV	11.2	2025	Sinclair Broadcast Group	
Albuquerque	New Mexico	KOB	4	1948	Hubbard Broadcasting	
Farmington	New Mexico	KOBF	12	1972	Hubbard Broadcasting	(Note: Satellite of KOB.)
Roswell	New Mexico	KOBR	8	1953	Hubbard Broadcasting	
Albany	New York	WNYT	13	1981	Hubbard Broadcasting	
Binghamton	New York	WBGH-CD	20	1997	Nexstar Media Group	
Buffalo	New York	WGRZ	2	1958	Nexstar Media Group	
Elmira	New York	WETM-TV	18	1956	Nexstar Media Group	
New York City	New York	WNBC	4	1941	NBC Owned Television Stations	
Rochester	New York	WHEC-TV	10	1989	Hubbard Broadcasting	
Syracuse	New York	WSTM-TV	3	1950	Sinclair Broadcast Group	
Utica	New York	WKTV	2	1949	Heartland Media	
Watertown	New York	WVNC-LD	45	2016	SagamoreHill Broadcasting	
Charlotte	North Carolina	WCNC-TV	36	1978	Nexstar Media Group	
Greensboro	North Carolina	WXII-TV	12	1953	Hearst Television	
Greenville	North Carolina	WITN-TV	7	1955	Gray Media	
Raleigh–Durham	North Carolina	WRAL-TV	5	2016	Capitol Broadcasting Company	
Wilmington	North Carolina	WECT	6	1954	Gray Media	
Bismarck	North Dakota	KFYR-TV	5	1953	Gray Media	
Dickinson	North Dakota	KQCD-TV	7	1980	Gray Media	(Note: Semi-satellite of KFYR-TV.)
Fargo	North Dakota	KVLY-TV	11	1983	Gray Media	
Minot	North Dakota	KMOT	10	1958	Gray Media	
Williston	North Dakota	KUMV-TV	8	1957	Gray Media	(Note: Semi-satellite of KMOT.)
Cincinnati	Ohio	WLWT	5	1948	Hearst Television	
Cleveland	Ohio	WKYC	3	1948	Nexstar Media Group	
Columbus	Ohio	WCMH-TV	4	1949	Nexstar Media Group	
Dayton	Ohio	WDTN	2	2004	Nexstar Media Group	
Lima	Ohio	WLIO	8	1953	Gray Media	
Toledo	Ohio	WNWO-TV	24	1995	Sinclair Broadcast Group	
Youngstown	Ohio	WFMJ-TV	21	1953	Vindicator Printing Company	
Zanesville	Ohio	WHIZ-TV	18	1953	Marquee Broadcasting	
Oklahoma City	Oklahoma	KFOR-TV	4	1949	Nexstar Media Group	
Tulsa	Oklahoma	KJRH-TV	2	1954	E. W. Scripps Company	
Bend	Oregon	KTVZ	21	1977	News-Press & Gazette Company	
Coos Bay	Oregon	KMCB	23	1991	Roberts Media	(Note: Satellite of KMTR.)
Eugene	Oregon	KMTR	16	1982	Roberts Media	
Klamath Falls	Oregon	KOTI	2	1983	California Oregon Broadcasting, Inc.	(Note: Satellite of KOBI.)
Medford	Oregon	KOBI	5	1983	California Oregon Broadcasting, Inc.	
Portland	Oregon	KGW	8	1959	Nexstar Media Group	
Roseburg	Oregon	KTCW	46	1992	Roberts Media	
Erie	Pennsylvania	WICU-TV	12	1963	Lilly Broadcasting	
Harrisburg	Pennsylvania	WGAL	8	1949	Hearst Television	
Johnstown	Pennsylvania	WJAC-TV	6	1949	Sinclair Broadcast Group	
Philadelphia	Pennsylvania	WCAU	10	1995	NBC Owned Television Stations	
Pittsburgh	Pennsylvania	WPXI	11	1957	Cox Media Group	
Scranton	Pennsylvania	WBRE-TV	28	1953	Nexstar Media Group	
San Juan	Puerto Rico	WKAQ-TV	2.3	2014	NBC Owned Television Stations	(Note: Satellite of WNBC.)
Providence	Rhode Island	WJAR	10	1949	Sinclair Broadcast Group	
Charleston	South Carolina	WCBD-TV	2	1996	Nexstar Media Group	
Columbia	South Carolina	WIS	10	1953	Gray Media	
Greenville	South Carolina	WYFF	4	1953	Hearst Television	
Myrtle Beach	South Carolina	WMBF-TV	32	2008	Gray Media	
Mitchell	South Dakota	KDLV-TV	5	1998	Gray Media	(Note: Satellite of KDLT-TV.)
Rapid City	South Dakota	KNBN	21	2000	Forum Communications Company	
Sioux Falls	South Dakota	KDLT-TV	46	1983	Gray Media	
Chattanooga	Tennessee	WRCB	3	1956	Sarkes Tarzian, Inc.	
Jackson	Tennessee	WNBJ-LD	39	2014	SagamoreHill Broadcasting	(Note: Operated by Coastal Television Broadcasting Company.)
Johnson City	Tennessee	WCYB-TV	5	1956	Sinclair Broadcast Group	
Knoxville	Tennessee	WBIR-TV	10	1988	Nexstar Media Group	
Memphis	Tennessee	WMC-TV	5	1948	Gray Media	
Nashville	Tennessee	WSMV-TV	4	1950	Gray Media	
Abilene	Texas	KRBC-TV	9	1953	Mission Broadcasting	
Amarillo	Texas	KAMR-TV	4	1953	Nexstar Media Group	
Austin	Texas	KXAN-TV	36	1966	Nexstar Media Group	
Beaumont–Port Arthur	Texas	KBMT	12.2	2009	Nexstar Media Group	
Bryan	Texas	KAGS-LD	23	2003	Nexstar Media Group	(Note: Semi-satellite of KCEN-TV.)
Corpus Christi	Texas	KRIS-TV	6	1956	E. W. Scripps Company	
El Paso	Texas	KTSM-TV	9	1953	Nexstar Media Group	
Fort Worth–Dallas	Texas	KXAS-TV	5	1948	NBC Owned Television Stations	
Harlingen	Texas	KVEO-TV	23	1981	Nexstar Media Group	
Houston	Texas	KPRC-TV	2	1949	Graham Media Group	
Laredo	Texas	KGNS-TV	8	1956	Gray Media	
Lubbock	Texas	KCBD	11	1953	Gray Media	
Midland–Odessa	Texas	KWES-TV	9	1982	Nexstar Media Group	
San Angelo	Texas	KSAN-TV	3	1962	Mission Broadcasting	
San Antonio	Texas	WOAI-TV	4	1949	Sinclair Broadcast Group	
Sherman	Texas	KTEN	10	1977	Lockwood Broadcast Group	
Tyler	Texas	KETK-TV	56	1987	Nexstar Media Group	
Victoria	Texas	KMOL-LD	17	2004	Morgan Murphy Media	
Waco	Texas	KCEN-TV	6	1985	Nexstar Media Group	
Wichita Falls	Texas	KFDX-TV	3	1953	Nexstar Media Group	
Charlotte Amalie	U.S. Virgin Islands	WVGN-LD	19	2004	Lilly Broadcasting	
Salt Lake City	Utah	KSL-TV	5	1995	Bonneville International	
Burlington	Vermont	WPTZ	5	1954	Hearst Television	
Charlottesville	Virginia	WVIR-TV	29	1973	Gray Media	
Charlottesville	Virginia	WVIR-CD	29	2019	Gray Media	(Note: Translator of WVIR-TV.)
Harrisonburg	Virginia	WHSV-TV	3.2	2019	Gray Media	(Note: Translator for WSVW-LD.)
Harrisonburg	Virginia	WSVW-LD	30	2019	Gray Media	
Norfolk	Virginia	WAVY-TV	10	1959	Nexstar Media Group	
Richmond	Virginia	WWBT	12	1965	Gray Media	
Roanoke	Virginia	WSLS-TV	10	1952	Graham Media Group	
Kennewick	Washington	KNDU	25	1965	Cowles Company	(Note: Semi-satellite of KNDO.)
Seattle	Washington	KING-TV	5	1959	Nexstar Media Group	
Spokane	Washington	KHQ-TV	6	1952	Cowles Company	
Yakima	Washington	KNDO	23	1965	Cowles Company	
Bluefield	West Virginia	WVVA	6	1955	Gray Media	
Clarksburg	West Virginia	WBOY-TV	12	1957	Nexstar Media Group	
Huntington–Charleston	West Virginia	WSAZ-TV	3	1949	Gray Media	
Parkersburg	West Virginia	WTAP-TV	15	1953	Gray Media	
Wheeling	West Virginia	WTOV-TV	9	1980	Sinclair Broadcast Group	
Eau Claire	Wisconsin	WEAU	13	1953	Gray Media	
Green Bay	Wisconsin	WGBA-TV	26	1995	E. W. Scripps Company	
Madison	Wisconsin	WMTV	15	1953	Gray Media	
Milwaukee	Wisconsin	WTMJ-TV	4	1947	E. W. Scripps Company	
Wausau	Wisconsin	WJFW-TV	12	1966	Rockfleet Broadcasting	
Casper	Wyoming	KCWY-DT	13	2003	Marquee Broadcasting	
Cheyenne	Wyoming	KGWN-TV	5.2	2019	Marquee Broadcasting	

== See also ==
- List of American Broadcasting Company television affiliates
- List of CBS television affiliates
- List of Fox Broadcasting Company affiliates
- List of PBS member stations
- List of The CW affiliates
