= New Vision Television =

American broadcasting company

- Company type: Private
- Industry: Broadcast and Digital
- Founded: 1993
- Defunct: October 12, 2012
- Fate: Acquired by LIN TV Corp.
- Successor: LIN Media; Media General; Nexstar Media Group
- Headquarters: Los Angeles, California, United States
- Key people: Jason Elkin; Chairman / CEO
- Services: Television stations, Digital media
- Number of employees: 1550

New Vision Television was a broadcast company based in Los Angeles, California. Throughout its two decade plus history, the company owned or managed over 50 television stations in large and medium-sized markets.

== History ==
=== New Vision I ===
Formed by Jason Elkin in 1993 in Atlanta, Georgia, New Vision Television began its ownership in local television by acquiring the News-Press & Gazette Company's stations in December 1993 for $110 million. The deal included television stations in Jackson, Mississippi (WJTV, including semi-satellite WHLT in Hattiesburg); Wilmington, North Carolina (WECT), Savannah, Georgia (WSAV-TV), Sioux Falls, South Dakota (KSFY-TV and satellites KABY-TV and KPRY-TV), and Tucson, Arizona (KOLD-TV). New Vision I sold its assets to Bert Ellis and Ellis Communications in 1995 for $230 million.

=== New Vision II ===
New Vision Television CEO Jason Elkin and COO John Heinen started a new company, New Vision Television II, that capitalized with $200 million and owned a maximum of four network affiliates. (Elkin had bought the stations from NPG that were sold to Ellis.) New Vision II owned KSBY in Santa Barbara, California; KVII-TV in Amarillo, Texas; WISE-TV in Fort Wayne, Indiana; and KDLH in Duluth, Minnesota. In 2005, New Vision II sold all of its stations at the time to Cordillera Communications, Barrington Broadcasting, and Granite Broadcasting.

=== New Vision III ===
New Vision III was a restart of the company with new stations. On August 1, 2006, New Vision announced an agreement to acquire CBS affiliates WIAT in Birmingham, Alabama; and KIMT in Mason City, Iowa, from Media General for $35 million. The acquisition was finalized on October 12 of that year. On November 15, New Vision announced an agreement to acquire CBS affiliate WKBN-TV and sister Fox affiliate WYFX-LP in Youngstown, Ohio, for undisclosed terms, and signed a shared services agreement to operate Youngstown ABC affiliate WYTV for owner Parkin Broadcasting (later named PBC Broadcasting). New Vision subsequently launched the My Valley branding for several services offered by WKBN, WYFX, and WYTV. In September 2007, New Vision acquired Savannah, Georgia, ABC affiliate WJCL from Piedmont Television; in November, it acquired all of the assets of Montecito Broadcasting: KOIN in Portland, Oregon; KHON-TV in Honolulu, Hawaii, and satellites; KSNW in Wichita, Kansas, and satellites; and (in a related stock transaction) KSNT in Topeka, Kansas. In 2008, New Vision bought KTMJ-CA and repeaters in Topeka (co-managed with KSNT) and announced plans to convert KBNZ-LD in Bend, Oregon (which has since been sold), from a translator of KOIN to its own station.

In 2009, New Vision Television received a $28 million line of credit during its bankruptcy proceedings. New Vision, doing business as NV Broadcasting, filed for Chapter 11 after reaching an agreement with first- and second-lien debt holders that converts $400 million in debt to equity in the reorganized company.

On May 7, 2012, LIN Media acquired the 13 television stations owned by New Vision Television. The sale provided a significant gain in equity for New Vision’s investors. The sales agreement included operational control of the three PBC Broadcasting-owned stations (KTKA, WTGS and WYTV) involved in shared service agreements with New Vision-owned stations in Topeka, Savannah and Youngstown (the licenses of the PBC stations are being transferred to Vaughan Media as part of the deal). The FCC approved the deal on October 2, 2012, and was completed on October 12, 2012. LIN was itself absorbed by Media General in late 2014; Media General would then be absorbed to Nexstar Media Group in 2017.

== Former stations ==
- Stations are arranged in alphabetical order by state and city of license.

Stations owned by New Vision Television
| Media market | State | Station | Purchased | Sold | Notes |
|---|---|---|---|---|---|
| Birmingham | Alabama | WIAT | 2006 | 2012 | |
| Tucson | Arizona | KOLD-TV | 1993 | 1995 | |
| San Luis Obispo | California | KSBY | 2002 | 2004 | |
| Savannah | Georgia | WSAV-TV | 1993 | 1995 | |
| Savannah | Georgia | WJCL | 2007 | 2012 | |
| Savannah | Georgia | WTGS | 2007 | 2012 | (Note: Owned by a third party and operated by New Vision.) |
| Honolulu | Hawaii | KHON-TV | 2007 | 2012 | |
| Hilo | Hawaii | KHAW-TV | 2007 | 2012 | (Note: Satellite of KHON-TV.) |
| Kauai | Hawaii | K55DZ | 2007 | 2012 | (Note: Translator of KHON-TV.) |
| Wailuku | Hawaii | KAII-TV | 2007 | 2012 | |
| Fort Wayne | Indiana | WISE-TV | 2003 | 2005 | |
| Mason City | Iowa | KIMT | 2006 | 2012 | |
| Garden City | Kansas | KSNG | 2007 | 2012 | (Note: Satellite of KSNW.) |
| Great Bend | Kansas | KSNC | 2007 | 2012 | |
| Topeka | Kansas | KSNT | 2007 | 2012 | |
| Topeka | Kansas | KTMJ-CD | 2008 | 2012 | |
| Topeka | Kansas | KTKA-TV | 2011 | 2012 | |
| Salina | Kansas | KSNL-LD | 2007 | 2012 | |
| Wichita | Kansas | KSNW | 2007 | 2012 | |
| Duluth | Minnesota | KDLH | 2003 | 2005 | |
| Hattiesburg | Mississippi | WHLT | 1993 | 1995 | (Note: Semi-satellite of WJTV.) |
| Jackson | Mississippi | WJTV | 1993 | 1995 | |
| McCook | Nebraska | KSNK | 2007 | 2012 | |
| Clovis | New Mexico | KVIH-TV | 2002 | 2005 | (Note: Satellite of KVII-TV.) |
| Wilmington | North Carolina | WECT | 1993 | 1995 | |
| Youngstown | Ohio | WKBN-TV | 2007 | 2012 | |
| Youngstown | Ohio | WYFX-LD | 2007 | 2012 | |
| Youngstown | Ohio | WYTV | 2007 | 2012 | |
| Bend | Oregon | KBNZ-LD | 2007 | 2010 | (Note: Satellite of KOIN.) |
| Portland | Oregon | KOIN | 2007 | 2012 | |
| Aberdeen | South Dakota | KABY-TV | 1993 | 1995 | (Note: Satellite of KSFY-TV.) |
| Pierre | South Dakota | KPRY-TV | 1993 | 1995 | |
| Sioux Falls | South Dakota | KSFY-TV | 1993 | 1995 | |
| Amarillo | Texas | KVII-TV | 2002 | 2005 | |
