= NBC 8 =

NBC 8 may refer to one of the following television stations in the United States:

== Current affiliates ==
- KAIT-DT2, Jonesboro, Arkansas
- KGNS-TV, Laredo, Texas
- KGW, Portland, Oregon
- KOBR, Roswell, New Mexico
  - Satellite of KOB in Albuquerque
- KOMU-TV, Columbia/Jefferson City Missouri
- KSBW, Monterey/Salinas/Santa Cruz, California
- KSNK, McCook, NE
  - Re-broadcasts KSNW in Wichita, Kansas
- KULR-TV, Billings, Montana
- KUAM-TV, Hagåtña, Guam
- WFLA-TV, Tampa, Florida
- WGAL-TV, Lancaster, Pennsylvania
- WLIO, Lima, Ohio
- WOOD-TV, Grand Rapids, Michigan

== Formerly affiliated ==
- KHNL, Honolulu, Hawaii (was branded as NBC 8 from 1996 to 2009)
- KIFI-TV, Pocatello/Idaho Falls, Idaho (1961 to 1996)
- PJA-TV, Oranjestad, Aruba (1996 to 2016)
- WAGM-TV, Presque Isle, Maine (primarily affiliation from 1957 to 1959)
- WBGH-CD, Binghamton, New York (was on channel 8 from 1997 to 2001)
- WDAZ-TV, Grand Forks, North Dakota (1967 to 1983 via WDAY-TV in Fargo)
- WFAA, Dallas, Texas (1950 to 1957)
- WROC-TV, Rochester, New York (1962 to 1989)
- WXEX-TV (now WRIC-TV), Richmond, Virginia (1955 to 1965)
- WYCN-LD, Boston, Massachusetts (2016 to 2019)
