= KODE-TV =

Television station in Joplin, Missouri

- Joplin, Missouri; Pittsburg, Kansas; United States
- City: Joplin, Missouri
- Channels: Digital: 23 (UHF); Virtual: 12
- Branding: KODE 12 (call letters are pronounced individually); KODE 12 News

Programming
- Affiliations: 12.1: ABC; for others, see § Subchannels

Ownership
- Owner: Mission Broadcasting, Inc.
- Operator: Nexstar Media Group via JSA/SSA
- Sister stations: KSNF

History
- First air date: September 26, 1954
- Former call signs: KSWM-TV (1954–1957)
- Former channel numbers: Analog: 12 (VHF, 1954–2009); Digital: 43 (UHF, 2003–2019)
- Former affiliations: CBS (1954–1968); ABC (secondary, 1954–1968)
- Call sign meaning: Sounds like the word "code", though not pronounced that way on air

Technical information
- Licensing authority: FCC
- Facility ID: 18283
- ERP: 700 kW
- HAAT: 321.9 m (1,056 ft)
- Transmitter coordinates: 37°4′33″N 94°33′17″W

Links
- Public license information: Public file; LMS
- Website: www.fourstateshomepage.com

KODE-TV (channel 12) is a television station licensed to Joplin, Missouri, United States, serving as the ABC affiliate for the Joplin, Missouri–Pittsburg, Kansas television market. It is owned by Mission Broadcasting and operated by Nexstar Media Group alongside NBC affiliate KSNF (channel 16). The two stations share studios on South Cleveland Avenue in Joplin, where KODE-TV's transmitter is also located.

== History ==
The station began broadcasting on September 26, 1954, as KSWM-TV (for Southwestern Missouri) and was a primary CBS affiliate, but shared ABC with then-NBC affiliate KOAM-TV. It was locally founded by Austin Harrison who also owned radio station KSWM (1230 AM; now KZYM). It originally operated from studios and transmitter located on West 13th Street in Joplin. Harrison sold his stations to Friendly Broadcasting, owners of WSTV (now WTOV-TV) in Steubenville, Ohio, in 1956. In 1957, the call letters were changed to KODE-AM-TV. Friendly then sold both KODE and WRGP (now WRCB) in Chattanooga, Tennessee, to Massachusetts-based United Printers & Publishers in 1961. Gilmore Broadcasting of Kalamazoo, Michigan, bought the KODE stations in 1962.

KODE became a sole ABC affiliate on January 1, 1968, and three days later KUHI-TV (now NBC-affiliated KSNF) started and took over the CBS affiliation.

On March 15, 1970, KODE weatherman Lee George would make a major blunder on his daily forecast, where a prediction of light flurries for the next day instead turned into a snowstorm, with over 20 inches (51 cm) falling at the official measuring station at Joplin Regional Airport and 30 inches (76 cm) across portions of the Ozarks, with the station receiving viewer criticism to the point local police had to escort George to the station due to death threats. George swore to never use the word 'flurries' in another forecast, and future snowstorms in the area have been derisively known as 'Lee George flurries'.

KODE was acquired by Mission Broadcasting in 2002. Subsequently, KODE then entered into a shared services agreement with Nexstar Broadcasting, which owns NBC affiliate KSNF. The same year, it was announced KSNF and KODE would merge, with KSN's studios expanded to accommodate the combined operation.

On May 8, 2009, a powerful storm system slammed Joplin, knocking out power to KODE and knocking down the tower of sister station KSNF. KODE-TV returned to the air early on the morning of May 9, while KSNF did not return to the air until June 17. Both stations moved to a rebuilt KSNF building in April 2010 making it the next-to-last Nexstar duopoly to do so (as Nexstar formed a virtual duopoly in Evansville, Indiana, in December 2011 with the purchase of that market's ABC affiliate WEHT and transfer of its existing Evansville independent station (now CW affiliate) WTVW to Mission Broadcasting, and Nexstar almost immediately moved WTVW's operations to the WEHT facility).

On December 19, 2012, KODE began broadcasting its local newscasts in High Definition.

On June 15, 2016, Nexstar announced an affiliation agreement with Katz Broadcasting (now Scripps Networks) for Escape, Laff, Grit, and Bounce TV, including KODE-TV and KSNF. Ion Television was added to KODE-TV's subchannel map several years later.

== News operation ==
KODE-TV presently broadcasts 17 hours of local newscasts each week (with three hours each weekday and an hour each on Saturdays and Sundays).

=== Notable former on-air staff ===
- Jonathan Elias – reporter
- Robb Hanrahan
- Evan Rosen
- Marny Stanier

== Subchannels ==
The station's signal is multiplexed:

Subchannels of KODE-TV
Subchannel	Res.	Short name	Programming
12.1	720p	KODE-DT	ABC
12.2	480i	Grit	Grit
12.3	480i	Bounce	Bounce TV
12.4	480i	ION	Ion (4:3)
