= KTMJ =

KTMJ may refer to:

- KTMJ (FM), a defunct radio station (88.7 FM) formerly licensed to serve Burlington, Colorado, United States
- KTMJ-CD, a low-power television station (channel 20, virtual 43) licensed to serve Topeka, Kansas, United States
