= NBC 16 =

NBC 16 may refer to one of the following television stations in the United States:

== Current ==
- KMTR, Eugene, Oregon
- KSNF, Joplin, Missouri
- WNDU-TV, South Bend, Indiana
- WPBI-LD2, Lafayette, Indiana
- WWPI-LD, Fort Kent / Presque Isle, Maine

== Former ==
- KEDD-TV, Wichita, Kansas
- KTGF (now KJJC-TV), Great Falls, Montana
- K16BY (now KIVY-LD), Crockett, Texas
  - Was a translator for KETK-TV in Jacksonville / Tyler, Texas
