= Stanier =

Stanier is a surname. Notable people with the surname include:

- John Stanier (drummer) (born 1968), played with Helmet and others
- John Stanier (British Army officer) (1925–2007), head of the British Army
- Marny Stanier (born 1962), American TV meteorologist
- Roger Stanier (1916–1982), Canadian microbiologist
- William Stanier (1876–1965), Chief Mechanical Engineer of the London, Midland and Scottish Railway

== See also ==
- Stanier baronets, a UK baronetcy
