= Media General =

American media company

Media General, Inc.
- Type: Public
- Traded as: NYSE: MEG
- Industry: Broadcast and Digital
- Predecessor: Park Communications; Spartan Communications; Young Broadcasting; LIN Media
- Founded: 1940; 86 years ago
- Defunct: January 17, 2017; 9 years ago
- Fate: Merged with Nexstar Broadcasting Group
- Successor: BH Media (newspaper assets only); Nexstar Media Group (television assets only)
- Headquarters: Richmond, Virginia; New York, New York; Austin, Texas
- Key people: Warren Buffett (Financier); Mario Gabelli (Financier); J. Stewart Bryan III (chairman); Vincent L. Sadusky (president and CEO); Deborah A. McDermott (Chief Operating Officer); James F. Woodward (CFO)
- Products: Television; Internet; Newspaper
- Revenue: US$1.305 B (2015)
- Number of employees: 5,400 (2015)
- Website: www.mediageneral.com

Media General, Inc. was an American media company based in Richmond, Virginia. The company's origins can be traced back to 1887 when Richmond attorney Joseph Bryan acquired The Richmond Daily Times, which later became The Richmond Times-Dispatch. Joseph Bryan's son, John Stewart Bryan succeeded his father as owner and publisher of the Times-Dispatch, which merged with The Richmond News Leader in 1940 to form Richmond Newspapers, Inc.

After John Stewart Bryan died in 1944, his son, D. Tennant Bryan led the company into a period of expansion into television, changing the company's name to Media General in 1969. Media General, Inc. began trading on the American Stock Exchange in 1970.

In 1990, J. Stewart Bryan III, great-grandson of Joseph Bryan, became chairman, president and chief executive officer of Media General. The fourth-generation Bryan oversaw the company's expansion into digital media and the sale of Media General's newspaper division to Berkshire Hathaway in 2012. J. Stewart Bryan III remained chairman of Media General until his death on January 23, 2016.

In 2013 and 2014, Media General expanded significantly through mergers with Young Broadcasting and LIN Media. After the latter merger, LIN Media CEO Vincent L. Sadusky became chief executive officer of Media General while former Young Broadcasting CEO Deborah A. McDermott led station operations as Chief Operating Officer. Long-time Media General CFO James F. Woodward remained as Chief Financial Officer until the company's dissolution in 2017.

On January 11, 2017, the FCC approved the sale of Media General to Nexstar Broadcasting Group for $4.6 billion.

== History ==
The conglomeration of newspapers was founded in 1940 when owners of Richmond, Virginia's two newspapers, the Times-Dispatch and News Leader, merged them to form Richmond Newspapers, Inc. In 1966, it purchased a majority interest in the Tampa Tribune, which included WFLA-AM-FM-TV in Tampa, making that the company's first ever foray into television, a strategy that was later used by such acquisition practices. In 1969, as the company's media properties grew and diversified, it was renamed Media General.

=== Additional acquisitions ===
In 1981, the company began its expansion practice of television stations under the Media General Telecommunications subsidiary. It first purchased WJKS-TV in Jacksonville from Ziff-Davis Broadcasting on December 7, 1981, for $18 million. The sale was approved on November 8, 1982. On July 5, 1982, the company bought out WCBD-TV in Charleston from the State Telecasting Company for $8 million, the deal was approved on January 24, 1983.

In 1982 the company acquired The William B. Tanner Company (previously known as Pepper-Tanner), a commercial radio jingle production company headquartered in Memphis. It was divested in 1988. In 1987, Media General, which included its Media General Broadcast Group comprising three television stations at that time, as well as its cable systems in various areas was sold off to a group led by The Giant Group, a firm owned by Burt Sugarman, which purchased a stake for $103.8 million, with backing also held by television production company Barris Industries.

In 1996, Media General acquired Park Acquisitions, the holding company for Park Communications, formerly owned by the media entrepreneur Roy H. Park.

In 1999, Media General bought Spartanburg-based Spartan Communications, which increased Media General's station portfolio from 14 to 27.

Four NBC-owned stations in smaller markets were put up for sale on January 9, 2006. On April 6, NBC Owned Television Stations and Media General announced that the latter would purchase the four NBC O&O's as part of a $600 million four-station deal between the two companies.

=== Divestment of properties in the late 2000s ===
On July 28, 2006, Media General announced that it would sell KWCH-TV and its satellites to a Schurz Communications-affiliated company Sunflower Broadcasting for $73 million. On August 2, 2006, Media General announced that it would sell WIAT and KIMT to New Vision Television for $35 million; the sale was finalized on October 12, 2006. Between 2006 and 2008, Morris Network, a division of Morris Multimedia bought out two station properties, WDEF and WTVQ. The price for WDEF cost $22 million, and the latter's price for WTVQ-TV cost $16.5 million, totaling up to a $38.5 million budget for the combined two stations.

On October 29, 2007, Media General announced that the company was exploring the sale of WCWJ, KALB-TV, WMBB, and WNEG-TV. On March 14, 2008, the company reached an agreement to sell KALB and WMBB to Hoak Media. The deal was closed on July 16. On June 25, 2008, Media General announced the sale of WNEG-TV to the University of Georgia. On January 28, 2009, Nexstar Broadcasting Group announced that it had reached an agreement to purchase WCWJ. The deal was finalized on May 1, 2009.

=== 2010s: Expansions, mergers with Young Broadcasting and LIN Media ===
On June 6, 2013, Young Broadcasting announced that it would merge with Media General. On November 8, the FCC approved the merger. The merger closed on November 12. Following the merger, the new company was owned 67.5 percent by Young shareholders and 32.5 percent by Media General shareholders. The combined company owned 30 stations, reaching 14% of the United States. and continued to operate as Media General. Headquarters would remain in Richmond, Virginia, however, for the first time in over a century, the Bryan Family would not have a controlling interest in the company.

On March 21, 2014, Media General and LIN Media announced that the two companies would merge. The deal, worth an estimated $1.6 billion, would create an entity of 71 stations with a combined reach of 24% of U.S. television households. 45 Media General staff members were laid off; CEO George Mahoney stepped down in favor of his LIN counterpart Vincent Sadusky. In order to comply with FCC ownership rules as well as planned changes to rules regarding same-market television stations which would prohibit future joint sales agreements, some of the stations would be sold to several other companies in five markets (Birmingham, Green Bay, Mobile, Providence and Savannah) where both groups already own stations.

On August 20, 2014, Media General and LIN Media announced several sales. Media General sold WJAR, WLUK, WTGS and WCWF to the Sinclair Broadcast Group in exchange for Sinclair's KXRM, KXTU, WHTM and WTTA. Although the WHTM sale was discussed two months earlier, it was completed in September 2014; the rest of the transactions would not come into effect until the deal was completed. Hearst Television acquired WVTM and WJCL, and Meredith Corporation acquired WALA. On October 6, the two companies' shareholders approved the deal, and the FCC approved the deal on December 12. The merger was completed on December 19. A condition of the deal requires Media General to end the joint sales and shared services agreements it has with stations in Youngstown, Ohio, Dayton, Ohio, and Topeka, Kansas, due to tighter scrutiny such deals are getting by the FCC. Media General received a two-year waiver in those markets to end the JSAs and SSAs.

On July 14, 2015, Media General pulled its stations off of Mediacom cable systems across the United States due to a carriage dispute over retransmission consent fees. This carriage dispute saw Media General stations disappear from Mediacom lineups in 14 television markets across the United States and even three of the Fox affiliates owned by Media General were lost to Mediacom subscribers in Hampton Roads, Virginia, Terre Haute, Indiana, and Topeka, Kansas just before the start of the 2015 Major League Baseball All-Star Game. On July 30, 2015, Mediacom and Media General reached a new agreement, thereby restoring Media General owned stations to Mediacom subscribers in the affected areas.

On July 13, 2016, the FCC issued a $700,000 fine against Media General for using a shared services agreement with WAGT to prevent its new owner Gray Television from divesting it in the spectrum incentive auction.

=== Aborted merger with Meredith; acquisition by Nexstar ===
On September 8, 2015, it was announced that Media General would acquire Meredith Corporation in a cash and stock deal valued at $2.4 billion. Pending regulatory and shareholder approval, the deal was expected to be consummated in June 2016. The combined company was to be known as Meredith Media General, and become the third-largest owner of television stations in the United States—serving an estimated 30% of households. In order to comply with FCC regulations, some stations would have been sold to other companies in six markets where both groups already own stations (Greenville-Spartanburg, Hartford-New Haven, Mobile, Nashville, Portland (OR) and Springfield (MA)). Media General shareholders would have controlled 65% of the company, with Meredith shareholders holding 35%.

On September 28, it was revealed that Nexstar Broadcasting Group had made an unsolicited cash-and-stock offer for Media General, valued at $14.50 per-share. Following the announcement, Media General shareholders Oppenheimer Holdings (7% stake) and Starboard Capital (4.5% stake) opposed the Meredith merger in favor of selling to Nexstar. On October 6, 2015, the New York Post speculated that the deal had been called off, believing that the deal was unlikely to receive further shareholder support due to these objections. Both companies have denied that this was the case and reported that other major shareholders were backing the merger. Media General hired additional firms to evaluate the Nexstar bid. On November 16, Media General rejected the offer but agreed to negotiate after concluding its merger with Meredith.

On January 27, 2016, Media General announced that it had entered into a definitive agreement to be acquired by Nexstar in a deal valued at $17.14 per-share, valuing the company at $4.6 billion plus the assumption of $2.3 billion in debt. The combined company will be known as Nexstar Media Group and will own 171 stations, serving an estimated 39% of households. The company will pay Meredith a termination fee of $60 million and give Meredith the right of first refusal to acquire any broadcast or digital properties that may be divested during the merger (a clause that Meredith did not exercise). The deal also includes contingent value rights for Media General shareholders if it sells spectrum from its stations during the FCC's spectrum incentive auction.

The transaction was approved on January 11, 2017, with the sale consummated six days later, on January 17.

== Former assets ==
=== Newspapers ===
On May 17, 2012, it was announced that investment company Berkshire Hathaway would be acquiring Media General's newspaper division (excluding The Tampa Tribune). The newspapers were planned to be merged into Berkshire Hathaway's World Media Enterprises division, a sister company of its other newspaper holdings under the Omaha World-Herald. The deal closed June 25, 2012. Media General's chairman and former CEO, J. Stewart Bryan III said the company faced a choice: either sell its newspaper division or file for bankruptcy protection. The latter, he said, was "unacceptable". At the end of 2011, Media General had $658 million in debt. In October 2012, The Tampa Tribune and its associated print and digital products were acquired by Tampa Media Group, Inc., a new company formed by Revolution Capital Group.

=== Major newspapers ===
- Richmond Times-Dispatch
- The Tampa Tribune
- Winston-Salem Journal

=== Community newspapers ===
==== Alabama ====
- Dothan Eagle
- The Enterprise Ledger
- Opelika-Auburn News
- The Eufaula Tribune
- The Corner News

==== Florida ====
- (Brooksville) Hernando Today (associated with The Tampa Tribune)
- (Sebring) Highlands Today (associated with The Tampa Tribune)
- Jackson County Floridan (Marianna)
- CENTRO Tampa (Spanish-language weekly)
- (New Port Richey) The Suncoast News (associated with The Tampa Tribune)

==== North Carolina ====
- The (Eden) Daily News
- Hickory Daily Record
- The (Marion) McDowell News
- The (Madison) Messenger
- The (Morganton) News Herald
- The Reidsville Review
- Statesville Record & Landmark

==== South Carolina ====
- The Morning News (Florence) Daily Newspaper for Florence and the Pee Dee Region
- The News and Post (Lake City) – Weekly
- The Marion Star (Marion) – Weekly
- The Weekly Observer (Hemingway) – Weekly
- The Hartsville Messenger – Weekly

==== Virginia ====
- Amherst New Era-Progress
- Powhatan Today
- Midlothian Exchange
- Mechanicsville Local
- Goochland Gazette
- Bristol Herald Courier
- Culpeper Star-Exponent
- The (Charlottesville) Daily Progress
- Danville Register & Bee
- Nelson County Times
- The News & Advance (Lynchburg)
- The (Waynesboro) News Virginian
- News & Messenger (Manassas) (defunct)
- Richlands News-Press/Clinch Valley News
- The Richmond News Leader (defunct)
- Smyth News and Messenger (Marion)
- The Wytheville Enterprise
- Washington County News (Abingdon)
- Greene County Record
- Madison County Eagle
- Orange County Review

== Former stations ==
- Stations are arranged in alphabetical order by state and city of license.
- Two boldface asterisks appearing following a station's call letters (**) indicate a station built and signed on by Media General.

Stations owned by Media General
Media market	State	Station	Purchased	Sold	Notes
Birmingham	Alabama	WIAT	1997	2006	
Birmingham	Alabama	WIAT	2014	2017	
Birmingham	Alabama	WVTM-TV	2006	2014	
Montgomery	Alabama	WNCF	1997	1999	
Mobile	Alabama	WKRG-TV	2000	2017	
Mobile	Alabama	WFNA	2014	2017	
San Francisco	California	KRON-TV	2013	2017	
Colorado Springs–Pueblo	Colorado	KXRM-TV	2014	2017	
Colorado Springs–Pueblo	Colorado	KXTU-LD	2014	2017	
Durango	Colorado	KREZ-TV	2014	2017	(Note: Satellite of KRQE.)
New Haven–Hartford	Connecticut	WTNH	2014	2017	
New Haven–Hartford	Connecticut	WCTX	2014	2017	
Jacksonville	Florida	WJKS-TV	1982	2009	(Note: Known as WJWB from 1997 until 2006, and as WCWJ from 2006 onward.)
Panama City	Florida	WMBB	2000	2008	
Tampa–St. Petersburg	Florida	WFLA-TV **	1955	2017	(Note: Known as WXFL from 1983 to 1988.)
Tampa–St. Petersburg	Florida	WTTA	2014	2017	
Augusta	Georgia	WJBF	2000	2017	
Augusta	Georgia	WAGT	2010	2016	(Note: Owned by a third party and operated by Media General.)
Columbus	Georgia	WRBL	2000	2017	
Savannah	Georgia	WSAV-TV	1997	2017	
Toccoa	Georgia	WNEG-TV	2000	2008	
Honolulu	Hawaii	KHON-TV	2014	2017	
Hilo	Hawaii	KHAW-TV	2014	2017	(Note: Satellite of KHON-TV.)
Wailuku	Hawaii	KAII-TV	2014	2017	
Fort Wayne	Indiana	WANE-TV	2014	2017	
Indianapolis	Indiana	WISH-TV	2014	2017	
Indianapolis	Indiana	WNDY-TV	2014	2017	
Indianapolis	Indiana	WIIH-CD	2014	2017	(Note: Translator of WISH-TV.)
West Lafayette	Indiana	WLFI-TV	2014	2017	
Terre Haute	Indiana	WTHI-TV	2014	2017	
Davenport	Iowa	KWQC-TV	2013	2017	
Mason City	Iowa	KIMT	2000	2006	
Mason City	Iowa	KIMT	2014	2017	
Ensign–Dodge City	Kansas	KBSD-TV	2000	2006	(Note: Satellite of KWCH-TV.)
Garden City	Kansas	KSNG	2014	2017	(Note: Satellite of KSNW.)
Goodland	Kansas	KBSL-TV	2000	2006	
Great Bend	Kansas	KSNC	2014	2017	
Hays	Kansas	KBSH-TV	2000	2006	
Salina	Kansas	KSNL-LD	2014	2017	
Topeka	Kansas	KSNT	2014	2017	
Topeka	Kansas	KTMJ-CD	2014	2017	
Topeka	Kansas	KTKA-TV	2014	2017	
Wichita–Hutchinson	Kansas	KWCH-TV	2000	2006	
Wichita–Hutchinson	Kansas	KSNW	2014	2017	
Lexington	Kentucky	WTVQ-TV	1997	2008	
Alexandria	Louisiana	KALB-TV	1997	2008	
Lafayette	Louisiana	KLFY-TV	2013	2017	
Adams	Massachusetts	WCDC-TV	2013	2017	(Note: Satellite of WTEN.)
Springfield	Massachusetts	WWLP	2014	2017	
Springfield	Massachusetts	WFXQ-CD	2014	2017	(Note: Translator of WWLP.)
Battle Creek	Michigan	WOTV	2014	2017	
Grand Rapids	Michigan	WOOD-TV	2014	2017	
Grand Rapids	Michigan	WXSP-CD	2014	2017	
Lansing	Michigan	WLNS-TV	2013	2017	
Lansing	Michigan	WLAJ	2013	2017	
Jackson	Mississippi	WJTV	1997	2017	
Hattiesburg–Laurel	Mississippi	WHLT	1997	2017	(Note: Semi-satellite of WJTV.)
Albuquerque–Santa Fe	New Mexico	KRQE	2014	2017	
Albuquerque–Santa Fe	New Mexico	KASA-TV	2014	2017	
Albuquerque–Santa Fe	New Mexico	KWBQ	2014	2017	
Albuquerque–Santa Fe	New Mexico	KASY-TV	2014	2017	
Roswell	New Mexico	KBIM-TV	2014	2017	
Roswell	New Mexico	KRWB-TV	2014	2017	(Note: Satellite of KWBQ.)
McCook	Nebraska	KSNK	2014	2017	
Albany–Schenectady	New York	WTEN	2013	2017	
Albany–Schenectady	New York	WXXA-TV	2013	2017	
Buffalo	New York	WIVB-TV	2014	2017	
Buffalo	New York	WNLO	2014	2017	
Utica	New York	WUTR	1997	1997	
Greenville–New Bern	North Carolina	WNCT-TV	1997	2017	
Raleigh–Durham–Fayetteville	North Carolina	WNCN	2006	2017	
Columbus	Ohio	WCMH-TV	2006	2017	
Dayton–Springfield	Ohio	WDTN	2014	2017	
Dayton–Springfield	Ohio	WBDT	2014	2017	
Youngstown	Ohio	WYFX-LD	2014	2017	
Youngstown	Ohio	WKBN-TV	2014	2017	
Youngstown	Ohio	WYTV	2014	2017	
Portland	Oregon	KOIN	2014	2017	
Harrisburg	Pennsylvania	WHTM-TV	2014	2017	
Providence	Rhode Island	WJAR	2006	2014	
Providence	Rhode Island	WPRI-TV	2014	2017	
Providence	Rhode Island	WNAC-TV	2014	2017	
Charleston	South Carolina	WCBD-TV	1983	2017	
Florence–Myrtle Beach	South Carolina	WBTW	2000	2017	
Greenville–Spartanburg	South Carolina	WSPA-TV	2000	2017	
Greenville–Spartanburg	South Carolina	WYCW	2002	2017	(Note: Known as WASV-TV prior to 2006.)
Sioux Falls	South Dakota	KELO-TV	2013	2017	
Frorence–Aberdeen	South Dakota	KDLO-TV	2013	2017	(Note: Satellite of KELO-TV.)
Reliance–Pierre	South Dakota	KPLO-TV	2013	2017	
Rapid City	South Dakota	KCLO-TV	2013	2017	
Chattanooga	Tennessee	WDEF-TV	1997	2006	
Knoxville	Tennessee	WATE-TV	2013	2017	
Nashville	Tennessee	WKRN-TV	2013	2017	
Tri-Cities–Johnson City	Tennessee	WJHL-TV	1997	2017	
Austin	Texas	KXAN-TV	2014	2017	
Austin	Texas	KNVA	2014	2017	
Austin	Texas	KBVO-CD	2014	2017	(Note: Translator of KBVO.)
Llano	Texas	KBVO	2014	2017	
Norfolk–Portsmouth–Newport News	Virginia	WAVY-TV	2014	2017	
Norfolk–Portsmouth–Newport News	Virginia	WVBT	2014	2017	
Richmond–Petersburg	Virginia	WRIC-TV	2013	2017	
Roanoke–Lynchburg	Virginia	WSLS-TV	1997	2017	
Green Bay	Wisconsin	WBAY-TV	2013	2017	

== Other assets ==
- Atlee Park
- Blockdot
- Boxerjam Media
- BiteSizeTV
- Hollywood Today Live, a daily syndicated entertainment news program distributed by Media General stations, along with Fox Television Stations under a traditional syndication arrangement.
- LIN Digital
