= LIN Media =

American communications company, 1994–2014

LIN Media, LLC
- Type: Public
- Traded as: NYSE: LIN
- Industry: Broadcast television; Television production
- Predecessor: LIN Broadcasting; LIN TV Corporation; New Vision Television
- Founded: 1994; 32 years ago
- Defunct: December 19, 2014; 11 years ago
- Fate: Merged with Media General
- Successor: Media General; Nexstar Media Group
- Headquarters: Providence, Rhode Island; Austin, Texas
- Area served: United States (Nationwide)
- Key people: Vincent L. Sadusky (CEO)
- Products: Broadcast television
- Revenue: ▲$443.5 million USD
- Operating income: ▲$247.44 million USD
- Net income: ▼$274.5 million USD
- Owner: HM Capital Partners (70%)
- Number of employees: 2,414 (full-time)
- Subsidiaries: LIN Digital; Station Venture Holdings (20.38%)

The former LIN TV logo.

LIN Media was an American holding company founded in 1994 that operated 43 television stations. All except one were affiliates of the six major U.S. television networks. One of the remaining stations was a low-powered weather station in Indiana.

LIN Media's chief executive officer was Vincent L. Sadusky. Sadusky had been LIN's chief financial officer, Vice President and treasurer since 2004, and had been CFO for Telemundo, working closely on its sale to GE/NBC. Sadusky had been interim CEO since former chairman Gary R. Chapman announced his impending retirement in June 2006, and through the company's search for a permanent replacement. He was installed as CEO upon Chapman's retirement on July 10, 2006.

== History ==
LIN TV's roots trace back to the founding of its former parent, LIN Broadcasting Corporation, in 1961. LIN Broadcasting was engaged in radio, television, direct marketing, information and learning, music publishing, and record labels. LIN takes its initials from three major cities: Louisville, Indianapolis and Nashville. The company was based in Nashville, where it owned WMAK. It purchased WAKY in Louisville and attempted to purchase a station in Indianapolis but failed to do so. The company purchased its first television station, WTVP (now WAND) in Decatur, Illinois, at the end of 1965. It also briefly owned the catalogues of King Records and Starday Records in the early 1970s.

LIN Broadcasting made acquisitions in broadcasting, expanded into paging, and in the early 1980s the company entered the fledgling cellular telephone business. By 1983 the company owned seven television stations and by 1985 it owned and managed cellular telephone licenses serving Dallas, Houston, Los Angeles, New York City, and Philadelphia. LIN Broadcasting sold its paging operations and six of its radio stations in 1986 to help finance the development of its cellular business.

In March 1990, McCaw Cellular Communications purchased a 52% interest in LIN Broadcasting. McCaw was acquired by AT&T in 1994, after which LIN Broadcasting's television operations were spun off as a public company traded on the NASDAQ stock market and 45%-owned by AT&T. The new company, LIN Television Corporation, owned and/or operated 12 stations and its stock price increased at a compounded annual growth rate of 31% between 1994 and 1998. During this period LIN acquired WIVB-TV in Buffalo, New York, and WTNH in New Haven, Connecticut.

In March 1998, LIN TV was acquired by Hicks, Muse, Tate & Furst, a leading private investment firm based in Dallas, Texas. At the time of the HMTF acquisition, LIN contributed its Dallas NBC affiliate, KXAS-TV, to a joint venture with the network that also held the San Diego affiliate (KNSD). Under HMTFs ownership, LIN Television has grown considerably through a wide range of transactions:

In June 1999, LIN TV acquired WOOD-TV in Grand Rapids, Michigan. Former parent LIN Broadcasting had owned the station from 1983 to 1994, when it merged with AT&T. However, LIN TV had continued to operate it.

In August 1999, LIN TV helped finance the establishment of the now-defunct Banks Broadcasting, a minority-owned television broadcast company in which it held a 50% interest. Banks owned two stations: KWCV (now KSCW-DT) in Wichita, Kansas, and KNIN-TV in Boise, Idaho.

LIN TV purchased WAPA-TV in San Juan, Puerto Rico, in October. In April 2000, LIN TV acquired WLFI-TV in Lafayette, Indiana, in exchange for 66% of WAND. LIN continued to provide management oversight for WAND.

LIN TV purchased WWLP in Springfield, Massachusetts, in 2000. In 2001, LIN TV acquired WJPX and two satellite facilities in Puerto Rico, and the secondary commercial license of PBS member station WNEQ in Buffalo from the Western New York Public Broadcasting Association, re-launching it as commercial station WNLO.

The company exercised and closed on options to purchase WOTV in Battle Creek, Michigan, and WVBT in Norfolk, Virginia, both stations that it had already managed, in January 2002.

In February, LIN TV agreed to acquire seven stations in six markets from Sunrise Television. The transaction of the stations was completed in May. Also in May, LIN TV completed the issuance of 19.55 million shares of Class A Common Stock through its initial public offering on the New York Stock Exchange.

In December 2002, LIN TV announced the sale of two television stations in Abilene and San Angelo, Texas. This was followed in January 2004 by the sale of a station in Flint, Michigan.

In 2004, LIN TV announced that they signed a deal with NBC to switch its Dayton station WDTN, along with LIN-operated WAND, from ABC to NBC. In both markets, Sinclair Broadcast Group owned the previous NBC affiliates, which signed with ABC.

In February 2005, LIN TV announced purchase of two UPN stations from Viacom: WWHO in Columbus, Ohio, and WNDY-TV in Indianapolis. In late August 2005, LIN TV purchased several stations from Emmis Communications: WALA-TV and WBPG (now WFNA) in Mobile, Alabama, WTHI-TV in Terre Haute, Indiana, KRQE in Albuquerque, New Mexico, and WLUK-TV in Green Bay, Wisconsin. In July 2006, LIN announced the planned purchase of a second station in New Mexico, KASA-TV, from Raycom Media.

In May 2006, LIN TV announced the sale of Puerto Rico stations WAPA-TV and WJPX to InterMedia Partners for $130 million.

In November 2007, LIN TV completed the sale of its share of WAND to Block Communications. With this sale, LIN TV no longer manages the station.

On October 3, 2008, LIN TV's stations were dropped from Time Warner Cable, due to a dispute over "retransmission fees". LIN's stations returned to Time Warner on October 29, 2008.

Also during fall 2008, LIN TV and Fox Interactive Media developed a new Web CMS platform which would initially host the Web sites of all of the stations owned by LIN TV and those owned by Fox Television Stations. This division would be spun off in 2009 as the independent company Canvas Technology, which would change its name to EndPlay in 2010. With Fox Television Stations abandoning the EndPlay platform in favor of WorldNow during 2012, LIN TV became EndPlay's largest client, followed by the E. W. Scripps Company (which adopted the EndPlay platform during 2010).

On August 7, 2009, LIN TV introduced mobile TV BlackBerry service on six of its stations, with plans for 27 more stations to be added. The strategy accompanied a 20 percent second-quarter revenue decline; at the same time, digital revenue rose 52 percent.

On October 6, 2009, LIN TV acquired RM Media, an online advertising and media services startup based in Austin. RM Media connected targeted audiences with advertisers and publishers based on demographic, psychographic and consumer behaviors to enhance branding and maximize client return on investment. RM Media developed extensive proprietary technology including a consumer- and advertiser-friendly video player, a top 35 comScore display ad network, a highly effective Search Engine Optimization and Search Engine Marketing process, and acquired and integrated two companies that specialize in web development and lead generation, launched two top 100 comScore proprietary websites and services several Fortune 500 clients.

A rebranding to LIN Media was announced on April 13, 2010; although the corporate name remained LIN TV Corporation, the new name emphasized the company's Internet and mobile interests.

On June 4, 2010, LIN TV reached a deal with ACME Communications on a shared services agreement involving ACME and LIN-owned stations in the Green Bay, Dayton, and Albuquerque markets. LIN TV would then provide technical, engineering, promotional, administrative and other operational support services for ACME's CW stations, as well as provide advertising sales services under a related but separate joint sales agreement. This was followed on September 2 by the announcement that LIN would be acquiring two of the ACME stations, WBDT in Dayton, Ohio, and WIWB in Green Bay, Wisconsin. WIWB, which has since taken the new calls WCWF, would become owned by LIN outright while WBDT would be technically owned by Vaughan Media but controlled by LIN who would hold an ownership stake in that company. The FCC approved the sales of WBDT and WCWF in April 2011.

On March 4, 2011, LIN TV's contract with Dish Network expired, and all 31 LIN TV affiliated stations were pulled from local Dish Network broadcasts. LIN TV initially demanded a price increase of 140% from Dish Network, a number that skyrocketed to 175% after the contract expired. The channels returned to Dish Network on March 13, 2011. In 2011, LIN sold WWHO to Manhan Media, who entered into an SSA with Sinclair Broadcast Group, owners of WSYX and operators of WTTE; the deal was finalized in February 2012.

=== 2012: New Vision acquisition, NBC sale ===
On May 7, 2012, LIN TV announced that it would acquire the 13 television stations owned by New Vision Television for $330.4 million and the assumption of $12 million in debt. The agreement included operational control of three stations currently owned by PBC Broadcasting involved in shared service agreements with New Vision-owned stations in three markets. The three PBC-owned stations (KTKA-TV in Topeka, Kansas, WTGS in Savannah, Georgia, and WYTV in Youngstown, Ohio) were sold to Vaughan Media, but were operated by LIN TV under shared service agreements. The transaction was finalized on October 12.

On February 13, 2013, LIN TV announced that it would be re-organized into a new company, LIN Media, LLC. Also on that date, LIN pulled out of its Station Venture Operations joint venture with NBCUniversal, giving NBC 100% ownership of KNSD and KXAS-TV. LIN paid NBC around $100 million to allow for the transaction. The re-organization was completed on July 30.

=== 2014: Media General merger ===
On March 21, 2014, LIN announced that it would sell itself to Media General, in a transaction described as a "merger". The deal, worth an estimated $1.6 billion, would create an entity of 71 stations (adjusted for side deals and divestitures) that would reach approximately 24% of U.S. television households. In order to comply with FCC ownership rules as well as planned changes to rules regarding same-market television stations which would prohibit future joint sales agreements, Media General and LIN divested and swapped stations that both companies own in Birmingham, Green Bay, Mobile, Providence and Savannah. The companies swapped WTGS, WJAR, WLUK-TV and WCWF to Sinclair Broadcast Group in exchange for KXRM-TV, KXTU-LD, and WTTA. Hearst Television acquired WJCL and WVTM-TV, and Meredith Corporation acquired WALA-TV (Meredith was later acquired by Gray Television).

The deal was approved by shareholders on October 6, 2014, and by the FCC on December 12, 2014. The merger was completed on December 19. Although the combined company adopted the Media General name, the company was taken over by the principal staff of LIN, including CEO Vincent Sadusky, who replaced Media General's CEO George Mahoney post-merger. In total, 45 Media General staff members were laid off as part of the merger.

On January 11, 2017, the FCC approved the sale of Media General to Nexstar Broadcasting Group; the sale was completed on January 17.

== Former stations ==
- Stations are arranged in alphabetical order by state and city of license.
- Two boldface asterisks appearing following a station's call letters (**) indicate a station built and signed on by LIN Media.

Stations owned by LIN Media
Media market	State/Territory	Station	Purchased	Sold	Notes
Birmingham	Alabama	WIAT	2012	2014	
Mobile	Alabama	WALA-TV	2005	2014	
Mobile	Alabama	WFNA	2006	2014	(Note: Known as WBPG prior to 2009.)
San Diego	California	KNSD	1997	1998	(Note: Through Station Venture Operations, LIN kept 24 percent ownership of these stations from 1998 to 2013.)
Durango	Colorado	KREZ-TV	2005	2014	(Note: Satellite of KRQE.)
New Haven–Hartford	Connecticut	WTNH	1994	2014	
New Haven–Hartford	Connecticut	WCTX	1995	2014	(Note: Known as WTVU from 1995 to 1996, and as WBNE from 1996 to 2000.)
Savannah	Georgia	WJCL	2012	2014	
Savannah	Georgia	WTGS	2012	2014	(Note: Owned by a third party and operated by LIN.)
Honolulu	Hawaii	KHON-TV	2012	2014	
Hilo	Hawaii	KHAW-TV	2012	2014	(Note: Satellite of KHON-TV.)
Wailuku	Hawaii	KAII-TV	2012	2014	
Decatur–Springfield–Champaign	Illinois	WAND	1965	2000	(Note: Known as WTVP prior to 1966.)
Fort Wayne	Indiana	WANE-TV	1984	2014	
Indianapolis	Indiana	WISH-TV	1984	2014	
Indianapolis	Indiana	WNDY-TV	2005	2014	
Indianapolis	Indiana	WIIH-CD	1992	2014	(Note: Translator of WISH-TV.)
Terre Haute	Indiana	WTHI-TV	2005	2014	
West Lafayette	Indiana	WLFI-TV	2000	2014	
Mason City	Iowa	KIMT	2012	2014	
Colby	Kansas	KLBY	1999	2000	(Note: Satellite of KAKE.)
Dodge City	Kansas	KUPK-TV	1999	2000	
Garden City	Kansas	KSNG	2012	2014	(Note: Satellite of KSNW.)
Great Bend	Kansas	KSNC	2012	2014	
Salina	Kansas	KSNL-LD	2012	2014	
Topeka	Kansas	KSNT	2012	2014	
Topeka	Kansas	KTMJ-CD	2012	2014	
Topeka	Kansas	KTKA-TV	2012	2014	
Wichita	Kansas	KAKE-TV	1999	2000	
Wichita	Kansas	KSNW	2012	2014	
Springfield	Massachusetts	WWLP	2000	2014	
Springfield	Massachusetts	WFXQ-CD	2006	2014	(Note: Translator of WWLP.)
Battle Creek	Michigan	WOTV	2001	2014	
Bay City–Flint–Saginaw	Michigan	WEYI-TV	2002	2004	
Grand Rapids	Michigan	WOOD-TV	1983	1994	(Note: Known as WOTV prior to 1992.)
Grand Rapids	Michigan	WOOD-TV	1999	2014	
Grand Rapids	Michigan	WXSP-CD	2002	2014	
McCook	Nebraska	KSNK	2012	2014	
Omaha	Nebraska	WOWT	1999	2000	
Albuquerque–Santa Fe	New Mexico	KRQE	2005	2014	
Albuquerque–Santa Fe	New Mexico	KASA-TV	2007	2014	
Albuquerque–Santa Fe	New Mexico	KWBQ	2010	2014	
Albuquerque–Santa Fe	New Mexico	KASY-TV	2010	2014	
Roswell	New Mexico	KBIM-TV	2005	2014	
Roswell	New Mexico	KRWB-TV	2010	2014	(Note: Satellite of KWBQ.)
Buffalo	New York	WIVB-TV	1995	2014	
Buffalo	New York	WNLO	2001	2014	
Columbus	Ohio	WWHO	2005	2012	
Dayton–Springfield	Ohio	WDTN	2002	2014	
Dayton–Springfield	Ohio	WBDT	2010	2014	
Toledo	Ohio	WUPW	2002	2012	
Youngstown	Ohio	WYFX-LD	2012	2014	
Youngstown	Ohio	WKBN-TV	2012	2014	
Youngstown	Ohio	WYTV	2012	2014	
Portland	Oregon	KOIN	2012	2014	
Providence	Rhode Island	WPRI-TV	2002	2014	
Providence	Rhode Island	WNAC-TV	2001	2014	
Abilene	Texas	KRBC-TV	2002	2003	
Austin	Texas	KXAN-TV	1979	2014	(Note: Known as KTVV prior to 1987.)
Austin	Texas	KNVA	1994	2014	
Austin	Texas	KBVO-CD	2001	2014	(Note: Translator of KBVO.)
Llano	Texas	KBVO **	1991	2014	(Note: Known as KLNO in 1991 and KXAM from 1991 to 2009.)
Fort Worth–Dallas	Texas	KXAS-TV	1974	1998	
San Angelo	Texas	KACB-TV	2002	2003	
Portsmouth–Norfolk–Newport News	Virginia	WAVY-TV	1968	2014	
Portsmouth–Norfolk–Newport News	Virginia	WVBT	1995	2014	
Green Bay	Wisconsin	WLUK-TV	2005	2014	
Green Bay	Wisconsin	WCWF	2010	2014	
San Juan	Puerto Rico	WAPA-TV	1998	2007	
San Juan	Puerto Rico	WJPX	2001	2007	
