= Vincent L. Sadusky =

American chief executive

- Born: 1966 (age 58–59); United States
- Education: Pennsylvania State University and New York Institute Of Technology
- Occupation: Business executive

Vincent (Vince) L. Sadusky is an American business executive who is the chief executive officer at International Game Technology (IGT). He previously was CEO and president of Media General ahead of its sale to Nexstar Media Group. Previously, he was the president, chief executive officer and CFO of LIN Media. He also was the director of International Game Technology. He holds a BS degree from Pennsylvania State University and an MBA from New York Institute Of Technology.
