= Station Venture Holdings =

Station Venture Holdings, LLC
- Type: Joint venture
- Industry: Broadcast television
- Founded: 1997; 29 years ago
- Defunct: February 2013; 13 years ago
- Headquarters: San Diego, California
- Owners: NBC (79.62%); LIN Television Corporation (20.38%)
- Divisions: Station Venture Operations, LP; KNSD; KXAS-TV; WYCN-LD (post-joint venture)

Station Venture Holdings, LLC was a joint venture between NBC and LIN Television Corporation that operated two NBC-affiliated television stations, KNSD and KXAS-TV. These stations under the joint venture were still considered owned-and-operated stations, as NBC held a majority stake in the venture. WBTS-LD (now Telemundo station WYCN-LD) was added to this venture in November 2016 as the licensee for that station.

== History ==
The venture began in 1997 when LIN sold a controlling interest in KXAS to NBC, and NBC contributed KNSD to the resulting partnership. Owing to their controlling stake in the partnership, NBC took operational control of both stations. In February 2013, LIN pulled out of the joint venture with NBCUniversal as part of a corporate reorganization, giving NBC full ownership of KXAS and KNSD. LIN paid NBC around $100 million to allow for the transaction. The stations remain under this name for FCC licensing purposes, along with WYCN-LD.
