= Gregg Jarrett =

American journalist

- Jarrett in 2019
- Born: Gregory Walter Jarrett; April 7, 1955 (age 71); Los Angeles, California, U.S.
- Education: Claremont McKenna College (BA); University of California, Hastings College of the Law (JD)
- Occupations: Fox News political commentator, defense attorney
- Spouse: Catherine Kennedy Anderson (m. 1993)

Gregory Walter Jarrett (born April 7, 1955) is an American conservative news commentator, author and attorney. He joined Fox News in November 2002, after working at local NBC and ABC TV stations for over ten years, as well as national networks Court TV and MSNBC.

Jarrett is known for his pro-Trump commentary, and for his criticism of the probe into Russian interference in the 2016 U.S. elections. In 2018, he published The Russia Hoax, which argues that the "deep state" have sought to undermine the Trump administration and protect 2016 presidential candidate Hillary Clinton. He has described Special Counsel Robert Mueller's Russia probe as "illegitimate and corrupt" and likened the FBI to the KGB.

== Biography ==
Jarrett was born in Los Angeles and raised in nearby San Marino, California, graduating from San Marino High School in 1973. He graduated magna cum laude from Claremont McKenna College in 1977 with a degree in political science. He graduated with a Juris Doctor degree from the University of California, Hastings College of the Law in 1980, and worked as a defense attorney for several years in San Francisco with the firm of Gordon & Rees. As of February 3, 2015, his California State Bar license is listed as "inactive." Jarrett has taught law as an adjunct professor at New York Law School and lectured at other law schools.

Jarrett joined Fox News in November 2002. Prior to joining Fox, Jarrett worked at MSNBC. Jarrett also worked at Court TV, now known as TruTV, for eight years, serving as the anchor of Prime Time Justice. He hosted the network's nationally syndicated half-hour magazine show, Inside America's Courts, which was seen daily on broadcast stations (NBC in New York City and Los Angeles) and weekends on CNBC.

Prior to Court TV, Jarrett worked for a number of local stations. including KCSM-TV in San Francisco, California; WMDT-TV in Salisbury, Maryland; WKFT-TV in Fayetteville, North Carolina and KSNW-TV in Wichita, Kansas. While at KSNW, he received a Heartland Emmy Award for the "Turnpike Tornado" news segment.

Jarrett's legal commentary has generally defended President Donald Trump. In August 2017, Jarrett called for a grand jury for Hillary Clinton over her email controversy. A day later, when a grand jury was impaneled by special counsel Robert Mueller in the investigation into Russian interference in the 2016 United States elections, Jarrett said that grand juries were an "undemocratic farce". Jarrett later called the Mueller investigation "illegitimate and corrupt" on Fox News, stating that "the FBI has become America's secret police" and "a shadow government". Jarrett likened the FBI to the KGB, the Soviet security agency, for which he received PolitiFact's "Pants on Fire" rating. According to PolitiFact, "numerous historians of the FBI and the KGB say the comparison is ridiculous. The KGB implemented the goals of the Communist Party leadership, including countless examples of tortures and summary executions. The FBI, by contrast, is subject to the rule of law and is democratically accountable".

In Chapter 5 of his 2018 book, The Russia Hoax, Jarrett did identify and discuss several collusion-related crimes. So did Special Counsel Robert Mueller in his 2019 Final Report on "Trump, Russia, and Collusion." Mueller also stated, "But Collusion is not a specific offense or theory of liability found in the United States Code, nor is it a term of art in federal criminal law."

Jarrett has said that former FBI Director James Comey may have broken the law by releasing a memo to press wherein Comey recounted a conversation with President Trump where Trump requested that Comey end the investigation into Michael Flynn. University of Texas School of Law professor Bobby Chesney said Jarrett's assertion was "nonsense". University of Georgia School of Law professor Diane Marie Amann also refuted Jarrett's assertion.

In February 2018, Jarrett asserted that he had a "highly reliable congressional source" which told him that Deputy Attorney General Rod Rosenstein "used the power of his office to threaten members of Congress"; HuffPost described the assertion as "dubious".

=== The Russia Hoax ===
In 2018, Jarrett published the book The Russia Hoax which alleges that "Hillary Clinton’s deep state collaborators in government" engaged in "nefarious actions" to protect Clinton and undermine Trump. The book was an Amazon and New York Times best-seller. President Trump praised the book. According to Rolling Stone magazine, the book "amounts to 286 pages of recapping every single bad thing the Clintons have ever been accused of doing (Uranium One is, again, mentioned dozens of times.)... The idea that the Clinton email investigation could be dropped, and the Russia investigation taken up just a few months later isn’t seen as coincidence, but conspiracy, a bit of revenge enacted by an intelligence community full of Clinton fans." In a review for The Washington Post, Carlos Lozada described the book as a Trump hagiography. In 2018, PolitiFact highlighted five claims made in Jarrett's book as false, misleading and unsubstantiated.

== Personal life ==
Jarrett married Catherine Kennedy Anderson September 11, 1993 at Calvary Episcopal Church in New York. They have two children.

Jarrett was arrested in May 2014 by Minneapolis–Saint Paul International Airport police, who were called to an airport bar after reports that Jarrett seemed intoxicated and acted belligerently. Jarrett was booked into Hennepin County Jail and charged with misdemeanor interfering with a police officer as being “belligerent and uncooperative” and released on a $300 bond. The charge against Jarrett was dismissed in February 2016. CNN reported that Jarrett's arrest occurred right after Jarrett had checked out of a rehabilitation facility and was dealing with “personal issues”.

== Bibliography ==
- Jarrett, Gregg (2023). The Constitution of the United States and Other Patriotic Documents. Broadside Books (division of HarperCollins). ISBN 978-0063275386.
- Jarrett, Gregg; Yaeger, Don (2023). The Trial of the Century. Threshold Editions. ISBN 978-1982198572.
- Jarrett, Gregg (2019). Witch Hunt: The Plot to Destroy Trump and Undo His Election. Broadside Books. ISBN 978-0062960092.
- Jarrett, Gregg (2018). The Russia Hoax: The Illicit Scheme to Clear Hillary Clinton and Frame Donald Trump. Broadside Books. ISBN 978-0062872746.
