= Industrial revenue bond =

An industrial revenue bond (IRB), also formerly known as an Industrial Development Bond (IDB), is a unique type of revenue bond organized by a state or local government. The bond issue is sponsored by a government entity but the proceeds are directed to a private, for-profit business.

== Bond Structure ==
An IRB differs from traditional government revenue bonds, as the bonds are issued on behalf of a private sector business. IRBs are typically used to support a specific project, such as a new manufacturing facility.

The bond issue is created and organized by a sponsoring government, with the proceeds used by the private business. The business is responsible for bond repayment. The sponsoring government holds title to the underlying collateral until the bonds are paid in full. In some cases, this arrangement may provide a federal tax exempt status to the bonds, and many times a property tax exemption on the collateral. The sponsoring government is not responsible for bond repayment and the bonds do not affect the government’s credit rating. IRBs are desired as the private business receives a lower interest rate (due to the bonds tax-exempt status), a property tax exemption, and a long-term, fixed rate financing package.

Bond proceeds may be used for a variety of purposes, including land acquisition, building construction, machinery and equipment, real estate development fees, and the cost of bond issuance.

== IRS Statute ==
In the United States IRBs are governed by IRS statute and include the following provisions:

- The maximum amount of bonds that may be issued or outstanding is US$10 million.
- Total capital expenditures at the project site may not exceed US$20 million total
- Total IRBs outstanding at the company in the U.S. may not exceed US$40 million total

== See also ==
- Revenue bond
- Municipal bond
