= News & Messenger =

Daily newspaper published in Manassas, Virginia

The News & Messenger was a daily newspaper that was published in Manassas, Virginia and was one of a number of competing local papers covering the Washington, D.C. suburbs and exurbs in the region. The paper was owned by Berkshire Hathaway's World Media Enterprises division, which also published the weekly Stafford County Sun.

In August 2010, The Potomac News and Manassas Journal Messenger combined into one daily paper called the News & Messenger. The Woodbridge office was closed and all the printing and page layout was done in other cities. The publication was based in the Manassas office.

The Potomac News rose to national prominence twice in the 1990s, first with its coverage of the John and Lorena Bobbitt scandal (both were Manassas residents) and then later for its coverage of the Beltway sniper attacks.

In June 2012, Berkshire Hathaway purchased most of Media General's newspapers, including the News & Messenger, folding them into the World Media Enterprises division.

The paper printed its final edition on Sunday, December 30, 2012; Berkshire Hathaway cited that the paper was losing money, and was unable to compete with other media properties in the region. The paper's website, insidenova.com, was acquired by another media group, Northern Virginia Media Services, publisher of Prince William Today, one of two weekly papers (the Prince William Times is the other) that launched in January 2013 following the closure of the News & Messenger. Prince William Today is now called InsideNoVa/Prince William and is distributed to 26,000 households a week.
