= LIN Digital =

American media company

- Type: Subsidiary
- Industry: Online advertising
- Founded: 2002; 24 years ago
- Founder: Aaron M Welch
- Headquarters: Austin, Texas, US
- Key people: Jon Flatt (CEO); Sherri Holland (CFO); Scott Friesen (COO)
- Parent: Nexstar Media Group
- Website: www.lindigital.com

LIN Digital is an online advertising and media services company based in Austin, Texas, United States.

In 2008 it was ranked No. 1,055 in the Top 5000 Fastest Growing Private Companies in the U.S. by Inc Magazine.

LIN Digital's premium display ad network is among Comscore's Top 30 Ad Networks according to Comscore rankings. It aggregates traffic from thousands of top-tier online publishers reaching up to 100 million unique visitors per month.

== History ==
The company was started by Jon Flatt and Aaron M. Welch in 2002 as an SEM company. As the company grew, it attracted the attention of Red McCombs Enterprises. In 2005 Flatt and Welch partnered with Red McCombs, and at that time the company name became Red McCombs Media. In 2007 Red McCombs Media acquired MediaEngine, co-founded by Michael Magruder and Scott Friesen, to complement their technical capabilities. Since then the company has increased their service offerings to include display advertising, SEO, SEM, SMS mobile marketing, and limited web application services.

The company continues to grow, and in 2008 has been recognized as one of Inc. Magazine's 5000 Fastest Growing Private Companies in America and Austin's 50 fastest growing companies by the Austin Business Journal.

Red McCombs Media Corporate Logo

On October 2, 2009, LIN TV acquired Red McCombs Media. As part of this transaction, Red McCombs Media assumed the legal name Primeland Television dba RM Media, though plans to continue to operate under the Red McCombs Media brand name. In January 2013, the name was changed to LIN Digital. In 2014, LIN Digital was acquired by Media General, which would later be acquired by Nexstar Broadcasting Group in 2017.
