= KSNC =

Television station in Great Bend, Kansas

Semi-satellite of KSNW, Wichita, Kansas

- Great Bend–Hays, Kansas; United States
- City: Great Bend, Kansas
- Channels: Digital: 22 (UHF); Virtual: 2
- Branding: see KSNW infobox

Programming
- Network: Kansas State Network
- Affiliations: 2.1: NBC; 2.2: Telemundo; for others, see § Subchannels

Ownership
- Owner: Nexstar Media Group; (Nexstar Media Inc.)
- Sister stations: KSNW; KSNK; KSNG; KSNL-LD

History
- First air date: November 28, 1954
- Former call signs: KCKT (1954–1982)
- Former channel numbers: Analog: 2 (VHF, 1954–2008)
- Call sign meaning: Kansas State Network Central Kansas

Technical information
- Licensing authority: FCC
- Facility ID: 72359
- ERP: 500 kW
- HAAT: 284 m (932 ft)
- Transmitter coordinates: 38°25′54″N 98°46′18″W

Links
- Public license information: Public file; LMS
- Website: www.ksn.com

KSNC (channel 2) is a television station licensed to Great Bend, Kansas, United States, affiliated with NBC and Telemundo. Owned by Nexstar Media Group, the station maintains a news bureau, advertising sales office and transmitter along US 281, three miles (5 km) north of Great Bend.

KSNC is part of the Kansas State Network (KSN), a regional network of five stations relaying programming from Wichita NBC affiliate KSNW (channel 3) across central and western Kansas, as well as bordering counties in Nebraska and Oklahoma; KSNC incorporates local advertising and news inserts aimed at areas of central Kansas within the Wichita–Hutchinson Plus television market. Master control and most internal operations are based at KSNW's studios on North Main Street in northwest Wichita (near downtown).

== History ==
The station first signed on the air on November 28, 1954, as KCKT; it was founded by Central Kansas Television Co., Inc. On November 5, 1958, KCKT signed on a satellite station in Garden City, KGLD (channel 11, now KSNG). The two stations were collectively branded as the "Tri-Circle Network". KCKT and KGLD were joined on November 28, 1959, by KOMC-TV (channel 8) in Oberlin.

In 1962, after the Federal Communications Commission (FCC) ruled that central and western Kansas was part of the Wichita market, Central Kansas Television purchased KARD (channel 3, now KSNW) in that city and merged it with KCKT, KGLD and KOMC-TV (channel 8). The three stations relayed NBC programming throughout central and western Kansas. The Tri-Circle Network changed its name to the "Kansas State Network" a few years later, with KARD serving as the flagship of the new four-station regional network. During the 1960s and 1970s, KCKT relayed its programming on K74CN (channel 74), later changed to K18AA (channel 18) in Salina.

The station changed its call letters to KSNC on August 16, 1982, as part of an effort to help viewers think of the four stations as part of one large network. In 1988, the KSN stations were acquired by SJL Broadcast Management. The stations were then sold to Lee Enterprises in 1995. Emmis Communications bought most of Lee Enterprises' television properties in 2000. Montecito Broadcast Group, a newly formed partnership between SJL and the private equity firm Blackstone Group, acquired the KSN stations from Emmis on January 27, 2006.

On July 24, 2007, Montecito announced the sale of its four stations (KSNW, KHON-TV in Honolulu, KOIN in Portland, Oregon, and KSNT in Topeka, as well as satellites of KSNW and KHON) to New Vision Television; the sale was finalized on November 1, 2007. On May 7, 2012, the LIN TV Corporation announced that it would acquire the New Vision Television station group, including KSNW and its four satellite stations, for $330.4 million and the assumption of $12 million in debt; the sale—which was approved by the FCC on October 2, and was completed 1 1/2 weeks later on October 12—marked a re-entry into Kansas for LIN, which briefly owned the licenses of K30GD (channel 30, now KGBD-LD) and its translators K25CV (channel 25) and K20BU (channel 20, now K38GH-D on channel 38), low-power repeaters of Wichita ABC affiliate KAKE-TV (channel 10), in 2000, before selling them to Benedek Broadcasting shortly after the purchase was finalized.

On March 21, 2014, Media General announced that it would purchase LIN Media and its stations, including KSNW, in a $1.6 billion merger—giving the station its sixth owner since 2000. Like the earlier acquisition of KSNW by LIN, this deal marked Media General's re-entry to the market, as it previously owned KBSH-TV (channel 7), a satellite of CBS affiliate KWCH-TV (channel 12), from 2000 to 2006. The merger was completed on December 19. On September 28, 2015, Nexstar Broadcasting Group announced it had offered to purchase Media General and its stations, including KSNW and its satellites. On January 27, 2016, Nexstar announced that it had reached an agreement to acquire Media General. The acquisition of KSNC and its other satellites by Nexstar reunited the stations with former satellite KSNF, whose ownership was split from the rest of the Kansas State Network in 1986. The deal was approved by the FCC on January 11, 2017, and it was completed on January 17, marking Nexstar's first entry into the Wichita market.

== Newscasts ==
Channel 2 aired its own newscasts for many years. However, its local operations were progressively cut back from the mid-1980s onward. By the start of the 21st century, local news content had been reduced to inserts in KSNW's newscasts, and localized station identifications had been largely eliminated.

== Technical information ==
=== Subchannels ===
The station's signal is multiplexed:

Subchannels of KSNC
Subchannel	Res.	Short name	Programming
2.1	1080i	KSNC-DT	NBC
2.2	1080i	T'mundo	Telemundo
2.3	480i	ION	Ion
2.4	480i	BUSTED	Busted

=== Analog-to-digital conversion ===
KSNC shut down its analog signal, over VHF channel 2, on October 1, 2008. The station's digital signal remained on its pre-transition UHF channel 22, using virtual channel 2.
