= KSNG =

Television station in Garden City, Kansas

Semi-satellite of KSNW, Wichita, Kansas

- Garden City–Dodge City, Kansas; United States
- City: Garden City, Kansas
- Channels: Digital: 11 (VHF); Virtual: 11
- Branding: see KSNW infobox

Programming
- Network: Kansas State Network
- Affiliations: 11.1: NBC; 11.2: Telemundo; for others, see § Subchannels

Ownership
- Owner: Nexstar Media Group; (Nexstar Media Inc.)
- Sister stations: KSNW; KSNC; KSNK; KSNL-LD

History
- First air date: November 5, 1958
- Former call signs: KGLD (1958–1982)
- Former channel numbers: Analog: 11 (VHF, 1958–2009); Digital: 16 (UHF, until 2009)
- Call sign meaning: Kansas State Network Garden City

Technical information
- Licensing authority: FCC
- Facility ID: 72361
- ERP: 7.4 kW
- HAAT: 239 m (784 ft)
- Transmitter coordinates: 37°46′40″N 100°52′8″W

Links
- Public license information: Public file; LMS
- Website: www.ksn.com

KSNG (channel 11) is a television station licensed to Garden City, Kansas, United States, affiliated with NBC and Telemundo. The station is owned by Nexstar Media Group, and maintains a news bureau and advertising sales office on Fulton Street in southwestern Garden City; its transmitter is located east of US 83 in rural southwestern Finney County (south of Plymell).

KSNG is part of the Kansas State Network (KSN), a regional network of five stations relaying programming from Wichita NBC affiliate KSNW (channel 3) across central and western Kansas, as well as bordering counties in Nebraska and Oklahoma; KSNG incorporates local advertising and news inserts aimed at areas of southwest Kansas within the Wichita–Hutchinson Plus television market. Master control and most internal operations are based at KSNW's studios on North Main Street in northwest Wichita (near downtown).

== History ==
The station first signed on the air on November 5, 1958, as KGLD (standing for Garden City, Liberal and Dodge City). Originally operating as a satellite of KCKT (channel 2, now KSNC) in Great Bend, it was founded by Central Kansas Television Co., Inc. The two stations were collectively branded as the "Tri-Circle Network". KCKT and KGLD were joined on November 28, 1959, by KOMC-TV (channel 8, now KSNK) in Oberlin.

In 1962, after the Federal Communications Commission (FCC) ruled that central and western Kansas was part of the Wichita market, Central Kansas Television purchased KARD (channel 3, now KSNW) and merged it with KCKT, KGLD, and KOMC-TV. The three stations, which were collectively branded as the "Tri-Circle Network", relayed NBC programming throughout central and western Kansas. The Tri-Circle Network changed its name to the "Kansas State Network" a few years later, with KARD serving as the flagship of the new four-station regional network.

The station's call letters were changed to KSNG on August 30, 1982, as part of an effort to help viewers think of the four stations as part of one large network. In 1988, the KSN stations were acquired by SJL Broadcast Management. The stations were then sold to Lee Enterprises in 1995. Emmis Communications bought most of Lee Enterprises' television properties in 2000. Montecito Broadcast Group, a newly formed partnership between SJL and the private equity firm Blackstone Group, acquired the KSN stations from Emmis on January 27, 2006.

On July 24, 2007, Montecito announced the sale of its four stations (KSNW, KHON-TV in Honolulu, KOIN in Portland, Oregon, and KSNT in Topeka, as well as satellites of KSNW and KHON) to New Vision Television; the sale was finalized on November 1, 2007. On May 7, 2012, the LIN TV Corporation announced that it would acquire the New Vision Television station group, including KSNW and its four satellite stations, for $330.4 million and the assumption of $12 million in debt; the sale—which was approved by the FCC on October 2, and was completed 1 1/2 weeks later on October 12—marked a re-entry into Kansas for LIN, which briefly owned the license of KUPK (channel 13), a satellite of Wichita ABC affiliate KAKE-TV (channel 10), in 2000, before selling it to Benedek Broadcasting shortly after the purchase was finalized.

On March 21, 2014, Media General announced that it would purchase LIN Media and its stations, including KSNW, in a $1.6 billion merger—giving the station its sixth owner since 2000. Like the earlier acquisition of KSNW by LIN, this deal marked Media General's re-entry to the market, as it previously owned KBSD-TV (channel 6), a satellite of KWCH-TV (channel 12), from 2000 to 2006. The merger was completed on December 19. On September 28, 2015, Nexstar Broadcasting Group announced it had offered to purchase Media General and its stations, including KSNW and its satellites. On January 27, 2016, Nexstar announced that it had reached an agreement to acquire Media General. The acquisition of KSNG and its other satellites by Nexstar reunited the stations with former satellite KSNF, whose ownership was split from the rest of the Kansas State Network in 1986. The deal was approved by the FCC on January 11, 2017, and it was completed on January 17, marking Nexstar's first entry into the Wichita market.

== Technical information ==
=== Subchannels ===
The station's signal is multiplexed:

Subchannels of KSNG
Subchannel	Res.	Short name	Programming
11.1	1080i	KSNG-DT	NBC
11.2	1080i	T'mundo	Telemundo
11.3	480i	ION	Ion
11.4	480i	BUSTED	Busted

=== Analog-to-digital conversion ===
KSNG shut down its analog signal, over VHF channel 11, on June 12, 2009, the official date on which full-power television stations in the United States transitioned from analog to digital broadcasts under federal mandate. The station's digital signal relocated from its pre-transition UHF channel 16 to VHF channel 11 for post-transition operations. Two weeks later on June 27, 2009, KSNG increased its effective radiated power from 7.4 kW to 56.8 kW.
