= KSNK =

Television station in McCook, Nebraska

Semi-satellite of KSNW, Wichita, Kansas

- McCook, Nebraska; Oberlin, Kansas; United States
- City: McCook, Nebraska
- Channels: Digital: 12 (VHF); Virtual: 8
- Branding: see KSNW infobox

Programming
- Network: Kansas State Network
- Affiliations: 8.1: NBC; 8.2: Telemundo; for others, see § Subchannels

Ownership
- Owner: Nexstar Media Group; (Nexstar Media Inc.)
- Sister stations: KSNW; KSNC; KSNG; KSNL-LD

History
- First air date: October 18, 1959
- Former call signs: KOMC (1959–1982)
- Former channel numbers: Analog: 8 (VHF, 1959–2008)
- Call sign meaning: Kansas State Network

Technical information
- Licensing authority: FCC
- Facility ID: 72362
- ERP: 10.4 kW
- HAAT: 218 m (715 ft)
- Transmitter coordinates: 39°49′46.5″N 100°42′4.6″W

Links
- Public license information: Public file; LMS
- Website: www.ksn.com

KSNK (channel 8) is a television station licensed to McCook, Nebraska, United States, affiliated with NBC and Telemundo. Owned by Nexstar Media Group, the station maintains an advertising sales office on US 36 in northwestern Oberlin, Kansas, and its transmitter is located along US 36 in rural northwestern Decatur County.

KSNK is part of the Kansas State Network (KSN), a regional network of five stations relaying programming from Wichita NBC affiliate KSNW (channel 3) across central and western Kansas, as well as bordering counties in Nebraska and Oklahoma; KSNK incorporates local advertising and news inserts aimed at areas of northwest Kansas and bordering counties in southwestern Nebraska within the Wichita–Hutchinson Plus television market. It is the only KSNW satellite to be licensed outside Kansas and also outside the Wichita market, although it covers the general Oberlin–Colby–Goodland area as well.

Although the station's city of license is in Red Willow County, Nebraska, which is in the Lincoln–Hastings–Kearney market, its studio and transmitter are in Decatur County, Kansas, in the Wichita–Hutchinson market.

== History ==
The station first signed on the air on October 18, 1959, as KOMC-TV (for Oberlin-McCook), a satellite of Great Bend's KCKT-TV, under the ownership of Central Kansas Television. KCKT, KOMC and KGLD-TV in Garden City formed the "Tri-Circle Network", the NBC affiliate for central and western Kansas. In 1962, after the Federal Communications Commission (FCC) collapsed central and western Kansas into the Wichita market, Central Kansas Television purchased Wichita's KARD-TV and merged it with KOMC, KCKT and KGLD. The Tri-Circle Network changed its name to the "Kansas State Network" a few years later, with KARD serving as the flagship of the new four-station regional network.

The station changed its call letters to KSNK on September 6, 1982, as part of an effort to help viewers think of the four stations as part of one large network. Around this time, the station's city of license was relocated across the Kansas–Nebraska border from Oberlin to McCook, though the studios remained in Oberlin. In 1988, the KSN stations were acquired by SJL Broadcast Management. The stations were then sold to Lee Enterprises in 1995. Emmis Communications bought most of Lee Enterprises' television properties in 2000. Montecito Broadcast Group, a newly formed partnership between SJL and the private equity firm Blackstone Group, acquired the KSN stations from Emmis on January 27, 2006.

On July 24, 2007, Montecito announced the sale of its four stations (KSNW, KHON-TV in Honolulu, KOIN in Portland, Oregon, and KSNT in Topeka, as well as satellites of KSNW and KHON) to New Vision Television; the sale was finalized on November 1, 2007. On May 7, 2012, the LIN TV Corporation announced that it would acquire the New Vision Television station group, including KSNW and its four satellite stations, for $330.4 million and the assumption of $12 million in debt; the sale—which was approved by the FCC on October 2 and was completed 1 1/2 weeks later on October 12—marked a re-entry into Kansas for LIN, which briefly owned the license of KLBY (channel 4), a satellite of Wichita ABC affiliate KAKE-TV (channel 10), in 2000, before selling them to Benedek Broadcasting shortly after the purchase was finalized.

On March 21, 2014, Media General announced that it would purchase LIN Media and its stations, including KSNW, in a $1.6 billion merger—giving the station its sixth owner since 2000. Like the earlier acquisition of KSNW by LIN, this deal marked Media General's re-entry to the market, as it previously owned KBSL-TV (channel 10), a satellite of KWCH-TV (channel 12), from 2000 to 2006. The merger was completed on December 19. On September 28, 2015, Nexstar Broadcasting Group announced it had offered to purchase Media General and its stations, including KSNW and its satellites. On January 27, 2016, Nexstar announced that it had reached an agreement to acquire Media General. The acquisition of KSNK and its other satellites by Nexstar reunited the stations with former satellite KSNF, whose ownership was split from the rest of the Kansas State Network in 1986. The deal was approved by the FCC on January 11, 2017, and it was completed on January 17, marking Nexstar's first entry into the Wichita market.

== Newscasts ==
Although KSNK originated its own newscasts for many years, the station's local operations were progressively cut back from the mid-1980s onward. By the start of the 21st century, local news had been reduced to inserts in KSNW's newscasts, and separate identifications had been largely eliminated.

== Technical information ==
=== Subchannels ===
The station's signal is multiplexed:

Subchannels of KSNK
Subchannel	Res.	Short name	Programming
8.1	1080i	KSNK-DT	NBC
8.2	1080i	T'mundo	Telemundo
8.3	480i	ION	Ion
8.4	480i	BUSTED	Busted

=== Analog-to-digital conversion ===
KSNK shut down its analog signal, over VHF channel 8, on November 26, 2008. The station's digital signal remained on its pre-transition VHF channel 12, using virtual channel 8.
