= KSNT =

Television station in Topeka, Kansas

- Topeka, Kansas; United States
- Channels: Digital: 27 (UHF); Virtual: 27
- Branding: 27 KSNT; 27 News

Programming
- Affiliations: 27.1: NBC; 27.2: Fox; for others, see § Subchannels

Ownership
- Owner: Nexstar Media Group; (Nexstar Media Inc.)
- Sister stations: KTKA-TV, KTMJ-CD

History
- First air date: December 28, 1967
- Former call signs: KTSB (1967–1982)
- Former channel numbers: Analog: 27 (UHF, 1967–2009); Digital: 28 (UHF, 2004–2009)
- Former affiliations: ABC (secondary, 1967–1983)
- Call sign meaning: Kansas State Network Topeka (former KSNW semi-satellite)

Technical information
- Licensing authority: FCC
- Facility ID: 67335
- ERP: 77.9 kW
- HAAT: 320 m (1,050 ft)
- Transmitter coordinates: 39°5′34″N 95°47′4″W

Links
- Public license information: Public file; LMS
- Website: www.ksnt.com

KSNT (channel 27) is a television station in Topeka, Kansas, United States, affiliated with NBC. It is owned by Nexstar Media Group alongside low-power, Class A Fox affiliate KTMJ-CD (channel 43); Nexstar also provides certain services to dual ABC affiliate/de facto CW+ owned-and-operated station KTKA-TV (channel 49) under joint sales and shared services agreements (JSA/SSA) with Vaughan Media, LLC. The stations share studios on Northwest 25th Street (US 24), near the unincorporated community of Kiro (with a Topeka mailing address), where KSNT's transmitter is also located.

== History ==
=== Early years ===
The station first signed on the air on December 28, 1967, as KTSB. It was originally owned by Ralph C. Wilson Jr., founding owner of the AFL (now NFL) franchise Buffalo Bills. It was the second commercial television station to sign on in the Topeka market, and the first full-powered UHF station in Kansas. The station has been an NBC affiliate from its debut. Unlike most then two-station markets, KTSB did not take a formal secondary affiliation with ABC, however it did clear a few shows aired by that network. It had little need to air many ABC programs as the network's two closest affiliates—KMBC-TV in Kansas City and KQTV in St. Joseph—both provide over-the-air signals that decently cover Topeka. After sharing ABC programming with CBS affiliate WIBW-TV (channel 13) for channel 27's first 16 years of operation, both stations lost the local rights to the network when KLDH (channel 49, now KTKA-TV) signed on in June 1983, becoming the market's first full-time ABC affiliate.

In 1982, George Hatch—owner of the Kansas State Network, a chain of NBC-affiliated stations originating at KARD-TV (now KSNW) in Wichita—purchased the station from Wilson. Later that year on August 16, the station changed its call letters to KSNT, as part of an effort to help viewers think of the KSN stations as part of one large network. Over the next few years, the station branded itself under the "KSN" name, but only provided limited simulcasts with KSNW and its three full-time satellite stations in western Kansas (KSNG in Garden City, KSNC in Great Bend and KSNK in McCook, Nebraska); as such, KSNT essentially acted as a de facto semi-satellite of KSNW.

SJL Communications (owned by George Lilly) purchased the station, along with KSNW, from Hatch in 1988; Lilly eventually had part of the microwave system that linked the two stations dismantled in a cost-cutting effort. In 1995, Davenport, Iowa–based Lee Enterprises acquired the Kansas State Network group as well as KSNT. On March 9, 2000, Lee Enterprises announced that it would sell its 16 television station properties, in order to focus on its newspaper and online businesses. Exactly two months later on May 9, 2000, Lee sold KSNT to Indianapolis-based Emmis Communications, as part of a $562.5 million group deal involving KSNW and its satellite stations, and CBS affiliate KMTV-TV in Omaha, Nebraska.

On May 15, 2005, Emmis Communications announced that it would sell its 16 television stations in order to concentrate on its portfolio of radio stations. On September 15, Emmis sold KSNT, KSNW and its satellites as well as CBS affiliate KOIN in Portland, Oregon, and Fox affiliate KHON-TV in Honolulu, Hawaii, to the Montecito Broadcast Group (formerly SJL Broadcast Group) for $259 million; the sale was finalized on January 27, 2006.

=== New Vision Television ownership, acquisition of KTMJ-CA and LMA with KTKA-TV ===
On July 24, 2007, Montecito announced that it would sell all of its stations (KSNT, KSNW and its satellites, as well as KHON-TV and KOIN) to New Vision Television. The sale closed on November 1 of that year. Subsequently, on July 7, 2008, New Vision Television announced its intention to buy Fox affiliate KTMJ-CA (channel 43) and its repeaters—KTLJ-CA (channel 6) in Junction City, KMJT-LP (channel 15) in Ogden and KETM-LP (channel 17) in Emporia—from Montgomery Communications. The purchase was completed on September 1. As a result, KTMJ relocated its operations into KSNT's facilities on Northwest 25th Street.

On February 4, 2011, Free State Communications announced that it would sell KTKA to Los Angeles–based PBC Broadcasting for $1.5 million. As part of the deal, New Vision Television – then-owner of KSNT, and which already maintained shared services and local marketing agreements with PBC-owned stations in Youngstown, Ohio, and Savannah, Georgia, would operate KTKA-TV under a local marketing agreement. Despite objections to the sale by the American Cable Association that alleged the sale could give the virtual triopoly involving KSNT, KTKA and KTMJ-CA too much leverage in negotiations for retransmission consent agreements, the Federal Communications Commission (FCC) approved the sale on July 21, 2011. PBC officially consummated on the purchase one week later on July 28. Two days later on July 30, KTKA relocated from its existing studio facility on 21st Street and Chelsea Drive in southwestern Topeka, and merged its operations with KSNT and KTMJ-CA at the two stations' facilities on Northwest 25th Street.

=== Sale to LIN Media, and then Media General, then Nexstar ===
On May 7, 2012, LIN TV Corporation announced that it would acquire the New Vision Television station group, including KSNT and KTMJ-CD, for $330.4 million and the assumption of $12 million in debt. Along with the outright ownership of KSNT and KTMJ, the agreement included the acquisition of New Vision's shared services agreement with PBC Broadcasting, giving LIN operational control of KTKA-TV. LIN and Vaughan Media (which concurrently purchased the PBC stations) also entered into a joint sales agreement to provide advertising services for KTKA. The sale of New Vision to LIN Media and KTKA's purchase by Vaughan Media was approved by the FCC on October 2, with the transaction closing on October 12, 2012. The deal marked a re-entry into Kansas for LIN, who briefly owned the licenses of Wichita ABC affiliate KAKE and its satellites in 2000, but never held operational control of the stations.

On March 21, 2014, Media General announced that it would purchase the LIN Media stations, including KSNT, KTMJ-CD, and the SSA/JSA with KTKA-TV, in a $1.6 billion merger. The FCC approved the merger on December 12, 2014, with the deal being consummated on December 19; however as a condition of the sale's approval, Media General was originally required to terminate the joint sales agreement between KTKA-TV and KSNT within two years, due to the FCC's ban on agreement involving the sale of advertising encompassing more than 15% of a separately-owned station's airtime. On September 28, 2015, Nexstar Broadcasting Group announced it had offered to purchase Media General and its stations, including KSNT and KTMJ. On January 27, 2016, Nexstar announced that it had reached an agreement to acquire Media General. The deal was approved by the FCC on January 11, 2017, and completed on January 17, marking Nexstar's entry into the Topeka market and reuniting KSNT with former sister station and fellow NBC affiliate KSNF in Joplin, Missouri.

=== KSNT-DT2 ===
On April 10, 2006, Montecito Broadcast Group signed an affiliation agreement with The CW in which KSNT-DT2 would serve as the network's Topeka affiliate. On September 18, 2006, Montecito took over the operations of "Northeast Kansas CW 5" (the channel number referencing its primary cable position in the market on Cox Communications), which originated as a cable-only affiliate of The WB 100+ Station Group—a national feed of The WB intended for smaller markets—when it launched on September 21, 1998, under the fictional call letters "WBKS" (branded on-air as "WB5"). Programming on KSNT-DT2 as a CW affiliate was received through The CW's small-market national feed The CW Plus; as The CW handles programming responsibilities for its CW Plus affiliates during non-network time periods, KSNT only provided local advertising services for the subchannel.

On November 1, 2008, KSNT-DT2 disaffiliated from The CW Plus, which moved to the third digital subchannel of ABC affiliate KTKA-TV, replacing it with a standard-definition simulcast of Fox affiliate KTMJ-CA to provide a digital signal for the low-power station and to extend its programming to the far northern and eastern fringes of the Topeka market.

== Programming ==
KSNT carries the entire NBC programming schedule, though the station airs NBC News Daily "live" with its airing in the Eastern Time Zone as a noontime offering, rather than its usual 1 p.m. Central slot on most affiliates.

=== News operation ===
KSNT presently broadcasts 26 hours of locally produced newscasts each week (with four hours each weekday and three hours each on Saturdays and Sundays). Unlike most NBC affiliates, the station does not carry newscasts on weekday middays. In addition, KSNT presently produces an additional 13 1/2 hours of locally produced newscasts each week for Fox affiliate KTMJ-CD (consisting of 2 1/2 hours on weekdays and a half-hour each on Saturdays and Sundays); KSNT also simulcasts its weekday morning and weeknight 10 p.m. newscast on KTKA-TV.

From its sign-on, KSNT's newscasts have traditionally placed second behind the longer-established WIBW-TV, although it placed far ahead of the perennial third place KTKA-TV after that station signed on in 1983 as KLDH. As a part-time member of the Kansas State Network, KSNT was one of only two stations in the group (along with KSNF in Joplin, Missouri, another former KSNW semi-satellite) that maintained a full in-house news department separate from KSNW; however, KSNT provided news content focusing on northeast Kansas to KSNW and the other KSN stations, while KSNW provided news stories focusing on central and western Kansas to KSNT in turn. While in its role as airing partial simulcasts of KSNW programming, the station used the "Hello News" music package by Frank Gari for its newscasts and station imaging from 1982 to 1986.

In September 2003, KSNT gradually scaled back its sports department, with the departures of sports director Leo Doyle, and later, weekend sports anchor Katrina Hancock; during this time, the station's evening anchors provided sports-related stories on Monday through Thursday evenings, while sports content aired in the form of a standalone segment within the newscasts on Friday through Sunday evenings; this lasted until April 2004, when Lance Veeser was hired as KSNT's sports director. In April 2009, following that station's purchase by New Vision Television, KSNT began producing a two-hour weekday morning newscast at 7 a.m. and a half-hour newscast at 9 p.m. weeknights for Fox affiliate KTMJ-CA, replacing news simulcasts from fellow Fox station WDAF-TV in Kansas City in those timeslots.

As a result of KTKA's sale to PBC Broadcasting and local marketing agreement with New Vision Television, KSNT took over production of channel 49's newscasts, using existing staff from both stations. KSNT started producing channel 49's newscasts the following day on July 30 – beginning with the 6 p.m. newscast – under the uniform branding Kansas First News (which also encompassed the prime time newscast on KTMJ, in an arrangement similar to other joint news operations involving virtual triopolies such as Hawaii News Now involving Raycom Media and American Spirit Media–owned stations in Honolulu and Granite Broadcasting/Malara Broadcast Group's Indiana's NewsCenter operation in Fort Wayne, Indiana, and Northland's NewsCenter operation in Duluth, Minnesota), with the two stations initially simulcasting newscasts on weekday mornings and at 6 and 10 p.m., while KSNT aired a 5 p.m. newscast that is exclusive to the station; On May 4, 2013, KSNT and KTKA respectively became the second and third (and last) television stations in the Topeka market to begin broadcasting its local newscasts in high definition.

Beginning with the 5 p.m. newscast on January 26, 2015, KSNT quietly dropped the Kansas First News brand, with the introduction of a new graphics package and news set, as well as a uniform logo scheme for all three stations (consisting of only the station's respective call letters and the logo of their affiliated network), with newscasts on KSNT, KTMJ and KTKA being rebranded as KSNT News. KTMJ has been rebranded as Fox 43 News @ 9.

On March 25, 2022, KSNT introduced a new logo and revived the 27 News brand across newscasts seen on both KSNT and KTKA. Newscasts continued to use the previous graphics and music from the KSNT News brand at the time.

==== Notable former on-air staff ====
- Craig Bolerjack – sports anchor
- Campbell Brown – reporter
- Steve Doocy – meteorologist
- Bill Karins – meteorologist
- Alycia Lane – anchor/reporter
- Jon Leiberman – reporter
- Brent Stover – sports anchor

== Technical information ==
=== Subchannels ===
The station's digital signal is multiplexed:

Subchannels of KSNT
Channel	Res.	Short name	Programming
27.1	1080i	KSNT-DT	NBC
27.2	720p	FOX	Fox (KTMJ-CD)
27.3	480i	ION	Ion
27.4	480i	Bounce	Bounce TV

Simulcast of subchannels of another station

=== Analog-to-digital conversion ===
KSNT shut down its analog signal, over UHF channel 27, on June 12, 2009, the official date on which full-power television stations in the United States transitioned from analog to digital broadcasts under federal mandate. The station's digital signal relocated from its pre-transition UHF channel 28 to channel 27.
