= KTMJ-CD =

Television station in Topeka, Kansas

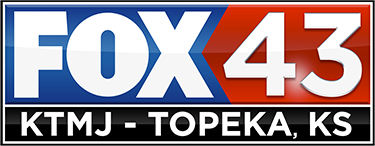
- Topeka, Kansas; United States
- Channels: Digital: 20 (UHF); Virtual: 43
- Branding: Fox 43 KTMJ; Fox 43 News

Programming
- Affiliations: 43.1: Fox; for others, see § Subchannels

Ownership
- Owner: Nexstar Media Group; (Nexstar Media Inc.)
- Sister stations: KSNT, KTKA-TV

History
- Founded: August 8, 1986
- First air date: October 31, 1989
- Former call signs: K15BQ (1989–1994); K43EO (1994–2001); KTLJ-LP (2001–2003); KTMJ-CA (2003–2012)
- Former channel numbers: Analog: 15 (UHF, 1989–1994), 43 (UHF, 1994–2012); Digital: 43 (UHF, 2012–2020)
- Former affiliations: Independent (1982–1995); UPN (1995–1996); The WB (secondary, 1995–1996); UPN (secondary, 1996–2003)
- Call sign meaning: Kansas, Topeka, Manhattan, Junction City

Technical information
- Licensing authority: FCC
- Facility ID: 43649
- Class: CD
- ERP: 15 kW
- HAAT: 399.9 m (1,312 ft)
- Transmitter coordinates: 39°1′34″N 95°55′2″W
- Translator(s): KSNT-DT 27.2 Topeka

Links
- Public license information: Public file; LMS
- Website: www.ksnt.com

KTMJ-CD (channel 43) is a low-power, Class A television station in Topeka, Kansas, United States, affiliated with the Fox network. It is owned by Nexstar Media Group alongside NBC affiliate KSNT (channel 27); Nexstar also provides certain services to dual ABC affiliate/de facto CW+ owned-and-operated station KTKA-TV (channel 49) under joint sales and shared services agreements (JSA/SSA) with Vaughan Media, LLC. The stations share studios on Northwest 25th Street (US 24), near the unincorporated community of Kiro (with a Topeka mailing address); KTMJ-CD's transmitter is located along Southwest West Union Road west of Topeka.

Even though KTMJ-CD operates a digital signal of its own, the low-power broadcasting radius does not reach the northern and eastern fringes of the Topeka market. Therefore, the station is simulcast in high definition on KSNT's second digital subchannel in order to reach the entire market. This signal can be seen on channel 27.2 from KSNT's transmitter at the Northwest 25th Street studios.

== History ==
=== Early history ===
KTMJ traces its roots to the March 31, 1983, sign-on of K06KZ in Junction City, an independent station which broadcast on VHF channel 6. In 1987, the station changed its call letters to KTMJ-LP (representing the station's service area of Topeka, Manhattan and Junction City); however, the station was referenced as "KTMJ-TV 6" in the Kansas City edition of TV Guide and Topeka area newspapers. KETM-LP signed on the air on November 30, 1988, as K17CK; also operating as an independent station initially, it was eventually converted into a repeater of the Junction City station, which served as the main signal. On March 30, 2011, it surrendered its Class A designation and reverted to a standard LPTV license; at that time, the station changed its call letters to KETM-LP. KMJT-CA began operating on August 4, 1992, as K15DQ; it became a Class A repeater of the original Junction City signal on September 24, 2001. Channel 43 originally maintained studio facilities located on Southgate Drive in southwestern Topeka.

On January 16, 1995, KTMJ-LP became a primary affiliate of the United Paramount Network (UPN) and a secondary affiliate of The WB. While the station aired UPN's Monday and Tuesday night programming in pattern, KTMJ carried The WB's initial Wednesday lineup on a week-delayed basis on Sunday nights to accommodate the Prime Time Entertainment Network (PTEN) on Wednesday nights. In September 1995, KTMJ moved the delayed WB Wednesday lineup to Saturdays in order to carry the network's new Sunday schedule in pattern; it also added both networks' new children's programming blocks (UPN Kids and Kids' WB), running their weekend lineups back-to-back on Sunday mornings and early afternoons as part of a seven-hour block of network and syndicated cartoons. On April 1, 1996, the station became a primary affiliate of the Fox Broadcasting Company and shifted UPN to secondary status; this would leave the Topeka market without a local WB affiliate until the September 1998 launch of cable-only WB 100+ affiliate "WBKS" (now CW Plus affiliate KTKA-DT3, and operated at the time by KSNT). Until then, area residents would have to rely on either the superstation feed of Chicago affiliate WGN-TV or, upon its September 1996 sign-on, Kansas City affiliate KCWB (now CW affiliate KCWE) to view WB programming.

In 2001, then-owner Montgomery Communications reassigned the KTMJ-CA call letters to the repeater on UHF channel 43 in Topeka, converting that outlet—which was also re-designated as a Class A station—into the flagship station of the group. At that time, channel 17 became a Class A station and changed its call letters to KETM-CA, subsequently becoming a repeater of channel 43. The Junction City station that originally held the KTMJ calls also had its call letters changed to KTLJ-CA. With the reassignment of the Topeka station as the originating station for KTMJ, Montgomery Communications relocated the station's operations from Junction City to facilities on Southgate Drive in southwest Topeka; master control operations remained in Junction City, before moving to the Topeka facility in May 2004. KTMJ-CA and its repeaters dropped the secondary UPN affiliation in 2003.

=== New Vision Television ownership ===
On July 7, 2008, New Vision Television (owner of NBC affiliate KSNT) announced its intention to buy KTMJ and its repeaters from Montgomery Communications. The purchase was completed on September 1. As a result, KTMJ relocated its operations into KSNT's facilities on Northwest 25th Street. In November 2008, KSNT began providing a simulcast of KTMJ-CA on its second digital subchannel, replacing CW Plus affiliate "Northeast Kansas CW 5" (which concurrently moved to present-day sister station KTKA-TV).

=== Sale to LIN Media, and then Media General ===
On May 7, 2012, LIN TV Corporation announced that it would acquire the New Vision Television station group, including KSNT and KTMJ-CD, for $330.4 million and the assumption of $12 million in debt. Along with the outright ownership of KSNT and KTMJ, the agreement included the acquisition of New Vision's shared services agreement with PBC Broadcasting, giving LIN operational control of KTKA-TV. LIN and Vaughan Media (which concurrently purchased the PBC stations) also entered into a joint sales agreement to provide advertising services for KTKA. The sale of New Vision to LIN Media and KTKA's purchase by Vaughan Media was approved by the FCC on October 2, with the transaction closing on October 12, 2012. The deal marked a re-entry into Kansas for LIN, who briefly owned the licenses of Wichita ABC affiliate KAKE and its satellites in 2000, but never held operational control of the stations.

On March 21, 2014, Media General announced that it would purchase the LIN Media stations, including KSNT, KTMJ-CD, and the SSA/JSA with KTKA-TV, in a $1.6 billion merger. The FCC approved the merger on December 12, 2014, with the deal being consummated on December 19; however as a condition of the sale's approval, Media General was originally required to terminate the joint sales agreement between KTKA-TV and KSNT within two years, due to the FCC's ban on agreements involving the sale of advertising encompassing more than 15% of a separately-owned station's airtime.

The FCC canceled the licenses for KMJT-LP (on April 3, 2017) and KETM-LP (on April 27, 2017).

== Newscasts ==
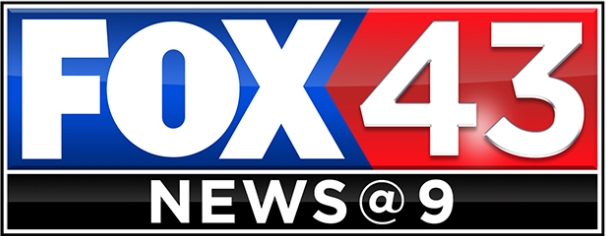
KTMJ's own News Logo used since May 1, 2017.

KSNT presently produces 13 1/2 hours of locally produced newscasts each week for KTMJ-CD (consisting of 2 1/2 hours each weekday and a half-hour each on Saturdays and Sundays); the weekend editions of the 9 p.m. newscast are occasionally preempted on certain Saturday and/or Sunday evenings whenever Fox schedules sports programming in prime time that is expected to run into that hour, as KSNT cannot air the program on delay due to its late-evening news simulcast on KSNT and KTKA-TV.

KTMJ-CD, as a Junction City-based station, began broadcasting local news programming in 1988, running news updates focusing on Junction City and Manhattan; the station launched a half-hour prime time newscast at 9 p.m. in 1995. After KTMJ moved its call letters and operations to Topeka in 2001, the station canceled its prime time newscast, replacing it with 60- to 90-second news updates on an hourly basis from 8 a.m. to 2 a.m., anchored primarily by KTMJ news director Gary Brauer.

In April 2007, KTMJ began airing newscasts from fellow Fox affiliate WDAF-TV in Kansas City, simulcasting that station's weekday morning and nightly 9 p.m. newscasts. Following New Vision's purchase of KTMJ-CA, KSNT decided to launch Topeka-focused newscasts produced specifically for the station; on October 31, 2008, KSNT replaced the WDAF morning news simulcast with Good Day Live, a two-hour weekday morning newscast at 7 a.m., using anchors and meteorologists seen on KSNT's morning newscast. Four months later on February 10, 2009, the prime time news simulcast from WDAF was replaced by a half-hour newscast at 9 p.m. on Monday through Friday evenings.

As a result of KTKA's sale to PBC Broadcasting and local marketing agreement with then-KSNT owner New Vision Television, KSNT took over production of KTKA's newscasts, using existing staff from both stations. Newscasts on KSNT, KTKA and KTMJ were relaunched on July 30, under the uniform branding Kansas First News, consisting of the existing KTKA and KTMJ newscasts as well as news simulcasts between KTKA and KSNT; On May 4, 2013, KSNT and KTKA respectively became the second and third (and last) television stations in the Topeka market to begin broadcasting its local newscasts in high definition; the morning and prime time newscasts on KTMJ were included in the upgrade.

On January 26, 2015, KSNT quietly dropped the Kansas First News brand, with the introduction of a new graphics package and news set, as well as a uniform logo scheme for all three stations (consisting of only the station's respective call letters and the logo of their affiliated network; the Fox wordmark in the case of KTMJ-CD), with newscasts on KSNT, KTMJ and KTKA being rebranded as KSNT News. Subsequently, on January 30, KTMJ expanded its 9 p.m. newscast to Saturday and Sunday evenings.

== Technical information ==
=== Subchannels ===
The station's signal is multiplexed:

Subchannels of KTMJ-CD
Channel	Res.	Short name	Programming
43.1	720p	KTMJ	Fox
43.2	480i	Escape	Ion Mystery
43.3	480i	Grit	Grit
43.4	480i	Laff	Laff

=== Analog-to-digital transition ===
On September 1, 2010, KTMJ-CA filed an application with the Federal Communications Commission to flash-cut its digital signal into operation on its existing analog allocation on UHF channel 43; the FCC granted a construction permit to build the digital transmitter facility for KTMJ on September 28. On September 29, 2011, KTMJ-CA began broadcasting its programming in high definition.

=== Former translators ===
KTMJ-CD operated a translator station that relayed the station's signal to the majority of the Topeka market. KTLJ originally held the KTMJ-CA (originally K06KZ from 1982 to 1995 and KTMJ-LP from 1995 to 2001) call letters, before the channel 43 signal in Topeka took over as the main station. KTLJ-CA had an application to broadcast its digital signal on UHF channel 46 from a transmitter on a tower located off of Liberty Hall Road (west of Junction City) currently occupied by University of Kansas–owned radio station KANV (91.3 FM). The license was canceled on June 1, 2014.

- KTLJ-CA 6 Junction City
- KMJT-LP 15 Ogden
- KETM-LP 17 Emporia
