= Kiro, Kansas =

Unincorporated community in Shawnee County, Kansas

- Unincorporated community
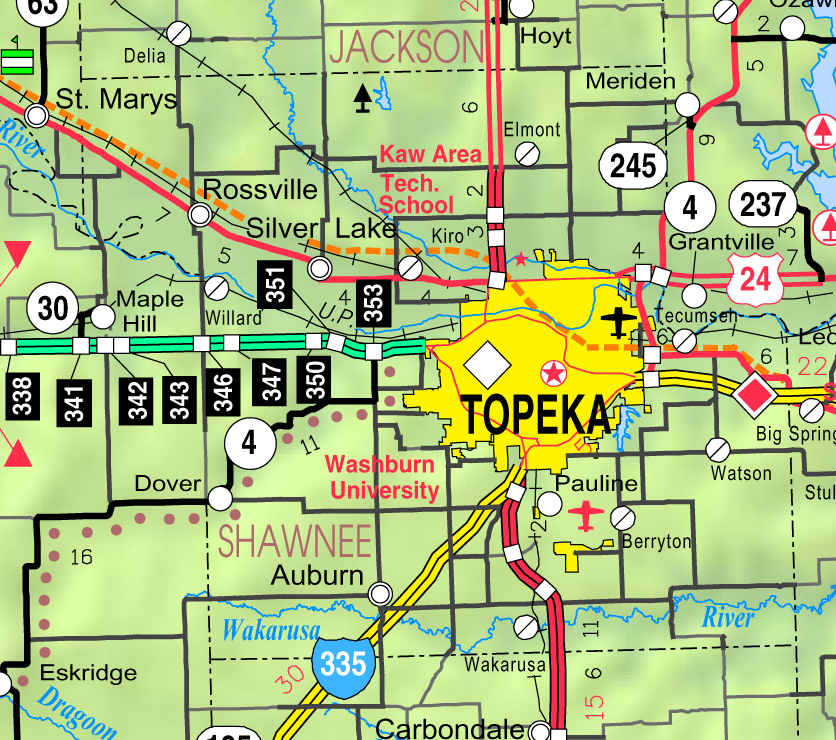
- KDOT map of Shawnee County (legend)

- Location within Kansas Location within the United States
- Coordinates: 39°05′49″N 95°47′52″W
- Country: United States
- State: Kansas
- County: Shawnee
- Elevation: 902 ft (275 m)
- Time zone: UTC-6 (CST)
  - Summer (DST): UTC-5 (CDT)
- Area code: 785
- FIPS code: 20-37250
- GNIS ID: 478659

Kiro is an unincorporated community in Shawnee County, Kansas, United States.

== Education ==
The community is served by Silver Lake USD 372 public school district.
