= Marny Stanier =

American television meteorologist

Marny Stanier (Midkiff) (born April 8, 1962) is an American former television meteorologist best known for her work at The Weather Channel, where she appeared from April 1987 to November 2003.

In late 2003, Stanier was dismissed during a company-wide staff reduction. She subsequently filed a lawsuit against The Weather Channel, alleging age and sex discrimination. The lawsuit accused management of targeting older female meteorologists in an effort to project a younger on-air image. The case was settled out of court in mid-2006 for an undisclosed amount.

After leaving broadcasting, Stanier transitioned to a career in real estate in the Atlanta, Georgia area.
