= KSNW =

Television station in Wichita, Kansas

- Wichita, Kansas; United States
- Channels: Digital: 15 (UHF); Virtual: 3
- Branding: KSN; KSN News 3; Telemundo Kansas (3.2)

Programming
- Network: Kansas State Network
- Affiliations: 3.1: NBC; 3.2: Telemundo; for others, see § Subchannels

Ownership
- Owner: Nexstar Media Group; (Nexstar Media Inc.)
- Sister stations: KSNC; KSNK; KSNG; KSNL-LD

History
- First air date: September 1, 1955
- Former call signs: KTVR (CP, 1952–1955); KARD-TV (1955–1982)
- Former channel numbers: Analog: 3 (VHF, 1955–2009); Digital: 45 (UHF, 2001–2020)
- Former affiliations: Independent (1955–1956)
- Call sign meaning: Kansas State Network Wichita

Technical information
- Licensing authority: FCC
- Facility ID: 72358
- ERP: 650 kW
- HAAT: 312.8 m (1,026 ft)
- Transmitter coordinates: 37°46′26″N 97°30′53″W
- Translator(s): see § Semi-satellites

Links
- Public license information: Public file; LMS
- Website: www.ksn.com; www.ksn.com/telemundo/

KSNW (channel 3) is a television station in Wichita, Kansas, United States, affiliated with NBC and Telemundo. The station is owned by Nexstar Media Group, and maintains studios on North Main Street in northwest Wichita (near downtown); its transmitter is located in rural northwestern Sedgwick County (east-southeast of Colwich).

KSNW serves as the flagship of the Kansas State Network (KSN), a regional network of five stations (four full-power and one low-power) relaying NBC network programming and other shows provided by KSNW across central and western Kansas, as well as bordering counties in Nebraska and Oklahoma.

== History ==
The station first signed on the air on September 1, 1955, as KARD-TV. The station, owned by the Wichita Television Corporation was the fourth television station to sign on in the Wichita–Hutchinson market, after KAKE (channel 10)—which signed on in October 1954, KEDD (channel 16)—which signed on in August 1953, and KTVH (channel 12, now KWCH-DT)—which signed on in July 1953. It was initially an independent station, but joined NBC on May 1, 1956, forcing KEDD to shut down. As a result, Wichita became one of the smallest U.S. cities to have three television stations that each held exclusive affiliations with one of the major networks.

In 1962, after the Federal Communications Commission (FCC) ruled that central and western Kansas was part of the Wichita market, KARD was purchased by Central Kansas Television and was merged with its three other stations, KCKT (channel 2) in Great Bend and its satellites KGLD (channel 11) in Garden City and KOMC-TV (channel 8) in Oberlin. The three stations, which were collectively branded as the "Tri-Circle Network", relayed NBC programming throughout central and western Kansas. The Tri-Circle Network changed its name to the "Kansas State Network", with KARD serving as the flagship of the new four-station regional network. During the 1960s and 1970s, KCKT relayed its programming on K18AA (channel 18) in Salina, which eventually became a Fox affiliate. The stations eventually expanded their signals to reach 75% of Kansas as well as portions of Nebraska; KSN now claims to reach half of all households with at least one television set in the state of Kansas.

The call letters of all four stations were changed on August 16, 1982, to help viewers think of the four stations as part of one large network. KARD changed its calls to KSNW, KCKT became KSNC, KGLD became KSNG and KOMC became KSNK (the KARD-TV call letters are now used by a Fox-affiliated television station in Monroe, Louisiana, which became a sister station to KSNW upon the Nexstar-Media General merger). In 1988, the KSN stations were acquired by SJL Broadcast Management. The stations were then sold to Lee Enterprises in 1995. Emmis Communications bought most of Lee Enterprises' television properties in 2000. Montecito Broadcast Group, a newly formed partnership between SJL and the private equity firm Blackstone Group, acquired the KSN stations from Emmis on January 27, 2006.

On July 24, 2007, Montecito announced the sale of its four stations (KSNW, KHON-TV in Honolulu, KOIN in Portland, Oregon, and KSNT in Topeka, as well as satellites of KSNW and KHON) to New Vision Television; the sale was finalized on November 1, 2007. In 2008, KSNW acquired low-power station K06LZ (channel 6, the former K18AA) in Salina, to serve as its repeater in central Kansas; that station was replaced in May of that year by a digital repeater, KSNL-LD.

On May 7, 2012, the LIN TV Corporation announced that it would acquire the New Vision Television station group, including KSNW and its four satellite stations, for $330.4 million and the assumption of $12 million in debt; the sale—which was approved by the FCC on October 2 and was completed 1 1/2 weeks later on October 12—marked a re-entry into Kansas for LIN, which briefly owned the licenses of KAKE and its satellites in 2000, before selling them to Benedek Broadcasting shortly after the purchase was finalized.

On March 21, 2014, Media General announced that it would purchase LIN Media and its stations, including KSNW, in a $1.6 billion merger—giving the station its sixth owner since 2000. Like the earlier acquisition of KSNW by LIN, this deal marked Media General's re-entry to the market, as it previously owned KWCH from 2000 to 2006. The merger was completed on December 19. On September 28, 2015, Nexstar Broadcasting Group announced it had offered to purchase Media General and its stations, including KSNW and its satellites. On January 27, 2016, Nexstar announced that it had reached an agreement to acquire Media General. The acquisition of KSNW and its satellites by Nexstar reunited the stations with former satellite KSNF, whose ownership was split from the rest of the Kansas State Network in 1986. The deal was approved by the FCC on January 11, 2017, and it was completed on January 17, marking Nexstar's first entry into the Wichita market.

== News operation ==
KSNW presently broadcasts 31 hours of locally produced newscasts each week (with five hours each weekday, and three hours each on Saturdays and Sundays). Despite being the first television station in the market to build a network of semi-satellites in the western and central parts of the state, KSNW's newscasts had lagged far behind rivals KWCH and KAKE for several decades. In recent years, however, KSNW has waged a spirited battle with KAKE for second place behind long-dominant KWCH, with the two stations regularly trading the runner-up slot in several timeslots.

Although the three KSN satellites originated their own newscasts for many years, their local operations were progressively cut back from the mid-1980s onward. By the start of the 21st century, local news programming on the other Kansas State Network stations had been reduced to inserts shown during KSNW's newscasts, and separate station identifications had largely been eliminated.

On April 26, 1991, as an F2 tornado approached their vehicle, a KSNW news crew took shelter underneath an overpass in Butler County. Video of the event that was captured by a station photographer accompanying reporters Ted Lewis and Gregg Jarrett resulted in public misunderstanding that overpasses provided adequate shelter from tornadoes as it did not take a direct hit from the tornado, experiencing only strong outer winds; the National Weather Service now strongly advises against sheltering under overpasses due to the likelihood of fatalities caused by flying debris, dangers from wind channeling, changes in wind direction and wind speed increases above ground level as the vortex passes, and the lack of girders on most overpasses. The station received national headlines again on May 19, 2013, when then-chief meteorologist Dave Freeman ordered the KSNW staff to take shelter as an EF2 tornado approached the southern portions of Wichita, out of concern that it would also hit the station's downtown studios.

On September 29, 1997, KSNW began producing a half-hour prime time newscast at 9 p.m. for Fox affiliate KSAS-TV (channel 24), as part of a news share agreement in which channel 3 would also produce news updates to air during KSAS's evening programs. The program was canceled on December 31, 1998, due to low ratings. In January 2009, KSNW acquired regional cable news channel Kansas Now 22, which is carried locally on Cox Communications, from Gray Television (owners of KAKE, and WIBW-TV in Topeka) to produce its own news and weather content for the channel and provide rebroadcasts of its local newscasts.

On October 31, 2010, KSNW began broadcasting its local newscasts in widescreen standard definition; in-studio, field and other station camera feeds were upconverted to a 16:9 format in the control room. On January 30, 2011, KSNW began broadcasting the weather segments of its newscasts in high definition, with the remaining in-studio segments following suit on July 17 (when KAKE upgraded its newscasts from 4:3 standard definition to 16:9 high definition), becoming the third television station in the Wichita–Hutchinson market to begin broadcasting its local newscasts in high definition; video from the field remained in widescreen standard definition. In June 2011, KSNW underwent major staff changes for its 10 p.m. newscast with the shifts of weekend anchors Brooke Martin and Jamison Coyle and meteorologist J. D. Rudd (all of whom have since left the station) to the weeknight broadcasts, citing higher ratings for with that team on weekends than on the weeknight newscasts. Upon the shakeup, longtime sports director Jim Kobbe left KSNW; while chief meteorologist Dave Freeman moved from the 10 p.m. newscast to the 5 and 6 p.m. broadcasts (Freeman added the 10 p.m. newscast back to his duties for several years before his retirement from the station in 2017).

KSNW re-assumed production responsibilities for KSAS's newscast on January 2, 2012, after KWCH (which had produced the current 9 p.m. newscast since 2003) ended its news share agreement with channel 24 to focus on its newscasts for CW-affiliated sister station KSCW-DT (channel 33). The KSAS newscast is produced out of KSNW's main news set, which features separate duratrans for the channel 24 broadcast. On January 27, 2014, KSNW upgraded its field and other non-studio cameras to HD; with the upgrade, came the introduction of a new HD-ready news set and graphics package.

=== Notable former on-air staff ===
- Melissa Beck – anchor
- Gregg Jarrett – reporter
- Todd McDermott – anchor/reporter

== Technical information ==
=== Subchannels ===
The station's signal is multiplexed:

Subchannels of KSNW
Subchannel	Res.	Short name	Programming
3.1	1080i	KSNW-DT	NBC
3.2	1080i	T'Mundo	Telemundo
3.3	480i	ION	Ion
3.4	480i	BUSTED	Busted
36.3	480i	Charge!	Charge! (KMTW)

Broadcast on behalf of another station

=== Analog-to-digital conversion ===
KSNW shut down its analog signal, over VHF channel 3, on June 12, 2009, the official date on which full-power television stations in the United States transitioned from analog to digital broadcasts under federal mandate. The station's digital signal remained on its pre-transition UHF channel 45, using virtual channel 3.

== Kansas State Network ==
KSNW operates a network of four full-power stations and one low-power station covering central and western Kansas, branded as the Kansas State Network. These stations air virtually the exact programming as KSNW, apart from local news inserts and advertisements targeted to their respective viewing area. During severe weather events, KSN airs severe weather coverage only in the affected portions of the region (for example, a tornado warning for Reno County is covered on KSNW while the other KSN stations air regular programming).

Nielsen Media Research treats KSNW and its semi-satellites as one station in local ratings books, using the identifier name KSNW+.

=== Current semi-satellites ===
Station	City of license (other locations served)	Channels (VC / RF)	First air date	Fourth letter in calls meaning	Former callsigns	Former channel numbers	ERP (Digital)	HAAT (Digital)	Facility ID	Transmitter coordinates	Public license information
KSNC	Great Bend (Hays/Salina)	2; 22 (UHF)	November 28, 1954	Central Kansas	KCKT (1954–1982)	2 (analog VHF, 1954–2008)	500 kW	261.1 m (857 ft)	72359	38°25′54.1″N 98°46′19.8″W	Public file LMS
KSNG	Garden City (Dodge City)	11; 11 (VHF)	November 5, 1958	Garden City	KGLD (1958–1982)	Analog: 11 (VHF, 1958–2009); Digital: 16 (UHF, until 2009)	7.4 kW	239 m (784 ft)	72361	37°46′43.2″N 100°52′10″W	Public file LMS
KSNK	McCook, NE (Oberlin)	8; 12 (VHF)	November 28, 1959	Nebraska and Kansas	KOMC (1959–1982)	8 (analog VHF, 1959–2008)	10.4 kW	218 m (715 ft)	72362	39°49′5″N 100°42′4.6″W	Public file LMS
KSNL-LD	Salina	6; 23 (UHF)	May 2008	Salina	K74CN (1964–1967), K18AA (1967–1988), K06LZ (1988–2008), K47KV-D (2008 CP)	47 (2008-2018)	15 kW	285.4 m (936 ft)	168675	38°53′0.9″N 99°20′15.7″W	LMS

KSNC and KSNK shut down their analog signals on VHF channels 2 and 8 on June 12, 2009, with KSNC broadcasting its digital signal on UHF channel 22 and KSNK broadcasting its digital signal on VHF channel 12, using their former respective analog channel assignments as their virtual channels.

=== Former semi-satellites ===
Both KSNT and KSNF provided limited simulcasts of KSNW's programming from 1982 until SJL Communications purchased the station from George Hatch in 1988, when it dismantled part of the microwave system that allowed KSNF and KSNT access to KSNW's programming in a cost-cutting measure. As a result, both stations are the only ones to have been part of the Kansas State Network in some capacity to maintain their own separate programming and news departments to this day.

Station	Channels (Digital)	City of license/market	Information
KSNT	27 / 27	Topeka	KSNT only carried limited simulcasts of KSNW's programming from 1982 to 1988. During its first year as a KSN semi-satellite, KSNT shared a secondary ABC affiliation with CBS affiliate WIBW-TV, ending when KTKA signed on in 1983 (KSNT exclusively affiliated with NBC and WIBW exclusively affiliated with CBS at that point). It remained a sister station of KSNW throughout.
KSNF	16 / 17	Joplin, MO/ Pittsburg, KS	Like KSNT, KSNF only carried limited simulcasts of KSNW's programming until it was completely separated from KSNW in 1988. From 1988 to 2017, it was under separate ownership from the KSN stations and KSNT (it was acquired by Nexstar in 1998). Despite this, KSNF retained the use of the "KSN" brand (Newscasts are called KSN Hometown News), although it does not use the logo used by KSNW and its satellites. KSNF continued using the original KSN logo longer than KSNW did. The acquisition of KSNW (and its satellites) and KSNT by Nexstar in 2017 meant that they are sister stations once again after a 29-year separation.
