= KSNL-LD =

NBC affiliate in Salina, Kansas

Semi-satellite of KSNW, Wichita, Kansas
- Salina, Kansas; United States
- Channels: Digital: 23 (UHF); Virtual: 6
- Branding: KSN (general); KSN News Salina (local news); KSN News (state news)

Programming
- Network: Kansas State Network
- Affiliations: NBC

Ownership
- Owner: Nexstar Media Group; (Nexstar Media Inc.)
- Sister stations: KSNW; KSNC; KSNF; KSNG

History
- First air date: December 13, 1964
- Former call signs: K74CN (1964–1967); K18AA (1967–1988); K06LZ (1988–2008); K47KV-D (2008)
- Former channel numbers: Analog: 74 (UHF, 1964–1967), 18 (UHF, 1967–1988), 6 (VHF, 1989–2008); Digital: 47 (UHF, 2008–2018)
- Call sign meaning: Kansas State Network Salina

Technical information
- Licensing authority: FCC
- Facility ID: 168675
- Class: LD
- ERP: 15 kW
- HAAT: 54.4 m (178 ft)
- Transmitter coordinates: 38°50′29″N 97°40′4″W

Links
- Public license information: LMS
- Website: www.ksn.com

KSNL-LD (channel 6) is a low-power television station in Salina, Kansas, United States, affiliated with NBC and owned by Nexstar Media Group. The station's studios are located on North Santa Fe Avenue in downtown Salina, and its transmitter is located on State Street and Halsted Road in unincorporated Saline County (west of the Salina city limits).

KSNL-LD is part of the Kansas State Network (KSN), a regional network of five stations relaying programming from Wichita NBC affiliate KSNW (channel 3) across central and western Kansas, as well as bordering counties in Nebraska and Oklahoma; KSNL-LD incorporates local advertising and news inserts aimed at Salina and surrounding areas within the Wichita–Hutchinson Plus television market.

== History ==
The Kansas State Network first established a presence in Salina on December 13, 1964, when a channel 74 translator of Great Bend's KCKT-TV was activated. The translator moved to channel 18 (as K18AA) in 1967, where it remained until it was displaced by the sign-on of full-power KAAS-TV in 1988; it then moved to channel 6 as K06LZ. The station flash cut to digital on channel 47 as KSNL-LD in 2008.

On May 7, 2012, the LIN TV Corporation announced that it would acquire the New Vision Television station group, including KSNW and its four satellite stations, for $330.4 million and the assumption of $12 million in debt; the sale – which was approved by the FCC on October 2 and was completed 1 1/2 weeks later on October 12 – marked a re-entry to Kansas for LIN, which briefly owned the licenses of K51GC (channel 51, now KHDS-LD), a low-power repeater of Wichita ABC affiliate KAKE-TV (channel 10), in 2000, before selling them to Benedek Broadcasting shortly after the purchase was finalized.

On March 21, 2014, Media General announced that it would purchase LIN Media and its stations, including the KSN stations, in a $1.6 billion merger. The deal marked Media General's re-entry into the market, as it previously owned KBSH-TV (channel 7), a satellite of Wichita CBS affiliate KWCH-TV (channel 12), from 2000 to 2006. The merger was completed on December 19. On September 28, 2015, Nexstar Broadcasting Group announced it had offered to purchase Media General and its stations, including KSNW and its satellites. On January 27, 2016, Nexstar announced that it had reached an agreement to acquire Media General. The acquisition of KSNL and its other satellites by Nexstar reunited the stations with former satellite KSNF, whose ownership was split from the rest of the Kansas State Network in 1986. The deal was approved by the FCC on January 11, 2017, and it was completed on January 17, marking Nexstar's first entry into the Wichita market.

== Subchannel ==
KSNL-LD does not provide the other subchannels that the full-power KSN stations do.

Subchannel of KSNL-LD
Subchannel	Res.	Short name	Programming
6.1	1080i	KSNL-LD	NBC
