= KSNF =

Television station in Joplin, Missouri

- Joplin, Missouri; Pittsburg, Kansas; United States
- City: Joplin, Missouri
- Channels: Digital: 17 (UHF); Virtual: 16
- Branding: KSN 16; KSN 16 Local News

Programming
- Affiliations: 16.1: NBC; for others, see § Subchannels

Ownership
- Owner: Nexstar Media Group; (Nexstar Media Inc.)
- Sister stations: KODE-TV

History
- First air date: January 4, 1968
- Former call signs: KUHI-TV (1968–1975); KTVJ (1975–1982)
- Former channel numbers: Analog: 16 (UHF, 1968–2009); Digital: 46 (UHF, 2003–2019)
- Former affiliations: CBS (1968–1982)
- Call sign meaning: Kansas State Network Four States (reflecting former status as semi-satellite of KSNW)

Technical information
- Licensing authority: FCC
- Facility ID: 67766
- ERP: 525 kW
- HAAT: 319.8 m (1,049 ft)
- Transmitter coordinates: 37°4′33″N 94°33′17″W

Links
- Public license information: Public file; LMS
- Website: www.fourstateshomepage.com

KSNF (channel 16) is a television station licensed to Joplin, Missouri, United States, serving as the NBC network affiliate for southwest Missouri and southeast Kansas. It is owned by Nexstar Media Group, which provides certain services to ABC affiliate KODE-TV (channel 12, also licensed to Joplin) under joint sales and shared services agreements (JSA/SSA) with owner Mission Broadcasting. The two stations share studios on South Cleveland Avenue in Joplin, where KSNF's transmitter is also located.

== History ==
KUHI-TV logo, April 1974.

The station first signed on as KUHI-TV (for "Ultra High Frequency") on January 4, 1968, as a CBS affiliate. KUHI was the first station in the Joplin–Pittsburg market to broadcast on the UHF band.

It was originally owned by Marvin Caldwell & Associates. Mid-America Broadcasting sold the station to the owners of the Kansas State Network and changed its call letters to KTVJ ("Television for Joplin") in 1975. On August 23, 1982, the station changed its call letters to KSNF, and almost two weeks later on September 5, swapped affiliations with KOAM-TV (channel 7) to become an NBC affiliate. The station did limited simulcasting with Wichita NBC affiliate KSNW. KSN then sold KSNF to Price Communications in 1986, but the station continued the partial simulcast with KSNW. It stopped simulcasting KSNW completely after George Lilly (SJL Communications) acquired the KSN stations and, in a cost-cutting effort, cut the microwave links to KSNT and KSNF.

The "KSN" brand had become solidified in the market and continued to be used even though KSNF was no longer a part of the Kansas State Network nor made any references to it, although the KSN stations and KSNF were reunited under the same ownership in 2017 when Nexstar acquired the Kansas State Network stations.

On August 23, 1995, Price sold KSNF and fellow NBC affiliates KJAC-TV in Beaumont, Texas, and KFDX-TV in Wichita Falls, Texas, to Wakefield, Rhode Island–based upstart USA Broadcast Group for $42 million, retaining ABC affiliate WHTM-TV in Harrisburg, Pennsylvania, as its sole television property (USA soon renamed itself to U.S. Broadcast Group after USA Network filed a trademark infringement complaint against the broadcasting company).

On January 12, 1998, Irving–based Nexstar Broadcasting Group acquired KSNF, KFDX-TV, and KBTV-TV from U.S. Broadcast Group for $64.3 million. Its digital signal on channel 46 signed on in 2003.

In 2002, it was announced KSNF and ABC affiliate KODE would merge, with building expansion planned at the KSN studios. Although some departments did in fact move to KSNF, by 2009 the process was not yet completed, leaving the Joplin market as the only one of the several Nexstar-owned duopolies to have failed to completely merge. In June 2008, KSNF began broadcasting NBC high definition programming to digital cable and satellite customers in the Joplin market. At the time, only NBC programming was provided in high definition, while local news and syndicated programs were still in standard definition, pending the upgrade of KSN's production systems and equipment to accommodate high definition content for non-network programming.

On May 8, 2009, severe thunderstorms affected the Joplin area. KSNF's tower was destroyed (falling on the studio and nearby homes) and the studio was heavily damaged. KSNF could not broadcast due to this tower collapse, so viewers could only receive NBC programming from stations airing on the fringes of the viewing area (KSNW, KJRH in Tulsa, and KYTV in Springfield, Missouri). However, several five- to ten-minute news updates were aired on fourstateshomepage.com each day until broadcasting resumed. The station returned to the air on June 17, 2009, as a subchannel of sister station KODE-TV on channel 43.2 (virtual channel 12.2). It constructed a news set inside of the KODE-TV studios where it was temporarily housed. It was made public in February 2010 that both KSNF and KODE would be moving to the remodeled KSNF studios at 1502 Cleveland, just down the road from the current KODE building.

On June 15, 2016, Nexstar announced that it has entered into an affiliation agreement with Katz Broadcasting for the Escape, Laff, Grit, and Bounce TV networks (the last one of which is owned by Bounce Media LLC, whose COO Jonathan Katz is president/CEO of Katz Broadcasting), bringing the four networks to 81 stations owned and/or operated by Nexstar, including KSNF and KODE-TV.

== Programming ==
KSNF currently broadcasts the majority of the NBC schedule, although the station currently does not clear NBC's overnight rerun and lifestyle lineups, preferring to carry some syndicated programming in the designated time period. The station does not clear the Sunday edition of Today.

=== News operation ===
KSNF presently broadcasts 23 1/2 hours of local newscasts each week (with 4 1/2 hours each weekday and 30 minutes each on Saturdays and Sundays).

While in its role as airing partial simulcasts of KSNW programming, it used the "Hello News" music package until 1990. In November 2005, a graphics and music change took place. As part of the update (and with upcoming digital changes) the "16" was removed from KSN's logo, opens, and all other images, including station vehicles. In the fall of 2010, KSNF debuted the Four State area's first and only hour-long 6 p.m. newscast. In August 2011, KSNF dropped its 5 p.m. newscast in favor of a new, hour-long 4 p.m. lifestyle program called Living Well making that the area's first and only 4 p.m. newscast. (The channel chose to air new episodes of Jeopardy! in its 5 p.m. slot as a lead-in to NBC Nightly News.) On December 19, 2012, KSNF launched its local newscasts in 1080i high definition—and for the first time since the late 90s, re-branded itself as KSN Local News dropping Your Hometown News after 15 years.

On May 1, 2023, KSNF rebranded as KSN 16 with news programming being named KSN 16 Your Local News, bringing back the channel number and adding the 16 to KSN's logo, opens, and all other images, including station vehicles. With the rebrand came a new state of the art set.

==== Notable former on-air staff ====
- T. J. Holmes – anchor/reporter

== Subchannels ==
The station's signal is multiplexed:

Subchannels of KSNF
Subchannel	Res.	Short name	Programming
16.1	1080i	KSNF-DT	NBC
16.2	480i	Laff	Laff
16.3	480i	IONMYS	Ion Mystery
16.4	480i	Ant TV	Antenna TV

On February 1, 2021, KSNF-DT4 brought Antenna TV back to the Joplin–Pittsburg market after it was dropped by KPJO-LD on June 3, 2019, in favor of Court TV.
