= List of television stations in Kansas =

This is a list of broadcast television stations that are licensed in the U.S. state of Kansas.

In addition to the television stations listed here, the following counties in Kansas are part of the Kansas City MO media market.: Anderson, Atchison, Douglas, Franklin, Johnson, Leavenworth, Linn, Miami, and Wyandotte.

== Full-power ==
- Stations are arranged by media market served and channel position.

Full-power television stations in Kansas
Media market	Station	Channel	Primary affiliation(s)	Notes	Refs
Garden City	KSWK	3	PBS	(Note: Licensed to Lakin, Kansas.) (Note: Satellite of KOOD.)	
Garden City	KBSD-DT	6	CBS	(Note: Licensed to Ensign, Kansas.) (Note: Semi-satellite of KWCH-DT.)	
Garden City	KSNG	11	NBC, Telemundo on 11.2, Ion Television on 11.3	(Note: Semi-satellite of KSNW.)	
Garden City	KUPK	13	ABC	(Note: Semi-satellite of KAKE.)	
Garden City	KDCK	21	PBS	(Note: Licensed to Dodge City, Kansas.)	
Goodland	KLBY	4	ABC	(Note: Licensed to Colby, Kansas.)	
Goodland	KBSL-DT	10	CBS		
Goodland	KWKS	19	PBS		
Hays	KSNC	2	NBC, Telemundo on 2.2, Ion Television on 2.3	(Note: Licensed to Great Bend, Kansas.)	
Hays	KBSH-DT	7	CBS		
Hays	KOOD	9	PBS		
Hays	KOCW	17	Fox, MyNetworkTV on 17.2	(Note: Licensed to Hoisington, Kansas.) (Note: Satellite of KSAS-TV.)	
Salina	KAAS-TV	17	Fox	(Note: Licensed to Salina, Kansas.)	
Topeka	KTWU	11	PBS		
Topeka	KSQA	12	Ion Plus		
Topeka	WIBW-TV	13	CBS, MeTV and MyNetworkTV on 13.2		
Topeka	KSNT	27	NBC, Fox on 27.2		
Topeka	KTKA-TV	49	ABC, The CW on 49.3		
Wichita	KSNW	3	NBC, Telemundo on 3.2, Ion Television on 3.3		
Wichita	KPTS	8	PBS	(Note: Licensed to Hutchinson, Kansas.)	
Wichita	KAKE	10	ABC		
Wichita	KWCH-DT	12	CBS		
Wichita	KSAS-TV	24	Fox, MyNetworkTV on 24.2		
Wichita	KDCU-DT	31	Univision	(Note: Licensed to Derby, Kansas.)	
Wichita	KSCW-DT	33	The CW, CBS on 12.4		
Wichita	KMTW	36	Roar		
~Joplin, MO	KOAM-TV	7	CBS, Fox on 7.2	(Note: Licensed to Pittsburg, Kansas.)	
~Joplin, MO	KFJX	14	Fox, The CW on 14.2		
~Kansas City, MO	KMCI-TV	38	Independent	(Note: Licensed to Lawrence, Kansas.)	

== Low-power ==
Low-power television stations in Kansas
Media market	Station	Channel	Primary affiliation(s)	Notes	Refs
Garden City	KDGL-LD	23	Various	(Note: Licensed to Sublette, Kansas.)	
Garden City	K29JU-D	29	[Blank]		
Salina	KSNL-LD	6	NBC		
Salina	K26PI-D	15	[Blank]	(Note: Licensed to Kansas City, Kansas.)	
Topeka	K15NC-D	3	Jewelry TV	(Note: Licensed to Manhattan, Kansas.)	
Topeka	KKSU-LD	21	Educational independent		
Topeka	WROB-LD	25	Various		
Topeka	K29OC-D	29	Jewelry TV on 29.2	(Note: Licensed to Chapman, Kansas.)	
Topeka	K32JQ-D	32	Silent		
Topeka	KQKC-LD	32	[Blank]		
Topeka	K35KX-D	35	Various		
Topeka	K36IO-D	36	Silent		
Topeka	K22OA-D	40	IBN Television		
Topeka	KTMJ-CD	43	Fox		
Wichita	KCTU-LD	5	Various		
Wichita	K29NL-D	15	HSN		
Wichita	KAGW-CD	26	Cozi TV		
Wichita	KWKD-LD	28	Daystar		
Wichita	K30RF-D	30	Various		
Wichita	KFVT-LD	34	Various		
~Joplin, MO	K16IS-D	17	Silent		
~Kansas City, MO	KCKS-LD	25	Various		
~Kansas City, MO	KGKC-LD	39	Telemundo		

== Translators ==
Television station translators in Kansas
Media market	Station	Channel	Translating	Notes	Refs
Garden City	KSAS-LP	17	KSAS-TV		
Garden City	KAAS-LP	17	KSAS-TV		
Garden City	KDDC-LD	23	KDGL-LD		
Garden City	KGCE-LD	23	KDGL-LD		
Garden City	KSWE-LD	23	KDGL-LD	(Note: Licensed to Liberal, Kansas.)	
Garden City	KDGU-LD	23	KDGL-LD	(Note: Licensed to Ulysses, Kansas.)	
Hays	KGBD-LD	30	KAKE		
Hays	K25CV-D	30	KGBD-LD		
Hays	K33NP-D	30	KGBD-LD	(Note: Licensed to Russell, Kansas.)	
Salina	KHDS-LD	51	KAKE		
Topeka	K14TN-D	14	KGKC-LD		
Wichita	KSCW-LD	33	KSCW-DT		
~Kansas City, MO	KMJC-LD	25	KCKS-LD		

== Defunct ==
- KEDD-TV Wichita (1953–1956)
- KSLN-TV Salina (1962–1963, 1964–1965)
