= Northeast Heights, Wichita, Kansas =

Northeast Heights
- Neighborhood
- Interactive map of Northeast Heights
- Coordinates: 37°44′14″N 97°17′32″W
- Country: United States
- State: Kansas
- County: Sedgwick
- City: Wichita
- Elevation: 1,339 ft (408 m)

Population (2016)
  - Total: 2,809
- ZIP code: 67219, 67220
- Area code: 316

Northeast Heights is a neighborhood in Wichita, Kansas, United States. A mixed commercial and residential area, it is located in the northeastern part of the city.

== Geography ==
Northeast Heights is located at 37°44′14″N 97°17′32″W (37.737222, -97.292222) at an elevation of 1,339 ft (408 m). It consists of the area between 37th Street in the north and 21st Street in the south and between Hillside Street in the west and Oliver Avenue in the east. The Crestview Heights neighborhood lies to the southeast, Ken-Mar and Fairmount lie to the south, Northeast Central and Power to the southwest, and Matlock Heights to the west.

The East Fork of Chisholm Creek flows windingly west through central Northeast Heights, and several of its small tributaries drain the neighborhood.

== Economy ==
The headquarters campus of Koch Industries, located on 37th Street, occupies the far northern part of the neighborhood.

== Government ==
For the purposes of representation on the Wichita City Council, Northeast Heights is in Council District 1.

For the purposes of representation in the Kansas Legislature, Northeast Heights is in the 90th district of the Kansas House of Representatives and split between the 29th and 31st districts of the Kansas Senate.

== Education ==
=== Primary and secondary education ===
Wichita Public Schools operates two schools in Northeast Heights:

- Brooks Center for STEM/Arts Magnet Middle School
- Buckner Performing Arts/Science Magnet Elementary School

=== Colleges and universities ===
The main campus of Wichita State University, a public research university, is at 21st Street and Hillside immediately south of the neighborhood.

== Media ==
KWCH-DT, the CBS television affiliate in Wichita, as well as CW affiliate KSCW-DT and Univision affiliate KDCU-DT broadcast from studios on 37th Street west of Northeast Heights.

== Parks and recreation ==
The city’s Department of Park and Recreation maintains the Chisholm Greenway, a 10-acre (4.0 ha) area on the south bank of the East Fork of Chisholm Creek.

== Culture ==
=== Points of interest ===
- Old Mission Wichita Park Cemetery

== Transportation ==
The main roads in Northeast Heights are those that form its periphery: 37th Street, which runs east-west along the north side; 21st Street, which runs east-west along the south side; Oliver, which runs north-south along the east side; and Hillside, which runs north-south along the west side. The K-96 freeway runs east-west through the north-central part of the neighborhood, accessible via interchanges at Hillside and Oliver.

Wichita Transit offers bus service to Northeast Heights on its 21 and 28 routes.

Union Pacific Railroad operates a freight rail line which runs northeast-southwest across the northern part of the neighborhood.
