= KBSD-DT =

Television station in Ensign, Kansas

Semi-satellite of KWCH-DT, Hutchinson–Wichita, Kansas
- Ensign–Dodge City–Garden City, Kansas; United States
- City: Ensign, Kansas
- Channels: Digital: 6 (VHF); Virtual: 6
- Branding: KBSD 6

Programming
- Network: Kansas Broadcasting System
- Affiliations: 6.1: CBS; for others, see § Technical information and subchannels

Ownership
- Owner: Gray Media; (Gray Television Licensee, LLC)
- Sister stations: KWCH-DT; KSCW-DT

History
- First air date: August 1, 1957
- Former call signs: KTVC (1957–1989); KBSD-TV (1989–2009)
- Former channel numbers: Analog: 6 (VHF, 1957–2009); Digital: 5 (VHF, until 2009)
- Former affiliations: ABC (1957–1961)
- Call sign meaning: Kansas Broadcasting System Dodge City

Technical information
- Licensing authority: FCC
- Facility ID: 66414
- ERP: 31 kW
- HAAT: 216.8 m (711 ft)
- Transmitter coordinates: 37°38′28″N 100°20′39″W

Links
- Public license information: Public file; LMS
- Website: www.kwch.com

KBSD-DT (channel 6) is a television station licensed to Ensign, Kansas, United States, affiliated with CBS. Owned by Gray Media, the station maintains a news bureau and advertising sales office at the Western Kansas Broadcast Center on Military Avenue in Dodge City, and its transmitter is located east of K-23 in rural northwestern Gray County.

KBSD-DT is part of the Kansas Broadcasting System (KBS), a statewide network of four full-power stations that relay programming from Wichita CBS affiliate KWCH-DT (channel 12, licensed to Hutchinson) across central and western Kansas; KBSD-DT incorporates local advertising and news inserts aimed at areas of southwestern Kansas within the Wichita–Hutchinson Plus television market, as well as portions of the Oklahoma Panhandle within the Amarillo market. KBSD-DT is also a sister station to Wichita-licensed CW affiliate KSCW-DT (channel 33).

== History ==
The station first signed on the air on August 1, 1957, as KTVC (standing for "Television Cimarron"). The station was owned by the Southwest Kansas Television Company, a joint venture of KGNO radio and the Dodge City Globe newspaper, and broadcast as an affiliate of ABC, receiving programs from KAKE-TV in Wichita. Before even going on air, the station had been the victim of a burglary in which station equipment, along with a film showing the construction of the 683-foot (208 m) tower, was stolen.

By 1958, a third Kansas station was airing ABC programming via KAKE, KAYS-TV in Hays. The three stations were branded together as the Golden K Network.

In 1961, Southwest Kansas Television Company opted to switch KTVC's network affiliation from ABC to CBS (airing programming primarily from KTVH in Hutchinson), taking effect on June 4. In making the decision, station president Wendell Elliott cited the need for freedom in scheduling its programming, which the ABC contract did not offer. The next year, KAYS changed its affiliation to CBS and purchased KWHT-TV of Goodland, Kansas, changing its call letters to KLOE-TV; the four stations formed the Kansas Broadcasting System (KBS), the CBS affiliate for central and western Kansas.

Leigh Warner bought Southwest Kansas Television Company in 1969. After Warner's death in 1985, his estate sold KTVC to Nuco TV, which owned the remainder of the KBS network; in approving the sale, the Federal Communications Commission noted that KTVC was the last television station in western Kansas not already owned by a Wichita station.

The Kansas Broadcasting System was acquired for $45 million by Smith Broadcasting in 1989; after the sale was completed, the station changed its call letters to KBSD-TV, as part of an effort that saw KWCH's three semi-satellites change their call letters to bolster the KBS network's identity. Smith sold the station to Spartanburg, South Carolina–based Spartan Communications in 1994; Spartan merged with Media General in 2000. In 2005, KWCH began operating a digital automation system from its Wichita studio facility, which handled the scheduling of advertisements and master control operations for all four KBS stations.

On April 6, 2006, Media General announced that it would sell KWCH, its satellites, and four other stations as a result of its purchase of four former NBC owned-and-operated stations (WVTM-TV in Birmingham, Alabama; WCMH-TV in Columbus, Ohio; WNCN serving Raleigh, North Carolina; and WJAR in Providence, Rhode Island). South Bend, Indiana–based Schurz Communications eventually emerged as the winner and took over on September 25, at which time Schurz formed a new subsidiary known as "Sunflower Broadcasting, Inc.", which became the licensee for its Wichita media market broadcasting properties.

Schurz announced on September 14, 2015, that it would exit broadcasting and sell its television and radio stations, including KWCH-DT and its satellites, to Gray Television for $442.5 million. Gray already owned KAKE and its satellites (including KUPK channel 13); however, it sold that station to Lockwood Broadcast Group and kept the KBS stations. The sale was completed on February 16, 2016.

== Newscasts ==
KTVC/KBSD produced a full local newscast for many years, in addition to simulcasting newscasts from KTVH/KWCH. News programming on the station in recent years has been downsized to reports contributed to KWCH's Wichita-based newscasts and web content supplied through KWCH's website.

=== Notable former on-air staff ===
- Cameron Sanders – anchor/reporter (1978–1979)

== Technical information and subchannels ==
KBSD-DT's transmitter is located east of K-23 in rural northwestern Gray County. The station's signal is multiplexed:

Subchannels of KBSD-DT
Subchannel	Res.	Short name	Programming
6.1	1080i	KBSD-DT	CBS
6.2	480i	KBSD-WX	Always On Storm Team 12
6.3	480i	Heroes	Heroes & Icons
6.4	480i	Outlaw	Outlaw

=== Analog-to-digital conversion ===
KBSD shut down its analog signal, over VHF channel 6, on June 12, 2009, the official date on which full-power television stations in the United States transitioned from analog to digital broadcasts under federal mandate. The station's digital signal relocated from its pre-transition VHF channel 5 to channel 6. The station modified its callsign to KBSD-DT two weeks later on June 25, 2009, in reflection of the transition.

The digital transition resulted in the loss of ability to listen to KBSD's audio feed over 87.7 FM; due to power outages caused by the storm and the fact that most radio stations in the area are automated during the overnight hours and on weekends, KBSD's audio rebroadcast of KWCH's severe weather coverage was one of few ways that Greensburg residents were able to receive information during and in the immediate aftermath of the EF5 tornado that struck the town on May 4, 2007. Television stations broadcasting on VHF channel 6 were audible over this frequency during the analog television era, although this is no longer possible due to the transition, even for stations that broadcast their digital signals on channel 6.
