= KBSL-DT =

Television station in Goodland, Kansas

Semi-satellite of KWCH-DT, Hutchinson–Wichita, Kansas
- Goodland–Colby, Kansas; United States
- City: Goodland, Kansas
- Channels: Digital: 10 (VHF); Virtual: 10
- Branding: KBSL 10

Programming
- Network: Kansas Broadcasting System
- Affiliations: 10.1: CBS; for others, see § Technical information and subchannels

Ownership
- Owner: Gray Media; (Gray Television Licensee, LLC)
- Sister stations: KWCH-DT; KSCW-DT

History
- First air date: September 11, 1958
- Former call signs: KWGB-TV (1958); KBLR-TV (1958–1961); KWHT-TV (1961–1962); KLOE-TV (1962–1989); KBSL-TV (1989–2009)
- Former channel numbers: Analog: 10 (VHF, 1959–2009); Digital: 14 (UHF, until 2009)
- Former affiliations: ABC (secondary, 1959–1960s)
- Call sign meaning: Kansas Broadcasting System/Goodland

Technical information
- Licensing authority: FCC
- Facility ID: 66416
- ERP: 26.5 kW
- HAAT: 299 m (981 ft)
- Transmitter coordinates: 39°28′10″N 101°33′19″W

Links
- Public license information: Public file; LMS
- Website: www.kwch.com

KBSL-DT (channel 10) is a television station licensed to Goodland, Kansas, United States, serving northwestern Kansas as an affiliate of CBS. Owned by Gray Media, the station maintains a news bureau and advertising sales office on West 31st Street in southwestern Goodland, and its transmitter is located east of K-27 in rural northeastern Sherman County.

KBSL-DT is part of the Kansas Broadcasting System (KBS), a statewide network of four full-power stations that relay programming from Wichita CBS affiliate KWCH-DT (channel 12, licensed to Hutchinson) across central and western Kansas; KBSL-DT incorporates local advertising and news inserts aimed at areas of northwestern Kansas and southwestern Nebraska within the Wichita–Hutchinson Plus television market (including Colby), as well as portions of east-central Colorado. KBSL-DT is also a sister station to Wichita-licensed CW affiliate KSCW-DT (channel 33).

Because KBSL-DT's signal lies between the Central and Mountain time zones (its city of license and transmitter facility are both on the Mountain Time Zone side of the state), CBS prime time programming in the western part of the station's viewing area airs Monday through Saturday from 6 to 9 p.m. and Sunday from 5 to 9 p.m.; however, since it operates as a satellite station of Wichita-based KWCH-DT, the station runs on a Central Time Zone schedule.

== History ==
Channel 10 in Goodland had a turbulent early history. The construction permit was awarded to James E. Blair, trading as the Goodland Broadcasting Company, on May 11, 1955, and test patterns for what was then called KWGB-TV were first broadcast in August 1958; the station installed microwave links to receive CBS and NBC network programs from Denver. The Federal Communications Commission granted KWGB-TV program test authority on September 11, 1958. Channel 10 had only come to air after Blair transferred the construction permit to Tri-State Television, which was 25 percent owned by South Dakota broadcaster Helen Duhamel. A week later, the call letters of KWGB-TV and KWGB radio (730 AM) were changed to KBLR-AM-TV. It was not until mid-October that the microwave from Denver was installed.

Citing poor health and financial difficulties, Blair sought to sell his radio and TV stations to a group of businessmen from Denver, in two transactions totaling $440,000, in May 1959. Financial difficulties continued, however, and both stations were put into bankruptcy in 1960. Bob Schmidt of Hays acquired the radio station, while channel 10 went to one of its creditors, equipment supplier Standard Electronics Corporation. Standard took over channel 10 in January 1961 and changed its call letters two months later to KWHT-TV.

Standard sold KWHT-TV to Schmidt, who also owned KAYS-TV at Hays, in 1962. To connect the Hays and Goodland television stations, a two-hop microwave system was built. The deal reunited the radio and TV stations, which became KLOE and KLOE-TV. The combination of the two stations was known very briefly as the High Plains Network, though by the fall, KAYS-TV, KLOE-TV, and KTVC all formed part of the Kansas Broadcasting System (KBS), originating at KTVH in Hutchinson.

In 1983, the Cowles family, which owned KTVH, began selling off its vast media holdings. The station was sold to the Kansas Broadcasting System Corporation, owned by Ross Beach and Schmidt; for the first time, the main KBS station was co-owned with some of its semi-satellites. (KTVC was acquired by KBS in 1988.) In 1989, the Kansas Broadcasting System Corporation was purchased by Smith Broadcasting; the sale separated KLOE-TV from its radio sister, however KLOE radio (as well as its sister radio stations) continued to operate from KBSL's facility on 31st Street. After the sale was completed, the station changed its call letters to KBSL-TV, as part of an effort that saw KWCH's three semi-satellites change their call letters to help viewers think of the stations as part of one large network. Smith sold the station to Spartanburg, South Carolina–based Spartan Communications in 1994; Spartan merged with Media General in 2000. In 2005, KWCH began operating a digital automation system from its Wichita studio facility, which handled the scheduling of advertisements and master control operations for all four KBS stations.

On April 6, 2006, Media General announced that it would sell KWCH, its satellites, and four other stations as a result of its purchase of four former NBC owned-and-operated stations (WVTM-TV in Birmingham, Alabama; WCMH-TV in Columbus, Ohio; WNCN serving Raleigh, North Carolina; and WJAR in Providence, Rhode Island). South Bend, Indiana–based Schurz Communications eventually emerged as the winner and took over on September 25, at which time Schurz formed a new subsidiary known as "Sunflower Broadcasting, Inc.", which became the licensee for its Wichita media market broadcasting properties.

Schurz announced on September 14, 2015, that it would exit broadcasting and sell its television and radio stations, including KWCH-DT and its satellites, to Gray Television for $442.5 million. Gray already owned KAKE and its satellites (including KLBY channel 4); however, it sold that station to Lockwood Broadcast Group and kept the KBS stations.

== Newscasts ==
The station produced separate local newscasts for many years; however, due to the smaller size of its studio facility, the news department was based out of a tiny studio on the west edge of the city. The station's Tri-State Report was a local news staple for many years. It was claimed that KLOE was once the smallest television station in the United States that produced its own local newscasts. In the 1970s, most of the station's operations were moved to KBSH-TV's studios in Hays, and the news department was reduced to a single reporter/photographer. Daily news stories are fed via microwave relay to KWCH's facility in Wichita, which produces local news content for KBSL.

== Technical information and subchannels ==
KBSL-DT's transmitter is located east of K-27 in rural northeastern Sherman County. The station's signal is multiplexed:

Subchannels of KBSL-DT
Subchannel	Res.	Short name	Programming
10.1	1080i	KBSL-DT	CBS
10.2	480i	KBSL-WX	Always On Storm Team 12
10.3	480i	Heroes	Heroes & Icons
10.4	480i	Outlaw	Outlaw

=== Analog-to-digital conversion ===
KBSL shut down its analog signal, over VHF channel 10, on June 12, 2009, the official date on which full-power television stations in the United States transitioned from analog to digital broadcasts under federal mandate. The station's digital signal remained on its pre-transition UHF channel 14 to VHF channel 10. Two weeks later on June 25, 2009, the station's call letters were modified to KBSL-DT to reflect the change.
