= Heroes & Icons =

American digital multicast television network

- Type: Digital broadcast television network
- Country: United States
- Broadcast area: 86.64% OTA coverage and streaming
- Headquarters: Chicago, Illinois

Programming
- Language: English
- Picture format: 720p (HDTV); 480i (SDTV on most OTA affiliates)

Ownership
- Owner: Weigel Broadcasting
- Parent: H&I National Limited Partnership
- Key people: Neal Sabin; (Vice Chairman, Weigel Broadcasting); Norman Shapiro; (President, Weigel Broadcasting)
- Sister channels: Catchy Comedy; Dabl; MeTV; MeTV+ MeTV Toons; Movies! Start TV; Story Television; WEST

History
- Launched: September 28, 2014; 11 years ago

Links
- Website: www.handitv.com

Availability

Terrestrial
- See List of affiliates

Streaming media
- Service(s): Frndly TV, FuboTV, Philo, Sling TV, DirecTV Stream

Heroes & Icons (H&I) is an American digital multicast television network owned by Weigel Broadcasting. Usually carried on the digital subchannels of its affiliated television station in most markets, the network airs classic television series from the 1950s through the 2000s, with a focus on action/adventure, westerns, crime dramas, sci-fi, and superhero programming.

H&I operates from Weigel Broadcasting's headquarters on North Halsted Street in Chicago, Illinois, and is essentially an offshoot of MeTV – the general classic TV digital networks also owned by Weigel.

== History ==
Heroes & Icons was soft-launched with limited advanced promotion on September 28, 2014, as a diginet of Weigel-owned stations WWME-CD (channel 23.2) and WCIU-TV (channel 26.4) in Chicago, and WMLW-TV (channel 49.3) in Milwaukee. Heroes & Icons was created at the request of the affiliates of Weigel's existing networks, to increase their programming options.

The network also launched in the South Bend, Indiana market, along with the major cable providers in the Chicago and Milwaukee markets (including Comcast Xfinity, RCN and Time Warner Cable) using existing carriage. Weigel opted to soft launch H&I in order to fine-tune its schedule, along with adding additional programming to the fledgling network. With the network having settled on a more stabilized schedule, Weigel moved the Heroes & Icons affiliation in Milwaukee to the third subchannel of CBS affiliate WDJT-TV (channel 58) on March 5, 2015, with This TV – which previously occupied the 58.3 space – moving to WMLW-DT3 in its place. Fox Television Stations expanded its relationship with Weigel beyond Movies!, adding it to eleven of their stations in the fourth quarter of 2015. A list of 2019 Nielsen ratings published by Variety indicated that Heroes & Icons averaged 196,000 viewers in prime time, up 18% from the 2018 average.

== Programming ==
H&I's program schedule features a mix of police procedurals, westerns, science fiction, superhero and action/adventure-themed programs. The network also carries a three-hour block of children's programming on Sunday mornings to fulfill FCC mandated E/I obligations.

Since 2016, a prominent staple in H&I's lineup is the airing of five live action classic Star Trek series called "All Star Trek" (The Original Series, Next Generation, Deep Space Nine, Voyager, and Enterprise) Sunday through Friday evenings from 8pm-1am ET.

Weekdays feature a morning western block. From noon-5 p.m. ET, a binge block branded as "The Day Shift" is featured, airing a different action/drama show every weekday. A three-hour block of CSI airs early evenings from 5-8 p.m. ET, with the All Star Trek block featured in primetime through late evenings.

Weekends feature a morning DC Comics-based superhero block, featuring Adventures of Superman, Batman, and Wonder Woman,, while a war/military themed block of programs airs Saturday evenings.

== Affiliates ==
As of July 2016, Heroes & Icons has current affiliation agreements with television stations in 63 media markets encompassing 33 states, covering 69.21% of the United States. The network is carried on the digital subchannels of television stations in most of its markets (with current exceptions including St. George, Utah O&O KCSG, which has widespread cable and satellite coverage in the Salt Lake City market and throughout Utah. The network is also carried on cable television providers through their digital tiers at the discretion of the affiliate's parent station in certain markets, and in 2020, Heroes & Icons is available nationwide on DISH Network channel 293.

In South Bend, Indiana, where Weigel Broadcasting owns three television stations (ABC affiliate WBND-LD, CW affiliate WCWW-LD and MyNetworkTV affiliate WMYS-LD), the network is instead carried by former Fox affiliate WSJV through an agreement with that station's owner Gray Television (it took over the main signal on October 1, 2016, as that station was under consideration to sell its spectrum in that year's spectrum auction, though it ultimately remained on the air). The network added additional stations by early December 2014, which in addition to WSJV, included KCSG in the Salt Lake City market (a station Weigel eventually purchased in 2017) and a digital subchannel of Des Moines CBS affiliate KCCI.

On September 18, 2015, Weigel signed an affiliation agreement with Fox Television Stations to carry the network on subchannels of the group's Fox and MyNetworkTV owned-and-operated stations in eleven markets, including New York City, Los Angeles, Dallas, San Francisco, and Washington, D.C., beginning in the fourth quarter of 2015. Once all of the stations involved in the agreement affiliated with the network, H&I will expand its coverage to 52% of all U.S. households and availability in eight of the 10 largest Nielsen markets.

In October 2020, Heroes & Icons was made available on Sling TV. On April 19, 2022, Heroes & Icons began airing on the Frndly TV live streaming service. On August 9, 2022, Heroes & Icons became available on Philo.

On December 28, 2023, Heroes & Icons was made available nationwide also on DirecTV.

On June 26, 2025, Fubo announced a multi-year agreement with Weigel Broadcasting to distribute Heroes & Icons, along with several other Weigel channels.

Current affiliates for Heroes & Icons
Media market	State/Dist./Terr.	Station	Channel
Anniston–Gadsden–Birmingham	Alabama	WGWW	40.1
Huntsville–Decatur	Alabama	WAAY-TV	31.5
Mobile	Alabama	WFBD	48.3
Montgomery	Alabama	WALE-LD	17.6
Troy	Alabama	WIYC	43.3
Tuscaloosa	Alabama	WSES	33.1
Anchorage	Alaska	KTUU-TV	2.2
Anchorage	Alaska	KYES-LD	2.12
Juneau–Douglas	Alaska	KATH-LD	2.2
Phoenix	Arizona	KSAZ-TV	10.3
Kingman	Arizona	KMOH-TV	6.2
Tucson	Arizona	KTTU-TV	18.5
Camden	Arkansas	KMYA-DT	49.3
Fayetteville	Arkansas	KFLU-LD	20.6
Sheridan–Little Rock	Arkansas	KMYA-LD	49.3
Bakersfield	California	KNXT-LD	53.4
Chico–Redding	California	KNVN	24.6
Los Angeles	California	KCOP-TV	13.4
Los Angeles	California	KAZA-TV	54.5
Fresno	California	KAIL	7.3
Monterey	California	KMBY-LD	27.2
Oroville	California	K31ND-D	24.8
Palo Alto–San Francisco–Oakland–San Jose	California	KTLN-TV	68.1
Stockton–Sacramento–Modesto	California	KQCA	58.2
Colorado Springs–Pueblo	Colorado	KRDO-TV	13.7
Denver	Colorado	KTVD	20.2
Glenwood Springs	Colorado	KREG-TV	3.2
Grand Junction	Colorado	KLML	20.2
Grand Junction	Colorado	KLML-LD	20.2
Hartford–New Haven	Connecticut	WHCT-LD	35.2
Washington	District of Columbia	WDCA	20.3
Fort Myers	Florida	WBBH-TV	20.2
Jacksonville	Florida	WFOX-TV	30.3
Miami–Fort Lauderdale	Florida	WPLG	10.3
Ocala–Gainesville	Florida	WKMG-LD	65.3
Orlando	Florida	WRBW	65.3
Panama City	Florida	WECP-LD	21.4
Tallahassee	Florida	WTLH	49.1
Tampa–St. Petersburg	Florida	WTVT	13.4
West Palm Beach–Boca Raton–Fort Pierce	Florida	WFLX	29.4
Atlanta	Georgia	WGTA	32.2
Atlanta	Georgia	WUPA	69.7
Augusta	Georgia	WAGT-CD	26.5
Baxley–Savannah	Georgia	WSCG	34.7
Columbus	Georgia	WXTX	54.5
Cordele–Albany	Georgia	WSST-TV	55.3
Cordele–Albany	Georgia	WSST-LD	55.3
Macon	Georgia	WPGA-TV	58.2
Hilo	Hawaii	KHVO	4.5
Honolulu	Hawaii	KITV	4.5
Wailuku	Hawaii	KMAU	4.5
Boise	Idaho	KRID-LD	22.3
Idaho Falls	Idaho	KBAX-LD	27.2
Pocatello–Idaho Falls	Idaho	KVUI	31.3
Chicago	Illinois	WWME-CD	23.2
Chicago	Illinois	WCIU-TV	26.4
Harrisburg–Marion–Carbondale	Illinois	WSIL-TV	3.2
Rockford	Illinois	WFBN-LD	35.1
Evansville	Indiana	WZDS-LD	5.1
South Bend	Indiana	WMYS-LD	69.1
Indianapolis	Indiana	WJSJ-CD	51.4
Cedar Rapids	Iowa	KWWL	7.2
Davenport–Bettendorf	Iowa	KWQC-TV	6.4
Des Moines	Iowa	KCCI	8.3
Ensign–Dodge City–Garden City	Kansas	KBSD-DT	6.3
Goodland–Colby	Kansas	KBSL-DT	10.3
Hays–Great Bend	Kansas	KBSH-DT	7.3
Hutchinson–Wichita	Kansas	KWCH-DT	12.3
Topeka	Kansas	WIBW-TV	13.3
Beattyvile–Lexington	Kentucky	WLJC-TV	65.7
Bowling Green	Kentucky	WBKO	13.6
Hazard	Kentucky	WYMT-TV	57.2
Louisville	Kentucky	WBNA	21.6
Alexandria	Louisiana	KBCA	41.1
Lafayette	Louisiana	KDCG-CD	22.1
Lafayette	Louisiana	KLWB	50.3
Monroe	Louisiana	KMLU	11.2
New Orleans	Louisiana	WUPL	54.3
Bangor–Dedham	Maine	WBGR-LD	18.2
Portland	Maine	WPXT	51.2
Baltimore	Maryland	WMJF-CD	39.6
Salisbury	Maryland	WGDV-LD	32.3
Boston	Massachusetts	WSBK-TV	38.2
Detroit	Michigan	WDIV-TV	4.2
Flint–Saginaw–Bay City–Midland	Michigan	WJRT-TV	12.5
Kalamazoo–Battle Creek–Grand Rapids	Michigan	WLLA	64.3
Marquette	Michigan	WZMQ	19.3
Onodaga–Lansing–Jackson	Michigan	WILX-TV	10.3
Chisholm–Hibbing	Minnesota	KRII	11.3
Duluth	Minnesota	KDLH	3.7
Minneapolis–Saint Paul	Minnesota	KSTP-TV	5.7
Rochester	Minnesota	KXLT-TV	47.3
Meridian	Mississippi	WOOK-LD	15.2
Vicksburg–Jackson	Mississippi	WLOO	35.2
Joplin	Missouri	KOAM-TV	7.4
Kansas City	Missouri	KSMO-TV	62.2
Poplar Bluff	Missouri	KPOB-TV	15.2
St. Louis	Missouri	KNLC	24.3
Grand Island–Hastings–Kearney	Nebraska	KGIN	11.4
Lincoln	Nebraska	KOLN	10.4
Omaha	Nebraska	WOWT	6.3
Ely	Nevada	KKEL	27.4
Las Vegas	Nevada	KHSV	21.2
Albuquerque–Santa Fe	New Mexico	KOB	4.2
Farmington	New Mexico	KOBF	12.2
Roswell–Carlsbad	New Mexico	KOBR	8.2
Albany	New York	WNYA	51.4
Buffalo	New York	WBBZ-TV	67.2
New York City	New York	WWOR-TV	9.4
Oneida	New York	WTKO-CD	13.3
Rochester	New York	WHEC-TV	10.5
Syracuse	New York	WTVU-CD	22.3
Utica	New York	WWDG-CD	12.3
Charlotte	North Carolina	WCCB	18.5
Raleigh–Durham–Fayetteville	North Carolina	WRAZ	50.4
Smithfield	North Carolina	WARZ-LD	21.3
Washington–Greenville–New Bern–Jacksonville	North Carolina	WITN-TV	7.5
Wilmington	North Carolina	WILM-LD	10.3
Wilmington	North Carolina	WILT-LD	24.3
Bismarck–Mandan	North Dakota	KNDB	24.1
Minot	North Dakota	KNDM	26.1
Fargo	North Dakota	KXJB-LD	30.3
Cincinnati	Ohio	WXIX-TV	19.2
Cleveland	Ohio	WBNX-TV	55.4
Columbus	Ohio	WCSN-LD	32.2
Oklahoma City	Oklahoma	KUOK-CD	36.5
Tulsa	Oklahoma	KMYT-TV	41.4
Woodward	Oklahoma	KUOK	35.5
Astoria–Portland	Oregon	KPWT-LD	3.1
Eugene	Oregon	KEZI	9.4
Medford	Oregon	KFBI-LD	48.1
Erie	Pennsylvania	WSEE-TV	35.4
Harrisburg	Pennsylvania	WCZS-LD	35.5
Johnstown	Pennsylvania	WTOO-CD	50.1
Philadelphia	Pennsylvania	WDPN-TV	2.4
Pittsburgh	Pennsylvania	WPKD-TV	19.2
Añasco	Puerto Rico	W34FK-D	33.1
Charleston	South Carolina	WGWG	4.5
Columbia	South Carolina	WOLO-TV	25.5
Greenville–Spartanburg	South Carolina	WDKT-LD	31.5
Myrtle Beach–Florence	South Carolina	WFXB	43.5
Rapid City	South Dakota	KHME	23.2
Rapid City	South Dakota	KQME	5.2
Jackson	Tennessee	WNBJ-LD	39.3
Kingsport–Johnson City–Bristol	Tennessee	WAPK-CD	36.4
Kingsport–Johnson City–Bristol	Tennessee	WKIN-CD	36.4
Kingsport–Johnson City–Bristol	Tennessee	WKPZ-CD	36.4
Knoxville	Tennessee	WBXX-TV	20.3
Memphis	Tennessee	WHBQ-TV	13.2
Nashville	Tennessee	WJFB	44.2
Amarillo	Texas	KEYU	31.2
Austin	Texas	KVAT-LD	17.4
Beaumont	Texas	KUIL-LD	12.13
Belton–Killeen–Temple–Waco	Texas	KNCT	46.5
Corpus Christi	Texas	KQSY-LD	30.2
Dallas–Fort Worth	Texas	KDFW	4.3
Houston	Texas	KPRC-TV	2.3
Lubbock	Texas	KLBB-LD	48.2
Odessa	Texas	KOSA-TV	7.4
Snyder	Texas	KABI-LD	42.1
San Antonio	Texas	KSAT-TV	12.4
Tyler	Texas	KDKJ-LD	27.5
Victoria	Texas	KVCT	19.4
Cedar City–St. George	Utah	KCSG	8.4
Ogden–Salt Lake City	Utah	KCSG-LD	8.4
Burlington	Vermont	WCAX-TV	3.3
Norfolk–Virginia Beach	Virginia	WVEC	13.7
Roanoke–Lynchburg	Virginia	WDBJ	7.3
Bellingham	Washington	KVOS-TV	12.8
Kennewick–Pasco–Richland	Washington	KVEW	42.3
Seattle	Washington	KFFV	44.3
Spokane	Washington	KXLY-TV	4.3
Yakima	Washington	KAPP	35.3
Charleston–Huntington	West Virginia	WQCW	30.2
Weston–Clarksburg–Fairmont	West Virginia	WDTV	5.3
Eau Claire	Wisconsin	WECX-LD	14.2
Green Bay	Wisconsin	WBAY-TV	2.4
Madison	Wisconsin	WIFS	57.8
Milwaukee	Wisconsin	WMLW-TV	49.3
Wausau	Wisconsin	WZAW-LD	33.4
Casper	Wyoming	KCWY-DT	13.4
Casper	Wyoming	KCBZ-LD	13.4
Casper	Wyoming	K16JI-D	13.4
