= Susan Peters (TV anchor) =

American news anchor

Susan Peters (born September 27, 1956) is a former news anchor. She worked for KAKE, the ABC affiliate in Wichita, Kansas from 1995 to 2016. She has won regional Emmy awards for her reporting in both California and Kansas.

After graduating from Western Illinois University with a B.A. in Communications, she started as a reporter at WRAU-TV in Peoria, Illinois in 1978. She became an anchor and reporter at KWCH-DT in August 1983. In 1991, she moved to KFMB-TV in San Diego. She returned to Wichita in 1995 to work at KAKE until May 25, 2016.

Peters returned to the air in late 2017, co-hosting Hatteberg's People on KPTS with former KAKE co-anchor Larry Hatteberg.

In January 2007, the Wikipedia article on Peters was featured on the national public radio program Weekend America. The discussion revolved around whether the article on Wikipedia should be deleted based upon Wikipedia's notability guidelines. The result of the AfD in question was "keep", and Weekend America announced it as such.

An MSNBC.com investigation into partisan journalists/newspersons who donate to political parties and causes, Peters was found to have donated to a liberal organization with ties to the Democratic party.
