= Spartan Communications =

American media company (1940–2000)

Spartan Communications, Inc.
- Formerly: Spartanburg Advertising Company; Spartan Radiocasting
- Company type: Private
- Industry: Broadcast television
- Founded: 1940
- Founder: Walter J. Brown
- Defunct: 2000
- Fate: Acquired by Media General
- Successor: Media General; Nexstar Media Group
- Headquarters: Spartanburg, South Carolina, United States
- Products: Television stations

Spartan Communications, Inc. was a company based in Spartanburg, South Carolina, that owned WSPA-TV as the city's flagship station from 1956 to 2000 when Spartan merged with Media General of Richmond, VA. In 1984, Spartan bought WBTW and KIMT-TV from the Shotts family.

== History ==
In March 2000, WSPA-TV and eleven other stations were sold to Media General for US$605 million.

== Former stations ==
- Stations are arranged in alphabetical order by state and city of license.
- Two boldface asterisks appearing following a station's call letters (**) indicate a station built and signed on by Spartan Communications.

Stations owned by Spartan Communications
Media market	State	Station	Purchased	Sold	Notes
Panama City	Florida	WMBB	1990	2000	
Augusta	Georgia	WJBF	1992	2000	
Columbus	Georgia	WRBL	1995	2000	
Toccoa	Georgia	WNEG-TV	1995	2000	
Mason City	Iowa	KIMT	1984	2000	
Ensign–Dodge City	Kansas	KBSD-TV	1994	2000	(Note: Satellite of KWCH-TV.)
Goodland	Kansas	KBSL-TV	1994	2000	
Hays	Kansas	KBSH-TV	1994	2000	
Hutchinson–Wichita	Kansas	KWCH-TV	1994	2000	
Greenville–Spartanburg	South Carolina	WSPA-TV **	1956	2000	
Florence–Myrtle Beach	South Carolina	WBTW	1984	2000	
