= Benedek Broadcasting =

American television broadcasting company (1970s–2002)

Benedek Broadcasting was a television broadcasting company that owned and operated 22 network-affiliated television stations throughout the United States, all affiliated with major television networks, serving mainly small and medium-size markets. The company was founded in the late 1970s by A. Richard Benedek but grew in the 1990s with buyouts of Brisette Broadcasting and Stauffer Communications. The company was based in Hoffman Estates, Illinois. Throughout its existence, namesake Benedek served as chairman and chief executive officer.

Benedek also owned U.S. Virgin Islands station WBNB-TV starting in 1986, but was knocked off the air by Hurricane Hugo in 1989. Its facilities were so badly damaged that Benedek, with no financial resources to rebuild, essentially chose to abandon the station, and its license was deleted in 1995.

Benedek Broadcasting filed for Chapter 11 bankruptcy in 2002, and sold off its 22 stations to different owners, many of them to Gray Television with the balance (all small or struggling stations) going to Chelsey Broadcasting. Gray had intended to purchase the Benedek stations in 2002, but spin-off some of them to Chelsey, leaving Gray with the larger stations. Barrington Broadcasting which began operations in 2004 with former Benedek president and COO K. James Yager as CEO, occupied what had been Benedek's headquarters and purchased two of the former Benedek stations which had been purchased by Chelsey, until it was acquired by Sinclair Broadcast Group in 2013.

Benedek Broadcasting had also operated Benedek Interactive Media, an 'Internet newsroom' that extended web-only coverage and editorial capabilities to its stations.

== Former stations ==
- Stations are arranged in alphabetical order by state and city of license.

Stations owned by Benedek Broadcasting
Media market	State/Territory	Station	Purchased	Sold	Notes
Dothan	Alabama	WTVY	1995	2002	
Santa Barbara	California	KCOY-TV	1996	1999	
Colorado Springs–Pueblo	Colorado	KKTV	1999	2002	
Peoria	Illinois	WHOI	1996	2002	
Freeport–Rockford	Illinois	WIFR	1986	2002	
Colby	Kansas	KLBY	2000	2002	(Note: Satellite of KAKE-TV.)
Garden City	Kansas	KUPK	2000	2002	
Topeka	Kansas	WIBW-TV	1996	2002	
Wichita	Kansas	KAKE-TV	2000	2002	
Bowling Green	Kentucky	WBKO	1983	2002	
Springfield	Massachusetts	WWLP	1996	2000	
Lansing	Michigan	WILX-TV	1996	2002	
Duluth	Minnesota	KDLH	1985	2002	
Meridian	Mississippi	WTOK-TV	1988	2002	
Columbia–Jefferson City	Missouri	KMIZ	1996	2002	
Hannibal	Missouri	KHQA-TV	1986	2002	
Omaha	Nebraska	WOWT-TV	1999	2002	
Youngstown	Ohio	WYTV	1985	2002	
Odessa–Midland	Texas	KOSA-TV	1996	2000	
Wichita Falls	Texas	KAUZ-TV	1996	2002	
Harrisonburg	Virginia	WHSV-TV	1986	2002	
Parkersburg	West Virginia	WTAP-TV	1979	2002	
Wheeling	West Virginia	WTRF-TV	1996	2002	
Madison	Wisconsin	WMTV	1996	2002	
Wausau	Wisconsin	WSAW-TV	1996	2002	
Casper	Wyoming	KGWC-TV	1996	2002	(Note: Semi-satellite of KGWN-TV.)
Cheyenne	Wyoming	KGWN-TV	1996	2002	
Charlotte Amalie	U.S. Virgin Islands	WBNB-TV	1986	1995	(Note: Ceased operations in 1989 following Hurricane Hugo; license was cancelled in 1995.)
