= KSLN-TV =

Television station in Salina, Kansas (1962–1965)

- Salina, Kansas; United States
- Channels: Analog: 34 (UHF)

Programming
- Affiliations: NBC (1962–1963); ABC (1962–1965)

Ownership
- Owner: Mid-America Broadcasting Company

History
- First air date: January 2, 1962
- Last air date: November 1, 1965
- Call sign meaning: "Salina"

Technical information
- ERP: 0.724 kW
- HAAT: 53 m (175 ft)
- Transmitter coordinates: 38°50′26″N 97°36′35″W

KSLN-TV (channel 34) was a television station in Salina, Kansas, United States, which broadcast in two separate incarnations on the same license from 1962 to 1965. The station was the ABC affiliate in Salina throughout its existence, but operating on a UHF channel and with extremely low-power facilities for a full-service TV station, it could not compete effectively with the VHF television stations received in Salina. The station closed in 1965 and began a quest to move a VHF allocation to Salina, which ended in failure when the Federal Communications Commission ruled the proposal technically deficient in 1968.

== History ==
=== Prairie States era ===
KSLN-TV was built by Prairie States Broadcasting Company, a business of Mel and Tom Gleason of York, Nebraska, which owned two stations in that state. The station's studios and transmitter were located on the 10th floor of the United Building in downtown Salina. Getting it there was an arduous effort in which the transmitter was hoisted under the building's elevator, which then had to be sent all the way to the top and hand-cranked to the elevator headhouse to bring the equipment to the 10th floor; the transmitter also had to be twisted to fit through the elevator shaft.

Even though equipment was being installed as early as November 1960, KSLN-TV did not sign on until January 2, 1962, with a dual affiliation with ABC and NBC.

=== Sale and new ownership ===
On May 17, 1963, Prairie States took KSLN-TV off the air and announced that it would sell channel 34 to a new buyer: the Mid-America Broadcasting Company, which also owned the cable television system in Salina. The month before, Prairie States had filed to sell channel 34 to Mid-America for $43,000. An objector soon appeared: the Wichita Television Corporation, owner of the Kansas State Network (KSN) and applicant for a TV translator of the KSN station at Great Bend, KCKT, which would serve Salina. Wichita Television claimed that the sale of KSLN to Salina's cable system created a conflict of interest. The Federal Communications Commission (FCC) approved the sale in February 1964, saying that the CATV system was small—with just 122 subscribers—and that Prairie States had been forced to pull the plug on channel 34 due to financial difficulties. The general manager of Mid-America announced that the station would make technical improvements in new equipment and modernized studios. KSN maintained its filing for the KCKT translator on channel 74 and took out a full-page ad in the Salina Journal congratulating Mid-America on its purchase of KSLN-TV—the very purchase to which it had objected—and touting its attempts to build the translator to give Salina reliable NBC network service. KSLN-TV returned to air August 1, 1964, once more as Salina's ABC affiliate. Channel 34 complemented the ABC lineup with local newscasts and an afternoon children's show known as Bar 34.

=== In pursuit of VHF ===
However, Mid-America was not able to profitably run KSLN-TV, just as Prairie States had failed. In late October 1965, the station announced it would ask for authority to "temporarily" cease operations effective November 1 and begin a fight to get a VHF television channel allocated to Salina; channel 34's management said that "every possible effort" would be made to reopen KSLN-TV as a VHF station.

The KSLN bid to bring VHF television to Salina—whose assigned channels were 18, 34, and 44—would have changed the educational assignment of channel 9 at Lincoln Center to channel 6 and substituted commercial channel 9 for channel 34 in Salina. The Lincoln Center assignment would necessitate a waiver of station spacing rules. In its arguments, Mid-America stated that the conversion rate of VHF sets to tune its channel 34 station was low, and that KSLN-TV had ceased operations twice for financial reasons. Mid-America's own studies found that the conversion rate in Salina was 20 to 30 percent; a 1966 American Research Bureau study commissioned by KSN pegged the figure at 36 percent inside the city and just 8 percent outside of it. It further argued that KSLN-TV could not compete with advertising dollars with the VHF stations in town, which included the network stations in Wichita as well as KCKT and ABC affiliate KHTL-TV of Superior, Nebraska, and that the KSN translator (K74CN) had contributed to channel 34's financial woes.

However, Mid-America's filing presented station spacing challenges. It proposed that the channel 6 allocation be able to locate its transmitter with KSLN-TV in Salina. However, channel 6 there would be short spaced by 33 miles (53 km) to KTVC at Ensign, Kansas. While local business groups in Salina supported the position, other broadcasters, including the channel 6 stations in Tulsa, Oklahoma, and Omaha, Nebraska, filed oppositions, as did KSN. The other broadcasters claimed that Mid-America had not done enough to promote UHF television in Salina, failing to do any promotion whatsoever, and that its minimal facilities made it a "glorified translator".

The FCC, in its decision on January 10, 1968, denied the petition from Mid-America, saying that Salina was still an area for potential development of UHF, that it had inadequate VHF service, that Mid-America would be better served trying to increase KSLN-TV's power, and that the changing of the educational assignment to channel 6 would create a "degraded and limiting" facility that could not provide appropriate service. Some of channel 34's equipment, still owned by the Salina cable system, was loaned to help the Kansas State University closed-circuit TV system resume operations after a fire gutted the Nichols Gym where the equipment was located.

== Later uses of channel 34 at Salina ==
The channel 34 assignment would be occupied in 1971 by translator station K34AA, which relocated from channel 78 (as K78CV). The move marked the return of ABC programming to channel 34, as K34AA was a translator for KAKE-TV of Wichita. K34AA moved to channel 22 as K22CP in 1989 and remains a repeater for KAKE as KHDS-LD.

A construction permit for channel 34 was issued in 1984 for a station that would have been known as KHCT; this station, which never signed on, would have been an independent.
