= ABC4 =

ABC4 may refer to:

- ABC 4 (American Broadcasting Company affiliates)
- the former on-air branding for Australian ABC Kids
