= KMTW =

Television station in Hutchinson, Kansas

ATSC 3.0 station
- Hutchinson–Wichita, Kansas; United States
- City: Hutchinson, Kansas
- Channels: Digital: 35 (UHF); Virtual: 36

Programming
- Affiliations: 36.1: Roar; for others, see § Subchannels

Ownership
- Owner: Mercury Broadcasting Company, Inc.
- Operator: Sinclair Broadcast Group via LMA
- Sister stations: KSAS-TV

History
- Founded: June 27, 1997
- First air date: January 5, 2001
- Former call signs: KAWJ (1997–1998); KSCC (1998–2006)
- Former channel numbers: Analog: 36 (UHF, 2001–2009)
- Former affiliations: UPN (2001–2006); MyNetworkTV (2006–2021); Dabl (2021–2025)
- Call sign meaning: Kansas MyNetworkTV Wichita (reflecting former status as a MyNetworkTV affiliate)

Technical information
- Licensing authority: FCC
- Facility ID: 77063
- ERP: 1,000 kW
- HAAT: 310 m (1,017 ft)
- Transmitter coordinates: 37°56′21.8″N 97°30′42.7″W

Links
- Public license information: Public file; LMS

KMTW (channel 36) is a television station licensed to Hutchinson, Kansas, United States, serving the Wichita area with programming from the digital multicast network Roar. It is owned by the Mercury Broadcasting Company, which maintains a local marketing agreement (LMA) with Sinclair Broadcast Group, owner of dual Fox/MyNetworkTV affiliate KSAS-TV (channel 24), for the provision of certain services. The two stations share studios on North West Street in northwestern Wichita; KMTW's transmitter is located in rural southwestern Harvey County (on the town limits of Halstead).

== History ==
On June 27, 1997, Clear Channel Communications (owner of Fox affiliate KSAS-TV (channel 24)) entered into a local marketing agreement with Goddard-based Three Feathers Communications, Inc. to form a new television station in Hutchinson, Kansas. Initially bearing the name KAWJ, the construction permit took the KSCC ("Kansas Clear Channel") call letters on October 9, 1998.

On July 30, 1999, Three Feathers filed an application to sell the license of KSCC to Viacom's Paramount Stations Group, with the application being granted by the Federal Communications Commission (FCC) on October 1 the same year. The station first signed on the air on January 5, 2001 (the station first appeared on Cox Cable starting in August 2000) affiliating with UPN as an owned-and-operated station, a rarity for a market of Wichita's size. However, just prior to the station's sign-on, its license assets were sold to San Antonio–based Mercury Broadcasting Company. In June 2001, Mercury Broadcasting would take over ownership of KSCC. Prior to the station's sign-on, UPN programming was seen on a secondary basis on sister station KSAS-TV. In 2003, Clear Channel attempted to buy the station outright, but was denied a "failing station" waiver by the FCC. This special approval for the sale was necessary because the Wichita–Hutchinson designated market area has only seven "unique" full-power television stations. The full-power stations operating outside the immediate metropolitan area all operate as satellites of each of Wichita's four major network affiliates (KSNW (channel 3), KAKE (channel 10), KWCH-TV (channel 12) and KSAS-TV), and the FCC considers the parent and all of its satellites together as one station. That number of unique full-power stations is normally not enough to legally support a duopoly and Clear Channel did not attempt to find a buyer for KSCC that did not need a "failing station" waiver.

On January 24, 2006, the Warner Bros. unit of Time Warner and CBS Corporation announced that the two companies would shut down The WB and UPN and combine the networks' respective programming to create a new network called The CW. On February 22, 2006, News Corporation announced the launch of a programming service called MyNetworkTV, which would be operated by Fox Television Stations and its syndication division Twentieth Television. MyNetworkTV was created to compete against The CW as well as to give UPN and WB stations that would not become CW affiliates another option besides converting to independent stations. KSCC was announced as Wichita's MyNetworkTV charter affiliate on June 15, and subsequently changed its callsign to KMTW on August 1. The station affiliated with MyNetworkTV when it launched on September 5; the area's WB affiliate KWCV (channel 33, now KSCW-DT) joined The CW when it launched on September 18.

On April 20, 2007, Clear Channel entered into an agreement to sell its television stations (including KSAS and its LMA with KMTW) to Newport Television, a holding company controlled by private equity firm Providence Equity Partners; the sale was finalized on March 14, 2008. On July 19, 2012, Newport Television announced the sale of KSAS-TV, along with the acquisition of the station's LMA with KMTW, to the Sinclair Broadcast Group as part of a group deal worth an estimated $1 billion involving the sale of 22 stations to Sinclair, the Nexstar Broadcasting Group and Cox Media Group. Included in the acquisition of the LMA was an option for Sinclair to acquire KMTW outright from Mercury Broadcasting should the FCC relax its media ownership rules to allow a duopoly between one of the four highest-rated stations and a station rated below the top four in markets with fewer than nine full-power commercial stations with or without a waiver. The KSAS purchase and the transaction of the LMA was completed on December 3.

On July 28, 2021, the FCC issued a Forfeiture Order stemming from a lawsuit against KMTW owner Mercury Broadcasting Company. The lawsuit, filed by AT&T, alleged that Mercury failed to negotiate for retransmission consent in good faith for KMTW. Owners of other Sinclair-managed stations, such as Deerfield Media, were also named in the lawsuit. Mercury was initially ordered to pay a fine of $512,228. This was reduced to $30,000 after Mercury argued financial hardship would prevent payment of the original fine issued.

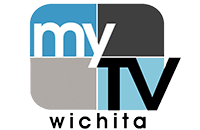
Previous logo as a MyNetworkTV affiliate used from 2006 until 2021.

On September 20, 2021, after 15 years of MyNetworkTV having a separate affiliated station in Wichita, MyTV Wichita programming moved to KSAS-TV 24.2, which formerly aired programming from Sinclair's Internet-sourced network, TBD. The move came within two months of the FCC fine issued against owner Mercury Broadcasting. TBD moved to KMTW 36.4, which formerly aired Dabl programming since the network's launch on September 9, 2019, and Dabl moved to 36.1.

In August 2025, the station dropped Dabl and flipped to Roar.

== Newscasts ==
Until January 31, 2011, KMTW aired a rebroadcast of KSAS-TV's half-hour 9 p.m. newscast, which was produced by CBS affiliate KWCH-DT through a news share agreement, nightly at 12 a.m. The outsourcing arrangement expired on December 31, 2011, with NBC affiliate KSNW re-assuming production responsibilities for the KSAS newscasts at that time (KSNW had previously produced KSAS-TV's first prime time newscast attempt from 1997 to 1999). ABC affiliate KAKE has since took over KSAS-TV's half-hour 9 p.m. newscast on January 1, 2020, after KSNW ended its partnership.

== Technical information ==
=== Subchannels ===
The station's ATSC 1.0 channels are carried on the multiplexed digital signals of other Wichita television stations:

Subchannels provided by KMTW (ATSC 1.0)
Subchannel	Res.	Short name	Programming	ATSC 1.0 host
36.1	480i	KMTW	Roar	KSAS-TV
36.2	480i	TheNest	The Nest	KSAS-TV
36.3	480i	Charge!	Charge!	KSNW
36.4	480i	TCN	True Crime Network	KAKE

On June 23, 2014, the Sinclair Broadcast Group entered into an affiliation agreement with Sony Pictures Television Networks to carry the classic movie service GetTV on 33 of the company's stations, including KMTW. The network was added on a newly created third digital subchannel on July 5, 2014. After the launch of Sinclair's action-oriented network Charge!, getTV moved to 36.2, replacing ZUUS Country (now known as The Country Network). However, getTV since moved to KFVT-LD, and the channel was subsequently replaced with Sinclair's terrestrial sports network, Stadium.

=== Analog-to-digital conversion ===
KMTW shut down its analog signal, over UHF channel 36, on February 17, 2009, the original target date on which full-power television stations in the United States were to transition from analog to digital broadcasts under federal mandate (which was later pushed back to June 12, 2009). The station's digital signal remained on its pre-transition UHF channel 35, using virtual channel 36.

=== ATSC 3.0 lighthouse service ===
Subchannels of KMTW (ATSC 3.0)
Subchannel	Res.	Short name	Programming
3.1	1080p	KSNW	NBC (KSNW)
10.1	720p	KAKE	ABC (KAKE)
24.1	720p	KSAS	Fox (KSAS-TV)
36.1	720p	KMTW	Roar
