= ABC 4 (American Broadcasting Company affiliates) =

ABC 4 may refer to:

== Current ==
- KITV in Honolulu, Hawaii
- KLBY in Colby, Kansas
  - Semi-satellite of KAKE in Wichita, Kansas
- KOMO-TV in Seattle, Washington
- KPRY-TV in Pierre, South Dakota
  - Re-broadcast of KOTA-TV in Rapid City, South Dakota
- KTVX in Salt Lake City, Utah, which operates the abc4.com website
- KXLY-TV in Spokane, Washington
- WCIV-DT2, Charleston, South Carolina (branded as ABC 4 Charleston, broadcasts on channel 36.2)
- WMOW-DT2 in Crandon, Wisconsin
- WOAY-TV in Oak Hill, West Virginia
- WOTV in Battle Creek, Michigan (cable channel; broadcasts on channel 41)
- WTAE-TV in Pittsburgh, Pennsylvania

== Former ==
- KHMT in Billings, Montana (1987–1994)
- WCIV (now WGWG) in Charleston, South Carolina (1996–2014)
