= KSLN =

KSLN may refer to:

- KSLN-LP, a low-power radio station (95.9 FM) licensed to serve Sullivan, Missouri, United States
- KSLN-TV, a television station (channel 34) formerly licensed to serve Salina, Kansas, United States
- Salina Regional Airport (ICAO code KSLN)
