= ABC 13 =

ABC 13 may refer to one of the following television stations in the United States:

== Current ==
- KHGI-TV in Kearney, Nebraska
- KRDO-TV in Colorado Springs, Colorado
- KTNV-TV in Las Vegas, Nevada
- KTRK-TV in Houston, Texas, which operates the abc13.com website and is owned and operated by the ABC network
- KUPK in Dodge City, Kansas (Re-broadcasts KAKE in Wichita, Kansas)
- KYUR in Anchorage, Alaska
- WBKO in Bowling Green, Kentucky
- WHAM-TV in Rochester, New York
- WIRT-DT in Hibbing, Minnesota (Re-broadcasts WDIO-DT in Duluth, Minnesota)
- WLOS in Asheville, North Carolina
- WLOX in Biloxi, Mississippi
- WMBB in Panama City, Florida
- WSET-TV in Lynchburg, Virginia
- WTVG in Toledo, Ohio
- WVEC in Hampton–Norfolk, Virginia
- WZZM in Grand Rapids, Michigan

== Former ==
- KHVO in Hilo, Hawaii (1960–2009):
  - Was a satellite station of KITV in Honolulu, Hawaii
- KOVR in Sacramento, California (1957–1995)
- KSWT (now KYMA-DT) in Yuma, Arizona (1991–1994)
- KVIA-TV in El Paso, Texas (1956–1981)
- WHBQ-TV in Memphis, Tennessee (1953–1995)
- WJZ-TV in Baltimore, Maryland (1948–1995)
- WOWK-TV in Huntington, West Virginia (1955–1958 and again from 1962–1986)
- WORO-DT in San Juan, Puerto Rico (1984–1989)
- WREX-TV in Rockford, Illinois (1965–1995)
- WTHR in Indianapolis, Indiana (1957–1979)
- WNYT (TV) in Albany, New York (1956–1977)
- WVUE-DT in New Orleans, Louisiana (1959–1962)
