= KEDD (TV) =

Television station in Wichita, Kansas (1953–1956)

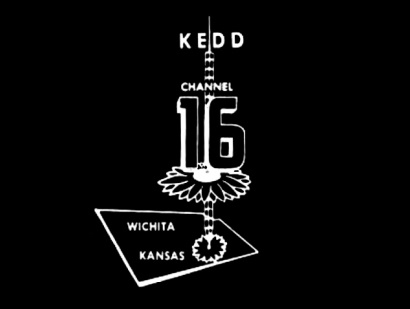

Wichita, Kansas; United States
- Channels: Analog: 16 (UHF)

Programming
- Affiliations: NBC (1953−1956); ABC (secondary, 1953−1954)

Ownership
- Owner: KEDD, Inc.

History
- First air date: August 15, 1953
- Last air date: April 30, 1956

Technical information
- ERP: 245 kW
- HAAT: 204 m (670 ft)
- Transmitter coordinates: 37°45′01″N 97°18′12″W

KEDD (channel 16) was a television station in Wichita, Kansas, United States, that operated from August 15, 1953, to April 30, 1956. It was the first television station based in Wichita. The station's studios were located at 2815 East 37th Street North.

The start-up of two VHF stations in Wichita put KEDD at a disadvantage economically, spurring the station to file for bankruptcy in 1955. The second of these stations, KARD-TV, signed on as an independent, and NBC decided in early 1956 to move its programs there, signaling channel 16's demise.

== History ==
On February 18, 1953, the Federal Communications Commission (FCC) granted a construction permit to C.W.C. (Durwood Theatres), a movie theater operator in Missouri and Kansas, for a new UHF television station on channel 16 in Wichita. It was the first such permit granted for the city, which had two VHF stations (channels 3 and 10) tied up in comparative hearings.

KEDD was expected to launch July 1, 1953, but it missed its planned start date by more than a month and a half as RCA was forced to make adjustments to the channel 16 antenna, the first such model it had manufactured. The station began broadcasting a test pattern on August 15, and regular programs started a week later on August 22. It was nearly three months before the first live studio show from the facilities at 37th and Hillside streets went to air in mid-November.

KEDD had a primary affiliation with NBC and was an interconnected affiliate; it also carried ABC programming on a secondary basis. In 1954, KAKE-TV channel 10 signed on as the first VHF station in Wichita itself and took the ABC affiliation, but KEDD remained with NBC. That December, the station dealt with a strike by engineers who were seeking to unionize.

In addition to network programs, KEDD produced several live and local shows. Children's program Bar 16 Ranch ran throughout the station's life. In 1955, channel 16 began airing Hi Fi Hop, hosted by KAKE radio disc jockey Dick Williams; this program outlived the station, returning on KTVH in the fall of 1956. There were also local news, weather, and sports programs. Jerry Dunphy started at the station in 1954 before being hired away by Milwaukee's WXIX in 1955; he later went on to a successful career as a news anchor in Los Angeles.

By 1955, the losses involved in running a UHF station with VHF competition were mounting. That July, Atlantic Television Company of New York filed to have a receiver appointed for channel 16. In response, KEDD filed itself for bankruptcy reorganization in a federal court in Topeka, where the company had been incorporated; it admitted to being $200,000 in debt. In November, the station posted a $43,804 check, which represented just 10 percent of the allowed claims of creditors, some of whom alleged their debts to be greater than what the company claimed.

In September 1955, a second VHF station appeared: KARD-TV channel 3. However, it initially operated without a network affiliation, except for a six-day period in October 1955 when KARD-TV was allowed to run NBC programs during a six-day outage of KEDD, its normal affiliate, after a section of transmission line had burned out. The possibility of a loss of NBC affiliation was also mentioned in the court case, with evidence admitted that a change of ownership could cause the network hookup to be lost. The obvious turn of events—NBC's move to KARD-TV, a VHF station—was announced on February 2, 1956, to take effect on May 1. The station signed off for the last time on April 30, 1956, due to the station's financial problems and the decision of NBC to move its affiliation to KARD-TV. Within four months, Hutchinson-based KTVH moved into the studios, which were used on a secondary basis. The Durwoods continued to own the site, leasing it to KTVH, until 1977, when the FCC ruled that it could serve as channel 12's main studio; at that time, the station purchased the property and expanded the facility.

The KEDD construction permit was canceled and call letters deleted in February 1957. The 1965 UHF allocation revision replaced channel 16 with channel 24; in 1966, a construction permit was issued for KWIS, a proposed Overmyer Network station that never came to fruition. Another UHF station was not built in Wichita until KSAS-TV started up in 1985.
