= KBSH-DT =

Television station in Hays, Kansas

Semi-satellite of KWCH-DT, Hutchinson–Wichita, Kansas
- Hays–Great Bend, Kansas; United States
- City: Hays, Kansas
- Channels: Digital: 7 (VHF); Virtual: 7
- Branding: KBSH 7

Programming
- Network: Kansas Broadcasting System
- Affiliations: 7.1: CBS; for others, see § Technical information and subchannels

Ownership
- Owner: Gray Media; (Gray Television Licensee, LLC)
- Sister stations: KWCH-DT; KSCW-DT

History
- First air date: September 2, 1958
- Former call signs: KAYS-TV (1958–1989); KBSH-TV (1989–2009)
- Former channel numbers: Analog: 7 (VHF, 1958–2009); Digital: 20 (UHF, until 2009)
- Former affiliations: ABC (1958–1962)
- Call sign meaning: Kansas Broadcasting System/Hays

Technical information
- Licensing authority: FCC
- Facility ID: 66415
- ERP: 38.8 kW
- HAAT: 216 m (709 ft)
- Transmitter coordinates: 38°53′1″N 99°20′15″W

Links
- Public license information: Public file; LMS
- Website: www.kwch.com

KBSH-DT (channel 7) is a television station licensed to Hays, Kansas, United States, affiliated with CBS and owned by Gray Media. The station's news bureau, advertising sales office and transmitter are located on Hall Street in northwest Hays.

KBSH-DT is part of the Kansas Broadcasting System (KBS), a statewide network of four full-power stations that relay programming from Wichita CBS affiliate KWCH-DT (channel 12, licensed to Hutchinson) across central and western Kansas; KBSH-DT incorporates local advertising and news inserts aimed at areas of central Kansas within the Wichita–Hutchinson Plus television market. KBSH-DT is also a sister station to Wichita-licensed CW affiliate KSCW-DT (channel 33).

== History ==
The station first signed on the air on September 2, 1958, as KAYS-TV. The station was initially a primary affiliate of ABC. KAYS-TV was founded by Hays businessmen Ross Beach and Bob Schmidt, owners of radio station KAYS (1400 AM); the television station was housed in an expansion to the radio studio building. KAYS faced stiff opposition from KCKT (channel 2, now KSNC), which signed on in November 1954 and was affiliated with NBC in concert with Garden City sister station KGLD (now KSNG). The construction of KAYS-TV was marred by tragedy when a pulley broke, causing 22-year-old Ronnie Barnett of Oklahoma City, employed by a tower crew, to fall 150 feet (46 m) to his death; another person survived.

After KAYS-TV went on the air, KAKE-TV and its two affiliated stations (KAYS-TV and KTVC in Ensign) began branding as the Golden K Network. However, KTVC changed affiliations to CBS in 1961. On September 1, 1962, KAYS-TV followed suit and changed affiliations from ABC to CBS. That same year, it purchased KWHT-TV in Goodland and changed its call letters to KLOE-TV. The three stations and KTVH in Hutchinson then formed the Kansas Broadcasting System (KBS), the CBS affiliate for central and western Kansas.

In 1983, the Cowles family, which owned KTVH, began selling off its vast media holdings. KTVH was sold to the Kansas Broadcasting System Corporation, which was owned by Beach and Schmidt; the network also purchased KTVC in 1988, owning all four stations for the first time. The next year, the Kansas Broadcasting System Corporation was purchased by Smith Broadcasting; after the sale was completed, the station changed its call letters to KBSH-TV, as part of an effort that saw KWCH's three semi-satellites change their call letters to help viewers think of the stations as part of one large network. The sale effectively separated the station from KAYS radio, which continues to maintain studio facilities from channel 7's studios, along with the rest of Eagle Radio's Hays station cluster. Smith sold the station to Spartanburg, South Carolina–based Spartan Communications in 1994; Spartan merged with Media General in 2000.

Until the 2000s, Cox Communications carried both KBSH and KWCH on its system in Great Bend (KBSH was carried on channel 7, while KWCH was carried on channel 12); Cox eventually dropped KWCH and moved KBSH to its parent station's former channel 12 position. In 2005, KWCH began operating a digital automation system from its Wichita studio facility, which handled the scheduling of advertisements and master control operations for all four KBS stations.

On April 6, 2006, Media General announced that it would sell KWCH, its satellites, and four other stations as a result of its purchase of four former NBC owned-and-operated stations (WVTM-TV in Birmingham, Alabama; WCMH-TV in Columbus, Ohio; WNCN serving Raleigh, North Carolina; and WJAR in Providence, Rhode Island). South Bend, Indiana–based Schurz Communications eventually emerged as the winner and took over on September 25, at which time Schurz formed a new subsidiary known as "Sunflower Broadcasting, Inc.", which became the licensee for its Wichita media market broadcasting properties.

Schurz announced on September 14, 2015, that it would exit broadcasting and sell its television and radio stations, including KWCH-DT and its satellites, to Gray Television for $442.5 million. Gray already owned KAKE and its satellites; however, it sold that station to Lockwood Broadcast Group and kept the KBS stations. The sale was completed on February 16, 2016.

== Newscasts ==
KAYS/KBSH provided daily newscasts from its Hall Street studios until 1991, when the Kansas Broadcasting System began consolidating its operations; full-scale evening newscasts on KBSH were discontinued, and replaced by a short insert within simulcasts of KWCH's Wichita-based newscasts. The inserts were discontinued in 2001, with the Hall Street facility being reduced to a news bureau and sales office; the two reporter/photographers employed by the station began relaying content to Wichita to be incorporated into KWCH's Eyewitness News broadcasts seen simultaneously in Wichita, Hays, Goodland and Dodge City/Ensign.

== Technical information and subchannels ==
KBSH-DT's transmitter is co-located with its offices. The station's signal is multiplexed:

Subchannels of KBSH-DT
Subchannel	Res.	Short name	Programming
7.1	1080i	KBSH-DT	CBS
7.2	480i	KBSH-WX	Always On Storm Team 12
7.3	480i	Heroes	Heroes & Icons
7.4	480i	Outlaw	Outlaw

=== Analog-to-digital conversion ===
KBSH shut down its analog signal, over VHF channel 7, on June 12, 2009, the official date on which full-power television stations in the United States transitioned from analog to digital broadcasts under federal mandate. The station's digital signal relocated from its pre-transition UHF channel 20 to VHF channel 7. On June 24, 2009, the station's callsign was officially changed to KBSH-DT to reflect the transition.
