= KWCH-DT =

Television station in Hutchinson, Kansas

- Hutchinson–Wichita, Kansas; United States
- City: Hutchinson, Kansas
- Channels: Digital: 19 (UHF); Virtual: 12
- Branding: 12 News

Programming
- Network: Kansas Broadcasting System
- Affiliations: 12.1: CBS; for others, see § Technical information and subchannels

Ownership
- Owner: Gray Media; (Gray Television Licensee, LLC)
- Sister stations: KSCW-DT; KBSD-DT; KBSH-DT; KBSL-DT

History
- First air date: July 1, 1953
- Former call signs: KTVH (1952–1983); KWCH-TV (1983–2009)
- Former channel numbers: Analog: 12 (VHF, 1953–2009); Digital: 12 (VHF, February−September 2009)
- Former affiliations: All secondary: ABC (1953–1954); DuMont (1953–1955); NBC (1953–1956)
- Call sign meaning: "Wichita"

Technical information
- Licensing authority: FCC
- Facility ID: 66413
- ERP: 1,000 kW
- HAAT: 421 m (1,381 ft)
- Transmitter coordinates: 38°3′37.6″N 97°45′49.7″W

Links
- Public license information: Public file; LMS
- Website: www.kwch.com

KWCH-DT (channel 12) is a television station licensed to Hutchinson, Kansas, United States, serving the Wichita area as an affiliate of CBS. It is owned by Gray Media alongside CW affiliate KSCW-DT (channel 33) and maintains studios on 37th Street North in northeast Wichita and a transmitter facility located east of Hutchinson in rural northeastern Reno County. KWCH-DT serves as the flagship of the Kansas Broadcasting System (KBS), a network of four full-power stations that relay CBS network and other programming provided by KWCH across central and western Kansas, as well as bordering counties in Colorado, Nebraska, and Oklahoma.

The station was established as KTVH in Hutchinson on July 1, 1953, and was the first television station built within the state. Though based in Hutchinson until 1978, when the main studio was officially moved to Wichita, it has had a presence in that city since 1954. The KBS network took its present form in the early 1960s. KTVH was the third-rated news outlet in the area until the owners of two of the other three KBS stations purchased it, changed the call letters to KWCH in 1983, and successfully led it to first place in the local ratings.

== History ==
=== KTVH ===
On June 30, 1952, Wichita-Hutchinson Company, Inc., filed an application for a construction permit to build channel 12 in Hutchinson, which the Federal Communications Commission (FCC) granted on January 7, 1953. The company was composed of several shareholders from Hutchinson and other Kansas cities, including Ray Dillon of the Dillons grocery store family; local car dealer J. C. Child; W. D. P. Carey, whose family owned salt mines; the publisher of The Hutchinson News-Herald; and the owner of radio station KWBW. The call letters KTVH were selected; a tract of land on Plum Street was purchased for studio facilities; and a tower site was acquired selected east of town. The first test pattern went out on June 24, 1953, ahead of July 1, when the station launched as the first commercial television station based in Kansas. (Note: On June 6, Kansas City, Missouri's KCTY had gone on air from a transmitter in Overland Park.)

KTVH was the first television station to open that covered Wichita, the state's largest city. In August 1954, channel 12 opened a satellite studio in Wichita's Lassen Hotel. Its attempts to identify as a station serving both Hutchinson and Wichita, in what would become a running theme in the first three decades of station history, rankled the stations licensed there. KAKE radio and KAKE-TV petitioned the FCC in November 1954 to order KTVH to stop identifying as a "Wichita station"; it declined to do so.

In 1955, Wichita-Hutchinson Company sold 80 percent of KTVH to the Des Moines-based Minneapolis Star & Tribune Company, owned by the Cowles family, for $1.07 million. The Star & Tribune Company expanded channel 12's Wichita presence in 1956 by purchasing the former studios of KEDD, the first station to be built in that city, which had just closed. A power increase from 240,000 watts to the class-maximum 316,000 watts followed in 1957. The new owners also made a second effort at seeking permission to identify more closely with Wichita in 1958; the station's president, Joyce Swan, cited confusion from national advertisers, who thought the dual designation of Wichita and Hutchinson signified separate markets, and stated that "it is obvious that an advertising media that covers a large area must cater to the largest metropolitan market". The FCC allowed it to identify as "Hutchinson–Wichita" in 1959 and further tossed out petitions for reconsideration from the two Wichita commercial stations.

As KTVH grew, other television stations were set up in western and central Kansas. KTVC at Ensign, serving communities in southwestern Kansas including Dodge City and Garden City, launched in 1957; in 1958, television stations were established at Goodland (KWGB-TV) and Hays (KAYS-TV) in the northwestern part of the state. KWGB-TV aired CBS and NBC programs, while KTVC and KAYS-TV were ABC affiliates engaged in a regional hookup with KAKE-TV known as the "Golden K Network". In 1961, KTVC switched affiliations from ABC to CBS. The owners of KAYS-TV purchased the Goodland station, by then known as KWHT-TV. Both stations underwent changes: KAYS-TV announced it would join CBS on September 1, 1962, and KWHT-TV changed its call letters in October to KLOE-TV, matching co-owned KLOE radio. KTVC, KLOE, and KAYS then joined KTVH to form the Kansas Broadcasting System (KBS), with KTVH as the flagship. KBS claimed coverage of 66 Kansas counties as well as portions of Oklahoma and Colorado. In 1963, KTVH activated a new transmitter located northwest of Burrton and east of Hutchinson, operating from the tallest broadcast tower in the state at 1,504 ft (458 m).

The Star & Tribune Company announced the sale of KTVH to the WKY Television System of Oklahoma City, owned by the Gaylord family, for $4.4 million in December 1968. However, much to both parties' surprise, the FCC voted 4–2 to designate the transaction for hearing in August 1969. The decision was met with dissension even from FCC chairman Rosel H. Hyde, who complained that the majority's conclusions that the acquisition of the Hutchinson station would give the Gaylord interests too much media power and that it might downgrade program service were prejudicial. Hearings were set for November, but this was near the expiration date of the sale contract on December 31, and the Star & Tribune Company refused to extend it beyond that date. During that time, the FCC also got a new chair, Dean Burch, who chided the commission for taking nine months to designate the proposed sale for hearing; when the two parties asked for approval without such a hearing, the commission refused, preventing the sale from moving forward.

After the WKY sale bid collapsed, the Star & Tribune Company retained KTVH for another 14 years. In 1976, the FCC granted permission for KTVH to shift its main studio from Hutchinson to Wichita as long as it retained current staffing and service levels at its Hutchinson site. In response, channel 12 purchased the Wichita studio site outright after having leased it for 20 years; it also bought an adjacent tract of land and embarked on an expansion of the facility that more than doubled its size. In 1978, KTVH originated 45 percent of its local programming from Hutchinson and 55 percent from Wichita.

=== "The Look of a Leader" ===
By 1982, Cowles Media—as the Minneapolis Star & Tribune Company was renamed that year to reflect its media diversification—owned two television properties: KTVH and WDRB, an independent station in Louisville, Kentucky. The Hutchinson station was among its most profitable divisions. However, the company had suffered through an 89 percent decline in earnings in 1981, sparking rumors of a sale. The rumors became reality at the end of July when Cowles agreed to sell KTVH for $12 million to Kansas Broadcasting System Inc., a partnership of Hays businessmen Ross Beach and Robert E. Schmidt of Hays, owners of KAYS and KLOE.

The sale took effect in January 1983. Beach and Schmidt hired a new general manager, Ron Bergamo, and set out to turn around a station stuck in third place in the local news ratings (particularly in the Wichita metro itself) and with a staid reputation. This included major investments in new equipment and hiring consultants to plot a major image revamp, as well as a change of call letters from KTVH to KWCH, which took effect July 4. A goal was set to turn the station into a first-place finisher within 12 to 18 months, and coinciding with the new call letters, the motto "The Look of a Leader" was adopted.

Under Beach and Schmidt, the rebadged KWCH turned around its local news ratings and had become a serious and successful challenger to KAKE, the metro-area leader, by 1986. By 1988, it had dislodged KAKE from first place in a majority of time slots. In addition, Beach and Schmidt had acquired KTVC, the last television station in western Kansas not owned by a Wichita-area station, in 1988. The turnaround attracted the interest of Michigan-based Smith Broadcasting, who made an unexpected and unsolicited $45 million purchase offer for KBS that Beach and Schmidt accepted that same year. Among Smith's first actions were to appoint part-owner Sandy DiPasquale, who later became the CEO of Newport Television, as president and general manager and to change the call letters on the western and central Kansas stations to designations that incorporated "KBS". DiPasquale became the majority owner in 1992 as Smith sold his interests in KBS to buy other broadcast properties.

Spartan Communications of Spartanburg, South Carolina, purchased KBS from DiPasquale in 1994 for $58 million. Spartan merged with Media General in 2000.

=== Schurz and Gray ownership ===
On April 6, 2006, Media General announced that it would sell KWCH, its satellites, and four other stations as a result of its purchase of four former NBC owned-and-operated stations (WVTM-TV in Birmingham, Alabama; WCMH-TV in Columbus, Ohio; WNCN serving Raleigh, North Carolina; and WJAR in Providence, Rhode Island). South Bend, Indiana–based Schurz Communications eventually emerged as the winner and took over on September 25, at which time Schurz formed a new subsidiary known as "Sunflower Broadcasting, Inc.", which became the licensee for its Wichita media market broadcasting properties. In July 2007, KSCW became a sister station to KWCH after Schurz bought the station through a failing station waiver. (Note: The FCC can issue a failing station waiver allowing for the creation of a duopoly in markets otherwise too small to permit one legally (as is the case in Wichita), or involving two stations rated in the top four, under certain circumstances relating to lack of other suitable buyers; low ratings; three years of negative cash flow; and public interest benefit of the merger.) In 2009, Schurz further expanded its operations by entering into an agreement with Entravision Communications, which was preparing to launch Univision affiliate KDCU-DT, to provide local advertising sales, technical functions, and transmitter tower space. The partnership expanded in 2011 with the addition of a local newscast.

Schurz announced on September 14, 2015, that it would exit from broadcasting and sell its entire broadcasting division, including KWCH (and its satellites), KSCW-DT, and the JSA with KDCU-DT, to Gray Television for approximately $442.5 million. Gray already owned KAKE, which it divested to Lockwood Broadcast Group in order to retain the higher-rated KWCH. The FCC approved the sale on February 12, 2016, and the sale was completed on February 16.

== News operation ==
Prior to 1983, KTVH was generally an also-ran in local news. Viewers found it stodgy and conservative, and KAKE and KSNW both regularly trounced channel 12 in the ratings; KAKE drew three to four times as many households in the Wichita metro, while KTVH drew barely half the news ratings of KSN in the full market. In 1978, when the station overhauled its news product, it also had the market's smallest newsgathering staff with nine reporter-photographers where KARD had 12 and KAKE had 22. The KWCH overhaul orchestrated by Beach and Schmidt brought a series of changes, including the adoption of the Eyewitness News moniker; the station's first professionally built set; and a new female anchor, Susan Peters, to present the news alongside market veteran Roger Cornish. Over the decade that followed, KWCH rose to the top of the local news ratings, first in the Wichita metro and then in the full market beginning in 1991.

The other KBS stations, which were not co-owned with KWCH until the 1980s, produced their own local news programs. In 1991, KBSH in Hays abandoned its longstanding separate evening news and switched to inserting a segment of local news into the KWCH broadcasts. In January 2002, this was discontinued, and news stories from Hays were sent to Wichita for incorporation into KWCH's newscasts. Similarly, the local news in Dodge City was trimmed back from a full program to inserts and then to reports in KWCH's own newscasts. In 2005, KWCH began producing an insert into its news for Cox Communications cable customers in Salina.

On January 19, 2004, KWCH began producing a half-hour prime time newscast at 9 p.m. for Fox affiliate KSAS-TV through a news share agreement. In September 2007, after its acquisition of KSCW, KWCH began producing a two-hour extension of its weekday morning newscast for KSCW; this later expanded on September 12, 2011, to include half-hour newscasts at 4 p.m. weekdays and nightly at 9 p.m. For the rest of 2011, KSAS and KSCW carried simultaneous and separate newscasts before KSNW assumed the KSAS news production contract at the start of 2012. This resulted in a lawsuit where KSAS alleged a breach of contract because it was receiving a taped newscast instead of a live one; the suit was settled when KWCH agreed to air the Fox newscast live for the remainder of the contract.

Beyond local news programs, KWCH operates the high school sports outlet Catch It Kansas, which includes a website and a weekly show aired on KSCW.

=== Notable former on-air staff ===
- David Bloom – reporter (1988–1990)
- Cheryl Burton – anchor
- Shon Gables – anchor/reporter
- Andrea Joyce (Andi Joyce) – anchor
- Susan Peters – anchor (1983–1991)
- Don Woods – weatherman (1953–1954)
- Lily Wu – anchor/reporter (2020–2023)

== Technical information and subchannels ==
The primary KWCH-TV transmitter is east of Hutchinson in Reno County. The station's signal is multiplexed:

Subchannels of KWCH-DT
Subchannel	Res.	Short name	Programming
12.1	1080i	KWCH-DT	CBS
12.2	480i	KWCH-WX	Always on Storm Team 12 (weather)
12.3	480i	Heroes	Heroes & Icons
12.4	480i	Outlaw	Outlaw
33.1	1080i	KSCW-DT	The CW (KSCW-DT)
33.2	480i	Catchy	Catchy Comedy (KSCW-DT)

Broadcast on behalf of another station

=== Analog-to-digital conversion ===
KWCH shut down its analog signal, over VHF channel 12, on February 17, 2009, the original target date on which full-power television stations in the United States were to transition from analog to digital broadcasts under federal mandate (which was later pushed back to June 12, 2009). The station's digital signal relocated from its pre-transition UHF channel 19 to VHF channel 12.

After the transition, KWCH became one of four television stations that operated their digital signals on the VHF band that were granted a power increase later that month due to reception issues that the stations experienced as a result of moving their digital channel allocations from UHF to VHF. As reception problems continued even after the increase, the FCC granted KWCH-DT permission to swap transmitter facilities with sister station KSCW-DT; on September 29, 2009, KWCH-DT moved its digital signal back to UHF channel 19, with KSCW-DT moving its digital allocation to VHF channel 12.

In 2012, Schurz built a digital replacement translator of KSCW-DT in Wichita, broadcast from the studios. The 12.1 and 12.2 subchannels are also carried; this aids reception of KSCW and KWCH in parts of Wichita that may not get as strong a signal from the Hutchinson transmitters.

=== Satellites ===
Kansas Broadcasting System stations; KWCH-DT; KBSD-DT; KBSH-DT; KBSL-DT

KWCH operates a network of three additional full-power satellite stations covering central and western Kansas, which together with KWCH are branded as the Kansas Broadcasting System (KBS). These stations—KBSD-DT in southwestern Kansas and KBSH-DT and KBSL-DT serving northwestern Kansas—are counted as one outlet for ratings and regulatory purposes. KBS was formed in 1962 and provided network programming and advertising sales functions to the then-separately owned stations; trade advertising boasted that advertisers had the ease of "One Order, One Invoice, One Check" working with KBS.

Other stations in the Kansas Broadcasting System
Station	City of license	Channel; TV (RF)	Facility ID	ERP	HAAT	First air date	Transmitter coordinates	FCC info
KBSD-DT	Ensign	6 (6)	66414	31 kW	219 m (719 ft)	July 24, 1957	37°38′28.3″N 100°20′40.8″W	Public file; LMS
KBSH-DT	Hays	7 (7)	66415	38.8 kW	216 m (709 ft)	September 2, 1958	38°53′0.9″N 99°20′15.7″W	Public file; LMS
KBSL-DT	Goodland	10 (10)	66416	89.6 kW	299 m (981 ft)	September 11, 1958	39°28′9.7″N 101°33′20.8″W	Public file; LMS
