= KDCU-DT =

Television station in Derby, Kansas

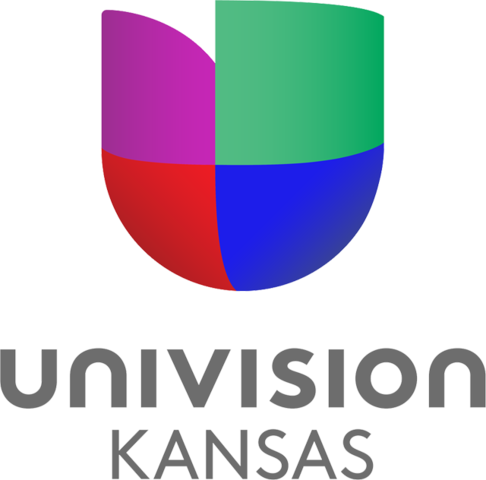
- Derby–Wichita–Hutchinson, Kansas; United States
- City: Derby, Kansas
- Channels: Digital: 31 (UHF); Virtual: 46
- Branding: Univision Kansas

Programming
- Affiliations: 46.1: Univision; for others, see § Subchannels

Ownership
- Owner: Entravision Communications; (Entravision Holdings, LLC)

History
- Founded: February 15, 2008
- First air date: August 20, 2009
- Former channel number: Virtual: 31 (2009–2023)
- Call sign meaning: Kansas Derby City Univision

Technical information
- Licensing authority: FCC
- Facility ID: 166332
- ERP: 1,000 kW
- HAAT: 345 m (1,132 ft)
- Transmitter coordinates: 37°48′1″N 97°31′29″W

Links
- Public license information: Public file; LMS
- Website: noticiaskansas.com

KDCU-DT (channel 46) is a television station licensed to Derby, Kansas, United States, serving the Wichita–Hutchinson market as an affiliate of the Spanish-language network Univision. Owned by Entravision Communications, the station maintains offices on East Douglas Avenue in downtown Wichita; its newscasts are produced at the KCEC studios on Mile High Stadium West Circle in Denver, Colorado. KDCU-DT's transmitter is located in rural northwestern Sedgwick County (north-northeast of Colwich).

== History ==
Original KDCU logo, used from August 20, 2009, to December 31, 2012.

The station first signed on the air on August 20, 2009, becoming the first (and so far only) full-power Spanish-language television station to sign on in the state of Kansas; because it signed on after the June 12 digital television transition that year, KDCU was also the first full-power television station in the Wichita–Hutchinson Plus market to sign-on without a companion analog signal.

Prior to the station's sign-on, on February 15, 2008, Entravision entered into a joint sales agreement with Schurz Communications (then-owner of KWCH-DT and KSCW-DT), in which Schurz would provide advertising, production and promotional responsibilities as well as back office and master control services for KDCU. Schurz also leased a transmission tower located near Colwich to house the station's transmitter facilities; KSCW, which previously used the tower, moved its transmitter facilities to a tower east of Hutchinson in Reno County, which is known as the KWCH 12 Tower. Since KDCU is licensed as a full-power station, it is able to mandate carriage on cable and satellite providers in the Wichita–Hutchinson Plus market.

Previous logo from January 1, 2013, until mid-2019. This logo is still in use, just as a Horizontal version of the current logo and the CGI effects are exchanged with more 2D effects.

Schurz announced on September 14, 2015, that it would exit broadcasting and sell its television and radio stations, including KWCH-DT, KSCW-DT, and the JSA/SSA with KDCU-DT, to Gray Television for $442.5 million. The FCC approved the sale on February 12, 2016.

As of 2021, Entravision now both owns and operates KDCU-DT, as Gray sold its operation stake in the station.

== News operation ==
KDCU-DT presently broadcasts 2 1/2 hours of locally produced newscasts each week (with a half-hour each weekday); the station does not air newscasts on Saturdays or Sundays. In April 2011, KWCH produced a half-hour nightly Spanish-language newscast for KDCU, Noticias Univision Kansas, airing at 10 p.m. each weeknight (which competed against KWCH's own local newscast in that timeslot). Since Entravision acquired full shares of KDCU, the newscasts are now self-produced.

== Subchannels ==
The station's signal is multiplexed:

Subchannels of KDCU-DT
Subchannel	Res.	Short name	Programming
46.1	1080i	KDCU-DT	Univision
46.2	480i	Grit	Grit
46.3	480i	Escape	Ion Mystery
46.4	480i	Laff	Laff
46.5	480i	Court	Court TV
