= Smoky Hills PBS =

PBS member network in central and western Kansas

- Type: Non-commercial educational broadcast television network
- Country: United States
- First air date: November 10, 1982
- Availability: Western Kansas
- TV stations: See below
- Owner: Smoky Hills Public Television Corporation
- Affiliations: x.1: PBS; x.2: PBS Kids; x.3: Create
- Official website: www.smokyhillspbs.org

Smoky Hills PBS (formerly Smoky Hills Public Television) is a regional network of PBS member television stations serving central and western portions of the U.S. state of Kansas. It is operated by the Smoky Hills Public Television Corporation, a non-profit organization which holds the licenses for all of the stations licensed in the network. The broadcast signals of the four stations cover most of the western half of the state outside Wichita.

The network produces public affairs programming and holds the broadcast rights to several Kansas high school athletic championship events sanctioned by the Kansas State High School Activities Association. The network's offices and operations center are located in a historic native stone building on Elm Street in Bunker Hill (just east of Russell).

== History ==
The Smoky Hills Public Television Corporation was founded in 1978, with the intent to start a non-commercial educational television station in western Kansas. This region is part of the Wichita–Hutchinson Plus market, an unusually large market that covers over 70 counties stretching from the Flint Hills to the Colorado border–almost three-fourths of the state. It is the largest designated market area (DMA) by number of counties in the United States. Previously, much of the area received PBS programming on cable via either Wichita member station KPTS (channel 8) or Denver member station KRMA-TV (channel 6).

Flagship station KOOD (channel 16) in Hays was the first station in the network to sign on the air on November 10, 1982. This was followed by the debut of full-power satellites KSWK (channel 8) in Lakin (also serving Garden City) on March 15, 1989, and KDCK (channel 21) in Dodge City on March 3, 1998. KWKS (channel 19) in Colby was the last satellite to sign on, debuting as a digital-only station, in June 2007.

Most viewers watch Smoky Hills PBS's programming through cable, which is all but essential for acceptable television in most of this vast area due to its hilly terrain. In 2005, satellite providers DirecTV and Dish Network began carrying the network in the Wichita market, boosting its potential viewership to over 1.5 million people in Kansas and Nebraska.

== Programming ==
Locally produced programs broadcast by Smoky Hills PBS include the medical advice program Doctors On Call, the public affairs program The Kansas Legislature, the high school sports highlight program Scoreboard Show and the music program Down Home Country: Live in Branson. The network also holds broadcast rights to the Miss Southwest Kansas Pageant as well as several Kansas high school athletic championship events sanctioned by the Kansas State High School Activities Association (including the Eight-Man Division 1 and 2 Football Championship games, Class 3-2-1A state wrestling tournament and the Class 1A girls' and boys' basketball tournament championship games). Smoky Hills PBS also broadcasts the Signature Auction, an annual fundraiser held each March; as well as Kansas Candidates, an ongoing series held during the election season.

== Stations ==
Station	City of license	Channels (Digital)	First air date	Call letters' meaning	ERP	HAAT	Facility ID	Transmitter coordinates	Public license information
KOOD^{1}	Hays	16 (UHF); 9	November 10, 1982		496 kW	304 m (997 ft)	60675	38°46′16″N 98°44′17″W	Public file LMS
KSWK	Lakin	8 (VHF); 3	March 15, 1989	Southwestern Kansas	33 kW	153 m (502 ft)	60683	37°49′39.9″N 101°6′36.9″W	Public file LMS
KDCK^{2}	Dodge City	21 (UHF); 21	March 1998	Dodge City, Kansas	8.42 kW	99 m (325 ft)	79258	37°49′32.8″N 100°10′42.5″W	Public file LMS
KWKS^{2}	Colby	19 (UHF); 19	June 2007	Western Kansas	464 kW	383 m (1,257 ft)	162115	39°14′31″N 101°21′40″W	Public file LMS

Notes:

- 1. KOOD used the call sign KSMH-TV during its construction permit from 1980 to 1982.
- 2. KDCK and KWKS did not have companion digital channels, and therefore are operating on their pre-transition channels, which map to the same channels via PSIP. KDCK flash-cut its digital signal into operation in 2003.

Until 2009, Smoky Hills Public Television also relayed its signal on seven low-power translator stations:

Station	Channels	City of license	Facility ID
K15CG	15 (UHF)	Oakley	60670
K23BU	23 (UHF)	Goodland	60674
K32BY	32 (UHF)	Oberlin	60669
K39BS	39 (UHF)	Norton	60682
K64BS	64 (UHF)	Concordia	60685
K66CD	66 (UHF)	Phillipsburg	60680
K69DB	69 (UHF)	Hoxie	60156

The Hoxie translator was owned by the government of Sheridan County, the others were owned by the Smoky Hills Public Television Corporation. All of the translators were taken out of service upon the digital television transition in 2009 as KWKS-DT covered over the Northwest Kansas translators: K15CG; K23BU; K32BY; K39BS; & K69DB.

== Technical information ==
=== Subchannels ===
The digital channels of each of the Smoky Hills PBS stations are multiplexed:

Smoky Hills PBS multiplex
Subchannel				Res.	Short name	Programming
KOOD	KSWK	KDCK	KWKS	Res.	Short name	Programming
9.1	3.1	21.1	19.1	1080i	PBS	PBS
9.2	3.2	21.2	19.2	1080i	KIDS	PBS Kids
9.3	3.3	21.3	19.3	480i	CREATE	Create

=== Analog-to-digital conversion ===
Although the DTV Delay Act extended the mandatory deadline to June 12, 2009, Smoky Hills Public Television shut down the analog signals of two of its stations as originally scheduled on February 17, 2009, the original date on which full-power television stations in the United States were scheduled to transition from analog to digital broadcasts. KOOD and KSWK shut down their respective analog signals, over UHF channel 16 and VHF channel 8, on that date. KOOD's digital signal remained on its pre-transition UHF channel 16, using virtual channel 9; KSWK's digital signal remained on its pre-transition VHF channel 8, using virtual channel 3.
