= Cameron Sanders =

American journalist (born 1958)

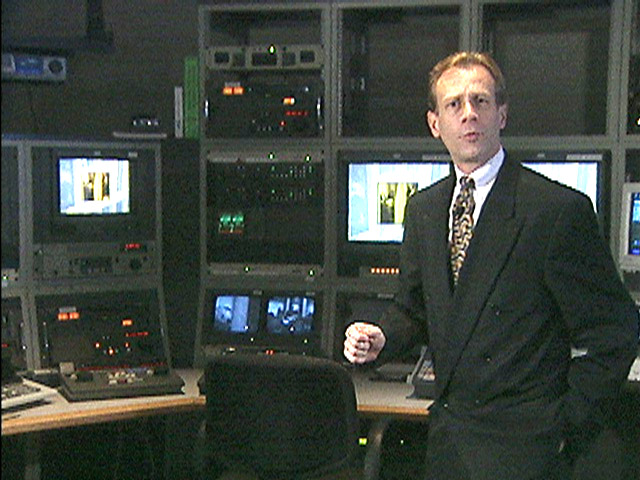
Cameron Sanders

Ronald L. "Cameron" Sanders (born May 30, 1958) is an American journalist.

He served as business editor and host of public radio's Marketplace and a correspondent for CNN from 1989 to 1993, being based in Los Angeles. He served as a Vice President of A. G. Edwards (now Wells Fargo Advisors) from 1993 to 2002, based in St. Louis, Missouri. Following his time at CNN and public radio, Sanders was President of the Media Communications Association-International and Chairman of the University City, Missouri Commission for Access and Local Original Programming (CALOP), which allocated funds derived from cable TV subscribers to fund local filmmakers to create quality programs about local culture, arts and history. While CALOP Chair (and, later, executive director), he hosted Liquid Light, a prime time cable television show on the Higher Education Consortium cable channel (HEC-TV) in the St. Louis region (2003–2008), which featured local filmmakers and documentarians.
