= KGKC-LD =

Television station in Lawrence, Kansas

- Kansas City, Missouri (Note: Originally licensed to Lawrence, Kansas; moved to Kansas City in 2025.); United States
- Channels: Digital: 33 (UHF); Virtual: 39
- Branding: Telemundo Kansas City

Programming
- Affiliations: 39.1: Telemundo; for others, see § KGKC-LD subchannels

Ownership
- Owner: SagamoreHill Broadcasting; (SagamoreHill of Kansas City Licenses, LLC)

History
- Founded: August 19, 2005
- First air date: October 7, 2008
- Former call signs: K10PD (2005–2008); KGKC-LP (2008–2012)
- Former channel numbers: Analog: 10 (VHF, 2005–2012); Digital: 39 (UHF, 2012–2018)
- Former affiliations: Spanish Religious (2008–2018)
- Call sign meaning: Kansas City

Technical information
- Licensing authority: FCC
- Facility ID: 130417
- Class: LD
- ERP: 15 kW
- HAAT: 268.7 m (882 ft)
- Transmitter coordinates: 39°1′19.9″N 94°30′49.7″W

Links
- Public license information: LMS
- Website: telemundokc.com

Satellite station
- KGKM-LD
- Columbia–Jefferson City, Missouri
- City: Columbia, Missouri
- Channels: Digital: 36 (UHF); Virtual: 36

Programming
- Affiliations: 36.1: Telemundo; for others, see § KGKM-LD subchannels

History
- Founded: February 22, 2011
- First air date: February 2, 2022
- Former call signs: K36LJ-D (2011–2022)

Technical information
- Facility ID: 184505
- Class: LD
- ERP: 15 kW
- HAAT: 193.5 m (635 ft)
- Transmitter coordinates: 38°47′28″N 92°17′44″W

Links
- Public license information: LMS

KGKC-LD (channel 39) is a low-power television station in Kansas City, Missouri, United States, affiliated with the Spanish-language network Telemundo. Owned by SagamoreHill Broadcasting, the station has studios on Broadway Boulevard in the Westside neighborhood of Kansas City, Missouri, and its transmitter is located in the city's Brown Estates neighborhood.

KGKM-LD (channel 36) in Columbia, Missouri, operates as a full-time, low-power satellite of KGKC-LD; this station's transmitter is located on Edwards Road northwest of Ashland, Missouri. KGKM-LD covers Columbia, Jefferson City, and other areas of central Missouri. Except for hourly station identifications required by the Federal Communications Commission (FCC), there is no on-air mention that KGKM-LD exists, and aside from the transmitter, KGKM-LD does not maintain any physical presence locally in Columbia. Unlike its parent station, KGKM-LD does not carry any of KGKC-LD's subchannels and has a different subchannel lineup.

== History ==
Originally licensed to Lawrence, Kansas, KGKC-LD became a Telemundo affiliate in September 2018. Prior to that, it aired Spanish-language religious programming.

== News operation ==
In addition to broadcasting Noticias Telemundo, the national news program from Telemundo, KGKC-LD produces brief news inserts called Acceso Total (Total Access) that focus on stories from the Kansas City and Central Missouri areas.

On September 15, 2023, KGKC-LD announced that it had teamed up with Hearst Television's ABC affiliate in Kansas City, KMBC-TV, to provide daily Spanish-language weather forecasts for the station.

On February 6, 2025, Adan Manzano, an anchor on Acceso Total, died in New Orleans while covering the Kansas City Chiefs' run in Super Bowl LIX.

== Subchannels ==
The stations' signals are multiplexed:

=== KGKC-LD subchannels ===
Subchannels of KGKC-LD
| Subchannel | Res. | Short name | Programming |
|---|---|---|---|
| 39.1 | 1080i | KGKC | Telemundo |
| 39.2 | 480i | Start | Start TV |
| 39.3 | 480i | JTV | Jewelry TV |
| 39.4 | 480i | ShopLC | Shop LC |
| 39.5 | 480i | TXitos | TeleXitos |
| 39.6 | 480i | Sonlife | Sonlife (4:3) |
| 39.7 | 480i | Toons | MeTV Toons |

=== KGKM-LD subchannels ===
Subchannels of KGKM-LD
| Subchannel | Res. | Short name | Programming |
|---|---|---|---|
| 36.1 | 720p | KGKM-LD | Telemundo |
| 36.2 | 480i | ION | Ion |
| 36.3 | 480i | COURTTV | Court TV |
| 36.4 | 480i | IONPlus | Ion Plus |
| 36.5 | 480i | GRIT | Grit |
| 36.6 | 480i | Mystery | Ion Mystery |
| 36.7 | 480i | SONLIFE | SonLife (4:3) |
