= KSAS-TV =

Television station in Wichita, Kansas

- Wichita, Kansas; United States
- City: Wichita, Kansas
- Channels: Digital: 26 (UHF); Virtual: 24
- Branding: Fox Kansas; MyTV Wichita (24.2)

Programming
- Affiliations: 24.1: Fox; 24.2: Independent with MyNetworkTV; 24.3: Comet

Ownership
- Owner: Sinclair Broadcast Group; (KSAS Licensee, LLC)
- Sister stations: KMTW

History
- Founded: June 4, 1984
- First air date: August 24, 1985
- Former call signs: KSAS (1984–1985)
- Former channel numbers: Analog: 24 (UHF, 1985–2009)
- Former affiliations: Independent (1985–1986); UPN (secondary, 1995–2001)
- Call sign meaning: Kansas

Technical information
- Licensing authority: FCC
- Facility ID: 11911
- ERP: 350 kW
- HAAT: 303 m (994 ft)
- Transmitter coordinates: 37°46′40″N 97°30′37″W
- Translator(s): see § Satellites

Links
- Public license information: Public file; LMS
- Website: foxkansas.com; mytvwichita.com

KSAS-TV (channel 24) is a television station in Wichita, Kansas, United States, affiliated with Fox and MyNetworkTV. It is owned by Sinclair Broadcast Group, which provides certain services to Hutchinson-licensed KMTW (channel 36) under a local marketing agreement (LMA) with Mercury Broadcasting Company. The two stations share studios on West Street in northwestern Wichita; KSAS-TV's transmitter is located in rural northwestern Sedgwick County (east of Colwich).

== History ==
The station first signed on the air on August 24, 1985; it was founded by a limited partnership known as Columbia-Kansas TV Ltd., which was restructured into Channel 24 Ltd. before it signed on. Originally operating as an independent station, channel 24 was the first such station licensed to Kansas as well as the first commercial television station to sign on in the Wichita market since KARD-TV (channel 3, now KSNW) debuted 30 years earlier in September 1955. The station became a charter affiliate of Fox when the network launched on October 9, 1986. However, like most Fox stations early on, it continued to program as a de facto independent for Fox's first eight years of existence.

On April 3, 1988, KAAS-TV (channel 18) signed on in Salina as a full-time satellite of KSAS. The station later added repeaters in Western Kansas in 1995, with the launches of low-power stations KSAS-LP (channel 29) in Dodge City and KAAS-LP (channel 31) in Garden City. Channel 24 Ltd. filed for bankruptcy in the late 1980s, and was eventually bought out by Clear Channel Communications in August 1990.

On June 27, 1997, Clear Channel Communications entered into a local marketing agreement with Goddard-based Three Feathers Communications, Inc. to form a new television station in Hutchinson, Kansas. Initially bearing the name KAWJ, the construction permit of the station took the KSCC ("Kansas Clear Channel", channel 36, now known as KMTW) call letters on October 9, 1998. An application was filled by Three Feathers on July 30, 1999, to sell the license of KSCC to Viacom's Paramount Stations Group, which was granted by the FCC on October 1 the same year. The station officially signed on January 5, 2001, with the station first launching on Cox Cable in August 2000, as a UPN owned-and-operated station. KSCC's license assets would later be sold to San Antonio-based Mercury Broadcasting Company prior to the station's official sign-on.

In 1998, per the suggestion of then-program director Michael Hochman, KSAS changed its branding from "Fox 24" to "Fox Kansas", in order to help position KSAS and its satellites as a regional "network" along the lines of the other major stations in the market (such as the Kansas State Network, the Kansas Broadcasting System, and the KAKEland Television Network). Two years later, KBDK (channel 14, now KOCW) in Hoisington was added as another full-power satellite to serve Great Bend and Hays. The Wichita–Hutchinson market's four major network stations all require at least three full-power transmitters to cover the unusually large market, which covers over 70 counties stretching from the Flint Hills to the Colorado border (encompassing almost three-fourths of the state), making it the largest media market by number of counties in the United States.

In 2005, KSAS became a crucial location in the search for and apprehension of infamous Wichita serial killer Dennis Rader, known for decades as the anonymous BTK Killer. Rader's last known communication with the media and police was a padded envelope which arrived at KSAS' West Street studios (one of many stations in the Wichita market which Rader had contacted over the years) on February 16 of that year. Enclosed in the package was a purple, 1.44-MB Memorex floppy disk; a letter; a photocopy of the cover of a 1989 novel about a serial killer (Rules of Prey); and a gold-colored necklace with a large medallion. Police found metadata embedded in a Microsoft Word document on the disk that pointed to Wichita's Christ Lutheran Church and the document was marked as last modified by "Dennis". A search of the church website turned up Dennis Rader as president of the congregation council.

On April 20, 2007, Clear Channel entered into an agreement to sell its television stations (including KSAS and its LMA with KMTW) to Newport Television, a holding company owned by private equity firm Providence Equity Partners; the deal closed on March 14, 2008. Longtime Wichita television broadcaster Sandy DiPasquale, the group's president and CEO, was part owner of Smith Broadcasting, and was the last local owner of CBS affiliate KWCH-TV from 1989 to 1994. DiPasquale moved Newport's headquarters to Kansas City in 2008 from his longtime base in Wichita.

On July 19, 2012, Newport Television announced the sale of KSAS-TV to the Sinclair Broadcast Group as part of a group deal worth an estimated total of $1 billion involving the sale of 22 stations to Sinclair, the Nexstar Broadcasting Group and the Cox Media Group; the local marketing agreement with KMTW was included in the purchase. The transaction was finalized on December 3.

=== Addition of MyNetworkTV affiliation ===
On September 15, 2021, it was announced that MyTV Wichita would move from KMTW 36.1 to KSAS-TV 24.2.

The moves were completed on September 20, 2021, causing TBD to move to 36.4, where Dabl was airing, and Dabl moved to 36.1.

== News operation ==
KAKE presently produces 3 1/2 hours of locally produced newscasts each week for KSAS-TV (with a half-hour each on weekdays, Saturdays and Sundays). KSAS-TV's studios on West Street have always been too small to house a full-scale news department, so its newscasts have been outsourced to other stations in the market.

In the mid-1990s, ABC affiliate KAKE produced news updates, branded as KAKE News 10 Update on Fox 24, that aired during Fox prime time programming between 7 and 9 p.m.; the updates served mainly to tease stories that would air on KAKE's 10 p.m. newscast. On September 29, 1997, through a news share agreement, NBC affiliate KSNW produced the first prime time newscast in the market for KSAS, a nightly 9 p.m. newscast titled Fox News at 9 (originally called Fox First News prior to its launch), along with hourly local news updates that aired during early evening and prime time programming. The program was scheduled to premiere on September 15, but was delayed due to construction delays on a secondary news set at KSNW's studios that would be used for the prime time show. The broadcast was terminated due to poor ratings, with the last edition airing on December 31, 1998. In 2000, the station announced plans to move to a larger building that would allow it to build the market's fourth in-house news department, but those plans fell through.

Another news outsourcing agreement was established in 2003 with CBS affiliate KWCH, resulting in the return of a nightly prime time newscast to channel 24, which made its debut on January 19, 2004. Known as Fox Kansas Eyewitness News at 9, the half-hour show originated from a secondary set (designed by FX Group) at KWCH's facility on East 37th Street North in northeastern Wichita. In 2005, the newscast received the "Best Large Market Newscast in Kansas" award from the Kansas Association of Broadcasters. KWCH continued production of the 9 p.m. newscast even after Schurz Communications (which acquired KWCH in 2006) purchased CW affiliate KSCW (channel 33) in 2008 under a failing station waiver and added an extension of its weekday morning newscast to that station's schedule. In October 2008, KWCH became the first station in the market to upgrade its local newscasts to high definition; although not initially included in the change, KWCH upgraded its weather forecast segments to HD in March 2009.

On September 12, 2011, KWCH began producing half-hour newscasts at 4 p.m. weekdays and seven nights a week at 9 p.m. for KSCW; the latter newscast directly competed with KWCH's newscast on KSAS, until the news share agreement between both stations expired on December 31. In theory, KWCH could have simultaneously broadcast two 9 p.m. newscasts until the expiration of the agreement, because KSAS' newscast originated from a secondary set at KWCH's studio facility; however on October 5, 2011, KSAS filed a lawsuit against KWCH in Sedgwick County District Court claiming that in violation of the news share agreement, KWCH began taping the KSAS newscasts in advance, while KWCH produced its newscast for KSCW as a live telecast; District Judge Jeff Goering signed an order requiring KWCH to restore the live newscast on KSAS while the suit was pending.

Two days later, the two stations reached an agreement, ending the suit, and allowing KWCH to produce its newscast for KSAS live until the expiration of its news share agreement with the station, after which the live broadcasts were moved back over to KSCW. After the outsourcing deal with KWCH ended, production of the 9 p.m. newscast was turned back over to KSNW on January 2, 2012. By that time, KSNW had upgraded its in-studio segments to high definition. The broadcast was renamed Fox Kansas News at 9, and originates from an updated main set at KSNW's facility which has separate duratrans indicating the KSAS broadcast.

In October 2019, KSNW announced that they would discontinue production of the 9 p.m. newscast; KAKE took over production of the 9 p.m. newscast on January 1, 2020, with the program continuing to be known as Fox Kansas News at 9.

== Technical information ==
=== Subchannels ===
The station's signal is multiplexed:

Subchannels of KSAS-TV
Subchannel	Res.	Short name	Programming
24.1	720p	FOX	Fox
24.2	720p	MyTV	Independent with MyNetworkTV
24.3	480i	Comet	Comet
36.1	480i	KMTW	Roar (KMTW)
36.2	480i	Stadium	The Nest (KMTW-DT2)

Broadcast on behalf of another station

KSAS digital subchannel 24.2 began carrying Antenna TV on August 6, 2012, replacing music video network TheCoolTV (coincidentally, this occurred before the closure of its sale to the Sinclair Broadcast Group, which dropped the network from its stations at the end of that month). On March 1, 2017, Antenna TV was replaced by TBD, an Internet-sourced network owned by Sinclair, and Antenna TV is now seen on KSCW-DT's third subchannel.

=== Analog-to-digital conversion ===
KSAS-TV shut down its analog signal, over UHF channel 24, on February 17, 2009, the original target date on which full-power television stations in the United States were to transition from analog to digital broadcasts under federal mandate (which was later pushed back to June 12, 2009). The station's digital signal remained on its pre-transition UHF channel 26, using virtual channel 24.

=== Satellites ===
KSAS-TV serves as the flagship of Fox Kansas, which consists of a network of three full-power and two low-power stations relaying Fox network programming across central and western Kansas.

These stations air virtually the exact programming as KSAS, apart from occasional local advertisements targeted to their respective viewing area. The other two full-power stations also offer KSAS' two digital subchannels. Nielsen Media Research treats KSAS and its satellites as one station in local ratings books, using the identifier name KSAS+.

Satellite stations of KSAS-TV
Station	City of license	Channel; TV (RF)	Facility ID	ERP	HAAT	Transmitter coordinates	First air date	Public license; information
KAAS-TV	Salina	17 (17)	11912	65 kW	314 m (1,030 ft)	39°6′16″N 97°23′16″W	April 3, 1988	Public file; LMS
KOCW	Hoisington	17 (14)	83181	40 kW	163 m (535 ft)	38°37′53″N 98°50′53″W	May 24, 2001	Public file; LMS

Because it was granted an original construction permit after the FCC finalized the digital television allotment plan on April 21, 1997, KOCW did not receive a companion channel for a digital broadcast signal. Instead on June 12, 2009, the station turned off its analog signal and turned on its digital signal (an action called a "flash-cut").

==== KAAS-TV translators ====
These stations can only rebroadcast KAAS-TV, due to their translator classification.

Translators of KAAS-TV
Station	City of license	Channel; TV (RF)	Facility ID	ERP	HAAT	Transmitter coordinates	First air date	Public license; information
KSAS-LP	Dodge City	17 (29)	11967	5.7 kW	124 m (407 ft)	37°46′46.9″N 100°3′39.8″W	April 25, 1995	LMS
KAAS-LP	Garden City	17 (31)	11968	8.2 kW	141 m (463 ft)	37°52′26.9″N 100°50′47.4″W	February 22, 1995	LMS

Due to their low-powered status, both KSAS-LP and KAAS-LP were not required to convert to digital until September 1, 2015.
