= KSCW-DT =

Television station in Wichita, Kansas

ATSC 3.0 station
- Wichita, Kansas; United States
- Channels: Digital: 12 (VHF); Virtual: 33
- Branding: KSCW

Programming
- Affiliations: 33.1: The CW; for others, see § Subchannels

Ownership
- Owner: Gray Media; (Gray Television Licensee, LLC)
- Sister stations: KWCH-DT, KBSH-DT, KBSD-DT, KBSL-DT, WIBW-TV

History
- Founded: June 8, 1988
- First air date: August 5, 1999
- Former call signs: KWCV (1988–2006); KSCW (2006–2009)
- Former channel numbers: Analog: 33 (UHF, 1999–2009); Digital: 31 (UHF, 2002–2009); 19 (UHF, 2009)
- Former affiliations: The WB (1999–2006)
- Call sign meaning: Kansas CW

Technical information
- Licensing authority: FCC
- Facility ID: 72348
- ERP: 66.4 kW (main signal); 15 kW (fill-in translator)
- HAAT: 449.3 m (1,474 ft)
- Transmitter coordinates: 38°3′37.6″N 97°45′49.7″W
- Translator(s): 33 (UHF) Wichita (city)

Links
- Public license information: Public file; LMS
- Website: www.kwch.com/about-us/cw/

KSCW-DT (channel 33) is a television station in Wichita, Kansas, United States, affiliated with The CW. It is owned by Gray Media alongside Hutchinson-licensed CBS affiliate KWCH-DT (channel 12). The two stations share studios on 37th Street in northeast Wichita; KSCW-DT's transmitter is located in rural northeastern Reno County (east of Hutchinson).

KSCW-DT also operates a digital replacement translator on UHF channel 33 (its previous analog signal allotment) from a transmitter in North Wichita, just north of the station's studio facility.

== History ==
KWCV's second logo used from 2003 to 2006.

The station was first licensed on June 8, 1988, under permits from LIN TV filing an application with the Federal Communications Commission (FCC), under the call letters KWCV. It was temporarily licensed as DKWCV on November 5, 1998, but on February 11, 1999, it was changed back to KWCV.

The station first signed on the air on August 5, 1999, along with LIN TV (which also briefly owned KAKE and its satellites in 2000 before selling KAKE to Benedek Broadcasting) forming and owning 50% of Banks Broadcasting, which would become the station's owner. Originally operating as a WB affiliate, it was branded on-air as "Kansas' WB". Prior to the station's launch, The WB's programming could only be viewed in the Wichita market through Chicago-based cable superstation WGN, which carried the network's programming nationwide from The WB's January 1995 launch until October 1999, or Denver's KWGN-TV on cable or satellite. The station's original transmitter was located on a tower near Colwich.

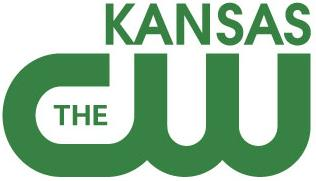
KSCW-DT's first logo as simply KSCW used from 2006 to 2008.

On January 24, 2006, the Warner Bros. unit of Time Warner and CBS Corporation announced that the two companies would shut down The WB and UPN and combine the networks' respective programming onto a newly created "fifth" network called The CW. One month later on February 22, 2006, News Corporation announced that it would launch another new network called MyNetworkTV. On March 21, not long after it was announced that the station would become the market's CW affiliate, KWCV received approval from the FCC to change its call letters to KSCW in order to reflect its upcoming affiliation change. On September 5, former UPN affiliate KMTW became Wichita's MyNetworkTV affiliate when that network launched. KSCW became the CW outlet for the market when that network launched on September 18; the station also changed its branding to "Kansas CW" on that date.

In March 2007, Banks Broadcasting announced that it would sell the station to Schurz Communications, owner of CBS affiliate KWCH (channel 12). The sale closed on July 20, 2007, after which the FCC granted Schurz a "failing station" waiver to acquire KSCW. This was necessary because the Wichita designated market area has only seven "unique" full-power television stations. The full-power stations operating outside the immediate metropolitan area all operate as satellites of each of Wichita's four major network affiliates (KWCH, KSNW (channel 3), KAKE (channel 10) and KSAS-TV (channel 24)), and the FCC considers the parent and all of its satellites together as one station. That number of unique full-power stations is normally not enough to legally support a duopoly, because Banks Broadcasting tried and failed to find a buyer for KSCW that did not need the "failing station" waiver.

Previous logo from 2008 until the early mid-2010s.

Several months after Schurz closed on its purchase of this station, it launched a new website powered by the Local Media Network division of WorldNow, replacing Broadcast Interactive Media as the operator of the site. Schurz began the process of transitioning the websites of its media properties to the Tribune Interactive platform in Summer 2010 with KWCH and KSCW being the first two using the relaunched Tribune-run platform in late-June (as of 2013, the Schurz television station websites are now operated by Internet Broadcasting). In 2009, KSCW traded transmitter facilities, moving to KWCH's tower just east of Hutchinson in Reno County.

Schurz announced on September 14, 2015, that it would exit broadcasting and sell its television and radio stations, including KSCW-DT, KWCH-DT, and the JSA with KDCU-DT, to Gray Television for $442.5 million. Gray already owns KAKE in Wichita; however, it will sell that station and keep KSCW and KWCH. The FCC approved the Schurz sale on February 12, 2016, and the sale was finalized on February 16.

== Programming ==
In 2024, KSCW parent company Gray Television reached an agreement to broadcast eight Oklahoma City Thunder games on the station.

=== Newscasts ===
KWCH presently produces 20 1/2 hours of locally produced newscasts each week for sister station KSCW (with 3 1/2 hours on weekdays and 1 1/2 hours each on Saturdays and Sundays); in addition, the station airs the agricultural news program AG AM in Kansas, which airs weekdays at 6 a.m.

In 2008, KWCH began producing a two-hour extension of its weekday morning newscast for KSCW, titled Eyewitness News This Morning on KSCW; the program competes against the national morning news programs seen on the "Big Three" networks. In October 2008, KWCH became the first television station in the Wichita market to begin broadcasting its local newscasts in high definition; the KSCW broadcast was included in the upgrade. Although not initially included in the change, KWCH upgraded its weather forecast segments to HD in March 2009. In 2010, that station added a half-hour Sunday evening newscast at 7 p.m. to KSCW, titled Eyewitness News Weekend.

On September 12, 2011, KWCH began producing half-hour newscasts at 4 p.m. weekdays and seven nights a week at 9 p.m. for KSCW; the latter production directly competed temporarily with another half-hour nightly newscast on Fox affiliate KSAS-TV that KWCH also produced since January 2004 through a separate news share agreement, which expired on December 31. In theory, KWCH could have simultaneously broadcast two 9 p.m. newscasts until the expiration of the agreement, because KSAS' newscast originated from a secondary set (designed by FX Group) at KWCH's studio facility; however on October 5, 2011, KSAS filed a lawsuit against KWCH in Sedgwick County District Court claiming that in violation of the news share agreement, KWCH began taping the KSAS newscasts in advance, while KWCH produced its newscast for KSCW live; District Judge Jeff Goering signed an order requiring KWCH to restore the live newscast on KSAS while the suit was pending.

After KWCH's agreement with KSAS ended, NBC affiliate KSNW took over the production of the KSAS newscasts (the station had previously produced a 9 p.m. newscast for KSAS from 1997 to 1999). The addition of the 4 p.m. newscast made KSCW one of the few CW affiliates not owned by Tribune Broadcasting to carry a late afternoon newscast, and was the only newscast in that timeslot in the Wichita market from September 2011 to September 2013, after ABC affiliate KAKE discontinued its own 4 p.m. newscast that same month. In September 2013, KSCW began airing a two-hour Sunday morning newscast, which airs on the station in lieu of KWCH (which carries a Saturday morning newscast).

== Technical information ==
=== Subchannels ===
KSCW-TV provides four subchannels, which are carried in ATSC 1.0 format on the multiplexes of some of the other stations participating in the ATSC 3.0 arrangement.

Subchannels provided by KSCW-DT (ATSC 1.0)
Subchannel	Res.	Short name	Programming	ATSC 1.0 host
33.1	1080i	KSCW-DT	The CW	KWCH-DT
33.2	480i	Catchy	Catchy Comedy	KWCH-DT
33.3	480i	THE365	365BLK	KAKE
33.4	480i	StartTV	Start TV	KPTS

Subchannels of KSCW-DT (ATSC 3.0)
Subchannel	Short name	Programming
8.1	KPTS HD	PBS (KPTS)
12.1	KWCH	CBS (KWCH-DT)
33.1	KSCW	The CW

On May 25, 2015, KSCW-DT began carrying the sitcom-oriented classic television network Decades (which became Catchy Comedy in 2023) on a newly created second subchannel at official launch date.

On January 16, 2017, Tribune Media made an agreement with Gray to carry Antenna TV on a new third subchannel for KSCW. The subchannel launched on March 1 the same year.

=== Analog-to-digital conversion ===
Because it was granted an original construction permit after the FCC finalized the digital television allotment plan on April 21, 1997, the station did not receive a companion channel for its digital signal. Instead, at the end of the digital conversion period for full-power television stations, KSCW was required to turn off its analog signal and turn on its digital signal (an action called a "flash-cut").

The station shut down its analog signal, over UHF channel 33, on February 17 of that year, the original target date on which full-power television stations in the United States were federally mandated to transition from analog to digital broadcasts (which was later pushed back to June 12). Digital television receivers display the station's virtual channel as its former UHF analog channel 33.
