= KUPK =

Television station in Garden City, Kansas

Semi-satellite of KAKE, Wichita, Kansas
- Garden City–Dodge City, Kansas; United States
- City: Garden City, Kansas
- Channels: Digital: 13 (VHF); Virtual: 13
- Branding: KAKE

Programming
- Network: KAKEland Television Network
- Affiliations: 13.1: ABC; for others, see § Subchannels

Ownership
- Owner: Lockwood Broadcast Group; (Knoxville TV LLC)

History
- First air date: October 28, 1964
- Former call signs: KUPK (1964–1965); KUPK-TV (1965–2010)
- Former channel numbers: Analog: 13 (VHF, 1964–2009); Digital: 18 (UHF, until 2009)
- Call sign meaning: Cupcake

Technical information
- Licensing authority: FCC
- Facility ID: 65535
- ERP: 63 kW
- HAAT: 262 m (860 ft)
- Transmitter coordinates: 37°39′1″N 100°40′8″W

Links
- Public license information: Public file; LMS
- Website: www.kake.com

KUPK (channel 13) is a television station licensed to Garden City, Kansas, United States, affiliated with ABC and owned by Lockwood Broadcast Group. The station's news bureau and advertising sales office are located on East Schulman Avenue in Garden City, and its transmitter is located near Copeland, Kansas.

KUPK is part of the KAKEland Television Network (KTN), a regional network of eight stations (three full-power, two low-power, two translators and one digital replacement translator) that relay programming from Wichita ABC affiliate KAKE (channel 10) across central and western Kansas; KUPK incorporates local advertising and news inserts aimed at areas of southwestern Kansas within the Wichita–Hutchinson Plus television market, as well as portions of the Oklahoma Panhandle within the Amarillo market.

== History ==
On October 28, 1964, KAKE signed on KUPK-TV to serve as a satellite station for southwestern Kansas. KUPK was named as its letters could be used to form the word "Kup-Kake". The studio was originally located at Copeland, where the main transmitter remains today.

In 1992, with local news inserts having expanded to 15 minutes inside KAKE's 6 and 10 p.m. newscasts, KAKE announced that a new regional news program for western Kansas, known as KTN West, would be launched to air on KUPK and KLBY in Colby.

Currently, the satellite stations air all KAKE newscasts in their entirety with no local inserts, but reporters can send in stories from western Kansas via KUPK's studio on the east side of Garden City.

== Subchannels ==
The station's signal is multiplexed:

Subchannels of KUPK
Subchannel	Res.	Short name	Programming
13.1	720p	KUPK	ABC
13.2	480i	MeTV	MeTV
13.3	480i	Bounce	Bounce TV
13.4	480i	ionPLUS	Ion Plus
13.5	480i	WXNow	Weather
