= KPTS =

Television station in Hutchinson, Kansas

- Hutchinson–Wichita, Kansas; United States
- City: Hutchinson, Kansas
- Channels: Digital: 8 (VHF); applied for 33 (UHF); Virtual: 8
- Branding: PBS Kansas Public Television (general); PBS Kansas (alternate)

Programming
- Affiliations: 8.1: PBS; for others, see § Subchannels

Ownership
- Owner: Kansas Public Telecommunications Service, Inc.

History
- First air date: January 5, 1970
- Former channel numbers: Analog: 8 (VHF, 1970–2009); Digital: 29 (UHF, 2003–2009)
- Former affiliations: NET (January–October 1970)
- Call sign meaning: Kansas Public Telecommunications Service

Technical information
- Licensing authority: FCC
- Facility ID: 33345
- ERP: 32 kW; 1,000 kW (application)
- HAAT: 244 m (801 ft)
- Transmitter coordinates: 38°3′21.4″N 97°46′36.1″W
- Translator(s): 17 (UHF) Wichita (city)

Links
- Public license information: Public file; LMS
- Website: www.kpts.org

KPTS (channel 8) is a PBS member television station licensed to Hutchinson, Kansas, United States, serving the Wichita area. It is owned by Kansas Public Telecommunications Service, Inc., a non-profit educational organization. KPTS' studios are located on East 32nd Street in northeastern Wichita.

The station broadcasts from two over-the-air transmitters—its main tower is located in northeastern Reno County (east of Hutchinson), and its signal is relayed on a fill-in low-power translator station on UHF channel 17 in south Park City for the Wichita metro area.

== History ==
KPTS logo used from 1997 to 2013.

In June 1965, the Garvey Foundation purchased a transmitter site in Hutchinson, with the intent to start a non-commercial educational television station. Shortly afterward, on July 21, 1965, the Sunflower Educational Television Corporation was chartered to start a public television station for the Wichita market. A year later, the SETC's board of trustees filed for a construction permit with the Federal Communications Commission (FCC) for a non-commercial educational license on VHF channel 8, which was eventually assigned KPTS as its call letters.

The station first signed on the air on January 5, 1970; for its first ten months on the air, it served as a member station of National Educational Television (NET), before becoming a member of PBS when it launched on October 5, 1970. In 1978, Sunflower Educational Television Corporation was reorganized as the Kansas Public Telecommunications Service. In 1980, the station moved to its second studio facility at 320 West 21st Street North in Wichita.

In January 2021, KPTS transitioned to a new name, PBS Kansas Public Television. The move highlights how PBS Kansas serves the majority of Kansas residents. The station moved to its current studio building on East 32nd Street North a year later.

== Technical information ==
=== Subchannels ===
The station's signal is multiplexed:

Subchannels of KPTS
Subchannel	Res.	Short name	Programming
8.1	1080i	KPTS-HD	PBS
8.2	720p	Explore	PBS Kansas Explore
8.3	480i	Create	PBS Kansas Create
8.4	480i	KPTSKID	PBS Kansas Kids 24/7
33.4	480i	StartTV	Start TV (KSCW)

Broadcast on behalf of another station

=== Analog-to-digital conversion ===
KPTS signed on its digital signal on channel 8 at 10 a.m. February 16, 2008. The station shut down its analog signal, over VHF channel 8, on January 5, 2009. One month later on February 18, the station's digital signal relocated from its pre-transition UHF channel 29 to VHF channel 8.

Due to reception problems that occurred after the transition due to the short height of its previous transmitter tower near Buhler and the fact that the transmitter operated at a lower power that limited the station's coverage area, resulting in signal loss issues—especially in areas of lower terrain located south and east of Wichita, KPTS began raising funds to sign on a fill-in translator from a tower north of Wichita in 2011. Plans called for construction on the tower to begin in the summer of 2013 with the translator signing on by September; however, these plans were delayed due to frequent occurrences of record rainfall during July and August. The translator began operating on November 8, 2013.
