= KAKE =

Television station in Wichita, Kansas

- Wichita, Kansas; United States
- Channels: Digital: 10 (VHF); Virtual: 10
- Branding: KAKE (pronounced "cake"); MeTV Kansas (10.2)

Programming
- Network: KAKEland Television Network
- Affiliations: 10.1: ABC; for others, see § Technical information and subchannels

Ownership
- Owner: Lockwood Broadcast Group; (Knoxville TV LLC)

History
- First air date: October 19, 1954
- Former call signs: KAKE-TV (1954–2010)
- Former channel numbers: Analog: 10 (VHF, 1954–2009); Digital: 21 (UHF, 2000–2009)
- Call sign meaning: The word "cake" (sic)

Technical information
- Licensing authority: FCC
- Facility ID: 65522
- ERP: 56.5 kW
- HAAT: 309.8 m (1,016 ft)
- Transmitter coordinates: 37°46′52.9″N 97°31′9.1″W
- Translator(s): see § Satellites and translators

Links
- Public license information: Public file; LMS
- Website: kake.com

KAKE (channel 10) is a television station in Wichita, Kansas, United States, affiliated with ABC and owned by Lockwood Broadcast Group. The station's studios are located on West Street in northwestern Wichita, and its transmitter is located in rural northwestern Sedgwick County (on the town limits of Colwich).

KAKE serves as the flagship of the KAKEland Television Network (KTN), a regional network of eight stations (three full-power, two low-power, two translators and one digital replacement translator) that relay ABC network shows and other programming provided by KAKE across central and western Kansas, as well as bordering counties in Colorado and Oklahoma. The station's distinctive call sign is pronounced as "cake", although it has been branded as "KAKEland"—after the aforementioned statewide relay network—since July 2011.

== History ==
The station first signed on the air on October 19, 1954, as KAKE-TV (the "-TV" suffix was dropped in 2010). The television station was started up by KAKE Broadcasting Company, owner of AM radio station KAKE (AM 1240, now KNSS at AM 1330). It has always been an ABC affiliate.

KAKE-TV and ABC programs were seen in the late 1950s and early 1960s on two additional stations in western Kansas: KTVC (channel 6) at Ensign, which signed on August 1, 1957, and KAYS-TV (channel 7) in Hays, which took to the air in 1958. The stations branded as the "Golden K Network". However, KAKE would lose both stations when they defected to CBS in 1961 and 1962. On October 28, 1964, KAKE signed on KUPK-TV (channel 13) in Garden City to serve as a satellite station for southwestern Kansas.

In 1978, KAKE received a letter from Dennis Rader, the "BTK" serial killer. He asked for the police to send him a hidden message. During an evening newscast, a subliminal message was broadcast on KAKE to convince Rader to turn himself in; the effort was unsuccessful. In 2004 and 2005, the BTK killer once again sent letters to KAKE – one included a word puzzle, while another expressed concern about the colds that anchors Susan Peters and Jeff Herndon had suffered at the time. Rader was eventually arrested and convicted of the murders.

In 1979, the station was sold to the San Francisco-based Chronicle Publishing Company, run by the de Young family, who also owned KRON-TV in San Francisco and WOWT in Omaha, Nebraska. In 1987, Chronicle purchased KLBY (channel 4) in Colby, an independent station that had ceased broadcasting in December 1985, and converted it into a satellite of KAKE. In 1988, KAKE moved all of its translators on UHF channels 70 to 83 (which were being phased out from broadcasting use) to other, lower channel positions; in addition, a few the affected translators were shut down outright.

On June 16, 1999, the deYoung family announced that it decided to liquidate Chronicle Publishing's assets. KAKE, its satellites, and WOWT were sold to LIN TV (KRON was later sold to Young Broadcasting, which became involved in a contract dispute with NBC, which had bid for the station, that led to KRON losing its NBC affiliation in January 2002). Almost as soon as the sale was finalized, LIN turned around and traded KAKE and WOWT to Benedek Broadcasting in a cash deal, in exchange for NBC affiliate WWLP in Springfield, Massachusetts. The acquisition of KAKE and WOWT could be seen as the ultimate undoing for the financially challenged Benedek, which in 2002 declared for Chapter 7 bankruptcy; the company then sold most of its stations, including KAKE and WOWT, to Atlanta-based Gray Television. Another translator shuffle occurred on August 15, 2003, as three of the station's low-power repeaters changed channel allocations: K20BU (channel 20) in Russell moved to channel 38 as K38GH, K22CP (channel 22, now KHDS-LD) in Salina moved to channel 51 as K51GC, and K69DQ (channel 69, now KGBD-LD) in Great Bend moved to channel 30 as K30GD.

On September 14, 2015, KAKE and its satellites were put up for sale, as Gray entered into a deal to acquire the broadcasting assets of Schurz Communications, including rival KWCH, a station that Gray intends to retain. On October 1, Gray announced that it would sell KAKE to Lockwood Broadcast Group, and in return receive WBXX-TV in Knoxville and $11.2 million. On January 1, 2016, Lockwood (through Knoxville TV LLC) took the operations of the stations via local marketing agreement. The sale was completed on February 1.

== News operation ==
KAKE presently broadcasts 34 hours of locally produced newscasts each week (with 5 1/2 hours each weekday, 3 1/2 hours on Saturdays and three hours on Sundays). For 30 years, KAKE was the highest-rated station in the Wichita–Hutchinson market, even though it did not build an extensive translator/satellite network in central and western Kansas until the 1980s. For most of the last quarter-century, it has been the second-place station in the Wichita–Hutchinson market.

In January 2011, KAKE expanded its weekday morning newscasts to 2 1/2 hours, with the addition of a half-hour at 4:30 am, becoming the first station in the Wichita–Hutchinson market to expand its morning newscast to a pre-5 a.m. timeslot. On July 17, 2011, beginning with its 5:30 p.m. newscast, KAKE became the second television station in the Wichita–Hutchinson market (after KWCH) to begin broadcasting its local newscasts in high definition (KSNW remained the only station in the market whose newscasts were not produced in HD, broadcasting them in widescreen enhanced definition until January 27, 2014, with weather segments only broadcasting in high definition prior to that). With the change, the station introduced a new graphics package, a custom news music package (composed by Aircast Custom Music), and a new station logo that emphasizes the long used "KAKEland" sub-branding for its network of satellite and repeater stations. When KAKE made the switch to HD, it also began using automated production for its newscasts. Like other Gray stations at the time, it used Ross OverDrive automation (still in use today). KAKE discontinued its half-hour 4 p.m. newscast in September 2011, due to a lack of a solid syndicated programming lead-out for the program. A 4 p.m. newscast returned to the schedule on September 9, 2013; later that week on September 15, KAKE debuted an hour-long Sunday morning newscast from 8 to 9 am.

In 2018, KAKE ended production of the political talk show This Week in Kansas and the Sunday night legal advice program Lawyer on the Line.

In October 2019, it was announced that KAKE would assume production of the 9 p.m. newscast for Fox-affiliated station KSAS-TV beginning on January 1, 2020, with Katie Taube assuming it as anchor; the newscast had been produced by KSNW.

=== Notable former on-air staff ===
- Jonathan Coachman – sports anchor/reporter, 1997–1999
- Steve Doocy – host of PM Magazine
- Tony Laubach – meteorologist (2018–2021)
- Susan Peters – anchor (1996–2016)

== Technical information and subchannels ==
KAKE's transmitter is located in rural northwestern Sedgwick County (on the town limits of Colwich). The station's signal is multiplexed:

Subchannels of KAKE
Subchannel	Res.	Short name	Programming
10.1	720p	KAKE-DT	ABC
10.2	480i	MeTV	MeTV (4:3)
10.3	480i	Bounce	Bounce TV
10.4	480i	ionPLUS	Ion Plus
10.5	480i	ShopLC	Shop LC
33.3	480i	THE365	365BLK (KSCW-DT)
36.4	480i	TCN	True Crime Network (KMTW)

Broadcast on behalf of another station

=== Analog-to-digital conversion ===
KAKE shut down its analog signal, over VHF channel 10, on February 17, 2009, the original target date on which full-power television stations in the United States were to transition from analog to digital broadcasts under federal mandate (which was later pushed back to June 12, 2009). The station's digital signal relocated from its pre-transition UHF channel 21 to VHF channel 10.

=== Satellites and translators ===
Satellites of KAKE
Station	City of license	Channel	First air date	ERP	HAAT	FID	Transmitter coordinates	Public license information
KUPK	Garden City	13 (13)	October 28, 1964	63 kW	262.4 m (861 ft)	65535	37°39′1″N 100°40′6″W	Public file
KLBY	Colby	4 (17)	July 4, 1984	625 kW	223 m (732 ft)	65523	39°15′9″N 101°21′9″W	Public file

Translators of KAKE
Call sign	City of license	Channel	ERP	HAAT	FID	Transmitter coordinates
KGBD-LD	Great Bend	30	15 kW	104 m (341 ft)	65534	38°24′22″N 98°43′20″W
KHDS-LD	Salina	29	15 kW	87 m (285 ft)	65527	38°50′27″N 97°40′8″W
K25CV-D	Hays	25	8.9 kW	72 m (236 ft)	65533	38°54′54″N 99°19′40″W
K33NP-D	Russell	33	7.2 kW	135 m (443 ft)	65529	38°54′51″N 98°51′52″W
KAKE (DRT)	Wichita	21	15 kW	309.8 m (1,016 ft)	65522	37°46′52.9″N 97°31′9.1″W

On February 9, 2010, KAKE filed an application to the FCC to operate a digital fill-in translator on its pre-transition digital allotment, UHF channel 21, to serve Wichita proper and surrounding areas located north and west of the city.
