= KLBY =

Television station in Colby, Kansas

Semi-satellite of KAKE, Wichita, Kansas
- Colby–Goodland, Kansas; United States
- City: Colby, Kansas
- Channels: Digital: 17 (UHF); Virtual: 4
- Branding: KAKE

Programming
- Network: KAKEland Television Network
- Affiliations: 4.1: ABC; for others, see § Subchannels

Ownership
- Owner: Lockwood Broadcast Group; (Knoxville TV LLC)

History
- Founded: February 9, 1983
- First air date: July 4, 1984
- Former call signs: KBOM (1983)
- Former channel numbers: Analog: 4 (VHF, 1984–2009)
- Former affiliations: Independent (1984–1985)
- Call sign meaning: Colby (sic)

Technical information
- Licensing authority: FCC
- Facility ID: 65523
- ERP: 400 kW
- HAAT: 223 m (732 ft)
- Transmitter coordinates: 39°15′9.4″N 101°21′10.2″W

Links
- Public license information: Public file; LMS
- Website: www.kake.com

KLBY (channel 4) is a television station licensed to Colby, Kansas, United States, affiliated with ABC and owned by Lockwood Broadcast Group. The station's transmitter is located near Brewster, Kansas.

KLBY is part of the KAKEland Television Network (KTN), a regional network of eight stations (three full-power, two low-power, two translators and one digital replacement translator) that relay programming from Wichita ABC affiliate KAKE (channel 10) across central and western Kansas; KLBY incorporates local advertising and news inserts aimed at areas of northwestern Kansas and southwestern Nebraska within the Wichita–Hutchinson Plus television market (including Goodland), as well as portions of east-central Colorado.

KLBY has been operated by KAKE as a semi-satellite since 1987. Prior to that, it was a local independent station for the Colby area from July 1984 to December 1985.

== History ==
Four Colby investors, including businessman Sam Lunsway, obtained a construction permit for a new television station to serve Colby on February 9, 1983. Initially bearing the call sign KBOM, the construction permit took the KLBY call letters on December 8, 1983. The original ownership of the station intended to operate KLBY as an ABC affiliate. Continual delays pushed back channel 4's launch throughout early 1984: bad weather at the end of late 1983 prevented the installation of the tower, while the original tower crew withdrew from the job after building all but the top 100 feet (30 m) after the spring brought more inclement conditions to the region.

KLBY finally began telecasting July 4, 1984. However, it was not able to land the ABC affiliation that owner Lunsway had said was still not approved in May. It operated as an independent station instead, including local news and programming for the northwest Kansas region. The studios were located in a former discount store building, though Lunsway planned to build a permanent facility for the station at a Sheraton hotel proposed to be built in town.

KLBY operated for less than 18 months. On December 26, 1985, KLBY went silent, and its owners, Channel 4 Broadcasting, Ltd., immediately announced that they were searching for a buyer for the television station. The availability of a signal in northwest Kansas attracted interest from Hays public television station KOOD, which sought to expand its reach; however, the Kansas Public Broadcasting Commission refused to cover the entirety of the $1.9 million asking price sought by Channel 4 Broadcasting, saying the station was overpriced.

In August 1986, KAKE purchased KLBY for $1.38 million to operate it as a satellite of the Wichita station; upon the announcement of the sale, owner Lunsway declared that his 20-year ambition to bring an ABC affiliate to northwest Kansas had finally succeeded. KLBY returned to air February 11, 1987.

Since becoming a satellite of KAKE, KLBY has aired little to no local programming outside of news. It initially aired some local news, only for KAKE to cut that back altogether not long after relaunch—making it the first in a series of local news cuts at western Kansas TV stations in the late 1980s. Some local news returned with 90-second inserts in 1990 hosted by station manager Wayne Roberts, in part to help KLBY sell advertising. Two years later, with the inserts having expanded to 15 minutes inside KAKE's 6 and 10 p.m. newscasts, KAKE announced that a new regional news program for western Kansas, known as KTN West, would be launched to air on KLBY and KUPK in Garden City.

Currently, KLBY airs KAKE's newscasts in their entirety with no local inserts. However, reporters can file stories from western Kansas at KUPK's studio in Garden City.

== Subchannels ==
The station's signal is multiplexed:

Subchannels of KLBY
Subchannel	Res.	Short name	Programming
4.1	720p	KLBY	ABC
4.2	480i	MeTV	MeTV
4.3	480i	Bounce	Bounce TV
4.4	480i	ionPLUS	Ion Plus
4.5	480i	SHOPLC	Shop LC
