= Ensign, Kansas =

City in Gray County, Kansas

- City
- Location within Gray County and Kansas

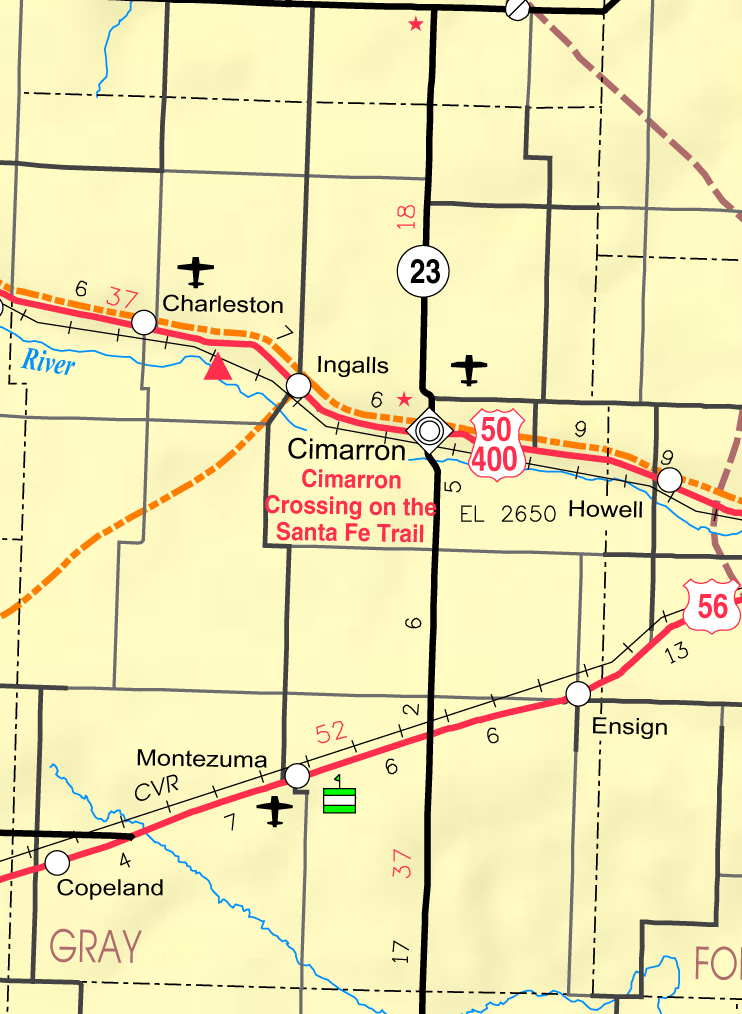
- KDOT map of Gray County (legend)
- Coordinates: 37°39′11″N 100°13′58″W
- Country: United States
- State: Kansas
- County: Gray
- Founded: 1880s
- Platted: 1886 (Lone Lake)
- Incorporated: 1929
- Named for: G.L. Ensign

Area
  - Total: 0.29 sq mi (0.75 km^{2})
  - Land: 0.29 sq mi (0.75 km^{2})
  - Water: 0 sq mi (0.00 km^{2})
- Elevation: 2,720 ft (830 m)

Population (2020)
  - Total: 166
  - Density: 570/sq mi (220/km^{2})
- Time zone: UTC-6 (CST)
  - Summer (DST): UTC-5 (CDT)
- ZIP Code: 67841
- Area code: 620
- FIPS code: 20-21400
- GNIS ID: 2394694
- Website: cityofensign.com

Ensign is a city in Gray County, Kansas, United States. As of the 2020 census, the population of the city was 166. It is located along U.S. Route 56 highway.

== History ==
Ensign was originally called Lone Lake, and under the latter name laid out about 1886. It was renamed Ensign in 1888 in honor of its founder, G. L. Ensign.

== Geography ==
According to the United States Census Bureau, the city has a total area of 0.29 square miles (0.75 km^{2}), all land.

== Demographics ==
Historical population
Census	Pop.	Note	%±
1930	244		—
1940	202		−17.2%
1950	227		12.4%
1960	255		12.3%
1970	237		−7.1%
1980	209		−11.8%
1990	192		−8.1%
2000	203		5.7%
2010	187		−7.9%
2020	166		−11.2%
U.S. Decennial Census

=== 2020 census ===
The 2020 United States census counted 166 people, 61 households, and 48 families in Ensign. The population density was 570.4 per square mile (220.2/km^{2}). There were 70 housing units at an average density of 240.5 per square mile (92.9/km^{2}). The racial makeup was 63.86% (106) white or European American (57.83% non-Hispanic white), 0.0% (0) black or African-American, 0.0% (0) Native American or Alaska Native, 0.0% (0) Asian, 0.0% (0) Pacific Islander or Native Hawaiian, 18.07% (30) from other races, and 18.07% (30) from two or more races. Hispanic or Latino of any race was 37.95% (63) of the population.

Of the 61 households, 36.1% had children under the age of 18; 60.7% were married couples living together; 21.3% had a female householder with no spouse or partner present. 21.3% of households consisted of individuals and 8.2% had someone living alone who was 65 years of age or older. The average household size was 1.9 and the average family size was 2.1. The percent of those with a bachelor's degree or higher was estimated to be 7.8% of the population.

23.5% of the population was under the age of 18, 11.4% from 18 to 24, 21.7% from 25 to 44, 21.1% from 45 to 64, and 22.3% who were 65 years of age or older. The median age was 39.0 years. For every 100 females, there were 95.3 males. For every 100 females ages 18 and older, there were 104.8 males.

The 2016–2020 5-year American Community Survey estimates show that the median household income was $58,333 (with a margin of error of +/- $17,626) and the median family income was $62,500 (+/- $31,265). Males had a median income of $45,179 (+/- $22,844) versus $30,500 (+/- $8,376) for females. The median income for those above 16 years old was $33,036 (+/- $9,058). Approximately, 0.0% of families and 3.3% of the population were below the poverty line, including 0.0% of those under the age of 18 and 4.3% of those ages 65 or over.

=== 2010 census ===
As of the census of 2010, there were 187 people, 76 households, and 52 families living in the city. The population density was 644.8 inhabitants per square mile (249.0/km^{2}). There were 86 housing units at an average density of 296.6 per square mile (114.5/km^{2}). The racial makeup of the city was 88.2% White, 1.6% African American, 1.6% Native American, 5.9% from other races, and 2.7% from two or more races. Hispanic or Latino of any race were 28.3% of the population.

There were 76 households, of which 27.6% had children under the age of 18 living with them, 56.6% were married couples living together, 7.9% had a female householder with no husband present, 3.9% had a male householder with no wife present, and 31.6% were non-families. 27.6% of all households were made up of individuals, and 14.5% had someone living alone who was 65 years of age or older. The average household size was 2.46 and the average family size was 3.02.

The median age in the city was 41.5 years. 24.1% of residents were under the age of 18; 8% were between the ages of 18 and 24; 21.9% were from 25 to 44; 32.6% were from 45 to 64; and 13.4% were 65 years of age or older. The gender makeup of the city was 48.1% male and 51.9% female.

== Economy ==
The Gray County Wind Farm near Ensign is the largest wind farm in Kansas.

== Education ==
The community is served by Cimarron–Ensign USD 102 public school district. Ensign had its own high school until 1984. The Ensign High School mascot was Ensign Wildcats.

== Notable people ==
- John Crutcher, former Lieutenant Governor of Kansas.
