= Mass media in Topeka, Kansas =

The following television and radio stations serve the city of Topeka, Kansas, and surrounding areas.

== Television ==
Topeka is the 133rd largest television media market in the United States (as ranked by Nielsen). The following is a list of television stations licensed to and/or broadcast from the city.

Display Channel	Network	Callsign	City of License	Notes
11.1	PBS	KTWU	Topeka, Kansas	-
11.2	World	KTWU	Topeka, Kansas	-
11.3	Enhance	KTWU	Topeka, Kansas	-
12.1	Country Network	KSQA	Topeka, Kansas	-
13.1	CBS	WIBW-TV	Topeka, Kansas	-
13.2	MyNetworkTV/Me-TV	WIBW-TV	Topeka, Kansas	-
13.3	Heroes & Icons	WIBW-TV	Topeka, Kansas	-
13.4	Start TV	WIBW-TV	Topeka, Kansas	-
13.5	365BLK	WIBW-TV	Topeka, Kansas	-
13.6	Outlaw	WIBW-TV	Topeka, Kansas	-
13.7	Oxygen	WIBW-TV	Topeka, Kansas	-
25.1	BUZZR	WROB-LD	Topeka, Kansas	-
25.2	AMG	WROB-LD	Topeka, Kansas	-
25.3	Ace TV	WROB-LD	Topeka, Kansas	-
25.4	Action Channel	WROB-LD	Topeka, Kansas	-
25.5	America's Voice	WROB-LD	Topeka, Kansas	-
25.6	Weather Nation	WROB-LD	Topeka, Kansas	-
25.7	Rev'N TV	WROB-LD	Topeka, Kansas	-
25.8	Retro TV	WROB-LD	Topeka, Kansas	-
25.9	Heartland	WROB-LD	Topeka, Kansas	-
25.10	Shop LC	WROB-LD	Topeka, Kansas	-
25.11	Newsmax2	WROB-LD	Topeka, Kansas	-
25.12	Jewelry Television	WROB-LD	Topeka, Kansas	-
27.1	NBC	KSNT	Topeka, Kansas	-
27.2	FOX	KSNT	Topeka, Kansas	Simulcast of KTMJ-CD
27.3	Ion	KSNT	Topeka, Kansas	
27-4	Bounce TV	KSNT	Topeka, Kansas	
40.1	GCN	K40IJ-D	Topeka, Kansas	-
43.1	FOX	KTMJ-CD	Topeka, Kansas	-
43.2	Mystery	KTMJ-CD	Topeka, Kansas	
43.3	Grit	KTMJ-CD	Topeka, Kansas	
43.4	Laff	KTMJ-CD	Topeka, Kansas	
49.1	ABC	KTKA-TV	Topeka, Kansas	-
49.2	Rewind TV	KTKA-TV	Topeka, Kansas	
49.3	CW	KTKA-TV	Topeka, Kansas	
49.4	Antenna TV	KTKA-TV	Topeka, Kansas	

According to Arbitron, the following Kansas counties are part of Topeka's DMA: Brown, Clay, Cloud, Coffey, Geary, Jackson, Jefferson, Lyon, Marshall, Morris, Nemaha, Osage, Pottawatomie, Riley, Shawnee, Wabaunsee, Washington,

== Radio ==
Topeka is the 194th largest radio market (as determined by Arbitron). Several radio stations cover the Topeka area, including:

=== FM radio ===
Frequency	Callsign	Nickname	Format	Owner	City of License	Web site
88.1	KJTY	88.1 Family Life Radio	Christian	Family Life Communications	Topeka, KS	
90.3	KBUZ		Contemporary Christian Simulcast	American Family Association	Topeka, KS	
91.5	KANU	Kansas Public Radio	NPR	University of Kansas	Lawrence, KS	
92.5	KCVT		Religion	Bott Radio	Silver Lake, KS	
92.9	KMXN	92.9 The Bull	Country	Great Plains Media	Osage City, KS	
94.5	WIBW	94-Country	Country	Alpha Media	Topeka, KS	
95.7	KCHZ	95-7 The Vibe	Top-40/CHR	Cumulus Broadcasting	Ottawa, KS	
96.5	KFNZ-FM	The Fan	Sports	Audacy Kansas City	Mission, KS	
96.9	KQRB	The Beat	Urban Contemporary	Intrepid Companies, LLC	Effingham, KS	
98.5	KSAJ-FM	Jack FM	Variety Hits	Alpha Media	Burlingame, KS	
98.9	KQRC-FM	The Rock	Active Rock	Audacy Kansas City	Mission, KS	
99.3	KWIC-FM	The Eagle	Classic Rock	Cumulus Broadcasting	Topeka, KS	
100.3	KDVV	V100	Classic/Active Rock	Cumulus Broadcasting	Topeka, KS	
102.9	KTOP-FM	102.9 Nash Icon	Country	Cumulus Broadcasting	St. Marys, KS	
105.5	KKJO	K-Jo 105-5	Hot AC	Eagle Radio Inc	St. Joseph, MO	
105.9	KKSW	105.9 Kiss-FM	Top-40/CHR	Great Plains Media	Lawrence, KS	
106.9	KTPK	Country Legends 106.9	Classic Country	Alpha Media	Topeka, KS	
107.7	KMAJ	Majic 107.7	Adult Contemporary	Cumulus Broadcasting	Shawnee, KS^{1}	

^{1} KMAJ has a construction permit to construct a new tower in Shawnee. Upon completion, Majic 107.7 will broadcast from there instead of Topeka, the current city of license.

=== AM radio ===
Frequency	Callsign	Nickname	Format	Owner	City of License	Web site
580	WIBW		News/Sports/Talk	Morris Communications	Topeka, KS	
610	KCSP	610 Sports	Sports/Sports Talk	Audacy, Inc.	Kansas City, MO	
680	KFEQ		News/Talk	Eagle Radio	St. Joseph, MO	
710	KCMO	Fox News & Talk Radio	Talk	Susquehanna Radio	Kansas City, MO	
810	WHB	Sports Radio	Sports/Sports Talk	Union Broadcasting	Kansas City, MO	
980	KMBZ	News Radio	News/Talk	Audacy, Inc.	Kansas City, MO	
1250	KKHK	La Super X	Español	Audacy, Inc.	Kansas City, KS	
1440	KMAJ		News/Talk/Sports	Cumulus Broadcasting	Topeka, KS	
1490	KTOP	K-Top	ESPN SPORTS	Cumulus Broadcasting	Topeka, KS	

=== Market overlap ===
Several more stations from the Kansas City metropolitan area broadcast into Topeka. Most of Kansas City's stations are among those gauged in Aribtron's semi-annual surveys.

Many Topeka stations also penetrate into the eastern counties of the Wichita media market, notably Saline County, which contains Salina, and the counties around Salina.
