= WIBW =

WIBW may refer to:

- WIBW (AM), a news and sports talk radio station (580 kHz) licensed to Topeka, Kansas, United States
- WIBW-FM, a country radio station (94.5 MHz FM) licensed to Topeka, Kansas, United States
- WIBW-TV, a television station affiliated with CBS (digital or PSIP channel 13) licensed to Topeka, Kansas, United States
