= KTKA-TV =

Television station in Topeka, Kansas

- Topeka, Kansas; United States
- Channels: Digital: 16 (UHF); Virtual: 49
- Branding: KTKA; 27 News; Northeast Kansas CW (49.3)

Programming
- Affiliations: 49.1: ABC; 49.3: CW+; for others, see § Subchannels

Ownership
- Owner: Vaughan Media; (KTKA Television, LLC)
- Operator: Nexstar Media Group
- Sister stations: KSNT, KTMJ-CD

History
- First air date: June 20, 1983
- Former call signs: KLDH (1983–1987)
- Former channel numbers: Analog: 49 (UHF, 1983–2009); Digital: 48 (UHF, 2003–2010), 49 (UHF, 2010–2020)
- Former affiliations: Fox (secondary, 1994–1996)
- Call sign meaning: Kansas Topeka

Technical information
- Licensing authority: FCC
- Facility ID: 49397
- ERP: 150 kW
- HAAT: 448.2 m (1,470 ft)
- Transmitter coordinates: 39°1′34″N 95°55′2″W

Links
- Public license information: Public file; LMS
- Website: www.ksnt.com

KTKA-TV (channel 49) is a television station in Topeka, Kansas, United States, affiliated with ABC and The CW Plus. It is owned by Vaughan Media and operated by Nexstar Media Group alongside NBC affiliate KSNT (channel 27) and Fox affiliate KTMJ-CD (channel 43). The three stations share studios on Northwest 25th Street (US 24), near the unincorporated community of Kiro (with a Topeka mailing address); KTKA-TV's transmitter is located along West Union Road west of Topeka.

Channel 49 began broadcasting as KLDH on June 20, 1983. It brought Topeka its first full local ABC affiliate. Owned by Mid America Broadcasting of Topeka, the station suffered two major setbacks within a year of signing on. A dispute among stockholders restricted cash and led to a filing for bankruptcy reorganization; in March 1984, one of the worst ice storms in Kansas history felled its tower, leading to major layoffs and financial difficulties as well as the cancellation of all newscasts. Larry D. Hudson, the original majority owner and namesake, acquired the station out of bankruptcy in 1985 and sold it to the Brechner family in 1986. The new owners renamed the station KTKA-TV and reinstated local news programming. The news department never rose above third place in the ratings and was discontinued in April 2002 due to low ratings and falling revenues.

Free State Communications—a subsidiary of the World Company, publisher of the Lawrence Journal-World newspaper—purchased KTKA-TV from the Brechners in 2005. A new news department was started for the station, which lasted until it was sold and entered into the agreement with KSNT in 2011. KSNT's news department was combined with KTKA's to produce newscasts for both stations.

== KLDH: Early history ==
=== Permitting and construction ===
As early as the mid-1960s, several groups analyzed applying for one of Topeka's two unused UHF channels, 43 and 49. Topeka Television, Inc., had applied for channel 43 and sold a stake to Starr Broadcasting, but its application was denied by a Federal Communications Commission (FCC) hearing examiner on financial grounds in October 1967. The Kansas State Network had submitted and withdrawn earlier that year an application for channel 49. In 1976, KQTV of St. Joseph, Missouri, an ABC affiliate, filed to start a semi-satellite on channel 43 in Topeka. This application was opposed by Topeka's second station, KTSB (channel 27), who felt that Topeka was too large under FCC policy for this kind of partial-service station. The FCC moved to dismiss the application in May 1978 on the grounds that the channel 43 facility and KQTV had impermissible signal overlap.

Capcom, a limited partnership containing about 20 investors mostly from Kansas including Gale Sayers, applied in late 1979 to the FCC for channel 49. The lead investor was Gerald Paul Smeyak, whose interest had been piqued by a prior application for channel 43 and by the ability of Topeka to support a third commercial station. On May 14, 1980, a second application for channel 49 was filed at the FCC by Mid America Broadcasting of Topeka, a consortium of five Kansas investors including former state senator Cale Hudson and his brother Larry, a cable system owner.

On November 13, 1981, Capcom formally withdrew, and the FCC issued Mid America Broadcasting a construction permit. The investors made substantial progress toward constructing the station in late 1982, including obtaining industrial revenue bonds from the city of Topeka, receiving approval for their tower site in Shawnee County, and leasing a building at 1st and Monroe streets.

KLDH-TV began broadcasting June 20, 1983, as an affiliate of ABC. Select ABC programs had been split between CBS affiliate WIBW-TV (channel 13) and NBC affiliate KTSB, but WIBW had not aired any ABC sporting events since January 1982 in deference to increasing offerings from its primary network. Channel 49's launch marked the first time that many non-cable households in the region had access to the full network lineup. The station had 55 staff members and debuted with 6 and 10 p.m. local newscasts. General manager Jim Thompson hoped that, with three local outlets, viewing of Topeka stations in outer counties in the region would increase, potentially adding households to the Topeka market.

=== Bankruptcy and tower collapse ===
Months after going on the air, a dispute among shareholders in Mid America Broadcasting of Kansas erupted. In state court in Chanute, the four minority stockholders—including Cale Hudson—sued Larry D. Hudson and the secretary-treasurer in the firm in an effort to prevent them from issuing more stock and thus diluting their interests. Because of the dispute tying up the company's liquidity, on November 18, 1983—less than five months after starting—the company filed for Chapter 11 bankruptcy reorganization.

While this matter was pending, a second setback befell KLDH. On March 19, 1984, Topeka was hit with what was described as one of its worst ice storms in recent years; a later ranking by the National Weather Service in Wichita placed it fourth-worst of all time behind three events in the 2000s. The station's 1,439-foot (439 m) mast collapsed under the weight of two inches (five centimeters) of ice, buckling within the lower 100-foot (30 m) stretch. The station did not return to the air until April 15, when it was able to put out a reduced-power signal from a temporary tower. By then, the damage had been done. KLDH laid off half its staff, including the entire news team. Most of the news employees took new jobs at stations from Fairbanks, Alaska, to Fort Wayne, Indiana.

The loss of the tower and of revenue from broadcasting commercials was a financial blow to KLDH. By early April, Mid America Broadcasting had only $8,000 in cash reserves and had to receive approval for access to cash from the bankruptcy judge. After warnings that a liquidation may be necessary, in May, a trustee was appointed to oversee the struggling station's affairs. David Segal, a retired broadcast executive, was authorized by the bankruptcy court to take offers for KLDH and received at least five bids. Some bidders shied away from the station because of its issues. Chronicle Broadcasting, owner of KAKE-TV—the ABC affiliate in Wichita—did due diligence and passed. Ron Loewen, KAKE's general manager, believed the $6 million valuation being sought was too high given KLDH's indebtedness and competitive standing. It had to fight for viewers and advertisers against the dominant WIBW-TV and the Kansas City stations (Kansas City ABC affiliate KMBC-TV was on Topeka cable as late as 2013). Additionally, Topeka was a slower-growth area, and KLDH had few assets eligible to be written off.

The sole bidder to present an offer was none other than Larry D. Hudson, who conditioned a purchase on dismissal of the various lawsuits against the station. The bankruptcy court approved the sale to Hudson in November 1984, at the same time that construction on the replacement tower was completed. Its losses during the time it was in bankruptcy averaged $130,000 a month and totaled $1.5 million for 1984. Hudson took control of the station in February 1985.

== KTKA: Brechner ownership ==
Larry Hudson agreed in March 1986 to sell KLDH to Joseph Brechner, the owner of WMDT in Salisbury, Maryland, and former owner of WFTV in Orlando, Florida. Brechner saw a station that, while dealt multiple setbacks, had opportunity to grow.

The sale took effect on May 1, and Brechner wasted little time in making major changes. Citing a lack of attachment by the community to the KLDH designation, the station changed its call sign to KTKA-TV, for Topeka, on August 13, 1986. At a chamber of commerce meeting, Joseph Brechner announced the station would return to producing newscasts. Bob Totten, who had been the news director for the original news operation, returned to Topeka to helm the revived news department. 49 Eyewitness News began airing at 10 p.m. nightly on January 5, 1987. An early newscast at 5 p.m. debuted on June 1, moving to 6 p.m. and then back to 5 p.m. in 1991. The news department was rebranded as News Source 49 in May 1995 and expanded with a third evening newscast, at 6 p.m., in 1996.

Between 1994 and 1996, KTKA-TV served as the Topeka-market outlet for the NFL on Fox, as Fox lacked a local affiliate. Topeka got a Fox affiliate of its own on April 1, 1996, when KTMJ-LP affiliated with the network, taking with it the rights to Fox sports events.

Brechner expanded his Topeka media holdings by purchasing radio station KTPK (106.9 FM) from Twenty-First Century Broadcasting in 1997. By then, planning was under way for new studio facilities on 21st Street and Chelsea Drive on Topeka's southwest side; the $4.5 million building opened in 1998 and provided the station with new, digital-ready equipment. KTPK moved into the facility the next year.

=== Second news department discontinuation ===
While KTKA-TV had slowly increased its newscast ratings since restarting local news production in 1987, the station had remained in third place behind WIBW-TV and KSNT. Revenues were strong as late as 2000, but the station operated at a loss because of its news department. In 2001, revenue declined 25 percent, and the first quarter of 2002 was lower than that. With declining advertising sales, digital equipment costs, and reduced affiliate compensation from the ABC network, the Brechner family opted to discontinue KTKA's newscasts on April 19, 2002, causing the layoffs of nine full-time and 17 part-time staffers. KTKA-TV was one of several stations, including four ABC affiliates, to cease producing local news in late 2001 and early 2002.

The station replaced its weekday morning and 10 p.m. newscasts with syndicated programming and introduced a new early evening community affairs program, Talk of the Town. Hosted by former WIBW-AM-FM radio host Betty Lou Pardue, Talk of the Town featured a mix of interviews, community events, sports, weather, and entertainment segments. This replacement rated poorly and was discontinued on July 11, 2003, resulting in the layoffs of six full-time and two part-time employees and the reassignment of two other production employees to channel 49's promotion and marketing department. Locally produced weather updates were dropped on July 31, when the contract of meteorologist Dave Relihan was not renewed.

== Free State Communications ownership and return to local news ==
In 2005, the Brechners sold off their Topeka media holdings. In January, JMJ Broadcasting Co. purchased KTPK for $5.7 million. That May, KTKA-TV was sold to Lawrence-based Free State Communications—an indirect subsidiary of the World Company, publisher of the Lawrence Journal-World and owner of Lawrence cable television provider Sunflower Broadband—for $6.2 million. Among those who considered buying KTKA included Bill Kurtis, who began his career in television journalism as a reporter for WIBW-TV in the 1960s and who at the time was considering purchasing a broadcast television outlet in Topeka; Kurtis, upon further consideration, decided against purchasing channel 49.

Free State restored KTKA-TV's news department, hiring 29 staffers and acquiring new equipment. On February 5, 2006, following ABC's telecast of Super Bowl XL and a post-game episode of Grey's Anatomy, KTKA debuted 49 News with a half-hour nightly late-evening newscast at 10 p.m. The next day, KTKA debuted a 90-minute morning newscast (starting at 5:30 a.m. weekdays) titled Good Morning Kansas and a half-hour early-evening newscast at 6 p.m. on Monday through Saturday evenings. The newscasts also benefited from the resources of 6 News Lawrence, which the World Company owned. Free State heavily invested in weather coverage, installing a network of tower cameras in cities such as Emporia, Junction City, and Manhattan and acquiring and modifying a Hummer H2 for storm chasing.

In July 2008, Free State put KTKA-TV on the market, citing a challenging media environment. It removed the station from sale consideration in October 2008, citing a crunch in the credit markets at the onset of the Great Recession, and restructured management, dismissing the general manager. The next month, KTKA-TV canceled its weekday morning and midday newscasts as part of budget cuts that resulted in the layoffs of nine employees.

== Joint operation with KSNT and KTMJ-CA ==
On February 4, 2011, Free State Communications announced that it would sell KTKA to Los Angeles–based PBC Broadcasting, owned by Todd Parkin, for $1.5 million. As part of the deal, KSNT owner New Vision Television, which already maintained shared services and local marketing agreements with PBC-owned stations in Youngstown, Ohio (WYTV), and Savannah, Georgia (WTGS), operated KTKA-TV under a local marketing agreement. Despite objections to the sale by the American Cable Association, who alleged the sale could give the virtual triopoly involving KSNT, KTKA and KTMJ-CA too much leverage in negotiations for retransmission consent agreements, the Federal Communications Commission (FCC) approved the sale on July 21, 2011.

With the agreement, KSNT took over production of KTKA's newscasts from its facilities, using existing staff from both stations. Weekday evening anchor Ben Bauman and chief meteorologist Matt Miller were among the KTKA staffers that joined the new joint operation. The station aired its final in-house newscast on July 29, 2011, with that evening's 10 p.m. newscast; KSNT started producing channel 49's newscasts the following day under the uniform branding Kansas First News, with the two stations initially simulcasting newscasts on weekday mornings and at 6 and 10 p.m. In 2012, LIN TV acquired the New Vision stations and their shared services agreements for $330.4 million and the assumption of $12 million in debt; simultaneously, Vaughan Media purchased the PBC stations. LIN and Vaughan also entered into a joint sales agreement to provide advertising services for KTKA. The sale of New Vision to LIN Media and KTKA's purchase by Vaughan Media received FCC approval and closed on October 12, 2012.

On March 21, 2014, Media General announced that it would purchase the LIN Media stations, including KSNT, KTMJ-CD, and the SSA/JSA with KTKA-TV, in a $1.6 billion merger. The FCC approved the merger on December 12, 2014, with the deal being consummated on December 19; as a condition of the sale's approval, Media General was originally required to terminate the joint sales agreement between KTKA-TV and KSNT within two years, due to the FCC's ban on agreements involving the sale of advertising encompassing more than 15% of a separately owned station's airtime. Media General merged with Nexstar Broadcasting Group in 2017.

== Notable former on-air staff ==
- Tim Joyce – meteorologist

== Technical information ==
=== Subchannels ===
KTKA-TV's transmitter is located along West Union Road west of Topeka. The station's signal is multiplexed:

Subchannels of KTKA-TV
Subchannel	Res.	Short name	Programming
49.1	720p	KTKA	ABC
49.2	480i	COZI	Cozi TV
49.3	720p	CW	The CW Plus
49.4	480i	Ant TV	Antenna TV (4:3)
49.5	480i	GREAT	Great

=== Analog-to-digital conversion ===
KTKA-TV shut down its analog signal, over UHF channel 49, at 12:01 a.m. on February 17, 2009, the original target date on which full-power television stations in the United States were to transition from analog to digital broadcasts under federal mandate (which was later pushed back to June 12, 2009). The station's digital signal remained on its pre-transition UHF channel 48, using virtual channel 49.

KTKA-TV relocated its signal from channel 49 to channel 16 on July 3, 2020, as a result of the 2016 United States wireless spectrum auction. A new 1,433-foot (437 m) tower for KTKA-TV and KTMJ-CA was completed in September 2020.
