= KSAJ-FM =

Radio station in Burlingame, Kansas

- Burlingame, Kansas; United States
- Broadcast area: Topeka metropolitan area
- Frequency: 98.5 MHz
- Branding: 98.5 Jack FM

Programming
- Format: Adult hits
- Affiliations: Jack FM network

Ownership
- Owner: Connoisseur Media; (Alpha Media Licensee LLC)
- Sister stations: KTPK; WIBW; WIBW-FM

History
- First air date: December 10, 1968; 57 years ago (as KABI-FM Abilene at 98.3)
- Former call signs: KABI-FM (1968–1985)
- Former frequencies: 98.3 MHz (1968–1985)
- Call sign meaning: Salina-Abilene-Junction City

Technical information
- Licensing authority: FCC
- Facility ID: 18055
- Class: C2
- ERP: 17,500 watts
- HAAT: 256 meters (840 ft)
- Transmitter coordinates: 38°47′50.00552″N 97°13′2.07749″W

Links
- Public license information: Public file; LMS
- Webcast: Listen live; Listen live (via iHeartRadio)
- Website: www.985jackfm.com

KSAJ-FM (98.5 MHz) is a commercial FM radio station licensed to Burlingame, Kansas, and serving the Topeka metropolitan area. It is owned by Connoisseur Media. The station airs an adult hits radio format, using the national "Jack FM" music service. The studios are on Executive Drive in Topeka.

KSAJ-FM has an effective radiated power (ERP) of 17,500 watts. The transmitter is off SW Wanamaker Road near SW 4th Street in Topeka.

== History ==
=== KABI-FM ===
The station signed on the air as KABI-FM on December 10, 1968. It was originally on 98.3 MHz, a Class A station only powered at 3,000 watts. Its city of license was Abilene. During this time, KABI-FM simulcast with KABI (1560 AM), which had gone on the air five years earlier. KABI was a daytimer, so KABI-FM continued its programming after sunset.

On April 1, 1985, the frequency was changed to 98.5 MHz. That was accompanied by an increase in power to 100,000 watts (ERP), and a physical move of the transmitter site from northwest Abilene to about 10 miles south of Abilene, east of K-15 on 1400 Avenue in rural Dickinson County.

=== Oldies ===
The call sign was switched to KSAJ-FM (for "Salina-Abilene-Junction City, Kansas" – the primary cities of its coverage area). Also on April 1, 1985, sister station KABI changed its call letters to KSAJ. The two stations simulcast programming for about two more years.

In 1987, KSAJ (AM) returned to being KABI with separate programming. Meanwhile, KSAJ-FM began airing an oldies format, using ABC Radio Networks' "Good Time Oldies" satellite feed before switching to The True Oldies Channel, then switched back to Good Time Oldies in 2014.

=== Ownership changes ===
In late 1991, KSAJ-FM and KABI were sold by broadcaster Norton Warner of Lincoln, Nebraska, to J.K. Vanier and Jerry Hinrikus of Salina, who later sold them to MCC Radio (Morris Communications) in January 2004. Then, on September 1, 2015, Alpha Media acquired the stations.

In October 2016, Alpha sold the company's Salina cluster (which KSAJ-FM was a part of) to Manhattan-based Rocking M Media. However, KSAJ-FM was retained by Alpha, who announced plans to move the station into the Topeka market (with the process beginning in the late 1990s) and join it with WIBW and WIBW-FM, and KTPK. In February 2017, after the closing of the Salina cluster's sale to Rocking M, Alpha moved the KSAJ-FM studios from Abilene to Topeka. Initially, the station planned to relocate their transmitter to the tower of WIBW-FM and WIBW-TV, located west of Topeka in rural Wabaunsee County, and reduce their power output to 69,000 watts. However, due to co-channel interference concerns with KQKQ-FM in the Omaha-Council Bluffs market, KSAJ-FM changed transmitter sites, first to the site of WIBW (and reduced power to 25,000 watts), and then to the KTWU-TV/KWIC/KTOP-FM tower in northwest Topeka, and reduced power even further to 17,500 watts.

=== Jack FM ===
At 6 p.m. on November 10, 2017, KSAJ-FM shut down its Dickinson County transmitter, signed on their new Topeka transmitter, and began stunting with Christmas music as "Christmas 98.5". With the move, KSAJ-FM changed its city of license to Burlingame.

At midnight on December 26, KSAJ-FM debuted its new adult hits format as "98.5 Jack FM". KSAJ airs programming from the Jack FM national feed, which uses no DJs.

In May 2025, Connoisseur Media announced its intent to acquire Alpha Media. The FCC approved the sale on August 13, 2025, and the sale was consummated on September 4.
