= Stauffer Communications =

American media corporation

Stauffer Communications was a privately held media corporation based in Topeka, Kansas, United States. It owned many publications and broadcast outlets, including The Topeka Capital-Journal and WIBW, WIBW-FM, and WIBW-TV. The company operated from 1930 to 1995.

== History ==
The company was founded by Oscar S. Stauffer in 1930 as Stauffer Publications. Oscar Stauffer had started a journalism career at the Emporia Gazette and Kansas City Star, and in 1915 had become the publisher of the Peabody Gazette-Herald in Peabody, Kansas, until 1922. When Stauffer died at age 95 in 1982, the company had grown to include 31 newspapers and broadcast companies in 11 states. Oscar Stauffer's son John H. Stauffer became head of the company in 1992.

In 1994, the company arranged to sell its properties to Morris Communications of Augusta, Georgia. The transaction was completed in 1995 for $275 million. At the time of its sale, Stauffer's multi-state operations included 20 daily newspapers, 11 radio stations, 3 magazines, and the broadcast rights to Kansas City Royals baseball. As a condition of the sale, Morris had to sell Stauffer's television holdings. Most of the former Stauffer television holdings, including WIBW-TV, were sold to Benedek Broadcasting in 1996. Morris also sold off all of Stauffer's magazines and its insurance and alarm operations.

Mary Stauffer Brownback, daughter of John Stauffer and granddaughter of Oscar Stauffer, is married to former U.S. Senator and Kansas Governor Sam Brownback.

== Properties ==
=== Newspapers ===
Colorado

Glenwood Post (Glenwood Springs CO)

==== Florida ====
- News Chief (Florida)

==== Kansas ====
- Grit (national)
- The Newton Kansan (Kansas)
- The Topeka Capital-Journal (Kansas)
- Dodge City Daily Globe (Kansas)
- The Morning Sun (Kansas)
- The Arkansas City Traveler (Kansas)
- Peabody Gazette-Bulletin (Kansas)

==== Michigan ====
- The Holland Sentinel (Michigan)
- Hillsdale Daily News (Michigan)

==== Minnesota ====
- Brainerd Dispatch (Minnesota)

==== Missouri ====
- The Examiner (Missouri)
- Maryville Daily Forum (Missouri)
- Hannibal Courier-Post (Missouri)

==== Nebraska ====
- The Grand Island Independent (Nebraska)
- York News-Times (Nebraska)
- Beatrice Daily Sun (Nebraska)

==== Oklahoma ====
- The Shawnee News-Star (Oklahoma)
- The Ardmoreite (Oklahoma)

==== South Dakota ====
- The Brookings Register (South Dakota)
- Yankton Daily Press & Dakotan (South Dakota)

==== Tennessee ====
- The Oak Ridger (Tennessee)

=== Radio ===
- KRNT (Iowa)
- KRNQ-FM (Iowa)

=== Television ===
- KGWN-TV, Cheyenne, Wyoming
- KMIZ, Columbia, Missouri
- WIBW-TV, Topeka
- KCOY-TV, Santa Maria, California
- KGNC-TV, Amarillo, Texas
- KGWC-TV, Casper, Wyoming
