= The Grand Island Independent =

Daily American newspaper

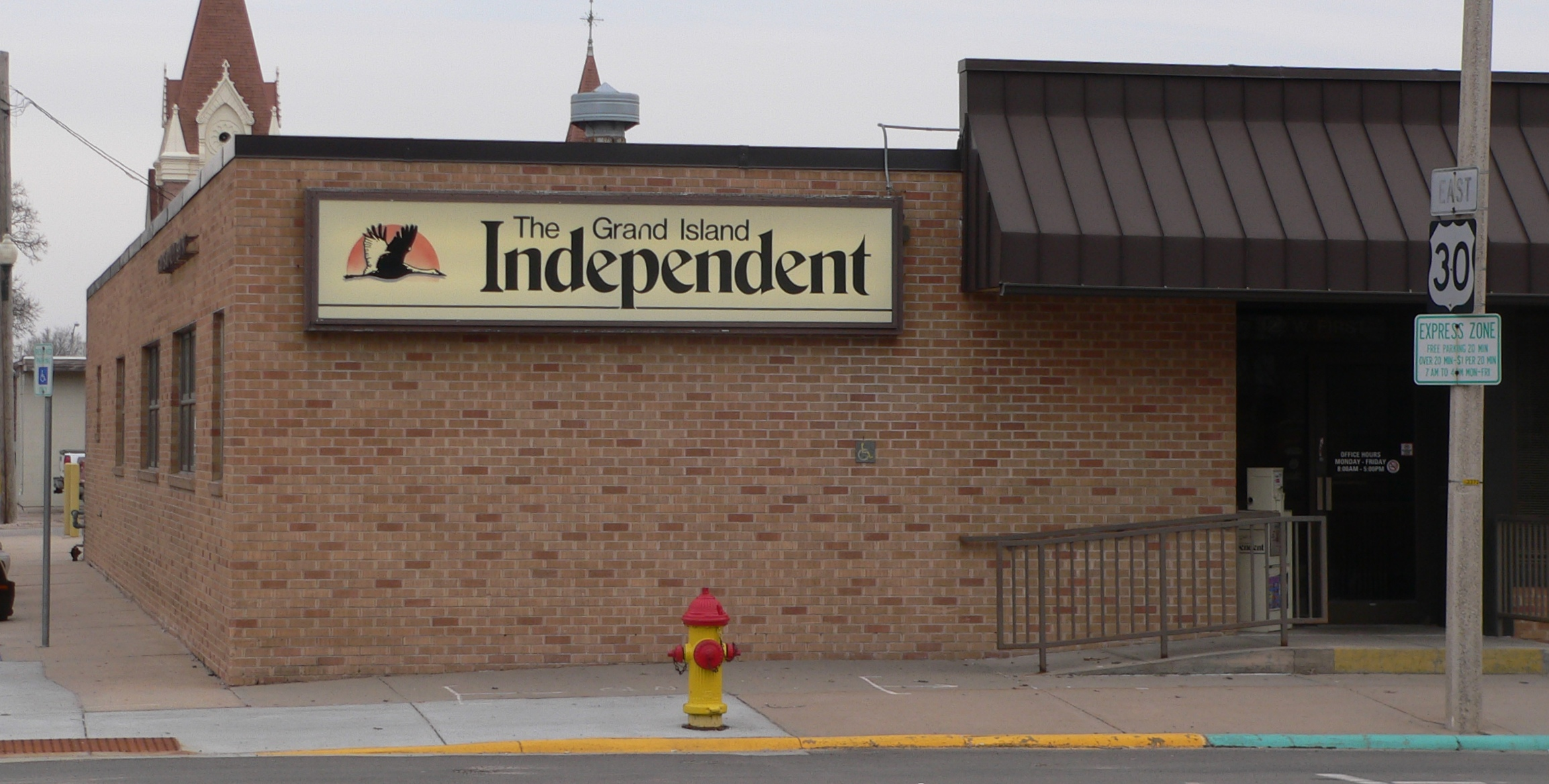
- Grand Island Independent building in Grand Island
- Type: Daily newspaper
- Format: Broadsheet
- Owner: Lee Enterprises
- Publisher: Terrie Baker
- Editor: Bette Pore
- Founded: July 2, 1870; 155 years ago
- Language: English
- Headquarters: 422 West First Street; Grand Island, Nebraska 68801
- Country: United States
- Circulation: 8,063 Daily (as of 2023)
- ISSN: 1049-3018
- OCLC number: 21212650
- Website: theindependent.com

The Grand Island Independent is a daily newspaper published in Grand Island, Nebraska.

== History ==
In 1869, Maggie Eberhart and Seth Mobley founded the Platte Valley Independent in North Platte. Eberhart, whose parents had immigrated from Ireland in her infancy, had been a teacher; Mobley had begun working in a newspaper office in Iowa at the age of 10, and had briefly published the Fort Kearney Herald, while stationed at Fort Kearny, Nebraska in 1865. In 1870, Eberhart moved the Independent to Grand Island and started publishing on July 2; she married Mobley the following year. The newspaper, described as "decidedly Republican", was published daily for a short time in late 1873, in connection with a political campaign of that year, but resumed weekly publication after the election.

In 1883, the Mobleys, who had alienated most of their advertisers, sold the newspaper to J. A. McMurphy; a week later, McMurphy sold it to Friedrich (Fred) Hedde. Hedde had been a lawyer and journalist in his native Holstein. After immigrating to the United States in 1854, he was one of the original settlers of Grand Island in 1857. He had served as County Judge and as a member of the Nebraska Territorial Legislature. Beside the Independent, he owned a lumberyard and a general store. Hedde converted the Independent from a weekly to a daily in 1884; in 1885, he changed its name to the Grand Island Daily Independent.

In 1900, the octogenarian Hedde's health was failing, prompting him to turn the newspaper over to a group of Grand Island businessmen, who formed the Independent Publishing Company. A. F. Buechler served as president of the company and editor of the newspaper until 1930, when it was sold to Oscar S. Stauffer; he continued as editor until 1939.

Stauffer Communications owned the Independent from 1930 to 1994. In 1974, the newspaper made the conversion from letterpress to offset printing. In 1979, it began printing a Sunday edition, initiating seven-day publication. In 1989, the "Daily" was dropped, leaving the newspaper with its present name.

The newspaper was acquired by the Morris Publishing Group in the course of their 1995 purchase of Stauffer. It introduced its website in 1996. In 2007, the Independent was bought by GateHouse Media. in 2008, GateHouse sold the newspaper to the Omaha World-Herald Co, which was acquired a year later by Berkshire Hathaway.

On Jan 29, 2020, Berkshire sold all of its newspapers, including The Grand Island Independent, to Lee Enterprises. Starting July 18, 2023, the paper will print five days a week, Tuesday through Saturday.

== The Independent today ==
The publisher of the Independent is Terrie Baker; Prior to serving as publisher, Baker served as The Independent's general manager for two years. She joined the Independent in 2017 after serving as publisher of the North Platte Telegraph since 2015. The managing editor is Jim Faddis; he had worked for the Independent for 25 years before being promoted from editorial page editor to managing editor in 2007.

Beside the daily newspaper, the Independent publishes a free-circulation weekly titled Trade West, with a circulation of about 20,000, focusing on "rural and agricultural readers".
