= KMAJ =

KMAJ may refer to:

- KMAJ-FM, a radio station (107.7 FM) licensed to Topeka, Kansas, United States
- KMAJ (AM), a radio station (1440 AM) licensed to Carbondale, Kansas
