= KTOP =

KTOP may refer to:

- KTOP (AM), a radio station (1490 AM) licensed to Topeka, Kansas, United States
- KTOP-FM, a radio station (102.9 FM) licensed to St. Mary's, Kansas, United States
