= The Maryville Forum =

Newspaper in Missouri, U.S.

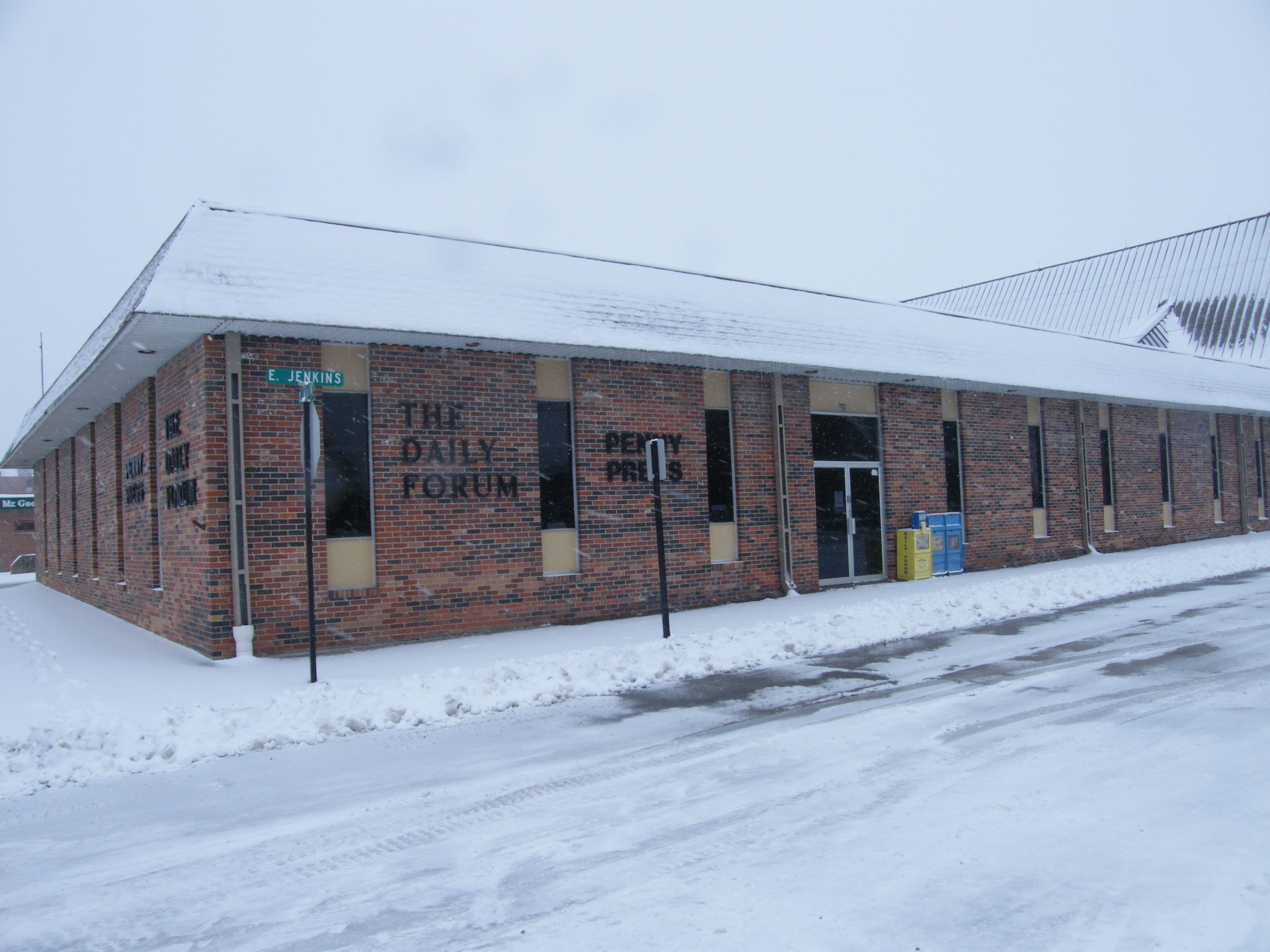
- Forum building at East Jenkins and South Main streets
- Type: Weekly newspaper
- Format: Broadsheet
- Owner(s): Garner Media Holdings, LLC
- Language: English
- Headquarters: 111 East Jenkins Street, Maryville, Missouri, United States
- Website: maryvilleforum.com

The Maryville Forum is a weekly newspaper published Thursdays in Maryville, Missouri, United States. In June 2021, the newspaper was purchased by Ken and Traci Garner via their publishing company Garner Media Holdings, LLC from former owners Phil and Chaundee Cobb of Cobb Publishing. Previously, the newspaper, also formerly known as Maryville Daily Forum, was acquired by its former general manager Phil Cobb via his Cobb Publishing company from GateHouse Media in December 2013.

In addition to Maryville, The Maryville Forum covers Nodaway County, Missouri, and surrounding areas.

== Newspaper merger history ==
The Forum in its current form is the result of a merger of the following papers.

- Nodaway Democrat (established 1869)
- Maryville Republican (established 1869)
- Maryville Tribune (established 1893)
- Nodaway Forum (established 1901)

== History ==
The newspaper traces its roots to the Nodaway Democrat published in 1869 by future Missouri Governor Albert P. Morehouse. Morehouse 1865 published the Maryville Gazette which was just a list of taxes due. In 1869 he launched a more ambitious newspaper.

In the early 1900s William C. Van Cleve, publisher of the Moberly Monitor-Index, merged the Democrat with the Nodaway Forum which had been established on October 24, 1901 by future Congressman Charles J. Colden and the paper was called the Maryville Democrat-Forum.

In 1929 Oscar S. Stauffer bought the paper and changed the name to the Maryville Daily Forum. Marion W. Stauffer (no relation to Oscar) was the paper's publisher from 1929 until 1966. The Forum was one of Stauffer's first acquisitions in the Stauffer Communications empire that would eventually cover 11 states.

In 1986 Stauffer sold the paper to Phillips Media of Berryville, Arkansas.

The paper's other owners have included Morris Communications (which in turn sold it to GateHouse).

Phil Cobb bought the newspaper from Gatehouse in 2013. In 2017 he converted it to a weekly newspaper coming out on Thursdays. Cobb had worked at the Forum for Gatehouse but left 2012 to form a competing newspaper to keep local advertising in the community rather than going to the corporate parent.

In June 2021 Ken and Traci Garner purchased the paper from Cobb keeping it locally owned.

The paper's office from 1941 to 1971 was just off the Nodaway County Square at 414 North Main. In 1971 they moved to a location on South Main. On August 31, 2011, the wall of the original North Main building (which had been taken over by a bar called The Pub) collapsed.

Currently the newspaper office is located at 111 E. Jenkins St. in Maryville, Missouri.

== Movie ==
In 2021 the movie Below the Fold, written and directed by Grant City, Missouri native Clayton Scott told of a fictional account of two Forum reporters investigating a murder in Skidmore, Missouri. The film included filming at the Forum offices.
