= Dolph Simons =

American journalist, publisher, and media executive

Dolph C. Simons Jr.
- Born: March 11, 1930 (age 95)
- Occupation(s): Journalist, publisher, and media executive
- Awards: Kansas Newspaper Hall of Fame (2004); Clyde M. Reed Jr. Master Editor Award (1997)

Dolph C. Simons Jr. (born 1930) is an American journalist, publisher, and media executive. He is best known for his work with the Lawrence Journal-World and the World Company. A respected figure in the Kansas newspaper industry, Simons has received numerous accolades, including induction into the Kansas Newspaper Hall of Fame in 2004 and the Clyde M. Reed Jr. Master Editor Award in 1997.

== Early life and education ==
Dolph C. Simons Jr. was born into a family with a long history in the newspaper business. His grandfather, W.C. Simons, founded the World Company in 1891. His father, Dolph C. Simons Sr., was a prominent newspaperman. He attended Lawrence High School and later graduated with a degree in journalism from the University of Kansas in 1951.

=== Military service ===
During his senior year at the University of Kansas, Simons enlisted in the United States Marine Corps during the Korean War. He played football for the Marine Corps team at Marine Corps Base Quantico for several years. Upon his discharge in 1953, he held the rank of Captain.

== Career ==
After completing his education and military service, Simons worked as a journalist at The Times in London and The Star in Johannesburg, South Africa. He then returned to his family's newspaper business in Lawrence, working in various capacities at the World Company and the Lawrence Journal-World. He eventually became the editor of the Journal-World and, later, its publisher. Under his leadership, the newspaper was firmly committed to community journalism and local news coverage.

In 1979, Allen Neuharth sought distributors for a new daily national newspaper called USA Today. Simons Jr. told Neuharth, "If you want to have a print site in the middle of the U.S., I'd love to have a shot at it". The newspaper page design was done in northern Virginia and sent via satellite at 10:30 PM to Lawrence to be distributed each morning from Des Moines, Iowa to Oklahoma.

Simons Jr. also served in numerous leadership roles within the Kansas newspaper industry. He was a member of the Kansas Press Association's board of directors and was president from 1975 to 1976. Additionally, he was a member of the Inland Press Association and the American Newspaper Publishers Association.

Throughout his career, Simons Jr. received several awards for his contributions to journalism. In 2001, he was honored with the Clyde M. Reed Jr. Master Editor Award, which recognizes outstanding service to the newspaper profession. In 2004, he was inducted into the Kansas Newspaper Hall of Fame, cementing his status as a leading figure in the state's newspaper industry.

== Personal life ==
Dolph C. Simons Jr. is married and has four children.
