= The Holland Sentinel =

Newspaper in Holland, Michigan

- Type: Daily newspaper
- Format: Broadsheet
- Owner: USA Today Co.
- Editor: Cassandra Lybrink
- Founded: July 1, 1896; 130 years ago, as The Holland Daily Sentinel
- Headquarters: 54 West Eighth Street, Holland, Michigan 49423, United States
- Circulation: 4,417 Daily; 6,616 Sunday (as of 2022)
- ISSN: 1050-4044
- Website: hollandsentinel.com

The Holland Sentinel is a newspaper published six days a week in Holland, Michigan, United States, founded in 1896. It is published by USA Today Co.

The newspaper covers most of Ottawa County, including Holland, Beechwood and Zeeland, as well as northern Allegan County, Michigan, including Douglas and Saugatuck.

== History ==
Originally an afternoon paper published six days a week, the Sentinel moved to Saturday mornings and then added a Sunday edition in the late 1980s. In the late 1990s, the paper adopted a morning format for all seven days.

Before adopting the name The Holland Sentinel, it was called The Holland Evening Sentinel (1928–1977), and before that the Holland Daily Sentinel.

The paper was formerly owned by Stauffer Communications, which was acquired by Morris Communications in 1994. Morris sold the paper, along with 13 others, to GateHouse Media in 2007. In 2019, GateHouse announced it was acquiring Gannett to become the country's largest newspaper chain in the United States.

In the mid 1980s, the Sentinel was a satellite publishing site for the Chicago Tribune.

In the early 2000s, printing operations were moved to the Allegan, Michigan, facilities of The Flashes, a weekly advertising only newspaper that Morris Communications had purchased a few years prior. The paper is now published in Detroit.
