= The Oak Ridger =

Newspaper in Oak Ridge, Tennessee

- Type: Daily newspaper
- Owner: USA Today Co.
- Founded: January 20, 1949
- Headquarters: 575 Oak Ridge Turnpike, Suite 100, Oak Ridge, Tennessee 37830, United States
- ISSN: 0890-6009
- Website: oakridger.com

The Oak Ridger is an American daily newspaper published Mondays through Fridays in Oak Ridge, Tennessee. It is owned by USA Today Co. The news editor is Donna Smith.

== History ==
The Oak Ridger was established in 1949 by Alfred and Julia Hill. It published its first edition on January 20 of that year. The first publisher was Don J. McKay. The paper was owned for many years by the Hill family. Dick Smyser was its long-time editor. The Hill family sold the paper to Stauffer Communications in 1987. Stauffer sold it to Morris Communications in 1995. In 2007, Morris sold The Oak Ridger to GateHouse along with 13 other American newspapers.
