= The Morning Sun =

Newspaper in Pittsburg, Kansas

The Morning Sun (Pittsburg, Kansas)
- Type: Daily newspaper
- Owners: Pittsburg Publishing LLC (2021-): Gannett (2019–2021); GateHouse Media (2007–2019); Morris Communications (1994–2007); Stauffer Communications (1927–1994); Moore family (~late 1880s–1927)
- Publisher: Jeffrey M. Peyton (2022- ) Larry Hiatt (2021-2022) James Honeycutt (2016–2021); Steve Boggs (2012); Steve Wade (2002–2012)
- Founded: 1885
- Language: English
- Headquarters: 701 North Locust Street, Pittsburg, Kansas 66762, United States
- Circulation: 2,408
- Website: morningsun.net

The Morning Sun is a newspaper published in Pittsburg, Kansas, United States. Though its history dates to the 1880s, it has been known as the Morning Sun since 1973. It was a seven-day daily paper, but decreased to five print editions a week (Tuesday to Friday, and Sunday) as of April 2017. The paper was purchased by Pittsburg Publishing LLC in September 2021, and is currently published five days a week (Tue-Sat).

== History ==
=== Early history (1880s to 1966) ===
The Morning Sun traces its origin to the Pittsburg Headlight, a weekly which began publication in 1885, under the ownership of brothers Millard Fillmore (M.F.) Sears and W.F. Sears and cousin Harry Sears. M.F. Sears soon became the sole owner and took on Clarence W. (C.W.) Moore as his partner. In 1886, the Headlight bought out the Pittsburg Democrat, which had been published by Thomas P. Montfort. (Montfort had acquired that publication around 1881, when it was called The People's Exponent (founded 1880), and had renamed it.) By 1887, Sears and Moore were publishing the Pittsburg Daily Headlight as a daily paper. After C.W. Moore bought out M.F. Sears' interest, he began publishing with his father, William Moore (d. 1897) as "William Moore and Son" by 1888. Two other sons of William Moore, J.T. and George A., joined by 1896, and eventually succeeded to ownership of the paper.

In 1915, Paul Jones founded the Pittsburg Sun, which was a morning paper. The Moore brothers purchased that paper in 1927, and both the Headlight and Sun were purchased that year by Oscar Stauffer. Stauffer's media holdings developed into Stauffer Communications.

Perhaps the most notable editor of the papers was Frederick W. (F.W.) Brinkeroff (b. Feb. 13, 1885, d. Aug. 13, 1966), who became editor of the Headlight in 1911, and also editor of the Sun in 1927. He served as editor of both papers until his death in August 1966, and was soon after inducted into the Kansas Newspaper Hall of Fame.

=== 1966 Headlight and Sun merger to present ===
In 1966, the afternoon Headlight and morning Sun were merged into the Headlight-Sun. The Morning Sun name was adopted in 1973.

In 1994, Morris Communications announced plans to acquire Stauffer Communications, which by that time was operating 20 daily newspapers (including the Morning Sun) and eight weeklies, in addition to a number of television and radio stations. At the time the circulation was 10,312. In 2007, GateHouse Media acquired the paper from Morris Publishing Group, as part of a larger sale of papers.

As of 2009, the reported circulation of the paper was 9,850. Circulation had declined to just over 4,000 by 2017. In March 2017, the paper announced it was moving from publishing 6-days a week (all days except Monday) to 5-days a week (dropping the Saturday edition).

== See also ==
- List of newspapers in Kansas
