= Hillsdale Daily News =

American daily newspaper

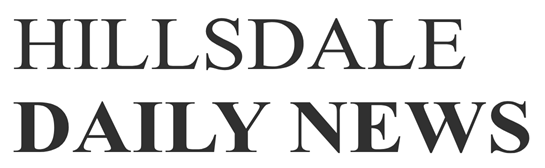

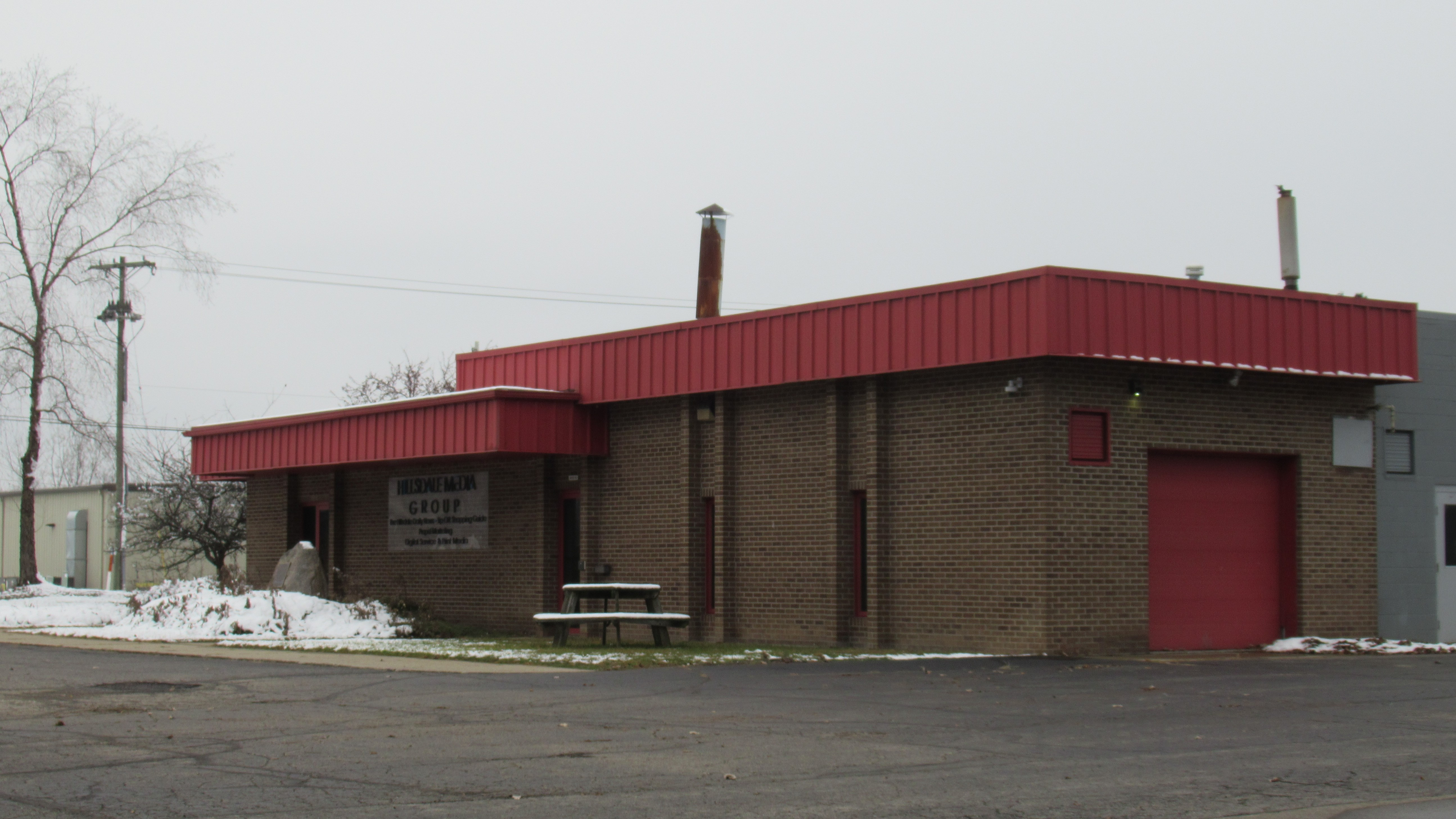
- Hillsdale Daily News office
- Type: Daily newspaper
- Format: Broadsheet
- Owner: USA Today Co.
- Publisher: Orestes Baez
- Editor: Candice Phelps
- Founded: 1846, as Hillsdale Whig Standard
- Headquarters: 263 Industrial Drive, Hillsdale, Michigan 49242, United States
- Circulation: 2,716 (as of 2022)
- OCLC number: 35329761
- Website: hillsdale.net

The Hillsdale Daily News is a daily newspaper published in Hillsdale, Michigan, in the United States. It is owned by USA Today Co.

The Daily News covers Hillsdale County, Michigan, including the city of Hillsdale and the cities and villages of Camden, Jonesville, Litchfield, Pittsford, Reading and North Adams.

== History ==
Founded in the 1846 as the weekly Hillsdale Whig Standard, the newspaper dropped the name "Whig" in 1851 and converted to daily publication as the Hillsdale Daily Standard Herald, after absorbing its local competitor the Herald-Democrat, in 1909. From 1911 to 1915 it was called simply The Hillsdale Daily before adopting its current name.

The paper was formerly owned by Stauffer Communications, which was acquired by Morris Communications in 1994. Morris sold the paper, along with thirteen others, to GateHouse Media in 2007.
