= Baldwin City Signal =

- Type: Weekly newspaper
- Publisher: Dolph Simons, Jr
- Editor: Elvyn Jones
- Headquarters: 703 High Street; Baldwin City, Kansas 66006; USA
- Circulation: 899
- Website: signal.baldwincity.com

The Baldwin City Signal was a local weekly newspaper for Baldwin City, Kansas. The paper was published by The World Company in Lawrence, Kansas. The circulation was reported as 899. The newspaper also maintained an online presence. The World Company closed the Signal on December 31, 2015.
