= WIBW-TV =

Television station in Topeka, Kansas

- Topeka, Kansas; United States
- Channels: Digital: 13 (VHF); Virtual: 13
- Branding: WIBW-TV 13; 13 News; MyTV 13.2/MeTV Topeka

Programming
- Affiliations: 13.1: CBS; 13.2: MyNetworkTV/MeTV; for others, see § Subchannels

Ownership
- Owner: Gray Media; (Gray Television Licensee, LLC)

History
- First air date: November 15, 1953
- Former channel numbers: Analog: 13 (VHF, 1953–2009); Digital: 44 (UHF, 2002–2009)
- Former affiliations: All secondary: DuMont (1953–1955); NBC (1953–1967); ABC (1953–1983)
- Call sign meaning: None (sequentially assigned) (Note: A folk etymology has developed ("What's In a Name? Radio Knows" (AP, Kansas City) by Jim Bagby, Manhattan (Kansas) Mercury, June 27, 1985, p. 7.) that when Arthur Capper bought the station in 1929, he chose the WIBW call letters to match a supposed original owner of "Indiana Broadcast Works". However, WIBW had actually been assigned this call sign, randomly from a sequential list, when it was first licensed 3 1/2 years before Capper purchased it. There is also no evidence that an entity named "Indiana Broadcast Works" ever existed.)

Technical information
- Licensing authority: FCC
- Facility ID: 63160
- ERP: 65.5 kW
- HAAT: 402.8 m (1,322 ft)
- Transmitter coordinates: 39°0′22″N 96°2′58″W
- Translator(s): 33 (UHF) Topeka (city)

Links
- Public license information: Public file; LMS
- Website: www.wibw.com

WIBW-TV (channel 13) is a television station in Topeka, Kansas, United States, affiliated with CBS and MyNetworkTV. Owned by Gray Media, the station maintains studios on Commerce Place (next to the interchange of I-70, I-470, US 40, US 75 and K-4) in west-southwestern Topeka, and its transmitter is located on Windy Hill Road in Maple Hill.

To serve portions of the market that cannot adequately receive the main signal, WIBW-TV operates a digital fill-in translator in Topeka, which broadcasts on channel 33.

== History ==
=== Multi-affiliate ===
The station first signed on the air on November 15, 1953. WIBW-TV was the first television station to sign on in the Topeka market, and the third to sign on in the state of Kansas (after KCTY in Kansas City, which operated a transmitter in Overland Park, which signed on in June 1953. Channel 13 signed on the same day as KTVH (now sister station KWCH-DT) in Wichita; it is the second-oldest surviving television station in Kansas (behind KWCH, as KCTY ceased operations in February 1954). The television station originally operated from studio facilities located on 6th Street and Wanamaker Road in west Topeka, near the Menninger Clinic, where it shared the facility with co-owned WIBW radio (AM 580). The facility, which was later abandoned, was severely damaged by fire on January 5, 2012.

Channel 13 was originally owned by the family of the late Kansas Senator Arthur Capper, and was co-owned with the Topeka Daily Capital and WIBW radio. The station originally also carried programming from all four other major networks of the time (CBS, NBC, ABC and the DuMont Television Network), but has always been a primary CBS affiliate. On the day of its sign-on, following an introductory program presented by the station's staff, WIBW-TV aired its first program, a DuMont network broadcast of an NFL game between the San Francisco 49ers and the Cleveland Browns.

WIBW-TV was the only commercial television station in the Topeka market for fifteen years. This was largely because the only other VHF frequency in the Topeka area, channel 11, had been designated for non-commercial broadcasting use; that allocation eventually was occupied by KTWU, which signed on the air in October 1965. However, area residents did not have to worry about missing their favorite network programs since the Kansas City stations all provided decent signal coverage within Topeka; they have been available on the area's local cable providers since the 1960s. Although Topeka was originally part of the Kansas City market, the Federal Communications Commission (FCC) made Topeka a separate market in 1963. While the city itself and its close-in suburbs receive strong signals from the Kansas City stations, some parts of northeastern Kansas to the west of the city only get a marginal signal at best.

In September 1954, the station relocated its transmitter facilities to a 950-foot (290 m) broadcast tower located 500 yards (457 m) west of the original tower (the tower was later leased to Washburn University when KTWU signed on). In 1961, WIBW-AM-TV were joined by a second radio sister, WIBW-FM (94.5 FM). The station lost the DuMont affiliation when that network ceased operations in August 1956.

WIBW-TV is one of the few television stations located west of the Mississippi River that utilizes a call sign that begins with the letter "W". WIBW radio began in Logansport, Indiana, in 1925 and was briefly a portable station for much of 1926 before moving to Topeka in 1927 under Capper's sponsorship. Capper bought the station later in 1927. However, Kansas was located on the eastern side of the original call divide, so it would have been acceptable to have a "W" in Kansas in any event.

In 1957, Capper Publications merged with Stauffer Publications, owner of Topeka's other newspaper, the Topeka State Journal. In 1966, WIBW-TV became the first television station in Topeka to broadcast in color. The station lost its NBC affiliation when KTSB (channel 27, now KSNT) signed on in December 1967.

=== CBS-only affiliate ===
WIBW-TV and KSNT continued to split the local rights to ABC programming for 16 years, until KLDH (channel 49, now KTKA) signed on the air as the market's third television outlet in June 1983.

The Daily Capital and State Journal, which later merged as the Topeka Capital-Journal in 1981, and WIBW-AM-FM-TV remained the flagships of Stauffer Publications (later renamed Stauffer Communications) until 1995, when Stauffer merged with Augusta, Georgia-based Morris Communications. Because the FCC's "one to a market" rule barred companies from owning newspapers and broadcast outlets in the same market, as a condition of the sale, Morris had to sell Stauffer's television holdings, including channel 13. However, Morris would have likely had to sell off channel 13 in any event. When the "one to a market" rule went into effect in 1968, the combination of the Daily Capital, State Journal, and WIBW-AM-FM-TV were protected by a grandfather clause that allowed existing newspaper and broadcasting combinations. This protection was ended when Stauffer merged with Morris. Most of Stauffer's television stations, including WIBW-TV, were sold to Benedek Broadcasting in 1996. Morris retained the Capital Journal and the WIBW radio stations, though it has since sold the WIBW radio stations to Alpha Media.

In 2001, WIBW-TV relocated from its original studios on Southwest 6th Avenue into a new state-of-the-art facility on Commerce Place in southwest Topeka (WIBW radio subsequently relocated to studio facilities located on Executive Drive in southwest Topeka's Huntoon Hill neighborhood).

==== Gray Television ownership ====
Benedek—which was already financially challenged—filed a Chapter 7 bankruptcy declaration in 2002, due to debt incurred by the company's all-cash purchases of ABC affiliate KAKE in Wichita and NBC affiliate WOWT-TV in Omaha, Nebraska, in exchange for NBC affiliate WWLP in Springfield, Massachusetts, the previous year; the company then sold most of its stations, including WIBW-TV, to Atlanta-based Gray Television.

After KSQA signed on in September 2011, WIBW-TV began experiencing signal issues on Cox Communications channel 12, due to the over-the-air signal of KSQA (which broadcasts on channel 12 over-the-air) causing electromagnetic interference with the analog frequency on WIBW's cable slot. On June 13, 2012, KSQA, LLC filed a complaint with the FCC to invoke a must-carry request for Cox to carry it on channel 12, which would have displaced WIBW to a newly assigned channel slot. Although KSQA, LLC had its request denied by the FCC on the basis its cable placement should be determined by its virtual channel (KSQA was mapped as virtual channel 22) and Cox previously informed that it preferred not to move WIBW-TV off its existing channel slot to replace it with KSQA, Cox eventually moved WIBW-TV to channel 13 on March 14, 2013, after the FCC granted a waiver by KSQA to move its virtual channel to 12, with that station being placed on WIBW's former cable slot on channel 12.

On May 23, 2012, a man broke into the WIBW studio lobby, stabbed two station employees and bit another employee. The station's sales manager Roger Brokke and sales associate Greg Palmer received non-life-threatening leg injuries in the attack. The attacker, identified as 48-year-old Ray Miles, was upset because WIBW news director Jon Janes was unable to help him with a problem involving the Department of Veterans Affairs. Miles was arrested on suspicion of six counts, including aggravated battery and burglary.

== WIBW-DT2 ==
WIBW-DT2 is the primary MeTV and secondary MyNetworkTV-affiliated second digital subchannel of WIBW-TV, broadcasting in standard definition on channel 13.2. The subchannel is officially branded as "My Topeka TV" (formerly My Network Topeka) for general purposes (both during time periods occupied by MyNetworkTV programming as well as for promotions for the programming service), and alternately branded as "MeTV Topeka" during MeTV programming hours.

=== History ===
On February 22, 2006, News Corporation (which would later spin off its American television properties into 21st Century Fox in July 2013) announced the launch of MyNetworkTV, a new network that would be operated by two of its divisions, Fox Television Stations and 20th Television. MyNetworkTV was created to compete against another upstart network that would launch at the same time that September, The CW—a network created through a partnership between CBS Corporation and Time Warner, which had announced one month earlier on January 24 that the two companies would respectively shut down UPN and The WB, which originally consisted primarily of the higher-rated programs from its two predecessors; MyNetworkTV was also formed to give UPN- and WB-affiliated stations that were not named as The CW's charter affiliates another option besides converting into independent stations. Prior to the CW announcement, WIBW station management had considered launching a digital subchannel affiliated with UPN (which had previously been affiliated with Fox affiliate KTMJ-CA (channel 43) from the network's launch in 1995 until 2003, with its programming airing in late-evening timeslots).

On March 13, 2006, WIBW was named as MyNetworkTV's Topeka affiliate through a 13-station affiliation agreement with owner Gray Television. One month later on April 10, 2006, Montecito Broadcast Group announced that NBC affiliate KSNT (channel 27) would serve as The CW's Topeka affiliate (through its national feed for smaller markets, The CW Plus), carrying the network on its second digital subchannel.

WIBW-TV first signed its second digital subchannel on the air on September 5, 2006, as a primary affiliate of MyNetworkTV and a secondary affiliate of the multicultural television network Colours TV. In September 2009, WIBW-DT2 became a secondary affiliate of This TV, carrying a mix of syndicated programming to fill select evening time periods otherwise occupied by feature film content from the network.

The subchannel disaffiliated from This TV on September 10, 2012, and switched its secondary affiliation to MeTV (both networks were owned at the time by Weigel Broadcasting). MeTV programming airs on WIBW-DT2 during the late morning, afternoon and overnight hours as well as much of the weekend schedule outside of late afternoon and evening timeslots. In a September 5 interview with The Topeka Capital-Journal, then-WIBW-TV general manager Jim Ogle cited that the station chose to switch 13.2's secondary affiliation to allow leverage in scheduling local newscasts and sports programs onto the subchannel, as the vast majority of MeTV programs run either 30 minutes or an hour in length, in comparison to the feature-length movies aired by This TV. Most of the syndicated programming aired on the subchannel was dropped by September 2014, when WIBW-DT2 began clearing most of the MeTV schedule outside of the first two hours of prime time on weeknights that are occupied by MyNetworkTV content. As of 2021, MyNetworkTV programming now airs in an overnight slot from 1 to 3 a.m. CT.

== News operation ==
WIBW-TV presently broadcasts 28 1/2 hours of locally produced newscasts each week. The station's Sunday 5 p.m. newscast is subject to preemption due to network sports coverage; as such, the station broadcasts live half-hour editions of that newscast on WIBW-DT2 on certain weeks in which a CBS Sports telecast (usually golf tournaments sanctioned by the PGA Tour and National Football League games with kickoff times of 3:05 p.m. or 3:25 p.m.) is scheduled to air past their scheduled end-time on the station's main channel.

WIBW-TV has been the far-and-away market leader in Topeka for as long as viewership records have been kept. This was mainly due to being the only station in town for 14 years. It has maintained a solid ratings lead even after gaining competitors in KSNT when that station signed on as KTSB in 1967, and KTKA-TV (the perennial third-place finisher among the market's newscasts for most of its history, except during its four-year tenure without a news department from 2002 to 2006) after that station signed on in 1983 as KLDH. In 1972, WIBW-TV acquired the first live weather radar in the Topeka market for broadcasting use. The station was also the first to bring several news-gathering and technical innovations in the market: it was the first television station to use microwave LNC live trucks (in 1982), and is the only Topeka station with a live truck for electronic news-gathering (having acquired such a vehicle in 1989).

The station is noted for its coverage of a destructive F5 tornado that killed 16 people and injured 450 others as it tracked northeast across Topeka on the early evening of June 8, 1966. A then-unknown Bill Kurtis – at the time, a 26-year-old balancing duties as a reporter for WIBW-TV while also a law student at Washburn University – wanted to get a message across to viewers watching the station's storm coverage to take shelter from the impending twister before it struck their particular area; ultimately, he advised viewers to get to safety by urging in a calm but stern manner, "for God's sake, take cover!" Channel 13 provided 24 consecutive hours of coverage beginning when the tornado struck Topeka, later transitioning to coverage of the storm's aftermath. In the days after the tornado hit the city, the station was flooded with viewer letters thanking Kurtis and channel 13 for the urgent warning.

On November 11, 1998, WIBW announced that it would cancel its noon newscast (known for most of its history as Midday in Kansas) due to unspecified economic conditions, replacing the program with Martha Stewart Living; the move to cancel the program (at the time and presently, the only midday newscast among the Topeka market's television stations) after the November 25 broadcast, which would have resulted in the layoffs of 12 staffers, resulted in viewer letters protesting the move to convince then-WIBW vice president/general manager Gary Sotir "get creative" to save the highly rated program, which received its highest viewership among farmers and senior citizens, leading the station to reverse course on the decision.

WIBW (along with former ABC-affiliated sister station KAKE-TV in Wichita) was one of two partners in Kansas Now 22, a cable channel available on fellow partner Cox Communications' systems throughout Kansas. WIBW and KAKE each produced five-minute pre-recorded news segments that ran on the channel in 15-minute intervals as well as an additional three-minute weather segment that was also taped. The two stations alternated time slots for both news and weather segments. Live news or weather bulletins from KAKE in Wichita would interrupt the channel's regular taped programming schedule. Kansas Now 22 ceased operations on January 2, 2009, before relaunching four weeks later on January 28 as Kansas 22, with content originating from the respective NBC affiliates in Wichita and Topeka, KSNW and KSNT (then both owned by LIN Media).

In September 2007, WIBW began producing local newscasts for its second digital subchannel, in the form of a one-hour extension of its weekday morning newscast 13 News This Morning (initially running from 7 to 8 a.m., with a rebroadcast immediately afterward; before expanding to a full two-hour broadcast in September 2009) and a half-hour prime time newscast at 9 p.m. each weeknight, in addition to simulcasts of the 5 to 7 a.m. block of the weekday morning newscast seen on WIBW's main channel; these newscasts preempted classic television series and children's programming broadcast by WIBW-DT2's secondary This TV, and later MeTV affiliations, during those time periods. The morning and prime time newscasts on WIBW-DT2 competed with those produced by NBC affiliate KSNT seen on that station's Fox-affiliated sister KTMJ-CD (channel 43).

The subchannel also began airing simulcasts of the Saturday evening 6 p.m., Sunday evening 5:30 p.m. and weekend 10 p.m. newscasts (mainly due to preemptions incurred by CBS Sports broadcasts that run into those programs' timeslots on the station's main channel). The morning and 9 p.m. newscasts were cancelled in September 2014, with their former time periods replaced by classic television series provided by the subchannel's secondary MeTV affiliation; as such, WIBW-DT2 airs very little programming other than that provided by MeTV and MyNetworkTV or through sports syndication services.

On February 23, 2012, beginning with its 6 p.m. newscast, WIBW-TV became the first television station in the Topeka market to being broadcasting its local newscasts in high definition.

=== Notable former on-air staff ===
- Gary Bender
- Kevin Harlan – summer sports intern (1979)
- Mike Jerrick – anchor/reporter
- Gordon Jump – later actor, known for his role in WKRP in Cincinnati
- Bill Kurtis – reported on 1966 Topeka tornado, more well-known as journalist and news personality later
- Steve Physioc – sports anchor
- Russ Ptacek – morning anchor/reporter (1988–1993)
- Devin Scillian – anchor/reporter
- Fred White – sports anchor

=== Awards ===
WIBW-TV has won numerous awards for numerous newscasts and reporting throughout its history:

WIBW-TV awards

Year	Award	Result	Category	Title	Recipient
2010	2010–2011 KAB Awards	Won	Station of the Year		
2010	KAB Awards (1st Place Awards)	Won	Prime Newscast	13 News	
2010	KAB Awards (1st Place Awards)	Won	AM/Noon Newscast	13 News This Morning	
2010	KAB Awards (1st Place Awards)	Won	Single Topic Event News Coverage	Reading Tornado	13 News Team
2010	KAB Awards (1st Place Awards)	Won	In-Depth News Reporting	Deadly Game: Kids & Concussions	Melissa Brunner & Doug Brown
2010	KAB Awards (1st Place Awards)	Won	Special Program	Children of Hope	Melissa Brunner & Doug Brown
2010	KAB Awards (1st Place Awards)	Won	Commercial, Any Length	Topeka Civic Theatre & Academy "75th Anniversary"	Pablo Martinez II
2010	KAB Awards (1st Place Awards)	Won	Commercial Series	CJ Online Spots	Dylan Schoonover
2010	KAB Awards (1st Place Awards)	Won	Station Promotion Announcement	WIBW Topeka Newsletter: "Myth"	Pablo Martinez II
2010	KAB Awards (1st Place Awards)	Won	Station Promotion Campaign	Like Us on Facebook	Pablo Martinez II
2010	KAB Awards (Honorable Mentions)	Won	News Feature, Enterprise Story	No Bad Breaks	Matt Blanchette
2010	KAB Awards (Honorable Mentions)	Won	In-Depth News Reporting	The Truancy Cops	Melissa Brunner & Doug Brown
2010	KAB Awards (Honorable Mentions)	Won	Station Web Site	WIBW.com	Josh Mabry & 13 News Team
2010	KAB Awards (Honorable Mentions)	Won	Commercial, Any Length	Payless Furniture	Dylan Schoonover
2010	KAB Awards (Honorable Mentions)	Won	Commercial Series	Jones Advisory Group	Dylan Schoonover
2010	KAB Awards (Honorable Mentions)	Won	Station Promotion Announcement	We're #1	Emio Tomeoni
2010	KAB Awards (Honorable Mentions)	Won	Station Promotion Campaign	The Artist Spotlight	Dylan Schoonover
2011	2011–2012 KAB Awards (1st Place Awards)	Won	Prime Newscast	13 News	
2011	2011–2012 KAB Awards (1st Place Awards)	Won	AM/Noon Newscast	Midday in Kansas	
2011	2011–2012 KAB Awards (1st Place Awards)	Won	Weathercast		Jeremy Goodwin (chief meteorologist)
2011	2011–2012 KAB Awards (1st Place Awards)	Won	Station Website		Josh Mabry & 13 News Team
2011	2011–2012 KAB Awards (1st Place Awards)	Won	Commercial Series	Simply Amish	Craig Fisher
2013	2013 Heartland Chapter Emmy Awards	Won	Evening Newscast	13 News at 6 (December 17, 2012)	Jon Janes (news director)
2013	2013 Heart of America, Society of Professional; Journalists (Gold Awards)	Won	Deadline Reporting/Breaking News/Spot News	Fallen Officers	13 News Team
2013	2013 Heart of America, Society of Professional; Journalists (Gold Awards)	Won	Regular Franchise Feature	To Your Health	Melissa Brunner & Doug Brown
2013	2013 Heart of America, Society of Professional; Journalists (Gold Awards)	Won	Beat Reporting	To Your Health	Melissa Brunner & Doug Brown
2013	2013 Heart of America, Society of Professional; Journalists (Gold Awards)	Won	News Column or Blog		Melissa Brunner
2013	2013 Heart of America, Society of Professional; Journalists (Silver Awards)	Won	Feature	Long-Lost Love	Melissa Brunner & Doug Brown
2013	2013 Heart of America, Society of Professional; Journalists (Silver Awards)	Won	News Program	13 News at 6	13 News Team

== Technical information ==
=== Subchannels ===
The station's signal is multiplexed:

Subchannels of WIBW-TV
Channel	Res.	Short name	Programming
13.1	1080i	WIBW-HD	CBS
13.2	480i	WIBW-DT	MyNetworkTV & MeTV
13.3	480i	WIBW-HI	Heroes & Icons
13.4	480i	WIBW-ST	Start TV
13.5	480i	WIBW365	365BLK
13.6	480i	WIBWOUT	Outlaw
13.7	480i	WIBW-OX	Oxygen

=== Analog-to-digital conversion ===
WIBW-TV signed on its digital signal on UHF channel 44 in 2002. The station shut down its analog signal, over VHF channel 13, on February 16, 2009, the day prior to the original date on which full-power television stations in the United States were set to transition from analog to digital broadcasts under federal mandate (which was later rescheduled for June 12, 2009). The station's digital signal relocated from its pre-transition UHF channel 44 to VHF channel 13. However, since the transition, some viewers in urban areas of the Topeka market have experienced difficulty receiving the station's channel 13 signal over-the-air. On December 7, 2009, the FCC granted WIBW a construction permit to build transmitter facilities for a fill-in digital translator on the station's pre-transition UHF digital channel 44.
