= WIBW (AM) =

Radio station in Topeka, Kansas

- Topeka, Kansas; United States
- Broadcast area: Topeka metropolitan area
- Frequency: 580 kHz
- Branding: 580 WIBW

Programming
- Format: Talk and sports
- Network: NBC News Radio
- Affiliations: Fox News Radio; Compass Media Networks; Premiere Networks; Radio America; Kansas City Royals; Kansas State Wildcats; Kansas City Chiefs

Ownership
- Owner: Connoisseur Media; (Alpha Media Licensee LLC)
- Sister stations: KSAJ; KTPK; WIBW-FM

History
- First air date: 1925
- Call sign meaning: None (sequentially assigned) (Note: A folk etymology has developed ("What's In a Name? Radio Knows" (AP, Kansas City) by Jim Bagby, Manhattan (Kansas) Mercury, June 27, 1985, p. 7.) that when Arthur Capper bought the station in 1929, he chose the WIBW call letters to match a supposed original owner of "Indiana Broadcast Works". However, WIBW had actually been assigned this call sign, randomly from a sequential list, when it was first licensed three years and a half years before Capper purchased it. There is also no evidence that an entity named "Indiana Broadcast Works" ever existed.)

Technical information
- Licensing authority: FCC
- Facility ID: 63169
- Class: B
- Power: 5,000 watts
- Transmitter coordinates: 39°5′5″N 95°46′58.9″W
- Translator: 104.9 K285GL (Topeka)

Links
- Public license information: Public file; LMS
- Webcast: Listen live
- Website: 580wibw.com

WIBW (580 AM) is a commercial radio station licensed to Topeka, Kansas, United States. It is owned by Connoisseur Media and airs a talk and sports format. The studios and offices are on SW Executive Drive in Topeka. The transmitter is off NW Landon Road in Silver Lake.

WIBW is simulcast on 250 watt FM translator station K285GL at 104.9 MHz.

== Signal ==
WIBW transmits at 5,000 watts around the clock. A single non-directional tower is used during the day. Due to WIBW's low transmitting frequency, plus Kansas's flat terrain and excellent ground conductivity, the station has an unusually large daytime coverage area, equivalent to that of a full-power FM station. It offers at least grade B coverage of a majority of Kansas, as well as large portions of Nebraska, Missouri, Oklahoma and Iowa. Besides its home market of Topeka, it can be heard at city-grade strength in Emporia, lower southeastern Nebraska, and most of the Kansas City metropolitan area. Grade B coverage includes most of southern and central Kansas, including Hays, Great Bend, Wichita, and Pittsburg, as well as Omaha and Lincoln, Nebraska, most of southwest Missouri, southwestern portions of Iowa, and northeastern Oklahoma as far as Tulsa. Under the right conditions, it can be heard in much of Iowa, as well as slivers of South Dakota and Arkansas.

At night a two-tower array directional antenna is used, which sends a majority of the signal westward to protect adjacent clear-channel stations, but still delivering a secondary signal to the Kansas City area. At night the station's signal can be heard in Kansas, Nebraska, Missouri, and parts of Oklahoma.

== History ==
=== Early years ===
On July 24, 1925, WIBW first signed on the air. It was owned by Dr. Lawrence L. Dill of Logansport, Indiana. Dill operated the station along with his business partner, Donald Harrell. Because it began in Indiana, a state where "W" call signs are standard, it has kept its WIBW call letters, even after its move to Missouri and then Kansas, states that mostly have call signs beginning with "K".

In late 1926, the station was acquired by C. L. Carrell of Chicago, who converted it into a portable broadcasting station. It joined a roster of seven stations controlled by Carrell. Portable stations could be transported from place-to-place on movable platforms such as trucks. These were generally hired out for a few weeks at a time to theaters, mostly located in small midwestern towns that didn't have their own radio stations, to be used for special programs broadcast to the local community. (Regulating "moving targets" proved difficult, so in May 1928 the Federal Radio Commission announced it was ending the licensing of portable facilities.)

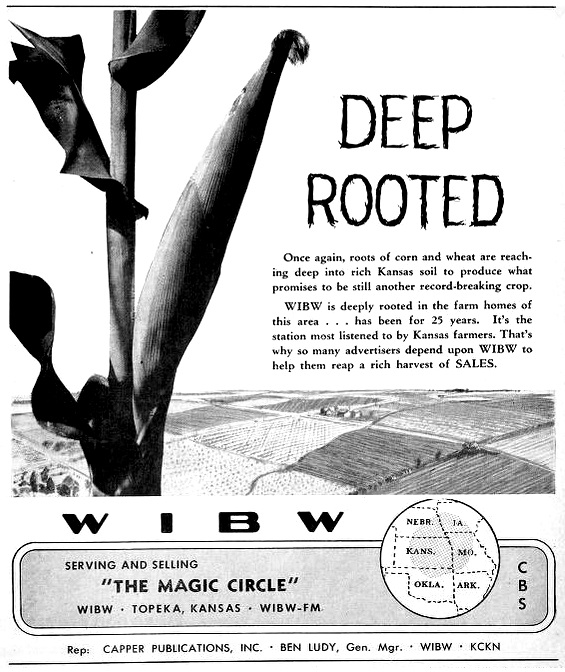
Station advertisement (1949)

WIBW's time as a portable station was brief. In early February 1927 it began broadcasting from the Connor Hotel in Joplin, Missouri. It was still under the management of Donald Harrell. However, on Mother's Day, May 8, it began transmitting under the sponsorship of the Topeka Daily Capital from the Jayhawk Theatre. The studios were located at Tenth and Kansas streets. The debut program, organized by Y.M.C.A. secretary Lyle O. Armel, was described as a benefit for "Flood Sufferers Through Red Cross".

On January 31, 1929, ownership was transferred from C. L. Carrell to the Topeka Broadcasting Association, Inc. It was organized by United States Senator Arthur Capper, who also owned the Capital. Capper died in 1951. In 1957, his family sold the Daily Capital and WIBW AM-TV to Stauffer Publications, owner of Topeka's other newspaper, the Topeka State Journal. WIBW's main studios for decades were located on Wanamaker Road in west Topeka, near the Menninger Clinic. The programming there included live country music at 6:00 a.m. as late as the 1970s. The building housing those studios was severely damaged by fire January 5, 2012.

=== TV and FM stations ===
Stauffer Publications added a television station in 1953, WIBW-TV. It was one of the earliest TV stations to go on the air in Kansas. Because WIBW Radio was a CBS affiliate, WIBW-TV primarily became a CBS television network affiliate as well, although in its early days, it also carried programs from NBC, ABC and the DuMont Television Network.

In 1961, WIBW-FM signed on the air at 97.3 MHz. In its early days, it would mostly simulcast WIBW (AM). By the 1970s, it switched to album rock and later Top 40 hits, before going to country music in 1990. It moved to 94.5 MHz in 2002, to allow a new FM station to go on the air in the Kansas City radio market. In 1997, WIBW-AM-FM were acquired by Morris Communications, while WIBW-TV was bought by Gray Communications. WIBW-AM-FM were acquired by Alpha Media in the 2010s.

In May 2025, Connoisseur Media announced its intent to acquire Alpha Media. The FCC approved the sale on August 13, 2025, and the sale was consummated on September 4.

=== Sharing time ===
Beginning in 1929, WIBW was required to share time on 580 kHz with Kansas State University's radio station KSAC (later KKSU), broadcasting in Manhattan, Kansas. Under the terms of the shared time agreement, the university station was on the air during afternoons, with WIBW broadcasting the other times of the day. While it was common for stations to share frequencies in the early days of radio, what was unusual was that this arrangement lasted for over seventy years. WIBW made several attempts to acquire full time operation on the frequency, especially after 1957, when Oscar Stauffer bought the Daily Capital. Despite political pressure, KSAC/KKSU stayed on the air.

In December 2001, Kansas State decided to move its sports broadcasts to the Mid-America Ag Network (MAAN), after airing them on WIBW continuously since 1969 and off-and-on since the 1950s. WIBW countered that a 1969 amendment to the timeshare agreement had granted WIBW the right to broadcast Wildcat football in exchange for allowing KKSU (then still KSAC) to extend its operating hours by 15 minutes each weekday. After long negotiations, WIBW's parent company Morris Communications agreed to update the arrangement in exchange for full use of the broadcasting hours. This resulted in WIBW buying KKSU's timeslot for $1.5 million, in addition to transferring exclusive rights to all Wildcat sporting events to MAAN. KKSU's final day of broadcasting was November 27, 2002.

=== Royals and Jayhawks ===
In 1969, the Kansas City Royals of Major League Baseball's American League began play, with WIBW carrying the games. In the Royals' early years, WIBW was considered the flagship station for the team's radio network. WIBW is one of the few stations which has broadcast Royals games continuously since the franchise's first season.

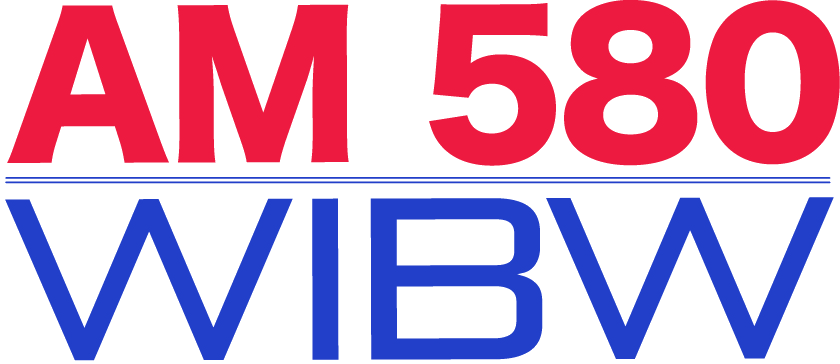
Former logo

In 2006, WIBW became the Topeka outlet for Kansas Jayhawks football and men's basketball games. On June 14, 2014, the Capital-Journal reported that WIBW would end its pact with the University of Kansas. The station renewed its University of Kansas affiliation in 2016, although the Jayhawks broadcasts subsequently moved to KMAJ and KWIC-FM.

== Programming ==
WIBW features both local and nationally syndicated talk shows. Weekdays begin with AG Issues, a morning agricultural and news show with Greg Akagi. Middays feature national shows from Brian Kilmeade and The Clay Travis and Buck Sexton Show. In afternoons, 580 SportsTalk, with Brendan Dzwierzynski, Dan Lucero, and Spencer Dupuis, is heard. Nights include Dave Ramsey along with Chad Benson. Coast to Coast AM with George Noory is heard overnight, with This Morning, America's First News with Gordon Deal airing before dawn.

The station features coverage of local high school sports, as well as Kansas State University Wildcats athletics. WIBW has been an affiliate of the Kansas City Royals Radio Network since the franchise began play in 1969 and has been on the Kansas City Chiefs Radio Network since the 2020 season.

== Former hosts ==
- Mitch Holthus, radio announcer for the Kansas City Chiefs
- Bill Curtis, former CBS TV (national) reporter/anchor (Warned Topekans of the deadly June 6, 1966 tornado.)
- Fred White, (deceased) former 25-year play-by-play broadcaster for the MLB Kansas City Royals

== See also ==
- WIBW-TV
- WIBW-FM
