= KTPK =

Radio station in Topeka, Kansas

- Topeka, Kansas; United States
- Broadcast area: Topeka, Kansas metropolitan area
- Frequency: 106.9 MHz
- Branding: Country 106.9

Programming
- Format: Classic country

Ownership
- Owner: Connoisseur Media; (Alpha Media Licensee LLC)
- Sister stations: KSAJ; WIBW (AM); WIBW-FM

History
- First air date: 1974
- Call sign meaning: "Topeka"

Technical information
- Licensing authority: FCC
- Facility ID: 67334
- Class: C
- ERP: 100,000 watts
- HAAT: 369 meters (1,211 ft)
- Transmitter coordinates: 39°1′34″N 95°55′2″W

Links
- Public license information: Public file; LMS
- Webcast: Listen live
- Website: www.mycountry1069.com

KTPK (106.9 FM) is a radio station broadcasting a classic country format and is branded as "Country 106.9". The station is located in Topeka, Kansas, where it is licensed. The station is owned by Connoisseur Media.

== History ==
Logo as "Country Legends 106.9"

KTPK signed on its country format in 1974. In 1997, Kansas Capital Broadcasting, which also owned KTKA-TV, bought the station. They made several changes like broadcasting Kansas State University football and basketball games until 2005, adopted the name "Twister 106.9" in 1998, and then "K-Country" in 2002. In 2005, KTPK was sold to JMJ Broadcasting Company, Inc for $5.7 million. When JMJ Broadcasting Company, Inc. took over, they no longer wanted sports, so they dropped the KSU football games, and changed the station's name to "Country Legends 106.9", as the format shifted from contemporary country music to classic country. In mid-2006, KTPK soared in the ratings, and as of the latest ratings available (Spring 2012 and again in the Spring of 2013) they were rated #1 in the Topeka market for total listeners aged 12 and up. On September 1, 2015, Alpha Media took ownership of KTPK.

On the morning of November 21, 2018, KTPK dropped its classic country format and began stunting with Christmas music as "Christmas 106.9". On December 26, 2018, KTPK returned to its "Country 106.9" classic country format.

In May 2025, Connoisseur Media announced its intent to acquire Alpha Media. The FCC approved the sale on August 13, 2025, and the sale was consummated on September 4.

== Country Legends 106.9 Miracle Marathon for Kids Radiothon (2006–2015) ==
From 2006 until 2015, KTPK broadcast an annual radiothon for the Children's Miracle Network Hospitals (CMN) at St. Francis Health Center in Topeka, Kansas. The radiothon took place each year during a week in August, from 6AM to 6PM. While on air, they not only raised money for the sick and injured children, but tell stories, as well. 2009 was a record-breaking year for the fundraiser, as they raised a record breaker $105,205.59, up from 2008, where they raised just over $102,000. Subsequently, they raised amounts between $90,000 and $102,000. Following the 2015 CMN radiothon, officials from Children's Miracle Network informed the station it would be moving its local radiothon to the Cumulus Media stations in Topeka. After being purchased by Alpha Media, KTPK became a sister station to WIBW and WIBW-FM. WIBW-FM had been doing their own annual radiothons for St. Jude Children's Research Hospital, and in March 2016, KTPK teamed up with them for the event.
