= KDVV =

- Topeka, Kansas; United States
- Broadcast area: Topeka metropolitan area
- Frequency: 100.3 MHz
- Branding: V100

Programming
- Format: Classic rock
- Affiliations: United Stations Radio Networks; Westwood One

Ownership
- Owner: Cumulus Media; (Cumulus Licensing LLC)
- Sister stations: KMAJ; KMAJ-FM; KTOP; KTOP-FM; KWIC

History
- First air date: May 29, 1960
- Former call signs: KTOP-FM (1960–1976)

Technical information
- Licensing authority: FCC
- Facility ID: 62237
- Class: C
- ERP: 100,000 watts
- HAAT: 300 meters (980 ft)
- Transmitter coordinates: 38°57′15″N 95°54′43″W

Links
- Public license information: Public file; LMS
- Webcast: Listen live
- Website: v100rocks.com

KDVV (100.3 FM) is a commercial radio station licensed to Topeka, Kansas, United States. Owned by Cumulus Media, the station airs a classic rock format branded as "V100" that leans toward harder-edged songs from the 1960s, 1970s and 1980s. The studios are located within Cumulus’ Kansas City cluster in Overland Park (alongside its sister Topeka stations).

KDVV's transmitter is sited on SW Davis Road in Dover.

== History ==
The station signed on the air on May 29, 1960, as KTOP-FM, and was the sister station to KTOP (1490 AM). At first, KTOP-AM-FM simulcast and were network affiliates of the Mutual Broadcasting System. In 1964, KTOP-AM-FM were acquired by Harris Enterprises.

By the 1970s, KTOP-FM had a separate format from 1490 AM. While KTOP (AM) was a Top 40 station in the 1960s and 1970s, KTOP-FM aired an automated country music format. In 1976, the two stations flipped, with KTOP-FM becoming the Top 40 station, playing contemporary hits in FM stereo. During this time, KTOP-FM switched its call letters to KDVV. The Top 40 format continued throughout the 1980s and into the early 1990s.

The station has aired various forms of album rock music since the 1990s, at times leaning heavily on classic rock and at other times playing more new music. In 2014, KDVV became the Topeka affiliate of the Bob & Tom Show. KDVV serves now as the de facto active rock station for Topeka, Junction City, and Manhattan since the nearest active rock station provides only rimshot coverage.
