= Inland Press Association =

American nonprofit organization

The Inland Press Association is a not-for-profit organization based in Des Plaines, Illinois with more than 1,000 daily and weekly newspaper members in all 50 U.S. states as well as Canada and Bermuda. Inland is owned by its member newspapers and operated by a volunteer board with a small professional staff in Des Plaines. Inland describes its principal mission as providing services to the performance of its member newspapers and to promote the newspaper industry at large.

== Products ==
Inland offers the only newspaper industry conferences designed specifically for family owners, for group executives, and for human resources professionals. Among Inland's live events is an annual New Business Development Conference centered on the theme of developing new newspaper revenue streams.

Inland also provides industry research that newspapers use to compare their performances to peers, to identify business opportunities, to monitor employee morale and efficiency and track cost and revenue trends across time.

In partnership with the consultancy Mather Economics LLC, Inland in 2014 launched Publisher Benchmarks, a newspaper performance benchmarking tool that builds upon its previous National Cost & Revenue Study. Publisher Benchmarks employs a Web-based dashboard providing customizable metrics and comparisons in newspaper-specific areas of operations.

Inland's researchers produce benchmarking studies for other newspaper uses. The confidential Newspaper Industry Compensation Survey benchmarks of pay and benefits across newspaper-specific employment categories. The Employee Engagement Study monitors workplace morale, with the intention of identifying possible festering issues beyond the obvious ones such as wages and benefits. The monthly Ad Revenue Opportunity Report provides benchmarks of ROP (run-of-the-paper), classified and preprint advertising linage.

Many of Inland's training and continuing industry education programs are operated through the affiliated Inland Press Foundation, a not-for-profit organization with a separate volunteer board of directors.

The daily and weekly newspapers in the association reach nearly 20 million U.S. homes. While member newspapers include large metro dailies such as Omaha World-Herald, Seattle Times, Atlanta Journal & Constitution, the bulk of its members are drawn from the ranks of medium-sized circulation newspapers. Many members are newspapers owned by families with roots in the business going back four or more generations. Inland serves these members with its Family Owners and Next Generation Leadership conferences, held twice a year in the fall in association with its Annual Meeting and in mid-winter with the Key Executives Mega-Conference, which Inland co-sponsors with the Southern Newspaper Publishers Association and the Local Media Association.

Inland communicates with members and the newspaper industry at large through its monthly print newspaper, The Inlander, as well as its website and social media.

Its Foundation sponsors the Inland Fellowship Program, which pairs minority staffers at member newspapers with industry veterans in a three-year program that includes mentoring and participation in association conferences.

== History ==
The Inland Press Association first convened on May 7, 1885, in Chicago. The 19 publishers that first met at Chicago's Tremont House represented papers from Indiana, Illinois, Wisconsin, Michigan and Iowa.

Inland's founding in 1885 was motivated largely by the effect newsprint trusts were having on small newspaper publishers, who believed they could achieve better terms in an alliance. Three publishers, Robert Mann Woods of the Joliet Republic-Sun, E.A. Nattinger of the Ottawa Times and John W. Fornof of the Streator Free Press, called the first meeting. Many of the original members still retain Inland membership. One original family, the Bliss family in Janesville, Wisconsin, still participates actively in Inland.

Inland's research services developed during the early 20th century. The first cost and revenue study was conducted in 1920, though its roots date back to surveys dated around 1911. The precursor of the Newspaper Industry Compensation Survey, which was replaced by Publisher Benchmarks in 2014, was established in 1930. The first advertising linage reports were done in 1931.

For 2015, Inland Press Association's president is Cheryl Dell, publisher of the Sacramento Bee, and its president-elect is Mike Gugliotto, president and CEO of Seattle-based Pioneer News Group. Its executive director is Tom Slaughter.
