= Where (magazine) =

Where Magazine
- Categories: Tourism
- Frequency: monthly
- Circulation: 2,186,284
- Founded: 1938
- Company: Asia City Media Group (Asia); Morris Visitor Publications (global); St. Joseph Media (Canada)
- Country: Multiple (see prose)
- Based in: Toronto, Ontario, Canada, Augusta, Ga US
- Website: where.ca, Where Canada wheretraveler.com

Where is a series of magazines for tourists, distributed at hotels, convention centres, regional malls and other tourist areas.

== History ==
The original edition was founded in 1938.

== Publishers ==
Throughout most of the world, the magazine's editions are published by Morris Visitor Publications; it is published in London (UK) by The Tourism Media Group, owned by two long-standing Where Media executives Chris Johnson and Rob Way. Milan (Italy) by Where Italia Srl, in Rome by Tourist Media Srl, in Canada by St. Joseph Media and in Asia by Asia City Media Group.

== Editions ==
=== Asia ===
(all published by Asia City Media Group)

- Where Hong Kong (Hong Kong)
- Where Hong Kong Chinese edition (Hong Kong), aimed at Mainland Chinese tourists; launched in September 2012
- Where Macau (Macau) – launched in December 2003
- Where Singapore (Singapore)
- Where Thailand (Thailand) – launched in December 2011

=== Australia ===
(all published by Morris Visitor Publications)

- Where Sydney
- Where Melbourne
- Where Brisbane

=== Europe ===
(the majority published by Morris Visitor Publications)

- Where Berlin (Berlin, Germany)
- Where London (London, England)
- Where Milan (Milan, Italy), published by Where Italia srl, an editorial partnership between Morris Visitor Publications and Proedi, Milan (Italy), a leading publisher for the past 30 years in cross-media communication projects.
- Where Moscow (Moscow, Russia)
- Where Naples (Naples, Italy)
- Where Paris (Paris, France)
- Where Rome (Rome, Italy)
- Where St. Petersburg (Saint Petersburg, Russia)
- Where Venice (Venice, Italy), also published by Where Italia srl.

=== North America ===
(Note: Morris Visitor Publications USA website is down as of September 2023.)

==== Canada ====
(all published by St. Joseph Media, except as noted**)

- Where Calgary (Calgary, Alberta)
- Where Canada (ISSN 1711-456X; OCLC 55123936)
- Where Canadian Rockies (Banff, Canmore, Jasper, Kananaskis and Lake Louise, Alberta)
- Where Edmonton (Edmonton, Alberta)
- Where Halifax (Halifax, Nova Scotia) – published by Metro Guide Publishing
- Where Mississauga (Mississauga, Ontario)
- Where Montreal (Montreal, Quebec)**
- Where Muskoka (Muskoka and Parry Sound, Ontario)
- Where Ottawa (Ottawa, Ontario)
- Where Toronto (Toronto, Ontario)
- Where Vancouver (Vancouver, British Columbia)
- Where Victoria (Victoria, British Columbia)
- Where Whistler (Whistler, British Columbia)
- Where Winnipeg (Winnipeg, Manitoba)

==== United States ====
(all published by Morris Visitor Publications, except as noted**)

- Where Atlanta (Atlanta, Georgia)
- Where Boston (Boston, Massachusetts)**
- Where Baltimore (Baltimore, Maryland)
- Where Charleston (Charleston, South Carolina)
- Where Charlotte (Charlotte, North Carolina)
- Where Chicago (Chicago, Illinois)
- Where Dallas (Dallas, Texas)
- Where Indianapolis (Indianapolis, Indiana)
- Where Las Vegas (Las Vegas, Nevada)
- Where Miami (Miami, Florida)
- Where New Orleans (New Orleans, Louisiana)
- Where New York (New York City, New York)
- Where Orlando (Orlando, Florida)
- Where Philadelphia (Philadelphia, Pennsylvania)
- Where Phoenix (Phoenix, Arizona)
- Where San Francisco (San Francisco, California)
- Where Seattle (Seattle, Washington)
- Where St. Louis (St. Louis, Missouri)
- Where Twin Cities (Minneapolis – Saint Paul, Minnesota)
- Where Washington, D.C. (Washington, D.C.)

== See also ==
- List of travel magazines
