= Lawrence Journal-World =

Newspaper in Lawrence, Kansas

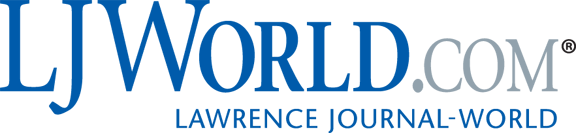
- Type: Daily newspaper
- Format: Broadsheet, online
- Owner: Ogden Newspapers
- Founded: March 2, 1892 (with heritage dating to 1858) (Note: Newspaper gives 1858 founding; however the Journal-World began publishing in 1911 after the Lawrence Journal (1880) and Lawrence World (1892) merged.)
- Headquarters: 1035 N 3rd Street, Lawrence, Kansas 66044; United States
- Circulation: 11,063
- OCLC number: 56972731
- Website: www.ljworld.com

The Lawrence Journal-World is a daily newspaper published in Lawrence, Kansas, United States, by Ogden Newspapers.

== History ==
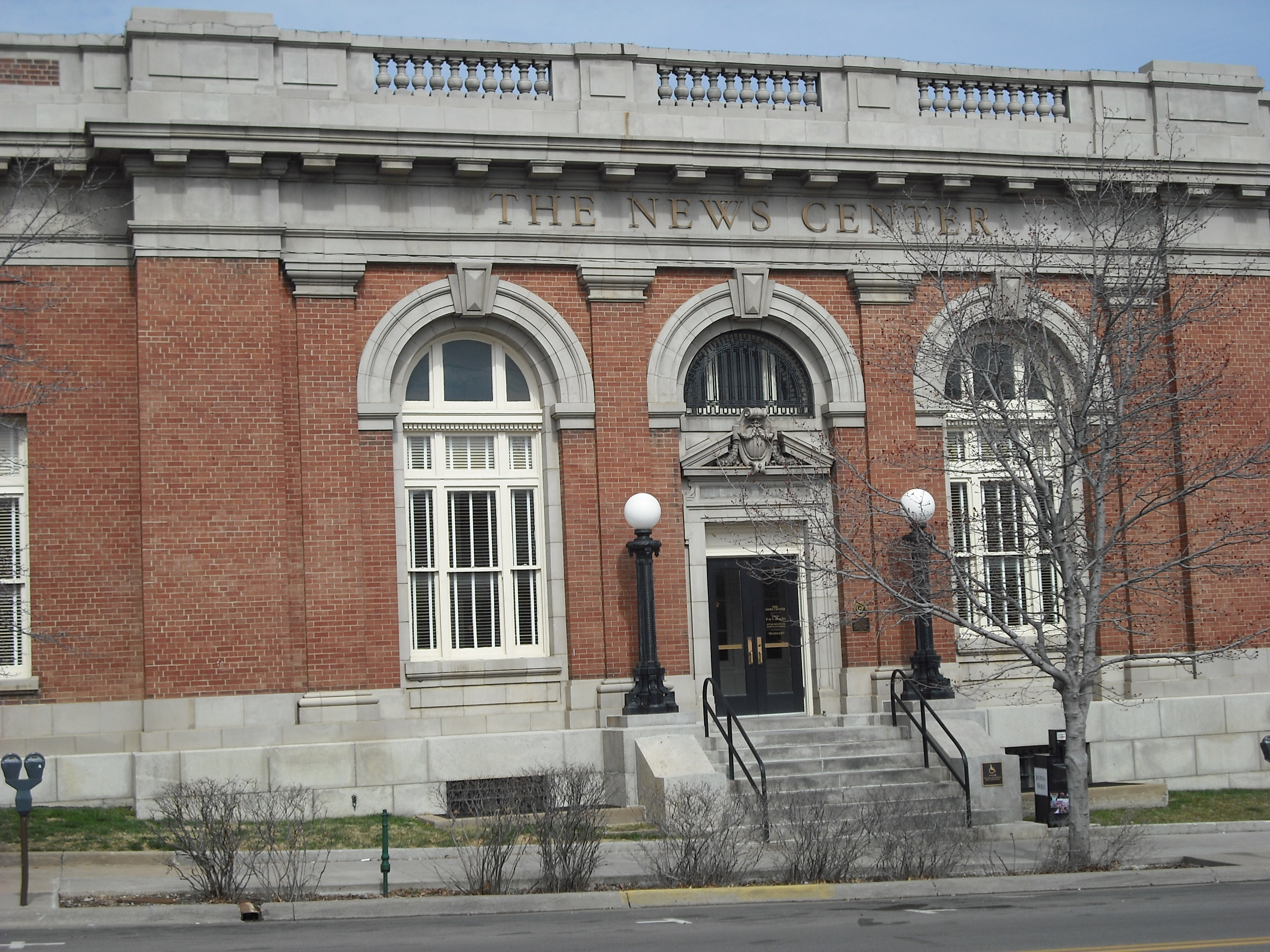
The former offices of the World Company, owner of the Lawrence Journal-World

Though the Journal-World title came into existence in 1911, the paper dates itself to 1858, according to the volume number of the current masthead.

In 1891, Wilford Collins Simons moved to Lawrence and took over the Lawrence Record operations under a three-month lease. The Lawrence World was first issued by Simons on March 2, 1892.

In 1905, the World acquired the Lawrence Journal, and merged the Journal and World in 1911 after a fire destroyed the offices of the Journal. The Lawrence Daily Journal title dates back to 1880, but was a continuation of the Republican Daily Journal which dates back to at least 1869. The Republican Daily Journal appears to have been the successor via the sale and/or consolidation of earlier Lawrence newspapers. One of those papers dated to 1858; for years, the Journal-World claimed an 1858 founding date.

Wilford Collins Simons served as editor from 1891 until he died in 1952. He handed the paper to his son, Dolph Simons Sr., who in turn passed it to Dolph Simons Jr.

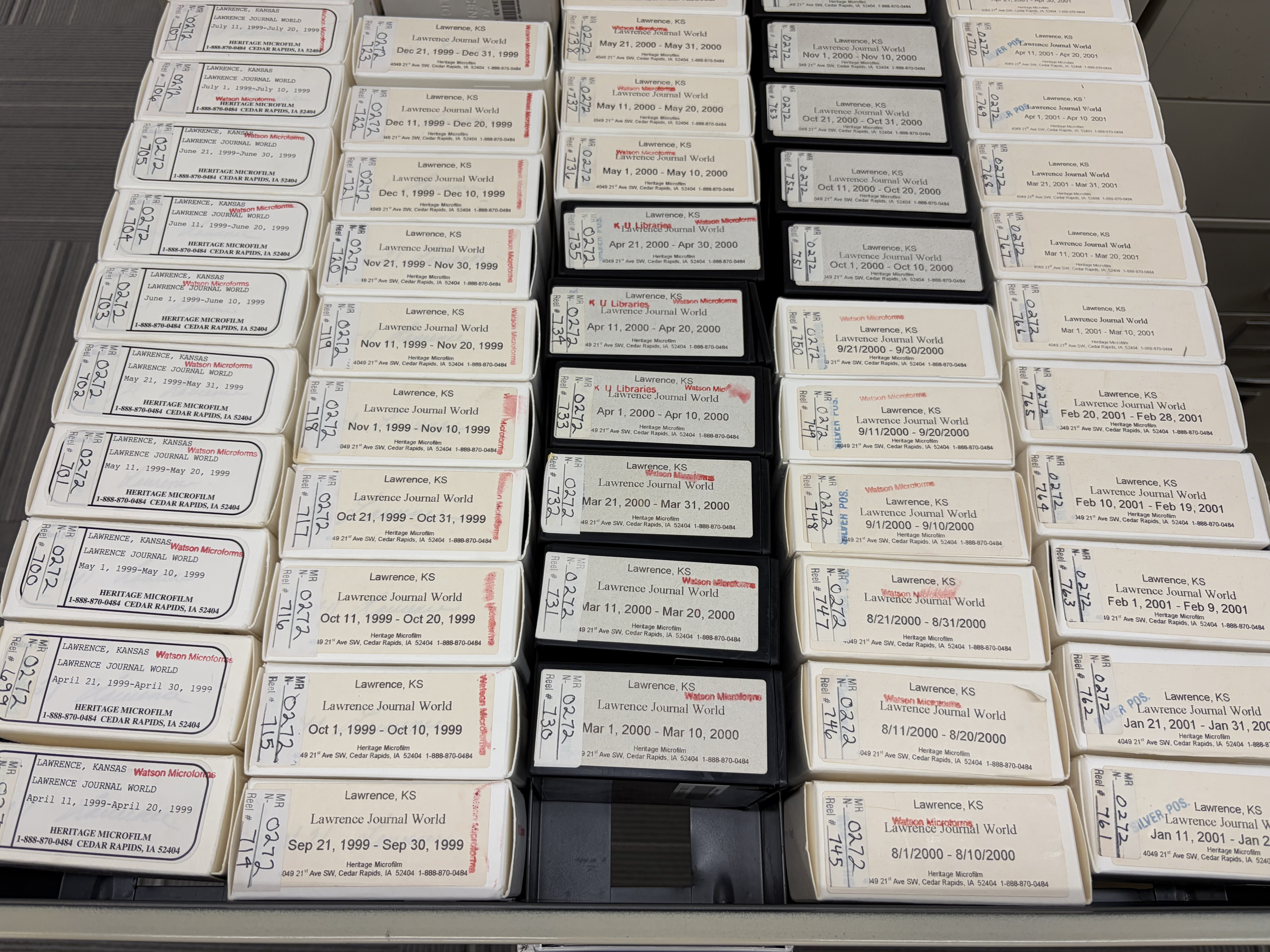
Microfilm archives of the LJ World in the Anschutz Library at the University of Kansas

In 2005, developers at the paper released the now-popular Django web framework.

In October 2010, the World Company, which owns the Lawrence Journal-World, sold some of its news media business to Internet and cable provider Knology for $165 million. The sale included 6 News, the Lawrence area's local television news channel.

In 2014, the on-site printing of the newspaper ended, with printing moving to The Kansas City Star's production facility in Kansas City, Missouri. Production, editing, and administrative functions remained in Lawrence.

In June 2016, the Simons family announced the sale of the Journal-World after 125 years of ownership, to another long-running family-owned company, Ogden Newspapers of Wheeling, West Virginia. Also in 2016, the family's WorldWest, LLC, which owned newspapers in Arizona (the Payson Roundup) and Colorado (the Steamboat Pilot & Today, and the Craig Daily Press), announced their sale to other owners.

In June 2018, the Journal-World's web site was migrated from Django to the blogging-centric content management system Wordpress.

On May 1, 2019, the Journal-World's offices moved from the historic post office building on 7th and New Hampshire Streets to an office in North Lawrence. The building is now occupied by Blue Cross Blue Shield of Kansas.

On May 16, 2020, the front page of the Journal-World announced that the newspaper would cease publication of all Monday print editions as of May 25.

On Sept. 28, 2020, the newsroom staff of the Journal-World publicly announced its plan to unionize as the Lawrence Journalism Workers Guild, or LJW Guild. Journal-World management and Ogden declined to voluntarily recognize the union through a card check. However, the journalists voted via a mail-in ballot election through the National Labor Relations Board, and after a count on Dec. 28, 2020, the guild voted to be represented by the United Media Guild, Local 34067 with The NewsGuild-CWA.

== Papers ==
- Baldwin City Signal: Baldwin City, Kansas
- Basehor Sentinel: Basehor, Kansas
- The Chieftain: Bonner Springs, Kansas
- The Dispatch: Shawnee, Kansas
- The Mirror: Tonganoxie, Kansas
- The De Soto ExplorerDe Soto, Kansas
- Eudora News: Eudora, Kansas

== See also ==
- List of newspapers in Kansas
