= 6News Lawrence =

- Country: United States
- Broadcast area: Lawrence, Kansas
- Headquarters: Lawrence, Kansas

Programming
- Picture format: 480i (SDTV)

Ownership
- Owner: The World Company (1972-2011); Knology (2011-2012); WOW! (2012-2017); Midco (2017)

History
- Launched: 1972; 53 years ago
- Closed: 4 August 2017; 8 years ago

Links
- Website: www.6lawrence.com (archived homepage on December 27th, 2016)

Channel 6 - Lawrence, KS was a 24-hour local information channel based in Lawrence, Kansas, which served Douglas County, Leavenworth County and Wyandotte County west of Interstate 435. Owned by Midco Communications, the channel was based at the company's corporate headquarters at New Hampshire and Seventh Street (near the offices for former sister newspaper, the Lawrence Journal-World) in downtown Lawrence. Previously, the channel was called 6 News Lawrence. Newscasts ceased after Midco Communications bought the organization in July 2017.

It was carried on Midco cable channel 6 in high definition throughout the provider's service area (which in addition to Lawrence, also included the communities of Eudora, Tonganoxie, Lecompton, Basehor, and the Piper (formerly a township) neighborhood of Kansas City, Kansas.

== History ==
6News was originally launched by The World Company (parent company of the Lawrence Journal-World) in 1972 was provider as an exclusive service of Sunflower CableVision (later Sunflower Broadband). As part of the sale of Sunflower Broadband, 6News was sold to cable overbuilder Knology in October 2010, sold some of their news media business to internet and cable provider Knology for $165 million.

The channel was subsequently acquired by Wide Open West on April 18, 2012, as part of the company's $750 million purchase of Knology.

Channel 6 News aired its last news broadcast on August 4, 2017. Its new owner, Midco, purchased the company from WOW! Broadband on January 13, 2017. Channel 6 currently broadcasts Midco's Dakota sports network, while a localized version of the network was launched on channel 32 on November 1, 2017.

== Programming ==
6 News' primary programming consisted of locally produced newscasts focusing on the Lawrence area, under the title WOW! 6 News, which aired Monday through Friday evenings at 5:00, 6:00, 8:00 and 10:00 p.m. Other local programs featured on the channel include the trivia game show 1 on 1 Trivia; sports programs The Drive (featuring sports highlights and game discussion) and Varsity Showcase (focusing on high school athletics); talk shows The Not So Late Show (which maintained a late-night talk show format), Town Topic and Business Spotlight; and lifestyle programs Jayni's Kitchen (formatted as a cooking series) and Final Fridays Preview (focusing on northeast Kansas' art community, and previewing that month's "Final Fridays" event in downtown Lawrence). The channel also broadcast high school football games involving Lawrence area teams on Friday evenings during September and October. The channel was discontinued in August 2017.
