= KMAJ-FM =

Radio station in Carbondale–Topeka, Kansas

- Carbondale, Kansas; United States
- Broadcast area: Topeka metro
- Frequency: 107.7 MHz
- Branding: Majic 107.7

Programming
- Format: Adult contemporary

Ownership
- Owner: Cumulus Media; (Cumulus Licensing LLC)
- Sister stations: KDVV, KMAJ, KTOP-FM, KTOP, KWIC

History
- First air date: July 1, 1971
- Former call signs: KEWI-FM (1971, CP); KSWT (1971–1981); KMAJ (1981–1990)
- Call sign meaning: "Kansas Majic"

Technical information
- Licensing authority: FCC
- Facility ID: 42012
- Class: C1
- ERP: 100,000 watts
- HAAT: 235 meters (771 ft)
- Transmitter coordinates: 38°57′15″N 95°54′43″W

Links
- Public license information: Public file; LMS
- Webcast: Listen live; Listen live (via iHeartRadio)
- Website: kmaj.com

KMAJ-FM (107.7 FM, "Majic 107.7") is a commercial radio station licensed to Carbondale, Kansas, and serving the Topeka metropolitan area. Owned by Cumulus Media, it airs an adult contemporary format with studios located within Cumulus’ Kansas City cluster in Overland Park (alongside its sister Topeka stations).

The transmitter is on SW Davis Road at SW 61st Street in Dover.

== History ==
The station signed on the air on July 1, 1971. Its original call sign was KSWT. It aired a beautiful music format, programming quarter-hour sweeps of instrumentals with occasional soft vocals, and calling itself "K-Sweet". The music was played from large 10-inch reels of audio tape, while the rest of the programming elements came from cart carousels within a Harris automation system. There were no "live" announcers in the early years.

As time went by, more vocals were added in an effort to appeal to younger listeners. In 1981, KSWT-FM eliminated nearly all instrumentals, becoming a soft adult contemporary station. It changed its call letters to KMAJ and rebranded as "Magic 108". In 1990, the -FM suffix was added to the station's call sign, as an AM sister station in Topeka at 1440 kHz took the KMAJ call letters. With KMAJ-FM moving into the 2000s, the tempo of the music picked up, making the transition to mainstream adult contemporary music.

Each year, KMAJ plays Christmas music for the weeks leading into the holiday. In 2013, it flipped earlier, and was the first station in Kansas to air holiday music weeks before Christmas Day. In 2017 the station switched on November 16. In 2020, during the COVID-19 pandemic, the station flipped to all Christmas music on November 10.

Long time morning hosts John Lee Hooker and Mike Manns retired in 2018 after 32 years on-air together. Veronica Rates currently hosts the station's morning show.

== See also ==
- KMAJ (AM)
