= The Topeka Capital-Journal =

Newspaper in Topeka, Kansas

- Type: Daily newspaper
- Format: Broadsheet
- Owner: USA Today Co.
- Publisher: Stephen Wade
- Editor: Tomari Quinn
- Founded: Topeka Daily Capital: 1879 (with heritage dating to 1858); Topeka State Journal: 1873; Topeka Capital-Journal: 1981
- Headquarters: 100 SE 9th Street, Suite 500; Topeka, Kansas 66612; USA
- Circulation: 18,388
- Website: www.cjonline.com

The Topeka Capital-Journal is a daily newspaper in Topeka, Kansas, owned by the USA Today Co.

== History ==
The paper was formed following numerous name changes and mergers, including the merger of The Topeka Daily Capital and The Topeka State Journal.

=== Timeline ===
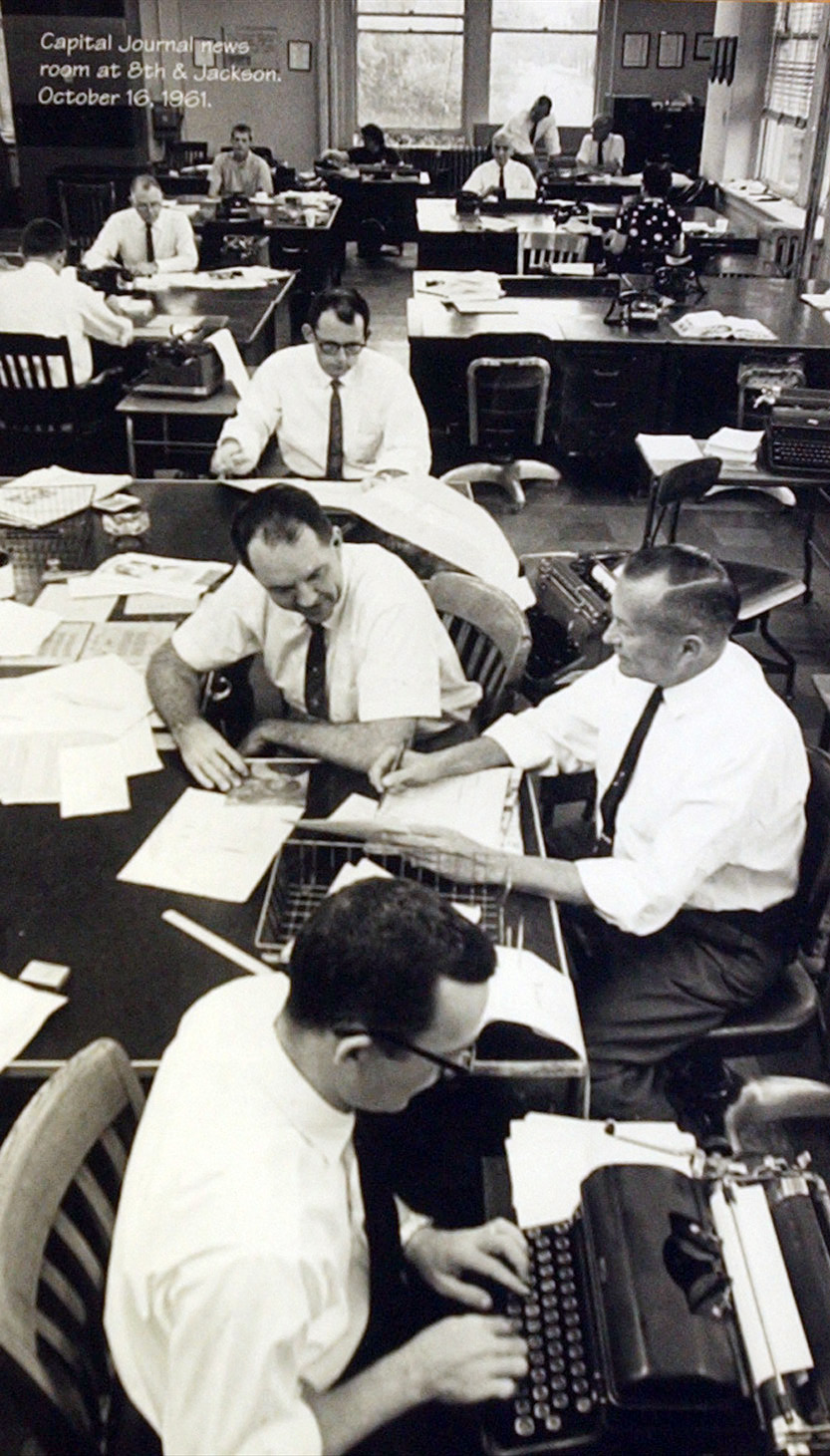
Capital-Journal newsroom, 1961

- 1858: The Kansas State Record starts publishing.
- 1873: The Topeka Blade is founded by J. Clarke Swayze.
- 1879: George W. Reed buys the Blade and changes its name to The Kansas State Journal.
- 1879: The Topeka Daily Capital is founded by Major J.K. Hudson as an evening paper but changes to morning in 1881.
- 1885: Frank P. MacLennan buys the Journal and renames it The Topeka State Journal.
- 1888: The Capital absorbs the Commonwealth, owned by Floyd Perry Baker and his sons, who had earlier bought the Kansas State Record.
- 1899: Frederick Oliver Popenoe buys a 51 percent controlling interest in the Capital.
- 1900: Charles M. Sheldon, saying "Newspapers should be operated as Christ would operate them," sends the Capital circulation skyrocketing from 12,000 to 387,000, forcing it to print papers in New York and Chicago.
- 1901: Arthur Capper buys the Capital and becomes sole owner in 1904.
- 1940: Oscar S. Stauffer buys the Journal.
- 1951: Capper dies, and the Capital become employee-owned.
- 1956: Stauffer Communications buys Capper Publications, including the Capital.
- 1962: Former MacLennan home Cedar Crest becomes the Kansas governor's mansion.
- 1973: Brian Lanker wins the 1973 Pulitzer Prize for Feature Photography for a series of photos of a childbirth, as exemplified by the image titled "Moment of Life".
- 1975: Susan Ford (daughter of Gerald Ford) and Chris Johns (future editor of National Geographic magazine) intern at paper during the summer.
- 1981: Stauffer Communications merges the Capital and the Journal into The Topeka Capital-Journal, distributed in the morning.
- 1982: Former owner Oscar S. Stauffer dies at 95.
- 1994: Stauffer Communications merges with Morris Communications.
- 2017: Morris Communications sells its newspapers to GateHouse Media.
- 2019: GateHouse Media's corporate parent company, New Media Investment Group, announces that it will acquire Gannett and assume its name.
- 2023: The paper announces it's switching from carrier to mail delivery via the U.S. Postal Service.

== See also ==
- List of newspapers in Kansas
