= KTOP (AM) =

Radio station in Topeka, Kansas, United States

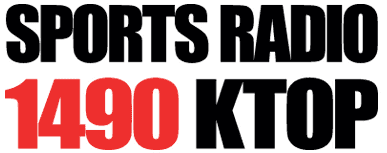
- Topeka, Kansas; United States
- Frequency: 1490 kHz
- Branding: SportsRadio 1490 KTOP

Programming
- Format: Sports
- Affiliations: Westwood One Sports

Ownership
- Owner: Cumulus Media; (Cumulus Licensing LLC)
- Sister stations: KDVV; KMAJ; KMAJ-FM; KTOP-FM; KWIC

History
- First air date: July 1947
- Call sign meaning: "Topeka"

Technical information
- Licensing authority: FCC
- Facility ID: 62236
- Class: C
- Power: 1,000 watts unlimited
- Transmitter coordinates: 39°04′39″N 95°40′46″W

Links
- Public license information: Public file; LMS
- Webcast: Listen live; Listen live (via iHeartRadio)
- Website: www.ktop1490.com

KTOP (1490 kHz) is an AM radio station serving the Topeka, Kansas, metropolitan area. The station broadcasts a sports format. KTOP is owned by Cumulus Media and licensed to Cumulus Licensing LLC. The transmitter and antenna are located in northern Topeka on NW Buchanan Street near the Kansas River.

KTOP went on the air in 1947 as the second radio station for the Topeka area. After years as a Top 40 station, it flipped to country music and then oldies. For most of the 1990s into the 2000s, it broadcast an adult standards format.

== History ==
On January 5, 1946, a partnership of T. Hall Collison and Norville G. Wingate, both World War II veterans, filed an application with the Federal Communications Commission (FCC) to build a new radio station in Topeka, originally proposing studios in the Kansan Hotel in downtown Topeka. The FCC approved the application on March 20, 1947, and after a modification to specify a different studio site, the station began broadcasting in July 1947. That timing made it the second radio station in Topeka and the first of two to arrive in the city in the same year, the other being WREN (1250 AM), which had been located in Lawrence until moving to Topeka. To get the KTOP call letters, the FCC selected the Topeka station over a new outlet being built in Monterey, California and another in Las Cruces, New Mexico.

KTOP was affiliated with the Mutual Broadcasting System. Within months, Wingate sold his stake to Collison, opting to retire due to poor health. Charles B. Axton bought KTOP from Collison in 1950. During the Great Flood of 1951, the United States Air Force airlifted a transmitter to the station's studios, as its normal transmitter location had flooded out and there was a pressing need to restore radio service in the Topeka area. A 1958 storm toppled the station's tower; the station was back on air within 23 hours, beating the 24 hours it took to put it back into service after the 1951 flood.

Harris Publications acquired the station in August 1963; that December, Axton died in a Topeka hospital at the age of 53. Harris increased the station's power from 250 to 1,000 watts in 1965.

In 1977, KTOP switched from Top 40 to automated country music. The format was short-lived, and the station flipped to oldies in 1979. UNO Broadcasting purchased KTOP and KDVV in 1987. In 1991, the AM station switched from oldies to adult standards.

Meanwhile, WREN went off the air due to financial issues in 1987. UNO Broadcasting attempted to buy that frequency in 1989; it would have moved KTOP's programming and call sign to 1250 kHz and divested the 1490 frequency to another company, Barr Broadcasting. However, the owner of UNO Broadcasting—Robert Tezak, the one-time owner of the card game Uno—fell into financial trouble as a result of an unrelated court case. In 1987, he was alleged to have ordered the arson of a bowling alley he owned in order to collect insurance payments. While awaiting trial in that case, he was arrested for intimidating a witness—his former wife—by sending her a death threat. When a court ordered him to put aside $400,000 in restitution after being convicted in March 1994, he filed bankruptcy for himself, his wife, and three businesses, one of them UNO Broadcasting. The filings were made in large part to try to regain control of the radio stations, which had been placed in court-appointed receivership.

Frederick Reynolds Sr. acquired the station out of bankruptcy in 1994 as part of a $750,000 sale with KDVV. In 1995, Frederick Reynolds sold the station and KMAJ to his son, Frederick Reynolds Jr., for $75,000. The cluster of four stations owned by the Reynolds family was sold to Cumulus for $10.425 million in 1998.

The station ditched its standards format at the start of 2000 to switch to classic country, only to revert to standards the next year.

KTOP became a sports station on October 4, 2007. It joined the new CBS Sports Radio network on January 2, 2013, having previously been an ESPN Radio outlet.
