= KWIC (FM) =

- Topeka, Kansas; United States
- Broadcast area: Topeka, Kansas and Douglas County, KS & Osage County, KS
- Frequency: 99.3 MHz
- Branding: 99.3 the Eagle

Programming
- Format: Classic hits
- Affiliations: Premiere Networks; United Stations Radio Networks; Westwood One

Ownership
- Owner: Cumulus Media; (Cumulus Licensing LLC)
- Sister stations: KDVV, KMAJ-FM, KMAJ, KTOP, KTOP-FM

History
- First air date: 1992 (as KESC-FM)
- Former call signs: KESC-FM (1992–1996)
- Call sign meaning: KWICk (after its previous moniker, "Quick 99.3")

Technical information
- Licensing authority: FCC
- Facility ID: 39997
- Class: C2
- ERP: 19,000 watts
- HAAT: 164 meters
- Transmitter coordinates: 39.0639°N 95.7639°W

Links
- Public license information: Public file; LMS
- Webcast: Listen Live; Listen Live via iHeart
- Website: www.eagle993.com

KWIC (99.3 MHz) is an American FM radio station broadcasting a classic hits format. Licensed to Topeka, Kansas, U.S., the station is currently owned by Cumulus Media.

== Programming ==
Since the 2014-15 season, KWIC, along with KMAJ (AM) (1440), are home to the Kansas Jayhawks football and basketball (men/women's) teams. Previously, the games had been aired on WIBW (AM) (580).
