= KMAJ (AM) =

- Topeka, Kansas; United States
- Broadcast area: Topeka metropolitan area
- Frequency: 1440 kHz
- Branding: The Big Talker 93.5 FM / 1440 AM

Programming
- Format: Talk radio
- Network: Fox News Radio
- Affiliations: NBC News Radio; Compass Media Networks; Premiere Networks; Westwood One

Ownership
- Owner: Cumulus Media; (Cumulus Licensing LLC)
- Sister stations: KDVV; KMAJ-FM; KTOP-FM; KTOP; KWIC

History
- First air date: July 1947; 78 years ago (as KJAY)
- Former call signs: KJAY (1947–1962); KEWI (1962–1980); KSKX (1980–1986); KEWI (1986–1990)
- Call sign meaning: from its sister station KMAJ-FM

Technical information
- Licensing authority: FCC
- Facility ID: 42014
- Class: B
- Power: 5,000 watts day; 1,000 watts night
- Transmitter coordinates: 39°01′07″N 95°34′22.9″W
- Translator: 93.5 K228FW (Topeka)

Links
- Public license information: Public file; LMS
- Webcast: Listen live
- Website: Official website

KMAJ (1440 kHz) is a commercial AM radio station in Topeka, Kansas. It is owned by Cumulus Media and it broadcasts a talk radio format, calling itself "The Big Talker". The studios and offices are located within Cumulus’ Kansas City cluster in Overland Park (alongside its sister Topeka stations).

By day, KMAJ is powered at 5,000 watts. At night, to protect other stations on 1440 AM from interference, it reduces power to 1,000 watts. It uses a directional antenna with a four-tower array. The transmitter is on SE Ratner Road near SE 29th Street in Tecumseh, Kansas. Programming is also heard on 250-watt FM translator K228FW at 93.5 MHz in Topeka.

== Programming ==
Most weekday programming is nationally syndicated talk shows. Mornings begin with America in the Morning followed by Armstrong & Getty, The Vince Show with Vince Coglianese, The Guy Benson Show, The Mark Levin Show, The Chris Plante Show, America Tonight with Rich Valdes and Red Eye Radio. Weekends feature specialty shows on money, health, real estate, movies and repeats of weekday shows. Most hours begin with an update from Fox News Radio.

Beginning with the 2014–15 season, KMAJ and KWIC became the home of the Kansas Jayhawks football and basketball (men/women's) teams. Previously, the games had been aired on WIBW. In addition, KMAJ also carries local high school football and basketball games.

== History ==
=== KJAY ===
The station signed on the air in July 1947 as KJAY. It called itself "The Jayhawker Station", representing the Kansas Jayhawks sports teams of the University of Kansas. KJAY was owned by S.H. Patterson with studios at 908 Kansas Avenue. As other stations in Topeka and Kansas City had taken the major network affiliations, KJAY was an independent station, coming up with its own programs.

In the 1950s and early 1960s, KJAY featured a full service format of middle of the road (MOR) music, along with personalities, sports, farm information and news.

=== KEWI and KSKX ===
In March 1962, Fred Reynolds, dba Midland Broadcasters, Inc., acquired KJAY. He immediately changed the call sign to KEWI and flipped the format to Top 40 hits. Reynolds brought in some of consultant Gordon McLendon's "Raiders" (high-energy DJs) to make a big splash on "Big KeeWee". By the late 1960s, these "KeeWee Good Guys" had made KEWI the city's top-rated station. The weekly Top 20+20 Tunedex survey evolved into a Fab 40 Tunedex to go with the British Invasion and then to a Top 14+40 Tunedex to match its dial position at 1440 kHz.

By the 1980s, young people were tuning in FM stations to hear their favorite hits. In September 1980, KEWI changed its format to country music. It used the slogan "Kix Country" with the call letters KSKX. Then, to capitalize on the popularity of the "Retro" craze, the KEWI call letters came back in November 1986.

=== KMAJ ===
By 1990, as most music formats had moved to the FM dial, KEWI changed call letters to KMAJ to simulcast its FM sister station, KMAJ-FM.

Cumulus bought KMAJ-AM-FM from Midland Broadcasters in February 1999, and began simulcasting syndicated talk shows and programming with KMBZ in Kansas City.

Former logo

== See also ==
- KMAJ-FM
