= WIBW-FM =

Radio station in Topeka, Kansas

Coordinates: 39.0261°N 95.9172°W

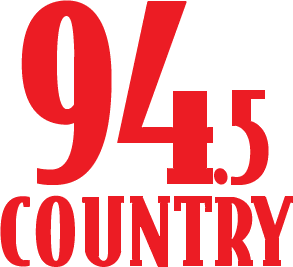
- Topeka, Kansas; United States
- Broadcast area: Topeka metropolitan area
- Frequency: 94.5 MHz
- Branding: The BIG 94.5 Country

Programming
- Format: Country
- Affiliations: Westwood One

Ownership
- Owner: Connoisseur Media; (Alpha Media Licensee LLC)
- Sister stations: KSAJ; KTPK; WIBW (AM)

History
- First air date: September 1, 1961 (at 97.3 MHz)
- Former frequencies: 97.3 MHz (1961–2002)
- Call sign meaning: None, sequentially assigned to AM station (Note: A folk etymology has developed ("What's In a Name? Radio Knows" (AP, Kansas City) by Jim Bagby, Manhattan (Kansas) Mercury, June 27, 1985, p. 7.) that when Arthur Capper bought the station in 1929, he chose the WIBW call letters to match a supposed original owner of "Indiana Broadcast Works". However, WIBW had actually been assigned this call sign, randomly from a sequential list, when it was first licensed three years and a half years before Capper purchased it. There is also no evidence that an entity named "Indiana Broadcast Works" ever existed.)

Technical information
- Licensing authority: FCC
- Facility ID: 63174
- Class: C0
- ERP: 100,000 watts
- HAAT: 351 meters (1,152 ft)

Links
- Public license information: Public file; LMS
- Webcast: Listen live
- Website: www.94country.com

WIBW-FM (94.5 MHz) is a commercial FM radio station in Topeka, Kansas. It is owned by Connoisseur Media and airs a country radio format. The studios and offices are on SW Executive Drive in Topeka. The transmitter is off Windy Hill Road in Maple Hill. WIBW-FM broadcasts at 100,000 watts.

The station serves as the primary Emergency Alert System station for the state of Kansas along with sister station KTPK. WIBW-FM, along with co-owned WIBW and one-time sister station WIBW-TV, are unusual in having call signs beginning with a "W", while all other stations in Kansas have "K" call signs. The reason is that the AM station was originally established in Indiana in 1925, a state in W territory. WIBW kept its call letters when it moved to Topeka, which it has kept to this day. In addition, the Federal Communications Commission allows co-owned FM and TV stations to share the same call sign, even if the call letters do not conform to current policy for that state.

== History ==
=== Rock and Top 40 days ===
On September 1, 1961, WIBW-FM signed on the air at 97.3 MHz. It was owned by the Topeka Broadcasting Association, a subsidiary of Stauffer Publications. The company also owned WIBW (580 AM) and WIBW-TV, along with a daily newspaper, The Topeka Capital-Journal. At first, WIBW-FM simulcast the AM station, though in the late 1960s, the FCC was encouraging AM-FM radio stations to offer different programming. WIBW-FM switched to an album rock format known as "Rock 97 and "The Rock of Kansas".

Over time, the rock hits format moved in the direction of Top 40, promoted as "97fm". The FM studio was across the hall from the control room which managed both the AM station and the Kansas City Royals radio network when WIBW held the baseball team's broadcast rights.

=== Country music ===
In 1990, WIBW-FM flipped to country music. The station became known for a bright red remote truck which looked like a boombox.

The WIBW-AM-FM-TV studios for decades were located at 5600 SW 6th in West Topeka. That building received heavy damage from a fire on January 5, 2012.

Until 2002, WIBW-FM was located at 97.3 MHz. The station moved its frequency to 94.5 MHz to make way for a new move-in station in Kansas City.

In May 2025, Connoisseur Media announced its intent to acquire Alpha Media. The FCC approved the sale on August 13, 2025, and the sale was consummated on September 4.

=== St. Jude's Hospital and other events ===
Each year, WIBW-FM holds a radiothon where all proceeds go to St. Jude Children's Research Hospital in Memphis, Tennessee. It is usually run on a Thursday and Friday in February, from 6 a.m. to 7 p.m., at a Hy-Vee supermarket at 29th and Wanamaker in Topeka. DJs do there programs from the store. Interviews are conducted with "ambassador families" during the broadcast, telling how they benefited from the St. Jude's Hospital.

WIBW-FM also sponsors the annual Country Stampede Music Festival, where all proceeds go to benefit St. Jude Children's Research Hospital.

== See also ==
- WIBW-TV
- Country Stampede Music Festival
