= KTOP-FM =

Radio station in Topeka, Kansas

Simulcast of KCMO, Kansas City, Missouri
- St. Marys, Kansas; United States
- Broadcast area: Topeka metropolitan area
- Frequency: 102.9 MHz
- Branding: KCMO Talk Radio

Programming
- Format: News/talk
- Network: Fox News Radio
- Affiliations: Westwood One; KCTV (weather)

Ownership
- Owner: Cumulus Media; (Cumulus Licensing LLC)
- Sister stations: KDVV; KMAJ; KMAJ-FM; KTOP; KWIC

History
- First air date: December 4, 1994
- Former call signs: KTPQ (CP, 1993–1994); KQTP (1994–2009)
- Call sign meaning: Topeka

Technical information
- Licensing authority: FCC
- Facility ID: 60034
- Class: C2
- ERP: 30,000 watts
- HAAT: 182.2 meters (598 ft)
- Transmitter coordinates: 39.064°N 95.764°W

Links
- Public license information: Public file; LMS
- Webcast: Listen live; Listen live (via iHeartRadio)
- Website: www.kcmotalkradio.com

KTOP-FM (102.9 MHz) is a commercial radio station licensed to St. Marys, Kansas, United States and serving the Topeka metropolitan area. It is owned by Cumulus Media and broadcasts a conservative talk radio format simulcasting KCMO from Kansas City, Missouri. The studios are located within Cumulus’ Kansas City cluster in Overland Park (alongside its sister Topeka stations).

KTOP-FM's transmitter is located off SW Wanamaker Road in Topeka, near Kaw River State Park and the Kansas River.

== History ==
The station signed on the air on December 4, 1994. While it was still a construction permit, it had the call sign KTPQ. But by the time it debuted, its call letters were KQTP. It was the FM sister station to KTOP in Topeka. KQTP had an oldies format and was owned by Shawnee Broadcasting. In 2009, it changed its call letters to match its sister station, as KTOP-FM.

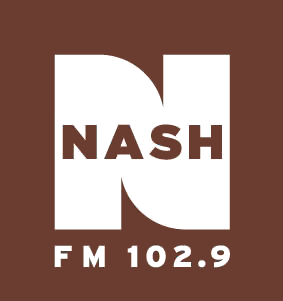
Logo as "Nash FM 102.9"

On October 31, 2014, KTOP-FM rebranded as "Nash FM 102.9". On December 21, 2015, KTOP-FM began calling itself "102.9 Nash Icon".

On September 13, 2021, KTOP-FM dropped its Nash branding, and rebranded as "102.9 Cat Country".

On June 8, 2026, at noon, after playing "With a Woman You Love" by Justin Moore, KTOP-FM abruptly dropped the country format and began simulcasting the conservative talk radio format of KCMO in Kansas City, with Cumulus performing the move to help provide a Topeka home for the local broadcasts on KCMO, intending to expand their audience to another city. It also gives Cumulus two talk stations in the Topeka market, along with KMAJ.

== See also ==
- KTOP (AM)
