= Oscar S. Stauffer =

American news executive (1886–1982)

- Born: Oscar Stanley Stauffer; November 26, 1886; Hope, Kansas, U.S.
- Died: February 24, 1982 (aged 95); Scottsdale, Arizona, U.S.

Oscar Stanley Stauffer (November 26, 1886 – February 24, 1982) was the founder of the media company Stauffer Communications and is often credited with starting the bandwagon for Kansas Governor Alf Landon getting the Republican nomination for President of the United States in 1936.

At the time of his death, Stauffer owned 20 newspapers, two television stations, nine radio stations and several affiliated operations in 11 states.

In 1886, Stauffer was born in Hope, Kansas. After graduating from Emporia High School (Emporia, Kansas) in 1906, Stauffer went to work for William Allen White at the Emporia Gazette for $6/week. White fired him in 1908 to force him to attend the journalism school at the University of Kansas. After graduating from college, he worked five years at The Kansas City Star.

In 1915, he bought his first newspaper, the Peabody Gazette-Herald in Peabody, Kansas, and was editor until 1922. He eventually bought five other newspapers, and merged them into Stauffer Publications in 1930.

In 1935, Stauffer encountered Kansas City Star editor Roy Roberts and is reported to have asked him, "Look here Roy, when are going to do something about getting Alf nominated?" Shortly thereafter, Roberts, Stauffer, Kansas City Star reporter Laci Haynes and Pittsburg, Kansas publisher Fred Brinkerhoff chipped in $500 each to open an "Alf Landon For President" campaign headquarters in the Muehlebach Hotel in Kansas City, Missouri. Rather than printing any stationery, the publishers used the letterhead of Arkansas City Daily Traveler in Arkansas City, Kansas.

In 1975, the Kansas State High School Activities Association began the Oscar Stauffer Award, which each year honors a sports broadcaster and newspaper reporter for their outstanding coverage of high school athletics in the state.

In 1982, Oscar died at the age of 95, and was buried at Mount Hope Cemetery in Topeka, Kansas.
