= Morris Communications =

American media company

- Type: Private
- Industry: Media
- Founded: 1945
- Founder: William S. Morris Jr.
- Headquarters: Augusta, Georgia
- Key people: William S. Morris III, chairman; William S. Morris IV, vice president; Derek May, president of Newspapers; Craig S. Mitchell, president and CEO; Terry K. House Jr., assistant secretary and tax director; Susie Morris Baker, VP; J. Tyler Morris, VP
- Products: Magazines
- Website: morris.com

Morris Communications is an American privately-held media company headquartered in Augusta, Georgia. It owns magazine publishing, outdoor advertising, book publishing and distribution, visitor publications, and online services.

Morris Communications is the parent company of Morris Media Network. Morris Media Network consists of city magazines and special-interest magazines including travel. Morris brands include Alaska Magazine, American Angler, Skirt!, The Milepost, Western Horseman, and the Where series for travelers.

Morris Communications is separate from Morris Multimedia, which was founded by Charles H. Morris, a member of the same family that founded Morris Communications.

== History ==
William S. Morris Jr. began working in the media industry in 1929 when he got a job as a bookkeeper at the Augusta Chronicle. He and his wife bought stock in the paper in 1945 and founded Southeastern Newspapers, Inc. They bought the remaining shares of the Chronicle in 1955, and expanded with the purchase of the Augusta Herald. Their son William S. "Billy" Morris III joined the company in 1956. Additional newspapers in Georgia were added in the coming years. Billy was appointed president of the company in 1966, and the name was changed to Morris Communications Corp. in 1970.

The company continued to expand, adding interests radio and television as well as newspapers in Alaska, Florida, and Texas. The company purchased Florida Publishing Co., owners of The Florida Times-Union and The St. Augustine Record, on January 1, 1983. The company expanded into outdoor advertising in 1985 with the purchase of Naegele Outdoor Advertising, which they renamed Fairway Outdoor Advertising in 1991 after selling various units to other companies. In 1995, they expanded into Kansas by acquiring Stauffer Communications, which had a portfolio of newspapers and TV and radio stations. They added travel guides starting with the acquisition of Best Read Guide Franchise Corp in 1997, and added Guest Informant in 2001. They acquired The London Guide and the be IN series from the publishers NBC in London. They then expanded with the takeover of Where in 2004. Another subsidiary, Morris Publications Ltd. UK, was created in 1998, when Cadogan Guides of London was purchased. They acquired London This Week, renaming it the London Planner.

Morris Publishing Group (MPG) was formed in 2001 as a wholly owned subsidiary of Morris Communications to handle the newspaper side of the corporation. MPG published twelve daily newspapers, eleven non-daily papers, and numerous free community newspapers in the US. In 2017, the MPG division and its portfolio of newspapers was sold to GateHouse Media for $120M. Included in the sale were Augusta Chronicle, Savannah Morning News, Athens Banner-Herald, Florida Times-Union, St. Augustine Record, Lubbock Avalanche-Journal, Amarillo Globe-News, Topeka Capital-Journal, Log Cabin Democrat, Juneau Empire, and Peninsula Clarion.

Since 2022, Morris Communications has been the owner of the Nashville Stampede, one of ten bull riding teams in the Professional Bull Riders Team Series, which runs every summer and autumn in the United States. The Nashville Stampede won the inaugural PBR Team Series Championship title that year.

== Challenges ==
With the decline of the newspaper industry, Morris Communications cut employee wages in 2009 to prevent further layoffs.

In 2010, Morris Publishing Group filed a pre-packaged Chapter 11 bankruptcy reorganization with $415 million in debt.

On May 18, 2015, Morris announced that it had sold its 36 radio stations to Alpha Media.

On October 14, 2015, it was revealed that Morris Communications Company VP of audience sent a company-wide email to maintain specific editorial positions to make a political point. This has put the organization into question relating to its ethics. Further issues arose with Morris Communications' failure to respond for comment.

In 2004, Morris unsuccessfully brought suit against PGA Tour, alleging that PGA Tour violated section 2 of the Sherman Act, codified at 15 U.S.C. § 2, by monopolizing the markets for (1) the publication of compiled real-time golf scores on the Internet, and (2) the sale, or syndication of those scores. In addition, Morris alleged that PGA Tour further violated section 2 of the Sherman Act by refusing to deal with Morris. The district court granted summary judgment in favor of PGA Tour because it found, inter alia, that PGA Tour had a valid business justification for its actions.
