= List of newspapers formerly owned by Berkshire Hathaway =

The following is a list of newspapers formerly owned by Berkshire Hathaway.

Nearly all were sold to Lee Enterprises in 2020.

- The Bryan-College Station Eagle
- The Buffalo News
- Culpeper Star-Exponent
- The Daily Progress
- Dothan Eagle
- The Free Lance–Star
- Independent Tribune
- Martinsville Bulletin
- The McDowell News
- The Morning News
- The News & Advance
- The News Herald, North Carolina
- The News Virginian
- Omaha World-Herald
- Opelika-Auburn News
- The Press of Atlantic City
- The Reidsville Review
- Richmond Times-Dispatch
- The Roanoke Times
- Statesville Record & Landmark
- Tulsa World
- Waco Tribune-Herald
- Winston-Salem Journal
