= Hanford Sentinel =

Weekly newspaper published in Santa Maria, California

- Type: Weekly newspaper
- Owner: Santa Maria California News Media Inc.
- Founder(s): Frank L. Dodge; David Dodge
- Founded: 1886
- Language: English
- Headquarters: 421 E 6th St, Hanford, CA 93230
- OCLC number: 27696061
- Website: hanfordsentinel.com

The Hanford Sentinel is a weekly newspaper in Hanford, California.

== History ==
The first issue of the Hanford Sentinel was published on Feb. 4, 1886. It was a Republican paper founded by brothers Frank L. Dodge and David Dodge. The two sold the paper in 1897 to J.E. Richmond.

Richmond operated the Sentinel for over four decades. In 1940, he sold the paper to a group of three men, including Stanley Beaubaire, who was named editor and publisher. Beaubaire bought the Chico Record in 1945 and sold it two years later.

In 1952, Samuel M. Beaubaire sold the Sentinel and radio station KNGS-LP to Earl J. Fenston, owner of KSJV. In 1958, Fenston Newspapers sold the Sentinel and Santa Maria Times to Scripps League Newspapers. In 1996, Scripps was bought by Pulitzer, Inc.

In 2005, Lee Enterprises acquired Pulitzer. In 2020, Lee sold the Sentinel and Santa Maria Times, Lompoc Record, Santa Ynez Valley News and others to Santa Maria California News Media Inc., a newly formed company led by a group of Canadian newspaper executives.
