= The Sun Chronicle =

Newspaper in Attleboro, Massachusetts

- Type: Daily newspaper
- Format: Broadsheet
- Owner: Triboro Massachusetts News Media
- Editor-in-chief: Craig Borges
- Photo editor: Paul Connors
- Founded: February 3, 1871 (154 years ago) as The Evening Chronicle; September 3, 1889 (136 years ago) as The Attleboro Sun
- Relaunched: March 1, 1971 (54 years ago) as The Sun Chronicle
- Language: English
- Headquarters: 34 South Main Street
- City: Attleboro, Massachusetts 02703
- Country: United States
- Circulation: 10,400 daily (as of August 1, 2018)
- Sister newspapers: Foxboro Reporter (est. 1884); North Chronicle; Entertainment ADvisor; Silver City Bulletin
- ISSN: 1053-7805
- OCLC number: 16645175
- Website: thesunchronicle.com

The Sun Chronicle (formerly The Attleboro Sun and the Evening Chronicle) is a daily newspaper in Attleboro, Massachusetts, United States. Most of its readers are in Attleboro and North Attleborough, Massachusetts, but it also covers nearby Foxborough, Mansfield, Norfolk, Norton, Plainville, Rehoboth, Seekonk, and Wrentham, Massachusetts, as well as North Eastern Rhode Island. Its headquarters is located at 34 South Main St. in Attleboro.

The Sun Chronicle office also publishes the weekly Foxboro Reporter, weekly North Chronicle, weekly shopper Entertainment ADvisor, and the Silver City Bulletin in Taunton, Massachusetts.

In February 2005, The Sun Chronicle began publishing in the morning after decades as an afternoon newspaper.

== Beginnings ==
The Sun Chronicle was founded in 1971 by Guy S. DeVany, who merged The Attleboro Sun (1889–1971), of which he was publisher, with The Evening Chronicle of North Attleborough (1871–1971).

The North Attleborough Evening Chronicle began February 3, 1871 as The Attleborough Chronicle, a 4-page weekly founded by Walter Phillips, a Providence newspaperman whose wife was Attleboro native Francena Capron. Phillips moved the newspaper's headquarters to North Attleboro in January 1873. Its name was changed to the North Attleborough Evening Chronicle in 1887, when the town of North Attleborough split from Attleboro.

The Attleboro Sun published its first issue September 3, 1889. For decades the two papers were friendly rivals.

The Chronicle was a small newspaper with big connections; for most of its history, its publisher was the prominent Republican Congressman Joseph W. Martin Jr., who served in the House from 1925 to 1967 and was Speaker of the U.S. House of Representatives from 1947 to 1949 and again from 1953 to 1955. Martin ran the Chronicle for six decades, and gave North Attleboro a reputation for conservatism.

The Attleboro Sun, for its part, was sold by a group of local businessmen in 1906 to John S. Vallette, an advertising salesman for The Providence Journal. He appointed a 19-year-old reporter, Charles C. Cain Jr., as the paper's editor.

Vallette expanded the newspaper's reach, and pushed for Attleboro to adopt a city form of government, which it did in 1914. Then in 1929, Cain became the newspaper's publisher, and in 1933 he appointed Clarence D. Roberts as editor. Roberts remained with the paper for about half a century, in later years contributing columns from Florida.

== Merger ==
In 1957, Charles Cain sold the Sun to a group of local businessmen. DeVany, who published newspapers in the Midwest, replaced Cain. His tenure was marked by the Sun's modernization. In 1969, it was he who engineered the sale of the paper to Howard J. Brown and United Communications. Meanwhile, Joe Martin died in 1968, and two years later his brother sold the Chronicle to United Communications, too.

The Sun and the Chronicle operated separately under the same ownership for one year until they merged in March 1971 and became The Sun Chronicle. At the time, their combined circulation was 16,000.

The 20-page first issue of The Sun Chronicle was published on March 1, 1971. An advertisement for it on the back cover of the 12-page final edition of The Attleboro Sun declared: "The new Sun Chronicle will be an adventure in print . . . stimulating . . . provocative . . . at times disturbing . . . always interesting."

DeVany and General Manager Paul A. Rixon modernized the new Sun Chronicle, expanded its facilities, and boosted its circulation. For example, The Sun Chronicle says it was the first newspaper to convert from hot-type production to offset printing.

DeVany retired in 1983, and Rixon, who had been with the paper since 1960, took over as publisher. He continued The Sun Chronicle's modernization, and also acquired The Foxboro Reporter in 1986. Rixon launched a Sunday edition of The Sun Chronicle in 1989.

Rixon retired in 1998, and was replaced as publisher by General Manager Oreste P. D'Arconte, who had joined The Attleboro Sun as a reporter in 1969. D'Arconte launched The Sun Chronicle's web site in January 1999.

As of June 2007 The Sun Chronicle's circulation was growing - though that trend reversed in the following years - while its website averaged 11,000 visitors a day in the first half of 2007. A redesigned web site was quietly launched in April 2008.

In September of 2025 The Sun Chronicle switched to mail delivery, as opposed to carrier delivery. The decision was due to lack of carriers willing to deliver in the early hours in the morning and to keep the delivery schedule routine for all physical subscribers.

United Communications Corporation, which owned The Sun Chronicle until 2018, also owns two other dailies, the Kenosha News of Wisconsin and Watertown Public Opinion of South Dakota.

== Triboro Massachusetts News Media ==
In August, 2018, the newspaper was sold by United Communications Corporation to Triboro Massachusetts News Media, a new entity led by Canadian newspaper executive Steven Malkowich.
