= Billings Gazette =

Newspaper in Billings, Montana

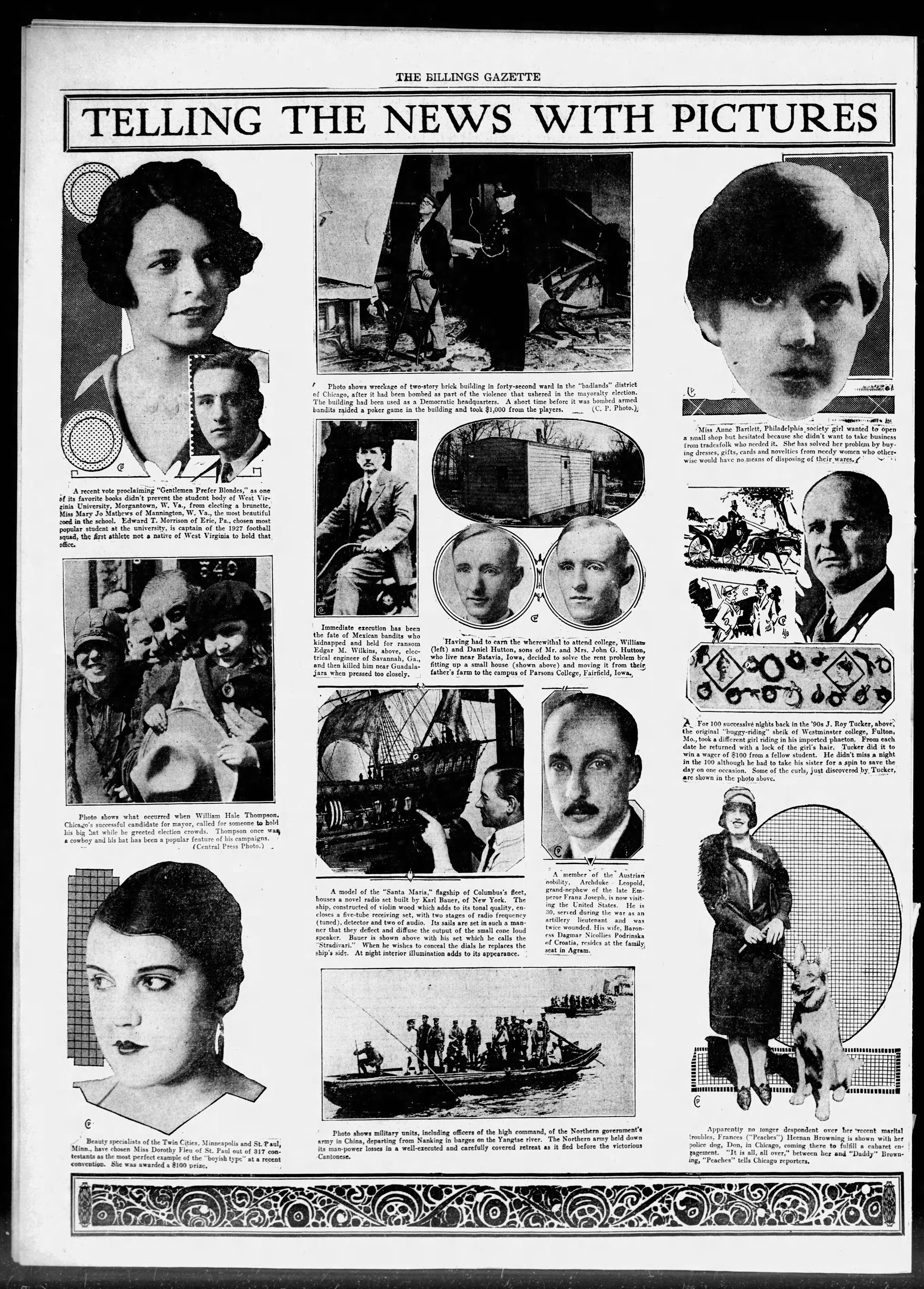
- Type: Daily newspaper
- Format: Broadsheet
- Owner: Lee Enterprises
- Publisher: Bill Merrill
- Editor: Rob Rogers
- Founded: May 2, 1885; 141 years ago (as Billings Daily Gazette)
- Language: English
- Headquarters: 401 North Broadway Avenue; Billings, Montana 59101; United States
- Circulation: 26,418 Daily; 28,541 Sunday (as of 2023)
- ISSN: 2372-868X (print); 2372-8698 (web)
- OCLC number: 10317615
- Website: billingsgazette.com

The Billings Gazette is a daily newspaper based in Billings, Montana, that primarily covers issues in southeast Montana and parts of northern Wyoming. Historically it has been known as the largest newspaper in Montana and is geographically one of the most widely distributed newspapers in the nation.

The paper frequently exchanges content with its four sister papers in the state – the Missoulian, the Helena Independent Record, The Montana Standard and the Ravalli Republic — all of which, along with the Gazette, are owned by Lee Enterprises. Lee announced a Montana State News Bureau near the end of 2020 that serves the Gazette and its sister papers.

== History ==
The first edition of the Gazette was published May 2, 1885, on a single sheet of paper. In 1959, the Anaconda Copper Mining Company sold the paper to Lee Enterprises.

In May 2020, non-managerial employees at the paper, including reporters, copy-editors and photographers, announced the formation of the Montana News Guild, and in July of that year they unanimously voted to unionize. Their first contract was ratified in November, making the Gazette the only unionized newspaper in the state of Montana.

== Headquarters ==
Billings Gazette former headquarters in 2026

The Gazette moved to a 94,000 square feet (8,700 m^{2}) facility at 401 N. Broadway in Billings on July 20, 1968. On September 15, 2021, it was announced that the Gazette's downtown headquarters would be listed for sale, as most of the building was by then vacant as a result of a rapidly shrinking staff. In 2025, the Gazette announced that its headquarters had been sold to Stockman Bank, and the newspaper would be printed in Bozeman. Though Stockman Bank opted out of the deal soon after, the Gazette moved forward with dismantling its local printing operations.

== Circulation ==
In 2013, circulation of the print edition was around 39,405 copies, and that number increased to more than 44,000 on Sundays. The Gazette's website, billingsgazette.com, receives over 10 million page views per month.

== Press ==
The press runs from around 10:30 p.m. to 3:00 a.m. daily and prints approximately 45,000 copies of the Billings Gazette; as of 2013, non‑Sunday circulation was 39,405, the highest in Montana; on Sunday, the press runs from around 9:30 p.m. to 3:30 a.m. and 44,937 copies are printed.
