= Santa Ynez Valley News =

Weekly newspaper published in Solvang, California

- Type: Weekly newspaper
- Owner: Santa Maria California News Media Inc.
- Founder: Oscar L. Powell
- Founded: 1925
- Language: English
- City: Solvang, California
- Sister newspapers: Lompoc Record; Santa Maria Times
- Website: syvnews.com

The Santa Ynez Valley News is a weekly newspaper published in Solvang, California.

== History ==
On December 11, 1925, Oscar L. Powell published the first edition of the Santa Ynez Valley News. The paper originally rolled off the presses of the Lompoc Record. Several months later Marcus Nielsen helped Powell construct a new printing plant in Solvang, California.

In November 1927, Walter L. Hanson purchased the paper for $7,000 from Powell. Powell went on to found the Elsinore Tribune which ceased in July 1930. Hanson sold the Valley News to Karl R. Jorgensen and Richard L. Kintzel in November 1945. Jorgensen bought out Kintzel in 1958.

Jorgensen transferred ownership of the Valley News to a corporation owned by a group of shareholders in April 1974. Gaylen R. Jackson was then named general manager. In April 1975, the Valley News was acquired by Sentinel Publishing Company, which was owned by Kenneth E. Johnson and his wife Peggy of Grand Junction, Colorado. The company owned several publications including The Daily Sentinel. Mrs. Johnson was an Arabian horse breeder and founded the International Arabian Horse Journal. James E. Shouse was named published. In June 1979, the Sentinel was sold to Cox Enterprises. The paper's former manager Jackson died in April 1986.

Peg Johnson operated the Valley News for decades and won an Arabian Horse World Championship title in Paris. In April 1997, she named her daughter La Cinda Johnson as Valley News publisher. She resumed the role of publisher after her daughter died unexpectedly in December 1998 after suffering an Asthma attack. In July 2004, Peg Johnson sold the Valley News to Pulitzer, Inc., which owned the Santa Maria Times and Lompoc Record.

In February 2005, Lee Enterprises acquired Pulitzer. In February 2020, Lee sold the Santa Maria Times, Hanford Sentinel, Lompoc Record, Santa Ynez Valley News and others to Santa Maria California News Media Inc., a newly formed company led by a group of Canadian newspaper executives. In January 2021, former Valley News owner Peg Johnson died.
