= United Communications =

American media company

United Communications Corp.
- Company type: Private
- Industry: Television
- Founded: 1961
- Fate: Television stations acquired by Gray Media
- Headquarters: 5800 7th Ave., Kenosha, Wisconsin 53140 USA
- Key people: Lucy Brown Minn, president
- Products: Three TV stations

United Communications Corporation (UCC) was a privately owned operator of three television stations in the U.S. states of Minnesota and New York. The company was the publisher of the Kenosha News of Kenosha, Wisconsin and two other daily newspapers.

== History ==
Founded in 1961 by the Brown family, upon its purchase of the News, the company added a Massachusetts newspaper in the 1970s, buying two competing newspapers—the Attleboro Sun and North Attleborough Chronicle—and merging them into The Sun Chronicle.

UCC then entered the television business through two sales mandated by Federal Communications Commission (FCC) competition rules. The Watertown Daily Times of Watertown, New York, sold WWNY-TV for $8.2 million in 1981; the national media chain Lee Enterprises sold KEYC-TV in Mankato, Minnesota, in 1977.

In the 21st century, UCC added its last two properties, founding WNYF-LP, a low-power television station in Watertown, New York, in 2001, and a year later buying the Watertown Public Opinion in eastern South Dakota.

Owner and President Howard J. Brown died April 29, 2011.

In March 2013, his daughter Lucy Brown Minn was named president of the company. Her mother, Elizabeth K. Brown, serves as chairwoman of the board.

== Former properties ==
=== Newspapers ===
- Kenosha News of Kenosha, Wisconsin, acquired 1961, sold 2019.
- The Sun Chronicle of Attleboro, Massachusetts, acquired 1970, sold 2018.
- Watertown Public Opinion of Watertown, South Dakota, acquired 2002, sold 2016.

=== Television ===
- KEYC-TV, a CBS (DT1) and Fox (DT2) affiliate, of Mankato, Minnesota, acquired 1977, sold in 2019.
- WWNY-TV, a CBS affiliate, of Watertown, New York, acquired 1981, sold in 2019.
- WNYF-CD, a Fox affiliate, of Watertown, New York, founded 2001, sold in 2019.
