= Rhinelander Daily News =

Newspaper published in Wisconsin, US

The Rhinelander Daily News
- Type: Daily newspaper
- Owner: Northwoods Media LLC
- Editor: R.W. Timmons
- Founded: 1882
- Headquarters: 314 Courtney Street, Rhinelander, Wisconsin 54501; United States
- Circulation: 5302
- ISSN: 0746-5866

The Rhinelander Daily News was a newspaper based in Rhinelander, Wisconsin. The newspaper was published mornings, six days per week, from Sunday to Friday. It was owned by Northwoods Media LLC. The Daily News was primarily distributed in the Oneida County area. It published a monthly business-to-business publication called Business Watch, and Best Years, a monthly publication for mature readers.

== History ==
The newspaper traced its origin to 1882. That year a newspaper called The New North began publication in Rhinelander. In 1890, an Eagle River, Wisconsin newspaper called The Vindicator was formed; it later became The Rhinelander News in 1910. During World War I, the publishers of The News decided they wanted daily coverage of the war, so they began publishing daily in 1917. The News purchased The New North in 1947.

The paper was formerly owned by Scripps League Newspapers, which was acquired by Pulitzer in 1996; Lee Enterprises acquired Pulitzer in 2005. In 2006, Lee sold the Daily News to local ownership.

On January 14, 2011, the former website of the Rhinelander was rebranded to The Northwoods River News (owned by Walker Communications, LLC), eventually redirecting to the current URL in 2013.
