= Santa Maria Times =

Daily newspaper published in Santa Maria, California

- Type: Daily newspaper (Tuesday-Sunday)
- Format: Broadsheet
- Owner: Santa Maria California News Media Inc.
- Founder(s): H.J. Laughlin; S. Clevenger
- Publisher: Terri Leifeste
- Editor: Marga K. Cooley
- Founded: April 1882
- Language: English
- Circulation: 21,579 (as of 2018)
- Sister newspapers: Lompoc Record; Santa Ynez Valley News
- ISSN: 0745-6166
- Website: santamariatimes.com

The Santa Maria Times is a daily American newspaper on California's Central Coast serving the cities of Santa Maria; Orcutt; Guadalupe; Nipomo; unincorporated parts of northern Santa Barbara County and southern San Luis Obispo County. It is published Tuesday through Saturday, and is part of Santa Maria California News Media Inc., which also publishes the Lompoc Record and Santa Ynez Valley News, among other newspapers.

== History ==
The Santa Maria Times was first published on April 22, 1882. The proprietor was H.J. Laughlin and S. Clevenger was the editor and manager. Laughlin retired as part owner in March 1884 and was succeeded by Clevenger and George W. Jenkins. Ownership changed again in May 1887 to Jenkins and McGuire.

A year later the Times expanded from a weekly to a twice-weekly. In January 1894, O.W. Maulsby became editor while Jenkins continued to manage the business. James F. Lyon leased the interest of McGuire in March 1896. At that time the circulation was 1,200.

C.A. Seay assumed full control of the Times in 1897 and was succeeded in 1902 by Julius Ebel. In 1918, the Times became a daily. The paper was bought by Orla M. Cannon in 1920, Ernest L. Petersen, former owner of The Dickinson Press, in 1930, Robert K. and Stanworth C. Hancock in 1938, and the Kansas-based Stauffer Communications in 1948.

In 1956, Earl J. Fenston bought the Times from Stauffer. In 1958, Fenston Newspapers sold the Times and Hanford Sentinel to Scripps League Newspapers. In 1996, Scrips was bought by Pulitzer, Inc.

In 2005, Lee Enterprises acquired Pulitzer. In 2020, Lee sold the Santa Maria Times, Hanford Sentinel, Lompoc Record, Santa Ynez Valley News and others to Santa Maria California News Media Inc., a newly formed company led by a group of Canadian newspaper executives.
