= Great Falls Tribune =

Newspaper in Great Falls, Montana

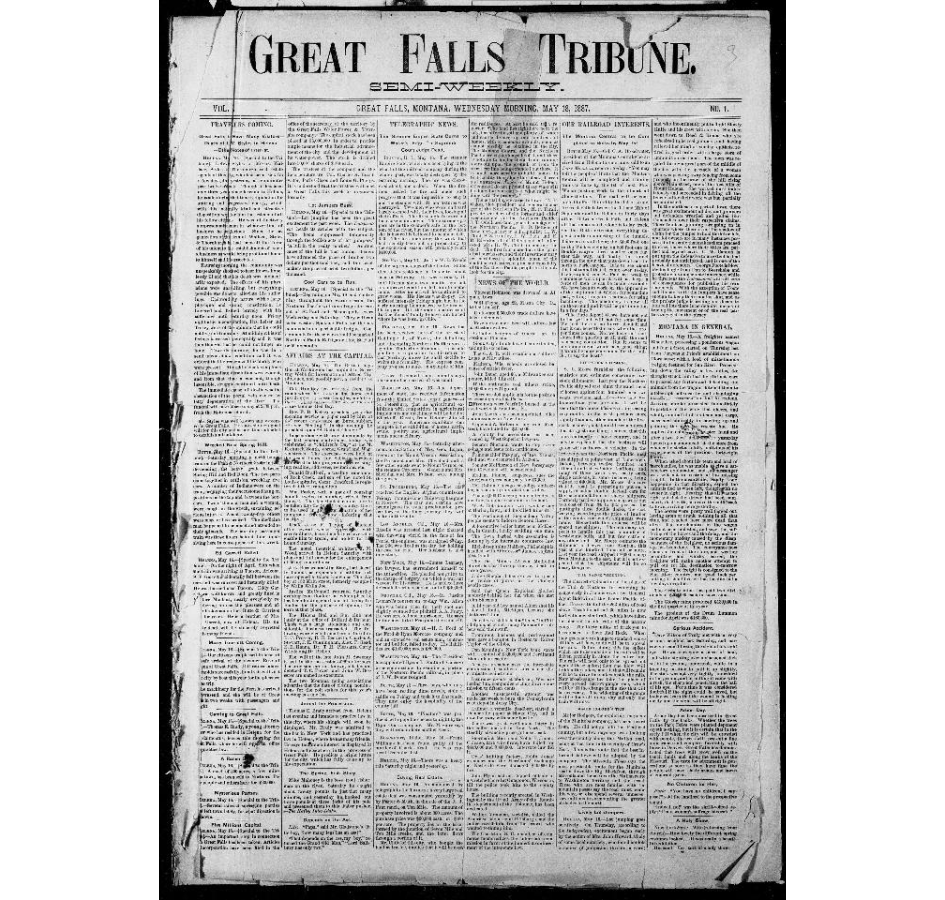
- May 18, 1887, issue of the Great Falls Tribune
- Type: Daily newspaper
- Format: Broadsheet
- Owner: Lee Enterprises
- Founder: Will Hanks
- Founded: 1884
- Language: English
- Headquarters: 701 River Drive South #1; Great Falls, Montana, United States
- City: Helena, Montana (publishing)
- Website: greatfallstribune.com

The Great Falls Tribune is a daily morning newspaper covering Great Falls, Montana. It is one of Montana's largest newspaper companies and printed in Helena, Montana.

== History ==
Will Hanks moved from Ohio to Montana to establish the Sun River Sun in Sun River, Montana. It was first published on February 14, 1884. A year later Hanks moved his printing plant to Great Falls, Montana. The first edition of the Weekly Tribune was printed on May 14, 1885. Hanks sold the Tribune in July 1887 to Jerry Collins.

In 1890, David Marks and M.J. Hutchins, of the Helena Independent, purchased the Tribune. J.A. McKnight was installed as editor in 1892. A year later the paper was sold to its employees and McKnight was replaced by R.E. Gray. The paper's mortgage was soon foreclosed and the business was sold at auction for $5,000 to A.M. Scott of First National bank in July 1894. Phil A. Julien was then installed as editor.

William McClure Bole purchased the paper in December 1894, and operated it with Oliver Sherman Warden until selling it to William A. Clark in 1900. McClure then operated the Bozeman Daily Chronicle. Clark sold the paper to W.G. Conrad in October 1904. McClure and Warden reacquired the Tribune in April 1905.

McClure died in 1932. Warden died in 1951, then succeeded at the Tribune by his son Alexander Warden. Decades later O.C. Warden was inducted into the Montana Newspaper Hall of Fame in 1958, followed by W.M. Bole in 1963. The Warden family sold the paper in 1965 to Tribune Co., owners of the Minneapolis Star-Tribune. Decades later the Cowles Media Company sold the Tribune to Gannett in 1990.

The Tribune launched a subsidiary company, River's Edge Printing in 2006; the latter printed for weekly newspapers on a Goss Community press. In July 2020, printing of the Great Falls Tribune moved to the presses of the Independent Record in Helena. In November 2026, Gannett was renamed to USA Today Co. In September 2026, the Tribune was acquired by Lee Enterprises.

== Awards ==
The Great Falls Tribune won the Pulitzer Prize for Explanatory Reporting in 2000 for a yearlong series on alcoholism.
