= Martinsville Speedway =

Motorsport track in the United States

The Paperclip
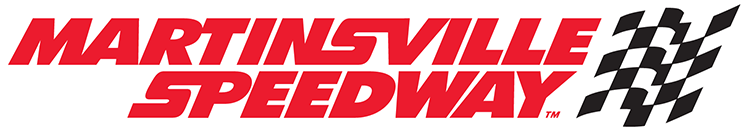

- Location: 4201 Greensboro Road; Ridgeway, Virginia; 24148
- Coordinates: 36°38′02″N 79°51′04″W
- Capacity: Exact figure unknown; less than 44,000
- Owner: NASCAR (2019–present); International Speedway Corporation (2004–2019); Henry Clay Earles (1947–1999)
- Operator: Clay Campbell
- Opened: September 1947; 79 years ago
- Construction cost: $60,000 USD
- Major events: Current: NASCAR Cup Series; Cook Out 400 (1950–present); Xfinity 500 (1949–present); NASCAR O'Reilly Auto Parts Series; NFPA 250 (1982–1994, 2006, 2021–present); National Debt Relief 250 (1960–1994, 2020–present); Goody's 250 (2006); Zerex 150 (1982–1983, 1986–1990); NASCAR Truck Series; Black's Tire 200 (2003–2021, 2024–present); Boys & Girls Club of the Blue Ridge 200 (1995–2019, 2022–2025); ValleyStar Credit Union 300 (1985–2019, 2021–present)
- Website: martinsvillespeedway.com

Oval (1947–present)
- Surface: Asphalt (straights and higher lanes of turns); Concrete (lower lanes of turns)
- Length: 0.526 mi (0.847 km)
- Turns: 4
- Banking: Turns: 12° Straights: 0°
- Race lap record: 0:18.845 ( (United States) Ross Chastain, Chevrolet Camaro ZL1, 2022, NASCAR Cup)

Martinsville Speedway is a 0.526 mi (0.847 km) oval short track in Ridgeway, Virginia, United States, a community of Martinsville, Virginia. The track has held a variety of events since its opening in 1947, primarily events sanctioned by NASCAR. Martinsville Speedway is owned by NASCAR and led by track president Clay Campbell.

Originally a dirt oval, Martinsville Speedway opened in September 1947 under the ownership of Virginia businessman Henry Clay Earles. The facility quickly formed a relationship with NASCAR, with it hosting its first Cup Series races in 1949 and half interest of the track being purchased by the France family the year after. In 1955, the track was paved with asphalt. After 21 years of constant repaving, the lower lanes of the track's corners were paved with concrete. Martinsville Speedway underwent major expansion starting in the 1990s, adding seating capacity and renovating other amenities. In 2004, the track was bought out by the International Speedway Corporation (ISC) from the Earles and France families. 15 years later, the track was bought by NASCAR after the sanctioning body purchased ISC.

== Description ==
=== Configuration ===
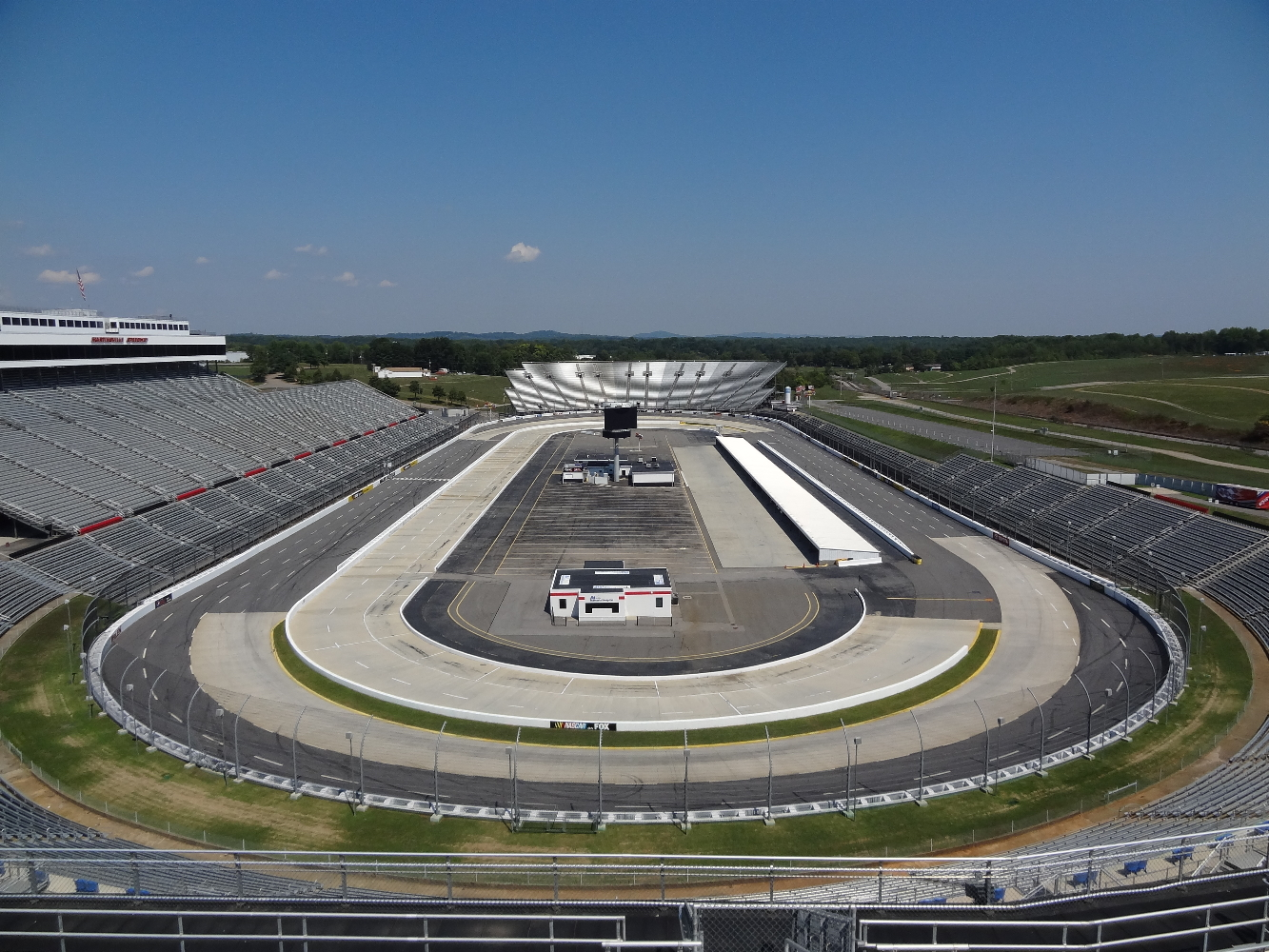
An overhead photo of Martinsville Speedway in 2011.

Martinsville Speedway in its current configuration is measured at 0.526 mi (0.847 km), with 12° of banking in each of the track's four turns and no banking on the track's straights. The track is currently paved with both asphalt and concrete. The former is used for the straights and upper lanes of the corners while the latter is used for the lower lanes of the corners.

=== Amenities ===
Martinsville Speedway is located in Ridgeway, Virginia, and is served by U.S. Route 58 and U.S. Route 220. As of 2019, the track has a capacity of 44,000 according to ESPN; however, this number is disputed due to the additional removal of seats in 2022.

==== Hot dogs ====
Martinsville Speedway is known for selling $2 "Martinsville hot dogs" at its concession stands. The hot dogs are often sold with mustard, chili, cole slaw, and onions as toppings. The speedway started selling hot dogs sometime during the track's infancy and became a staple of the track over the course of decades. As of 2023, the hot dogs are supplied by Jesse Jones, which has been the same supplier since the track started selling hot dogs with the exception of a brief period between 2015 to 2018 when they were supplied by Valleydale Foods.

== Track history ==
=== Early dirt years ===
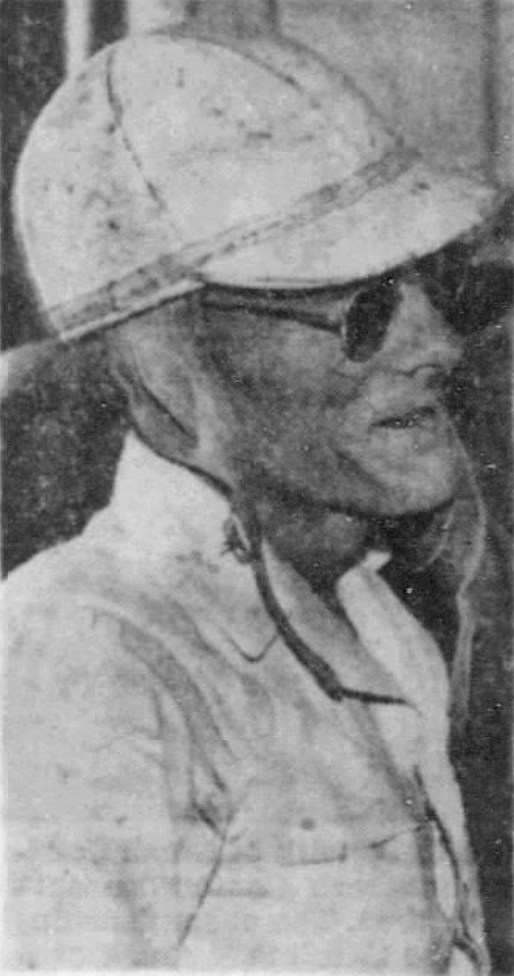
Early stock car racing driver Red Byron (pictured in 1949) won the first race at the Martinsville Speedway in 1947. He later went on to win the track's first NASCAR Cup Series race at the venue two years later.

After attending local stock car races in the Salisbury, North Carolina, area, businessman Henry Clay Earles partnered with Sam Rice and Henry Lawrence to build a racing facility, eventually finding a 30-acre (12-hectare) plot of land in Ridgeway, Virginia. The three agreed to invest $10,000 for a total of $30,000 (adjusted for inflation, $432,563), with original plans including seating capacity for 5,000; however, after building the red clay track and a surrounding guard rail, the project had gone twice over the original budget. Despite the lack of capacity, Earles and Rice agreed to stage the track's first race on September 7, 1947, featuring a modified program. The race ran as scheduled, with Red Byron winning the event in front of a paying crowd of 6,013. The race itself was marred by heavy dust and an influx of non-paying spectators; Earles later stated in a 1967 interview that "it turned out to be the dustiest place I've ever seen. Had an H-bomb dropped there, it wouldn't have been any dustier. After the race, you couldn't recognize the people leaving. They looked like 6,013 Indians."

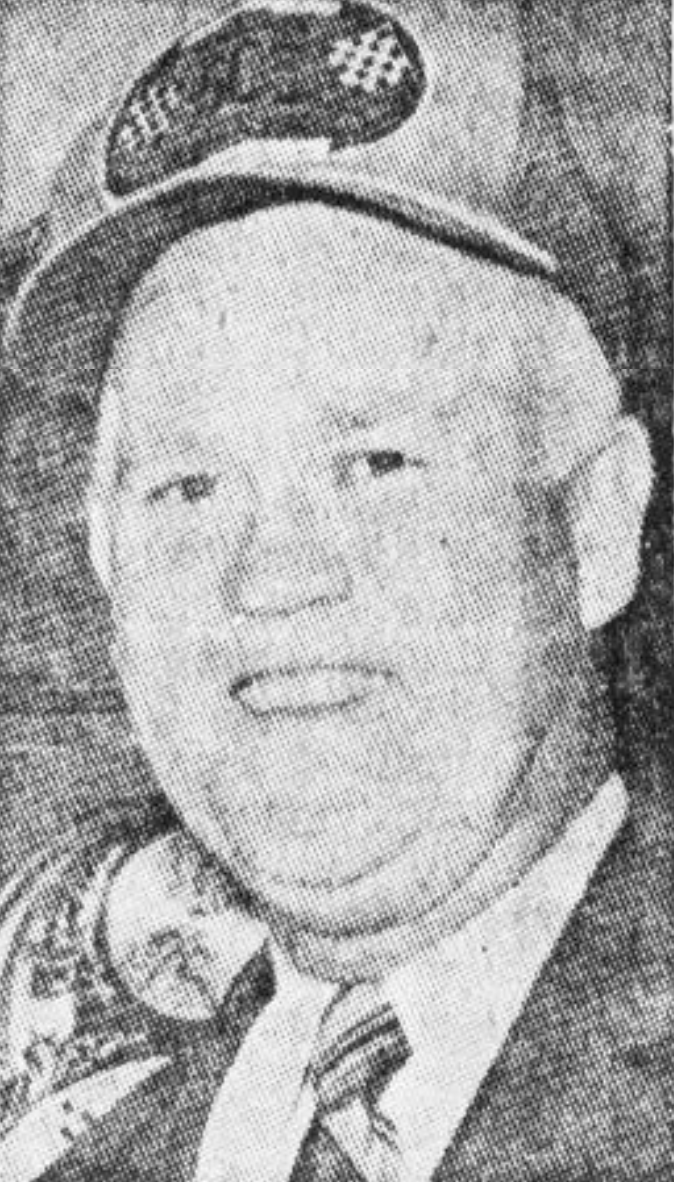
Henry Clay Earles (pictured in 1973) ran Martinsville Speedway from 1947 until 1999.

Following the track's first race, a series of renovations were completed on the venue in 1948. A new surrounding fence was constructed in March to keep out non-paying spectators. The following month, a 43-acre (17-hectare) farm was bought out by the speedway to expand parking space for the venue. By the track's first race of the 1948 season in July, a new concrete grandstand with a seating capacity of approximately 4,000 was completed. The following year, Martinsville Speedway ran its first NASCAR Strictly Stock Series (now known as the NASCAR Cup Series) race on September 26, with Red Byron winning the event. In 1950, NASCAR founder Bill France Sr. bought out Rice and Lawrence's shares in the track, having previously agreed to a business partnership with Earles in July 1947.

=== Paving, expansion ===
In the following three decades, Martinsville Speedway went through consistent expansion. In 1953, the first talks about a potential paving of the track were mentioned by Earles in the Martinsville Bulletin. After stating that the option of paving was being given "serious consideration" a year later, in June 1955, Earles officially announced the paving of the track alongside the additions of a concrete retaining wall and the expansion of seating capacity. Work on the project began in July and was completed in September; with the expansion, seating capacity in the grandstand was increased to 8,670 according to a 1956 advertisement. The construction of a new grandstand containing 7,000 seats named the East Grandstand was announced and completed the following year, expanding capacity to approximately 16,000.

In 1960, a scaffold was erected over the West Grandstand to cover part of the grandstand. Two years later, a new air-conditioned press box was constructed over the track's fourth turn. In 1963, the track was slightly altered, with the track surface in the turns being widened by 2 in (5.1 cm). Further additions to seating capacity were in the following two years, setting capacity to 21,000 in 1965. In 1969, the track length was changed from 0.5 mi (0.80 km) to 0.526 mi (0.847 km) after NASCAR implemented a new track length measurement system. The following year, three groups sought to buy the track and transform the track complex to include a 2 mi (3.2 km) speedway, with Earles setting a price of $1,000,000 (adjusted for inflation, $8,290,488) in July. However, within the month, all offers for the track failed to materialize. In 1972, a $25,000 beautification project was completed, which included the repaving of the track's turns. Another $100,000 project was started the following year, which repaved the entire track and increased seating capacity to "just over 30,000" by 1974 with the construction of seats in the first and second turns.

=== Era of mass expansion ===
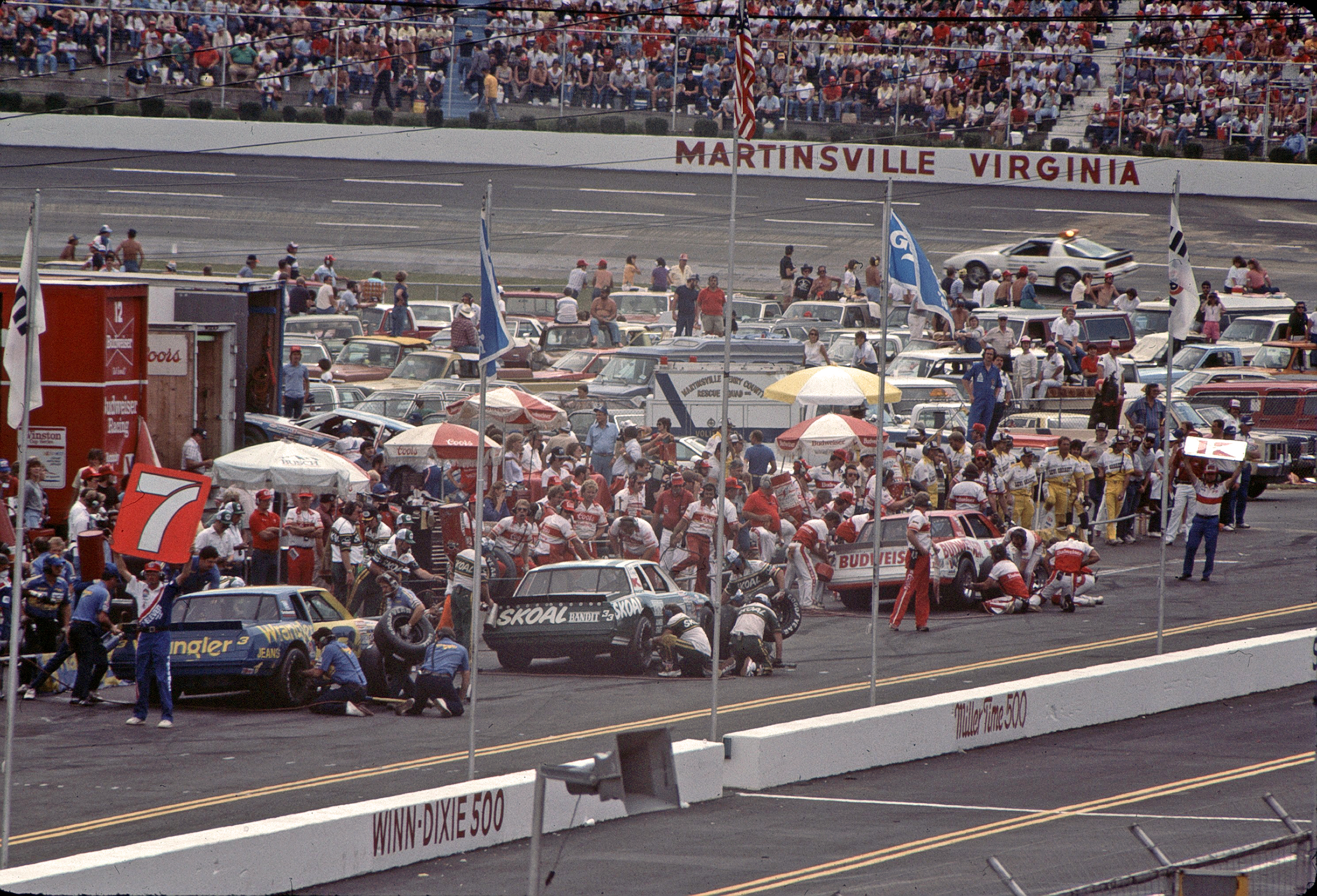
Martinsville Speedway in 1985.

The track was again repaved in 1976; however, the lower lanes were repaved with concrete instead of the usual asphalt, with Earles deciding on concrete because he thought it would last longer than an asphalt surface. In 1979, a new $100,000, 105-seat press box over the track's first and second turns was completed. On October 24, 1985, the first fatality in the track's history occurred when modified driver Richie Evans crashed in the track's third and fourth turns, dying from multiple trauma. In 1987, a 2,000-seat tower over the first turn was completed, increasing seating capacity to 32,000. On March 22 of the same year, the track also experienced its second fatality after modified driver Charlie Jarzombek sustained a stuck throttle and crashed into the first and second turns.

Heading into the 1990s, expansive and frequent changes to both seating capacity and other amenities were made. (Note: The extent of how many seats were added during expansion is disputed; in a 2004 report, it was found that the actual capacity was 63,000 for that year. Prior to 2004, the seating capacity number listed was inconsistent, with different sources listing disputing numbers.) In 1989, numerous additions were made toward the track, including new retaining catchfences and a new 2,500-seat tower, in the process removing the roof from the West Grandstand. Additional seating was constructed over each of the following five years, with additions of 2,500, 3,000, 5,000, 1,200, and 3,000 seats being built each year, respectively. In 1996, a new 7,000-seat tower named after Bill France Sr. was constructed over the third and fourth turns. The following year, the Bill France Tower was expanded by 5,000 seats. In addition, pit road was expanded by six pit stalls. Another tower was built on the frontstretch in 1998, with 8,000 seats being added. In April 1999, the backstretch pit road was removed from the track layout, with all pit stalls being condensed onto one singular pit road.

On November 16, 1999, Earles died from illness, with his grandson Clay Campbell taking over control of the facility. In 2000, a 5,000-seat grandstand on the first and second turns, eight suites, a new press box, were constructed. Multiple renovations were made in 2001, including the construction of a new infield garage building for Cup Series teams, the resurfacing of the concrete sections of the track surface, and a widened pit road. The concrete portions of the track surface were resurfaced in 2002, initially causing concerns of higher than usual tire falloff before being dispelled after the running of the 2002 Old Dominion 500. A $2.5 million renovation project aimed at adding 2,000 seats and the moving of a nearby Norfolk Southern railroad for additional seating was announced in 2003, with a scheduled completion date of October of that year. However, the plan was delayed, with work on the railroad not starting until 2004 and not completed until 2005. In 2004, both the concrete and asphalt portions of the track surface were repaved after parts of the concrete were dislodged in the 2004 Advance Auto Parts 500. SAFER barriers were also added in 2004 around the outside perimeter of the track.

=== ISC purchase ===
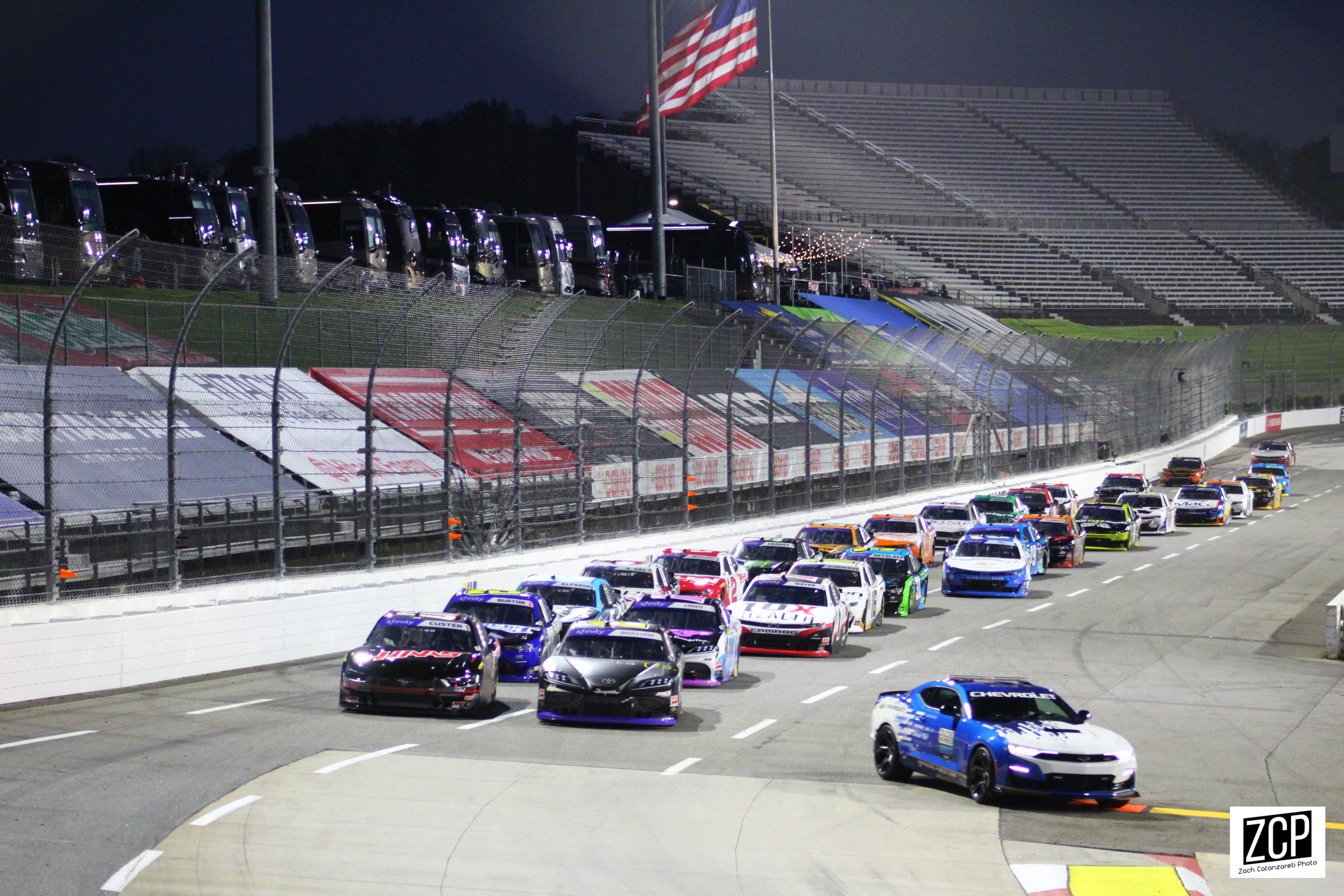
Night racing at the speedway in 2024. In 2017, a permanent lighting system was installed at the track to host night racing.

In February 2004, the Bulletin reported that an unspecified buyer was seeking to purchase Martinsville Speedway. Although Campbell denied interest of selling the facility the following month in The Roanoke Times, on May 14, the France family-owned International Speedway Corporation (ISC) announced their purchase of Martinsville Speedway for $192 million (adjusted for inflation, $316,510,479). In 2005, Martinsville Speedway ran its first night race, using temporary lights to host a modified race. Three years later, a new scoreboard, media center, and additional SAFER barriers were constructed at a cost of around $2 million. Another $3 million was spent in 2011 on a new speaker system and the widening of grandstand seats. In 2013, Martinsville Speedway decreased its capacity by 8,000, resetting its seating capacity to 55,000. A permanent lighting system for hosting night races was constructed in 2017, with the system costing approximately $5 million to install. Two years later, seating capacity decreased further to 44,000 according to ISC archive records. In the same year, control of the facility was bought out by NASCAR after the sanctioning body purchased ISC. In 2022, additional seats were removed in the first and second turns and were replaced by grass.

== Events and other uses ==
=== NASCAR ===
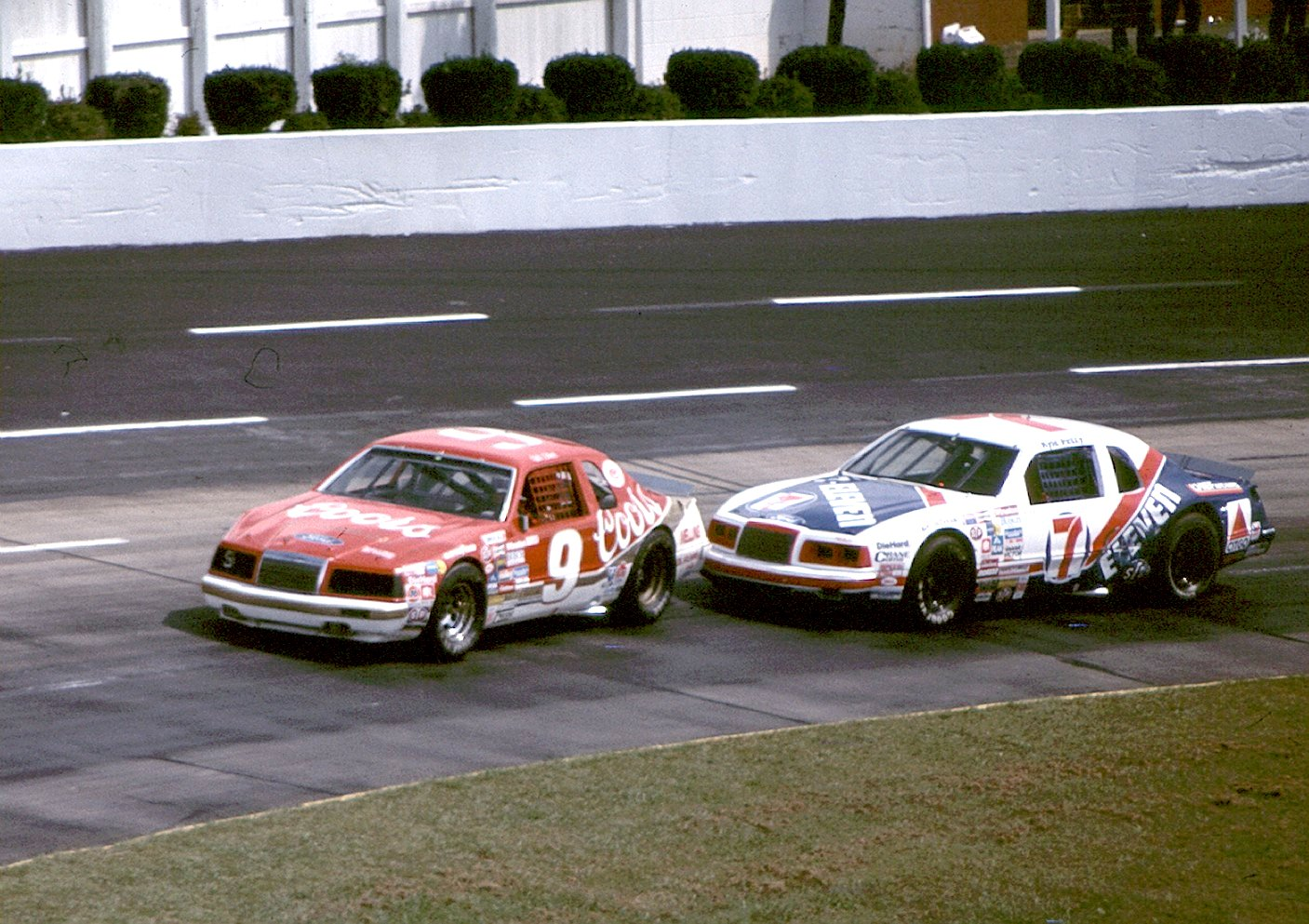
A NASCAR Cup Series race at Martinsville Speedway in 1985. Since 1949, the track has held the series annually.

The track hosts two annual NASCAR weekends, highlighted by NASCAR Cup Series races known as the Cook Out 400 and the Xfinity 500. It also hosts support races from the NASCAR O'Reilly Auto Parts Series with the NFPA 250 and the National Debt Relief 250, and the NASCAR Truck Series with the Black's Tire 200.

=== Filming production ===
The track was used as a filming location for The Last American Hero, a 1973 film inspired by NASCAR driver and team owner Junior Johnson.

== Race lap records ==
As of October 2024, the fastest official race lap records at Martinsville Speedway are listed as:

Category	Time	Driver	Vehicle	Event
Oval (1947–present): 0.526 mi (0.847 km)
NASCAR Cup	0:18.845	Ross Chastain	Chevrolet Camaro ZL1	2022 Xfinity 500
NASCAR Truck	0:19.911	Layne Riggs	Ford F-150	2024 Long John Silver's 200
NASCAR Xfinity	0:20.216	Daniel Hemric	Toyota GR Supra NASCAR	2021 Dead On Tools 250
Mazda MX-5 Cup	0:22.778	Jared Thomas	Mazda MX-5 (ND)	2024 Martinsville Mazda MX-5 Cup round
