= Homer Maxwell Keever =

Historian of Iredell County, North Carolina, US (1905–1979)

Homer M. Keever
- Born: February 16, 1905; Shelby, North Carolina, US
- Died: September 12, 1979 (aged 74); Charlotte, North Carolina, US
- Resting place: Oakwood Cemetery, Statesville, North Carolina
- Occupations: local historian, high school teacher, Methodist deacon
- Known for: history of Iredell County
- Children: 2

Homer Maxwell Keever (February 16, 1905 – September 12, 1979) was a local historian, journalist, Methodist deacon, high school teacher, and author of hundreds of local histories published in Statesville, North Carolina, about the history and folklore of Iredell County, North Carolina, including the book Iredell, Piedmont County, published for the United States Bicentennial.

== Early life ==
Homer was born in a cotton mill house in Shelby, Cleveland County, North Carolina. He was the son of Reverend John Calvin Keever and Annie Blanch (Monroe) Keever. His parents were married in late May 1904, less than a year before Homer was born. The Mill house served as the parsonage for the Albemarle Circuit of the Methodist Episcopal Church-South, for which Reverend J. C. Keever was minister. Homer married Alta Myrtle Allen. His mother was a school teacher. Homer's historical philosophy was heavily influenced by being raised by a minister and school teacher.

== Education ==
He graduated at age 14 in 1919 from a ten-grade school in Troutman. After graduation, he entered Trinity College in Durham, a Methodist institution and now part of Duke University. He received an Artium Baccalaureatus degree from Trinity in 1923 with an emphasis in the religious training curricula. After graduation, he taught for a year at Piedmont high school in Cleveland County, North Carolina. Then, he took a job with the Western North Carolina Conference of the Methodist Church for three years. He returned to Trinity College (re-named Duke University) in 1927. He earned an Artium Magister degree in 1930 and Bachelor of Divinity in 1931 in New Testament. He was unemployed for two years before obtaining a preaching job in Charolotte where he remained until 1933 when he found a job as a sixth grade teacher in Stony Point, North Carolina.

== Career ==
He was a school teacher in Iredell County from 1934 to 1968. He was a general purpose teacher but taught mainly biology and North Carolina history in grades six, seven and eight. Homer began his research of Iredell County in 1937.

In 1949, Homer began publishing articles about Iredell County history in the Statesville newspaper, the Landmark and Statesville Daily Record, which became the Statesville Record & Landmark in 1951. In 1955, he took a part-time job as managing editor of the paper and began writing a bi-weekly column, Out of Our Past. He continued to write this column until he became ill in 1978 and wrote over 600 articles for the newspaper. He won second place in the Smithwick Cup for articles by local historians given by the Association for Local and County Historians.

== Works by Homer ==
Iredell, Piedmont County was written by Homer M. Keever in preparation for the American Bicentennial in 1976. It was a result of forty years of research by Homer, who was a local North Carolina History teacher at Stony Point and Union Grove schools in Iredell County. His work was the first comprehensive history written specifically about Iredell County. Some works written about Rowan County included discussions of people that later lived in what is now Iredell County. Homer relied extensively on his interpretation of census records, military records, church records, articles he had written in the Statesville Record & Landmark, and oral histories to compile this book. For a more recent, critical analysis of this work, see Jamie Hager's Thesis. While Homer's book relies on facts in his sources, his historical perspective is heavily influenced by his religious background and optimistic interpretation of events in the history of the county.

Biographies written by Keever for the Dictionary of North Carolina Biography include:

- Joseph Franklin Armfield (General in the North Carolina Guard who served in the Spanish–American War)
- Robert Franklin Armfield (North Carolina politician)
- Lemuel Bingham (Editor of the Western Carolinian newspaper in Salisbury in the 1800s)
- Joseph Pearson Caldwell (North Carolina politician)
- William Henry Cowles (North Carolina politician)
- Leonidas Wakefield Crawford (Methodist minister and professor of theology at Trinity College in the 1800s)
- Charles Force Deems (Methodist-Episcopal minister and college professor)
- Paul Henkel (18th Century itinerant evangelist)
- Thomas Neal Ivey (Methodist minister, editor, and educator)
- John Harvey McElwee (industrialist and father of the tobacco industry in Statesville)
- John James Mott (18th century politician, physician and hydroelectric pioneer)
- David Matthew Thompson (head of the Statesville school system in the 1800s)

Homer wrote hundreds of articles in the Statesville Record & Landmark. The Iredell County public library in Statesville has an entire collection of Homer Keever's clippings about Iredell County and the people that lived there. The following are some interesting articles that appeared in the Statesville Record & Landmark:

- Dulla Ballad Wowed Iredell Long Time Ago, May 25, 1959
- Bostian Train Wreck in 1891 is Considered Controversial, August 25, 1966
- Statesville Once Known for Wholesale Liquor, April 8, 1974

== Death ==
Homer did not live long after the Bicentennial. He was living in a nursing home in Charlotte, North Carolina when he died on September 12, 1979. He was buried in the Oakwood Cemetery in Statesville. The tremendous influence that Homer had on the Iredell County population of Iredell County was apparent from the crowd of hundreds that attended the funeral of this local high school history teacher that had written the first history of the county.
