= Ravalli Republic =

Newspaper in Hamilton, Montana

- Type: Daily newspaper
- Owner: Lee Enterprises
- Founder: James E. Stevens
- Managing editor: Jessica Abell
- Founded: 1894; 131 years ago
- Language: English
- Headquarters: 232 W Main St Hamilton, Montana 59840
- Country: United States
- Circulation: 707 (in 2023)
- OCLC number: 14222444
- Website: ravallirepublic.com

Ravalli Republic is a daily newspaper published in Hamilton, Montana. It is owned by Lee Enterprises and serves Ravalli County.

== History ==
On August 22, 1894, James E. Stevens published the first edition of The Ravalli Republican. In 1899, Stevens purchased the Bitter Root Times from L.J. Knapp and absorbed it into his paper. In 1902, the Ravaili County Democrat went out of business and its owner, E.A. Sherman, joined Stevens as partner at the Republican. In 1903, Stevens sold his shares in the Hamilton Publishing Company to Sherman.

In 1904, J.C. Conkey, who previously worked at the Stevensville Register, leased the Ravalli Republican from Sherman. He eventually acquired ownership and died in 1932, and his widow then leased the paper to J.B. Ellis. She sold the paper in 1940 to Jack E. Coulter. Two years later he expanded publication frequency from weekly to daily. In 1958, Coulter acquired the Northwest Tribune of Stevensville.

In 1963, Coulter sold the two papers to George A. Danker, who ran an advertising agency in Denver. In 1974, the Republican was renamed to the Republic. In 1975, Edward Scripps acquired the Republic and Tribune from Danker. The papers were operated by Southwest Montana Publishing Co., an affiliate of Scripps League Newspapers. In 1976, Scripps acquired The Western News of Stevensville. A year later the News was merged into the Republic. In 1996, Scripps was bought by Pulitzer, Inc. In 2005, Lee Enterprises acquired Pulitzer.
