= Lompoc Record =

Weekly newspaper published in Lompoc, California

- Type: Weekly newspaper
- Format: Broadsheet
- Owner: Santa Maria California News Media Inc.
- Founder: William W. Broughton
- Publisher: Terri Leifeste
- Editor: Marga K. Cooley
- Founded: April 1875
- Language: English
- Sister newspapers: Santa Maria Times; Santa Ynez Valley News
- OCLC number: 11528217
- Website: lompocrecord.com

The Lompoc Record is a newspaper in the town of Lompoc, California.

== History ==
The Lompoc Record was first published on April 10, 1875. It was founded by William Wallace Broughton. He published the paper for 25 years. In 1911, the Bank of Lompoc foreclosed on the Record and sold the printing plant at auction to Rae Soares. The previous owner was E.H. King.

In 1914, Ronald M. Adam bought the paper. He was the first newsman on scene of the Honda Point disaster in 1923. He witnessed and documented the rescue operation, then scooped competitors by 14 hours. His son Ken Adam started work at the Record in 1946 after serving in the U.S. navy during World War II followed by working as a script writer at MGM in Hollywood. He became publisher after his father retired in 1952 and came to be known for writing a witty column called "Something About Nothing." He also wrote and locally produced a musical called "Julie". Ken Adam died in 1966.

His widow Harriet Adam acquired the paper and managed it until selling out in 1979 to Donrey Media. At that time the circulation was 9,000. In 1999, the Record became part of the MediaNews Group-led California Media Partnership. In 2001, Pulitzer bought the paper. Lee Enterprises bought Pulitzer in 2005 and sold the newspaper to Santa Maria News Media Inc. in March 2020.
