= BLOX Digital =

Digital media and online publishing company

- Type: Private
- Industry: Online publishing
- Predecessor: International Newspaper Network
- Founded: 1989; 37 years ago in Bigfork, Montana, U.S.
- Founders: Marc Wilson; Virginia R. Wilson; Robert P. Dalton
- Headquarters: East Moline, Illinois, U.S.
- Key people: Marc Wilson (chairman); Brad Ward (CEO)
- Products: BLOX NXT Content Management System
- Website: www.bloxdigital.com

BLOX Digital (formerly TownNews.com) is a digital media and online publishing company based in East Moline, Illinois. The company's products include the BLOX NXT Content Management System, which is commonly used by American newspaper websites. In February 2023, TownNews rebranded as BLOX Digital. As of 2025, Lee Enterprises has a "82.5% interest in INN Partners, L.C. ('BLOX Digital' formerly 'TownNews')", and labels it as its "Software as a Service ('SaaS') division".

== History ==
The company was founded by Marc Wilson, Virginia R. Wilson, and Robert P. Dalton as the International Newspaper Network (INN) in 1989 to help newspapers deal with developing technology. As of 2025, over 2,000 newspapers, magazines, radio stations, and TV stations use BLOX Digital's products.

== Products ==
The company's lead product is the BLOX NXT content management system (CMS), launched in April 2025. As the company's flagship platform, it replaces the original BLOX Content Management System and is designed to meet the needs of media organizations, newspaper publishers, broadcasters of television and radio, and other content-driven businesses. BLOX NXT integrates tools for content creation, audience engagement, data analytics, and digital advertising into a unified system.

The BLOX NXT platform features AI-powered content creation assistance, providing real-time feedback on SEO, headline optimization, and content scoring, as well as audience engagement tools to enhance user targeting and retention.

== Acquisitions ==
Over the years, BLOX Digital has acquired various organizations, most notably Field59, ZWire, AdQuest, Anytime News, and DotConnect Media (formerly AdOne and PowerOne Media).

== See also ==
- Cxense
