= Statesville Record & Landmark =

Newspaper in North Carolina, United States

- Type: Daily newspaper
- Format: Broadsheet
- Owner: Lee Enterprises
- Founder: John B. Hussey
- Publisher: Eric Millsaps
- Editor: Dave Ibach
- Associate editor: Jonathan Weaver
- Founded: 1874
- Language: American English
- Headquarters: 222 E. Broad St. Statesville, North Carolina United States
- Country: United States
- Circulation: 3,999 Daily (as of 2023)
- Sister newspapers: Mooresville Tribune, Hickory Daily Record, Concord/Kannapolis Independent Tribune
- ISSN: 0745-7804
- OCLC number: 9448940
- Website: statesville.com

Logo in 2003

Statesville Record & Landmark is an American, English language daily newspaper based in Statesville, North Carolina. The newspaper is owned by Lee Enterprises. The Statesville Record & Landmark is the newspaper of record for Statesville and has been serving the city and Iredell County, North Carolina since June 19, 1874 when it was a weekly called the Landmark. It has been published seven days a week since 1920.

The Statesville Record & Landmark is a member of the North Carolina Press Association.

== History ==
The first editor and publisher was John B. Hussey. Hussey sold the paper to J.Sherman Ramsey in 1877 but remained the editor. In 1880 Ramsey sold the paper to Joseph Pearson Caldwell, Jr., son of Joseph Pearson Caldwell, Sr. Under Caldwell's leadership, the newspaper maintained a progressive editorial policy coupled with a fiscally conservative Democratic stance. In 1892, Caldwell sold half interest in the newspaper to Rufus Reid Clark, who had been on the staff of the newspaper and was a Mooresville native. The newspaper began twice weekly publication in 1895—Mondays and Thursdays. In 1905, Clark bought out Caldwell's share of the paper. In 1918, Pegram A. Bryant bought the newspaper. On September 1, 1920, Bryant began an additional publication, a daily version of the newspaper called the Statesville Daily.

A competitor newspaper, The Statesville Record, began semiweekly publication in 1931. This newspaper had several owners until 1938 when Chester E. Middlesworth bought the paper and turned it into a daily publication in 1941. In 1948, this newspaper became the first North Carolina newspaper to utilize the new Fairchild scanning engraving system, which allowed the paper to be readied for publication within minutes rather than hours.

In 1953, the Landmark and the Statesville Daily were purchased by the Statesville Daily Record and merged into one daily afternoon publication, the Statesville Record and Landmark. Park Communications bought the Statesville Record and Landmark in September 1979. Media General acquired Park Communications in 1997. In 2012, Media General sold the newspaper to Berkshire Hathaway.

Starting June 6, 2023, the print edition of the newspaper will be reduced to three days a week: Tuesday, Thursday and Saturday. Also, the newspaper will transition from being delivered by a traditional newspaper delivery carrier to mail delivery by the U.S. Postal Service.

== Content ==
The current Statesville Record and Landmark includes the following sections in their online newspaper: News, Sports, Opinion, Community, Obituaries, Photos, Videos, Weather and Jobs. A subscription service offers access to articles back to 1874. The paper also has an RSS feed, as well as Facebook, and Twitter version.

Among other columns, a local Iredell County historian Homer Maxwell Keever began writing a local history column in the newspaper in the 1940s.

== Digital presence ==
- Statesville R&L, Facebook partner
- Statesville R&L, Twitter partner

== Notable staff ==
- Daisy Hendley Gold, author and journalist
- James Robert McNally, journalist, author, poet

== See also ==
- List of newspapers in North Carolina

== Additional Sources ==
- Keever, Homer; 100th Anniversary-The Landmark (1974).
- "Statesville - The Landmark." The E.S.C. Quarterly 9. No. 1-2. Winter-Spring 1951. p. 32. "The Landmark".
