= Culpeper Star-Exponent =

Newspaper in Virginia, U.S.

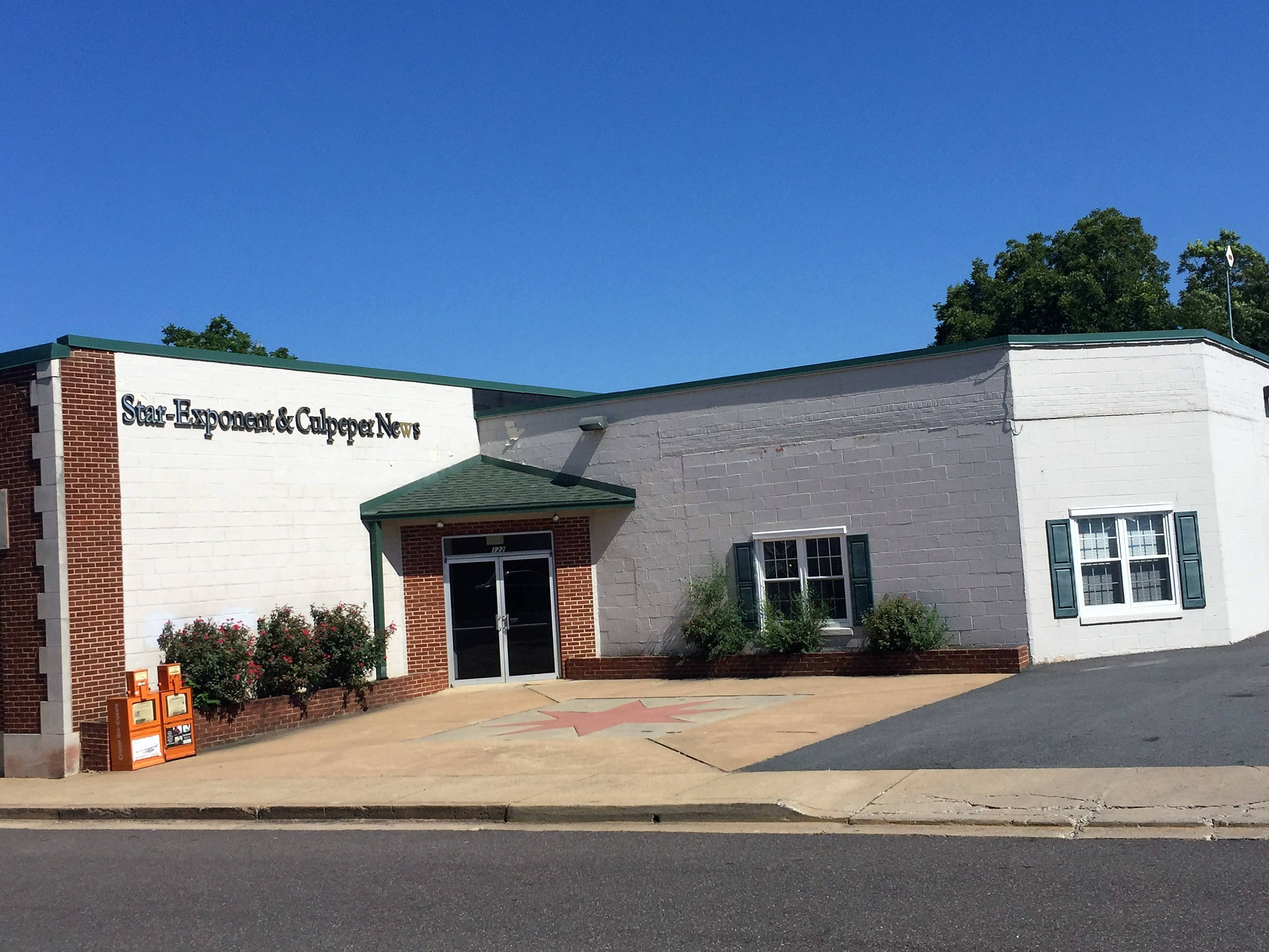
- Type: Daily newspaper
- Format: Broadsheet
- Owner: Lee Enterprises
- Editor: Clint Schemmer (interim)
- Staff writers: Allison Brophy Champion
- Founded: April 15, 1881, as The Exponent
- Headquarters: 122 W Spencer St; Culpeper, Virginia 22701
- Country: United States
- Circulation: 2,738 Daily (as of 2023)
- ISSN: 0899-4803
- OCLC number: 18103326
- Website: starexponent.com

The Culpeper Star-Exponent is a daily newspaper serving Culpeper County, Virginia, United States, published five days a week. It is owned by Lee Enterprises.

== History ==
The first edition of the newspaper was published by Angus McDonald Green, on April 15, 1881, as the Culpeper Exponent.

In 1953, the Exponent merged with its archrival, The Virginia Star (founded in 1919), to create the Star-Exponent. Angus’ brother Raleigh Travers Green edited the paper from 1897 until he died in 1946.

Angus McDonald Green’s grandson, Angus Green, fought in World War II. He studied journalism on the GI Bill, then teamed up with his father, WWI veteran James W. Green, at his Orange County Review.

By the late 1960s, the fourth-generation enterprise also owned the Madison County Eagle, Greene County Record and the Rappahannock County News.

Angus toiled 50 years in community journalism and published local history books under Green Tree Press in the 1970s. In the early 1980s, the Green family sold its newspapers, later bought by Media General of Richmond.

In 2012, BH Media Group purchased the Star-Exponent, after which it was bought by Lee Enterprises in February 2020. Today Star-Exponent staff members cover local news and sports in Culpeper County and neighboring localities.

Starting June 27, 2023, the print edition of the newspaper will be reduced to three days a week: Tuesday, Thursday and Saturday. Also, the newspaper will transition from being delivered by a traditional newspaper delivery carrier to mail delivery by the U.S. Postal Service.
