= Dothan Eagle =

Daily newspaper in Dothan, Alabama

- Type: Daily newspaper
- Format: Broadsheet
- Owner: Lee Enterprises
- Managing editor: Sarah Robinson
- Opinion editor: William Perkins
- Founded: 1908
- Headquarters: 2999 Ross Clark Cir Suite 300; Dothan, Alabama 36301
- Country: United States
- Circulation: 7,667 Daily (as of 2023)
- ISSN: 0745-855X
- OCLC number: 9512126
- Website: dothaneagle.com

The Dothan Eagle is a daily newspaper published in Dothan, Alabama.

== History ==
The newspaper was founded in 1908. It was owned by the Thomson Corporation until 2000, when it was sold to Media General.

In 2012, Media General sold most of its newspapers, including the Eagle, to Berkshire Hathaway. In 2020, the Eagle and all Berkshire Hathaway newspapers were acquired by Lee Enterprises.

Starting June 20, 2023, the print edition of the newspaper will be reduced to three days a week: Tuesday, Thursday and Saturday. Also, the newspaper will transition from being delivered by a traditional newspaper delivery carrier to mail delivery by the U.S. Postal Service.
