= The McDowell News =

- Type: Daily newspaper
- Format: Broadsheet
- Owner: Lee Enterprises
- Publisher: Terry Coomes
- Editor: Scott Hollifield
- Founded: 1923; 103 years ago
- Language: American English
- Headquarters: 136 Logan Street; Marion, North Carolina
- Country: United States
- Circulation: 2,214 Daily (as of 2023)
- OCLC number: 31906140
- Website: mcdowellnews.com

The McDowell News is an English language newspaper published daily in Marion, North Carolina, United States, covering McDowell County. The newspaper is a member of the North Carolina Press Association.

== History ==
The newspaper was owned by Media General until it was sold to Berkshire Hathaway's subsidiary BH Media Group in 2012.

Lee Enterprises bought BH Media Group's publications in early 2020.

Starting June 6, 2023, the print edition of the newspaper will be reduced to three days a week: Tuesday, Thursday and Saturday. Also, the newspaper will transition from being delivered by a traditional newspaper delivery carrier to mail delivery by the U.S. Postal Service.

== See also ==
- List of newspapers in North Carolina
