= Opelika-Auburn News =

Daily newspaper in Alabama, US

- Type: Daily newspaper
- Format: Broadsheet
- Owner: Lee Enterprises
- Publisher: Wynn Christian
- Editor: John Roach
- Founded: September 11, 1890; 135 years ago, as the Opelika Industrial News
- Headquarters: 204 S. 8th St.; Opelika, Alabama 36801
- Country: United States
- Circulation: 5,202 Daily (as of 2023)
- ISSN: 1044-7539
- OCLC number: 11712983
- Website: oanow.com

Logo in 2008

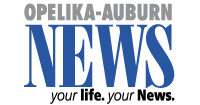
Logo in 2011

The Opelika-Auburn News is a daily newspaper in Alabama, serving Opelika, Auburn, and the communities surrounding Lee County. The newspaper serves to report local, weather, sports, and entertainment news within the areas.

== History ==
The newspaper began as the weekly Opelika Industrial News, on September 11, 1890. Its original publisher was Opelika Steam Print and Pub. Co.

The newspaper remained the Opelika Industrial News until May 30, 1904, when it began publication as the Opelika Daily News.

In 1968, Millard B. Grimes, a well-known publisher and editor from Georgia, and fellow investors purchased the paper, changing its name to the Opelika-Auburn News in 1969. They then sold the paper in 1977 to the Thomson Corporation. It was owned by the Thomson Corporation until 2000, when it was sold to Media General.

In 1995, the News was awarded "Most Improved Daily Newspaper" by the Alabama Press Association. Additionally, the parent company purchased the competing Auburn Bulletin and Lee County Eagle that year.

In the early 2000s, the News was a member of a coalition of newspapers which brought suit against Auburn University to uncover financial misbehavior by trustees.

In 2012, Media General sold most of its newspapers, including the Opelika-Auburn News, to Berkshire Hathaway. Its most recent buyer, Lee Enterprises, purchased the newspaper in 2020.

Starting June 20, 2023, the print edition of the newspaper will be reduced to three days a week: Tuesday, Thursday and Saturday. Also, the newspaper will transition from being delivered by a traditional newspaper delivery carrier to mail delivery by the U.S. Postal Service.

Opelika-Auburn News is issued on paper and online, as well as on microfilm from Auburn University.
