= The News Herald (North Carolina) =

Daily newspaper in North Carolina, U.S.

- Type: Daily newspaper
- Owner: Lee Enterprises
- Publisher: Lamar Smitherman
- Editor: Lisa Wall
- Founded: 1889; 137 years ago, as The Morganton Herald
- Language: American English
- Headquarters: 301 Collett Street; Morganton, North Carolina 28655
- Country: United States
- Circulation: 4,800 Daily (as of 2023)
- ISSN: 8750-3980
- OCLC number: 11378014
- Website: morganton.com

The News Herald is an American, English language daily newspaper based in Morganton, North Carolina covering Burke County, North Carolina. The preceding newspapers include The Morganton Herald (1889–1901) and The Burke County News (1899–1901). The News Herald is a member of the North Carolina Press Association.

== History ==
Predecessor newspapers include:

- The Morganton Herald. (Morganton, N.C.) 1889–1901
- The Burke County News. (Morganton, N.C.) January 13, 1899–November 1901

The newspaper took the name of The News Herald in November 1901.

== See also ==
- List of newspapers in North Carolina
