= Kenosha News =

American daily newspaper

- Type: Daily newspaper
- Format: Broadsheet
- Owner: Lee Enterprises
- Editor: John Sloca
- Founded: September 22, 1894; 131 years ago, as the Kenosha Evening News
- Headquarters: 6535 Green Bay Road; Kenosha, Wisconsin 53142
- Country: United States
- Circulation: 12,907 Daily; 13,684 Sunday (as of 2023)
- ISSN: 0749-713X
- OCLC number: 11167392
- Website: kenoshanews.com

The Kenosha News is a daily newspaper published in Kenosha, Wisconsin, United States. The morning paper serves southeastern Wisconsin and northeastern Illinois. It was the original and flagship property of United Communications Corporation.

The News also prints the free KN Sampler, which is delivered by mail to homes in the city of Kenosha, as well as select ZIP Codes in Lake County, Illinois.

In January 2019, Lee Enterprises purchased the Kenosha News, as well as its sister paper, the Lake Geneva Regional News, from United Communications Corporation.

== History ==
=== Early years ===
The Kenosha News traces its history back to Wisconsin's first newspaper, the Green-Bay Intelligencer, founded in 1833. In 1837, the Intelligencer was purchased by Charles Sholes, who moved his printing plant to Kenosha three years later and began printing the Southport Telegraph. Sholes' brother Christopher, sometimes described as the inventor of the typewriter, subsequently purchased the Telegraph from Charles. After merging with the Kenosha Tribune in 1855 and the Kenosha Courier in 1888, the weekly newspaper became known as the Telegraph-Courier.

The Evening News had been the dream of Frank Haydon Hall, whose ambition was to establish a daily newspaper for the growing community where he had settled a few years before. In August 1891, Hall, who was also a partner in a large Chicago printing firm, purchased the Telegraph-Courier from Levi Cass. The venerable weekly, which continued as a sister publication to the Evening News, became the springboard for Hall's new daily. In those days, it was common for a newspaper to openly support one of the political parties, and the Evening News was no exception. It would be, Hall declared, "dedicated to the principles" of the then-dominant Republican Party.

The Kenosha Evening News was first published on the afternoon of September 22, 1894. During its first two years of publication, the newspaper had a circulation of fewer than 400 copies. The number of copies sold daily increased to 1,100 at the turn of the 20th century, and to more than 3,000 by 1915. After World War I, daily circulation tripled, to nearly 10,000 in 1925. By 1947, the figure topped 18,000. Today's Kenosha News circulation averages around 22,000 copies.

The early Evening News was a simple six-column, four-page broadsheet, printed on a cylinder press and folded by hand. Its first subscriber, reportedly, was Johnson A. Jackson, secretary-treasurer of a local factory that manufactured baby furniture. Its second was Eugene R. Head, who, two years later, would own the Evening News.

In the earliest days, national and world news was reprinted, mostly from Chicago and Milwaukee papers, with the inevitable delays. In 1898, during the Spanish–American War, the News tentatively experimented with a more timely approach. It received a brief daily telegraphed summary of war news from the American Press Association.

For the first seven years of Evening News George W. Johnston was city editor, the paper's only reporter and general jack-of-all-trades. He later bought his own newspaper, becoming editor and publisher of the Campbellsport News.

In early 1896, Hall decided to sell the Evening News and Telegraph-Courier to Head, a member of one of Kenosha's best known families. Until he purchased the papers, the 30-year-old Head had been associated with his father's lumber business. Head ran the business and wrote editorials, with Johnston continuing to gather and write the local news. In 1897, they were joined by George P. Hewitt of Appleton, Wisconsin. The new partners formed a successful team, with Head managing the business end of things, and Hewitt, a trained newsman, handling the editorial duties.

Almost immediately, Head and Hewitt abandoned the old practice of having "boilerplate" pages, non-timely "news," feature material, serial novels and the like, printed in Chicago. The Kenosha Evening News became one of the first "homeprint" newspapers in Wisconsin, with the entire issue printed locally in its downtown plant.

Head and Hewitt also built a thriving real estate company. During the partnership's first several years, substantial profits from land dealing were plowed back into the newspaper. In 1898, to accommodate advertising demands, the size of the daily was doubled, from four to eight pages. By the end of the nineteenth century, the Evening News was on a solid business footing.

=== Early 20th century ===
In 1901, George Hewitt left the Evening News to enter the automobile industry. His interest in the paper was sold to Samuel S. Simmons, a member of another prominent Kenosha family and nephew of local industrial giant Zalmon G. Simmons of the Simmons Bedding Company.

Genial Sam Simmons left a position with the Chicago Gas Company to edit his hometown daily newspaper. The new partnership of Eugene Head and Simmons continued until 1913, when they incorporated as the Head-Simmons Publishing Co.

When Hewitt left the paper in 1901, so did George Johnston, who was replaced as city editor by Walter T. Marlatt, a Hoosier and the first of a family of newsmen who would be associated with the Evening News for a half century.

In 1903, the linotype and a technique called stereotyping, a process for molding semi-circular printing plates for the new rotary press, were introduced. Before the newspaper got its first linotype machine – it would add two more in 1913 and, eventually own 13 before they were replaced by computer-generated typesetting in the 1970s – all type was hand set.

The linotype machine did away with the letter-by-letter, line-by-line manual task, casting entire lines of type in molten metal, 550 degrees hot. The linotype was an automatic, keyboard-operated machine that had been invented about 20 years earlier and still was not in common use. The linotype clicked and clacked, whirred and vibrated. One by one, slugs of lead type were molded, a line at a time, six lines a minute, 360 an hour. A typical operator might set 10,000 words of newspaper copy each work shift.

On September 7, 1915, Eugene Head died suddenly at the age of 48. Head had taken the struggling newspaper and built it into one of the most successful dailies in southern Wisconsin in less than 20 years. His death brought a reorganization of Head-Simmons Publishing Co., with Sam Simmons filling the vacant office of publisher.

City editor Walter Marlatt became editor. Marlatt had begun his journalism career in 1889 as a cub reporter in Indiana. After newspaper jobs in Indianapolis, Philadelphia, New York and Chicago, he had come to Kenosha in 1896 as headmaster of a private school. He joined the Evening News after a short stint as editor of the weekly Kenosha Daily Union.

Ralph S. Kingsley, who started as bookkeeper in 1908 and advanced to assistant business manager, became business manager. Eugene's son, Clarence E. Head, who joined the paper in 1913 and would remain active in its management for nearly 59 years, was named assistant business manager.

On March 8, 1917, Simmons died suddenly at age 47. The death of the well-liked publisher caused a major disruption of the business for almost eight months, until Simmons' estate was settled.

In October 1917, a new company, the Kenosha News Publishing Co., was organized by Marlatt, Kingsley and Clarence Head. It purchased the entire holdings of the Head-Simmons Publishing Co., and took over the newspaper and the large printing establishment. Marlatt became president, Head became vice president and assistant business manager and Kingsley served as secretary-treasurer and business manager.

Marlatt was an energetic and enlightened progressive, actively promoting a number of important civic causes. He served on the city council for six years and was considered the father of Kenosha's public health and park ordinances.

It was during Marlatt's watch that the Evening News took on some of the key editorial elements of a modern newspaper, including a sports page and a society section that, unlike many Wisconsin papers of that era, was allowed to give fair coverage to the women's suffrage movement.

In the summer of 1914, the paper joined the Associated Press and received a bulletin service by long distance telephone, supplemented by mailed releases. Then, for several years, the Evening News relied on a telegraphed bulletin service, usually not more than a single column of late news each day.

In 1917, United Press service was added to AP, an hour and a half a day of telegraphed news highlights. Two years later, AP's full-time leased wire service was installed. At that time, the newspaper hired Charlotte "Charlie" Oakes, an experienced operator from South Dakota to monitor the machine that transcribed the incoming news stories on a typewriter.

An automatic teletype machine, which was 50 percent faster than the best Morse operator, was introduced to the newsroom in 1926. It could produce both typed copy and punched ticker tape to be fed directly into the linotypes. These clattering devices continued to bring the world to the Evening News editorial office until the advent of a computerized system in the mid-1970s.

Wire service news gave the local paper an advantage over its Milwaukee and Chicago newsstand rivals. Besides its coverage of local happenings, the Evening News could, because of its later deadlines, bring readers more late-breaking national and international news than the competing big city papers. Later, in 1922, radio added another dimension to Evening News coverage of events elsewhere in the country and the world. A powerful receiver was installed in the editor's office and monitored for breaking news reports.

The first news of President Warren Harding's death in August 1923 reached the editorial office by radio. Radio broadcasts also usually beat the wire services with sports scores and stock market reports.

The Evening News also subscribed to the Newspaper Enterprise Association, which supplied features, non-timely interpretive stories, illustrations and photographs in matrix form. The National Newspaper Syndicate also furnished feature materials, including such comic strips as "Salesman Sam" and "The Duffs."

In its early days, the Evening News could be purchased at the newspaper's office, or from newsstands or "street boys." In later years, home delivery was left to a series of independent dealers. That all changed April 1, 1921, when the company organized its own "guaranteed" delivery service to some 700 Kenosha homes. Within three years, 4,000 homes in the city and in other smaller communities in Kenosha County were getting doorstep delivery.

By the newspaper's 30th anniversary, in 1924, there were 80 people on its payroll and 58 carrier boys delivering papers throughout the county.

In April 1925, Walter Marlatt became ill at his desk and died a short time later at home. His brother, city editor Ernest F. Marlatt, was promoted to editor and corporate secretary. The younger Marlatt, with a master's degree from Harvard, had come to the News in 1917 from Indiana, where he had been a high school principal and superintendent of schools. As city editor, he supervised the two general assignment reporters who covered government, police and courts. He remained in the editor's chair for 23 years, during which time his staff grew to eight.

Business operations were assumed by Kingsley, who became publisher and president. He led the corporation until his death in 1963, guiding the newspaper safely though the Depression. He also was active in numerous civic efforts such as Kenosha Youth Foundation, United Fund and the Chamber of Commerce.

Meanwhile, the circulation of the Evening News, under the guidance of Willis H. Schulte, had shifted almost entirely to home delivery, through the development of a carrier-merchant plan. The News also became a member of the Audit Bureau of Circulations, assuring advertisers of accurate circulation figures.

Schulte, who began his long association with the paper as a seven-year-old newsboy in 1914, was 17 when he was placed in charge of circulation. As his career progressed into six decades, it was estimated that he had supervised and influenced some 6,500 newspaper carrier boys and girls. In later years, his work was carried on in the circulation department, first by Frank Sisk, and now by James F. Jones.

=== After World War II ===
As World War II ended, so did the century-long history of the Evening News' companion publication, the Telegraph-Courier. Since 1894 the weekly Telegraph-Courier had served Kenoshans who preferred a summary of six days' worth of local events.

Shortly before the formal opening of the remodeled building, longtime editor Ernie Marlatt had a heart attack at his desk and died. However, the Marlatt name, in the person of his nephew, Walter "Bus" Marlatt Jr., outdoor writer and conservationist, continued at the paper for another decade.

F. Lee Hancock, an experienced newsman from Superior, Wisconsin, arrived as managing editor in June 1947. When Marlatt died, he assumed direction of the newsroom, and, eventually, in 1963, was formally promoted to editor.

Jim Barnhill, the newspaper's sports editor and, incidentally, a professional football official, replaced Hancock as managing editor.

Willis H. Schulte became general manager in 1955, and, corporate president upon Ralph S. Kingsley's death in 1963. After Bill Schulte died on April 26, 1979, his long record of civic activities was recognized with the naming of a 3.3-acre (13,000 m^{2}) city park in his honor.

=== 1960-2019 ===
In 1961, controlling interest in the Kenosha News passed to Howard J. Brown, a newspaperman with experience in Chicago, Cleveland and at several small dailies in the east. Brown said of the newspaper business, "It is not a business at all. Nor is it a way of life or even a philosophy. Newspapering, in short, is a delightful disease, the only cure for which is heavier doses of the same."

On Monday, April 30, 1962, the 67-year-old Kenosha Evening News nameplate disappeared forever, replaced on the masthead by the Kenosha News. The dropping of the word "Evening" was done quietly and without fanfare.

In the 1970s, the Kenosha News offices at Seventh Avenue and 58th Street underwent its third major remodeling, which included the replacement of its old letterpress with the first Goss Cosmo offset press ever built, and, perhaps the most revolutionary, computerized typesetting. Electronic journalism had driven "hot metal" from the newsroom's back shop. They also introduced the popular Kenosha Kid article.

Editor Lee Hancock retired at the beginning of 1976, replaced by Richard D. Martin, who came to Kenosha after serving 10 years as editor of the Chronicle-Tribune in Marion, Indiana. Martin was only the eighth editor in the newspaper's 100-year history.

The paper was published just six days a week, Monday through Saturday. In May 1980, the slim Saturday edition was dropped, replaced by the multi-section Sunday Kenosha News. The loss of the Saturday paper was not popular, however, and seven years later, on May 9, 1987, the News returned to Saturday publication, becoming a true 7-day-a-week daily.

The daily newspaper, in time, became one element in a larger corporate structure called United Communications Corporation. In December 1988, Eugene Schulte, Willis' son and long a part of the News' management team, became senior vice president of the corporation.

On August 12, 1991, the Kenosha News became a morning newspaper. The move from afternoon to morning was explained as a response to changing advertising needs and reader lifestyles.

In 1992, Kenneth L. Dowdell, director of public service, and Ronald J. Montemurro, controller of United Communications Corporation, were named corporate vice presidents.

On December 31, 1995, editor Richard D. Martin retired at age 62. During Martin's tenure, the News won several awards for its news and photo coverage. In 1989, the Kenosha News was one of 74 finalists among 465 newspapers in an American Society of Newspaper Editors' survey seeking excellence in small daily newspapers.

Martin was replaced in mid-January 1996 by Craig W. Swanson, who was previously editor of the Lincoln Journal, an afternoon newspaper that merged with the morning Lincoln Star.. Prior to working at the Journal, Swanson spent four years as editor of the Herald-Palladium in St. Joseph, Michigan, and five years as editor of The Mining Journal in Marquette, Michigan. He began his newspaper career as a reporter at the Daily News in Iron Mountain, Michigan, in 1975. Swanson retired in 2009, citing personal reasons.

=== Lee Enterprises (2019-present) ===
In January 2019, Lee Enterprises purchased Kenosha News from United Communications. The sale also included the Lake Geneva Regional News. Mark Lewis, publisher of the Racine Journal Times, was named head of the new media group comprising all three publications.

In 2020, Kenosha News digital editor Daniel Thompson resigned in protest over a headline regarding a Black Lives Matter protest following the shooting of Jacob Blake. The headline was later changed, after his resignation.

In November 2025, The Kenosha News moved to a six-day printing schedule, eliminating its printed Monday edition.

== Buildings ==
In 1894, the Evening News' home was the "Flatiron" building, which still stands at 5901 Sixth Avenue, at the corner of Main and Park. Initially, the newspaper used only the first floor offices, and the pressroom was located in the building's small basement. A few years later, it expanded to an upper floor, where a newsroom was established.

By 1903, the Evening News and Telegraph-Courier had outgrown the "Flatiron" building and moved to a building on the north side of Wisconsin Street. The building, which no longer stands, was located on today's 600 block of 58th Street. With this move, the daily newspaper modernized, installing a Cranston perfecting press that could simultaneously print eight newspaper page edition. Within five years, it was outdated and was replaced with a web press that could print 8,000 copies per hour.

On March 7, 1913, in a front-page story, the Evening News announced plans to erect a new newspaper plant one block west, on the opposite side of Wisconsin Street, today's corner of Seventh Avenue and 58th Street. "It is proposed," the story said, "to make this the permanent home of the Kenosha Evening News." Though the building has undergone three major remodelings and several additions, it remains the current home of the Kenosha News.

The new fireproof brick newspaper plant was designed by Head, based on his experience in the printing business. In August 1913, the Kenosha Evening News moved into its new home. The offices, business and editorial departments, were located on the first floor, along with the job printing department, which had become an important income source for the Head-Simmons Publishing Co.

The job shop was responsible for printing, illustrating, cutting and binding of all kinds of labels, circulars, booklets and programs. It handled local publications like the Women's Club bulletin and the high school newspaper, Kenews. Customers could have stationery, posters, handbills and many other items printed.

Installed in the building's basement was the newspaper's own brand-new high speed rotary color press, which printed 18,000 copies per hour and was the first of its kind in Wisconsin.

The entire second floor was built as a lodge hall and, for a number of years, was home to the Loyal Order of Moose. During World War I, the newspaper's hall was turned into a recreation center for soldiers and sailors who visited from the northern Illinois training camps.

The Evening News again outgrew its facilities and an addition was constructed west of the existing building. When it formally opened February 19, 1924, the newspaper plant's floor space doubled and the building's general layout would continue for a quarter century.

The composing room, editorial and advertising offices were moved to the second floor. The job printing department was housed on the first floor. The basement area was used for storage, including a fireproof vault to store bound copies of local newspapers, some dating back as far as 1840. Amenities were impressive, a ladies rest room, tiled toilets, ample natural skylighting, a marble stairway and attractive decor.

In the addition's basement a new Goss Straightline press was installed. It was a 30-ton, 13-foot (4.0 m)-high behemoth capable of printing 32-page newspapers with various color options at a speed of 25,000 copies per hour.

In 1948, the News building underwent a complete remodeling. The job printing shop disappeared, its first floor space given over to the business and advertising departments. The composing room was enlarged and a photo darkroom was installed.

Highlighting the renovation was the installation of a five-unit color press, three times the size of the one it replaced. It could print up to 80 pages at once, while cutting the press run of 18,000 copies to less than two hours. Through a large picture window fronting on 58th Street, passers by could watch the daily being printed.

The 1980s also saw the construction of a 16,000-square-foot (1,500 m^{2}) distribution center, including insertion equipment to accommodate the growth of preprinted advertising sections.

== Advertising changes ==
By 1920, it was clear that streamlining and specialization was needed in the advertising department. So business manager Ralph S. Kingsley divided it into two sections, one focusing on traditional display advertising by businesses, the other to handle the growing want ad columns. These small ads have appeared in the News since its first edition, when a dozen were lumped together in a daily bargain column, which, after a century, still survives as Kenosha Kernels.

Initially, the newspaper treated these few ads as something of a nuisance, a necessary nuisance, perhaps, but not a major revenue source. As their number grew, however, want ads claimed their own section of the newspaper and took on greater importance.

In 1905, approximately 65 want ads appeared daily and by 1910, there were about 100. This increased to perhaps 200 in 1920. Readers had come to rely on them to such an extent that the News bragged these little ads had become as much a public utility as the electric or telephone companies.

In 1923, the Evening News installed a new indexing system, the Basil L. Smith Co. National Standard, which divided all these advertisements into 11 main classifications, such as merchandise, real estate, business services. These were split into sub-categories, some 90 in all, making it easy for readers to quickly locate ads of interest to them.

Soon, the newspaper could say it ran more daily classifieds than any other Wisconsin publication, except one in Milwaukee. In 1925, it included some 300 to 500 daily, and today the number often tops 1,000, not including automobile, help wanted and real estate business ads also handled by the classified department.

== Bob the Evening News Dog ==
Editor-publisher Frank Haydon Hall had just three employees when the Kenosha Evening News started in 1894. A decade later, the staff had grown to a half dozen—and Bob the Evening News Dog. According to legend, Bob, "a dog of genial nature and remarkable intelligence," was brought to Kenosha as a pup around 1898, probably by the editor. For a dozen years, he was a regular fixture in the newspaper office.

Bob visited downtown shopkeepers and wagged greetings to countless friends, particularly the children. He had a reputation as "champion rat dog of the city," which he proved by keeping the Evening News and neighboring buildings mostly rodent-free.

When the old dog died, October 7, 1910, his passing was marked with a page one eulogy: "He was taken with his fatal malady on Thursday and paid his last visit to his old haunts during the afternoon ... and when he reached his bed, he never left it. Death came as a result of advanced years. A good dog, a companionable little fellow, he will be greatly missed by those who had been accustomed to see him daily during his life!"
