= Watertown Public Opinion =

Newspaper in Watertown, South Dakota

- Type: Daily newspaper
- Format: Broadsheet
- Owner: Lee Enterprises
- Founder: L.D. Lyon
- Founded: 1887
- Language: English
- Headquarters: 120 Third Avenue NW, Watertown, South Dakota 57201 United States
- Circulation: 9,336 (as of 2015)
- Website: thepublicopinion.com

The Watertown Public Opinion is a newspaper published in Watertown, South Dakota, United States, serving eastern South Dakota and western Minnesota. It is fourth largest newspaper in South Dakota and publishes Tuesday through Saturday.

== History ==
On April 1, 1887, L.D. Lyon published the first edition of the Watertown Public Opinion, two years before South Dakota statehood. He was soon sued for libel. In 1893, Lyon sold the Public Opinion to Herbert Geddes, A.W. Ransom, and Frank J. Cory, the owners of the Watertown Daily News, who then merged the two papers.

In 1908, Stitzel X. Way purchased the paper for $25,000 and succeeded Cory as editor. Two years later he was sued for libel. S.X. Way published the paper until his death in 1942. His son Kenneth B. Way then took over as publisher, and in 1985 was succeeded by John R. Lowrie. His son Steve Lowrie became general manager in 1988, and publisher in 1994.

After 94 years of family ownership, the Public Opinion was acquired by United Communications Corporation in 2002, Schurz Communications in 2016, and GateHouse Media in 2019. Later that year the company merged with Gannett, and then was renamed to USA Today Co. in 2025. Lee Enterprises acquired the Public Opinion in 2026.

== Hall of Fame ==
Former owner Kenneth B. Way was inducted into the South Dakota Hall of Fame in 1999, followed by the South Dakota Newspaper Hall of Fame in 2016.
