= The News Virginian =

Daily American newspaper

- Front page on July 27, 2005
- Type: Daily newspaper (Tuesday-Thursday-Saturday print schedule)
- Format: Broadsheet
- Owner: Lee Enterprises
- Publisher: Peter S. Yates
- Managing editor: Derek M. Armstrong
- General manager: Pete Lynch
- Founded: 1901; 124 years ago, as the Valley Virginian
- Language: English
- Headquarters: 201C Rosser Avenue; Waynesboro, Virginia 22980
- Country: United States
- Circulation: 2,875 Daily (as of 2023)
- ISSN: 8750-7862
- OCLC number: 11779672
- Website: newsvirginian.com

The News Virginian is a newspaper owned by Lee Enterprises. The paper serves residents in the cities of Waynesboro and Staunton, Virginia, as well as Augusta and Nelson counties.

== History ==
The News Virginian traces its publishing history to the Valley Virginian, which issued its first edition in 1901. The Valley Virginian consolidated with the Waynesboro News in November 1929, becoming the Waynesboro News-Virginian by owner / publisher Louis Spilman. In 1960, the paper took on its current moniker of The News Virginian.

At some point, the paper was acquired by Media General. On May 17, 2012, it was announced that investment company Berkshire Hathaway would be acquiring Media General's newspaper division. The deal closed June 25, 2012, with Berkshire Hathaway subsidiary BH Media Group as the new owner and publisher.

BH Media Group hired Lee Enterprises to manage its newspapers and websites starting on July 2, 2018.

On January 29, 2020, Lee Enterprises announced an agreement to buy BH Media Group' newspapers, including The News Virginian. The acquisition was completed on March 16, 2020.

In 2023, the paper's subscription costs were increased, despite switching from traditional delivery to being delivered through the mail, and the reduction of its weekly print run to a Tuesday-Thursday-Saturday schedule.
