= The Morning News (American newspaper) =

Newspaper based in Florence, South Carolina

- Type: Daily newspaper
- Owner(s): Lee Enterprises
- Publisher: Bailey Dabney
- Editor: Don Kausler Jr.
- Founded: March 18, 1922; 103 years ago, as the Weekly News and Review
- City: Florence, South Carolina
- Country: United States
- Circulation: 4,787 Daily (as of 2023)
- ISSN: 1085-2131
- OCLC number: 27969756
- Website: scnow.com

The Morning News is a daily newspaper published in Florence, South Carolina. It is owned by Lee Enterprises.

== History ==
It was founded as the Farmers' Friend in 1887, and was part of several mergers and name changes. In its early history, it was aligned with the Democratic Party.

The first edition of the newspaper as the Weekly News and Review, appeared on March 18, 1922. Its immediate predecessor was the Florence News and Review, and its name was later changed to the Morning News Review. In February 1928, it purchased the Florence Daily Times and the name was changed to the Florence Morning News.

In 1945, it became the Florence Morning News. In 1956, then-editor Jack O'Dowd, the son of the newspaper's publisher, enraged the Ku Klux Klan by supporting the U.S. Supreme Court's Brown v. Board of Education desegregation decision and he was run out of town, going to a job with the Chicago Sun-Times. The only other South Carolina newspaper that took the progressive stance in the 1950s and 1960s was the Greenwood Index Journal. O'Dowd was replaced by James A. Rogers, who while also somewhat progressive editorially, took a less confrontational posture. Rogers wrote several books on the region and was instrumental in the creation of Francis Marion College in 1970, now Francis Marion University. He retired as editor in 1975.

The Florence Morning News was purchased by Thomson Newspapers, later The Thomson Corporation in December 1981. Thomson worked to expand the newspaper from a Florence-focused newspaper to more regional coverage. It was extensively redesigned in 1992, and again in 1998, to emphasize coverage of the nine-county Pee Dee region of South Carolina.

On June 14, 2000, the Thomson Corporation sold the Morning News, as well as associated newspapers in the Pee Dee to Media General for approximately $237 million. The acquisition by Media General made the newspaper a partner with CBS affiliate WBTW, a station MG gained after an acquisition of Spartan Communications earlier in the year.

In 2012, Berkshire Hathaway acquired the Morning News as part of an acquisition of Media General's newspaper group.

The Morning News serves as the regional hub for four weekly newspaper publications also owned by Lee Enterprises: The Hartsville Messenger, The Lake City News and Post, The Marion Star & Mullins Enterprise, and The (Hemingway) Weekly Observer.

The Morning News operates online through scnow.com. That website houses not only the Morning News, but also the Hartsville Messenger, Weekly Observer, The Lake City News and Post, and the Marion Star & Mullins Enterprise. Until Media General sold its entire newspaper division to Berkshire Hathaway, it also housed WBTW as well.

Starting June 6, 2023, the print edition of the newspaper will be reduced to three days a week: Tuesday, Thursday and Saturday. Also, the newspaper will transition from being delivered by a traditional newspaper delivery carrier to mail delivery by the U.S. Postal Service.
