= Independent Record =

Daily newspaper based in Helena, Montana

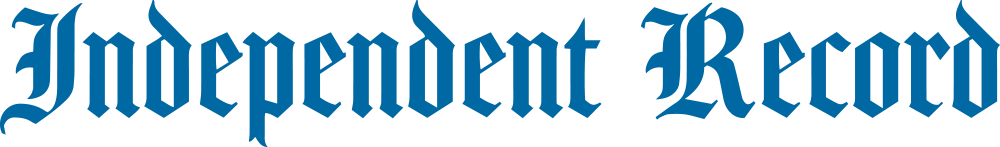
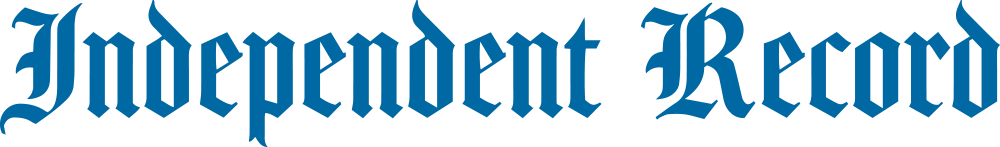
- Type: Daily newspaper
- Format: Broadsheet
- Owner: Lee Enterprises
- Publisher: Bill Merrill
- Editor: Phil Drake
- Founded: August 2, 1867, as The Daily Herald and October 12, 1867, as The Weekly Independent
- Language: English
- Headquarters: Helena, Montana
- Country: United States
- Circulation: 14,083 Daily (as of 2023)
- ISSN: 2326-9588 (print); 2326-9596 (web)
- OCLC number: 11978496
- Website: helenair.com

The Independent Record (often abbreviated to IR) is a daily newspaper printed and distributed in Helena, Montana. The newspaper is owned by Lee Enterprises.

== History ==
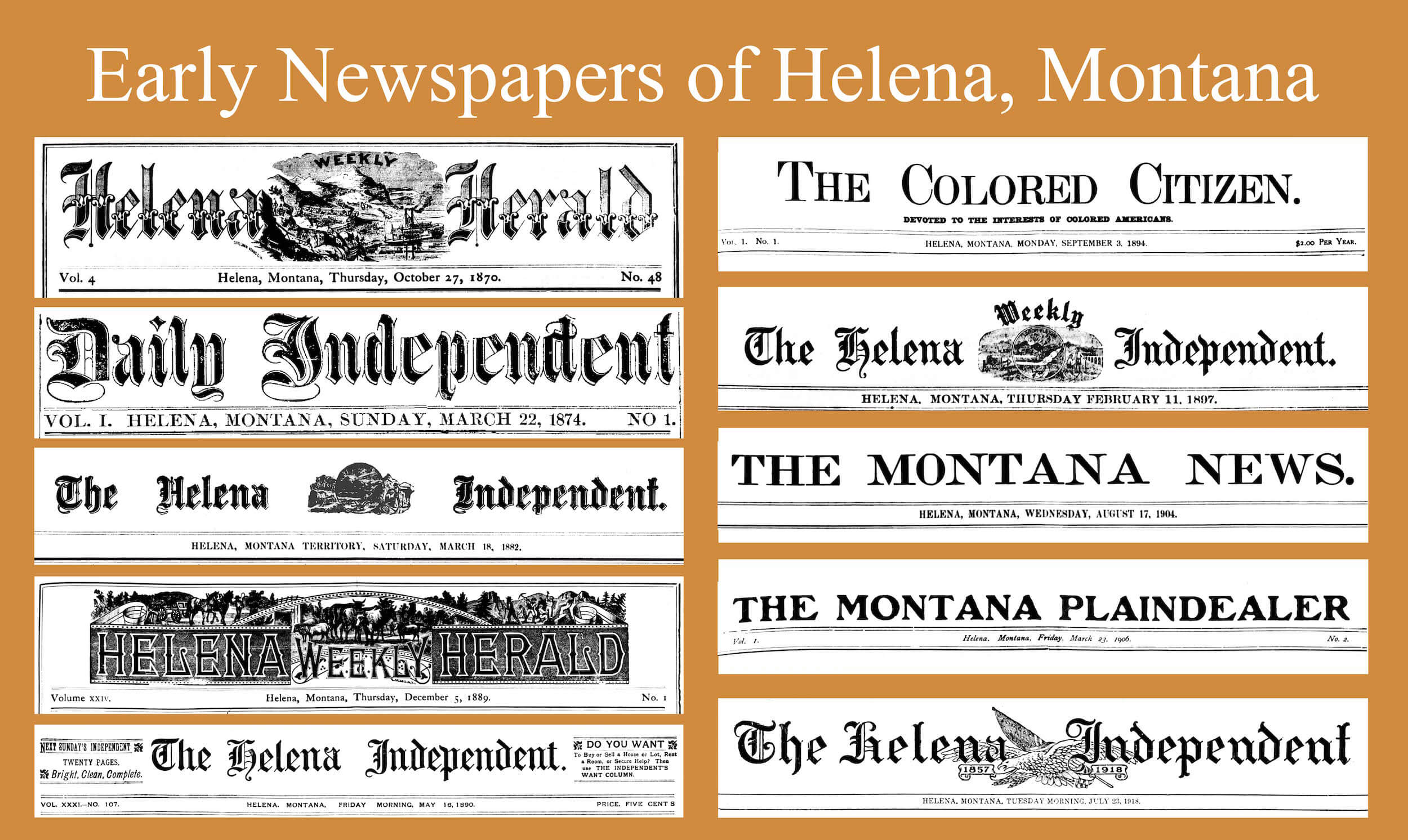
Early Helena newspapers included The Daily Independent and The Helena Weekly Independent.

The roots of the IR lie in two newspapers that were founded in 1867, The Daily Herald of Helena and The Weekly Independent of Deer Lodge.

The Daily Herald started publishing in Helena on August 2, 1867. The Weekly Independent started publishing in Deer Lodge on October 12, 1867, and then moved to Helena in March 1874, and began publication as The Daily Independent, and then, in 1875, as The Helena Independent.

In 1916, the Herald merged with The Montana Daily Record, which was founded in August 1900. The new publication was renamed The Montana Record-Herald. Additionally, on November 22, 1943, another merger followed: this time with The Helena Independent, to become the Independent Record.

After over thirty years of ownership by the Anaconda Copper Mining Company, the IR was sold to Lee Enterprises in 1959. The IR converted from hot metal to phototypesetting in 1973, and in 1975, installed one of the first newsroom computer systems. In the summer of 2002, a new press plant was opened and housed in a new 30,000-square-foot (2,800 m^{2}) printing and distribution center.

Starting July 11, 2023, the print edition of the newspaper will be reduced to three days a week: Tuesday, Thursday and Saturday. Also, the newspaper will transition from being delivered by a traditional newspaper delivery carrier to mail delivery by the U.S. Postal Service.

== See also ==
- Montana Free Press, an investigative journalism organization based in Helena, Montana
