= Independent Tribune =

Newspaper based in Concord, North Carolina

- Type: Tri-weekly newspaper
- Owner: Lee Enterprises
- Editor: Mark Plemmons
- Founded: September 29, 1996; 29 years ago
- Language: English
- Headquarters: Concord, North Carolina
- Country: United States
- OCLC number: 664151062
- Website: independenttribune.com

Independent Tribune is a newspaper based in Concord, North Carolina covering Cabarrus County. The newspaper is owned by Lee Enterprises.

== History ==
The Independent Tribune was formed September 29, 1996, with the merger of The Concord Tribune and The Daily Independent of Kannapolis, North Carolina.

It was originally a daily newspaper, but changed to three days a week in 2009.

On May 17, 2012, Media General announced the sale of its newspapers to Berkshire Hathaway's BH Media.

On January 29, 2020, Lee Enterprises announced it would buy BH Media, including 30 newspapers.
