= Martinsville Bulletin =

Daily American newspaper

- Type: Daily newspaper
- Owner(s): Lee Enterprises
- Publisher: George H. Harris Jr.
- Editor: Michael Owens
- Founded: 1889; 136 years ago, as The Henry Bulletin
- Headquarters: 204 Broad Street; Martinsville, Virginia 24115
- Country: United States
- Circulation: 4,704 Daily (as of 2023)
- OCLC number: 33396323
- Website: martinsvillebulletin.com

The Martinsville Bulletin is a daily newspaper serving the city of Martinsville and the surrounding Henry County, Virginia. The Bulletin's roots date back to 1889, and it is the oldest continuously run business in Martinsville. The paper is owned by Lee Enterprises.

== History ==
The paper was started in 1889, as a weekly publication called The Henry Bulletin, serving Henry County and Martinsville. The Bulletin increased its publication frequency, until it eventually became a daily paper in 1935 and was renamed The Daily Bulletin.

In a deal announced on March 31, 2015, the Bulletin and The Franklin News-Post were purchased from Haskell Newspapers by BH Media Group. Haskell Newspapers was a company privately owned by the Haskell family. The Haskell family bought the Martinsville Bulletin in 1948. With the culmination of the purchase, BH Media owns nine daily newspapers in Virginia.

Starting June 27, 2023, the print edition of the newspaper will be reduced to three days a week: Tuesday, Thursday and Saturday. Also, the newspaper will transition from being delivered by a traditional newspaper delivery carrier to mail delivery by the U.S. Postal Service.
