= Lee Enterprises =

American media company

Lee Enterprises, Inc.

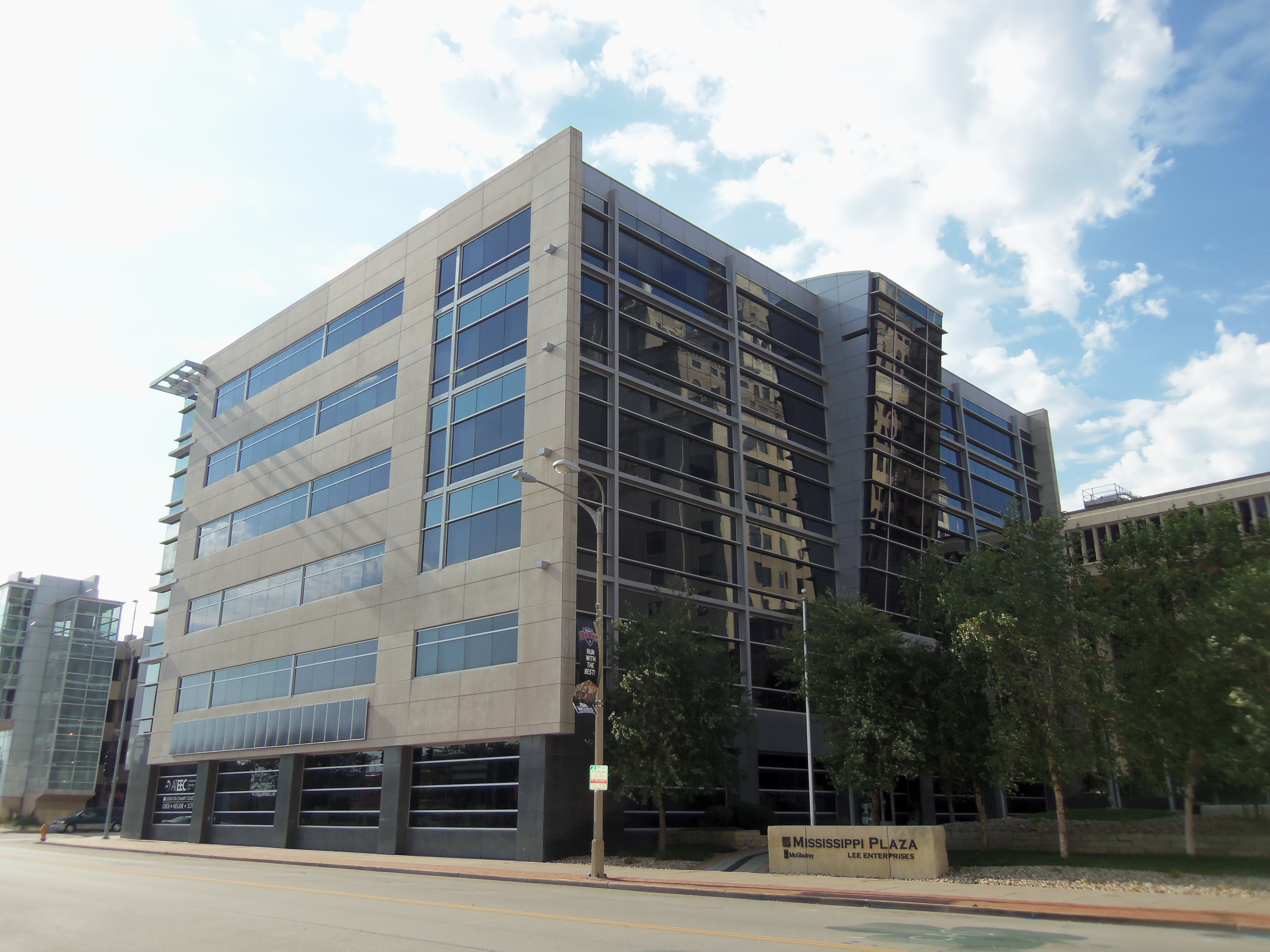
- Lee headquarters
- Type: Public
- Traded as: Nasdaq: LEE; Russell Microcap Index component
- Industry: Media
- Founded: 1890; 136 years ago
- Founder: Alfred Wilson Lee
- Headquarters: Davenport, Iowa, United States
- Key people: Mary Junck (chairman); Kevin Mowbray (president & CEO)
- Products: Newspapers and digital media
- Revenue: ▼US$611.4 million (2024)
- Operating income: ▼US$4.55 million (2024)
- Net income: ▼US$−32.8 million (2024)
- Total assets: ▼US$649.2 million (2024)
- Number of employees: 4,365 (2022)
- Website: lee.net

Lee Enterprises, Inc. is a publicly traded American media company. It publishes 72 daily newspapers in 25 states, and more than 350 weekly, classified, and specialty publications. Lee Enterprises was founded in 1890 by Alfred Wilson Lee and is based in Davenport, Iowa.

The company also provides online services, including websites supporting its daily newspapers and other publications. Lee had more than 26 million unique web and mobile visitors monthly, with 229.1 million pages viewed. Lee became majority partner of TownNews.com in 1996; Town News creates software for newspaper publication purposes. The company offers commercial printing services to its customers.

Lee Enterprises is currently the fourth-largest newspaper group in the United States of America. The company acquired Howard Publications (16 daily newspapers) for $694 million in 2002 and Pulitzer, Inc. (14 daily, over 100 non-daily), for $1.5 billion in 2005.

== History ==
=== 21st century ===
In 2000, Lee sold its broadcasting division to pay off debt and to focus on newspaper publishing. Most of the TV stations were sold to Emmis Communications and as of 2007 had been sold onward to other companies.

==== Chapter 11 bankruptcy and bailout reorganization ====
In 2011, the company filed for Chapter 11 bankruptcy. It emerged from bankruptcy less than two months later. In April 2012, Warren Buffett's Berkshire Hathaway Inc. took a stake in Lee Enterprises, buying $85 million of the company's debt from Goldman Sachs Group.

In June 2012, Berkshire Hathaway filed an amended Form 13F (13F-HR/A) for the period ending March 31, 2012. This document disclosed that Berkshire accumulated $2,119,000 or 1,655,125 common shares of Lee Enterprises, or a 3.2 percent stake. The document said that Berkshire had asked the SEC to keep the transaction secret, a request denied on May 25, 2012.

From January 2012 to April 2017, the company's executive chairman, Mary Junck, was chairman of the Associated Press. In December 2018, Lee Enterprises announced that Mary Junck would switch from Executive Chairman to chairman of the company.

In April 2013, Lee Enterprises announced that Berkshire Hathaway refinanced the remaining Pulitzer acquisition debt equating to $94 million, at no cost. The collateral involved was the TNI Partner stake including the Arizona Daily Star and azstarnet.com. This produced a reduction in interest from a variable rate of 11.3% to a fixed rate of 9%, and an extension of the debt maturity date of the debt from December 2015 to April 2017. At the time of the announcement Lee Enterprises noted there was $893 million left to pay off. Lee paid off and retired its New Pulitzer notes in June 2015, six months before the original maturity date and 22 months before the new maturity date. Lee also refinanced its remaining debt in 2014 in order to extend the maturities from 2015 and 2017 to 2019 and 2022. Lee retired its 1st Lien Term Loan in November 2018, four months before its scheduled March 2019 maturity.

On June 27, 2018, Lee Enterprises and Berkshire Hathaway reached a five-year agreement to allow Lee Enterprises to manage Berkshire Hathaway's newspaper and digital operations.

==== Acquisition of BH Media Group ====
On January 29, 2020, Lee Enterprises announced an agreement to buy Berkshire Hathaway's BH Media Group publications and The Buffalo News for $140 million in cash. The acquisition comprised 30 daily newspapers in 10 states plus 49 paid weekly publications with digital sites, as well as 32 other print products. Daily papers include the Omaha World-Herald, Richmond Times-Dispatch, Tulsa World, and Winston-Salem Journal. As part of the agreement, Lee leased BH Media's real estate for 10 years.

Berkshire Hathaway provided $576 million in long-term financing to Lee at 9% per annum. Lee Enterprises used the funds to pay for the Berkshire properties and to refinance its roughly $400 million in existing debt. Much of this remains from the purchase of Pulitzer Inc. for $1.5 billion in 2005. Berkshire became Lee's sole lender after the deal closed on March 16, 2020.

"We had zero interest in selling the group to anyone else for one simple reason: We believe that Lee is best positioned to manage through the industry's challenges," Buffett said in a statement.

The acquisition was completed on March 16, 2020.

==== Attempted takeover ====
In January 2020, Alden Global Capital purchased a 5.9-percent stake in Lee Enterprises.

In November 2021, Alden offered to buy the rest of Lee for roughly $141 million.

To ward this off, the board of Lee Enterprises enacted a shareholder rights plan, colloquially known as a "poison pill", that forbade Alden to buy more than 10% of the company for one year. The rationale offered by the board was, "Consistent with its fiduciary duties, Lee's Board has taken this action to ensure our shareholders receive fair treatment, full transparency and protection in connection with Alden's unsolicited proposal to acquire Lee."

In early December, the board of Lee unanimously rejected the Alden bid, saying it "grossly undervalues Lee and fails to recognize the strength of our business today." Shortly thereafter, Alden Global, through its operating unit Strategic Investment Opportunities, filed a lawsuit in state court in Delaware against Lee Enterprises. The Alden lawsuit asserts that the members of the Lee board "have every reason to maintain the status quo and their lucrative corporate positions" and that they are "focused more on [their] own power than what's best for the company."

In mid-February 2022, the Delaware court found in favor of Lee Enterprises. Alden said it would file a proxy statement asking the company's shareholders to vote no on board members Mary Junck and Herbert Moloney during the March 2022 board elections. This attempt also failed; shareholders returned both directors to the Lee board.

In November 2021, the U.S. Department of Justice alleged two Iranian nationals had accessed the company's content management system in the fall of 2020, aiming to post false news about the presidential election.

==== 2022 layoffs ====
In May 2022, Lee Enterprises reportedly laid off roughly 400 staffers, roughly 10% of the workforce. The reduction was spread across about 19 of the chain's 75 newspapers and included roles in corporate headquarters.

Some of the layoffs included the editor of The Eagle in Bryan, Texas and the publisher of The Bismarck Tribune in Bismarck, North Dakota.

==== February 2025 cyberattack ====
In February 2025, a cyber attack prevented the company from laying out or publishing papers for several days. Before the week's end, editors could again publish papers and back-issues were being delivered.

After the attack, Lee Enterprises management warned employees to freeze their personal credit due to concerns that cyberattackers had accessed personal employee data. The warning was confirmed by an Independent Record sports reporter.

In June 2025, Nathan Bekke was appointed Chief Operating Officer. He started working for Lee in 1988 and had been with the company for more than three decades, holding a number of leadership positions.

==== 2025 David Hoffman takeover ====
On December 30, 2025, a team of investors led by David Hoffman invested a total of $50 million in Lee Enterprises in a deal that gave Hoffman majority ownership and made him chair of the board of directors. As of April 2025, Hoffman described himself as owning 21 newspapers. As of September 2026, Hoffman's name now appears on the nameplate of all Lee newspapers as 'majority shareholder'; the newspapers had run a required front page profile during the first week of July two months before.

== Newspapers ==
Lee Enterprises owns 72 daily newspapers and about 350 specialty publications in 26 states. The company's portfolio grew substantially, nearly doubling its audience size, with the acquisition of BH Media Group's publications in early 2020, including the Sioux Falls Argus Leader, Omaha World-Herald, Richmond (Virginia) Times-Dispatch and Tulsa World.

In January 2020, Lee Enterprises sold its newspaper and digital media operations in southern Oregon to Country Media, Inc. The sale included The World (Coos Bay), the Bandon Western World and The Umpqua Post. Lee had purchased the papers as part of its acquisition of Pulitzer, Inc. in 2005.

In March 2020, Lee sold the Santa Maria Times, The Lompoc Record, The Hanford Sentinel and the Santa Ynez Valley News, all in California, to Santa Maria News Media Inc., a newly-formed company led by a group of Canadian newspaper executives.

In January 2023, Lee Enterprises ceased publication of its Lebanon, Oregon Lebanon Express weekly newspaper and rolled coverage of the area into the Albany Democrat-Herald. In June 2023, Lee sold the Daily Journal and three other newspapers to Better Newspapers Inc. In September 2023, Lee sold the Arizona Daily Sun to Wick Communications. In October 2023, Lee sold The Southern Illinoisan to Paxton Media Group.

Other publications Lee has formerly owned include the North County Times, The Garden Island, The Provo Daily Herald, Daily Chronicle, Rhinelander Daily News, Shawano Leader, Napa Valley Register and The Ledger Independent of Maysville, KY

=== List of newspapers ===
State	City	Newspaper
Alabama	Dothan	Dothan Eagle
Alabama	Opelika	Opelika-Auburn News
Idaho	Twin Falls	Times-News
Illinois	Bloomington	The Pantagraph
Illinois	Decatur	Herald & Review
Illinois	Quad Cities	The Dispatch / The Rock Island Argus
Illinois	Mattoon & Charleston	Journal Gazette / Times-Courier
Indiana	Munster (Northwest Indiana)	The Times of Northwest Indiana
Iowa	Clarinda	Clarinda Herald-Journal
Iowa	Council Bluffs	The Daily Nonpareil
Iowa	Davenport	Quad-City Times
Iowa	Denison	Denison Bulletin & Review
Iowa	Mason City	Globe Gazette
Iowa	Muscatine	Muscatine Journal
Iowa	Shenandoah	The Valley News
Iowa	Sioux City	Sioux City Journal
Iowa	Waterloo	The Waterloo-Cedar Falls Courier
Iowa	Woodbine/Logan	Twiner-Herald
Missouri	St. Louis	St. Louis Post-Dispatch
Minnesota	Winona	Winona Daily News
Montana	Billings	Billings Gazette
Montana	Butte	The Montana Standard
Montana	Great Falls	Great Falls Tribune
Montana	Hamilton	Ravalli Republic
Montana	Helena	Independent Record
Montana	Missoula	Missoulian
Nebraska	Beatrice	Beatrice Daily Sun
Nebraska	Columbus	Columbus Telegram
Nebraska	Fremont	Fremont Tribune
Nebraska	Grand Island	The Grand Island Independent
Nebraska	Lincoln	Lincoln Journal Star
Nebraska	Kearney	Kearney Hub
Nebraska	Lexington	Lexington Clipper-Herald
Nebraska	North Platte	The North Platte Telegraph
Nebraska	Omaha	Omaha World-Herald
Nebraska	Scottsbluff	Star-Herald
Nebraska	Wahoo	Wahoo Newspaper
Nebraska	York	York News-Times
Nevada	Elko	Elko Daily Free Press
New Jersey	Atlantic City	The Press of Atlantic City
New York	Auburn	The Citizen
New York	Buffalo	The Buffalo News
New York	Glens Falls	The Post-Star
North Carolina	Concord	Independent Tribune
North Carolina	Greensboro	News & Record
North Carolina	Hickory	Hickory Daily Record
North Carolina	Marion	The McDowell News
North Carolina	Morganton	The News Herald
North Carolina	Mooresville	Mooresville Tribune
North Carolina	Statesville	Statesville Record & Landmark
North Carolina	Winston-Salem	Winston-Salem Journal
North Dakota	Bismarck	The Bismarck Tribune
Oklahoma	Tulsa	Tulsa World
Oregon	Albany	Albany Democrat-Herald
Oregon	Corvallis	Corvallis Gazette-Times
Pennsylvania	Carlisle	The Sentinel
South Carolina	Florence	The Morning News
South Carolina	Orangeburg	The Times and Democrat
South Dakota	Aberdeen	Aberdeen American News
South Dakota	Rapid City	Rapid City Journal
South Dakota	Sioux Falls	Argus Leader
South Dakota	Watertown	Watertown Public Opinion
Texas	Bryan-College Station	The Eagle
Texas	Waco	Waco Tribune-Herald
Virginia	Bristol	Bristol Herald Courier
Virginia	Charlottesville	The Daily Progress
Virginia	Culpeper	Culpeper Star-Exponent
Virginia	Danville	Danville Register & Bee
Virginia	Fredericksburg	The Free Lance–Star
Virginia	Lynchburg	The News & Advance
Virginia	Martinsville	Martinsville Bulletin
Virginia	Richmond	Richmond Times-Dispatch
Virginia	Roanoke	The Roanoke Times
Virginia	Rocky Mount	The Franklin News-Post
Virginia	Waynesboro	The News Virginian
Washington	Longview	The Daily News
Wisconsin	Chippewa Falls	The Chippewa Herald
Wisconsin	Kenosha	Kenosha News
Wisconsin	La Crosse	La Crosse Tribune
Wisconsin	Madison	Wisconsin State Journal
Wisconsin	Racine	Racine Journal Times
Wyoming	Casper	Casper Star-Tribune

== Formerly-owned stations ==
In May 2000, Lee Enterprises sold most of its remaining TV stations to Emmis Communications for $562.5 million. KMAZ was the last TV station to be sold in January 2001.

- Stations are arranged in alphabetical order by state and city of license.
- Two boldface asterisks appearing following a station's call letters (**) indicate a station built and signed on by Lee.

Stations owned by Lee Enterprises
Media market	State	Station	Purchased	Sold	Notes
Tucson	Arizona	KGUN-TV	1986	2000	
Durango	Colorado	KREZ-TV	1995	2000	
Honolulu	Hawaii	KGMB	1977	1980	
Honolulu	Hawaii	KGMB	1977	2000	(Note: Known as KGMB-TV prior to 1982.)
Mason City	Iowa	KGLO **	1937	1977	
Mason City	Iowa	KIMT **	1954	1980	(Note: Known as KGLO-TV prior to 1977.)
Moline	Illinois	WMDR **	1970	1975	
Quincy	Illinois	WTAD	1944	1986	
Quincy	Illinois	WQCY **	1948	1986	(Note: Known as WTAD-FM prior to 1974.)
Great Bend	Kansas	KSNC	1995	2000	
Topeka	Kansas	KSNT	1995	2000	
Wichita	Kansas	KSNW	1995	2000	
Mankato	Minnesota	KEYC-TV **	1960	1977	
Hannibal	Missouri	KHQA-TV **	1953	1986	
McCook	Nebraska	KSNK	1995	2000	
Omaha	Nebraska	KFAB	1976	1986	(Note: Co-owned with the Lincoln Journal Star; each held a 48.86% stake, the remaining 2.28% are held each by Lyell Bremser, Ken Headrick, and Walt Kavangh.)
Omaha	Nebraska	KGOR	1976	1986	
Omaha	Nebraska	KMTV-TV	1986	2000	
Albuquerque	New Mexico	KRQE	1985	2000	(Note: Known as KGGM-TV prior to 1992.) (Note: Co-owned with the New Mexico Broadcasting Co.; 42% owned by Lee, 58% owned by NMB until 1991.)
Las Cruces	New Mexico	KMAZ	1993	2001	(Note: Known as KZIA prior to 1997.)
Roswell	New Mexico	KBIM-TV	1989	2000	
Portland	Oregon	KOIN	1977	2000	
Huntington	West Virginia	WSAZ-TV	1971	2000	
