= Pulitzer, Inc. =

U.S. newspaper chain (1947–2005)

- Company type: Public
- Industry: Television, Newspapers
- Founded: 1947; 79 years ago
- Founder: Joseph Pulitzer
- Defunct: 2005
- Fate: Acquired by Lee Enterprises (television stations sold to Hearst-Argyle Television)
- Successor: Hearst-Argyle Television; Lee Enterprises
- Headquarters: St. Louis, Missouri, United States
- Area served: United States (nationwide)
- Key people: David J. Barrett (president/COO)
- Products: Television, Newspapers
- Revenue: ▲US$785.4 million (2006)
- Operating income: ▲US$228.8 million (2006)
- Net income: ▲US$98.7 million (2006)
- Number of employees: approx. 3000 (full time)

Pulitzer, Inc. was an American media company who owned newspapers, television stations and radio stations across the United States. Founded by Joseph Pulitzer (who also funded the Pulitzer Prizes, which are not affiliated with the company), its papers included the St. Louis Post-Dispatch, the Arizona Daily Star (Tucson), and Chicago's Daily Southtown and Lerner Newspapers chain.

== Ownership ==
Pulitzer Inc., which published 14 daily newspapers at the time, was sold to Lee Enterprises for $1.5 billion in 2005 (with both Gannett and the E. W. Scripps Company expressing interest in buying the company prior to Lee's acquisition). Pulitzer had previously acquired Scripps League's 16 daily and 30 non-daily publications in 1996.

In May 1998, Pulitzer sold its broadcast group, including nine television stations and five radio stations, to Hearst-Argyle. The acquisition was completed in March 1999.

=== Television stations owned (until 1999) ===
- Stations are arranged in alphabetical order by state and city of license.
- Two boldface asterisks appearing following a station's call letters (**) indicate a station built and signed on by Pulitzer, Inc.

Stations owned by Pulitzer, Inc.
Media market	State	Station	Purchased	Sold
Tucson	Arizona	KVOA	1968	1972
Orlando–Daytona Beach–Melbourne	Florida	WESH	1993	1999
Fort Wayne	Indiana	WPTA	1983	1989
Des Moines–Ames	Iowa	KCCI	1993	1999
Louisville	Kentucky	WLKY	1983	1999
New Orleans	Louisiana	WDSU	1989	1999
St. Louis	Missouri	KSD-TV/KSDK**	1947	1983
Omaha	Nebraska	KETV	1976	1999
Albuquerque–Santa Fe	New Mexico	KOAT-TV	1969	1999
Winston-Salem–Greensboro–High Point	North Carolina	WXII-TV	1983	1999
Harrisburg–Lancaster–York	Pennsylvania	WGAL	1979	1999
Providence	Rhode Island	WTEV-TV/WLNE-TV	1979	1983
Greenville–Spartanburg	South Carolina	WFBC-TV/WYFF	1983	1999
