= Mass media in Wichita, Kansas =

Wichita is a major center of media in Kansas. The following is a list of media outlets based in the city.

== Print ==
=== Magazines ===
- Splurge!, monthly, local fashion and lifestyle
- Teenview Magazine, monthly magazine created for teens by teens from a teens point of view.

=== Newspapers ===
The Wichita Eagle is the city's primary newspaper, published daily. Other newspapers published in the city include:

- The Active Age, monthly, seniors' lifestyle
- Catholic Advance, twice monthly, published by the Roman Catholic Diocese of Wichita
- The Community Voice, bi-weekly, local African American news
- Liberty Press, monthly, gay and lesbian lifestyle
- The PlainDealer, monthly, labor news
- The Sunflower, three days a week, Wichita State University student newspaper
- The White Buffalo Gazette, monthly, American Indian news
- The Wichita Business Journal, weekly

== Radio ==
Wichita, Kansas is the 98th largest radio market in the country as ranked by Arbitron. The following is a list of radio stations licensed to and/or broadcasting in the Wichita market.

=== AM ===
- 900 KSGL Wichita (Adult standards)
- 950 KJRG Newton (Bott Radio Network)
- 1070 KFKB Wichita (Classic country)
- 1240 KFH Wichita (Sports)
- 1330 KNSS Wichita (Talk radio)
- 1360 KPHN El Dorado (Catholic/EWTN Radio)
- 1410 KGSO Wichita (Sports)
- 1480 KQAM Wichita (Talk radio)

=== FM ===
- 88.3 KYFW Wichita (Bible Broadcasting Network)
- 89.1 KMUW Wichita (Public radio/NPR)
- 90.7 KYWA Wichita (WayFM Network)
- 91.1 KCFN Wichita (American Family Radio)
- 92.3 KKGQ Newton (Sports)
- 92.7 KWME Wellington (Classic hits)
- 93.1 KHMY-FM Pratt (Hot adult contemporary)
- 93.5 KDGS Andover (Rhythmic contemporary)
- 93.9 KGSO Wichita (Sports)
- 95.1 KICT-FM Wichita (Rock)
- 96.3 KZCH Derby (Contemporary hit radio)
- 97.1 KBOB-FM Haven (Adult hits/Bob FM)
- 97.5 KFH-FM Wichita (Sports)
- 97.9 KRBB Wichita (Adult contemporary)
- 98.7 KNSS-FM Clearwater (Talk radio)
- 99.1 KTLI El Dorado (K-Love)
- 99.7 KGHF Belle Plaine (Classic country)
- 100.5 KVWF Augusta (Country)
- 100.9 KAXZ-LP Wichita
- 101.3 KFDI-FM Wichita (Country)
- 101.7 KIHB-LP Wichita (3ABN Radio)
- 102.1 KZSN Hutchinson (Country)
- 103.7 KEYN-FM Wichita (Classic hits)
- 104.5 KFXJ Augusta (Classic rock)
- 104.9 KYOM-LP Wichita (Community/urban contemporary)
- 105.3 KFBZ Haysville (Hot adult contemporary)
- 106.5 KYQQ Arkansas City (Regional Mexican)
- 107.3 KTHR Wichita (Alternative rock)
- 107.9 KWLS Winfield (Country)

== Television ==
Wichita is the principal city of the Wichita-Hutchinson, Kansas television market which consists of the western two-thirds of the state. According to Nielsen, it is the 67th largest market in the country. Cable television service for Wichita and the surrounding area is provided by Cox Communications and AT&T.

The following is a list of television stations that broadcast from and/or are licensed to the city.

=== Full-power ===
- 3 KSNW Wichita (NBC)
- 8 KPTS Hutchinson (PBS)
- 10 KAKE Wichita (ABC)
- 12 KWCH-DT Hutchinson (CBS)
- 24 KSAS-TV Wichita (Fox, Independent with MyNetworkTV on 24.2)
- 31 KDCU-DT Derby (Univision)
- 33 KSCW-DT Wichita (The CW)
- 36 KMTW Hutchinson (Roar)

=== Low-power ===
- 5 KCTU-LD Wichita
- 15 K15DD-D Wichita (HSN)
- 26 KAGW-CD Wichita
- 28 KWKD-LD Wichita (Daystar)
- 30 K30RF-D Wichita
- 34 KFVT-LD Wichita
