= Mass media in Garden City, Kansas =

Garden City, Kansas is a center of media in southwestern Kansas. The following is a list of media outlets based in the city.

== Print ==
The Garden City Telegram is the city's daily newspaper with a circulation of nearly 8,000.

== Radio ==
The following radio stations are licensed to and/or broadcast from Garden City:

=== AM ===
Frequency	Callsign	Format	City of License	Notes
1030	KBUF	News/Talk	Holcomb, Kansas	Broadcasts from Garden City
1240	KIUL	News/Talk	Garden City, Kansas	-
1340	KGGS	Adult contemporary	Garden City, Kansas	Simulcast via translator on 102.9 FM

=== FM ===
Frequency	Callsign	Format	City of License	Notes
88.1	KZGC-FM	Religious	Garden City, Kansas	-
91.1	KANZ	Public	Garden City, Kansas	NPR
97.3	KKJQ	Country	Garden City, Kansas	-
98.1	KSKZ	Hot Adult Contemporary	Copeland, Kansas	Broadcasts from Garden City
99.9	KWKR	Classic rock	Leoti, Kansas	Broadcasts from Garden City
101.7	KFBZ-LP	80's	Garden City, Kansas	Garden City High School student-operated station.
105.9	KSSA	Regional Mexican	Ingalls, Kansas	Broadcasts from Garden City
107.9	K300BC	Religious	Garden City, Kansas	Satellite of KCCV-FM, Overland Park, Kansas

== Television ==
Garden City is in the Wichita-Hutchinson, Kansas television market. The following television stations are licensed to and/or broadcast from Garden City:

Display Channel	Network	Callsign	City of License	Notes
11.1	NBC	KSNG	Garden City, Kansas	Satellite station of KSNW, Wichita, Kansas
11.2	Telemundo	KSNG	Garden City, Kansas	Satellite station of KSNW, Wichita, Kansas
13.1	ABC	KUPK	Garden City, Kansas	Satellite station of KAKE, Wichita, Kansas
13.2	Me-TV	KUPK	Garden City, Kansas	Satellite station of KAKE, Wichita, Kansas
17.1	Fox	KAAS-LP	Garden City, Kansas	Translator of KSAS-TV, Wichita, Kansas
17.2	TBD	KAAS-LP	Garden City, Kansas	Translator of KSAS-TV, Wichita, Kansas
17.3	Comet	KAAS-LP	Garden City, Kansas	Translator of KSAS-TV, Wichita, Kansas
23.1	Retro TV	KGCE-LD	Garden City, Kansas	Translator of KDGL-LD, Sublette, Kansas
23.2	Tuff TV	KGCE-LD	Garden City, Kansas	Translator of KDGL-LD, Sublette, Kansas
23.3	AMGTV	KGCE-LD	Garden City, Kansas	Translator of KDGL-LD, Sublette, Kansas
23.4	Launch TV	KGCE-LD	Garden City, Kansas	Translator of KDGL-LD, Sublette, Kansas
23.5	TheWalk TV	KGCE-LD	Garden City, Kansas	Translator of KDGL-LD, Sublette, Kansas
23.6	PBJ	KGCE-LD	Garden City, Kansas	Translator of KDGL-LD, Sublette, Kansas
