= KGBL =

- Lakin, Kansas; United States
- Broadcast area: Garden City, Kansas; Scott City, Kansas; Deerfield, Kansas
- Frequency: 100.9 MHz
- Branding: 94.7 • 100.9 The Bull KGBL

Programming
- Format: Country

Ownership
- Owner: Steckline Communications, Inc.
- Sister stations: KGGS, KGSO, KGYN, KIUL, KQAM, KYUL

History
- Former call signs: KGRQ (2009–2014)
- Call sign meaning: BL = "Bull"

Technical information
- Licensing authority: FCC
- Facility ID: 170960
- Class: C1
- ERP: 100,000 watts
- HAAT: 121 metres (397 ft)
- Transmitter coordinates: 37°59′52″N 100°54′25″W
- Translators: K234CG (94.7 MHz, Dodge City)

Links
- Public license information: Public file; LMS
- Webcast: Listen Live
- Website: Official Website

KGBL (100.9 FM) is a radio station licensed to serve the community of Lakin, Kansas. The station is owned by Steckline Communications, Inc., and airs a country music format.

The station was assigned the call sign KGRQ by the Federal Communications Commission on September 23, 2009. The station changed its call sign to KGBL on March 1, 2014.
