= KGGS =

- Garden City, Kansas; United States
- Frequency: 1340 kHz
- Branding: La Raza 102.9 FM/1340 AM

Programming
- Format: Regional Mexican

Ownership
- Owner: Steckline Communications, Inc.
- Sister stations: KGBL, KGSO, KGYN, KIUL, KQAM, KYUL

History
- First air date: 2012

Technical information
- Licensing authority: FCC
- Facility ID: 160947
- Class: C
- Power: 880 watts day 1,000 watts night
- Transmitter coordinates: 37°58′8″N 100°55′56″W
- Translator: 102.9 K275CT (Garden City)

Links
- Public license information: Public file; LMS
- Webcast: Listen live
- Website: KGGS Online

KGGS (1340 AM) was a radio station licensed to serve the community of Garden City, Kansas. The station is owned by Steckline Communications, Inc., and aired a Regional Mexican format.

The station was assigned the KGGS call letters by the Federal Communications Commission on July 2, 2009.

As of July 2025, the station was no longer broadcasting.
