= KNSS =

KNSS may refer to:

- KNSS (AM), a radio station (1330 AM) licensed to Wichita, Kansas, United States
- KNSS-FM, a radio station (98.7 FM) licensed to Clearwater, Kansas, United States
- KFH (AM), a radio station (1240 AM) licensed to Wichita, Kansas, United States, which held the KNSS call sign from 1987 until 2004
- KBUL-FM, a radio station (98.1 FM) licensed to Carson City, Nevada, United States, which held the KNSS call sign from 1984 until 1987
- Confederation of New Trade Unions of Slovenia "Independence", known in Slovene as Konfederacija novih sindikatov Slovenije - Neodvisnost
