= KPHN =

- El Dorado, Kansas; United States
- Broadcast area: Wichita metropolitan area
- Frequency: 1360 kHz

Programming
- Format: Catholic radio
- Network: Catholic Radio Network

Ownership
- Owner: Catholic Radio Network; (Kansas City Catholic Network, Inc.)

History
- First air date: November 16, 1953
- Former call signs: KBTO (1953–1971); KOYY (1971–1984); KSPG (1984–1992); KSRX (1992–2002); KAHS (2002–2014)
- Call sign meaning: Previous call letters of 1340 AM Pittsburg and 1190 AM Kansas City, retained to represent Emil Kapaun

Technical information
- Licensing authority: FCC
- Facility ID: 48538
- Class: B
- Power: 1,000 watts (day); 240 watts (night)
- Transmitter coordinates: 37°48′54″N 96°48′52″W
- Translator: K244FL (96.7 FM) Wichita

Links
- Public license information: Public file; LMS
- Website: catholicradionetwork.com

KPHN (1360 AM) is a religious-formatted broadcast radio station licensed to El Dorado, Kansas, serving the Wichita metropolitan area. The station is owned by the Catholic Radio Network, Inc.; the KPHN broadcast license is held by Kansas City Catholic Network, Inc.

== History ==
=== Early years ===
O. A. Tedrick received the construction permit for a new 500-watt, daytime-only radio station in El Dorado on April 1, 1953. The station signed on seven months later on November 16, 1953, from studios and a transmitter east of the city limits on US 54. Two years after launching, Tedrick transferred the station to the El Dorado Broadcasting Company, which featured additional investors, including other members of the Tedrick family.

After the June 10, 1958, tornado in which 13 people died, KBTO became the center of storm warning operations in the event of severe weather, activating a network of ham radio operators and spotters throughout the area. The station also attracted attention during the trial of Francis Gary Powers when it provided its listeners not only with international reports of the case but also with what Radio Moscow was saying on air, transcribed and recorded for 11 to 12 hours a day and summarized in a 25-minute evening program.

The early 1970s were a period of major changes for the station. A 1970 storm ripped the roof off of its transmitter building. The next year, it was sold to the Neosho County Broadcasting Company, owner of KKOY in Chanute, and the call letters were changed to KOYY on November 29. Neosho had other plans, too: that same month, the company was granted an FM station to broadcast on 99.3 MHz. Three months later, on February 15, 1972, KOYY-FM signed on the air with a 60 percent simulcast of the AM, carrying middle of the road music.

KOYY-AM-FM was sold in 1977 to Michael Horne and Guy Russell, owners of station KIKZ at Seminole, Texas, for $320,000. The Horne family sold its interest to Russell three years later. The call letters on both AM and FM outlets changed to KSPG-AM-FM in 1984, with the stations airing country music. This ended a brief period of fully split programming on the frequencies.

=== Sales in the 1980s and 1990s ===
The late 1980s and early 1990s would see a series of changing hands for KSPG and KSPG-FM, with the stations eventually being split from each other. The first transaction took place in 1987, when Gary Violet bought the pair from Russell for $425,000. Two years later, an agreement was reached to sell the pair for $1.1 million to Richard Smith of Columbus, Georgia. The deal, however, collapsed. In the meantime, Violet upgraded KSPG-FM, changing its frequency to 99.1 MHz at higher power and its format to urban contemporary; the AM also began broadcasting at night with 40 watts.

A second buyer appeared in 1991: New Life Fellowship Inc. of Wichita, paying $1.05 million for both stations. New Life, headed by David and Tammie Brace, was in the middle of a series of radio deals that would establish itself with a presence in the market. It already owned contemporary Christian KZZD (90.7 FM), which it had started in 1989, and in 1991, it won a bid to purchase KSOF (91.1 FM), then a classical music station owned by Friends University. New Life had quickly grown a radio empire, and while the El Dorado FM, rechristened KTLI, took on new importance as its lone commercially operated station, the AM was increasingly out of place. By 1993, KSPG AM, renamed KSRX, was being leased to a company which ran it as an El Dorado-based station with country music and local news.

On March 15, 1994, local programming on KSRX ceased when operator Lee White, after two years, said he could not continue for economic reasons. As a result of this event, Randy and Judi Hughes led a group of local businesses that leased the station from New Life Fellowship with a view to purchasing it, returning the frequency to air in the fall with much the same full-service country format it had been airing. However, by 1996, no purchase had ever been consummated, and Faith Metro Church was in receivership after accumulating more than $10 million in debt and with David Brace awaiting sentencing on four federal convictions of money laundering. That year, KSRX changed hands twice, being sold to Michael Glinter (owner of WREN, then in Topeka) in April and to Elijah Communications in July. Elijah kept the station for two years before Reunion Broadcasting acquired it in 1998. Under both Elijah and Reunion, the station aired religious programming.

In 2001, Reunion attempted to sell KSRX to T&T Communications for $375,000, a transaction that failed to be consummated. In the months leading up to the sale attempt, the station had shifted to a secular news and sports talk format, including local high school and college basketball games.

=== Return to God ===
Another faith-based organization took control of the station—which had renamed itself KAHS in 2002—when owner Reunion Broadcasting sold KAHS to the Kansas City Catholic Network, owner of the Catholic Radio Network, for $525,000; by this time, KAHS had switched to adult standards programming. The call letters were switched from KAHS to KPHN in 2014, after Kansas City Catholic Network acquired the previous station to use them and renamed it KDMR. While the KPHN designation had originally been established on 1340 AM in Pittsburg, it now phonetically represents Emil Kapaun, a chaplain from Pilsen who died in a prisoner of war camp in the Korean War and who has a sainthood cause before the Vatican.

In 2017, KPHN suffered a burglary in which thieves forced their way into the studio-transmitter site and stole all of the station's studio equipment.
