= KFH =

KFH may refer to:

- KFH (AM), a radio station (1240 AM) licensed to Wichita, Kansas, United States
- Kingdom Filipina Hacienda, an organization based in the Philippines
- Kuwait Finance House
- KNSS-FM, a radio station (98.7 FM) licensed to Clearwater, Kansas, United States that held the KFH-FM call sign from 2002 until 2016
- KNSS (AM), a radio station (1330 AM) licensed to Wichita, Kansas, United States that held the KFH call sign from 1922 until 2004
