= KSOF =

KSOF may refer to:

- KSOF (FM), a radio station (98.9 FM) licensed to Dinuba, California, United States
- KCFN, a radio station (91.1 FM) licensed to Wichita, Kansas, United States, which held the call sign KSOF from May 1982 to July 1993
- KCLH, a radio station (94.7 FM) licensed to Caledonia, Minnesota, United States, which held the call sign KSOF from August 1994 to April 1997
