= Demographics of Wichita, Kansas =

Demographics of region

Wichita is the largest city in the US state of Kansas and the principal city of the Wichita Metropolitan Area. As of the 2010 United States census, the population of the city was 382,368.

== History ==
Historical population
Census	Pop.	Note	%±
1870	689		—
1880	4,911		612.8%
1890	23,853		385.7%
1900	24,671		3.4%
1910	52,450		112.6%
1920	72,217		37.7%
1930	111,110		53.9%
1940	114,966		3.5%
1950	168,279		46.4%
1960	254,698		51.4%
1970	276,554		8.6%
1980	279,272		1.0%
1990	304,011		8.9%
2000	344,284		13.2%
2010	382,368		11.1%
2020	397,532		4.0%
U.S. Decennial Census; 2010–2020

The early 20th century saw a resurgence in growth from the nascent aircraft industry (see below) with the population increasing by 350% between 1900 and 1930. By 1920 Wichita had entered the top 100 largest cities in the United States and by 1930 reached 77th in rank. The depression of the 1930s again slowed growth, with total population only increasing by 3% between 1930 and 1940. The decades during and after World War II saw a growth spurt as the city's population increased by more than 120% between 1940 and 1960. Wichita was the 59th largest city in the country by 1960.

The period between 1950 and 1970 saw a major shift in the city's racial make-up, as the proportion of blacks in the population increased significantly. Until 1950, blacks had made up about 5% of the population, with little variation. The black population increased from 8,082 (4.8%) in 1950 to 26,841 (9.7%) in 1970. During the 1970s, the city's population grew by only 1%, but the growth rate accelerated in the following two decades to more than 13% in the 1990s. The growth among minorities is still strong.

In terms of population, Wichita is the largest city in Kansas and the 51st most populous city in the United States.

== 2020 census ==
The 2020 United States census counted 397,532 people, 154,683 households, and 92,969 families in Wichita. The population density was 2,454.1 per square mile (947.5/km^{2}). There were 172,801 housing units at an average density of 1,066.7 per square mile (411.9/km^{2}).

The racial makeup (including Hispanics in the racial counts) was 63.39% (251,997) white, 10.95% (43,537) black or African-American, 1.33% (5,296) Native American, 5.09% (20,225) Asian, 0.12% (482) Pacific Islander, 7.41% (29,444) from other races, and 11.71% (46,551) from two or more races.

The racial and ethnic makeup (where Hispanics are excluded from the racial counts and placed in their own category) was 58.79% (233,703) White (non-Hispanic), 10.62% (42,228) Black (non-Hispanic), 0.86% (3,400) Native American (non-Hispanic), 5.03% (19,991) Asian (non-Hispanic), 0.11% (429) Pacific Islander (non-Hispanic), 0.40% (1,585) from other race (non-Hispanic), 5.89% (23,410) from two or more races, and 18.31% (72,786) Hispanic or Latino.

Of the 154,683 households, 26.6% had children under the age of 18; 42.6% were married couples living together; 29.4% had a female householder with no husband present. 33.2% of households consisted of individuals and 11.9% had someone living alone who was 65 years of age or older. The average household size was 2.5 and the average family size was 3.2.

24.6% of the population was under the age of 18, 9.5% from 18 to 24, 26.7% from 25 to 44, 23.2% from 45 to 64, and 14.3% who were 65 years of age or older. The median age was 35.3 years. For every 100 females, the population had 97.5 males. For every 100 females ages 18 and older, there were 95.7 males.

The 2016–2020 5-year American Community Survey estimates show that the median household income was $53,466 (with a margin of error of +/- $1,028) and the median family income $69,930 (+/- $1,450). Males had a median income of $38,758 (+/- $1,242) versus $26,470 (+/- $608) for females. The median income for those above 16 years old was $31,875 (+/- $408). Approximately, 10.9% of families and 15.5% of the population were below the poverty line, including 21.4% of those under the age of 18 and 8.7% of those ages 65 or over.

== 2010 census data ==
As of the 2010 census, there were 382,368 people, 151,818 households, and 94,862 families residing in the city. The population density was 2,304.8 inhabitants per square mile (889.9/km^{2}). There were 167,310 housing units at an average density of 1,022.1 per square mile (394.6/km^{2}).

=== Age ===
The median age in the city was 33.9 years. 26.6% of residents were under the age of 18; 10.1% were between the ages of 18 and 24; 26.9% were from 25 to 44; 24.9% were from 45 to 64; and 11.5% were 65 years of age or older.

=== Gender and household ===
The gender composition of the city was 49.3% male and 50.7% female. Of the 151,818 households, 33.4% had children under the age of 18 living with them, 44.1% were married couples living together, 5.2% had a male householder with no wife present, 13.1% had a female householder with no husband present, and 37.5% were non-families. 31.1% of all households were made up of individuals, and 9.1% had someone living alone who was 65 years of age or older. The average household size was 2.48, and the average family size was 3.14.

=== Income ===
The median income for a household in the city was $44,477, and the median income for a family was $57,088. Males had a median income of $42,783 versus $32,155 for females. The per capita income for the city was $24,517. About 12.1% of families and 15.8% of the population were below the poverty line, including 22.5% of those under age 18 and 9.9% of those age 65 or over.

=== Race and ancestry ===
Per the 2010 U.S. census, the racial composition of the city was 71.9% White, 11.5% African American, 4.8% Asian, 1.2% American Indian, 0.1% Pacific Islander, 6.2% from other races, and 4.3% from two or more races. Hispanics and Latinos of any race were 10.5% of the population.

The breakdown by ancestry of the Hispanic and Latino population (10.5% of the total) was:

- 8.3% Mexican
- 0.4% Puerto Rican
- 0.1% Cuban
- 1.7% other Hispanic or Latino

The breakdown by ancestry of the Asian population (4.8% of the total) was:

- 2.4% Vietnamese
- 0.5% Laotian
- 0.4% Chinese
- 0.3% Filipino
- 0.3% Indian
- 0.1% Korean
- 0.1% Pakistani
- 1.1% other Asian

== Metropolitan area ==
Wichita is the principal city of both the Wichita Metropolitan Statistical Area (MSA) and the Wichita-Winfield Combined Statistical Area (CSA). The Wichita MSA encompasses Sedgwick, Butler, Harvey, and Sumner counties and, as of 2010, had an estimated population of 623,061, making it the 84th largest MSA in the United States. The larger Wichita-Winfield CSA also includes Cowley County and, as of 2010, had an estimated population of 659,372. Nearby Reno County is not a part of the Wichita MSA or Wichita-Winfield CSA, but, were it included, it would add an additional population of 64,511 as of 2010.
