= Šinkovec =

Šinkovec (Slovene pronunciation: [ˈʃìːŋkɔʋəts]) is a Slovenian surname that may refer to the following notable people:

- Jure Šinkovec (born 1985), Slovenian ski jumper
- Matjaž Šinkovec (born 1951), Slovenian diplomat, politician, translator and journalist
