= KANR =

KANR may refer to:

- KANR (FM), a radio station (91.9 FM) licensed to serve Santa Rosa, New Mexico, United States
- KGHF (FM), a radio station (99.7 FM) licensed to serve Belle Plaine, Kansas, United States, which held the call sign KANR from 1994 to 2013
