= KYWA =

Christian radio station in Wichita, Georgia

- Wichita, Kansas; United States
- Broadcast area: Wichita metropolitan area
- Frequency: 90.7 MHz
- Branding: 90.7 WayFM

Programming
- Language: English
- Format: Contemporary Christian music
- Network: WayFM Network

Ownership
- Owner: WayFM Network; (Hope Media Group)

History
- First air date: March 1989
- Former call signs: KGAM (1988–1991); KZZD (1991–1992, 1996–2004); KIBN (1992–1996)
- Call sign meaning: WayFM

Technical information
- Licensing authority: FCC
- Facility ID: 48537
- Class: C1
- ERP: 53,000 watts
- HAAT: 144 meters (472 ft)
- Transmitter coordinates: 37°28′37″N 97°04′29″W

Links
- Public license information: Public file; LMS
- Website: wayfm.com/listen?market=wichita

KYWA (90.7 FM) is a non-commercial radio station in Wichita, Kansas. The station broadcasts a Christian contemporary format from the WayFM network.

The station went on the air in March 1989 as KGAM. It was one of eventually five stations owned by the New Life Fellowship Church and cycled through formats, including Christian music (as KGAM and KZZD), gospel (as KIBN), and a brokered Spanish-language format. An attempt to sell the station to the producer of the Spanish-language programming failed in July 1995, weeks after New Life's pastor was arrested on money laundering charges. The church was forced into bankruptcy and sold to Word of Life Ministries; the KZZD call letters returned, along with a Christian rock format. The station was sold to WayFM in 2004 and integrated into its network.

== History ==
The station signed on in 1989 as KGAM (Kingdom Gospel According to Music) under the ownership of the New Life Fellowship Church; its signal could only be heard within the Wichita city limits and as far as Winfield. The station aired primarily music—contemporary Christian music during the day, Christian rock in evening hours, and Christian metal late at night. It also featured mid-morning talk and teaching programs and a call-in talk show in the evening.

In February 1991, the call letters were changed to KZZD, branded "Z-91". In April 1992, as part of the sale of KSOF 91.1 to the New Life Fellowship Church, the KZZD call letters and format were transferred to that frequency; the 90.7 facility was relaunched as KIBN, the Inspirational Black Network, which broadcast gospel music and inspirational programming aimed at Black Christian listeners. KIBN was shut down in 1994 because donations failed to cover its operating costs; after protests, the church put it back on the air while working to sell it to a coalition of Black investors, which fell through.

In October 1994, KIBN was leased to La Mexicana, a non-profit organization which programmed the station with a Spanish-language music format serving Wichita's Hispanic community. Although there was a contract for La Mexicana to buy the station from New Life Fellowship, it was denied as the owner of La Mexicana, Tony Delgado, was not a citizen of the United States; as a result, KIBN went off the air in July 1995. The month before, the owner of the New Life Fellowship, working as Faith Metro Church, was arrested due to money-laundering charges. Delgado claimed he had paid pastor David Brace $150,000, money its officials could not locate. In August, New Life Fellowship and its five stations were forced into bankruptcy.

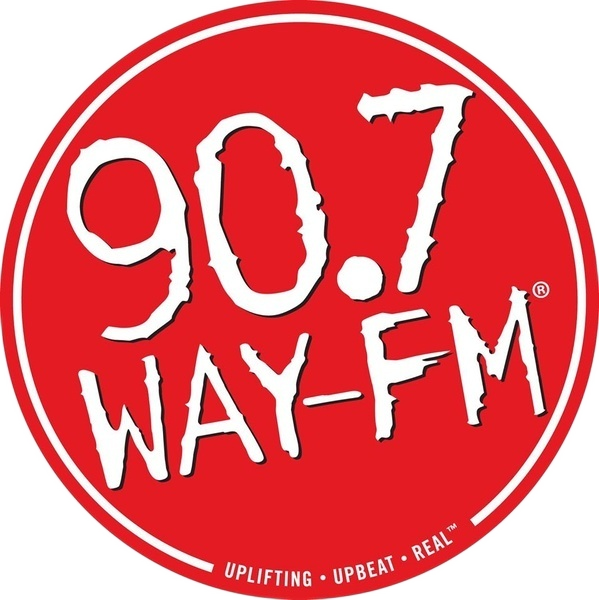
Former logo

The bankruptcy trustee for New Life Fellowship sold the station to Word of Life Ministries for $130,000 in 1997. By this point, it had reverted to its former KZZD call sign. It resumed airing Christian programming and was known as Z-91. On June 17, 2004, the station dropped its Christian rock format and became an affiliate of the WayFM network, after being sold to the WayFM group. The station changed its call letters to KYWA to reflect the change on the same day.

== See also ==
- KTLI
