= KQAM =

Coordinates: 37°44′21″N 97°16′15.2″W

- Wichita, Kansas; United States
- Broadcast area: South Central Kansas
- Frequency: 1480 kHz
- Branding: The Big Talker

Programming
- Format: Talk radio
- Affiliations: Townhall; Compass Media Networks; Salem Radio Network; Westwood One; Motor Racing Network; Performance Racing Network

Ownership
- Owner: Steckline Communications, Inc.
- Sister stations: KGHF, KGSO

History
- First air date: 1936; 90 years ago
- Former call signs: KANS (1936–1980); KWKN (1980–1982); KLEO (1982–1990); KZSN (1990–1997)

Technical information
- Licensing authority: FCC
- Facility ID: 61362
- Class: B
- Power: 5,000 watts day; 1,000 watts night
- Repeater: 99.7 KGHF-HD4 (Belle Plaine)

Links
- Public license information: Public file; LMS
- Website: KQAM Online

KQAM (1480 AM) is a commercial station in Wichita, Kansas. It carries a talk radio format and is owned by Steckline Communications, along with sports radio KGSO and classic country KGHF. The studios and offices are on South Maize Road in Wichita.

By day, KQAM is powered at 5,000 watts; to protect other stations on 1480 AM, it reduces power to 1,000 watts at night. It uses a directional antenna at all times with a four-tower array. The transmitter is off East 29th Street North in Wichita, near Chisholm Creek.

== Programming ==
Weekdays on KQAM begin with a news, farm reports and information show, "The Morning News with John Wright." The rest of the weekday line up includes nationally syndicated conservative talk show hosts, including: Brian Kilmeade, Dan Bongino, Todd Starnes, Andy Hooser, Joe Pags, Jim Bohannon, America in the Morning with John Trout and First Light with Michael Toscano. Starting at 4 p.m., Andy Hooser hosts “The Voice of Reason,” a conservative talk show directed at millennials. Hooser has extended his show to national networks due to his success.

Weekends feature shows on home repair, technology, movies, beer, cigars and farm news. Weekend syndicated hosts include Larry Elder, Leo Laporte, Mark Moss, Kim Komando. World and national news is provided by Townhall.

== History ==
On October 7, 1936, the station signed on the air as KANS, representing the word Kansas. In the 1960s and 1970s, it was owned by Swanco Broadcasting. Its call sign was KLEO, and for many years, was a popular Top 40 station. On September 2, 1980, KLEO flipped to adult contemporary as KWKN. On March 8, 1982, KWKN flipped to a simulcast of its then-FM sister station KGCS-FM, which aired a country format. On October 21, 1982, after being purchased by Jack Sampson, owner of Hutchinson radio station KSKU, the KLEO call letters returned, as well as the adult contemporary format. The station flipped to MOR/adult standards on September 24, 1984. On October 5, 1989, KLEO flipped to traditional country as KZSN, complementing sister station KZSN-FM's contemporary country format. KZSN would eventually give way to a simulcast with the FM station; this lasted until September 25, 1997, when it assumed KQAM's call letters and flipped to sports talk.

In 2002, the station was sold to The Walt Disney Company from Entercom for $2 million. With the sale, KQAM became Wichita's Radio Disney network affiliate on July 23, 2002.

On November 12, 2009, Disney/ABC announced that they would sell KQAM to Steckline Communications. According to Greg Steckline, the owner of the company, he wasn't aiming to purchase but "this one just kind of happened. We just happened to be in the right place at the right time." Steckline paid $350,000 for KQAM. On January 6, 2010, KQAM dropped Radio Disney, unveiling the lineup for its talk format as a companion to its sister station, sports radio KGSO.

Steckline Communications also owns KIUL (Garden City, Kansas), KYUL (Scott City, Kansas), and KGYN (Guymon, Oklahoma).

Former logo

KQAM began simulcasting on translator K273CX (102.5 FM) in October 2016. The simulcast would be dropped in May 2022, when the translator began simulcasting recently acquired sister station KHLT-FM's HD2 sub-channel.
