= KGHF =

KGHF may refer to:

- KGHF (FM), a radio station (99.7 FM) licensed to serve Belle Plaine, Kansas, United States
- KUBE (AM), a radio station (1350 AM) licensed to serve Pueblo, Colorado, United States, which held the call sign KGHF from 1928 to 1964 and from 1989 to 2008
