= Global village (disambiguation) =

"Global village" is the metaphoric village formed through the use of electronic media.

Global Village may also refer to:

== Places ==
- Global Village (Dubai), cultural, entertainment and shopping destination located at Dubailand, Dubai
- Global Village Tech Park, a software technology park in Bengaluru, India

== Arts and entertainment ==
- Global Village (American radio show), an American radio show
- Global Village (Canadian radio show), a Canadian radio show
- Global Village (TV series), an Australian television show

== Telecommunications ==
- Global Village Communication, a manufacturer of consumer modems, now a division of Zoom Technologies
- Global Village Telecom, a Brazilian telecommunications company

== Other uses ==
- Global Village, an international educational youth festival organised by Woodcraft Folk

== See also ==
- World village (disambiguation)
