= Chris Foley =

Chris Foley may refer to:

- Chris Foley (politician) (born 1956), independent member of the Queensland Legislative Assembly
- Chris Foley (musician), drummer for Boston hardcore bands SSD and DYS
- Kidd Chris (Chris Foley, born 1974), radio show host
