= KDGS =

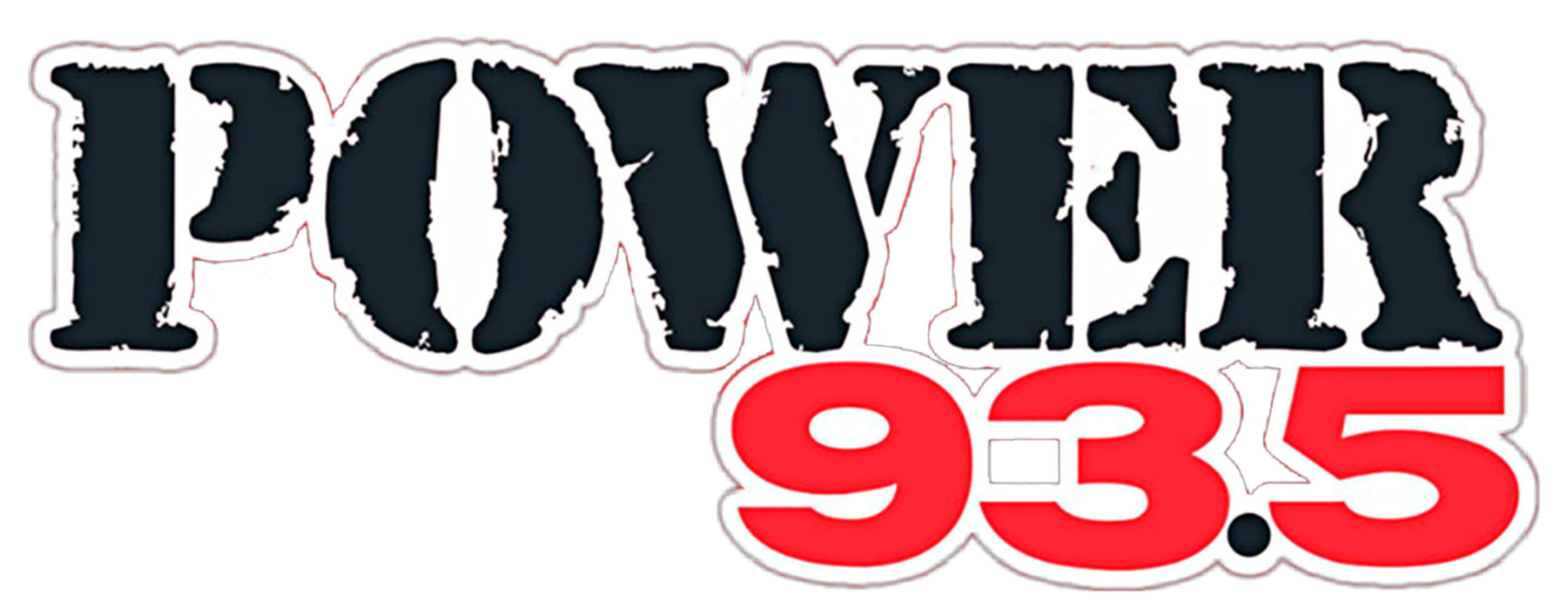
- Andover, Kansas; United States
- Broadcast area: Wichita metropolitan area
- Frequency: 93.5 MHz (HD Radio)
- Branding: Power 93.5

Programming
- Language: English
- Format: Urban Contemporary
- Affiliations: Compass Media Networks

Ownership
- Owner: Audacy, Inc.; (Audacy License, LLC)
- Sister stations: KEYN-FM; KFBZ; KFH; KNSS; KNSS-FM

History
- First air date: October 28, 1993
- Former call signs: KOAS (1993); KDLE (1993–95)
- Former frequencies: 93.9 MHz (1993–2014)
- Call sign meaning: "Dogs" (former moniker briefly used in 1995)

Technical information
- Licensing authority: FCC
- Facility ID: 70266
- Class: C3
- ERP: 15,000 watts
- HAAT: 114 meters (374 ft)
- Transmitter coordinates: 37°42′47.1″N 97°14′52.2″W

Links
- Public license information: Public file; LMS
- Webcast: Listen live (via Audacy)
- Website: www.audacy.com/power935

KDGS (93.5 FM "Power 93.5") is an urban-leaning rhythmic contemporary radio station serving the Wichita, Kansas market. The station is licensed to Andover, Kansas, is owned by Audacy, Inc. and broadcasts with an ERP of 15 kW. The station's studios are located on East Douglas Avenue in Wichita, while the transmitter is located at 1601 North Rock Road in Wichita.

== History ==
The station that is now KDGS was assigned a construction permit for 93.9 FM on July 23, 1993, and issued as KOAS. The station officially signed on the air as KDLE on October 28, 1993, and aired an Adult Contemporary format. The station was originally owned by Gary and Ann Violet, the former owners of KBUZ (which resided at 106.5 FM and 99.1 FM, respectively); Metro Media, a division of New Life Fellowship Inc., whose principal was local pastor David Brace, would lease and operate the station under a local marketing agreement. On May 4, 1994, KDLE flipped the format to Urban Contemporary as "Power 93.9", filling the void that was left by the previous incarnations of KBUZ.

In June 1995, the Violets began an effort to assume control of KDLE after Yes Inc. (the former Metro Media) missed a lease payment, as well as the Violets wanting to distance themselves from Brace, who was arrested on money laundering charges. In addition, several employees resigned, and concern about the station's future grew among listeners, with many fearing that the Violets were considering changing the station's format, not unlike the previous two incarnations of KBUZ. After a five month legal battle, the Violets would take full control of KDLE on October 27, 1995.

On December 8, 1995, KDLE changed call letters to KDGS, and shifted to a Rhythmic Contemporary Hit direction with Rhythmic Pop/Dance product incorporated into its R&B/Hip-Hop fare, which they still continue with today. In February 2000, the station was acquired by Entercom Communications (now Audacy). KDGS was one of the first stations for Christopher "Kidd Chris" Foley, who is now at WEBN in Cincinnati as a weekday morning rock jock. Past music director Richard "Ricardo Cherry" Brugada was awarded Music Director of The Year in 1999 by S.I.N. for the work he did with KDGS. Cherry was music director for KDGS from 1996-1999, and was also an on-air talent from 1995-1999.

On May 21, 2014, the station applied to the FCC to change their transmitter location from South Wichita (near the I-135/I-235 interchange) to East Wichita, downgrade their power to 15,000 watts, and change frequencies to 93.5 FM. This was due to an FCC order to avoid adjacent channel interference with Bott Radio Network's KCVW (94.3 FM), as they applied to relocate their transmitter from west of Cheney Reservoir in Reno County to the Wichita master antenna farm in western Sedgwick County near Colwich and upgrade their signal to 94,000 watts to effectively cover the entire Wichita market. On October 15, 2014, at Midnight, KDGS went dark on 93.9 FM; after 2 hours off air, the station officially completed its move to 93.5 FM. KOTE in Eureka, broadcasting on 93.5 FM and owned by Niemeyer Communications, moved to 93.9 FM at the same time to reduce co-channel interference, effectively swapping frequencies between the two stations. (The 93.9 FM frequency in Wichita is now occupied by translator K230BY, which relays KGSO (1410 AM).)

In early 2015, the station's studios moved to the Ruffin Building at 9111 East Douglas, formerly the Pizza Hut headquarters.
