= KEYN-FM =

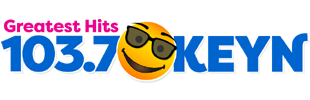
- Wichita, Kansas; United States
- Broadcast area: Wichita metropolitan area
- Frequency: 103.7 MHz (HD Radio)
- Branding: 103.7 KEYN

Programming
- Language: English
- Format: Classic hits
- Affiliations: Premiere Networks; United Stations Radio Networks; Wichita State Shockers

Ownership
- Owner: Audacy, Inc.; (Audacy License, LLC)
- Sister stations: KDGS; KFBZ; KFH; KNSS; KNSS-FM

History
- First air date: 1967
- Call sign meaning: phonetically similar to "keen" (former brand's target audience)

Technical information
- Licensing authority: FCC
- Facility ID: 53151
- Class: C0
- ERP: 98,000 watts (100,000 with beam tilt)
- HAAT: 307 meters (1,007 ft)
- Transmitter coordinates: 37.800°N 97.525°W

Links
- Public license information: Public file; LMS
- Webcast: Listen live (via Audacy)
- Website: www.audacy.com/keyn

KEYN-FM (103.7 MHz) is a radio station operating in Wichita, Kansas, owned by Audacy, Inc. The station broadcasts a classic hits music format, featuring hits from the 1970s and 1980s. The station's studios are located on East Douglas Avenue in East Wichita, while the transmitter is located outside Colwich, Kansas.

== History ==
KEYN-FM signed on the air in October 1968 as a Top 40/CHR station, the first stereo FM station west of the Mississippi River. The station was co-owned with KEYN (then at 900 AM, now KSGL), with both stations simulcasting until 1975, when the AM flipped to country. In the 1970s, their studios were located at 2829 North Salina in Wichita. Later, studios were moved to the west end of the Central Heights Shopping Center at Central Avenue and Ridge Road. During that time, the station's identification jingle was "FM 104 KEYN The Rock Of Wichita", and featured a graphic depicting the faces of Mount Rushmore, wearing stereo headphones. In 1974, KEYN AM and KEYN-FM was purchased by Robert Freeman, Lowell Denniston, and Frank Carney. Their AM sister station was sold in 1977, though KEYN-FM would become a sister station to KWBB (1410 AM) shortly thereafter. The station was purchased by TM alum Jimmy Long and country music artist Charley Pride doing business as Long-Pride Broadcasting in 1980; also that year, KEYN (AM) flipped to oldies under new KQAM call letters.

During the Top 40/CHR years, KEYN went by a few names, including "104 FM KEYN", "MusicRadio 104 KEYN", "103.7 KEYN", and "Power 104 KEYN".

Long-Pride Broadcasting sold KEYN-FM and their sister station KQAM in 1987 to Aberdeen Communications. On August 30, 1989, at Noon, after almost 22 years of playing the hits, KEYN-FM flipped to oldies as simply "KEYN FM 104". The final song as "Power 104" was "The End of the Innocence" by Don Henley, while the first song under the new format was "Ticket to Ride" by The Beatles. Aberdeen allowed their company to go to receivership in 1991, and was bought by Clear Channel Communications the following year. Throughout the late 1990s and 2000s, KEYN's format gradually evolved to Classic Hits. It previously used the slogans as "Good Time Oldies", "Wichita's Fun Oldies", and "The Greatest Hits of All Time". Their current slogan is "Greatest Hits 103.7 KEYN". Triathlon Broadcasting bought the station in 1994; Entercom (now Audacy) bought KEYN-FM in February 2000.

In early 2015, the station moved from the Brittany Place Shopping Center at East 21st Street and North Woodlawn Avenue to the Ruffin Building at 9111 East Douglas, formerly the Pizza Hut headquarters.

== Programming ==
KEYN regularly plays hit songs from the 1970s and 1980s. It is also the official flagship radio station for all Wichita State Shockers men's basketball games and select Wichita State Shockers women's basketball games.
