= Matjaž Šinkovec =

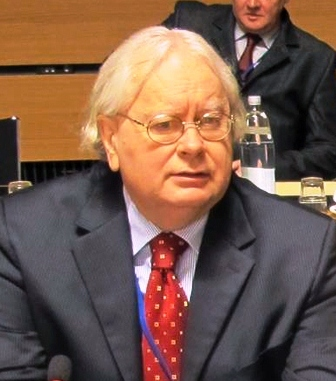
Šinkovec in 2013

Matjaž Šinkovec (Slovene pronunciation: [ˈmáːtjaʃ ˈʃìːŋkɔʋəts]; born on 22 May 1951) is a Slovenian diplomat, politician, translator, journalist and science fiction writer. He was one of the co-founders of the Slovenian Democratic Party.

== Early life and career ==
Šinkovec was born in Ljubljana, at the time part of Yugoslavia, to Ivan Šinkovec, editor and businessman, and Vilma Likar, former resistance member and convict. He attended the Poljane Grammar School, where he was the coeditor of the student magazine Mladi Poljanec, and the Šentvid Grammar School, where he was questioned by the political police for his views on Slovenia. After joining his father in California, he received a B.A. in English and Spanish in 1974 and an M.A. in creative writing in 1976 from Lone Mountain College/University of San Francisco. He authored several stories, including one that depicted a future parliamentary role in democratic Slovenia.

Upon returning to Slovenia, he was employed as a journalist at the daily newspaper Delo, previously associated with his father, and later worked as a freelance translator and author of science fiction short stories published in Slovenia and abroad. He translated novels by Agatha Christie, Kurt Vonnegut, and Alan Dean Foster into Slovene, as well as scripts for TV Ljubljana programs. He was one of the founders and later president of the SSU Science Fiction Association, and he coedited its magazine Občasnik.

In 1978, he joined the Republic Secretariat for International Cooperation, which functioned as Slovenia's foreign office, where he covered Western countries. He contributed to the development of strategies for relations with the United Kingdom and the United States, and he wrote entries on Slovenian–British and Slovenian–French relations for the Encyclopedia of Slovenia. From 1984 to 1990, he served as the international secretary of the Confederation of Trade Unions of Slovenia, focusing on strengthening ties with trade unions in the Alps–Adriatic region, which later influenced the development of political relations in that area.

== Early political activity ==
In 1989, he was one of the co-founders of the SDZS, the Slovenian Social Democratic Party, together with France Tomšič and Jože Pučnik, where he took over the party's relations with foreign political parties and the Socialist, Liberal, and Conservative Internationals. The magazine Mladina assessed his activities as those of an "informal foreign minister." In his address at the widely attended founding convention of the party in February 1989 at the Cankar Center, he proposed that the first new Slovenian political party should not only be social democratic, but also liberal and business oriented. A year later, he proposed the formation of the rainbow Democratic List as a coalition of all the new democratic political forces in Slovenia to contest together the first democratic elections in 1990. When the opposition coalition finally formed in December 1989, he proposed its name, DEMOS. In the first democratic elections in 1990, DEMOS won, and Šinkovec was elected as an MP on the list of his Social Democratic Party.

Between 1990 and 1992, he chaired the Parliamentary Foreign Affairs Committee and concurrently served as Social Democratic Party vice president, and later also as the parliamentary group leader and member of the DEMOS Council. He briefly served as secretary general of the Association of Central European Social Democratic parties. Between 1991 and 1992, he was the chief negotiator for independent Slovenia at the International Conference on the former Yugoslavia led by Peter Carington. In the same period, he also served as head of the first Slovenian delegation to the Parliamentary Assembly of the Council of Europe. In September 1991, he proposed Slovenia's membership in NATO at the North Atlantic Assembly in Madrid.

== Diplomatic career and brief return to politics ==
In April 1992, Šinkovec entered the diplomatic service. Between 1992 and 1997, he served as the first Slovenian ambassador to the United Kingdom, and between 1996 and 1997 also to the Republic of Ireland. He concurrently also represented Slovenia in a host of international organizations in London, including the International Maritime Organization and INMARSAT.

Returning home in late 1997, he was appointed state undersecretary for security policy at the Slovenian Ministry of Foreign Affairs. Late in 1998, he was asked by Prime Minister Janez Drnovšek to head, as ambassador, Slovenia’s mission to NATO and the Western European Union. From January 1999 to Slovenia becoming a NATO member in May 2004, he worked on his country fulfilling all the membership criteria, with the backdrop of Slovenia changing six governments during his term of office. With Slovenia's membership in the alliance, he became a member of the North Atlantic Council and permanent representative of Slovenia to the North Atlantic Treaty Organization. He was the initiator of several cooperation schemes between Slovenia and NATO, including Air Ground Surveillance, Slovenia’s membership in the C-17 SAC Consortium, and NATO's solution for Slovenian airspace control, as well as the signatory of a host of agreements between Slovenia and NATO. In 2004, he became a founding member of the Assembly for the Republic (Zbor za republiko), together with 24 Slovenian center-right personalities.

In April 2006, he was appointed director of the Slovenian Intelligence and Security Agency (SOVA).

In October 2007, after having submitted a SOVA reform plan to the government, he left the agency and reentered politics as a state secretary in Prime Minister Janez Janša’s office, performing his duties at the Ministry of Foreign Affairs, mostly in carrying out Slovenia’s first presidency of the Council of the European Union in the first half of 2008. Starting in January 2008, he was concurrently also the political director of the MFA. In October of that year, the government appointed him ambassador to the United States and Mexico. Even though he had obtained agreements from the US and Mexico and passed the Foreign Affairs Committee hearing in the Slovenian Parliament, Slovene President Danilo Türk refused to permit the government's appointment.

Following the change of government, the new minister of foreign affairs, Samuel Žbogar, appointed Šinkovec as his special envoy for Slovenia's 2011 United Nations Security Council candidature. During the following three years, Šinkovec lobbied bilaterally and multilaterally globally to gain support for Slovenia’s bid, in competition with Hungary, Armenia, and Azerbaijan. After Slovenia's lead in the UN count and with Armenia and Hungary dropping out of the race, Šinkovec was appointed ambassador and permanent representative to the Political and Security Committee of the European Union. In the following six years, in over a thousand interventions both in committee and with world leaders, Šinkovec sought to participate in shaping EU policy in line with Slovenia's positions and his personal initiatives, especially on Ukraine and the Middle East. In time, he became dean of the Committee. He also served as Slovenia's member of the Board of Governors of the European Endowment for Democracy.

In September 2013, Šinkovec was concurrently appointed a non-resident ambassador to Belgium and, consequently, a non-resident ambassador to Luxembourg, Cape Verde, Ethiopia, and the African Union. With his return to Slovenia in 2017, he was appointed national coordinator for relations with African states and African international and regional organizations.

Šinkovec has delivered lectures at institutions including the University of Oxford, the University of Cambridge, the London School of Economics, Stanford University, the University of Skopje, and the University of Maribor. He has also contributed articles to various publications. During his diplomatic career, he was involved in establishing bilateral diplomatic relations between Slovenia and several countries across Europe, the Caribbean, Central America, the Pacific, and Africa. Šinkovec retired from diplomatic service in May 2022, concluding a 30-year ambassadorial career.

== Publications ==
- Šinkovec, Matjaž; Novak, Božidar (1990). Kako zmagati na volitvah: praktični priročnik za izvedbo uspešne predvolilne kampanje. Ljubljana: ČKZ. COBISS 17334784
- Šinkovec, Matjaž (2002). What a waste love affairs. USA: 1st Books Library. COBISS 289414400, ISBN 978-0-75967-795-1
- Šinkovec, Matjaž (2002). Stardrive – Selected short stories of romance, fantasy and science fiction. USA: 1st Books Library. ISBN 0-7596-8017-5
- Šinkovec, Matjaž (2003). Love – A Collection of Short Stories. USA: iUniverse.
- Šinkovec, Matjaž; Žvokelj, Barbara-595-27444-7, ur. (2006). Goodbye NATO*: *everything you wanted to know about it but were afraid to ask; a collection of farewell speeches of ambassadors, permanent representatives on the North Atlantic Council, and its chairman - secretary general of NATO. USA: Lulu. COBISS 246646016, ISBN 978-1-4303-0098-4
- Brezigar, Bojan; Jazbec, Milan; Marn, Matej; Pipan, Anita; Pirnat, Žiga; Šinkovec, Matjaž; Šuc, Gregor, ur. (2008). Predsedovanje Slovenije Svetu Evropske unije: zunanji odnosi. Ljubljana: Ministrstvo za zunanje zadeve Republike Slovenije. COBISS 240299008, ISBN 978-961-6566-07-0
- Šinkovec, Matjaž (2012). 1001 laws of survival. USA: Lulu. COBISS 295475200, ISBN 978-1-300-57547-4
- Šinkovec, Matjaž (2012). The magic Mr. Sweeney or stardrive rejects: Stories of Fantasy & Science Fiction. USA: Lulu. COBISS 90886145
- Šinkovec, Matjaž (2013). The Book of Morian. USA: Lulu. COBISS 90884609, ISBN 978-1-304-43192-9
- Šinkovec, Matjaž (2013). Toy: as ut uv mawo. USA: Lulu. COBISS 289413632, ISBN 978-1-300-67569-3
- Šinkovec, Matjaž (2014). Čakajoč Samuela: prispevki k oblikovanju slovenske zunanje politike 2008-2012 med čakanjem na osebni pogovor z ministrom za zunanje zadeve. USA: Lulu. COBISS 512393331, ISBN 978-1-304-61174-1
- Šinkovec, Matjaž (2014). The 2020 Vision for the Western Balkans : the Rough Version. USA: Lulu. COBISS 90888961, ISBN 978-1-304-82017-4
- Šinkovec, Matjaž; Luznar, Pia, ur. (2017). The Truth Is Our Most Powerful Weapon: Political Prisoners of Today and Yesterday. USA: Lulu. COBISS 295476224, ISBN 978-1-312-90853-6
- Šinkovec, Matjaž; Perčič, Monika, ur. (2019). Quo vadis: Slovenija v Afriki: deklaracije, strategije, izjave in razmišljanja. S.I.: Nkoza & Nankya Press. COBISS 72449795, ISBN 978-1-387-70096-7
- Šinkovec, Matjaž (2022). NATO: Lost or Found, Speeches Articles and Stuff Verbatim 1991-2021. iUniverse. ISBN 978-1-6632-3426-1 (sc), ISBN 978-1-6632-3427-8 (e), LCCN 2022-900428

== Personal life ==
Matjaž Šinkovec is married to Magdalena Šinkovec (née Novak), author of Culinary Cosmic Top Secrets – A NATO Cookbook. The couple has two sons: Boštjan Šinkovec, who serves as a Senior EU Affairs Advisor at the Slovenian Business & Research Association in Brussels, and Aleš Šinkovec, Managing Director at the consulting firm Teneo, also based in Brussels.

His personal interests include do-it-yourself (DIY) projects, swimming, and trekking. He also engages in amateur winemaking in Slovenia’s Upper Carniola region under the private label Château Sheen-Coates. Šinkovec is an author of poetry, fiction, and essays on international affairs, alternative history, and philosophical topics. One of his works, "Toy Toy", is written in an invented language called “Lovenian”.

== See also ==
- Foreign relations of Slovenia
- Politics of Slovenia
