= KSKL =

- Scott City, Kansas; United States
- Frequency: 94.5 MHz
- Branding: "Mix 94.5"

Programming
- Format: Adult contemporary
- Affiliations: ABC News Radio

Ownership
- Owner: Murfin Media; (Western Kansas Broadcast Center, LLC)
- Sister stations: KBUF, KHGN, KKJQ, KSKZ, KSSA, KULY, KWKR

History
- Former call signs: KFLA-FM (1965–1976); KULL (1976–1983); KEZU (1983–1990)

Technical information
- Licensing authority: FCC
- Facility ID: 71853
- Class: C1
- ERP: 100,000 watts
- HAAT: 107 metres (351 ft)
- Transmitter coordinates: 38°31′35″N 100°54′42″W

Links
- Public license information: Public file; LMS
- Webcast: Listen Live
- Website: www.westernkansasnews.com/mix94/

KSKL (94.5 FM) is a radio station licensed to serve the community of Scott City, Kansas, United States. The station is owned by Murfin Media, LLC, through licensee Western Kansas Broadcast Center, LLC, and airs an adult contemporary format.

The station was assigned the call sign KFLA-FM by the Federal Communications Commission on June 7, 1965. The station changed its call sign to KULL on December 1, 1976, to KEZU on August 1, 1983, and to KSKL on March 30, 1990.
