= Confederation of Trade Unions of Slovenia PERGAM =

National trade union center in Slovenia

KSS PERGAM
- Confederation of Trade Unions of Slovenia PERGAM
- Konfederacija sindikatov Slovenije Pergam
- Founded: 1991
- Headquarters: Ljubljana, Slovenia
- Location: Slovenia
- Key people: Dušan Rebolj, president Vida Fras, general secretary
- Website: www.sindikat-pergam.si

The Confederation of Trade Unions of Slovenia PERGAM (Slovene: Konfederacija sindikatov Slovenije PERGAM) (KSS PERGAM) is a national trade union center in Slovenia. It was created in 1991 as a breakaway union from the Confederation of New Trade Unions of Slovenia "Independence" (KNSS "Independence").
