= KULY =

KULY and KHGN
KULY: Ulysses, Kansas; KHGN: Hugoton, Kansas; United States
- Frequencies: KULY: 1420 kHz; KHGN: 106.7 MHz
- Branding: Hometown Radio 97.7 FM & 1420 AM

Programming
- Format: KULY: Classic hits; KHGN: 1980s hits
- Affiliations: KULY: Kansas City Royals

Ownership
- Owner: My Town Media; (Western Kansas Broadcast Center, LLC)
- Sister stations: KBUF, KSKZ, KSKL, KWKR, KSSA, KHGN, KKJQ

History
- First air date: KULY: March 1, 1965; KHGN: September 16, 1983
- Former call signs: KHGN: KHUQ (1983–1989); KFXX-FM (1989–2016); KULY-FM (2016–2019)
- Call sign meaning: KULY: Ulysses; KHGN: Hugoton

Technical information
- Licensing authority: FCC
- Facility ID: KULY: 198; KHGN: 199
- Class: KULY: B; KHGN: C1
- Power: KULY: 1,000 watts (day); 500 watts (night)
- ERP: KHGN: 55,000 watts
- HAAT: KHGN: 78 meters (256 ft)
- Transmitter coordinates: KULY: 37°32′53.00″N 101°21′51.00″W; KHGN: 37°18′57.00″N 101°20′18.00″W
- Translator(s): KULY: 97.7 K249FI (Ulysses)

Links
- Public license information: KULY: Public file; LMS; KHGN: Public file; LMS
- Webcast: KULY: Listen live KHGN: Listen live
- Website: KULY: Official website; KHGN: Official website

KULY (1420 AM) and KHGN (106.7 FM) are radio stations licensed to Ulysses, Kansas and Hugoton, Kansas, United States, respectively. KULY airs a classic hits format. KHGN airs a 1980s hits format. The stations are currently owned by My Town Media, through licensee Western Kansas Broadcast Center, LLC.

Logo while simulcasting
