= KFBZ =

Radio station in Haysville–Wichita, Kansas

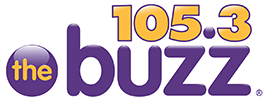
- Haysville, Kansas; United States
- Broadcast area: Wichita metropolitan area
- Frequency: 105.3 MHz (HD Radio)
- Branding: 105.3 The Buzz

Programming
- Language: English
- Format: Hot adult contemporary
- Affiliations: Westwood One

Ownership
- Owner: Audacy, Inc.; (Audacy License, LLC)
- Sister stations: KDGS; KEYN-FM; KFH; KNSS; KNSS-FM

History
- First air date: August 25, 1985 (as KXLK)
- Former call signs: KXLK (1985–96); KWSJ (1996–2000); KWCY (2000)
- Call sign meaning: "Buzz"

Technical information
- Licensing authority: FCC
- Facility ID: 53153
- Class: C0
- ERP: 98,000 watts (100,000 with beam tilt)
- HAAT: 307 meters (1,007 ft)
- Transmitter coordinates: 37.800°N 97.525°W

Links
- Public license information: Public file; LMS
- Webcast: Listen live (via Audacy)
- Website: www.audacy.com/1053thebuzz

KFBZ (105.3 FM) is a radio station operating in Wichita, Kansas, and licensed to Haysville, Kansas as "105.3 The Buzz". The station airs a hot adult contemporary format and it is owned by Audacy, Inc. The station's studios are located near Douglas Avenue and Webb Road in eastern Wichita (in the former Pizza Hut headquarters), while the transmitter is located outside Colwich, Kansas.

== History ==
What is now KFBZ signed on the air on August 25, 1985, with an adult contemporary format as "FM 105 KXLK", and later evolved into a Hot AC direction as "Mix 105". On October 4, 1996, at Noon, the station flipped formats to Smooth Jazz as KWSJ, "105.3 The Oasis". The flip gave Wichita its first Smooth Jazz station since 1989, when KLZS "Magic 98" (now KRBB) flipped to adult contemporary. On March 15, 2000, KWSJ moved its Smooth Jazz format briefly to KANR (then at 92.7 FM, now at 99.7 FM), then to KAYY (98.7 FM, now news/talk-formatted KNSS-FM) two months later. This was to make room for another Country station in Wichita: KWCY, "Y-105". Due to continued low ratings, the format lasted only 8 months. In November 2000, after playing "How Do You Like Me Now" by Toby Keith, the Country format was dropped when the station started stunting by playing theme songs to TV shows before finally flipping to an all-80s hits format as KFBZ, "105.3 The Buzz", at 1:30 p.m. on November 17, 2000. The first song on "The Buzz" was "Let's Go Crazy" by Prince. The station briefly had great success with this format, however experienced dwindling ratings by mid-2001.

In January 2002, KFBZ morphed into its current Hot AC format, and the station began airing the syndicated Kidd Kraddick Morning Show on December 12, 2005. During the 2007-2009 holiday seasons, KFBZ aired an all-Christmas music format. However, beginning in 2010 (and years following), the station has not played Christmas music.

The station has had five program directors in its history; Barry McKay from its inception until March 2005; JJ Morgan from April 2005 until November 2007; Dusty Hayes from December 2007 until December 2016; Casey Osburn from January 2017 to April 2024; and Greg Williams from April 2024 to present.

Beginning July 30, 2018, the Buzz ended the Kidd Kraddick Morning Show an hour earlier at 9 am to coincide with the live ending of the show (choosing not to air the repeat 9 am hour). The station also began airing the syndicated show The Daly Download With Carson Daly on May 4, 2019 on Saturday mornings and Sunday evenings.

In early 2015, the radio station moved to the Ruffin Building at 9111 East Douglas, formerly the Pizza Hut headquarters.

May 30, 2026 was the last day of the Kidd Kraddick Morning Show airing in the morning. June 1, 2026 The Brett Mega show will be playing from 6 to 10 a.m. The Brett Mega show used to be an afternoon program from 2 to 6 P.M.
