= KSGL =

Coordinates: 37°41′33″N 97°22′54″W

- Wichita, Kansas; United States
- Frequency: 900 AM
- Branding: KSGL 900 AM

Programming
- Format: Religious radio; adult standards

Ownership
- Owner: Agape Communications Inc.

History
- First air date: October 15, 1958 (first license granted)
- Former call signs: KSIR (1958-1967); KEYN (1967-1974); KBUL (1974-1977)
- Call sign meaning: "Sharing God's Love"

Technical information
- Licensing authority: FCC
- Facility ID: 610
- Class: D
- Power: 250 watts (day); 28 watts (night)
- Translator: 105.7 K289CI (Wichita)

Links
- Public license information: Public file; LMS
- Website: KSGL AM 900 Website

KSGL (900 AM) is a religious/adult standards music formatted radio station licensed in Wichita, Kansas, and is owned by Agape Communications Inc.

== History ==
KSGL's format history includes Top 40 as KEYN, mostly simulcasting with its FM counterpart KEYN-FM.

In July 1977, the KEYN call letters and Top 40 format moved from AM 900 to AM 1410 (formerly KWBB in the 1960s and early 1970s and would be the future sister station to KSGL). AM 900 became KSGL and signed on with a Christian format, the first station to carry the format in Wichita since there were no other stations in the market that carried Christian programming full-time on the radio at the time.

KSGL's Christian programming still airs to this day with an addition of adult standards music in different dayparts. The adult standards format was previously aired on its former sister station KMYR (1410 AM), which was sold to Steckline Communications and is now sports station KGSO.
