= World village =

World village may refer to:

- World village, an alternate name for the term "global village"
- World Village, full name Harmonia Mundi - World Village, a world music international record label
- World Village Festival, annual music festival in Helsinki, Finland
- Give Kids The World Village, nonprofit resort in Kissimmee, Florida for children with life-threatening illnesses and their families

== See also ==
- Global village (disambiguation)
