= KSSA =

Radio station in Ingalls, Kansas

- Ingalls, Kansas; United States
- Broadcast area: Garden City/Dodge City
- Frequency: 105.9 MHz
- Branding: La Ke Buena 105.9

Programming
- Format: Regional Mexican

Ownership
- Owner: My Town Media; (Western Kansas Broadcast Center, LLC)
- Sister stations: KBUF, KHGN, KKJQ, KSKL, KSKZ, KULY, KWKR

History
- Former call signs: KBIE (1998, CP)

Technical information
- Licensing authority: FCC
- Facility ID: 77873
- Class: C1
- ERP: 100,000 watts
- HAAT: 203.0 meters (666.0 ft)
- Transmitter coordinates: 37°46′48″N 100°27′36″W

Links
- Public license information: Public file; LMS
- Website: www.westernkansasnews.com/kssa/

KSSA (105.9 FM) La Ke Buena is a radio station broadcasting a Regional Mexican format. Licensed to Ingalls, Kansas, United States, the station is currently owned by My Town Media, through licensee Western Kansas Broadcast Center, LLC.

== History ==
The station was assigned the call sign KBIE on July 17, 1998. On December 12, 1998, the station changed its call sign to KSSA.
