= KBUF =

- Holcomb, Kansas; United States
- Frequency: 1030 kHz
- Branding: Ag News 1030

Programming
- Format: News Talk Information
- Affiliations: ABC Radio, Premiere Radio Networks

Ownership
- Owner: My Town Media; (Western Kansas Broadcast Center, LLC)
- Sister stations: KHGN, KKJQ, KSKL, KSKZ, KSSA, KULY, KWKR

History
- First air date: 1976

Technical information
- Licensing authority: FCC
- Facility ID: 33689
- Class: B
- Power: 2,500 watts day 1,200 watts night
- Transmitter coordinates: 38°0′1″N 100°53′54″W
- Translator: (107.1 MHz) K296HO (Holcomb)

Links
- Public license information: Public file; LMS
- Website: www.westernkansasnews.com/kbuf/

KBUF (1030 AM) is a radio station broadcasting a News Talk Information format. Licensed to Holcomb, Kansas, United States, the station is currently owned by My Town Media, through licensee Western Kansas Broadcast Center, LLC, and features programming from ABC Radio and Premiere Radio Networks. Formerly a country-oriented station, the station runs news and talk, and features strong agribusiness reporting.

== Former hosts/announcers ==
- Hap Larson
- Corey Hayze (Program Director 1993–1995)
- Loretta P. "Lory Williams" Johnson
