= KMUW =

Public radio station in Wichita, Kansas

- Wichita, Kansas; United States
- Frequency: 89.1 MHz
- Branding: 89.1 KMUW

Programming
- Format: Public radio; news/talk; eclectic music
- Affiliations: National Public Radio, Public Radio Exchange, American Public Media, BBC World Service

Ownership
- Owner: Wichita State University

History
- First air date: April 26, 1949
- Former call signs: Municipal University of Wichita (former name of Wichita State University)

Technical information
- Licensing authority: FCC
- Facility ID: 72364
- Class: C1
- ERP: 100,000 watts
- HAAT: 277.6 meters (911 ft)
- Transmitter coordinates: 37°46′28″N 97°30′53″W

Links
- Public license information: Public file; LMS
- Website: kmuw.org

KMUW (89.1 MHz), is a non-commercial public radio station licensed to serve Wichita, Kansas. KMUW broadcasts programming from National Public Radio, American Public Media, Public Radio Exchange, and the BBC World Service.

== History ==
KMUW went on the air on April 26, 1949, originally broadcasting a college radio format produced by about 50 students of the Municipal University of Wichita (now Wichita State University) from 10 am to 2 pm every weekday. The station originally broadcast at 10 watts, which could only cover the campus of Wichita University, with a later power increase to 250 watts in 1961. KMUW broadcast local college news, sports, and classical music.

In 1970, KMUW received a grant from the Corporation for Public Broadcasting to increase its power to 10,000 watts, covering the Wichita metropolitan area; the transmitter was located on the same tower as KTVH-TV channel 12 (now KWCH-DT). It became a charter member of National Public Radio in 1971, and was one of the 90 stations to broadcast the first inaugural broadcast of All Things Considered.

On January 1980, KMUW began operating with the satellite feed from NPR, giving listeners higher quality programming and audio channels, along with more live programming. Previously, programs were broadcast via landline on mono or by KPTS satellite for stereo programs. KMUW further extended their broadcast range in 1986 by upgrading its power to 100,000 watts and raising their tower height. The station could cover as north as McPherson, as south as the Kansas-Oklahoma border, as west as Kingman, and as east as the Flint Hills. The station broadcast 24 hours a day.

KMUW was subject to controversy when on December 14, 1987, 1:30 am, a disc jockey named Kevin Smith of the 14 year Wichita indie/alternative music tradition After Midnight decided to test the FCC's safe harbor by broadcasting a song "Permafrost" by Magazine, a post-punk band, which contained profanity. Later that morning, a listener had complained, and the station manager Joan Freund issued a memo that announcers that air indecencies in general would be fired, and the After Midnight tradition would discontinue operations if such word made it on the air again. This incident has been referred to by student disc jockeys as "the Permafrost incident". Despite protests from After Midnight disc jockeys, KMUW would no longer air After Midnight for the time being.

On July 1990, KMUW had immediately announced changes to its broadcast schedule, going of the air from midnight to 5 am on weekdays, and from midnight to 6 am on weekends, effectively discontinuing the After Midnight program. The general manager Gary Shivers said that the changes were effective immediately so that students that are losing their jobs would not "vent their anger on the air", and giving Wichita State University more control of the programming and to provide a better training experience for its students. Many WSU students were upset at the discontinuation of the After Midnight program. In addition, other programs previously broadcast on KMUW that were removed were live coverage of the Wichita City Council meetings and a Sunday music program Gospel and Reminiscence, aimed at the black community.

=== Location ===
On April 25, 2016, KMUW moved to 121 North Mead Suite 200 in "old town" area of downtown Wichita.

== See also ==
- Global Village
