= KKJQ =

FM radio station in Garden City, Kansas

- Garden City, Kansas; United States
- Frequency: 97.3 MHz
- Branding: Q97

Programming
- Format: Country
- Affiliations: Westwood One, Premiere Radio Networks

Ownership
- Owner: My Town Media; (Western Kansas Broadcast Center, LLC)
- Sister stations: KBUF, KHGN, KSKL, KSKZ, KSSA, KULY, KWKR

History
- Former call signs: KBUF-FM (1980–1984)

Technical information
- Licensing authority: FCC
- Facility ID: 33690
- Class: C1
- ERP: 100,000 watts
- HAAT: 244.0 meters (800.5 ft)
- Transmitter coordinates: 37°46′48″N 100°27′36″W

Links
- Public license information: Public file; LMS
- Website: www.westernkansasnews.com/q97/

KKJQ (97.3 FM, "Q97") is a radio station broadcasting a country music format. Its city of license is Garden City, Kansas, United States. The station is currently owned by Murfin Drilling Company, through licensee Western Kansas Broadcast Center, LLC, and features programming from Westwood One and Premiere Radio Networks.

== History ==
The station went on the air as KBUF-FM on February 1, 1980. On July 23, 1984, the station changed its call sign to the current KKJQ. National Association of Farm Broadcasters honoree Loretta P. "Lory Williams" Johnson served as the farm broadcaster at KKJQ from 1986 until her death in 2021.
