= KSKZ =

Radio station in Copeland, Kansas

- Copeland, Kansas; United States
- Broadcast area: Dodge City/Garden City
- Frequency: 98.1 MHz
- Branding: Z98

Programming
- Format: Top 40/CHR
- Affiliations: Premiere Networks

Ownership
- Owner: My Town Media; (Western Kansas Broadcast Center, LLC)
- Sister stations: KBUF, KHGN, KKJQ, KSKL, KSSA, KULY, KWKR

History
- Former call signs: KYBD

Technical information
- Licensing authority: FCC
- Facility ID: 60873
- Class: C1
- ERP: 100,000 watts
- HAAT: 203.0 meters
- Transmitter coordinates: 37°46′48.00″N 100°27′36.00″W

Links
- Public license information: Public file; LMS
- Webcast: http://www.westernkansasnews.com/z98/

KSKZ (98.1 FM) is a radio station broadcasting a Top 40/CHR format. Licensed to Copeland, Kansas, United States, the station serves the Dodge City and Garden City areas. The station is currently owned by Murfin Media, through licensee Western Kansas Broadcast Center, LLC, and features programming from Premiere Networks.
