= KWKR =

Radio station in Leoti–Garden City, Kansas

- Leoti, Kansas; United States
- Broadcast area: Garden City, Kansas
- Frequency: 99.9 MHz
- Branding: The Rock 99.9

Programming
- Format: Mainstream rock

Ownership
- Owner: My Town Media; (Western Kansas Broadcast Center, LLC)
- Sister stations: KBUF, KHGN, KKJQ, KSKL, KSKZ, KSSA, KULY

History
- First air date: November 1, 1983
- Former call signs: KWKR (1983–1995); KSKZ (1995–2005)
- Call sign meaning: K Western Kansas Rocks

Technical information
- Licensing authority: FCC
- Facility ID: 67042
- Class: C1
- ERP: 97,000 watts (ERP); 99,000 watts (Beam Tilt)
- HAAT: 121 meters (397 ft)
- Transmitter coordinates: 38°16′39.0″N 101°17′50.0″W

Links
- Public license information: Public file; LMS
- Webcast: KWKR Webstream
- Website: KWKR Online

KWKR (99.9 FM) is a mainstream rock formatted broadcast radio station licensed to Leoti, Kansas, serving the Garden City market though its signal aligns more to West-Central Kansas. KWKR is owned by My Town Media, through licensee Western Kansas Broadcast Center, LLC.

On November 27, 2019, KWKR changed its format from sports to mainstream rock, branded as "The Rock 99.9".

KWKR's signal is simulcast on KMML, Cimarron, to aid in covering Dodge City.
