= Mark Moss =

American neurobiologist

Mark B. Moss is an American neurobiologist currently the Waterhouse Professor at Boston University.
