= Global Village (American radio show) =

- Genre: world music
- Running time: 1 hour
- Country of origin: United States
- Language(s): English
- Home station: KMUW
- Syndicates: Public Radio Exchange
- Starring: Chris Heim
- Recording studio: Wichita, Kansas
- Original release: 2007
- Website: kmuw.org/programs/global-village

Global Village is a world music radio show distributed to public and community radio stations across the United States. The program has been on the air locally since 2007 on KMUW-FM, Wichita Public Radio, and distributed across the U.S. since 2010. The program airs daily and has aired on over 130 stations across the U.S. In April, 2013, Global Village also began airing on the 62-station Radio New Zealand National public radio service. It was the Reader's Choice World Music Award winner for Best World Music Radio Show for 2012, and Number Four in the Public Radio Exchange (PRX) Zeitfunk Awards for Most Licensed Series. Global Village is hosted by radio host/producer and freelance writer Chris Heim (WHPK, WJKL, WXRT, WBEZ, KMUW). It is a production of KMUW, Wichita Public Radio and is distributed through the Public Radio Exchange.
