= KFH (AM) =

Sports radio station in Wichita, Kansas

- Wichita, Kansas; United States
- Broadcast area: Wichita metropolitan area
- Frequency: 1240 kHz
- Branding: 97.5 & 1240 KFH

Programming
- Language: English
- Format: Sports radio
- Affiliations: BetMGM Network; Westwood One Sports; Kansas City Royals; Kansas State Wildcats; Wichita State Shockers

Ownership
- Owner: Audacy, Inc.; (Audacy License, LLC)
- Sister stations: KDGS; KEYN-FM; KFBZ; KNSS; KNSS-FM

History
- First air date: October 28, 1947
- Former call signs: KAKE (1947–80); KAKZ (1980–85); KRZZ (1985–87); KNSS (1987–2004)
- Call sign meaning: "Kansas' Finest Hotel" (studios were formerly in Carey House Square at Douglas and Emporia, Wichita)

Technical information
- Licensing authority: FCC
- Facility ID: 53598
- Class: C
- Power: 630 watts unlimited
- Transmitter coordinates: 37°43′06″N 97°19′6.2″W
- Translator: 97.5 K248CY (Wichita)
- Repeater: 98.7 KNSS-HD2 (Clearwater)

Links
- Public license information: Public file; LMS
- Webcast: Listen live (via Audacy)
- Website: www.audacy.com/kfh

KFH (1240 kHz) is a commercial AM radio station in Wichita, Kansas. The station is owned by Audacy, Inc. It airs a sports radio format. The station's studios and offices are located on East Douglas Avenue.

KFH is powered at 630 watts, using a non-directional antenna. The transmitter is off West 19th Street, in Wichita, near Interstate 135. Programming is also heard in Wichita and adjacent communities on 250 watt FM translator K248CY at 97.5 MHz.

== Programming ==
KFH mostly carries nationally syndicated programs from ESPN Radio. Two local shows are heard on weekdays: Sports Daily with Jacob Albracht and Tommy Castor in late mornings and The Drive with Bob and Jeff Lutz in afternoon drive time. Some features from Westwood One Sports (formerly the Infinity Sports Network) are also heard, along with the syndicated Jim Rome Show in middays.

KFH carries Kansas City Royals baseball, Wichita State Shockers baseball, and Kansas State Wildcats football, men's basketball, and women's basketball. The station calls itself "Kansas Fan Headquarters".

== History ==
(For the history of the 1330 frequency, see KNSS)

=== KAKE radio ===
On October 28, 1947, the station signed on the air as KAKE, owned by the KAKE Broadcasting Company, Inc., and aired a full service format. The station's original power, was only 250 watts and the studios were located at 416 West Douglas Avenue. The station was a network affiliate of the Mutual Broadcasting System and later the Don Lee Network.

In 1954, KAKE added a TV station, KAKE-TV. It eventually affiliated with ABC. The AM station got an increase to 1,000 watts by day, remaining at 250 watts at night.

In the 1970s, KAKE switched to a middle of the road (MOR) format of popular music, news and talk. KAKE was affiliated with the ABC Entertainment Network.

=== KAKZ and KRZZ ===
In 1979, the TV station was sold to the Chronicle Publishing Company, parent company of the San Francisco Chronicle. While the TV station kept the KAKE-TV call sign, KAKE changed its call letters to KAKZ on February 1, 1980, flipped to adult contemporary, and was sold to Misco Broadcasting Company. KAKZ would change to adult standards on September 24, 1981, return to adult contemporary on March 19, 1984, and then flipped to news/talk on October 1, 1984. New West bought KAKZ in 1985; on October 1 of that year, KAKZ changed call letters to KRZZ, flipped back to adult contemporary, and began simulcasting on KRZZ-FM (then at 95.9 FM, now at 96.3 FM).

=== KNSS ===
On September 14, 1987, the station became all-talk as KNSS, adding shows from the ABC Talk Radio Network and NBC Talknet.

KNSS would change ownership in the 1990s; Prism Radio bought KNSS in 1993, followed by SFX Broadcasting in 1997. In 2000, Entercom acquired both KNSS and another AM station in Wichita, KFH.

=== KFH ===
On August 30, 2004, KFH moved from AM 1330 to AM 1240; concurrently, the KNSS call sign and format moved from AM 1240 to AM 1330. The reason for this was signal strength; 1330 has a better signal, at 5,000 watts, while 1240 broadcast at 1,000 watts full time. As a result, 1240 inherited the legacy of one of the oldest stations in Kansas; KFH signed on in 1922 as WEAH and became KFH in 1925.

After the frequency swap, KFH continued with a hot talk format, carrying shows such as Don & Mike and Loveline. It shifted back to a more mainstream talk format in 2006. On May 9, 2011, KFH changed its format to all-sports, affiliating with ESPN Radio. Programming was also simulcast on 98.7 FM, also owned by Entercom. It switched its call sign to KFH-FM, giving sports listeners the option to hear sports talk and play by play on either AM or FM.

=== New studios and new FM station ===
In early 2015, Entercom moved its Wichita radio stations to the Ruffin Building at 9111 East Douglas. It was formerly the Pizza Hut corporate headquarters.

KFH gave up its 50,000 watt FM simulcast on October 12, 2016, as KFH-FM became KNSS-FM, simulcasting the talk programming on KNSS. Entercom moved KFH's programming to a 250 watt FM translator station, K248CY (97.5 FM).

KFH aired Kansas City Chiefs football and University of Kansas Jayhawks football and men's basketball games until Chiefs games moved to their current Wichita affiliates KNSS (AM) and KNSS-FM in 2017 and Jayhawks games moved to their current affiliate KKGQ in 2021.

== See also ==
- List of three-letter broadcast call signs in the United States
