= Kidd Chris =

American radio show

KiddChris
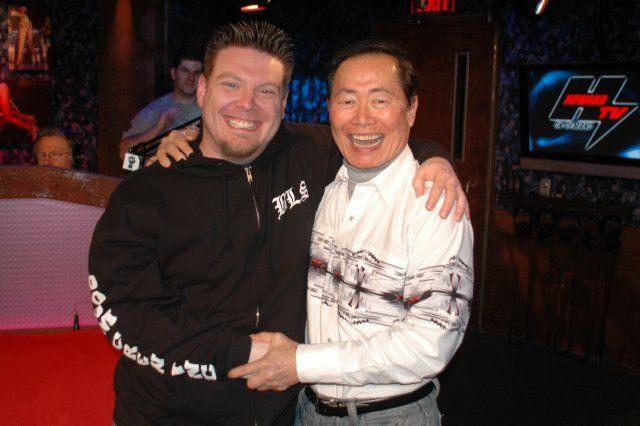
- KiddChris (left) with George Takei on The Howard Stern Show
- Genre: Radio; talk; comedy
- Original release: 1998

Christopher Derek Foley, commonly known as KiddChris (born 1974) is an American radio host. He has hosted radio shows in several cities since 1998.

The radio show originated in his hometown of Syracuse, New York. His controversial radio show made its way to Wichita, Kansas (KICT-FM T-95FM, KDGS Power 93.9FM, KANR FLY 92.7FM), which raised the ire of local church groups. Many religious organizations attempted to band together and remove KiddChris from the airwaves, but he remained on the air.

Chris then moved to Sacramento, California, where he hosted a morning show on a hip-hop station KSFM. After several months, he moved into an evening show on the sister FM talk station KXOA. KiddChris's four-hour talk show was one of the highest-rated radio shows on the Pacific coast. While in Sacramento, Chris gained national attention by sending a series of prank phone calls made to O. J. Simpson to the popular Opie and Anthony and Howard Stern nationally syndicated shows and Thomas Kitajima eventually joined the show in Sacramento.

In the fall of 2002, KiddChris took a hiatus from radio and retired to upstate New York. There, he rejuvenated himself and prepared for his return, which occurred on the morning of January 5, 2004, in San Antonio, Texas. He hosted a highly rated show at San Antonio's KSRX K-Rock until early August 2005.

== Philadelphia developments ==
KiddChris signed with Philadelphia rock station WYSP and The KiddChris Show began broadcasting on Monday, August 29, 2005.

On August 21, 2006, it was announced that The KiddChris Show had been syndicated to a rock station in Pittsburgh, Pennsylvania. The show entered syndication on August 28, 2006.

In May 2008, KiddChris was fired over a guest's racist parody song (three months after it was aired.) Also fired was program director John Cook.

== Post Philadelphia developments ==
After Foley's firing, he then hosted his own internet radio show for several months in 2009 until his transfer to KUFO in Portland, Oregon.

KiddChris announced in May 2011 on the Howard Stern Show that he was bringing his morning show to WKLS "Project 9-6-1" in Atlanta.

Project 9-6-1 was discontinued in August 2012.

In October 2012, he began to host mornings at WEBN in Cincinnati. In June 2026, he was laid off from WEBN as part of nationwide downsizing by iHeart Media, with June 24 having been his last day on air.
