= Confederation of New Trade Unions of Slovenia "Independence" =

National trade union center in Slovenia

KNSS "Independence"
- Confederation of New Trade Unions of Slovenia "Independence"
- Konfederacija novih sindikatov Slovenije – Neodvisnost
- Founded: March 1990
- Headquarters: Ljubljana, Slovenia
- Location: Slovenia
- Key people: Drago Lombar, president
- Website: www.knssneodvisnost.si

The Confederation of New Trade Unions of Slovenia "Independence" (Slovene: Konfederacija novih sindikatov Slovenije - Neodvisnost) (KNSS "Independence") is a national trade union center in Slovenia. It was founded in March 1990.
