= KNSS-FM =

Simulcast of KNSS, Wichita
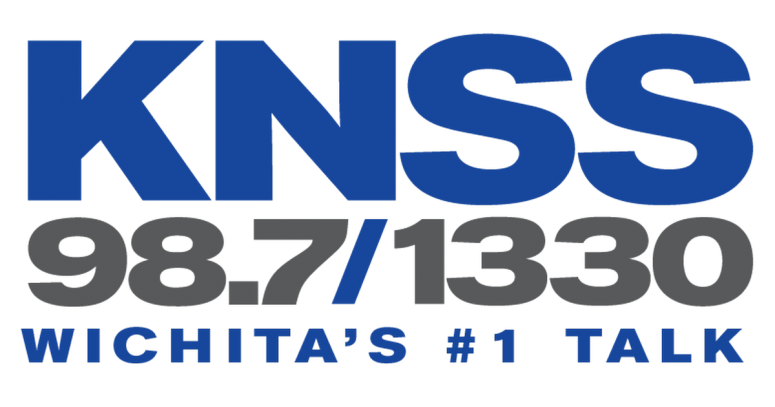
- Clearwater, Kansas; United States
- Broadcast area: Wichita metropolitan area
- Frequency: 98.7 MHz (HD Radio)
- RDS: KNSS
- Branding: 98.7 and 1330 KNSS

Programming
- Format: News/Talk
- Subchannels: HD2: Sports radio (KFH); HD3: Sports gambling (BetMGM Network)
- Network: Fox News Radio
- Affiliations: KWCH-DT; Premiere Networks; Radio America; Westwood One; Kansas City Chiefs

Ownership
- Owner: Audacy, Inc.; (Audacy License, LLC)
- Sister stations: KDGS; KEYN-FM; KFBZ; KFH; KNSS

History
- First air date: July 4, 1995; 31 years ago
- Former call signs: KSQB (1992–1993); KSPG (1993–2000); KAYY (2000); KWSJ-FM (2000–2002); KFH-FM (2002–2016)
- Call sign meaning: "Kansas" and "news station"

Technical information
- Licensing authority: FCC
- Facility ID: 23292
- Class: C2
- ERP: 50,000 watts
- HAAT: 150 meters (490 ft)
- Transmitter coordinates: 37°24′11.1″N 97°35′23.2″W

Links
- Public license information: Public file; LMS
- Webcast: Listen live (via Audacy)
- Website: www.audacy.com/knss

KNSS-FM (98.7 MHz, "98.7 and 1330") is a commercial radio station licensed to Clearwater, Kansas, and serving the Wichita metropolitan area. It simulcasts a news/talk radio format with sister station KNSS (1330 AM). It is owned by Audacy with studios and offices on East Douglas Avenue in Wichita.

KNSS-FM has an effective radiated power of 50,000 watts, and its transmitter is on West 100th Avenue North at North Chicaskia Road in Conway Springs, Kansas. KNSS-FM broadcasts in the HD Radio hybrid format. Its HD2 subchannel carries the sports radio format heard on co-owned KFH (1240 AM) and its HD3 subchannel airs the national BetMGM Network along with some Westwood One Sports programming.

== Programming ==
Weekdays on KNSS-AM-FM begin with Steve & Ted, a news and interview show featuring Steve McIntosh and Ted Woodward. The rest of the schedule is made up of nationally syndicated conservative talk shows: The Glenn Beck Radio Program, The Dana Loesch Show, The Sean Hannity Show, The Mark Levin Show, Armstrong & Getty and Coast to Coast AM with George Noory.

Weekends feature shows on money, health, retirement, gardening, food and wine, some of which are paid brokered programming. Weekend syndicated shows include: Handel on The Law with Bill Handel, The Larry Kudlow Show, Our American Stories with Lee Habeeb and Sunday Nights with Bill Cunningham as well as repeats of weekday shows. Most hours begin with world and national news from Fox News Radio. During NFL football season, KNSS-AM-FM carry Kansas City Chiefs broadcasts.

== History ==
Radio professional Gary Violet was issued a construction permit by the Federal Communications Commission (FCC) on March 27, 1992. It was for a new FM station at 98.7 MHz, with KQSB as its call sign. After three years of getting it built, the station signed on the air on July 4, 1995. It played country music as KSPG, "The Kansas Pig". The station was initially owned by former KBUZ owner Gary Violet. Wichita-based Great Empire Broadcasting (owners of country formatted KFDI (AM) and FM) would provide sales and marketing for the station.

On May 19, 1997, KSPG flipped to hot adult contemporary as KAYY, "K98.7". Entercom (forerunner to current owner Audacy) bought the station in February 2000. The Hot AC format lasted three years.

On May 31, 2000, KAYY became the new home of smooth jazz-formatted KWSJ. The format was moved from its temporary frequency at 92.7 FM (now KGHF) and was originally on 105.3 FM (now KFBZ). The station played contemporary jazz instrumentals with a few vocals each hour from pop and R&B artists.

KWSJ's smooth jazz format was dropped on March 25, 2002, and flipped to a simulcast with AM sister station KFH and its talk radio format. KWSJ changed its call letters to KFH-FM, which were formerly used on 97.9 FM (now KRBB).

On May 9, 2011, KFH-AM-FM flipped from all-talk to sports radio. The stations aired a few weekday local sports shows with CBS Sports Radio filling other hours of the schedule. During the summer of 2016, KFH began simulcasting on FM translator K248CY (97.5 FM), enabling the station to be heard on three separate frequencies (97.5 FM, 98.7 FM and 1240 AM). The signal was strongest in the eastern part of the Wichita metropolitan area.

Entercom announced in October 2016 that the FM station's format would change. Talk station KNSS 1330 AM would begin simulcasting on the 98.7 frequency. That gave Wichita its first full-power FM news/talk station since KFH's 2011 switch to sports. In 2021, Entercom changed its name to Audacy, Inc.
