= KCFN =

American Family Radio station in Wichita, Kansas

- Wichita, Kansas; United States
- Broadcast area: Wichita
- Frequency: 91.1 MHz

Programming
- Format: Conservative Christian radio
- Affiliations: American Family Radio

Ownership
- Owner: American Family Association

History
- First air date: April 23, 1978
- Former call signs: KDSA (1978–1982); KSOF (1982–1992); KZZD (1992–1993)

Technical information
- Licensing authority: FCC
- Facility ID: 1692
- Class: C1
- ERP: 100,000 watts
- HAAT: 148 meters (486 ft)
- Transmitter coordinates: 38°1′9.00″N 97°23′1.00″W

Links
- Public license information: Public file; LMS
- Webcast: Listen live
- Website: afr.net

KCFN (91.1 FM) is a radio station broadcasting a Conservative Christian radio format. Licensed to Wichita, Kansas, United States, the station serves the Wichita area. The station is owned by American Family Association and is an affiliate of American Family Radio.

== History ==
The station's history traces back to a religious organization named The Defenders of the Christian Faith Inc., founded in 1925 by Wichita evangelist Gerald Winrod. The organization has been previously described by critics as "anti-semitic" and "racist". However, under Hart Reid Armstrong's ownership in the 1970s, the image of the organization has changed, with the slogan being "serving where needed". The Defenders of the Christian Faith also held retirement homes in Wichita, Kansas City (Missouri), Rogers (Arkansas), Harrison (Arkansas), Beatrice (Nebraska), and McCook (Nebraska). The organization planned on having an FM radio station, hoping to be on air by early 1978.

In December 1977, the Defenders of the Christian Faith began construction of a 5,000 watt, non-commercial FM radio station on the 11th floor of the Lassen Hotel in Wichita, Kansas, the same building previously used by 1330 KFH (now KNSS). The station initially broadcast from 11 am to 11 pm, although it planned to expand hours into 6 am to midnight. KDSA aired programming previously heard during the Golden Age of Radio, and also a variety format including jazz, band music, and religious programming. One of KDSA's slogans was "A Great Step Backward".

In February 1981, a fire damaged their transmitting antenna, putting the station off the air for months. All other equipment was checked and was found to still be in good condition. The Defenders of the Christian Faith sold their property in April 1981.

In July 1981, Friends University signed a contract to acquire the former KDSA 91.1. The future station chose to broadcast from the outskirts of Wichita instead of within downtown due to known interference issues. Proposed call letters were KFUR (Friends University Radio), KFUW (Friends University of Wichita), and two or three other unspecified call letters, but it was eventually settled on KSOF, for "Sound of Friends". The new station originally planned to go on air by April, but due to awaiting of FCC approval and completion of new facilities, it was delayed. KSOF broadcast fine arts programming, including classical music, and a few local news broadcasts. KSOF's transmission tower was near 61st and North Hillside, broadcasting with 14,500 watts of power.

Due to financial issues, KSOF planned to cease operations by July 31, 1991. Friends University sold its equipment and license of KSOF to New Life Fellowship, Inc. which previously operated KZZD 90.7 (now KYWA with the WayFM brand). The KZZD call sign would betransferred to the 91.1 frequency once the sale was completed. KSOF continued to operate at a reduced schedule until the sale was completed. The FCC approved the transfer of KSOF's license to New Life Fellowship in April 1992. 91.1 would broadcast the Christian Contemporary format of KZZD carried over from 90.7.

In 1993, the call letters were changed to KCFN, and the station simulcast the content of Kingman-based radio station KTCM (now KNZS in Arlington, a commercial classic rock station) owned by New Life Fellowship. In April 1994, the station was sold to the American Family Association, alongside Topeka-based station KBUZ, without notifying New Life Fellowship of a bond offer; programming from American Family Radio is broadcast on this station to this day.
