= KGHF (FM) =

Coordinates: 37.336°N 97.465°W

- Belle Plaine, Kansas; United States
- Broadcast area: Wichita, Kansas
- Frequency: 99.7 MHz (HD Radio)
- Branding: 99.7 Hank FM

Programming
- Format: Classic country
- Subchannels: HD2: Regional Mexican ("La Raza"); HD3: KGSO; HD4: KQAM

Ownership
- Owner: Steckline Communications, Inc.
- Sister stations: KGSO, KQAM

History
- First air date: March 4, 1996 (as KANR at 92.7)
- Former call signs: KUOY (1993–1994); KSNS (1994); KANR (1994–2013); KHLT-FM (2013–2022)
- Former frequencies: 92.7 MHz (1994–2011)
- Call sign meaning: KGSO's Hank FM

Technical information
- Licensing authority: FCC
- Facility ID: 15410
- Class: C2
- ERP: 50,000 watts
- HAAT: 147 meters
- Translator: HD2: 102.5 K273CX (Wichita)

Links
- Public license information: Public file; LMS

KGHF (99.7 FM) is an American radio station broadcasting a classic country format in Wichita, Kansas. The station is licensed to Belle Plaine, Kansas.

KGHF broadcasts in the HD Radio format; the station's HD2 sub-channel airs a Regional Mexican format branded as "La Raza" (which is also heard on 250 watt FM translator K273CX at 102.5 MHz), while its HD3 and HD4 sub-channels carry simulcasts of KGSO and KQAM, respectively.

== History ==
KGHF was first issued a construction permit for 92.7 FM on February 10, 1993, issued as KUOY. Under the ownership of Daniel D. Smith, the station signed on as an All-News station on March 4, 1996 under the call sign KANR, and has been the only station in Wichita providing that format. On March 15, 2000, it became the temporary home to Smooth Jazz-formatted KWSJ, which was formerly located on 105.3 FM (now Hot AC KFBZ). On May 31, 2000, KWSJ would relocate yet again, this time to 98.7 FM (now KNSS-FM). KANR would flip to Rhythmic Top 40 as "Fly 92.7" to compete against Rhythmic KDGS "Power 93.9", whose studios were located in the same shopping center and office complex at 21st Street North and North Woodlawn Avenue in Wichita. Former KDGS personality Christopher "Kidd Chris" Foley was also a DJ on KANR until he took a job offer in Sacramento, California (he is now at WEBN in Cincinnati). A year later, the station flipped to Alternative. Despite the signal's moderate to poor coverage over Wichita, KANR had a large following of listeners with its Alternative format. On August 24, 2006, KANR announced they would change formats to Regional Mexican, branded as "Fiesta 92.7", on September 1. The Wichita market was without an alternative station until August 29, 2014, when KTHR dropped classic rock.

On December 21, 2011, KANR moved from 92.7 to 99.7 FM.

In March 2013, Daniel D. Smith sold the station to Air Capitol Media Group, LLC for $2 million; the transaction was consummated on June 28, 2013. On April 1, Air Capitol registered various domains under the name "Lite", as well as "Wichitas997.com", signaling that the "Fiesta" format will come to an end by May 1, when Air Capitol takes over the station via a Time Brokerage Agreement. It was also hinted by the Wichita Eagle that Brett Harris, formerly of KRBB, would be a part of the new station when his non-compete clause expires that summer.

On May 1, 2013, at Midnight, KANR officially flipped to adult contemporary, branded as "99.7 Lite FM" under the new KHLT-FM call letters. The first song on "Lite" was "It's My Life" by No Doubt.

"La Raza" logo (2015–2022)

On July 29, 2015, Air Capitol Media Group announced that the station would be sold back to Daniel D. Smith, per FCC approval. The station went jockless following the announcement. On August 17, at Midnight, the station went silent. Three days later, on August 20, the station signed back on and returned to Spanish, this time with a Regional Mexican format, branded as "La Raza 99.7." The sale was consummated on October 26, 2015, at a purchase price of $1,420,717.60; most of the price represented forgiveness of debt still owed from Air Capitol's 2013 purchase of the station.

On March 2, 2016, KHLT-FM was sold to La Raza, LLC for $1.65 million.

On March 30, 2022, La Raza announced the sale of KHLT-FM to Steckline Communications. As part of the $1.4 million sale, Steckline took over the station via a Time Brokerage Agreement on April 1, and the station's existing airstaff was dismissed. On May 20, the Regional Mexican format and "La Raza" branding moved to KHLT-FM's HD2 sub-channel and translator K273CX (102.5 FM). The stations simulcasted until May 31, when KHLT-FM flipped to classic country as "99.7 Hank FM". On July 1, the sale to Steckline was consummated. The same day, KHLT-FM changed call letters to KGHF to match the "Hank" branding, although the FCC did not make the change effective until September 7.
