= KNSS (AM) =

News/talk radio station in Wichita, Kansas

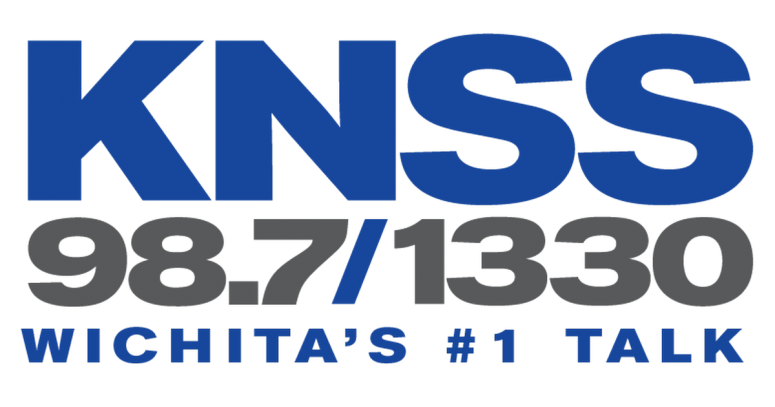
- Wichita, Kansas; United States
- Broadcast area: Wichita metropolitan area
- Frequency: 1330 KHz
- Branding: 98.7 and 1330 KNSS

Programming
- Language: English
- Format: News/talk
- Network: Fox News Radio
- Affiliations: KWCH-DT; Premiere Networks; Radio America; Westwood One; Kansas City Chiefs

Ownership
- Owner: Audacy, Inc.; (Audacy License, LLC)
- Sister stations: KDGS; KEYN-FM; KFBZ; KFH; KNSS-FM

History
- First air date: May 26, 1922; 104 years ago
- Former call signs: WEAH (1922–25); KFH (1925–2004)
- Former frequencies: 1120 kHz (1927); 1220 kHz (1927–1928); 1300 kHz (1928–1941)
- Call sign meaning: "Kansas" and "news station"

Technical information
- Licensing authority: FCC
- Facility ID: 53152
- Class: B
- Power: 5,000 watts
- Transmitter coordinates: 37°42′47.1″N 97°14′52.2″W
- Repeater: 98.7 KNSS-FM (Clearwater)

Links
- Public license information: Public file; LMS
- Webcast: Listen live (via Audacy)
- Website: www.audacy.com/knss

KNSS (1330 kHz, "98.7 and 1330") is a commercial AM radio station in Wichita, Kansas, owned by Audacy, Inc. It simulcasts a news/talk radio format with sister station KNSS-FM 98.7 MHz. The studios and offices are on East Douglas Avenue in Wichita.

KNSS is powered at 5,000 watts. At night, to protect other stations on 1330 AM, it uses a directional antenna. The transmitter is off North Rock Road in the Rockhurst neighborhood of Wichita.

== Programming ==
Weekdays on KNSS-AM-FM begin with Steve & Ted, a news and interview show featuring Steve McIntosh and Ted Woodward. The rest of the schedule is made up of nationally syndicated conservative talk shows: The Glenn Beck Radio Program, The Dana Loesch Show, The Sean Hannity Show, The Mark Levin Show, Armstrong & Getty and Coast to Coast AM with George Noory.

Weekends feature shows on money, health, retirement, gardening, food and wine, some of which are paid brokered programming. Weekend syndicated shows include: Handel on The Law with Bill Handel, The Larry Kudlow Show, Our American Stories with Lee Habeeb and Sunday Nights with Bill Cunningham as well as repeats of weekday shows. Most hours begin with world and national news from Fox News Radio. During NFL football season, KNSS-AM-FM carry Kansas City Chiefs broadcasts.

== History ==
(For a history of the 1240 AM signal, see KFH.)

=== Early years ===
KNSS presently operates from one the oldest radio facilities in Kansas. It first signing on the air on May 26, 1922, although it began experimental broadcasts in March 1922. Its call sign was originally WEAH. The call letters were randomly assigned from a sequential roster of available call signs.

On June 23, 1923, the station was sold to the Wichita Board of Trade. During a period of nearly two years, the Rigby Gray Hotel Company Corporation (operator of the Lassen Hotel) gradually took over the ownership, with the final sale taking place on April 30, 1925. The hotel company changed the call letters to KFH, standing for "Kansas' Finest Hotel". At 9:45 am, February 14, 1926, the first radio broadcast under the call letters KFH was made. The Wichita Eagle, a local newspaper, purchased 50% of KFH on October 1, 1929.

KFH became a Columbia Broadcasting System (CBS) network affiliate on October 8, 1929. KFH carried the CBS line up of dramas, comedies, news, sports, soap operas, game shows and big band broadcasts during the "Golden Age of Radio". In the 1930s, it began broadcasting on 1300 kHz with 1,000 watts.

=== Power boost ===
The Federal Communications Commission (FCC) authorized an increase in daytime power to 5,000 watts on May 28, 1935. In 1941, with the enactment of the North American Regional Broadcasting Agreement (NARBA), the station switched to its present-day frequency of 1330 kHz.

Ownership remained under the control of the hotel company until June 5, 1963, when the FCC approved the transfer of the station license to Aeschlayer & Reynolds of Dallas, Texas. The new owner retained the station for less than five and a half years and sold KFH to Phil and Nancy Kassebaum, operating under the corporate name "KFH Radio, Inc." on November 1, 1968. (Nancy Kassebaum was elected to the U.S. Senate in 1978.) By this time, KFH shifted to an easy listening/beautiful music format.

=== Country and oldies ===
On September 13, 1978, KFH flipped from its longtime MOR format to country; during this time, the station was an affiliate Wichita Wings soccer games. In 1988, the Kassebaums sold the station to Midcontinent Broadcasting; on October 19 of that year, KFH flipped to a simulcast of new station KXLK (105.3 FM), then flipped to oldies the following March. On July 26, 1993, KFH flipped to news/talk.

On July 1, 1994, Midcontinent sold KFH to Pourtales Radio Partnership. Pourtales did not retain ownership very long; the company signed a letter of intent to sell KFH to Triathlon Broadcasting on Friday, March 24, 1995, and completed the sale on June 2, 1995. The station was in turn sold to Entercom (now Audacy) on February 23, 2000.

=== All talk ===
KFH carried a talk radio format from 1993 until 2002, when it shifted most of its political talk shows to KNSS, and shifted to a hot talk format. Also that year, KFH added a simulcast on 98.7 FM, displacing smooth jazz KWSJ. The FM station switched its call sign to KFH-FM.

On August 30, 2004, KFH and KNSS swapped facilities. The KFH call sign and hot talk format moved to AM 1240; concurrently, KNSS and its news/talk format moved to AM 1330. Entercom wanted to place KNSS on a stronger signal; AM 1330 operates at 5,000 watts around the clock while AM 1240 only operated at 1,000 watts.

The station's studios were originally located at North Woodlawn and East 21st in Northeast Wichita. On May 20, 2015, the studios moved to the Ruffin Building at 9111 East Douglas, formerly the Pizza Hut corporate headquarters.

KNSS began simulcasting on KNSS-FM (98.7) on October 12, 2016. Prior to then, the 98.7 frequency was KFH-FM, a simulcast of KFH. KFH-AM-FM were network affiliates of ESPN Radio. KFH continues as a sports radio station on its own, now with an FM translator station at 97.5 MHz.

== See also ==
- List of initial AM-band station grants in the United States
