= KYUL =

- Scott City, Kansas; United States
- Frequency: 1310 kHz
- Branding: Newsradio 1310

Programming
- Format: News Talk Information
- Affiliations: ESPN Radio, Fox News Radio, Westwood One

Ownership
- Owner: Steckline Communications
- Sister stations: KIUL

Technical information
- Licensing authority: FCC
- Facility ID: 71854
- Class: D
- Power: 500 watts day 147 watts night
- Transmitter coordinates: 38°31′35″N 100°54′42″W
- Translator: (98.5 MHz) K253CW (Scott City)

Links
- Public license information: Public file; LMS
- Webcast: Listen live
- Website: Official website

KYUL (1310 AM) is a radio station broadcasting a News Talk Information format. Licensed to Scott City, Kansas, United States, the station is currently owned by Steckline Communications and features programming from ESPN Radio, Fox News Radio and Westwood One. It simulcasts most of the programming of sister station KIUL, Garden City.

Prior to Steckline's acquisition, KYUL's call letters were KFLA. Before it and KIUL were spun off from Western Kansas Broadcasting, KFLA was a sister station to Cool 94, an FM station licensed to Scott City.
