= KGYN =

Radio station in Guymon, Oklahoma

- Guymon, Oklahoma; United States
- Broadcast area: Oklahoma Panhandle and surrounding areas in Texas, Kansas, New Mexico, and Colorado
- Frequency: 1210 kHz
- Branding: The Five State Big Talker

Programming
- Format: Talk
- Affiliations: Fox News Radio; Fox Sports Radio; Compass Media Networks; Premiere Networks; Westwood One

Ownership
- Owner: Steckline Communications, Inc.

History
- First air date: 1949; 77 years ago
- Former frequencies: 1220 kHz (1949–1971)
- Call sign meaning: Guymon

Technical information
- Licensing authority: FCC
- Facility ID: 65152
- Class: B
- Power: 22,000 watts day; 10,000 watts night
- Transmitter coordinates: 36°40′34″N 101°22′58″W
- Translator: 106.3 K292HJ (Liberal, Kansas)

Links
- Public license information: Public file; LMS
- Website: KGYN Online

KGYN (1210 AM) is a radio station licensed to Guymon, Oklahoma, United States. The station serves the southwestern Kansas area, and carries a talk format. The station is currently owned by Steckline Communications. KGYN broadcasts with 22,000 watts on a protected signal and can be heard in 7 states during daytime power and 10,000 watts in most of the western half of the United States during night time power.

The station uses the slogan "The Five State Big talker."

The station has been received via skywave in Salt Lake City, Utah.

On June 2, 2020, KGYN was granted an FCC construction permit to increase day power to 22,000 watts.

Logo before translator sign on
