= KIUL =

Radio station in Kansas, United States

- Garden City, Kansas; United States
- Broadcast area: Southwestern Kansas
- Frequency: 1240 kHz
- Branding: 1240 NEWS RADIO 1310

Programming
- Format: News Talk Information
- Affiliations: ESPN Radio, Fox News Radio, Premiere Radio Networks, Westwood One

Ownership
- Owner: Steckline Communications
- Sister stations: KYUL

Technical information
- Licensing authority: FCC
- Facility ID: 67041
- Class: C
- Power: 1,000 watts unlimited
- Transmitter coordinates: 37°59′52″N 100°54′25″W
- Translators: K285HE (104.9 MHz, Garden City)
- Repeater: 1310 kHz (KYUL)

Links
- Public license information: Public file; LMS
- Webcast: Listen live
- Website: Official website

KIUL (1240 AM) is a radio station broadcasting a News Talk Information format. Licensed to Garden City, Kansas, United States, the station serves southwestern Kansas. The station is currently owned by Steckline Communications and features programming from ESPN Radio, Fox News Radio, Premiere Radio Networks, and Westwood One.

Most of KIUL's programming is simulcast on KYUL, 1310 AM, in Scott City, Kansas. Prior to Steckline's acquisition, KYUL's call sign was KFLA.

== History ==
KIUL was first authorized in 1935. The call sign was randomly assigned from an alphabetical list of available call letters.

In October 1947, the Federal Communications Commission approved the sale of KIUL by Frank D. Conard to The Telegram Publishing Company for $42,000.
