= KTLI =

Coordinates: 37.939°N 96.989°W

- El Dorado, Kansas; United States
- Broadcast area: Wichita
- Frequency: 99.1 MHz

Programming
- Format: Contemporary Christian
- Network: K-Love

Ownership
- Owner: Educational Media Foundation; (El Dorado Licenses, Inc.)

History
- First air date: February 15, 1972
- Former call signs: KOYY-FM (1972–1984); KSPG-FM (1984–1988); KBUZ (1988–1993)
- Former frequencies: 99.3 MHz (1972–1988)
- Call sign meaning: Station was known as "The Light"

Technical information
- Licensing authority: FCC
- Class: C1
- ERP: 100,000 watts
- HAAT: 188 meters (617 ft)
- Translator: 93.9 K230BP (Hutchinson)

Links
- Public license information: Public file; LMS
- Website: http://www.klove.com/

KTLI (99.1 FM) is a radio station in Wichita, Kansas, and licensed to El Dorado, Kansas. The station airs the K-LOVE Contemporary Christian programming from the Educational Media Foundation. El Dorado Licenses is a wholly owned subsidiary of EMF. KTLI's transmitter is located near Potwin, Kansas.

== History ==
KTLI signed on the air in 1972 at 99.3 FM. Its format history includes rock and adult contemporary as KOYY and country as KSPG-FM.

In February 1988, Gary and Ann Violet purchased KSPG-FM along with KSPG-AM (1360). The country format was dropped on the FM side for urban contemporary as the second incarnation of KBUZ (formerly on 106.5 FM, now KYQQ), targeting Wichita, despite its (at the time) poor signal. In the fall of 1989, KBUZ upgraded its signal for better coverage over Wichita; the power increased from 3 kW to 50 kW, and relocated its transmitter to a site near Towanda. Along with an increase in its power, the station changed frequencies from 99.3 to 99.1. The format leaned slightly towards a rhythmic Top 40 direction for a brief period and later moved back to an urban direction.

In December 1991, the Violets once again sold KBUZ along with KSPG-AM, this time to New Life Fellowship Inc., whose principal was local pastor David Brace. At Midnight on December 6, the new owners dropped KBUZ's urban format again, and changed to contemporary Christian as "Light 99" (the KTLI call letters would be adopted on January 12, 1993). In December 1995, Brace was convicted on federal money laundering charges; because of this, KTLI was sold off in bankruptcy court to Adonai Radio Group.

In June 2004, Adonai Radio Group announced they would sell KTLI to Educational Media Foundation (EMF), at the time based in Sacramento. Since the completion of the sale in October 2004, KTLI has aired EMF's "K-LOVE" contemporary Christian music format.
