= Clearwater, Kansas =

City in Sedgwick County, Kansas

- City
- Typical windmill street sign found throughout Clearwater

- Location within Sedgwick County and Kansas

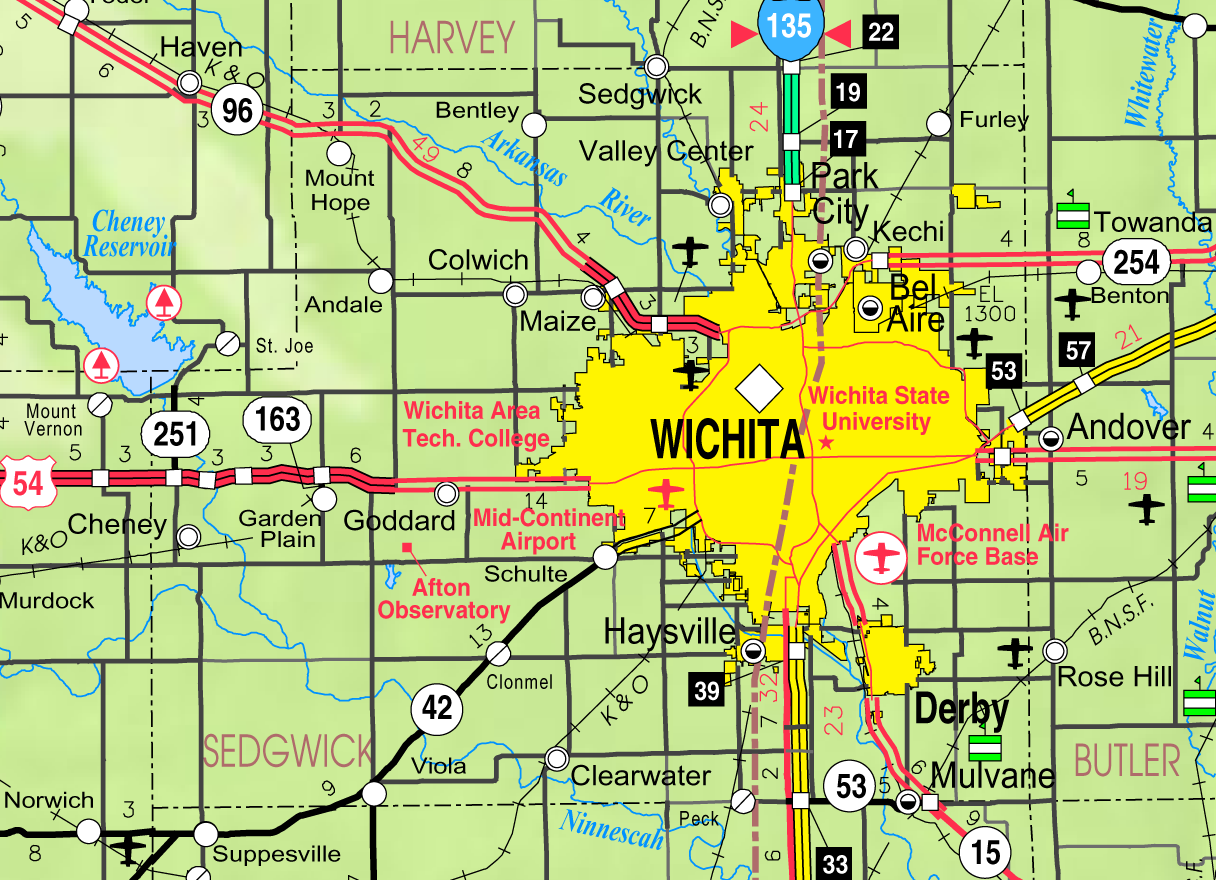
- KDOT map of Sedgwick County (legend)
- Coordinates: 37°30′20″N 97°30′5″W
- Country: United States
- State: Kansas
- County: Sedgwick
- Founded: 1870
- Platted: 1872
- Incorporated: 1885
- Named for: Water (Ninnescah River)

Government
  - Type: Mayor–Council
  - Mayor: Burt Ussery

Area
  - Total: 1.94 sq mi (5.02 km^{2})
  - Land: 1.94 sq mi (5.02 km^{2})
  - Water: 0 sq mi (0.00 km^{2})
- Elevation: 1,286 ft (392 m)

Population (2020)
  - Total: 2,653
  - Density: 1,370/sq mi (528/km^{2})
- Time zone: UTC-6 (CST)
  - Summer (DST): UTC-5 (CDT)
- ZIP Code: 67026
- Area code: 620
- FIPS code: 20-13925
- GNIS ID: 474315
- Website: clearwaterks.org

Clearwater is a city in Sedgwick County, Kansas, United States. As of the 2020 census, the population of the city was 2,653.

== History ==
Clearwater was settled in 1870, and platted as a city in 1872. The community was named after the Ninnescah River that runs west and south of it. The name "Ninnescah" comes from the Osage Indian language, where "Ninne" means water and "scah" can mean clear, salt, spring, good, or white water. The first post office in Clearwater was established in 1871, and the name of the post office was officially spelled out Clear Water until 1894. The Chisholm Trail ran along the eastern side of the community from 1867 to 1871.

== Geography ==
Clearwater is located just southwest of Wichita. According to the United States Census Bureau, the city has a total area of 1.87 square miles (4.84 km^{2}), all land.

== Demographics ==
Historical population
| Census | Pop. | Note | %± |
|---|---|---|---|
| 1890 | 408 | | — |
| 1900 | 368 | | −9.8% |
| 1910 | 569 | | 54.6% |
| 1920 | 647 | | 13.7% |
| 1930 | 669 | | 3.4% |
| 1940 | 591 | | −11.7% |
| 1950 | 647 | | 9.5% |
| 1960 | 1,073 | | 65.8% |
| 1970 | 1,435 | | 33.7% |
| 1980 | 1,684 | | 17.4% |
| 1990 | 1,875 | | 11.3% |
| 2000 | 2,178 | | 16.2% |
| 2010 | 2,481 | | 13.9% |
| 2020 | 2,653 | | 6.9% |
U.S. Decennial Census

=== 2020 census ===
As of the 2020 census, Clearwater had a population of 2,653, with 934 households and 689 families. The population density was 1,369.6 per square mile (528.8/km^{2}). There were 985 housing units at an average density of 508.5 units per square mile (196.3 units/km^{2}).

The median age was 35.8 years. 30.1% of residents were under the age of 18 and 16.9% were 65 years of age or older. For every 100 females there were 92.5 males, and for every 100 females age 18 and over there were 87.5 males age 18 and over.

There were 934 households, of which 41.8% had children under the age of 18 living in them. Of all households, 56.9% were married-couple households, 13.6% were households with a male householder and no spouse or partner present, and 24.3% were households with a female householder and no spouse or partner present. About 21.6% of all households were made up of individuals and 11.7% had someone living alone who was 65 years of age or older. There were 985 housing units, of which 5.2% were vacant. The homeowner vacancy rate was 0.3% and the rental vacancy rate was 8.5%.

0.0% of residents lived in urban areas, while 100.0% lived in rural areas.

Racial composition as of the 2020 census
| Race | Number | Percent |
|---|---|---|
| White | 2,411 | 90.9% |
| Black or African American | 5 | 0.2% |
| American Indian and Alaska Native | 22 | 0.8% |
| Asian | 7 | 0.3% |
| Native Hawaiian and Other Pacific Islander | 0 | 0.0% |
| Some other race | 17 | 0.6% |
| Two or more races | 191 | 7.2% |
| Hispanic or Latino (of any race) | 98 | 3.7% |

=== Demographic estimates ===
The average household size was 2.9 and the average family size was 3.5.

=== Educational attainment ===
The percent of those with a bachelor's degree or higher was estimated to be 17.7% of the population.

=== Income and poverty ===
The 2016–2020 5-year American Community Survey estimates show that the median household income was $73,073 (with a margin of error of +/- $6,251) and the median family income was $84,167 (+/- $10,596). Males had a median income of $48,620 (+/- $5,156) versus $33,269 (+/- $4,364) for females. The median income for those above 16 years old was $39,757 (+/- $5,937). Approximately, 7.8% of families and 9.0% of the population were below the poverty line, including 12.8% of those under the age of 18 and 1.5% of those ages 65 or over.

=== 2010 census ===
As of the census of 2010, there were 2,481 people, 908 households, and 660 families residing in the city. The population density was 1,326.7 inhabitants per square mile (512.2/km^{2}). There were 963 housing units at an average density of 515.0 units per square mile (198.8 units/km^{2}). The racial makeup of the city was 97.2% White, 0.2% African American, 0.3% Native American, 0.3% Asian, 0.3% from other races, and 1.7% from two or more races. Hispanic or Latino of any race were 1.6% of the population.

There were 908 households, of which 40.9% had children under the age of 18 living with them, 56.1% were married couples living together, 11.5% had a female householder with no husband present, 5.2% had a male householder with no wife present, and 27.3% were non-families. 25.3% of all households were made up of individuals, and 14.2% had someone living alone who was 65 years of age or older. The average household size was 2.65 and the average family size was 3.19.

The median age in the city was 35.8 years. 29.6% of residents were under the age of 18; 7.3% were between the ages of 18 and 24; 24.7% were from 25 to 44; 22% were from 45 to 64; and 16.5% were 65 years of age or older. The gender makeup of the city was 47.1% male and 52.9% female.

== Education ==
The community is served by Clearwater USD 264 public school district.

== Notable people ==
- Raymond Goertz, roboticist
- Cara Gorges, 2007 Miss Kansas USA
- Logan Mize, Country Artist
