= Wichita metropolitan area, Kansas =

Metropolitan area in the United States

Wichita metropolitan area Wichita, Kansas Metropolitan Area
- Metropolitan Statistical Area
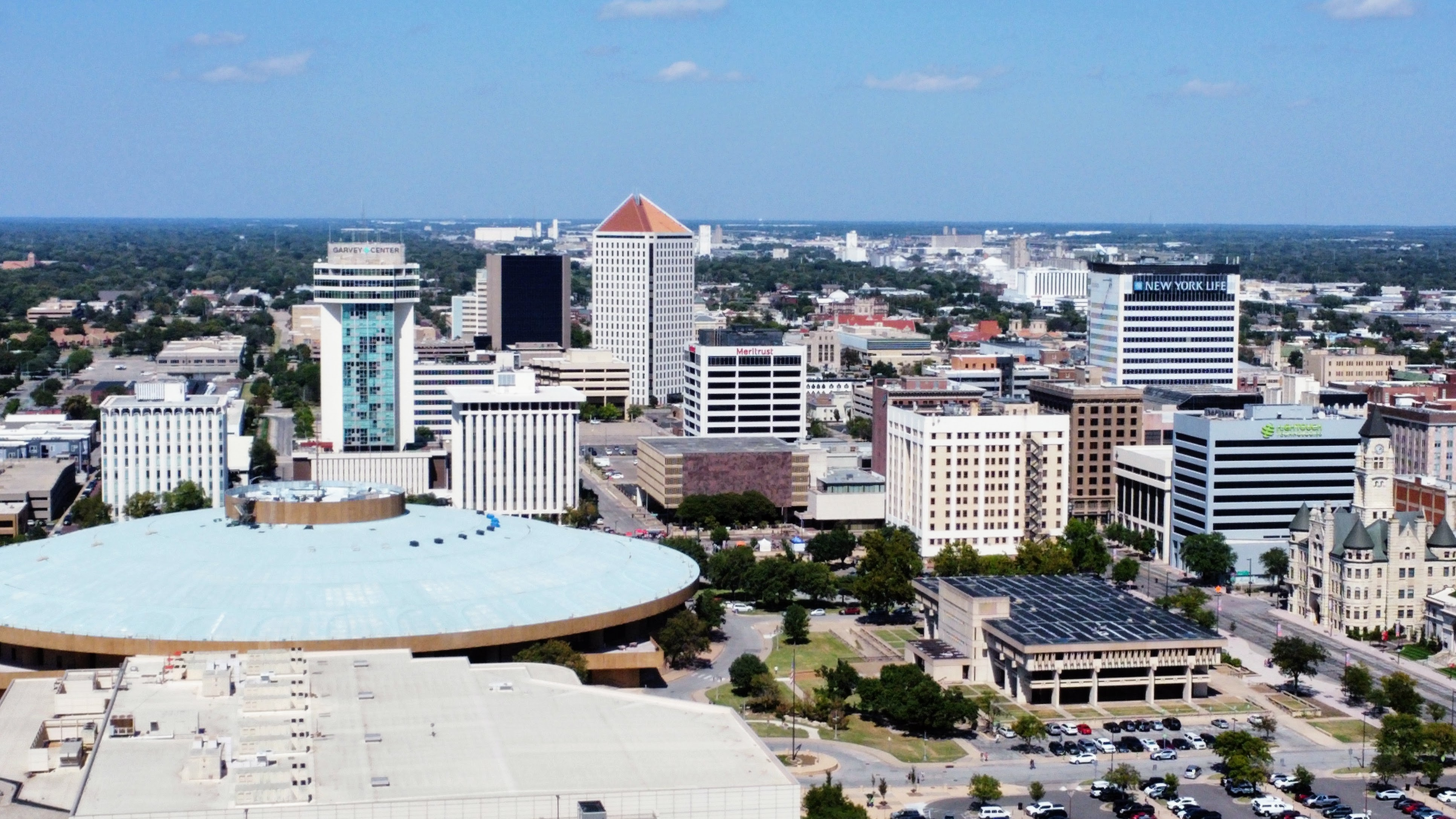
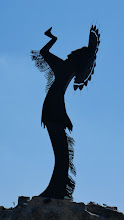
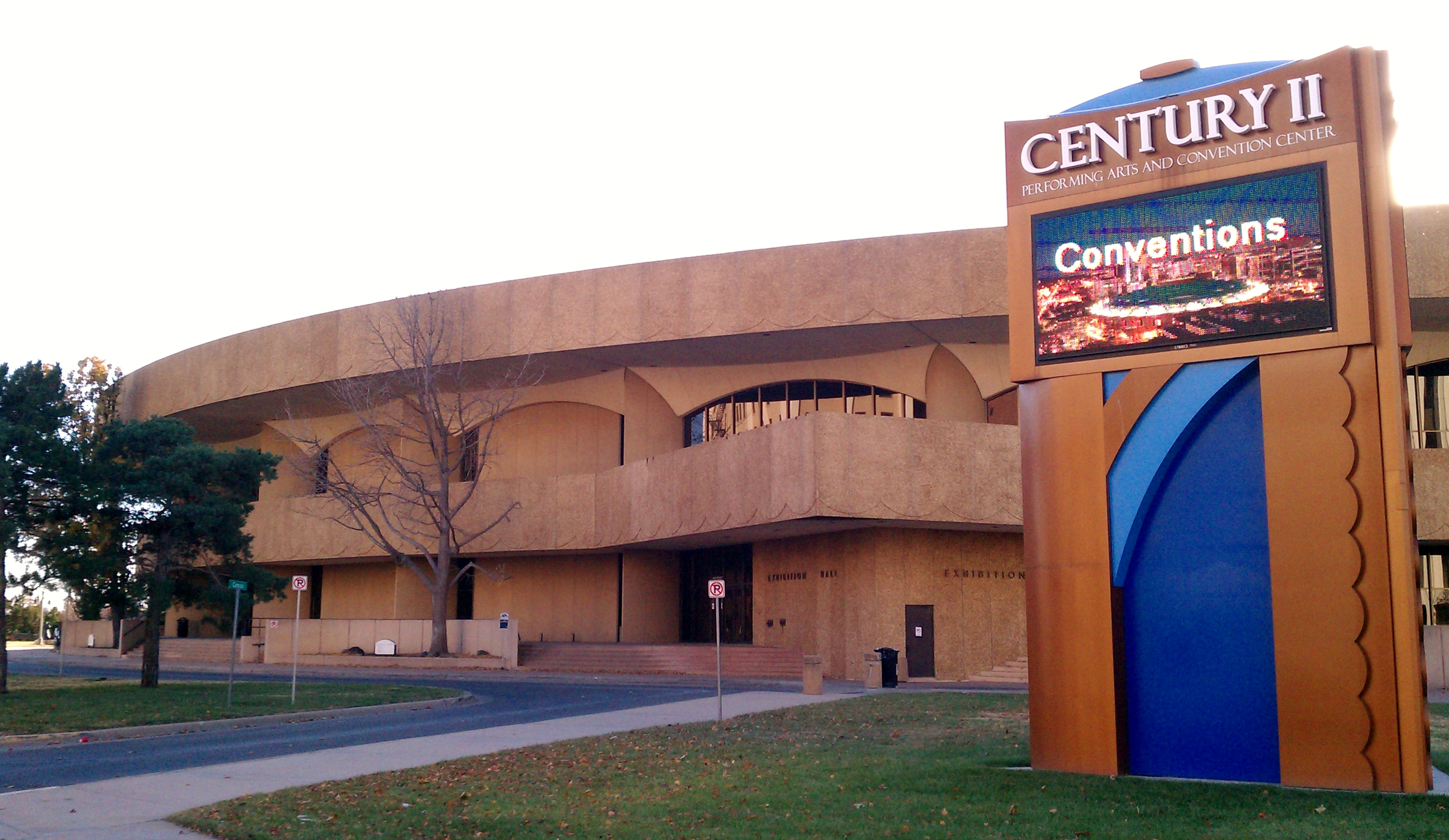
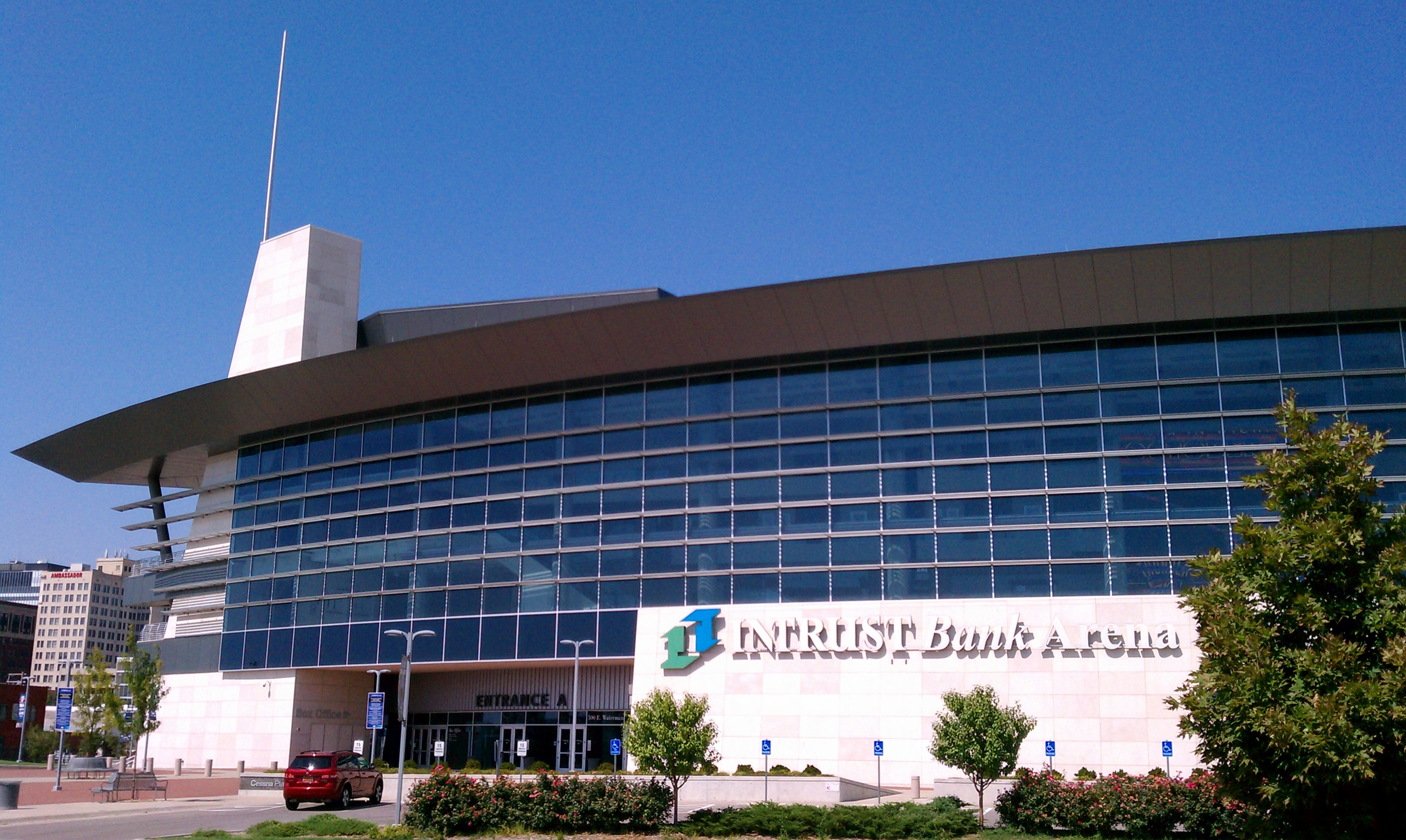
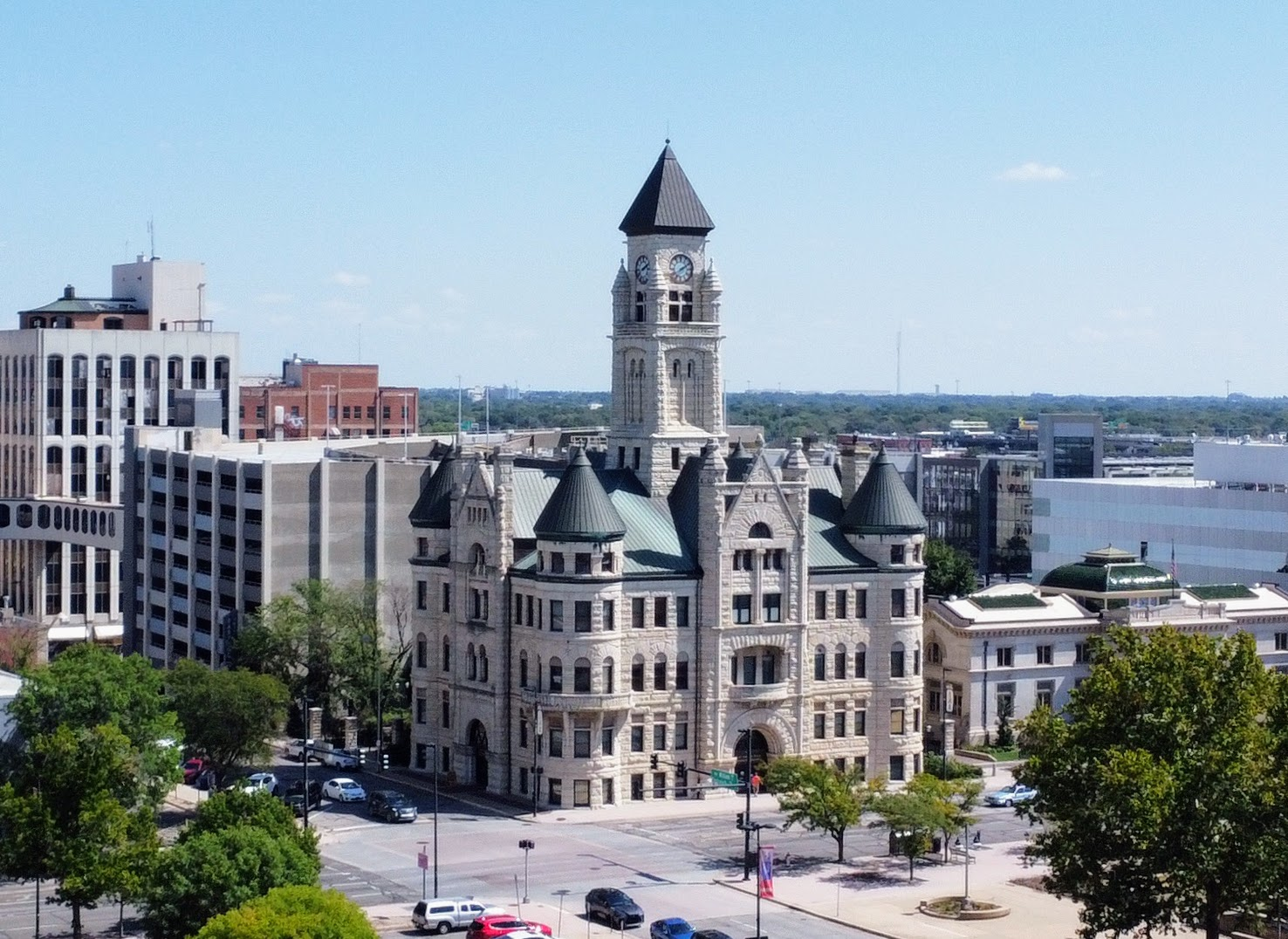
- Downtown Wichita Keeper of the Plains Century II Performing Arts & Convention Center Intrust Bank Arena Historic Wichita City Hall Equity Bank Stadium
Interactive Map of Wichita–Arkansas City–Winfield, KS CSA
City of Wichita
Wichita, KS MSA
Arkansas City–Winfield, KS µSA
- Country: United States
- State: Kansas
- Principal city: Wichita
- Other cities: - Newton; - El Dorado; - Arkansas City; - Winfield

Area
  - Metropolitan Statistical Area: 4,180 sq mi (10,830 km^{2})

Population (2020)
  - Metro: 647,610

GDP
  - Metro: $43.935 billion (2022)
- Time zone: UTC-6 (CST)
  - Summer (DST): UTC-5 (CDT)

The Wichita metropolitan area, officially known as the Wichita, KS Metropolitan Statistical Area, is a metropolitan area in south-central Kansas at the confluence of the Little Arkansas and Arkansas Rivers, anchored by the city of Wichita. The U.S. Census Bureau defines the metropolitan statistical area as consisting of Butler, Harvey, Sedgwick, and Sumner counties. Covering 4,180 square miles (10,390 km^{2}), the population was estimated at 663,809 in 2025, making it the largest metropolitan area anchored in Kansas. However, the bi-state Kansas City metropolitan area, which extends into both Kansas and Missouri, is larger.

Cultural attractions include the Wichita Art Museum, the Ulrich Museum of Art, Exploration Place, the Mid-America All-Indian Museum, Botanica Wichita, the Kansas Aviation Museum, and the Museum of World Treasures. Performing arts venues include Century II Performing Arts & Convention Center, the Orpheum Theatre, the Scottish Rite Temple, and Intrust Bank Arena. Other attractions include the Sedgwick County Zoo, Keeper of the Plains sculpture, Tanganyika Wildlife Park, and the Kansas Sports Hall of Fame.

Historic features include the Old Cowtown Museum, the Douglas Design District, Delano neighborhood, and the Arkansas River crossing marked by the Keeper of the Plains. Historic cultural origins include the city's role as a cattle-shipping center during the late 19th century, early aviation manufacturing, and its contributions to American fast-food franchising, as the founding place of chains such as White Castle, Pizza Hut, and Freddy's Frozen Custard & Steakburgers.

== Geography ==
The Wichita metropolitan area is located in south-central Kansas along the Arkansas River, near its confluence with the Little Arkansas River. The city of Wichita forms the urban core, with development radiating outward into suburban and exurban communities. The metro is generally surrounded by agricultural land, with smaller satellite towns connected by state routes.

Downtown Wichita lies near the geographic center of the city, bordered by the Arkansas River to the west and the historic Delano and Old Town districts. Suburban growth is concentrated in Sedgwick County, and mostly within Wichita.

== Divisions ==
=== Metropolitan Statistical Area ===
The Wichita Metropolitan Statistical Area includes four counties in Kansas; Sedgwick, Butler, Harvey, and Sumner.

County	Seat	2025 estimate	2020 census	Change	Area	Density
Sedgwick	Wichita	538,433	523,824	+2.79%	1,009 sq mi (2,610 km^{2})	534/sq mi (206/km^{2})
Butler	El Dorado	69,484	67,380	+3.12%	1,447 sq mi (3,750 km^{2})	48/sq mi (19/km^{2})
Harvey	Newton	33,580	34,024	−1.30%	541 sq mi (1,400 km^{2})	62/sq mi (24/km^{2})
Sumner	Wellington	22,312	22,382	−0.31%	1,185 sq mi (3,070 km^{2})	19/sq mi (7/km^{2})
Total		663,809	647,610	+2.50%	4,182 sq mi (10,830 km^{2})	159/sq mi (61/km^{2})

=== Communities ===
The following are cities in the Wichita, KS Metropolitan Statistical Area categorized based on the United States Census Bureau 2025 population estimates. No population estimates are released for census-designated places (CDPs), which are marked with an asterisk (*). These places are categorized based on their 2020 Census population.

Principal City

- Wichita (400,987)

Places with 10,000 to 30,000 inhabitants

- Derby (26,606)
- Newton (18,353)
- Andover (17,370)
- El Dorado (12,696)
- Haysville (11,353)
- Bel Aire (10,287)

Places with 1,000 to 9,999 inhabitants

- Park City (9,458)
- Augusta (9,073)
- Maize (7,853)
- Valley Center (7,685)
- Wellington (7,541)
- Mulvane (7,030)
- Goddard (6,638)
- Rose Hill (4,320)
- Hesston (3,458)
- Oaklawn-Sunview* (2,880)
- Clearwater (2,792)
- Kechi (2,375)
- Cheney (2,178)
- Halstead (2,132)
- North Newton (1,791)
- McConnell AFB* (1,636)
- Sedgwick (1,575)
- Douglass (1,506)
- Colwich (1,445)
- Belle Plaine (1,442)
- Towanda (1,426)
- Conway Springs (1,141)
- Oxford (1,038)
- Garden Plain (1,010)
- Caldwell (1,000)

Places with fewer than 1,000 inhabitants

- Benton (939)
- Andale (926)
- Burrton (836)
- Mount Hope (803)
- Eastborough (724)
- Leon (652)
- Whitewater (650)
- Bentley (586)
- Argonia (447)
- Potwin (411)
- South Haven (329)
- Elbing (223)
- Walton (215)
- Peck* (162)
- Geuda Springs (partial) (158)
- Milton* (155)
- Rosalia* (149)
- St. Marks* (124)
- Viola (112)
- Cassoday (107)
- Latham (99)
- Mayfield (71)
- Greenwich* (64)
- Milan (48)
- Hunnewell (47)
- Furley* (39)
- Beaumont* (36)

Unincorporated places

- Bois d'Arc
- Corbin
- Schulte

== Demographics ==
Historical population
Census	Pop.	Note	%±
1900	44,037		—
1910	73,095		66.0%
1920	92,234		26.2%
1930	136,330		47.8%
1940	143,311		5.1%
1950	222,290		55.1%
1960	432,807		94.7%
1970	440,141		1.7%
1980	466,772		6.1%
1990	511,111		9.5%
2000	571,168		11.8%
2010	623,061		9.1%
2020	647,610		3.9%
U.S. Decennial Census

As of the census of 2000, there were 571,166 people, 220,440 households, and 149,768 families residing within the MSA. The racial makeup of the MSA was 82.36% White, 7.51% African American, 1.06% Native American, 2.73% Asian, 0.05% Pacific Islander, 3.67% from other races, and 2.62% from two or more races. Hispanic or Latino of any race were 7.23% of the population.

The median income for a household in the MSA was $42,070, and the median income for a family was $50,202. Males had a median income of $37,025 versus $24,444 for females. The per capita income for the MSA was $19,519.

== Economy ==
In 2024, the Wichita metropolitan area had a GDP of approximately US$46.47 billion, which represents about 20.6% of Kansas's total nominal GDP, making it the second-largest contributor to Kansas's economy.

The metro has long been a center of aircraft manufacturing, earning it the nickname “Air Capital of the World”. Major employers in the region include Spirit AeroSystems, Textron Aviation (Cessna, Beechcraft, and Hawker brands), Koch Industries, Cargill Protein, Ascension Via Christi Health, Wesley Medical Center, and the State of Kansas through education and government offices.

Business enterprises with significant operations in Wichita include Airbus's North American engineering center, Johnson Controls, and Koch. The region's higher education institutions, led by Wichita State University, contribute to aerospace, health care, and technology research.

Retail and commercial centers in the metro include Towne East Square, NewMarket Square, Bradley Fair, and Greenwich Place, as well as the Old Town entertainment district in downtown Wichita.

== Politics ==
Presidential election results in the Wichita metropolitan area generally mirror Kansas's broader political alignment, with Republican candidates receiving consistent majorities. In 2020, Sedgwick County (the core county of the metro) voted 56.4% Republican to 41.5% Democratic, while Butler, Harvey, and Sumner counties delivered even larger Republican margins. Historically, Wichita has leaned Republican in presidential contests, though Democratic support has been somewhat stronger within the city of Wichita itself compared to surrounding suburbs and rural counties.

== Colleges and Universities ==
Top 5 largest colleges by total enrollment (within the MSA)

1. Wichita State University – ~23,000
2. Butler Community College – ~9,000
3. Newman University – ~2,800
4. Friends University – ~1,500
5. Bethel College (North Newton) – ~500

List of institutions (including those in the CSA):

- Bethel College – North Newton
- Butler Community College – El Dorado/Andover/Wichita
- Cowley College – Arkansas City/Winfield
- Friends University – Wichita
- Hutchinson Community College (extension campuses) – Hutchinson/Wichita
- Kansas State University Polytechnic Campus (extension) – Wichita
- Newman University – Wichita
- Southwestern College – Winfield
- Wichita State University – Wichita
- WSU Tech – Wichita

== Libraries ==
The metro public library systems include the Wichita Public Library, the Newton Public Library, the El Dorado Public Library, the Andover Public Library, and the Derby Public Library. Academic libraries in the area include Ablah Library at Wichita State University, the Newman University Library, and the Edmund Stanley Library at Friends University.

== Media ==
=== Print ===
The Wichita Eagle is the metropolitan area's major daily newspaper. Other print outlets include the Wichita Business Journal and several community papers serving surrounding towns. The Sunflower is the student newspaper at Wichita State University.

=== Broadcast ===
The Wichita–Hutchinson Plus television market is the 72nd largest in the United States, encompassing 24 counties in central and southern Kansas.

=== Television ===
All major network affiliates are represented in Wichita, including:

KSNW, channel 3 (NBC)

KAKE, channel 10 (ABC)

KWCH-DT, channel 12 (CBS)

KSCW-DT, channel 33 (The CW)

KSAS-TV, channel 24 (Fox)

KMTW, channel 36 (MyNetworkTV)

KPTS, channel 8 (PBS)

=== Radio ===
Over two dozen AM and FM radio stations broadcast in the Wichita area. Popular commercial stations include KNSS (1330 AM / 98.7 FM) (news/talk), KFDI-FM (101.3) (country), KEYN-FM (103.7) (classic hits), KRBB (97.9) (adult contemporary), and KZCH (96.3) (Top 40). Community and public radio services include KMUW (89.1 FM), the NPR affiliate operated by Wichita State University, and KJRL (105.7 FM), a religious broadcaster. Spanish-language radio outlets such as La Raza 102.5 FM also serve the metro's Hispanic population.

== Combined Statistical Area ==
The Wichita–Arkansas City–Winfield, KS Combined Statistical Area is made up of five counties in south central Kansas. The statistical area includes one metropolitan area and one micropolitan area. As of the 2020 Census, the CSA had a population of 682,159, increasing to an estimated 698,191 in 2025.

Statistical Area	2025 Estimate	2020 Census	Change	Area	Density
Wichita, KS Metropolitan Statistical Area	663,809	647,610	+2.50%	4,182 sq mi (10,830 km^{2})	159/sq mi (61/km^{2})
Arkansas City–Winfield, KS Micropolitan Statistical Area	34,382	34,549	−0.48%	1,132 sq mi (2,930 km^{2})	30/sq mi (12/km^{2})
Total	698,191	682,159	+2.35%	5,314 sq mi (13,760 km^{2})	131/sq mi (51/km^{2})

== Transportation ==
=== Major highways ===
Interstates

- I-35 / Kansas Turnpike – A major north–south route connecting Wichita with Oklahoma City to the south and Topeka and Kansas City to the northeast.
- I-135 – A spur of I-35 running north from Wichita through Newton, Salina, and connecting with I-70.
- I-235 – A bypass loop around the western and northern sides of Wichita, terminating at I-135 in Park City.

U.S. Highways

- US 50 – Crosses the metro east–west north of Wichita.
- US 54 – A major east–west corridor through Wichita, largely forming Kellogg Avenue, a freeway through much of the city.
- US 77 – Runs north–south east of the metro, connecting to El Dorado and Arkansas City.
- US 81 – Runs concurrently with I-135 through Wichita and northward, continuing toward Salina.
- US 160 – Passes east–west through southern Sedgwick County, linking Wellington and Winfield.
- US 166 – Runs east–west south of the metro, connecting Arkansas City with southeast Kansas.
- US 177 – Extends north from Oklahoma into El Dorado, east of the Wichita area.
- US 400 – Overlaps US 54 through Wichita, continuing east toward southeastern Kansas and west toward Dodge City.

Kansas Highways

- K-2 – Southwest of Wichita, running from Harper County toward Anthony and U.S. 160.
- K-14 – Extends north–south west of Wichita, linking Kingman to Hutchinson.
- K-15 – A north–south highway running concurrently with I-135 and U.S. 81 through Wichita, splits from I-135 at Southeast Boulevard, connecting Derby and Newton.
- K-42 - Connects Wichita to the southwest toward Schulte, entering the city as Southwest Boulevard.
- K-44 - Short east–west connector in Harper County, west of the metro.
- K-49 – A north–south connector west of Wellington, between U.S. 81 and K-2.
- K-53 – East–west route south of Wichita, linking Mulvane to Kansas Turnpike.
- K-55 – Runs east–west south of the metro, connecting Belle Plaine and Udall to Kansas Turnpike.
- K-96 – A major diagonal route running northeast–southwest, connects Hutchinson with Wichita and the Kansas Turnpike.
- K-99 – Passes north–south through Butler County, east of the metro, linking El Dorado to Emporia.
- K-177 – A north–south highway east of Wichita, connecting El Dorado to the Flint Hills Scenic Byway.
- K-196 – Runs from K-254 to I-135, linking El Dorado with Newton.
- K-254 – An east–west expressway linking Wichita with El Dorado.

=== Transit ===
- Wichita Transit operates fixed-route bus service and paratransit within the city of Wichita. Most routes follow a hub-and-spoke system centered downtown, with additional circulator and university-oriented services. The system provides basic mobility within the metro, though coverage and frequency are limited compared to larger urban areas.

=== Rail ===
Wichita is a freight hub served by BNSF Railway and Union Pacific, with regional and local switching by lines such as the Kansas & Oklahoma Railroad.

Amtrak service for the metropolitan area is at Newton, where the Southwest Chief stops daily.

Amtrak service ended in Wichita in 1979, when the Lone Star (formerly the Texas Chief) was discontinued. Passenger rail service is planned to return, with an extension of Amtrak's Heartland Flyer route via Newton expected to include Wichita as a major stop. The project is targeted to begin service by 2029.

Airports

- Wichita National Airport
- Jabara Airport

== See also ==
- Kansas census statistical areas
