= KGSO =

Sports radio station in Wichita, Kansas

- Wichita, Kansas; United States
- Broadcast area: Hutchinson, Kansas; Wichita, Kansas
- Frequency: 1410 kHz
- Branding: Wichita Sports Station 93.9 FM & 1410 AM KGSO

Programming
- Format: Sports
- Affiliations: Fox Sports Radio; Touchdown Radio Network; Gridiron Radio Network; Oklahoma Sooners

Ownership
- Owner: Steckline Communications Inc.
- Sister stations: KGHF, KQAM

History
- First air date: April 1, 1951 (as KWBB)
- Former call signs: KWBB (1951–1977); KBUL (1977–1978); KEYN (1978–1980); KQAM (1980–1997); KMYR (1997–2005)
- Call sign meaning: Go Sooners

Technical information
- Licensing authority: FCC
- Facility ID: 53150
- Class: B
- Power: 5,000 watts (day); 1,000 watts (night)
- Transmitter coordinates: 37°44′05″N 97°21′7.2″W
- Translator: 93.9 K230BY (Wichita)
- Repeater: 99.7 KGHF-HD3 (Belle Plaine)

Links
- Public license information: Public file; LMS
- Website: KGSO Online

KGSO (1410 AM, "Sports Radio 93.9 FM & 1410 AM KGSO") is an American broadcast radio station licensed to serve the community of Wichita, Kansas. The station is owned and operated by Steckline Communications Inc. The station was assigned current call sign "KGSO" by the Federal Communications Commission (FCC) on May 1, 2005.

== Programming ==
KGSO broadcasts a sports format. In addition to its usual mix of local and syndicated programming, KGSO airs local high school sports, Oklahoma Sooners football and men's basketball, and the NBC World Series.

Daily programming includes "The Game Plan" from 6-9 a.m. Monday through Friday and is hosted by Doug Downs. From 9-11 a.m., former Wichita State & Major League Baseball player Phil Stephenson and Leon Liebl host "In the Zone." Formerly, Felix Johnson and Sasha Bouska hosted "The Press Box," from 4-6 p.m., the afternoon drive time slot, topping other shows in the area in the same time. The "Saturday Morning Sports Page," which airs Saturday mornings at 7:00 in the fall, usually has a rotating host between the personalities, recaps high school football scores, and previews college and professional football that weekend.
