= 2019 in radio =

The following is a list of events affecting radio broadcasting in 2019. Events listed include radio program debuts, finales, cancellations, and station launches, closures and format changes, as well as information about controversies.

== Notable events ==
=== January ===
Date	Event	Source
1	Two months after going silent due to damage from Hurricane Michael, former Southern rock/blues hybrid WARB—Dothan, Alabama returns to the air with urban contemporary as "Vibe 105.9."	
1	Classic country format WRKA—Louisville began stunting with party songs based around a New Year's Day theme, leading up to a flip to Soft-based rhythmic AC as "103.9 The Groove" on January 14.	
1	The Air1 radio network drops Christian CHR in favor of contemporary-based Worship music.	
1	Adult album alternative simulcast WXTG/WXTG-FM—Norfolk/Hampton/Virginia Beach flips to all-news while the format continues on WTYD—Williamsburg.	
2	The United States Department of Justice (DOJ) orders Way Broadcasting (DBA RM Broadcasting), owner of WZHF—Capitol Heights, Maryland/Washington, D.C., to register the station as a foreign agent due to its carriage of Radio Sputnik via a local marketing agreement with Rossiya Segodnya, the Russian Federation government-owned news agency. The DOJ alleges Rossiya Segodnya "has complete control" of WZHF through the lease agreement and is operating the station "to advance Russian interests", with Way Broadcasting obligated to perform maintenance on WZHF's equipment to maximize the exposure of Radio Sputnik to as broad an American audience as possible. Way denies the existence of a joint venture with Russian interests and claims the lease did not create "an agency relationship".	
2	CKOO-FM—Kelowna, British Columbia abandons its oldies format for an AC format as Soft 103.9.	
3	Upon the completion of the simulcast between urban AC KMEZ—Port Sulphur/New Orleans and sister KKND as KMEZ replaces the latter at 102.9, KKND is relaunched with classic hits, branded as "106.7 The Krewe."	
4	Most of the air staff of country KKGQ—Newton/Wichita are released, leaving only mid–day DJ Brian Michaels. A new lineup is expected to be announced soon.	
4	Cumulus Media makes major changes in Western Michigan. WBBL—Grand Rapids drops sports and becomes a simulcast of country WTNR—Holland, utilizing the "Thunder" branding; the simulcast ended on January 19 with WTNR flipping to adult album alternative as "94.5 The Q." The sports format moves over to WJRW Grand Rapids and WKLQ—Whitehall. The move is part of a shuffle that will see Michigan Media Network acquire WBBL's Huge Show hosted by Bill Simonson, which will continue to be syndicated to its affiliates in Michigan.	
4	WSOL-FM—Brunswick, Georgia/Jacksonville returns to urban AC after nearly five years with classic hip hop.	
7	The Los Angeles/Southern California trimulcast of KSSE/KSSC/KSSD drops Spanish AC "La Suavecita" after one year and starts simulcasting Spanish adult hits sister KLYY—Riverside, thus bringing the "Jose" branding back to the area, when it was last used at KDLD/KDLE, who had dropped it around the same time for Regional Mexican "La Tricolor" until May 2018 when it flipped back to the "Super Estrella" brand, this time as Spanish classic rock.	
7	The former America's Morning Show associated mainly with the Cumulus Media Nash FM network of country stations rebrands for the third time in three years as solely The Ty Bentli Show, reduced from the Ty, Kelly and Chuck Show several months after Kelly Ford's departure; Chuck Wicks continues to serve as Bentli's sidekick on the program. Unfortunately on the same day, flagship station WNSH—Newark/New York City drops the program in favor of a music-intensive morning block.	
7	KNOC—Natchitoches, Louisiana, drops urban AC for classic country as "95.9 Kix Country".	
9	After two years with rhythmic Top 40, WXZO—Willsboro, New York/Burlington flipped to a satellite feed of MeTV-FM. The move comes in the wake of parent owner Vox AM/FM's acquisition of CHR WXXX in December 2018.	
9	In Albuquerque, Spanish AC "La Suavecita" replaces Regional Mexican "La Tricolor" at KRZY-FM	
10	Following the airing of Lifetime's docu-series Surviving R. Kelly, which resulted in authorities launching investigations into allegations of sexual abuse, a handful of key urban contemporary and urban AC outlets led by KKDA-FM and KRNB—Dallas, KJLH—Los Angeles, WBLS—New York City, and WAMJ—Atlanta announce they will no longer play music by R. Kelly; SiriusXM also bans his music, only announcing mentions of his songs on their weekend countdown shows focused on the 1990s and 2000s. Several artists who had previously collaborated with him pulled his music from their social media accounts, while eight days later, RCA Records officially dropped him from their roster.	
11	The classic hip hop quadcast of WMTX-HD2/W233AV/W256CT/W290BJ—Tampa/St. Petersburg abruptly ends, and starts redirecting listeners to urban contemporary sister WBTP, who adjusts their direction to a more mainstream urban presentation in part due to a drop in the Nielsen Audio ratings. WMTX-HD2 and its translators' flipped to a simulcast of talk WFLA on January 14.	
14	Entercom expands the "Channel Q" branding to Seattle, as it flips KNDD-HD2 from all-Pacific Northwest bands and artists and K277AE from a feed of rhythmic Hot AC KHTP—Tacoma to the LGBTQ/Dance hybrid. The move gives Seattle two Dance/EDM outlets, joining the already established Seattle Public Schools' KNHC.	
14	Seven Mountains Media, a Pennsylvania-based broadcaster, purchases a package of stations in New York's Southern Tier from Community Broadcasters, LLC. The package had been in Community Broadcasters' hands since Backyard Broadcasting sold the stations in its exit of the radio business in 2013.	
15	Two Halifax radio stations make a switch to Soft AC. Evanov's CKHY-FM abruptly dumps their Mainstream rock format and its "Rock" moniker after nearly 6 months for "Jewel 105". This comes as a preemptive move for CKUL-FM which in turn, switched from adult top 40 "Mix 96.5" to that same format as "The Breeze" two days later becoming the third radio station owned by Stingray to adopt the "Breeze" format and branding.	
17	Fox Sports Radio affiliate KGA/K278CY—Spokane relaunches its format to a hybrid sports/hip-hop mix as "103.5 The Game." The station, whose presentation will mostly be music oriented and is expected to serve as a flanker for CHR sister KZBD and to counter rhythmic rival KEZE, continues to serve as the home for Gonzaga University basketball, Spokane Chiefs hockey, and Spokane Indians baseball.	
18	A Nielsen BDS Radio data research for 2018 confirms that rhythmic Top 40 returned to the new music lead, as reflected by the number of top 20 songs in the format with 106 titles, up from 103 from 2017. urban contemporary is second, having charted 104 top 20 songs last year. Meanwhile, the number of top 20 hits at Mainstream Top 40 continues to decline with 105 titles in 2013, followed by 96 in 2015, and 87 in 2018, placing it fifth behind active rock (fourth with 92 titles) and adult album alternative (third with 100 titles) respectively. Rounding out the remaining five were country (6th with 85 titles), alternative rock (7th with 84), Adult Top 40 (8th with 82), Urban Adult Contemporary (9th with 75) and Adult Contemporary (10th with 69).	
21	KMXA—Denver split from its simulcast with Spanish AC KJMN and switched to ESPN Deportes Radio, marking a return to the format after seven years.	
23	After a 20-year run as Vice President of Programming and National Digital Program Director for Emmis Communications, including overseeing rhythmic Top 40 KPWR and since 2017 classic hip hop KDAY for Emmis and (current owner) Meruelo Media, Jimmy Steal exits the Los Angeles outlets to take a new role as Vice President of Branding and Content for Hubbard Broadcasting's Hot AC WTMX—Chicago.	
31	NHL's St. Louis Blues switches flagship stations, moving from KMOX to WXOS in a four-year deal that includes a cross-promotion with Hubbard Broadcasting's St. Louis cluster and expanded content, starting with the 2019–2020 season. Chris Kerber and Joey Vitale will remain with the team's broadcasts with the move from KMOX to WXOS.	

=== February ===
Date	Event	Source
1	KMGW—Yakima drops rhythmic oldies for classic hits, putting it in competition with KARY-FM.	
1	KTTU-HD2/K245BG—Lubbock drops active rock for 1990s-based classic country, a move that gives the Ramar Communications outlet a companion for Red Dirt-focused K226CH/KTTU-HD4 and increased competition for country listeners in the central west Texas market, joining current-focused rivals KLLL-FM and KQBR, and Classic-based KSSL/K231BE.	
5	Alpha Media sells off its Peoria cluster (classic hits and sports translator WPBG/W240DM/WPBG-HD3, classic hip hop WNGY, country WXCL, AC WSWT, oldies WIRL/W274BM, and talk WMBD/W262BY) to Midwest Communications, giving the Wisconsin-based broadcaster its maiden entry into Illinois.	
7	Emmis Communications and Educational Media Foundation files a series of contingent applications that will see several stations in South Texas adjust their coverage in the San Antonio, Corpus Christi, and Austin markets. Emmis will downgrade adult hits KBPA—San Marcos from a Class C0 to a C1 with 48 kW/326.2m from a tower just east of downtown Austin giving the station a better signal in the northern suburbs, along with a new city of license. KMJR—Odem/Corpus Christi will move from 98.3 to 103.7, and KXAI—Refugio, Texas, also at 103.7, will relocate from to new city-of-license Balcones Heights, Texas, and downgrade from class C1 to Class A with 4.3 kW/98m, where it will cover San Antonio and its adjacent suburbs.	
8	WXZX—Hilliard/Columbus, Ohio revives its "105.7 The Brew" moniker and its classic rock format (this time with an emphasis on 1980s, 1990s, and 2000s) after a lackluster three-year run with sports and prior to that a two-year stint with alternative.	
8	The Virgin Radio branding expands into Victoria, British Columbia as Hot AC 107.3 Kool FM CHBE-FM switches to that branding with a CHR/Top 40 format becoming the latest radio station owned by Bell Media to adopt the "Virgin Radio" branding as it takes on rival station CHTT-FM.	
11	After three years as "The Move," rhythmic Top 40 CFXJ-FM—Toronto rebrands itself as "Flow 93.5" again, this time with an emphasis on current hip-hop hits.	
13	Cumulus Media announces two deals with Entercom and Educational Media Foundation, all involving some of Cumulus's highest-profile FM stations. Two of Cumulus's three New York City FMs are sold (WNSH to Entercom and WPLJ to EMF), along with stations in Syracuse (WXTL), Washington, DC (WRQX), Savannah (WZAT), Atlanta (WYAY), San Jose (KFFG) (the aforementioned stations to EMF) and Springfield, Massachusetts (WMAS/WHLL, both to Entercom); Cumulus, in turn, receives Entercom's Indianapolis stations (WXNT, WZPL and WNTR). The combined deals are noted for having been successfully embargoed from trade publications and websites despite EMF making an escrow payment for their part of the deal on December 31, 2018.	
15	Apollo Global Management officially acquires Cox Media Group's 14 television stations, along with its entire Dayton cluster that consists of CBS affiliate WHIO-TV, radio sisters WHIO and WHIO-FM, WHKO, and WZLR/W266BG, and newspapers Springfield News-Sun and Dayton Daily News, the latter cluster retaining its legacy in the market due to Cox's origins that began in 1889 with the purchase of the Daily News by founder James M. Cox. The deal, estimated to be around $3 billion, will also include some joint venture agreements with Cox's radio, newspaper, and other media properties owned by the Atlanta-based company. This will be Apollo's second television group acquisition, as it has purchased Okemos, Michigan-based Northwest Broadcasting, which owns 21 stations in ten markets and plans to combine them with the Cox assets once the deal is approved by the FCC. The Cox family will continue to have a minority stake in the television properties.	
20	In the wake of a fallout from a lack of payment from the proceeds of a state lawsuit, Chuck Brennan's Badlands Airtime is being sued by John and Heidi Small's Cup O' Dirt LLC in Federal Court for $450,000 in attorney fees and expenses Brennan was ordered to pay. The dispute stemmed from a March 2015 failed sale of KZOY/K221FO—Sioux Falls, South Dakota that Brennan was about to purchase from the Smalls for $1.5 million, only to default after agreeing to instead acquire then-KCFS (later KBAD-FM, now KGWD) from the University of Sioux Falls for the same amount, which resulted in the Smalls being awarded $750,000 in damages from Brennan in 2018, and cites the sale of KBAD-FM to Real Presence Radio for $945,000 in April 2018 to "hinder, delay, impede and impair the ability of Cup O' Dirt to recover on the money judgement and to vindicate the verdict of the jury." Brennan sold KBAD-FM to Real Presence Radio after his tourist attraction Badlands Pawn which the station was part of shut down in September 2017 after the South Dakota Division of Banking revoked all the business licenses of his Dollar Loan Center locations in the state.	
21	SiriusXM adds 100+ new "Xtra Channels" to its platforms and devices, utilizing the same setup as its recently acquired Pandora model.	
22	Entercom's Radio.com streaming platform adds stations owned by Bonneville International (22 stations in six markets) and Cox Media Group (55 stations in 11 markets) to its list, including their in-house podcasts produced by the companies. The expansion comes on the heels of adding CNN and Bloomberg News to the lineup on February 19.	
25	Tribune Media's CW affiliate KDAF-TV—Dallas/Fort Worth forms a partnership with Urban One's rhythmic Top 40 KBFB—Dallas to launch a pop/lifestyle culture-centric morning show simulcast called The Beat on 33, hosted by the DJs from KBFB's Veda Loca in The Morning program (Veda Loca and co-hosts J-Cruz, Jazzi Black and DJ Kayotik).	
26	CKCE-FM—Calgary, Alberta rebrands from "101.5 Kool FM" to "101.5 Today Radio". The station's format still remains Hot AC but with an emphasis on 80s/90s hits.	
28	A pair of frequency changes takes place in Biloxi/Gulfport/Pascagoula. Telesouth Communications' recently acquired Alpha Media property WXYK and its formerly owned WQBB trades places, with WXYK and its CHR format moving from 107.1 to 105.9 (giving "The Monkey" expanded coverage), while WQBB drops Bob FM and goes the other way to 107.1 with new calls WLGF under new owner Port Broadcasting, who later flipped the station to an affiliate of K-Love March 11.	

=== March ===
Date	Event	Source
1	At 4 p.m. (ET), after playing "Broken" by Lovelytheband and "In Bloom" by Nirvana, alternative WDTW-FM Detroit began stunting with a loop of AC/DC's "It's a Long Way to the Top (If You Wanna Rock 'n' Roll)", leading up to a 5 p.m. flip back to classic rock after three years, reviving the locally famous brand of WLLZ, as "106.7 Detroit's Wheels." The brand (and callsign) were previously used on WDZH from 1980 to 1995. The first song to spin on "Detroit's Wheels" was "Back in Black" by AC/DC. The call sign was officially changed to WLLZ one week later.	
2	WGGO—Salamanca, New York returns to regular programming after nearly two years of intermittent silence and temporary formats, this time carrying Premiere Networks conservative talk radio, returning The Rush Limbaugh Show to the market after several years of absence.	
4	iHeartMedia's Aloha Stations Trust swaps classic rock WEKL—Augusta, adult hits WSFF—Vinton/Roanoke and simulcast WSNZ—Lynchburg, and classic country WLRX—Ironton, Ohio/Huntington, West Virginia, to Educational Media Foundation for six translators: K266BD—Carmel Valley, California (KION—Salinas/KOCN-HD2—Pacific Grove), K253BV—Oklahoma City (KBRU-HD2), W227BF—Shoreview/Minneapolis (KQQL-HD2—Anoka), W292DH—Pittsburgh (WBGG), W221CR—Memphis (WREC), and W248BQ—Nashville (WNRQ-HD2).	
5	In the wake of HBO's airing of the controversial documentary Leaving Neverland, Cogeco pulls Michael Jackson's music library from its Montreal outlets (Anglophone rhythmic Top 40 CKBE-FM, Francophone CHR CKOI-FM and Francophone rhythmic AC CFGL-FM), and does the same at the company's 20 outlets across Quebec days later. A spokeswoman for Cogeco cited complaints from listeners as the reason behind the decision.	
6	Univision Communications rebrands Univision Radio as "Uforia Audio Network".	
7	Just 6 months after launching, Emmis moves KGSR's "Austin City Limits Radio" to their Austin translator K246BD/KGSR-HD2. The primary 93.3 signal flipped to Soft AC as "Star 93.3" on March 8.	
8	WWJK—Green Cove Springs, Florida/Jacksonville changed formats from adult hits to active rock, branded as "107.3 Planet Radio".	
13	For the first time since it was attempted by KYCY—San Francisco from 2005 to 2008, WSAN—Allentown, Pennsylvania drops ESPN Deportes Radio to broadcast an all-podcast format, utilizing content from parent owner iHeartMedia's library of podcast programs. The station will continue to serve as the home of Lehigh Valley Phantoms minor league hockey broadcasts.	
14	WBGA/W242CJ—Brunswick, Georgia drops urban AC for Gospel, avoiding an overlap with sister station WSOL-FM, who returned to urban AC from classic hip hop in January.	
15	The Federal Communications Commission adopted new rules that was approved by the United States Congress in 2018, called The 2018 Reimbursement Expansion Act, which will go towards reimbursing FM stations as well as Low Power TV and TV translators that were "forced to incur costs to permanently relocate, temporarily or permanently modify their facilities, or purchase or modify auxiliary facilities" due to the ongoing television repack. The rules apply to all FM signals that were licensed and operating on April 13, 2017, that shared a tower with a repacked television station will be eligible for reimbursement, estimated at $150 million, including costs for relocating, modifications of facilities or to build auxiliary facilities while a television station was rebuilding their facilities. A statutory deadline have been to implement the rules, ending March 23.	
19	Adult hits WVLZ/W268BP—Maryville/Rockford/Knoxville, Tennessee switches to active rock. Two days later, alternative WNFZ—Powell switches to Jack FM following an ownership change from Oak Ridge FM to Midwest Communications.	
25	The FCC has opened an investigation into a complaint made against Entercom's Buffalo stations regarding a series of overcharges that were made by an alleged congressional candidate for ads she purchased in 2018, and whether it charged the candidate a higher rate than that paid by commercial advertisers such as law firms and auto dealerships, in violation of federal law. At issue involved the congressional race between Nathan McMurray and incumbent Chris Collins, in which McMurray believed he was charged a lot more to place ads on the stations than Collins; evidence obtained by The Buffalo News indicated that both McMurray and Collins were charged the same rate for airtime. The alleged candidate, Jackie Drost, was not on any Congressional ballot, nor did Entercom have any record of her trying to buy airtime on its stations. Entercom acknowledged that it had not posted required information about the 2018 ad campaigns on its website until January but said this was an inadvertent error and denied any violation of federal law, but agreed to cooperate with the investigation.	
26	After 17 years, CING-FM—Hamilton/Toronto revives the "Energy" branding but retains its Adult Top 40 direction. The relaunch coincided with the return of former CHR CKFM-FM morning hosts Scott Tucker and Maura Greirson to the same timeslot at CING.	
27	iHeartMedia trades its Frederick, Maryland combo of talk WFMD and country WFRE (operating under the Aloha Trust Group) to Connoisseur Media in exchange for their Erie cluster (country WTWF, "Bob FM" WXBB, AC WLTM, CHR WRTS, classic rock WRKT, sports WFNN and talk WJET).	
29	Newly formed Wichita-based company Allied Media Partners acquires six properties in this Kansas market from Rocking M Media (country KKGQ—Newton, rhythmic Hot AC KWME and AC KLEY/K262CQ—Wellington, "Bob FM" KIBB—Haven, AAA KVWF—Augusta, and talk KKLE—Winfield).	

=== April ===
Date	Event	Source
1	Binnie Media's oldies WNNH—Henniker, New Hampshire flips to a simulcast of classic hits WFNQ—Nashua.	
8	Rhythmic Top 40 KOPW—Plattsmouth/Omaha/Council Bluffs drops Big Boy's Neighborhood for Chef West and The Morning Scramble with Tay 'Mr. West' Westberry and former American Idol season 13 contestant (and YouTube blogger) Alyssa Siebken.	
11	WBOS—Brookline/Boston drops alternative for 1980s-90s classic rock as "Rock 92.9".	
11	PBS member station WGBY-TV—Springfield/Holyoke, Massachusetts (a semi-satellite of Boston's WGBH-TV and licensed to parent owner WGBH Educational Foundation) and New England Public Radio announces a merger between the two public broadcasters, rebranding as New England Public Media. The newly formed organization will utilize the combination to increase the newsroom and coverage of its Western Massachusetts region, with the WGBH Educational Foundation, who'll continue to retain ownership of WGBY, investing $6 million over six years in the new venture.	
12	KXTN-FM—San Antonio drops Tejano for rhythmic AC, billing itself as "Vibe 107.5" and adopts the new calls KVBH. The move gives rhythmic Top 40 sister KBBT a flanker against the rival rhythmic and classic hip hop duo of KTFM and KTFM-HD2/K277CX. The flip also sees the Tejano genre, which in part have been skewing older and a factor in KXTN's declining ratings, disappearing from the FM airwaves as parent owner Univision relocated the format to its AM sister KXTN and KVBH-HD2.	
12	Lilly Broadcasting returns to radio with its purchase of most of the assets of Radio Partners, which consists of three stations in Warren, Pennsylvania: WKNB, WNAE and WRRN. The three stations will be merged with the "Erie News Now" television cluster of WICU-TV and WSEE-TV.	
15	Meruelo Media purchases classic rock KLOS—Los Angeles from Cumulus Media for $43 million, agreeing to take over operations of the station the next day via a local marketing agreement. Concurrently, Meruelo-owned rhythmic Top 40 KPWR—Los Angeles dismisses morning hosts J Cruz, DJ Lechero and Jeff 'The Sports Dude' Garcia with no explanation; J Cruz later joins KRRL as afternoon host.	
15	Cumulus trades talk WICC—Bridgeport, Connecticut and AC WEBE—Westport to Connoisseur Media in exchange for Connoisseur's Allentown, Pennsylvania roster of classic rock WODE-FM—Easton, sports WEEX—Easton, alternative WWYY—Belvidere, New Jersey (relayed over W234AX—Allentown) and WEEX simulcast WTKZ—Allentown.	
15	Youngstown picks up a rhythmic Top 40 for the first time in nearly 20 years, and since urban contemporary WRBP flipped to K-Love in 2013, as WLOA/W272EI (the former licensed to Farrell, Pennsylvania) makes its debut as "Loud 102.3."	
18	WKZG—Seymour/Green Bay shifts from classic hits to AC, filling a void that had been left open in the market for a decade.	
21	The Cincinnati area multicast of WMWX—Miamitown, WYNS—Waynesville, WKCX—Crittenden, Kentucky, and two LPFMs, drops the classic rock "ClassX" presentation for Christian classic hits, billed as "The Touch."	
28	Grand Junction, Colorado picks up a classic hip hop outlet, as former Adult Top 40 KGJX-HD3/K232FB relaunches as "94.3 The Beat."	
30	West Virginia Radio Corporation makes a series of major moves. In Martinsburg/Hagerstown, WKMZ-FM drops CHR after two years and begins stunting with Christmas music as it prepared to return to AC and its former WLTF calls, while in nearby Berkeley Springs, they acquire oldies simulcast WCST and WXDC from Metro Radio LLC. WCST will split from the simulcast of WXDC and become a simulcast of talk sister WEPM/W229CM, with WXDC shifting to classic hits.	

=== May ===
Date	Event	Source
1	Bill O'Reilly returns to radio, ten years after his retirement from The Radio Factor, with a 15-minute daily show, The O'Reilly Update.	
1	WHBU/W279CL—Anderson, Indiana drops talk for oldies. The station will continue to offer local high school, Purdue University football and basketball broadcasts, and auto racing broadcasts from IndyCar and NASCAR.	
6	WYEZ—Murrells Inlet/Myrtle Beach, South Carolina drops Adult Top 40 for conservative talk, billing itself as "Talk 94.5" with new calls WTKN. The upstart will take on rival talker WRNN-FM, whose former morning co-host Liz Callaway joined WYEZ after leaving WRNN in February.	
6	El Dorado Broadcasting acquires Entercom's outlets in California's Victor Valley region, CBS Sports Radio affiliate KMPS—Hesperia and classic hits KVFG—Victorville. The two stations joins El Dorado's four other properties in the market. On August 26, KVFG flipped to Regional Mexican as "La X 103.1" with new calls KXVV, while KMPS is taken silent for "financial reasons".	
6	Bustos Media expands its presence in the Puget Sound area with the purchase of KFNY—Centralia, Washington from iHeartMedia's Ocean States Divestment Trust for $3 million. The station will drop its Smooth Jazz format to simulcast Regional Mexican duo KMIA—Auburn and KZNW—Oak Harbor.	
6	American station group iHeartMedia emerges from Chapter 11 bankruptcy, which it filed for last year after accumulating $20.3 billion in debt.	
6	ESPN Deportes Radio affiliate KHHL—Karnes City/San Antonio switch to a simulcast of regional Mexican KLEY-FM—Jourdanton.	
7	Connoisseur Media exits the Billings market with sale of its six properties (talk KYYA, ESPN Radio affiliate KBLG, country KRKX, active rock KRZN, classic hits KWMY, and CHR KPLN) to Desert Mountain Broadcasting.	
12	Alpha Media CHR KFRX—Lincoln, Nebraska fires morning host and program director Matt McKay (real name Matthew Rydberg) after an April 21 arrest for domestic violence against his wife, in which he also tried to strangle her during an argument, an assault for which he faces carries a three-year prison term in Nebraska. McKay was placed on leave during the time of his arrest until management dismissed him.	
17	CISO-FM—Orillia, Ontario, dumps its classic hits format after nearly seven months as it switches to an alternative rock format while retaining the "Max FM" branding. The station's unsuccessful classic hits format debuted last November replacing AC 89.1 Sunshine FM.	
21	Cumulus Media has filed papers with the FCC to allow up to 100 percent foreign investment in the company. If the petition is granted (as the FCC will allow comments and opinions to be filed by June 20 and replies by July 8), special warrants agreed to as part of Cumulus' bankruptcy restructuring last year would be triggered increasing foreign ownership of Cumulus to 31 percent equity and 34 percent on a voting basis. Currently, Cumulus' voting and equity stakes were 22.5% held by foreign interests with no single entity holding more than five percent.	
22	Meruelo Media expands its Los Angeles portfolio with the purchase of Grupo Radio Centro's Regional Mexican KXOS for an undisclosed amount. Meruelo will also help launch a Spanish All-News format in tandem with Grupo Radio Centro on an HD subchannel of KXOS and develop content for Mereulo's KWHY-TV.	
23	CKJH—Melfort, Saskatchewan rebrands from CK750 to Beach Radio with 80s/90s classic hits.	
24	Cumulus Media flips CHR WYRG Indianapolis to active rock as "93.9X Rocks" with new calls WNDX. The flip comes as Cumulus took over ownership of Entercom's WZPL to avoid overlap while filling a space in-between iHeartMedia's classic rock WFBQ and alternative WOLT. The Bert Show, which aired on WYRG, moves to WNTR.	
24	Binnie Media expands the "Frank FM" brand in New Hampshire, as AC sisters WLNH-FM—Laconia and WBYY—Somersworth/Portsmouth join WFNQ—Nashua and WNNH—Henniker in forming a simulcast of the adult hits format. Binnie also flips talk WEMJ/W297BS Laconia to a simulcast of CHR sister WJYY—Concord/Manchester, thus expanding its reach to the Lakes Region around Laconia.	
24	WVZA—Herrin/Marion/Carbondale drops AC for alternative as "Alt 2K," emphasizing a current-based direction with recurrents from the 2000s. The flip will serve as a flanker for active rock sister WTAO-FM in the Southern Illinois area.	
28	Bell Media rebrands its 13 country stations across Canada, including former alternative rocker CKLC-FM—Kingston, Ontario, to the Pure Country moniker.	
30	With Educational Media Foundation taking ownership of WSFF (to become WLRX) and WSNZ (to become WAWX), rhythmic Top 40 WJJS—Roanoke moved to 93.5, replacing Hot AC WSNV, while retaining its simulcast on WJJX—Appomattox/Lynchburg. In turn WSFF and WSNZ's adult hits "Steve-FM" format (at 101.7 and 106.1 respectively) moved to 104.9 in Roanoke under new WSTV call letters.	
30	Call Communications, the parent owner of the Christian CHR "Call Radio" network that broadcasts from flagship station WMKL—Hammocks/Miami, along with three co-owned full-powered and four translators that make up the network, announced plans to phase out terrestrial broadcasting altogether in favor of a digital platform that comprises streaming and on-demand music, podcasts, high school sports, and live concerts and events while building a digital production studio and hire additional programming staff. No decision has been made on whether Call will continue owning, selling, or cease operations on the stations.	
30	Liberal talk KABQ—Albuquerque switched to an all-podcast format, utilizing iHeartMedia's podcast library; this occurs with little advance notice (trade website RadioInsight didn't report the change until July 9). KABQ up to that point was the longest-running liberal talk station in the country.	
31	The sales of WPLJ—New York City, WRQX—Washington, DC, WYAY—Gainesville/Atlanta, KFFG—San Jose, California, WZAT—Tybee Island/Savannah, Georgia, and WXTL—Syracuse, New York from Cumulus Media to Educational Media Foundation closes; all simultaneously flip to K-Love.	

=== June ===
Date	Event	Source
1	Illinois State University, the owners of WGLT—Normal/Bloomington, takes over the operations of WCBU—Peoria from Bradley University. As part of the deal, Bradley retained ownership of WCBU's license with ISU handling all facets of the station's operations, as well as its talk format, while WGLT's Peoria translator W278AE switched to a simulcast of WCBU's HD2 Classical service to avoid any duplication of NPR programs or similar shows.	
3	The LGBTQ/dance hybrid Channel Q platform expands to five more markets, and adds another OTA signal as KGMZ—San Francisco drops its simulcast of sports sister KGMZ-FM to pick up the brand.	
3	Apple announced the launching of its new iOS 13 device, which will allow users to call up audio streams from over 100,000 radio stations globally via SIRI voice command. The iPhone voice command platform will access streams from iHeartRadio, Radio.com, and TuneIn.	
3	Singapore radio station 938Now officially rebrands as CNA938, coinciding with the 20th anniversary of the newly rebranded CNA television channel.	
4	3 Horizons LLC announced that it has sold rhythmic Top 40 KWEE—West Linn/Portland to WAY-FM Network, whose Christian AC programming is also heard on K283BL via iHeartMedia's KFBW-HD2. The sale also ends its three-year LMA with Alpha Media, who is expected to announce plans to continue the format in another capacity as WAY-FM is expected to move the Christian AC format to KWEE upon the closing of the sale.	
5	Townsquare Media acquires and divests a pair of stations in Tuscaloosa. The company will buy urban contemporary WALJ—Northpoint from Apex Media and plans to rebrand the station from "105.1 Jamz" (mirroring former LMA partner WBHJ—Birmingham's "95.7 Jamz" moniker) to "105.1 The Block" while at the same time spins off sports WTID—Marion to Educational Media Foundation for $110,000. The latter's format will move to W256CG/WTUG-HD2.	
6	Nashville will serve as a launching pad for what is billed as the first country/hip-hop hybrid rhythmic Top 40 in the United States with the debut of WQSE/W244EK—White Bluff. The station, acquired by and owned by Jamal 'Polow Da Don' Jones's Young Country Holdings, will feature a mix of country artists such as Kane Brown and Chris Young along with crossover stars such as Taylor Swift and Fifth Harmony and rappers like Ryan Upchurch, Migos, Yelawolf, Blanco Brown and Bubba Sparxxx.	
6	Vista Radio rebrands two of its stations in Lethbridge, Alberta: CJOC-FM rebrands to 94.1 Juice FM becoming the latest radio station to adopt the Juice FM branding while CKBD-FM drops its "Bridge" moniker and becomes 98.1 2Day FM while maintaining the modern AC format.	
10	Urban One announces the sale of its Detroit urban AC WDMK and its Gospel translators W228CJ, W252BX, and W260CB, to Beasley Broadcasting, and will also end its LMA deal with International Free and Accepted Modern Masons to continue operating urban contemporary WGPR at the end of the year.	
10	East Texas Results Media sells its Tyler/Longview roster of classic country KZXM—Bullard, CHR simulcast KFRO-FM—Gilmer/KLJT—Jacksonville, and Regional Mexican KMPA—Pittsburg, to Educational Media Foundation for $800,000. The stations will join two EMF-owned outlets in East Texas, Tyler-licensed KVNE and KGLY.	
10	Emmis Communications sells their 50.1% stake in the Austin cluster that it acquired in 2003 from the family of former President Lyndon B. Johnson's LBJ Broadcasting Company for $105 million to Sinclair Communications, who will regain full control of the six stations and three translators for $39.3 million, which it will rebrand under the name Waterloo Media. The sale will leave Emmis with eight stations, four each in Indianapolis and New York City.	
11	Dispatch Broadcast Group sells its radio and television stations, including WBNS/WBNS-FM—Columbus and ONN Radio, to Tegna for $535 million.	
13	KCRW—Santa Monica/Los Angeles's Jason Bentley announced that he is relinquishing his duties as music director and host of Morning Becomes Eclectic after 10 years on August 30, but will continue hosting the station's mix show Metropolis on Saturday nights; Bentley has been with KCRW since volunteering in 1988 and became a paid air talent in 1992. The Santa Monica Community College-owned station will seek out two positions, one each for Morning Becomes Eclectic and MD duties respectively.	
17	Nick Cannon is named the new morning host at rhythmic Top 40 KPWR—Los Angeles, whose program debuts on this date. The news was spoiled several days earlier by urban contemporary rival KRRL, whose air talents Big Boy and J.Cruz were former morning hosts at KPWR. The move marks Cannon's return to morning radio after a seven-year hiatus. He also replaced temporary host Cece Valencia, who returned to classic hip hop sister KDAY as co-morning host with one-time partner Romeo.	
17	KOAS—Las Vegas shifts from rhythmic oldies to urban AC as it rebrands as "Jammin' 105.7." The station's musical emphasis features a balance of current-based uptempo R&B hits and recurrents from the 80s, 90s, and 2000s.	
17	WRXD—Fajardo/San Juan returns to Spanish AC after a year with Spanish CHR, but retains the "Play 96.5" moniker.	
17	Telesouth Communications shuffles a pair of formats in Tupelo. The statewide "Supertalk Mississippi" format moved from WCNA—Potts Camp to WFTA—Fulton replacing classic hits "Power 101" and expands the coverage area for the "Supertalk" network. WCNA flipped to Hot AC, billed as "Mix 95.9".	
21	W255BY/WAJI-HD2—Fort Wayne splits from a simulcast of alternative WGBJ—Auburn to launch CHR "99.5 The Twenty-FM." The station, which will offer a commercial-free presentation featuring the "Top 20 hottest songs," will take on CHR WJFX and Adult Top 40 WMEE for listeners.	
25	WAMO/W297BU—Pittsburgh changed formats from rhythmic contemporary to urban adult contemporary, branded as "107.3 The Beat". However, sister simulcast W261AX and Entercom-partnered WBZZ-HD3 continues to use the "WAMO 100" calls and rhythmic Top 40 format.	
25	WROX-FM—Norfolk shifts from alternative to adult album alternative, featuring a broader, gold based playlist with songs as old as the 1970s and positioning as "More Variety, Less Repetition".	
26	iHeartMedia expands its Pride Radio format targeting the LGBTQ community to 12 more markets. The expansion was in response to rival Entercom's launching of the similar-formatted Channel Q platform. The move replaces EDM/Dance Evolution in several markets but continues as an iHeartRadio online platform.	
26	Union Broadcasting suspends sports WHB—Kansas City afternoon host Kevin Kietzman "until further notice" in the wake of the controversy surrounding comments on he made on his June 25 show about Kansas City Chiefs coach Andy Reid and his family, in which Kietzman criticized the Chiefs' handling of the Tyreek Hill child abuse charges as a lack of discipline within the organization, and then comparing that to issues regarding Reid's son Garrett's death from a heroin overdose in 2012 and another son's prison term, later referring instead to Reid hiring his sons to work for the team after drug convictions. Kietzman would later apologize to the Chiefs, Reid, and listeners for his actions. On June 28, Kietzman was released from WHB, ending a 22-year relationship and Kietzman's 6% stake in Union Broadcasting altogether.	
26	Apollo Global Management announces that it will acquire Cox Media Group's 55 radio properties after announcing in March that it was exploring a sale. The move will keep all of Cox's radio and television properties under one roof as Apollo has already announced in February that it will acquire the 14 television stations and its Dayton radio and newspaper operations, of which will retain the Cox Media Group name (it had originally chosen Terrier Media as a new name before the radio purchase). However, Cox will spin off CHR WPYO—Maitland/Orlando and alternative WSUN—Holiday/Tampa, Florida to a divestment trust due to having lost its grandfathered ownership status with the announced sale.	
27	Cumulus Media sells conservative talk WABC—New York City to Red Apple Media, a new company founded by conservative billionaire and syndicated talk host John Catsimatidis through his Red Apple Holdings, for $12.5 Million. Catsimatidis, who hosts a weekly program at Salem Media rival WNYM—Hackensack, New Jersey, plans to retain the current format and staff. The sale will leave Cumulus with only one station in New York City, urban AC WNBM—Bronxville.	
28	Urban AC WKAF—Brockton/Boston flipped to rhythmic oldies as "97.7 The Beat," with an emphasis on rhythmic Hits from the 1980s, 1990s, and 2000s. This type of direction is targeted towards listeners who grew up listening to WXKS-FM during its early years with a mass appeal rhythmic/Dance direction during the 1980s and those who listened to WJMN when its rhythmic Top 40 direction also had a broad variety during the 1990s and 2000s. The first song played on The Beat was Michael Jackson's "Beat It."	
28	Pacific Media Group acquires Ohana Broadcast Group's Honolulu cluster of Hawaiian contemporary KQMQ-FM, rhythmic AC KUMU-FM, rhythmic Top 40 KDDB (licensed to Waipahu) and alternative KPOI-FM for $5.5 million. All four stations will retain their current formats.	
28	KSBJ Educational Foundation expands its presence in the eastern part of the Houston and Golden Triangle area with purchase of Full Service AC KSHN—Liberty from Trinity River Valley Broadcasting, which plans to move the station's format online July 2.	
30	In a surprise move and without any notice or warning to its listeners, rhythmic Top 40 KVYB—Santa Barbara moved its call letters from 103.3 to 106.3, replacing the Classic hip hop format of KRUZ—Oak View (serving Ventura County), relaunching as CHR "106.3 The Vibe." The KRUZ call letters returned to the 103.3 frequency after 15 years with a classic hits format on July 1.	

=== July ===
Date	Event	Source
1	Standard General acquires a majority stake in rhythmic Top 40 WQHT and urban AC WBLS—New York City from Emmis Communications in a deal worth $91.5 million in cash and a $5 million note. Emmis CEO Jeff Smulyan will also serve as CEO of the new company, Mediaco Holding, which will enter into a shared services agreement with Emmis (whose shareholders will retain a 23.72% stake in Mediaco) while the employees remain on the Emmis payroll. Emmis will continue to own ESPN Radio flagship WEPN-FM (which is leased out to The Walt Disney Company under a LMA) and Gospel WLIB in New York City.	
1	WUBG/W287CW—Methuen, Massachusetts moves its classic hits format online as the stations targets the Boston area as an affiliate of Educational Media Foundation's K-Love format.	
1	The alternative war in Albany/Schenectady/Troy gets a shakeup after one year, as classic rock simulcasts WQBJ—Cobleskill and WQBK-FM—Rensselaer replaced "Alt 105.7" WQSH—Malta and rebrand itself as "Q105.7." On August 1, WQBJ would relaunch as the new "Alt 103.5" in its continuing battle with rival WINU—Altamont, while WQBK flipped to Soft AC as "103.9 The Breeze", putting it in a battle with the more established WYJB. The flips ends a simulcast for both WQBJ and WQBK than began in 1994.	
1	Stephens Media Group acquires Mapleton Communications' 37 stations across seven markets in four states with the exception of three stations in Chico, California that are being sold to Bustos Media and KSFN—San Francisco. The markets involved are Medford, Oregon (KCMX, KTMT, KAKT, KCMX-FM, KTMT-FM, and KBOY-FM), Merced, California (KYOS, KBRE, KABX-FM, KHTN, KLOQ-FM, and KUBB), Salinas/Monterey (KCDU-FM, KHIP, KKHK, KPIG-FM, and KWAV), Redding, California (KRNO, KQMS, KWLZ-FM, KRDG, KRRX, KSHA (FM), and KALF), Spokane (KGA, KJRB, KZBD, KEYF-FM, KDRK-FM, and KBBD), Alexandria, Louisiana (KBKK, KEZP, and KLAA-FM), and Monroe, Louisiana (KMYY, KNNW, KXRR, and KZRZ).	
1	KQEG—La Crosse, Wisconsin transitioned from oldies to Gold-based AC and takes the MeTV-FM brand.	
1	WMAL—Washington splits from its simulcast of conservative talk WMAL-FM—Woodbridge, Virginia, flipping to ESPN Radio as WSBN.	
1	KVXQ—Denver rebrands from "Open Air Radio" to "Indie 102.3." The adult album alternative station adjusted its focus towards a more music intensive direction featuring local and independent musicians at the Colorado Public Radio outlet.	
2	Staffers at Entravision's Sacramento outlets, rhythmic Top 40 KHHM and country KNTY (licensed to Shingle Springs), along with KNTY's Columbia/Modesto simulcast KCVR-FM, informed listeners that they have been let go as all three stations will flip to Spanish-language formats. KNTY flipped to Regional Mexican as a simulcast of sister KRCX and rebrands as "La Tricolor 99.9/101.9" on July 8. On July 29, KHHM and KCVR flipped to a Bilingual Top 40 simulcast as "Fuego 103.5", with an emphasis on Pop-intensive currents. The news ended a 22-year run for KHHM's Top 40 format in both Mainstream and rhythmic directions that date back to its start as KBMB, a 13-year run with country for "101.9 The Wolf," and a short 4-month run for "98.9 The Wolf."	
5	Univision Communications, owner of Uforia Audio Network, has contracted three investment banks, Morgan Stanley & Co. LLC, Moelis & Company LLC and LionTree LLC, to perform a strategic review of its assets and whether to sell the privately owned company. The news comes after Haim Saban, Madison Dearborn Partners and Providence Equity Partners were seeking at least a partial exit through a public stock offering or to sell the company completely. The three investors acquired the Hispanic-focused multimedia entity in 2006 and have explored offers to sell since 2014, although it did turn down a $15 billion bid by John Malone in 2017.	
8	KDSP—Denver drops sports in favor of conservative talk as "Freedom 93.7, Real News, Real Talk." The station, whose new calls will be KDFD, will also utilize its newly acquired FM translator K229BS Lakewood as its simulcast.	
11	Amarillo picked up a third Top 40, as Alpha Media flipped Regional Mexican KEYU-FM to new calls KVWE and moniker "We 102.9," with a hip-hop intensive rhythmic direction. The move puts the station up against rival rhythmic KQIZ-FM (the market's second most listened to station) and mainstream CHR KXSS-FM for listeners while serving as a flanker for market-leading classic rock sister KXGL. The Regional Mexican format and KEYU calls remained with former owner Gray Television due to its ownership of Telemundo affiliate KEYU as it goes to an online platform.	
11	After two days of stunting with a series of bird sounds, rhythmic Top 40 WMBX-HD2/W242CI—West Palm Beach launched with a CHR format, branded as "Party 96.3".	
12	Whitney Young resigned her position as morning co-host at Entercom CHR WPXY-FM—Rochester, New York over her inability to lessen the pay gender gap between herself and morning partner Corey James. Young began her career at WPXY-FM in 2014 before moving on to digital media work in 2016, only to return to the station as midday host in 2017 and later moving to mornings with James in 2018. Young posted her letter on Twitter that James was paid nearly double what she was and attempts to reduce the disparity after her promotion from middays to mornings failed; although she emphasized that James is a good friend, talented showman and fully deserving of his salary, Young felt that she was underpaid in comparison.	
17	JVC Media expands its Orlando roster with the acquisition of conservative talk WORL—Altamonte Springs & W288CJ Oviedo from Salem Media for $900,000, and will launch a new format on the two frequencies in August. Salem will hold on to the WORL calls, which will be exchanged with Spanish Christian WDYZ prior to the closing of the sale. JVC's other leased property, W231CT (which was programmed as active rock "Bud 94.1"), was recently sold by Circuitwerkes to iHeartMedia for $500,000.	
18	After a five-year run of Regional Mexican format as Radio Centro, at 9:39AM (PDT), KXOS—Los Angeles flipped from regional Mexican to Bilingual rhythmic Top 40 as "Cali 93.9" and changed calls to KLLI. The flip puts the station (whose direction will feature Latin pop and reggaeton) up against rival Spanish CHR KXOL-FM while serving as a flanker for rhythmic Top 40 sister KPWR, as it reunited the two stations after seven years.	
22	Bakersfield picked up a fifth Top 40, as Lotus Communications flipped Ranchera KCHJ-FM (part of a simulcast with AM sister KCHJ) to new calls KQKZ and moniker "Q92.1," mirroring its Visalia/Fresno sister KSEQ with a rhythmic direction. The move puts the station up against rival rhythmics KISV and KBDS, rhythmic-leaning CHR KLLY, and mainstream CHR KKXX-FM for listeners. The new format was planned to launch on July 15, but was pushed back a week in order to set up social media accounts.	
22	Hubbard Broadcasting rebrands country WIRK—Indiantown/West Palm Beach as "New Country 103.1".	
22	Indianapolis sees yet another radio shakeup, as iHeartMedia splits up the simulcast of Fox Sports Radio/talk hybrid WNDE and translator W248AW (97.5 FM), running a redirect loop pointing the WNDE audience to the 1260 frequency, whose programming also features Rush Limbaugh in its lineup. The translator is later sold to Educational Media Foundation on August 7 along with six other stations in a swap deal while continuing to operate the signal. On August 15 the translator flipped to CHR as "97.5 Kiss-FM", giving the market 3 Top 40s again.	
24	Cumulus Media makes a change in its Dallas/Fort Worth market, as it rebrands country outlet KSCS to "New Country 96.3". The station's format did not change.	
30	KRTO—Guadalupe/Santa Maria/Lompoc changed their format from rhythmic oldies to rhythmic contemporary, branded as "Mega Hits 97.1". The flip will put the station up against rhythmic rival KPAT while serving as a flanker for the market's top rated Regional Mexican sister KIDI-FM.	
31	CFSM-FM—Cranbrook, British Columbia rebrands from Summit 107 to 107.5 2Day FM becoming the latest radio station owned by Vista Radio to take on the "2Day FM" branding. The station's format was changed to modern AC.	
31	iHeartRadio quietly drops the branding of its children's CHR channel Nick Radio without any advanced notice and rebrands it as Hit Nation Jr., a children's version of the Hit Nation CHR-formatted channel, ending a six-year run for the Nickelodeon-branded channel.	

=== August ===
Date	Event	Source
2	WQBU-FM—Garden City/New York City changed their format from Regional Mexican to Spanish AC.	
5	KJZY—Sebastopol/Santa Rosa, California drops AC for Top 40/Dance as "93.7 The Beat," featuring Jamtraxx Media's club mixed oriented SPiN-FM format that was previously tried at WOLT—Greenville, South Carolina in 2012.	
5	After a week of stunting with novelty songs, KDRI/K269FV—Tucson flipped from Religious programming to oldies as "The Drive." Bobby Rich, who was last heard on KMXZ-FM from 1993 to 2017 before being let go over a comment that he made on social media, is named the station's PD/morning host.	
5	Kemp Broadcasting's KVGQ—Overton/Las Vegas transitions from Adult Top 40 to CHR, giving the market five Top 40s, joining Mainstream Top 40s Entercom's KLUC-FM and Ed Stolz's KFRH, and rhythmic rivals KYMT-HD2/K280DD and KVGQ's sister KVEG.	
7	iHeartMedia and Educational Media Foundation makes another translator swap deal. EMF will acquire seven stations from iHeart in exchange for six stations, all of which program an urban contemporary format under iHeart, thus suggesting the management at EMF were feeling uncomfortable with that format being on their licensed properties.	
7	Capital Area Career Center's student-run Diversified WQNA—Springfield, Illinois announces that they will put the station up for sale, as the school can no longer afford to keep running as it has zero students enrolled in the radio program for the 2019–2020 school year, and for the time being they're currently operating with a community volunteer air staff. Management at WQNA says the station will continue to operate until a new buyer is sought.	
12	Entercom flipped classic hip hop KRBQ—San Francisco to rhythmic oldies; retaining the previous name, the station is now positioning as "The Bay's Old School" with a focus on 1970s through 1990s R&B and disco/dance-pop classics.	
13	Nielsen Audio will release the first of its Continuous Diary Measurement ratings reports for the 46 markets converting to monthly releases, effective with the July 2019 survey, bringing the number of CDMs to 94 and will have monthly reporting (48 PPM markets and 46 CDM markets) representing 80% of radio's ad spend and population. The markets involved are Akron, Albany-Schenectady-Troy, Albuquerque, Allentown-Bethlehem, Bakersfield, Baton Rouge, Birmingham, Buffalo-Niagara Falls, Charleston (South Carolina), Chattanooga, Colorado Springs, Columbia (South Carolina), Dayton, Des Moines, El Paso, Fresno, Fort Myers-Naples, Grand Rapids, Greenville-New Bern-Jacksonville, Greenville-Spartanburg, Harrisburg-Lebanon-Carlisle, Honolulu, Huntsville, Jackson (Mississippi), Knoxville, Little Rock, Louisville, Madison, Mobile, Monterey-Salinas-Santa Cruz, New Orleans, Oklahoma City, Omaha-Council Bluffs, Puerto Rico, Richmond, Rochester (New York), Shreveport, Spokane, Springfield (Massachusetts), Syracuse, Toledo, Tucson, Tulsa, Wichita, Wilkes Barre-Scranton, and York.	
13	Urban One officially confirmed that 'Hurricane' Dave Smith was fired from his position as VP/Operations & Programming for Radio One Atlanta due to a lawsuit alleging multiple instances of sexual harassment. While Smith claimed that it was a "misunderstanding led to his dismissal", it was the filing of a lawsuit on August 5 by former urban contemporary WHTA evening host Feleg 'Shorty Mack' Abraham (who worked at the station from December 2016 until quitting in February 2018; she is currently a mid-day host at WFXE—Augusta, Georgia) that led to his firing, in which she claimed that in May 2017 Smith trapped her in his office, groped her, took his penis out and demanded she perform oral sex on him and suffered unspecified injuries escaping his grasp, as well as intentional infliction of emotional distress by Smith, negligent infliction of emotional distress by Urban One, negligent hiring, retention and supervision, assault and battery and false imprisonment. Smith has denied these charges and maintains his innocence.	
14	Radio Training Network ended its nearly 20-year LMA deal to operate "His Radio Talk" on iHeartMedia's WLFJ—Greenville, South Carolina. The station, who has programmed the format since March 2000, reverted the daytimer back to its previous WESC calls and started simulcasting country sister WESC-FM—Greenville. RTN will continue the Religious talk format on W225AZ, now being fed by WLFJ-HD4 and WHRT-FM—Cokesbury, South Carolina.	
15	The Channel Q platform added nine more markets, bringing the number of stations airing the LGBTQ/Dance format to 28.	
15	CJNW-FM—Edmonton, Alberta rebrands to Power 107 as it shifts towards a more rhythmic classic CHR sound with an emphasis on rhythmic pop-r&b hits from the 1990s and early 2000s. This marks the return of the "Power" branding to the Edmonton market for the first time since 2004 when CKNG-FM became Joe FM with variety hits.	
15	The "Jack FM" variety hits format makes its return to Victoria, British Columbia, after a four-year absence as Kiss 103.1 CHTT-FM dumps its Top 40 format and branding after dismissing all its on-air staff for the return of the "Jack" format and branding. The station's unsuccessful "Kiss" CHR format was launched back in February 2015 replacing Jack FM. The first song to be played on the newly relaunched Jack FM station was Bohemian Rhapsody by Queen.	
19	The FCC reached a settlement deal with Meruelo Media over misuse of the Emergency Alert System tones, collecting over $67,000 in civil penalties, and committing to a "strict" compliance regime as part of the consent decree, according to the FCC's Enforcement Bureau. The fine that were handed out resulted from a featured production piece that aired on classic hip hop KDAY—Los Angeles' morning show between September 8 and November 22, 2017, that aired a voiced promo of "Ninety-Three Five, K-DAY. Hip Hop, back in the day. It's time for (morning host) Romeo's romantic weather," featured multiple sound effects supposedly ripped from a video found online including EAS tones and the start of a "National Weather Service has issued..." warning. The production piece aired 106 times on KDAY and 33 times on KDEY-FM—Riverside/San Bernardino after it began simulcasting KDAY on October 30, 2017.	
19	CHNI-FM—Saint John, New Brunswick rebrands from Rock 88.9 to Q88.9 while maintaining the same mainstream rock format.	
21	After being held up for three years, the deal between the Cesar Chavez Foundation and Educational Media Foundation to swap KUFW—Woodlake/Visalia to EMF for KVPW—Kingsburg/Fresno has closed with the companies swapping programming on the two frequencies. KVPW flips from EMF's "Air 1" network to Regional Mexican "La Campesina" programming, while KUFW has picked up EMF's "K-Love" network and applies for new call letters KLXY.	
22	With rhythmic Top 40 KWEE—West Linn/Portland going to new owners WAY-FM Network, Alpha Media is expected to announce plans to continue the format on FM translator K275CH (broadcasting at 102.9 from Gresham), as it has dropped its simulcast of sports sister KXTG along with all references to the FM signal from the AM on this date. The transition becomes official September 16.	
25	Former Illinois congressman and conservative talk show host Joe Walsh announced his entry into the 2020 Presidential Election, where he'll run as a Republican and challenge incumbent Donald Trump (who Walsh had supported until recently) for the nomination. Due to the FCC's equal-time rule, it also de facto suspends his syndicated program that aired on Salem Media's WIND—Chicago and WNYM—New York City.	
26	WDAS/W273DO/WDAS-FMHD2 Philadelphia drops the adult hits/Health Information "Breakthrough Radio" format that they partnered with Children's Hospital of Philadelphia since September 2017 in favor of Fox Sports Radio, billed as "The Gambler." A third simulcast, W281BI Trenton, New Jersey, will carry a different format due to Fox Sports Radio already affiliated with Townsquare Media's WNJE in that market.	
26	Just three years after taking his morning show to syndication, and later becoming independently self produced, Tino Cochino is dropped by his flagship station, rhythmic Top 40 KKFR—Mayer/Phoenix. His program, which continues in syndication, is later picked up by another Phoenix station, CHR rival KZZP, for evenings starting September 8.	
26	IHeartMedia drops the Spanish CHR format of K276EL 103.1 FM (which is fed by KVET-FM-HD2) in Austin to simulcast sports KVET 1300 AM. The translator formerly simulcasted the AM signal from 2011 to 2012, before switching to rhythmic oldies that year.	
26	In St John's, Newfoundland, Longtime morning host Randy Snow makes his return to CHOZ-FM after a 16-year stint at rival station CKIX-FM. In addition, CHOZ-FM shifted to playing hits from the 90s, 2000s & today with its new slogan "Newfoundland's Music Mix, The New OZ FM".	
28	Good Karma Brands will take over operations of ESPN Radio's WMVP—Chicago from The Walt Disney Company as of September 28, under a long-term LMA deal. Disney will continue to own the station under the arrangement.	
28	CHOO-FM—Drumheller, Alberta dumps its "Drum FM" branding and its AC format to become Boom 99.5 with a classic hits format becoming the latest radio station owned by Stingray Radio to take on the "Boom" branding.	
30	Sports KJOC—Bettendorf/Davenport/Quad Cities flips to active rock as "I-Rock 93.5" while classic country KBOB—Davenport picks up KJOC's former sports format. The move restored the formats back to their original locations; KJOC-FM was previously active rock from 1995 to 2004, while KBOB carried a sports format from 1993 to 2003 and again from May to September 2014.	
30	Classic rock WNNX—Atlanta also makes a shift to active rock, but retained its current lineup, "Rock 100.5" branding, and "Atlanta's Best Rock" liner.	
30	Talk WGST—Atlanta rebrands as "Fox News Radio 640", while afternoon host Dana Barrett ends her show after 14 months to run in the 2020 election as a Democratic candidate in Georgia's 11th congressional district.	
30	The Spanish AC trimulcast of KJFA/K275AO—Belen/Albuquerque and KJFA-FM—Pecos/Santa Fe flipped to Bilingual rhythmic as "Fuego 102.9."	

=== September ===
Date	Event	Source
2	A report by FICCI-EY claims that the radio industry in India grew 7.5% in 2018, contributing 4.2% to the overall advertising revenues of the media and entertainment sector.	
2	US stations KVVF/KVVZ "Hot 105.7/100.7" in San Jose and San Francisco return to Spanish CHR and its "Latino Mix" branding after five years, after dropping their former format on August 30 to begin stunting with a loop of Vicente Fernandez's "Volver Volver" and J Balvin's "Reggaeton". The move leaves the Bay Area with three Top 40s, San Francisco's KYLD, KMVQ-FM, and KREV; the latter's signal doesn't reach the San Jose area. Both markets are left without a core rhythmic format for the first time.	
2	Entravision flips its six ESPN Deportes Radio affiliates, KBMB—Black Canyon City/Phoenix, KCVR—Lodi/Sacramento, KMXA—Aurora/Denver, KRZY—Albuquerque, KSVE—El Paso, and KBZO—Lubbock, to ranchera/norteño under the relaunched "Jose" branding, which was previously used for its now-defunct Spanish adult hits format. The move comes ahead of ESPN Radio's Spanish-language sister network's closure on September 8.	
2	After a weekend of going jockless, US alternative WZLB—Fort Walton Beach, Florida flips to classic rock and rebrands from "The Blaze" to "The Shark."	
2	CHXX-FM—Quebec City, Quebec, rebrands from "Pop 100.9" to "100.9 La Vibe" with more of a Modern AC/CHR-style format.	
3	iHeartMedia sports KGME—Phoenix revamps its daily lineup, moving afternoon drive host Jody Oehler to morning drive (forcing Dan Patrick's syndicated show off the schedule, which eventually moves to Hubbard's crosstown KDUS), while hiring Dan Sileo as the new afternoon drive host. Sileo's show lasts approximately four days after the Arizona Coyotes (of which KGME is their radio flagship) finds out about his checkered radio past.	
5	The Laramie, Cheyenne, Wyoming, and Fort Collins/Greeley, Colorado markets picked up its first rhythmic contemporary format in that region covering Northern Colorado and Southeastern Wyoming, as Laramie-licensed KARS-FM dropped classic rock to become "Power 102.9." While the flip marks the first time a rhythmic format has launched in Wyoming (as it takes on Laramie's CHR KIMX and by de facto fills a Top 40 void in Cheyenne), its expected to serve as a flanker for its Townsquare Media-owned Cheyenne-licensed Fort Collins sisters Adult Top 40 KKPL and country KUAD-FM against iHeartMedia's CHR KSME. KARS will also continue to serve as the flagship for Colorado State University football and basketball, thus sharing the green and gold in its logo with the school.	
6	After nearly 36 years as a rock station, most of its life as adult album alternative and its final year with alternative, Cumulus Media's KFOG—San Francisco drops the format to simulcast sports KNBR as KNBR-FM.	
6	Mainstream rock KLOS—Los Angeles completely shifts to classic rock, as it eliminates post–1990s modern rock tracks.	
7	Roger Dale Wahl, the owner of oldies WQZS—Meyersdale/Johnstown, Pennsylvania and Larimer Township Supervisor, is arrested on charges of creating a fake online dating profile of a woman in a scheme to lure people willing to rape her, including rape/threat of forcible compulsion, identity theft, criminal use of a communication facility and invasion of privacy, as well as tampering with physical evidence. Authorities say Wahl used equipment and devices that was connected from the station to a trail camera he secretly had hidden inside the woman's house over a six-year period – without her knowledge – and then used images from it to lure men to her home, and upon arrival Wahl encouraged men to rape her; Wahl would then destroy evidence linking himself to the crime. The arrest came after a person answering the ad alerted law enforcement about Wahl's activities after meeting him.	
20	The Walt Disney Company rebrands ABC Radio as ABC Audio to reflect its diversified platform of radio, online, and podcast programming.	
23	The United States Court of Appeals for the Third Circuit, in a 2-1 ruling, has vacated the Federal Communications Commission's 2017 broadcast ownership rule changes that loosened cross-ownership and duopoly prohibitions, and remanded them to the commission for further consideration of how the changes affect ownership diversity. The decision was deemed a victory for grassroots media groups and organizations who challenged the changes, while at the same time criticized by FCC Chairman Ajit Pai, who along with Commissioner Mike O'Rielly and National Association of Broadcasters EVP of Communications Dennis Wharton, had supported the changes in an effort to allow media companies to consolidate television, radio, and newspapers entities in order to avoid financial difficulties and possible shutdowns or closures due to increasing competition from other platforms. The FCC plans to appeal the decision.	
23	A series of financial conflicts between Wichita-based company Allied Media Partners and Rocking M Media over the March sale and LMA of the latter's properties (country KKGQ—Newton, rhythmic Hot AC KWME and AC KLEY/K262CQ—Wellington, "Bob FM" KIBB—Haven, AAA KVWF—Augusta, and talk KKLE—Winfield) has resulted in Rocking M taking the stations off the air and cancelling the LMA with Allied despite the sale already approved by the FCC in May but has yet to close; As of October 1, Allied Media Partners ceased operations on the outlets and its staff was dismissed. Both companies are offering different explanations; Rocking M's Monte Miller told Radio Television Business Report that he took the stations off the air and that the sale is off, while Allied told listeners of each station that technical issues, and that Rocking M's refusal to clear the debt from the stations, had caused the silence.	
23	Federated Media fired WBYT—Elkhart/South Bend morning host Jim Mackey after apparently not showing up for the country station's 25th Birthday Party concert on September 22, instead opting to go to his daughter's wedding. Mackey, who had been with WBYT since October 2016, was given time off two days for the wedding but not for the concert and he had only given them two weeks notice ahead of time. A friend of Mackey's wrote that he offered to show up late to the concert on Sunday, but that was rejected by station management; the news has sparked outrage from listeners accusing WBYT of forcing Mackey to appear at a function instead of allowing him to spend more time with family. Ironically, both Mackey and co-host Deb Miles (who remains in mornings until a new co-host is announced), were just nominated by the Country Music Association for Best Small Market Morning Show in the 2019 event.	
25	Entercom's Radio.com adds Alpha Media's 183 stations and Salem Media's 115 stations to its platform, including their on-demand audio/podcasts, scheduled to be added in the coming weeks.	
26	Entercom becomes the first radio broadcasting company to announce a ban on all advertisements for electronic cigarettes, which have recently been linked to seven deaths and 400 cases of a new severe form of respiratory disease. This comes after warnings of the health hazards of the products from the Centers for Disease Control and Prevention, the American Medical Association, and the American Lung Association.	
30	After dropping CHR on September 27, followed by a weekend stunt with Christmas music, WNUZ—Mercersburg, Pennsylvania/Hagerstown, Maryland changes formats to classic hits as "92.1 The Goat" (as in "Greatest of all Time") and its call signs to WIKG.	

=== October ===
Date	Event	Source
1	WNNF—Cincinnati is the latest Cumulus Media country station to drop the Nash FM branding due to low ratings, as it rebrands as "Cat Country 94.1." Most of its lineup, including Nash FM's Ty Bentley and Blair Garner, remains intact.	
1	The 100th anniversary of WWV, a shortwave time and frequency standard station owned and operated by the National Institute of Standards and Technology, the oldest licensed American radio station.	
3	KZLB—Fort Dodge, Iowa drops classic rock and returned to active rock after seven years.	
3	99.9 Sun FM CHSU-FM—Kelowna, British Columbia rebrands to Virgin Radio, becoming the latest Bell Media station to adopt the "Virgin Radio" branding. The station's format still remains CHR.	
7	Stingray Radio rebrands two of its stations in rural Alberta, CKWY-FM—Wainwright and CJEG-FM—Bonnyville, to the "Hot" format.	
9	Bob Kingsley announces his departure from Country Top 40 to undergo treatment for bladder cancer. During his absence, Kingsley struck an agreement with the Country Music Association to provide guest hosts for the program, all of whom will be women, through at least December 1. Kingsley died a week later.	
10	KCJK—Garden City/Kansas City transitioned from alternative to a hybrid alternative/active rock direction (calling it "Rockternative"), and rebrands from "X105.1" to "105.1 The X."	
14	KQFC—Boise end its run with country with a flip to Gold-based Soft AC as "Magic 97.9." The flip brings the "Magic" branding back to the Idaho State Capitol city after a 10-year hiatus, when it was last used at then-CHR (now sports) sister KZMG from 1991 to 2009, and prior to that, then-CHR KBBK from 1984 to 1986 (that station is now country sister KIZN).	
14	Entercom adds four more markets to its growing list of Channel Q LBGTQ/Dance affiliates.	
14	WWYY/W234AX—Allentown drops alternative to simulcast country sister WCTO.	
15	KCMC/K300DW—Texarkana, Texas drops its simulcast of conservative talk sister KTFS-FM—Texarkana, Arkansas for CBS Sports Radio, billing itself as "107.9 The Fan."	
16	A pair of rival AM/FM translators in Gainesville flip to R&B-centric formats within hours of each other. The first came from WAJD/W255CV, who dropped Smooth Jazz for urban contemporary as "99 Jamz," putting it in competition with rhythmic Top 40 rival WTMG In response, WTMG's sister station WDVH/W231DH split from its Country FM sister and flipped to urban oldies as "R&B 94.1," with an emphasis on urban contemporary hits from the 1970s, 1980s, and 1990s to serve as a flanker for WTMG.	.
16	The Mainstay Station Trust, which holds several former Cumulus Media stations under their ownership which remain run by Cumulus, announces the sale of country station WPCK—Denmark/Green Bay to the Educational Media Foundation, which will convert the station to a non-commercial educational station license and likely carry either the K-Love or Air1 networks. On November 1, WPCK dropped country for good and began transitioning to its upcoming EMF-centric format by playing Christmas music, which comes just one day after AC rival WKZG made the shift to the temporary holiday format on October 31.	
17	WWMP—Waterbury/Burlington drops adult hits for active rock, billed as "Rock 103.3".	
18	After stunting for a day with all-Elton John songs (that was tied to the singer's 2020 concert stop in Des Moines), KMYR Ames drops Mainstream AC and the "More 104" branding for Soft AC as "104.1 EZ-FM" and changes call letters to KOEZ. The change comes full circle as it returns the "EZ" branding back to the station after 22 years, when it was dropped by Saga Communications in favor of "Lite 104.1" and then-new calls KLTI after it was acquired in 1997.	
25	WWIZ—West Middlesex, Pennsylvania drops its oldies format and begins stunting with Christmas music.	
30	For the second consecutive year, WTRV—Grand Rapids, Michigan becomes the first station confirmed not to be stunting to flip to Christmas music for the 2019 season, doing so at the same time as WLTC—Cusseta, Georgia.	
30	WGXI—Plymouth/Sheboygan, Wisconsin abandons its longtime adult standards format for a new Soft/Gold AC format with the launch of FM translator W253CW-Plymouth.	
31	Cumulus Media's KHTB—Ogden drops alternative after three years to simulcast CHR sister KENZ—Provo, giving the two Class C stations massive coverage across the Salt Lake Metropolitan Area.	

=== November ===
Date	Event	Source
1	Forever Media makes format changes in the Delmarva Peninsula. WNCL—Milford, Delaware moved its classic rock format to WYUS/W271CX, thus replacing the latter's ESPN Radio programming and has applied to move the WNCL call letters to WYUS and change calls of WNCL's 101.3 calls to WCHK-FM, who on November 1 flipped to a country format as "101.3 The Chicken" (in reference to the region's poultry industry), as well as releasing WNCL midday host Paula Sangeleer and replacing her with Westwood One voicetracker Maria Danza. Also, in nearby Salisbury, Maryland, WAVD—Ocean Pines has segued from its "Beach Music" mix back to classic hits, but its entire staff were released, except for middayer Leah Rizzo, who will focus exclusively on her position as morning co-host at Milford CHR WAFL.	
1	KSKI-FM—Sun Valley, Idaho drops adult album alternative for Christmas music, as it also prepares for a post-holiday flip.	
1	Vista Radio's CFCP-FM—Comox Valley, British Columbia returns to its former "Jet FM" branding after 5 years under The Goat branding but the station's active rock format remained unchanged.	
4	WQQO-HD2/W264AK—Sylvania/Toledo drops conservative talk (which took over the programming that was heard on the now-defunct WTOD) and returned to active rock as "100.7 The Zone." This will be the fourth time that "The Zone" branding has been used in Toledo, following WRWK—Delta (2001–2009), and twice at 100.7 (2010–2011 and 2012–2016).	
5	Another station joins the list of playing Christmas music ahead of a new format pending, as W233CM/WYCT-HD2—Pensacola fills the Holiday void until New Year's Day. Its previous ESPN Radio format had already relocated to sister station WEBY/W256DL in August.	
8	KYAP—Nunn/Fort Collins, Colorado breaks from a simulcast of oldies sister KJMP—Pierce to flip to classic country as "K96.9." The station is positioning as "Colorado's Throwback Country" with a broad playlist focusing on the 70s through 2000s, and will target older listeners who prefer current-based rival KUAD-FM, who had billed itself "K99" until February when it rebranded to "New Country 99.1."	
12	After 45 years, The University of Memphis will transfer its longtime Jazz outlet WUMR into a new nonprofit in collaboration with online newspaper The Daily Memphian and arts/retail space Crosstown Concourse. The deal, which is expected to be approved by the University of Memphis' Board of Trustees on December 4, will see the station expand its programming to include news, music and cultural programming. The station will continue to be student and volunteer run.	
14	For the second time in its 60 years as a country outlet, WKHX-FM—Atlanta rebrands as "New Country 101.5." The move, which ends a 39-year run as "Kicks 101.5," adopts a more current and Georgia-centric based direction along with a modified lineup.	
15	CHR KKOB-FM—Albuquerque rebrands as "93.3 The Q" and changed call letters to KOBQ. The move was done to allow its talk AM sister which had the same call letters to utilize the KKOB calls for its FM simulcast the following February.	
15	WNWV—Elyria/Cleveland's nine-year run with smooth jazz (and its second tenure with the format, the first from 1987 to 2009) came to an end with a flip to Christmas music, followed by a surprise announcement that the entire air staff was let go on December 6. At the same time, a viral marketing campaign begins throughout Greater Cleveland consisting of billboards asking, "WHO IS #JENY?"	
16	Conservative talk KNUS—Denver abruptly cancelled host Craig Silverman's program midway through his three-hour show (filling the remaining slot with news and syndicated shows from parent owner Salem Media) after he replayed a 2015 interview he conducted with President Donald Trump's confidant Roger Stone, who was convicted on November 15 of impeding investigators in a bid to protect the president. In the clip, Silverman told Stone that one thing that concerned him about Trump was his relationship with Roy Cohn, the president's former personal lawyer who helped Senator Joe McCarthy during the investigation into suspected communists in the 1950s. This interview would prompt Silverman to critique Trump's actions that he saw as disturbing and corrupt, favoring his support for the impeachment of the President and his support of former U.S. Ambassador to Ukraine Marie Yovanovitch, who has been testifying about how she has been a target of the President during the hearings. Silverman described his firing as "a sad day for Colorado and the First Amendment." The GM at KNUS denies that Silverman was fired and cited his appearance at a competitor (referring to his former station, KHOW) as a reason for his removal, although Silverman is not an employee of Salem and is independently under a different contract, meaning he could return to the station if he chose to, a claim Silverman has disputed, as the KNUS website returned an error message instead of his show page as an indication of the status of the program.	
21	Another rhythmic-centric format enters the fray in Fort Collins, as KJMP/K283CN drops oldies to launch rhythmic AC "Jump 104.5," with an emphasis on 1990s and 2000s. The flip puts the station in direct competition with the current-based KARS-FM, which itself had flipped from classic hits to rhythmic Top 40 this past September.	
21	After three years with classic hits and struggling ratings, WXXM—Madison shifts to adult hits while retaining the "Rewind 92.1" branding.	
22	After nearly 10 years, the first six at 93.9 (when it was KHJZ) then the last three at 99.1, K256AS—Honolulu dropped the rhythmic AC/classic hip hop "99.1 Jamz" format (which continued on KUBT-HD2 and on its own iHeart stream, rebranded as "Jamz Hawaii") and adopted a variation of the contemporary hit radio format focused on international hits (with a particular focus on K-pop), branded as "PoP! 99.1" (it also moved its primary sub channel to KUCD-HD2, replacing the active rock format). The Asian-focused format fills a void that was left behind by KORL-FM's HD sub channels in 2014 (When the K-pop format was at 97.1 HD3 and the J-pop format was at 107.5 HD4).	
25	Standard Media announces that it will acquire Waypoint Media, Sound Communications and all of their related sister companies for $60 million. The fifteen radio stations being purchased as part of the deal are located in Elmira, New York (AC WENY-FM/WENI-FM, classic hits WGMM, country WKPQ, and talk WENY/WENI), Olean, New York (active rock WQRS, CHR WMXO, country WZKZ/WOEN/W242CT, talk WGGO/W263CZ), and Lafayette, Indiana (adult hits WBPE, country WYCM, CHR WAZY-FM, and conservative talk WSHY/W282CJ). This is Standard's first entry into radio; its founder, Deborah McDermott, was primarily a television executive before purchasing Waypoint. Waypoint's news production operations (the former Independent News Network) in Little Rock, Arkansas will also be acquired as part of the sale, which is expected to close in the first quarter of 2020.	
27	WLGX—Louisville also joins the list of stations stunting with Christmas music, as it drops Adult Top 40 "100.5 Kiss-FM" after four years. They also join AC rival WVEZ in bringing Holiday music to the Kentuckiana area.	

=== December ===
Date	Event	Source
4	The San Francisco 49ers have suspended Tim Ryan, their radio color analyst for flagship stations KNBR/KNBR-FM—San Francisco, for suggesting that Baltimore Ravens quarterback Lamar Jackson had an edge on faking handoffs in the team's 20–17 win on December 3 against the 49ers because of his skin color during a review of the play by play on the station's "Murph and Mac" morning show. The comments was immediately condemned by the 49ers, who issued an apology to the Ravens organization. Ryan later apologized in a statement, saying "I regret my choice of words in trying to describe the conditions of the game. Lamar Jackson is an MVP-caliber player and I respect him greatly. I want to sincerely apologize to him and anyone else I offended."	
5	WWFD—Frederick, Maryland begins testing a second digital subchannel, the first attempt at multicasting on an AM frequency in North America. Until this point, AM radio was thought to have too narrow of a bandwidth to allow more than one signal (current U.S. policy requires the first digital signal match the content of the analog signal); WWFD has, under special dispensation from the FCC, broadcast solely on digital since July 2018. The 40 kHz bandwidth is split between a 3 kHz datacast and two digital monoaural signals, split 25/12 on the first test and 20/17 on the second. Current HD Radio receivers do not have the ability to access the second signal.	
5	Entercom's Kansas City outlets, country WDAF-FM and sports KCSP, are announced as the new home and flagship station for the Kansas City Chiefs for their 2020 season, ending a 30-year run at Cumulus Media classic rock station KCFX, whose last game ends up being the team's Super Bowl LIV victory over the San Francisco 49ers on February 2, 2020. Under the new deal WDAF-FM will carry all Chiefs games broadcasts with play-by-play voice Mitch Holthus remaining in place, while KCSP will carry weekly press conferences, a Monday night Chiefs Kingdom Radio Show hosted by Holthus with interviews with players and coaches, live broadcasts from training camp, and appearances by Chiefs players and staffers on station programming. With the AFC West franchise joining the lineup, it also gives KCSP a monopoly on Kansas City's top two professional sports teams that also includes the rights to Major League Baseball's Kansas City Royals.	
9	WNGY—Peoria drops classic hip hop for 80s/90s/2000s Gold-based rhythmic AC as "KZ102.3," thus bringing back the "KZ" branding that was last used at sister WPBG during the 1980s and 90s when it was WKZW.	
16	KDLD/KDLE—Los Angeles drops classic rock en Español "Super Estrella Retro" for Mexican Cumbia "Viva 103.1". The move resurrects the "Viva" brand that was last used at now sister simulcast KLYY/KSYY/KVYY that existed from 1999 through 2003 (when it was Regional Mexican) under the defunct Big City Radio ownership until it was acquired by Entravision.	
16	WAVV—Naples Park/Fort Myers, one of the last remaining Beautiful music outlets in existence in the United States, transitioned to Soft AC as it eliminates the remainder of the instrumentals it has featured for the majority of its history.	
17	Conservative talk KNUS—Denver fires afternoon host Chuck Bonniwell and his wife Julie Hayden and cancelled their program altogether, after Bonniwell made a statement that he wished for "a nice school shooting" to interrupt coverage of "the never-ending impeachment of Donald Trump", only to have Hayden try to clarify to listeners, "No, no, don't even say that! Don't call us! Chuck didn't say that." Appearing to retract his statement, Bonniewell said he was talking about shootings in "which no one would be hurt." Although Bonniwell did issue an apology saying it was meant to be a joke, the management at the Salem Media outlet felt his choice of words (as the Denver Metropolitan area has been the scene of major mass shootings) was inappropriate and bringing his show back would do more harm than good. This is the second time in over a month that the station had to fire on air personalities for making statements that was out of line with Salem's policies regarding its handling of conservative issues by its staffers.	
20	Cynthia Canty retires from broadcasting after 40 years on the air which includes stints on Michigan Radio and Detroit stations WMUZ-FM, WNIC, WDTX-FM, and WMGC-FM. April Baer will take over hosting her Michigan Radio show Stateside on January 6.	
23	Seven Mountains Media announces plans to acquire the assets of Europa Communications and Equinox Broadcasting, two station clusters based entirely in the Twin Tiers of New York and Pennsylvania. Seven Mountains already controls the former Community Broadcasters/Backyard Broadcasting cluster in the same region and will add to that WMTT—Tioga, Pennsylvania; WPHD—Elmira, New York and WZHD—Canaseraga, New York, among a slew of translators, pending FCC approval. The moves would leave Seven Mountains Media and Standard Media (presuming their purchase of Waypoint Media completes) as the two dominant clusters in Elmira.	
24	WPHI-FM—Philadelphia rebrands from "Boom 103.9" to "Hip-Hop 103.9", as it refocused from a mixture of recurrent and current urban contemporary to a more straight ahead current-based hip-hop direction.	
25	WWFW—Fort Wayne is the first station in 2019 to make the post-Christmas Day format flip after playing Holiday music, as the former Soft AC returns with adult hits as "103.9 Wayne FM."	
25	WSVU/W233CJ/W269DS—West Palm Beach which became the first of several stations to start stunting with Christmas music early on November 1 (billing itself as "Rudolph's Radio"), returns with mainstream rock, billing itself as "Surf 92.5 & 101.7." The Vic Latino-owned station had programmed the syndicated "True Oldies" format, which is now being broadcast via WIRK-HD3/W240CI/W295BJ.	
26	K231BV/KIYS-HD2—Walnut Ridge, Arkansas (serving Jonesboro), which dropped active rock and began stunting with Christmas music on November 18, returns with adult hits and adopts the Bob FM branding.	
26	KYYA—Billings, which dropped talk in November and began stunting with Christmas music with the sign on of FM translator K251CI (filling a void after having flipped AC sister KYSX to active rock in January 2019), returns with oldies and revived the "K-Bear" moniker.	
26	WLTM—Mina, New York/Erie, Pennsylvania, which dropped AC November 5, became the third iHeartMedia outlet (and the first station in North America) to adopt the podcast format on the FM dial.	
26	WXXF—Mansfield, Ohio, which had simulcasted country sister WFXN-FM until November when it began its Christmas music stunt, launched a soft adult contemporary format, branded as "107.7 The Breeze".	
26	Former ESPN Radio affiliate WAVL—Wausau ended its Christmas music stunt and launched an adult contemporary format, branded as "Wave 100.5".	
26	In western Minnesota, former AC KRVY-FM—Starbuck/Willmar, which also stunted with Christmas music, also flipped to a Variety hits format branded as "The New 97.3 The Kangaroo."	
26	After two weeks of stunting with Christmas Music without any explanation, WSTR—Atlanta returns to Adult Top 40 but made adjustments to feature recurrents from the 2000s and 2010s.	
26	After playing Christmas music for most of December, Cape 94.9 CKPE-FM—Sydney, Nova Scotia, rebrands to "94.9 The Wave" as it flips from Hot AC to classic hits.	
29	Tegna Inc. spins off the San Diego combo of talk KFMB and adult hits KFMB-FM to Local Media for $5 million. The deal will include a 10-year transmitter lease with Tegna for $102,000 plus an annual increase with two five-year renewal options. As part of the arrangement, Local must relinquish the rights to the KFMB call letters and will be given thirty days following closing to wind down use of the call letters and KFMB branding but may use them in connection of the transition of relationships with radio media buying agencies and other accounts for a period of up to one year following the closing date. Both outlets will retain their formats and reunite them with Local's Mexican-leased properties XETRA-FM, XHITZ-FM, and XHRM-FM, for this first time since 2015.	
31	WMYI—Greenville, South Carolina, which dropped AC and released its airstaff on October 31 to stunt with Christmas music, became the latest iHeartMedia outlet to adopt the adult hits "The Lake" branding.	

== Debuts ==
Date	Event	Source
January 1	Netflix licenses their library of stand-up comedy specials to SiriusXM for an audio-only channel under the "Netflix Is A Joke Radio" channel banner.	
January 1	Sebastian Gorka launched a new program on Salem Radio Network, which cancels The Michael Medved Show at the same time. Medved will continue his show online, and as a local show on KTTH, until he finds another terrestrial network.	
January 7	Cumulus Media launched a new morning program, Rick and Sasha, hosted by Rick Party and Sasha The Diva, on urban AC outlets.	
March 2	Westwood One launched a new weekly entertainment/pop culture program, With Elaina, hosted by Nash FM personality Elaina Smith, on country stations.	
July 15	Benztown and Promo Only launched Hot Mix: The Afterhours, an EDM/Dance mix program that will supplement its Hot Mix CHR and rhythmic Top 40 versions to stations.	
August 5	The BetR Network, a spin-off of SB Nation Radio launched in partnership with Vegas Stats & Information Network, launched. The network focuses primarily on sports betting, making it the first full-time radio network devoted to sports betting, and launched in Las Vegas and Atlantic City, both known for their numerous casinos.	
August 5	Entercom launched Dance/EDM channel "FireLane" on its Radio.com platform, with KAMP-HD3—Los Angeles serving as the flagship station after a soft launch in March. The format will feature DJ mixes 24/7 that encompasses today's "festival tent" feel with rhythmic, dance, hip hop and EDM all being represented."	
August 11	iHeartRadio launched Sunday Night Podcasts across 270 stations in the CHR, Hot AC, country, rock, Urban, and talk formats.	
August 14	SummitMedia began expanding rhythmic Top 40 WHZT—Greenville, South Carolina's Dex and Barbie T morning program to rhythmic sister WKHT—Knoxville, marking the company's first in-house syndicated show.	
August 17	iHeartRadio launched Hollywood Unlocked with Jason Lee, a two-hour entertainment program featuring "celebrity news, information and gossip, along with candid conversations with the stars who will bring truth to the latest stories and rumors" hosted by Hollywood Unlocked CEO Jason Lee, Melyssa Ford, and DJ Damage, on urban contemporary stations. An uncensored podcast version will also be available on iHeartMedia's online platform.	
September 9	Unanimo Deportes, a new Spanish-language sports network founded by former ESPN Deportes General Manager Lino García and former ESPN Deportes Radio Program Director Gerardo Quirama, debuts with a number of former ESPN Deportes talent involved. The network signs up stations that were once affiliated with ESPN Deportes Radio up until its September 8 shutdown.	
October 15	Mexican-American actress/singer Angélica Vale, best known for her work with Mexico's Televisa and TV Azteca, as well as her starring role on La Fea Más Bella (of which led to a cameo on its American equivalent Ugly Betty), made her foray into American radio as a midday host at KLLI—Los Angeles on this date.	
November 11	Townsquare Media and co-owned publication XXL launched XXL Higher Level Radio, a nightly hip-hop centric program, on its rhythmic and urban contemporary stations.	
December 18	XHLNC-FM—Tijuana/San Diego returned to the air with Spanish rhythmic hits under the "Mas Flo 104.9" branding, which is being programmed from Los Angeles under licensee MLC Media.	

== Endings ==
Date	Event	Source
January 1	After seven years, NBC Sports Radio switched to a stripped-down syndication service format, ending their run as a full-time network as multiple factors have made offering a full-time network cost-prohibitive. :00/:30 past the hour sportscasts continues to be offered, along with the morning show Pro Football Talk Live with Mike Florio and a new afternoon show The Daily Line with Michael Jenkins and Tim Murray. Hosts Newy Scruggs, Keith Irizarry, Mark Malone, and Dan Schwartzman will lose their programs as a part of the switch. The switchover also resulted in several affiliates (like KHKA—Honolulu) to join Westwood One's co-distributor CBS Sports Radio to fill the void.	
January 14	Oldies WAIK—Galesburg, Illinois ceased broadcasting after 61 years. The shutdown was due to the buyer of its sister stations WRAM/W231DA and WMOI not receiving any rights or recovery from a series of lawsuits involving the WAIK tower.	
January 31	Urban AC "Mix 87.7" Atlanta signed off the air, due to television station WTBS-LD turned off its companion channel 6 analog signal, which could be heard on most radios on 87.7 FM.	
February 28	After an eleven-year run Sports Talk with Bo Mattingly, which aired on sports stations across Arkansas and focuses on University of Arkansas Athletics, aired its final broadcast due to parent distributor Sport and Story moving its focus to film production and podcasting.	
February 28	Broadcast Company of the Americas officially ceased operations on classic hits "105.7 Max-FM," which was under a leasing agreement via XHPRS-FM—Tijuana to serve San Diego. The station had been programming with no imaging or advertising since December 2018 and released its air staff in January after a dispute with Mexican businessman/owner Jaime Bonilla Valdez over the leasing contract, resulting in Valdez cancelling the arrangement altogether.	
April 1	The New York Mets Radio Network abruptly ceases operations. WCBS, a maximum power clear-channel station that can be received in most of the Eastern United States at night, now exclusively airs all games.	
April 4	The Federal Communications Commission revokes the license of WJDF—Orange, Massachusetts for not paying regulatory fees since 2014, as well as a lack of response to warnings regarding the unpaid fees. Steve Wendell, who operated the station under a local marketing agreement with plans to acquire it outright, subsequently announces his intention to file a $1.8 million lawsuit against owner Deane Brothers Broadcasting, as he had not been informed of the unpaid fees (which prevented renewal of the WJDF license and the proposed license transfer).	
April 10	Sports XEPRS—Rosarito, Baja California, Mexico (serving San Diego) is taken off the air by the Bichara family, who had leased the station to Broadcast Company of the Americas. The signal is replaced with a simulcast of KJAV—Alamo/McAllen, Texas, which is owned by Bichara's Bi-Media Corporation.	
April 12	ESPN Radio affiliate WRDW—Augusta, Georgia signs off the air after Beasley Broadcasting sold the land where the tower is located but has not yet secured a new transmitter site. Beasley also moves WRDW's Atlanta Braves baseball broadcasts over to Gospel sister station WGUS-FM.	
May 31	Cumulus Media's Hot AC sisters WRQX—Washington, D.C., WPLJ—New York City, and WZAT—Savannah, classic rock WXTL—Syracuse, talk WYAY—Gainesville/Atlanta, and adult album alternative KFFG—San Jose, signed off the air as commercial-licensed stations as the Educational Media Foundation took over ownership of the newly acquired properties. The stations flipped to EMF's K-Love network. Meanwhile, WRQX's format and "Mix" moniker is expected to be acquired by another station in Washington due to being a heritage brand in the market, but after its sign off it directed listeners to CHR WIHT instead; the WRQX calls supplanted the WSOM calls in Salem, Ohio, while WXTL's "The Rebel" brand moved online ahead of the turnover.	
May 31	WQUN, a community radio station owned by Quinnipiac University, ceased broadcasting.	
June 19	Access.1 Communications ended its tenure of owning radio stations with the sale of KCUL-FM—Marshall/Longview, Texas to RCA Broadcasting and KSYR—Benton/Shreveport to Coochie Brake Broadcasting. Both had been simulcasting Regional Mexican KOYE—Frankston/Tyler, Texas through a LMA with Alpha Media, who had intended to buy the stations but the deal fell through although Alpha did acquire Access.1's other properties. The sale now leaves Access.1 with American Urban Radio Networks and SupeRadio Networks while a 2015 sale of WGYM—Hammonton, New Jersey to Domestic Church Media is still awaiting closing due to judgment liens of the property and repairs needed to be made.	
July 15	Trine University's alternative WEAX—Angola, Indiana signed off the air and moved its programming to online. The move came with increased programming to be produced by the school's Department of Humanities and Communication, including a podcast network.	
August 16	After 72 years, conservative talk KQTY—Borger, Texas ceased operations. Most of its local programming moved over to classic country sister KQTY-FM.	
August 18	After 50 years, country WEBS/W278CD—Calhoun, Georgia ceased operations due to foreclosure from a failure to pay off a loan, as a local bank takes over the station from owner Ken Payne.	
August 30	After a 50-year run in radio, including a 10-year stint as a weekend sports anchor at WHEC-TV, Steve Hausmann retired from country WBEE-FM—Rochester, New York, where he joined in 2001 and then became co-host of "The Bee Morning Coffee Club" since 2004, on this date.	
September 6	Nevada Public Radio shuts down adult album alternative KVNV—Sun Valley/Reno after two years due to a budget shortfall, the resignation of Nevada Public Radio CEO Flo Rogers, and a pending sale of its properties. The station will temporarily simulcast its Las Vegas NPR/news sister KNPR-FM until a sale is announced.	
September 8	ESPN Deportes Radio ceased operations and shifts its programs to podcast delivery including Jorge Ramos y Su Banda and Raza Deportiva, along with 10 additional Spanish language podcasts. The closure laid off 10 full-time and 25 part-time employees as ESPN closed its Coral Gables, Florida offices. Several key affiliates have already found new formats or affiliates to fill the void ahead of the shutdown (most of its former outlets switching to Univision's TUDN Radio or newly upstart Unanimo Deportes), while New York City's WEPN switched back to the English-language ESPN Radio feed.	
October 1	KKGQ, KWME, KIBB, KVWF, KLEY and KKLE, six stations in the Wichita, Kansas area, simultaneously shut down after financial problems prevented its previous owner from closing on a sale of the station cluster. The stations' licenses are still active as options are explored regarding their future pending legal action.	
October 7	The Pacifica Foundation ceased local operations on WBAI—New York City, due to financial and legal issues that has plagued the station (since Pacifica acquired it in 1960) that saw its staff dismissed and programs cancelled (including the news department), default on rental payments to the owners of the Empire State Building, foreclosure and repossession of its equipment that was averted via an emergency loan to pay off outstanding and mounting debts, a leasing deal with a community operator fall through, and reaching a settlement to relocate their transmissions to 4 Times Square. WBAI will remain on the air with a mix of programming from Pacifica's other stations and the syndication market for the foreseeable future, promising to return if and when Pacifica resolves its financial problems. Pacifica staffers received a temporary injunction ordering Pacifica to resume local operations (they argued Pacifica's actions were illegal under Article 78 of the New York Civil Practice Law, Section 1315 of the Not For Profit Corporation Law and Pacifica's bylaws), but the WBAI studio had already been dismantled by the next morning, making compliance impossible. The battle has led to a back and forth legal limbo between the United States Federal Court and Supreme Court of the State of New York, with an extension of the Temporary Restraining Order keeping the current status quo until unless the state court modifies or terminates it. On November 6, Manhattan Supreme Court Justice Melissa Crane ruled that the Pacifica Foundation must return control of WBAI to its local staff immediately, even as Pacifica plans to enforce the injunction and plans to appeal the decision.	
October 18	WBT/WBT-FM—Charlotte afternoon host John Hancock retired from radio for health reasons. Hancock had been a fixture in the Charlotte radio market since 1990 as well as working at stations in Denver, Jacksonville, and Scranton-Wilkes Barre prior to his first of his two tenures at WBT (1990–99; 2001–2019) and alternative WEND (1999-2001).	
October 18	Talk WFPA—Fort Payne, Alabama was forced off the air and its transmitter is silenced (and taken down later in the afternoon) by its landlord due to failure of payments. The shutdown occurred during the Fox News Radio-affiliated station's morning show, in which host Steve Malcolm noted that deputies from the DeKalb County Sheriff's Office served the eviction notice while it was on air. While owner Mike Wallace (no relation the CBS News journalist with the same name or his son Fox News host Chris Wallace) is planning to put WFPA back on the air, it appears the station knew it would be evicted as one listener set up a GoFundMe fundraiser for WFPA prior to the eviction, while another commented that she heard them discussing it would be going off the air.	
November 1	After nearly 10 years, Ryan LaCosse, who has worked at Cumulus Media's Peoria outlets as digital director and as an air staffer for rhythmic Top 40 WZPW (as morning host "ORyan") and active rock sister WIXO (as midday host "Ryan Black"), left broadcasting to become Illinois Area Director for Best Buddies International.	
November 8	After a 32-year partnership that began at KZZP—Phoenix, and a 30-year run in mornings at alternative KROQ-FM—Los Angeles, Gene "Bean" Baxter left the Kevin and Bean show to return to his native England, where he has hosted his portion of the show remotely (first from Washington state and later New Orleans) since 1999. His partner Kevin Ryder is expected to continue in a solo capacity.	
November 15	After 34 years working in numerous air shifts, most recently in mornings, Mark Daniels exited AC WALK-FM—Patchogue, New York on the same day as the station's annual switch to Christmas music. His partner Jamie Morris will handle solo duties until a new show debuts in January 2020.	
December 13	The Tom Joyner Morning Show ended after 25 years, concluding host Tom Joyner's 50-year career in broadcasting.	
December 20	The morning team of John Erickson and Bruce Murdock announced that they both retired from iHeartMedia AC KKCW—Portland on this date. Both men have worked together and separately in the Portland and Seattle markets since the 1970s.	
December 31	The Mike Harvey Show ended after 36 years as host Mike Harvey retires. Harvey had been hosting the oldies program SuperGold continuously in syndication since 1983. Existing affiliates was transitioned to Throwback Nation, a 1980s/1990s centered program hosted by Tony Lorino.	

== Deaths ==
Date	Name	Age	Nationality and notability	Source
January 1	Joe Stapelton	55	American radio personality based in the Boston area (traffic reporter on WBZ and performer on WAAF's Hill-Man Morning Show). Also film actor.	
January 4	Wiet Van Broeckhoven	69	Belgian radio presenter and writer. Hosted the shows Njam Njam and Hitbox on Radio 2. Was also active as a humorist writer.	
January 7	Jimmy Hannan	84	Australian radio and TV personality (3UZ)	
January 18	Brian Stowell	82	Manx linguist, physicist, author, and radio personality (Manx Radio)	
January 25	Brittney Cason	39	American radio personality and freelance journalist (CBS Sports Radio, KOMP—Las Vegas and WNKS—Charlotte)	
January 29	Sari Seppälä	50	Finnish radio presenter and journalist (Radio Nova).	
February 1	Jon Anderson	76	American radio talk show host (KGUM—Hagåtña, Guam)	
February 1	Jeremy Hardy	57	English comedian and radio host/panelist (The News Quiz, I'm Sorry I Haven't a Clue, Jeremy Hardy Speaks to the Nation)	
February 4	Gary LaPierre	76	American radio journalist (WBZ—Boston)	
February 5	George Klein	83	American DJ (WLFP—Memphis and SiriusXM)	
February 9	Bruce Williams	86	American Hall of Fame talk show host, specializing in personal finances; hosted The Bruce Williams Show nationwide from 1981 to 2010	
February 14	David Horowitz	81	American consumer advocate, host of Fightback Talkback on the USA Radio Network.	
February 16	Ken Nordine	98	American poet and radio voice-over artist, host of Word Jazz on WBEZ—Chicago	
February 16	Jerry Blum	86	American GM/president of WQXI and WQXI-FM—Atlanta, Georgia from 1960 to 1989; famously parodied as Arthur Carlson on WKRP in Cincinnati	
February 24	Mac Wiseman	93	American country musician and disc jockey (WSVA—Harrisonburg, Virginia; directed the WWVA Jamboree from 1966 to 1970 and was a regular on the Old Dominion Barn Dance in the early 1960s)	
February 28	André Previn	89	German-born American pianist, composer, arranger, and conductor	
March 10	Rex Sorensen	73	American broadcaster, television/radio executive, and real estate developer (co-founder of Air America Radio)	
March 16	Tom Hatten	92	American entertainment reporter (KNX—Los Angeles)	
March 18	Augusto Victa	87	Filipino radio drama actor (Philippine Radio)	
March 20	Wolfgang Miller	44	American sportscaster, co-host of The Drive With Wolfgang and Steen on KBGG—Des Moines	
March 20	Jacqueline Rossetti	65	American radio/television personality, broadcaster, and programmer in the Honolulu market (known on air as "Honolulu Skylark"), notably as co-host/emcee for The Merrie Monarch Festival broadcasts and co-founder/host of the Na Hoku Hanohano Awards. Alumnus of Honolulu outlets KNDI, KCCN, and KCCN-FM; and Hilo, Hawaii stations KWXX-FM and KAPA.	
March 21	Chris Corley	55	American voice-over artist at numerous radio stations	
March 26	Fuyumi Shiraishi	82	Japanese actress and radio announcer	
March 31	Ermias Asghedom	33	Eritrean American rapper, remixer, entrepreneur, philanthropist, and actor, known by his stage name Nipsey Hussle (Mix show contributor for KPWR—Los Angeles)	
April 2	Bill Heine	74	British radio presenter (BBC Radio Oxford)	
April 6	Jim Glaser	81	American country musician (along with his brothers, a member of the Grand Ole Opry)	
April 17	Chet Coppock	70	American journalist (WMAQ—Chicago) and sports radio personality (Sporting News Radio)	
April 23	Jim Dunbar	89	American radio program director (KGO—San Francisco) and DJ (WXYZ—Detroit, WDSU—New Orleans, and WLS—Chicago)	
April 30	Fitzroy Gordon	65	Jamaican-born Canadian radio broadcaster (CKFG-FM)	
May 1	Maa Afia Konadu	67	Ghanaian broadcaster (host of "Asomdwe Nkomo" on Peace FM)	
May 2	Mike Williamson	90	Australian runner and sports commentator (3AK and 3AW)	
May 13	Doris Day	97	American singer and actress whose career dated to the Golden Age of Radio era (radio work included an eponymous program, Carlin's Carnival on WLW and The Bob Hope Show)	
May 16	Steve Duemig	64	American golfer and sportscaster (Fox Sports Radio, WDAE—Tampa, Florida and WFNS—Blackshear, Georgia) and color commentator (Tampa Bay Lightning)	
May 17	Herman Wouk	103	American writer (radio work included gags for The Fred Allen Show)	
May 21	Dave Bookman	58	Canadian DJ at Toronto stations CFNY-FM and CIND-FM	
June 1	John Myers	60	British radio executive (GMG Radio, Radio Academy)	
June 4	Humble Harve Miller	84	Los Angeles radio personality and convicted murderer	
June 16	Zappy Max	97	French broadcaster (Radio Luxembourg) and actor	
June 20	Abdiel Gonzalez	47	Puerto rican radio DJ, voice-over artist and host of "El Jukeo" on WRXD, worked for radio stations WEGA, WMEG and WOYE	
June 21	Avelino Muñoz Stevenson	62	Puerto Rican sports journalist, and father of Jowell Muñoz. Served as a contributor of programs at WIAC, WIPR, WSKN and WVOZ. Also worked as an announcer for basketball and volleyball events.	
June 21	Eamon Friel	70	Northern Irish singer, songwriter and broadcaster (BBC Radio Ulster, BBC Radio Foyle).	
July 1	John Walton	67	American radio host (co-host of the regionally syndicated Walton & Johnson) and station owner (KXXF—Winnie/Beaumont, Texas)	
July 7	Bob Fouts	97	American sportscaster (San Francisco 49ers Radio Network)	
July 29	Max Falkenstien	95	American radio sportscaster (Kansas Jayhawks)	
August 8	Malcolm T. Elliott	73	Australian host on several stations	
August 11	Jim Cullum Jr.	77	American jazz musician, music preservationist, and host of Riverwalk Jazz on Public Radio International	
August 26	Reb Foster	84	American radio DJ (KRLA and KYA) and band manager (The Turtles, Three Dog Night, Steppenwolf)	
August 26	Felix Donnelly	89	New Zealand Catholic priest, social activist, academic (University of Auckland), and radio talkback host (Radio Pacific)	
September 13	Eddie Money	70	American singer/songwriter, actor, and reality television personality (host of "Money in the Morning" on WSRV Atlanta)	
September 16	Vic Vogel	84	Canadian jazz pianist, composer, arranger, trombonist, and conductor	
September 17	Cokie Roberts	75	American journalist (political reporter and analyst for Morning Edition on NPR)	
October 4	Margaret Lyons	95	Canadian radio executive	
October 6	Jeff Silberman	66	American entertainment, broadcasting, and media journalist (Billboard Radio Monitor, All Access Music Group, Network 40, and Hitmakers)	
October 6	Larry Junstrom	70	American amateur radio operator (call sign K4EB) and bass guitarist (Lynyrd Skynyrd, 38 Special)	
October 17	Bob Kingsley	80	American country music radio host and producer (American Country Countdown, Bob Kingsley's Country Top 40)	
October 27	Tony Bombardo	78	American traffic reporter (last helicopter-based traffic reporter in the Syracuse, New York area, with stints at WHEN as "Scott King" and WSEN under his own name)	
October 30	Julian Keane	57	British radio presenter (BBC World Service)	
November 4	Gay Byrne	85	Irish broadcaster (The Gay Byrne Show)	
November 5	Dominique Farran	72	French radio host and music journalist (RTL)	
November 5	Jan Erik Kongshaug	75	Norwegian sound engineer, jazz guitarist, and composer, Eurovision contestant	
November 6	Tazeen Ahmad	48	British reporter on BBC World Service, BBC Radio 4, and BBC Radio 5 Live	
November 15	Papa Don Schroeder	78	American radio station owner (WPNN—Pensacola, Florida) and record producer	
November 18	Sam Williams	93	American host at Flint, Michigan stations WAMM and WDZZ-FM	
December 4	Don Chiodo	54	American sportscaster (WCEN-FM—Mount Pleasant, Michigan) and announcer (Central Michigan Chippewas).	
December 5	Leon Cole	79	Canadian musician and radio presenter.	
December 18	Alain Barrière	84	French singer, Eurovision contestant	
December 27	Don Imus	79	American broadcaster, shock jock and host of Imus in the Morning (WGAR and WHK—Cleveland, WNBC/WFAN and WABC—New York City)	
December 29	Neil Innes	75	British comedy musician	
