= KGGG =

KGGG may refer to:

- the ICAO code for East Texas Regional Airport, in Longview, Texas, United States
- KVWF, a radio station (100.5 FM) licensed to Augusta, Kansas, United States, which held the call sign KGGG during February 2008
