= KKLE =

- Winfield, Kansas; United States
- Frequency: 1550 kHz
- Branding: The Dawg 1550

Programming
- Format: Classic Rock

Ownership
- Owner: Murfin Media; (My Town Media, Inc)
- Sister stations: KBOB-FM, KLEY, KMMM, KSMM, KVWF, KWME

History
- First air date: August 10, 1963

Technical information
- Licensing authority: FCC
- Facility ID: 31892
- Class: D
- Power: 250 watts day 52 watts night
- Transmitter coordinates: 37°14′11″N 97°01′31″W

Links
- Public license information: Public file; LMS
- Webcast: Listen Live
- Website: Official website

KKLE (1550 AM) is a radio station in Winfield, Kansas, and is owned by My Town Media Inc.

== History ==
On March 29, 2019, Rocking M announced they would sell KKLE and its five sister stations in the Wichita/Wellington/Winfield area to Allied Media Partners, a local group owned by Matt Baty and Tommy Castor, for $6.2 million. Allied Media Partners took over the stations via a local marketing agreement on April 1. The FCC approved the sale in late May; however, the sale was not consummated due to Allied Media Partners’ condition that Rocking M would clear all liens and outstanding debt on the stations in order for the sale to be completed. The completion date would be delayed a few more times, with a final scheduled completion date of October 31. On September 23, 2019, Envision, Inc., who owns the building that houses the station's studios, would lock the doors, denying staff members access to the station and offices; the non-profit organization claimed that Rocking M was behind in their lease agreement. In response, Rocking M took each station off the air that day as well. A week later, Allied Media Partners announced it would cease operations, and let go all employees, putting the future of the stations in jeopardy. On October 11, Envision filed a lawsuit against Rocking M in Harvey County District Court, claiming that Rocking M did not meet a payment schedule related to sister station KKGQ's sale in 2017 and owed the company money (Envision sought $1.25 million plus interest, costs and attorneys’ fees). It also wanted a sheriff's sale of property related to the station and demanded that Rocking M deliver all collateral to Envision. On November 6, Envision filed a second lawsuit against Rocking M in Sedgwick County District Court for failing to vacate the building that houses their stations' studios, along with leaving behind damaged property and failing to pay rent for parking spaces. In return, Rocking M filed a complaint with the FCC, hoping that the agency would force Envision to allow access back to the stations' studios, as well as to fine the company. In addition, Rocking M has stated that it hopes to still sell KKLE and its five sister stations. On August 28, 2020, the Harvey County District Court ruled in favor of Envision, awarding the company $1.2 million plus interest for what it said was Rocking M's breach of contract.

On August 11, 2020, KKLE returned to the air, operating from studios in Wellington, but would fall silent again on August 25. A suspension of operations/silent temporary authority filing was not submitted until October, with Rocking M citing a shortage of operating funds resulting from the COVID-19 pandemic, along with inadvertence from the company's marketing and facilities manager, as the reasons behind the request. The STA request was approved on November 25, 2020. Rocking M would have August 24, 2021 to return KKLE to air. On December 23, 2021, Rocking M agreed to a Consent Decree with a $7,000 fine to settle the license renewal applications for KKLE, KIBB, KWME, KVWF and KLEY, and to complete the sale of KKGQ to Pinnacle Media. Rocking M admitted in its license renewal applications that all six stations were silent for periods of time without STA's filed or granted by the FCC. As part of the Consent Decree, the stations will all be given conditional one year license renewals as opposed to the usual seven-year term. On March 26, 2022, Rocking M filed for Chapter 11 bankruptcy protection, claiming $1,307,696.75 in assets and $22,365,886.40 in liabilities owed between its four holding companies. Bankruptcy attorney Sharon Stolte of Sandberg Phoenix & von Gontard, who is representing the company, told The Wichita Eagle: “We filed on Saturday, and we are hoping to reorganize. We will sell some of the stations that we find are not profitable, and we will reorganize the debt with the remaining stations.” In addition, the lawsuit between Rocking M and Allied Media Partners will go to trial in June 2022. On July 29, Rocking M announced they would partner with Patrick Communications to market and engage a sale of Rocking M's Wichita, Wellington and Winfield stations (including KKLE), as well as 7 other stations in Kansas, through an auction; bids were then accepted until September 27, with the auction set to take place in October. KKLE began airing the adult hits format (from Local Radio Networks' "Mix" format) originating on KWME and broadcasting on the aforementioned stations that were planned to be sold in August. On October 31, it was announced that Pittsburg-based MyTown Media was the winning bidder for KKLE and Rocking M's Wichita and Wellington stations for $1.18 million; the company was also the winning bidder for two stations in Liberal and Pratt. While the bankruptcy court has approved the purchases, the sale was officially filed with the FCC on February 2, 2023.

The sale to MyTown Media was approved by the FCC on March 29, 2023, and was consummated on May 12. In September 2023, KKLE began airing an all-bluegrass music format, branded as "The Bluegrass Express", a nod to Winfield's annual Walnut Valley Festival, which features bluegrass and acoustic artists. In March 2026, the station flipped to classic rock as The Rock of Kansas, networking with sister stations KSNP/Burlington, KKOY-FM/Chanute, KSEK/Pittsburg, and KIND-FM/Elk City–Independence. In August 2026, the stations dropped the "Rock of Kansas" branding due to a cease and desist from Audacy, Inc. for trademark infringement over the "Rock of Kansas" slogan (which it owns in connection to KQRC-FM), quietly rebranding to The Dawg.

== Previous logos ==
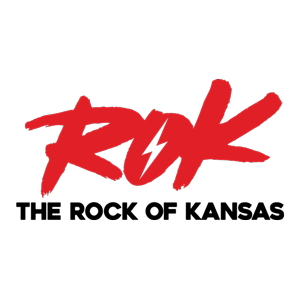
