= KVWF =

Radio station in Augusta–Wichita, Kansas

- Augusta, Kansas; United States
- Broadcast area: Wichita, Kansas
- Frequency: 100.5 MHz
- Branding: 100.5 The Twister

Programming
- Format: Country

Ownership
- Owner: Murfin Media; (My Town Media Inc)
- Sister stations: KBOB-FM; KKLE; KLEY; KMMM; KSMM; KWME

History
- First air date: March 30, 2006 (as KIBB)
- Former call signs: KPLN (1/20/2006 - 3/09/2006, CP); KZLN (3/09/2006 - 3/30/2006, CP); KIBB (3/30/2006 - 2/13/2008); KGGG (2/13/2008-2/21/2008)
- Call sign meaning: WF = "Wolf" (former branding)

Technical information
- Licensing authority: FCC
- Facility ID: 164106
- Class: C3
- ERP: 25,000 watts
- HAAT: 84 meters
- Transmitter coordinates: 37°44′13.00″N 97°9′25.00″W

Links
- Public license information: Public file; LMS
- Webcast: Listen Live
- Website: The Twister Online

KVWF (100.5 FM) is a radio station licensed to Augusta, Kansas, United States. The station serves the Wichita area. The station is currently owned by MyTown Media. The station's studios are located in downtown Wichita and the transmitter is in Andover.

== Frequency history ==
=== 'Bob FM', country formats ===
KVWF is the newest and most recent station to sign on in Wichita. The station would officially sign on the air on March 30, 2006, with an adult hits format, branded as "100.5 Bob FM" and call sign KIBB, under the ownership of Connoisseur Media. On February 14, 2008, at 10 a.m., after two months of simulcasting, the adult hits format and KIBB call sign would be moved to the newly acquired 97.1 frequency; subsequently, 100.5 would flip to a country format, branded as "100.5 The Wolf". The station would temporarily hold 97.1's former KGGG call sign until February 21, when the station switched call signs with a station in Iowa. The Wolf started with a "10,000 songs in a row" promotion, which is common among newer radio stations, in order to attract an audience.

On November 23, 2015, KVWF flipped to classic country, branded as "100.5 Hank FM". The move takes place almost a year after former classic country station KFTI-FM was sold to Envision and flipped to Rhythmic AC (the format was subsequently moved to 1070 AM).

Rocking M Media acquired KVWF and KIBB from Connoisseur Media effective September 30, 2017, at a purchase price of $3.3 million.

=== AAA 'Flight' ===
On December 2, 2017, at Midnight, KVWF began stunting with Christmas music. On December 28, at 2 p.m., KVWF flipped to an adult album alternative format (the first of its kind in the market), branded as "Flight 100.5". The first song under the new format was "I Won't Back Down" by Tom Petty.

=== Collapsed sale, silence, legal issues ===
On March 29, 2019, Rocking M announced they would sell KVWF and its five sister stations in the Wichita/Wellington/Winfield area to Allied Media Partners, a local group owned by Matt Baty and Tommy Castor, for $6.2 million. Allied Media Partners took over the stations via a local marketing agreement on April 1. The FCC approved the sale in late May; however, the sale was not consummated due to Allied Media Partners’ condition that Rocking M would clear all liens and outstanding debt on the stations in order for the sale to be completed. The completion date would be delayed a few more times, with a final scheduled completion date of October 31. On September 23, 2019, Envision, Inc., who owns the building that houses the station's studios, would lock the doors, denying staff members access to the station and offices; the non-profit organization claimed that Rocking M was behind in their lease agreement. In response, Rocking M took each station off the air that day as well. A week later, Allied Media Partners announced it would cease operations, and let go all employees, putting the future of the stations in jeopardy. On October 11, Envision filed a lawsuit against Rocking M in Harvey County District Court, claiming that Rocking M did not meet a payment schedule related to sister station KKGQ's sale in 2017 and owed the company money (Envision sought $1.25 million plus interest, costs and attorneys’ fees). It also wanted a sheriff's sale of property related to the station and demanded that Rocking M deliver all collateral to Envision. On November 6, Envision filed a second lawsuit against Rocking M in Sedgwick County District Court for failing to vacate the building that houses their stations' studios, along with leaving behind damaged property and failing to pay rent for parking spaces. In return, Rocking M filed a complaint with the FCC, hoping that the agency would force Envision to allow access back to the stations' studios, as well as to fine the company. In addition, Rocking M has stated that it hopes to still sell KVWF and its five sister stations. On August 28, 2020, the Harvey County District Court ruled in favor of Envision, awarding the company $1.2 million plus interest for what it said was Rocking M's breach of contract.

On February 5, 2020, KVWF returned to the air, operating from studios in Wellington, and briefly returned to the "Hank FM" format and branding. On March 1, KVWF fell silent again due to technical issues with their studio-to-transmitter link. A suspension of operations/silent temporary authority filing was not submitted until October 2020, with Rocking M citing the aforementioned technical issues, as well as a shortage of operating funds, along with inadvertence from the company's marketing and facilities manager, as the reasons behind the request. The STA request was approved on November 25, 2020. Rocking M had until February 28, 2021 to return KVWF to air; as of February 26, KVWF resumed broadcasting, this time simulcasting the classic country format of KMMM in Pratt. On December 23, 2021, Rocking M agreed to a Consent Decree with a $7,000 fine to settle the license renewal applications for KVWF, KIBB, KWME, KKLE and KLEY, and to complete the sale of KKGQ to Pinnacle Media. Rocking M admitted in its license renewal applications that all six stations were silent for periods of time without STA’s filed or granted by the FCC. As part of the Consent Decree, the stations will all be given conditional one year license renewals as opposed to the usual seven year term. On March 26, 2022, Rocking M filed for Chapter 11 bankruptcy protection, claiming $1,307,696.75 in assets and $22,365,886.40 in liabilities owed between its four holding companies. Bankruptcy attorney Sharon Stolte of Sandberg Phoenix & von Gontard, who is representing the company, told The Wichita Eagle, “We filed on Saturday, and we are hoping to reorganize. We will sell some of the stations that we find are not profitable, and we will reorganize the debt with the remaining stations.” In addition, the lawsuit between Rocking M and Allied Media Partners would go to trial in June 2022.

=== Sale to Murfin Media ===
On July 29, 2022, Rocking M announced they would partner with Patrick Communications to market and engage a sale of Rocking M's Wichita, Wellington and Winfield stations (including KVWF), as well as 7 other stations in Kansas, through an auction; bids were then accepted until September 27, with the auction set to take place in October. During the week of September 18, KVWF began simulcasting the adult hits format (from Local Radio Networks' "Mix" format) that originated on KWME and would broadcast on the aforementioned stations that were planned to be sold. On October 31, it was announced that Pittsburg-based MyTown Media was the winning bidder for KVWF and Rocking M's Wichita, Wellington and Winfield stations for $1.18 million; the company was also the winning bidder for two stations in Liberal and Pratt. While the bankruptcy court has approved the purchases, the sale was officially filed with the FCC on February 2, 2023.

The sale to MyTown Media, doing business as Murfin Media, was approved by the FCC on March 29, 2023, and was consummated on May 12.

=== Relaunch as ‘My Country’ ===
On June 29, 2023, KVWF flipped back to country, this time branded as "My Country 100.5." The station became MyTown's seventh such station in Kansas, all of which feature a mix of current, classic and Red dirt country. With the flip, KVWF becomes the sixth country station targeting Wichita, joining competitors KFDI, KZSN, KFTI, KWLS and KGHF. By April of the following year, the station dropped all red dirt artists, focusing exclusively on the country artists.

=== Relaunch as ‘The Twister’ ===
On May 1, 2024, KVWF began promoting "something new" to come the following day at noon. At 11 a.m. the following day, after playing “Texas Tornado” by Tracy Lawrence, KVWF began stunting with nature-themed songs. One hour later, KVWF relaunched with a gold-heavy country format, with a balance of more modern and more classic country artists, similar in nature to Cumulus Media's Nash Icon network, as “100.5 The Twister.” The first song on “The Twister” was “The Thunder Rolls” by Garth Brooks. With the flip, the station added a duo of notable Wichita country DJs, adding Dan Holiday, formerly of KZSN, as programming director and morning host, and Carol Hughes, formerly of KFDI, for middays. The station also added Becca Walls, a syndicated host most notably from the syndicated Broadway and Friends show, for afternoons.
