= KBOB-FM =

Radio station in Haven–Wichita, Kansas

- Haven, Kansas; United States
- Broadcast area: Wichita, Kansas
- Frequency: 97.1 MHz
- Branding: 97.1 BOB FM

Programming
- Format: Adult hits
- Affiliations: Bob FM network

Ownership
- Owner: Murfin Media; (My Town Media Inc)
- Sister stations: KKLE; KLEY; KVWF; KWME

History
- First air date: May 11, 1998 (as KLSI)
- Former call signs: KLSI (1998); KSKU (1998–2007); KGGG (2007–2008); KIBB (2008–2023)
- Call sign meaning: Bob FM

Technical information
- Licensing authority: FCC
- Facility ID: 59995
- Class: C2
- ERP: 18,500 watts
- HAAT: 251 meters (823 ft)
- Transmitter coordinates: 37°48′0.7″N 97°31′30.2″W

Links
- Public license information: Public file; LMS
- Webcast: Listen live
- Website: www.murfinmedia.com/97-1-bob-fm/

KBOB-FM (97.1 MHz) is a radio station licensed to Haven, Kansas, the station serves the Wichita area, and airs an adult hits format under the "Bob FM" branding. The station is currently owned by parent corporation, Murfin Media, through daughter corporation and licensee, My Town Media Inc. The station's studios are located in downtown Wichita, and the transmitter is near Colwich, Kansas.

== History ==
=== KLSI and KSKU ===
The 97.1 frequency, which initially targeted the Hutchinson area, signed on the air on May 11, 1998, with an adult contemporary format as "Classy 97.1" KLSI. The KLSI call sign formerly belonged to Kansas City radio station KMXV. The station was owned by Ad Astra Per Aspera Broadcasting. On November 27, 1998, the station flipped to an adult-oriented Top 40 format, branded simply as "97.1 KSKU", adopting the call sign that was formerly on 102.1 FM during their Top 40 run from 1973 to 1986.

Ad Astra would sell the station to Connoisseur Media in 2007. At the same time, Ad Astra would relocate the Top 40 format to 94.7 FM, replacing satellite-fed oldies. The newly relocated frequency received the call sign KGGG on February 1, 2007, which was formerly located on 94.7; 97.1 FM, meanwhile, went dark for over a year.

=== Bob FM ===
The adult hits format, branded as "Bob FM", would relocate to 97.1 from 100.5 on February 14, 2008, in order to make way for a new country station to be aired on that frequency (the station signed on the same day). 97.1 would acquire the KIBB call sign the day before, while the KGGG call sign would relocate to a sister station in Iowa.

Rocking M Media acquired KIBB and KVWF from Connoisseur effective September 30, 2017, at a purchase price of $3.3 million.

=== Collapsed sale, silence, legal issues ===
On March 29, 2019, Rocking M announced they would sell KIBB and its five sister stations in the Wichita/Wellington/Winfield area to Allied Media Partners, a local group owned by Matt Baty and Tommy Castor, for $6.2 million. Allied Media Partners took over the stations via a local marketing agreement on April 1. The FCC approved the sale in late May; however, the sale was not consummated due to Allied Media Partners’ condition that Rocking M would clear all liens and outstanding debt on the stations in order for the sale to be completed. The completion date would be delayed a few more times, with a final scheduled completion date of October 31. On September 23, 2019, Envision, Inc., who owns the building that houses the station's studios, would lock the doors, denying staff members access to the station and offices; the non-profit organization claimed that Rocking M was behind in their lease agreement. In response, Rocking M took each station off the air that day as well. A week later, Allied Media Partners announced it would cease operations, and let go all employees, putting the future of the stations in jeopardy. On October 11, Envision filed a lawsuit against Rocking M in Harvey County District Court, claiming that Rocking M did not meet a payment schedule related to sister station KKGQ's sale in 2017 and owed the company money (Envision sought $1.25 million plus interest, costs and attorneys’ fees). It also wanted a sheriff's sale of property related to the station and demanded that Rocking M deliver all collateral to Envision. On November 6, Envision filed a second lawsuit against Rocking M in Sedgwick County District Court for failing to vacate the building that houses their stations' studios, along with leaving behind damaged property and failing to pay rent for parking spaces. In return, Rocking M filed a complaint with the FCC, hoping that the agency would force Envision to allow access back to the stations' studios, as well as to fine the company. In addition, Rocking M stated that it hopes to still sell KIBB and its five sister stations.

Previous logo

On February 4, 2020, KIBB returned to the air, now operating from studios in Wellington, along with sister stations KKGQ and KWME, and began airing the syndicated "Bob FM" format from Sun Broadcast Group, though would fall silent again on March 1.

On August 28, 2020, the Harvey County District Court ruled in favor of Envision, awarding the company $1.2 million plus interest for what it said was Rocking M's breach of contract. On December 23, 2021, Rocking M agreed to a Consent Decree with a $7,000 fine to settle the license renewal applications for KIBB, KVWF, KWME, KKLE and KLEY, and to complete the sale of KKGQ to Pinnacle Media. Rocking M admitted in its license renewal applications that all six stations were silent for periods of time without STA’s filed or granted by the FCC. As part of the Consent Decree, the stations were all given conditional one year license renewals as opposed to the usual seven-year term. On March 26, 2022, Rocking M filed for Chapter 11 bankruptcy protection, claiming $1,307,696.75 in assets and $22,365,886.40 in liabilities owed between its four holding companies. Bankruptcy attorney Sharon Stolte of Sandberg Phoenix & von Gontard, who is representing the company, told The Wichita Eagle that, “We filed on Saturday, and we are hoping to reorganize. We will sell some of the stations that we find are not profitable, and we will reorganize the debt with the remaining stations.” In addition, the lawsuit between Rocking M and Allied Media Partners would go to trial in June 2022. On April 27, 2022, KIBB went silent; the "Bob FM" branding and format would later be adopted by Winfield station KSOK-FM.

=== Sale to Murfin Media, relaunch ===
On July 29, 2022, Rocking M announced they would partner with Patrick Communications to market and engage a sale of Rocking M's Wichita, Wellington and Winfield stations (including KIBB), as well as seven other stations in Kansas, through an auction; bids were then accepted until September 27. During the week of September 18, KIBB returned to the air, simulcasting the un-branded adult hits format (from Local Radio Networks' "Mix" format) originating on KWME and broadcasting on the aforementioned stations that were planned to be sold. On October 31, it was announced that Pittsburg-based My Town Media was the winning bidder for KIBB and Rocking M's Wichita, Wellington and Winfield stations for $1.18 million; the company was also the winning bidder for two stations in Liberal and Pratt. While the bankruptcy court had approved the purchases, the sale was officially filed with the FCC on February 2, 2023.

The sale to My Town Media, doing business as Murfin Media, was approved by the FCC on March 29, 2023, and was consummated on May 12. In conjunction with the sale, My Town filed to change KIBB's call sign to KBOB-FM, which took effect on May 23. On May 31, the station returned to the syndicated 'Bob FM' branding and format, which is now part of G Networks.
