= KLEY (AM) =

- Wellington, Kansas; United States
- Broadcast area: Wichita, Kansas
- Frequency: 1130 kHz
- Branding: Thunder Country 104.1 FM/1130 AM

Programming
- Format: Country

Ownership
- Owner: Murfin Media; (My Town Media Inc)
- Sister stations: KBOB-FM; KKLE; KMMM; KSMM; KVWF; KWME

History
- First air date: November 19, 1966

Technical information
- Licensing authority: FCC
- Facility ID: 31895
- Class: D
- Power: 250 watts day; 1 watt night
- Transmitter coordinates: 37°14′28.1″N 97°24′5.2″W
- Translator: 104.1 K281DI (Wellington)

Links
- Public license information: Public file; LMS
- Webcast: Listen live

KLEY (1130 kHz) is an AM radio station broadcasting a country music format to the Wellington, Kansas, United States, area. The station is owned by My Town Media. 1130 AM is a clear-channel frequency shared by Canada and the United States.

== History ==
Ed & Zora Hundley's Sumner Broadcasting Company applied for a construction permit for KLEY on June 28, 1965. On November 4, 1966, the station applied for a license to cover its construction permit, and KLEY received its first license on February 6, 1967. The station has carried the callsign KLEY since its inception. KLEY was a family-owned station for years, run by Ed and Zora Belle Hundley. In the 1980s, it featured a variety of programming during a sunrise-to-sunset schedule, including a daily half-hour of polka music at 1:30 p.m.

=== FM sister station ===
KLEY gained a sister FM station in 1980 with the addition of 93.5 KZED. KZED is now known as KWME, and in December 2011, changed frequencies to 92.7 MHz.

=== Collapsed sale, silence, legal issues ===
On March 29, 2019, Rocking M announced they would sell KLEY and its five sister stations in the Wichita/Wellington/Winfield area to Allied Media Partners, a local group owned by Matt Baty and Tommy Castor, for $6.2 million. Allied Media Partners would take over the stations via a local marketing agreement on April 1. The FCC approved the sale in late May; however, the sale was not consummated due to Allied Media Partners' condition that Rocking M would clear all liens and outstanding debt on the stations in order for the sale to be completed. The completion date would be delayed a few more times, with a final scheduled completion date of October 31. On September 23, 2019, Envision, who owns the building that houses the station's studios, would lock the doors, denying staff members access to the station and offices; the non-profit organization claimed that Rocking M was behind in their lease agreement. In response, Rocking M would take each station off the air that day as well. A week later, Allied Media Partners announced it would cease operations, and let go all employees, putting the future of the stations in jeopardy. On October 11, Envision filed a lawsuit against Rocking M in Harvey County District Court, claiming that Rocking M did not meet a payment schedule related to sister station KKGQ's sale in 2017 and owed the company money (Envision sought $1.25 million plus interest, costs and attorneys’ fees). It also wanted a sheriff's sale of property related to the station and demanded that Rocking M deliver all collateral to Envision. On November 6, Envision filed a second lawsuit against Rocking M in Sedgwick County District Court for failing to vacate the building that houses their stations' studios, along with leaving behind damaged property and failing to pay rent for parking spaces. In return, Rocking M filed a complaint with the FCC, hoping that the agency would force Envision to allow access back to the stations' studios, as well as to fine the company. In addition, Rocking M has stated that it hopes to still sell KLEY and its five sister stations. On August 28, 2020, the Harvey County District Court ruled in favor of Envision, awarding the company $1.2 million plus interest for what it said was Rocking M's breach of contract.

On August 11, 2020, KLEY would return to the air, operating from studios in Wellington, but would fall silent again on August 25. A suspension of operations/silent temporary authority filing was not submitted until October, with Rocking M citing a shortage of operating funds resulting from the COVID-19 pandemic, along with inadvertence from the company's marketing and facilities manager, as the reasons behind the request. The STA request would be approved on November 25, 2020. Rocking M has until August 24, 2021, to return KLEY to air. On December 23, 2021, Rocking M agreed to a Consent Decree with a $7,000 fine to settle the license renewal applications for KLEY, KIBB, KWME, KKLE and KVWF, and to complete the sale of KKGQ to Pinnacle Media. Rocking M admitted in its license renewal applications that all six stations were silent for periods of time without STA's filed or granted by the FCC. As part of the Consent Decree, the stations will all be given conditional one year license renewals as opposed to the usual seven-year term. On March 26, 2022, Rocking M filed for Chapter 11 bankruptcy protection, claiming $1,307,696.75 in assets and $22,365,886.40 in liabilities owed between its four holding companies. Bankruptcy attorney Sharon Stolte of Sandberg Phoenix & von Gontard, who is representing the company, told The Wichita Eagle, “We filed on Saturday, and we are hoping to reorganize. We will sell some of the stations that we find are not profitable, and we will reorganize the debt with the remaining stations.” In addition, the lawsuit between Rocking M and Allied Media Partners will go to trial in June 2022.

=== Sale to Murfin Media ===
On July 29, Rocking M announced they would partner with Patrick Communications to market and engage a sale of Rocking M's Wichita, Wellington and Winfield stations (including KLEY and FM translator K262CQ), as well as 7 other stations in Kansas, through an auction; bids were then accepted until September 27, with the auction set to take place in October. KLEY/K262CQ would begin airing an adult hits format (from Local Radio Networks' "Mix" format) that also broadcast on the aforementioned stations that were planned to be sold in August. On October 31, it was announced that Pittsburg-based MyTown Media was the winning bidder for KLEY/K262CQ and Rocking M's Wichita and Winfield stations for $1.18 million; the company was also the winning bidder for two stations in Liberal and Pratt. While the bankruptcy court has approved the purchases, the sale was officially filed with the FCC on February 2, 2023.

The sale to MyTown Media, doing business as Murfin Media, was approved by the FCC on March 29, 2023, and was consummated on May 12.

=== 2024 relaunch ===
On August 28, 2023, K262CQ, KLEY's FM translator, was relocated to 104.1 FM (and subsequently changed call letters to K281DI). While Murfin initially planned for KLEY/K281DI to air an all-red dirt music format, along with agriculture news reports, the stations remained with the adult hits format until February 1, 2024, when they relaunched with an oldies format (which transitioned to classic hits two months later). In addition, KLEY/K281DI will be the home for Wellington High School athletics.

On July 1, 2025, KLEY flipped to a country music format, branded as "Thunder Country". The station continues to carry Wellington High School sports events programming.

== Translator ==
Broadcast translator for KLEY
| Call sign | Frequency | City of license | FID | ERP (W) | HAAT | Class | Transmitter coordinates | FCC info |
|---|---|---|---|---|---|---|---|---|
| K281DI | 104.1 FM | Wellington, Kansas | 142748 | 250 | 0 m (0 ft) | D | 37°14′28″N 97°24′4″W | LMS |
