= WJDF =

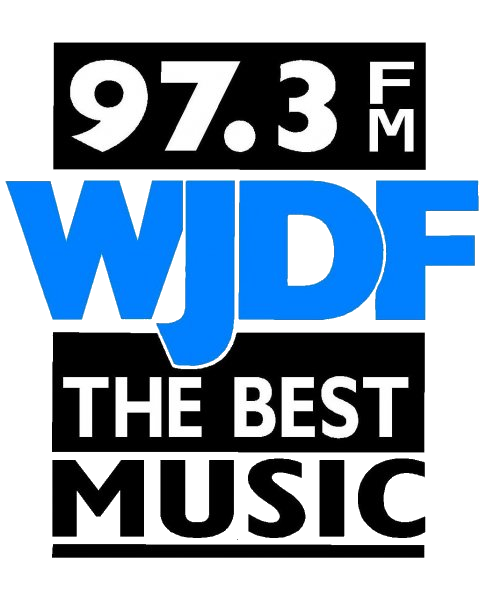
- Orange, Massachusetts; United States
- Broadcast area: North Quabbin
- Frequency: 97.3 MHz
- Branding: 97.3 FM WJDF

Programming
- Format: Full service classic hits

Ownership
- Owner: Deane Brothers Broadcasting Corp.

History
- First air date: August 1995
- Last air date: April 4, 2019
- Former call signs: WFUB (1991–1995)
- Call sign meaning: Jay, Donn, and Fred Deane (owners)

Technical information
- Licensing authority: FCC
- Facility ID: 16006
- Class: A
- ERP: 5,800 watts
- HAAT: 25 meters (82 ft)
- Transmitter coordinates: 42°36′2.68″N 72°22′59.31″W

Links
- Public license information: Public file; LMS

WJDF (97.3 FM) was a radio station licensed to serve Orange, Massachusetts. The station was owned by Deane Brothers Broadcasting Corp. It aired a full service classic hits music format.

The station was assigned the WJDF call letters by the Federal Communications Commission (FCC) on June 30, 1995. It signed on in August 1995 with an adult contemporary format. In January 2014, WJDF reformatted to full-service classic hits.

On November 30, 2018, the FCC warned WJDF of a potential for the revocation of their license if their debt was not paid within 60 days; at the time, the station owed $9,642 in regulatory fees dating to 2014. The station did not respond to the warning, and on April 4, 2019, WJDF's license was revoked by the FCC. At the time of the revocation, WJDF had been operated by Steve Wendell under a local marketing agreement, with plans for Wendell to acquire the station outright. Wendell subsequently announced his intention to file a $1.8 million lawsuit against Deane Brothers Broadcasting, as he had not been informed of the station's unpaid regulatory fees (which prevented renewal of the WJDF license and the proposed license transfer); in addition, the station had been silent from August to December 2018 after WJDF's transmitter was destroyed by two lightning strikes.

Wendell won the construction permit for a new station on 97.3 in Orange at auction in August 2021, but sold it to Horizon Christian Fellowship (operators of the RenewFM network) for $138,000 in 2023; it signed on in 2024 as WKXE.
