= KKGQ =

- Newton, Kansas; United States
- Broadcast area: Wichita metropolitan area
- Frequency: 92.3 MHz
- Branding: ESPN Wichita 92.3

Programming
- Format: Sports
- Affiliations: Kansas Jayhawks; Wichita Wind Surge; Wichita Open; ESPN Radio; Westwood One Sports

Ownership
- Owner: Chad Boeger; (Pinnacle Media, LLC)
- Operator: Union Broadcasting

History
- First air date: 1959
- Former call signs: KJRG-FM (1959–1976); KOEZ (1976–2000); KMXW (2000–2007); KFTI–FM (2007–2014)
- Former frequencies: 92.1 MHz (1959–1963)

Technical information
- Licensing authority: FCC
- Facility ID: 35020
- Class: C1
- ERP: 100,000 watts
- HAAT: 195 meters (640 ft)
- Transmitter coordinates: 38.020°N 97.385°W

Links
- Public license information: Public file; LMS
- Webcast: Listen live
- Website: www.espnwichita.com

KKGQ (92.3 FM) is a commercial radio station licensed to Newton, Kansas, United States, and serving the Wichita metropolitan area. Owned by Union Broadcasting, it airs a sports radio format as the market affiliate for ESPN Radio, branded as "ESPN Wichita 92.3". The studios are on McLean Boulevard, next to Equity Bank Park in Wichita. KKGQ is a member of the Jayhawk Radio Network and regularly broadcasts the Kansas Jayhawks football and men's basketball games. KKGQ's transmitter is sited along Cow Palace Road on the south side of Newton.

== History ==
=== Easy listening years ===
What is now KKGQ started as KJRG-FM in 1959. It was a sister station to Newton, Kansas-licensed KJRG and had its studios there; both stations were owned by George Basil Anderson. After spending its first four years at 92.1 FM, KJRG-FM relocated to 92.3 FM in 1963. For four decades, the station aired a beautiful music/easy listening format. In 1976, KJRG-FM changed its call sign to KOEZ. The station was consistently in the top 10 of the Wichita market's radio ratings from the early 1980s through the 1990s.

=== KMXW/KFTI-FM ===
After being purchased by Journal Broadcast Group in December 1999 and focused its audience to Wichita (as well as moving studios there), on January 15, 2000, they flipped to an adult contemporary format as "Mix 92.3" and would later evolve to adult top 40. The station would change its call sign to KMXW on October 27, 2000. The ratings quickly dropped. The station was the Wichita affiliate of the Dallas-based morning show Kidd Kraddick in the Morning (which moved to KFBZ in December 2005). In the fall of 2002, the station flipped to "92.3 the Zone" with an automated modern AC/modern rock format. One year later, the station would revert to hot AC as "The New 92.3". On September 10, 2004, KMXW flipped to a gold-based rhythmic adult contemporary format as "Magic 92.3". None of these attempts garnered any ratings success. On January 16, 2007, KMXW flipped to classic country as "Classic Country 92.3". The call sign was changed to KFTI-FM. Almost instantly, the station jumped back into the top 10 in the ratings.

=== Sale to Envision, 'Q92' ===
On July 30, 2014, it was announced that the E. W. Scripps Company would acquire Journal Communications in an all-stock transaction. The combined firm would retain their broadcast properties and spin off their print assets as Journal Media Group. KFTI-FM, their sister radio stations in the Wichita area, and two TV stations were not included in the merger; in September, Journal filed to transfer these stations to the Journal/Scripps Divestiture Trust (with Kiel Media Group as trustee). With the merger, the grandfathered ownership clause that Journal had was voided, forcing a sale of one of the Journal stations to satisfy ownership limits.

On October 10, 2014, Journal announced that KFTI-FM would be sold to Wichita-based Envision, a non-profit blind advocacy group, under their newly formed broadcasting division, for a price of $1.55 million. Journal also announced that the format and KFTI call sign would be moved back to 1070 AM after a 4 1/2-year absence; at midnight on October 22, KLIO dropped ESPN Deportes Radio for a simulcast of KFTI-FM. The simulcast continued until the approval of the sale on December 12, 2014. Envision applied to change KFTI-FM's call sign to KKGQ upon the closing of the sale. Although Envision is a non-profit organization, the station would continue to operate with a commercial license. In addition, Envision registered several website domains with "Q" in the address, including Q92TheBeat.com, Q92TheBeat.net and Q92TheBeat.org, as well as anonymous domains for Q92Wichita.com, Q923Wichita.com, 923QFM.com and 923TheQ.com that were registered when the sale was announced (Q92Wichita.com would be picked as the official domain).

At midnight on December 13, 2014, the station, now under the KKGQ call sign, broke from the simulcast, and began stunting with music from blind musicians, as well as construction sound effects and greeting messages from Envision employees. At 6 a.m. on November 15, the station shifted its stunting to Christmas music, now using the moniker "Santa Q92". At 6 a.m. on December 26, the stunting shifted towards playing a wide variety of music from multiple genres (while leaving hints of a possible contemporary music direction based on the stunting), now utilizing the station's intended moniker "Q92". At a press conference on December 30, Envision announced that Brett Harris and Tracy Cassidy (formerly of KRBB) would host mornings on the station beginning January 5.

At midnight on January 1, 2015, KKGQ began airing a six-hour program of smooth jazz music titled The Oasis, which aired in overnights for a brief period. (The "Oasis" name was based on a former Wichita station of the same name). At 6 a.m., the station officially flipped back to rhythmic AC, branded as "Q92 The Beat", and used the slogan "The Best Mix 90s to Now". The second go-around with the format had a playlist focused on pop and rhythmic hits from the 1990s to the current day (as well as some current pop-rock songs for balance) instead of the 1970s and 1980s focus its "Magic" predecessor had. Over the course of 2015, the station added more hot AC material to the playlist, with the complete shift to the format completed on October 1 (most of the rhythmic AC material had been moved to the evening hours), though the station did retain a rhythmic lean overall.

By February 2017, KKGQ changed its slogan to "Today's Best Mix & Throwbacks", dropped much of the rhythmic component of their playlist, and dropped the "Beat" portion of their slogan, rebranding as just "Q92".

=== Sale to Rocking M, 'Kansas Country' ===
On April 5, 2017, Envision announced that they would merge their broadcasting division with Manhattan, Kansas-based Rocking M Media, who were also in the process of acquiring KIBB and KVWF from Connoisseur Media. As part of the deal, Rocking M would relocate KIBB/KVWF's studios into KKGQ's space on North Main Street in downtown Wichita, as well as integrate Envision's education programs for the visually impaired into its operations in all of their Central and Western Kansas stations. Rocking M took over KKGQ via a local marketing agreement on April 10, with the sale officially completed on September 22 at a price of $2.5 million. In addition, Harris and Cassidy would be let go from the station on April 19, and the station rebranded as "Q92.3".

During its tenure as "Q", ratings were in the upper 0s—mid-1 shares of the Wichita market, and often ranked as the lowest rated commercial station in the market. In the spring-2017 ratings period, KKGQ held a 0.7 share of the market, whereas closest competitor KFBZ held a 3.6 share, and mainstream AC rival KRBB held a 4.7 share. Because of this, on September 5, 2017, at midnight, after playing "Centuries" by Fall Out Boy, KKGQ flipped to country, branded as "Kansas Country 92.3". The first song on "Kansas Country" was "Austin" by Pat Green.

=== Collapsed sale, silence, legal issues, 'The Brand' ===
On March 29, 2019, Rocking M announced they would sell KKGQ and its five sister stations in the Wichita/Wellington/Winfield area to Allied Media Partners, a local group owned by Matt Baty and Tommy Castor, for $6.2 million. Allied Media Partners would take over the stations via a local marketing agreement on April 1. The Federal Communications Commission (FCC) approved the sale in late May; however, the sale was not consummated due to Allied Media Partners’ condition that Rocking M would clear all liens and outstanding debt on the stations in order for the sale to be completed. The completion date would be delayed a few more times, with a final scheduled completion date of October 31. On September 23, 2019, Envision, which owns the building that houses the station's studios, would lock the doors, denying staff members access to the station and offices; the non-profit organization claimed that Rocking M was behind in their lease agreement. In response, Rocking M took each station off the air that same day. A week later, Allied Media Partners announced it would cease operations, and let go all employees, putting the future of the stations in jeopardy. KKGQ would occasionally return to the air to broadcast Kansas State Wildcats football games as part of the station's agreement with Learfield Sports to carry the games as the Wichita affiliate.

On October 11, 2019, Envision filed a lawsuit against Rocking M in Harvey County District Court, claiming that Rocking M did not meet a payment schedule related to KKGQ's sale in 2017 and owes the company money (Envision was seeking $1.25 million plus interest, costs and attorneys' fees). It also wanted a sheriff's sale of property related to the station and demanded that Rocking M deliver all collateral to Envision. On November 6, Envision filed a second lawsuit against Rocking M in Sedgwick County District Court for failing to vacate the building that houses their stations' studios, along with leaving behind damaged property and failing to pay rent for parking spaces. In return, Rocking M filed a complaint with the FCC, hoping that the agency would force Envision to allow access back to the stations' studios, as well as to fine the company. In addition, Rocking M had stated that it hoped to still sell KKGQ and its five sister stations.

On January 16, 2020, KKGQ returned to the air, this time operating from studios in Wellington, and would retain the country format, airing the syndicated "Brand" format from Envision Radio Networks (not related to the non-profit Envision; has since been renamed Sun Broadcast Group, and is now under the ownership of SuiteRadio), subsequently rebranding as "92.3 The Brand".

On August 28, 2020, the Harvey County District Court ruled in favor of Envision, awarding the company $1.2 million plus interest for what it said was Rocking M's breach of contract.

=== ESPN Wichita ===
On April 6, 2021, Rocking M announced it would sell KKGQ to Overland Park-based Pinnacle Media (owned by Chad Boeger, who is the president of Union Broadcasting, owner of Kansas City sports talk stations WHB and KCTE, as well as three sports stations (WHBE, WHBE-FM, and WLCL) in the Louisville, Kentucky, market) for $623,000. As part of the deal, Union and Envision would conduct a one day camp for blind and visually impaired youths that includes access and engagement to produce and air radio broadcast shows. Also, Envision would be a "founding partner" of the station until 2024, would air a bi-weekly hour-long show on the station "espousing the Envision mission and all that Envision does", and Pinnacle/Union would review and consider resumes of blind and visually impaired applicants from Envision when applicable. In addition, Union entered into an advertising agreement with Pinnacle to manage the station. Per the deal, the civil lawsuits between Envision and Rocking M were jointly dismissed. The sale was approved by the FCC on January 4, 2022, and was consummated on February 7.

On June 3, 2021, Pinnacle announced that KKGQ would flip to sports talk as "ESPN Wichita 92.3" on June 14 (the flip occurred a day earlier than planned on June 13). KKGQ's current schedule consists of The Shane Dennis Show from 12:00 p.m. to 2:00 p.m. and The Pulse with Pat Strathman from 2:00 p.m. to 4:00 pm, as well as partial simulcasts of WHB programs New Day with SSJ and The Program with Soren Petro. ESPN Radio programming fills the remainder of the schedule.
