= Maa Afia Konadu =

Ghanaian media personality (1950–2019)

- Born: Henrietta Okyere Twum; November 17, 1950; Ghana
- Died: May 1, 2019 (aged 68); United States
- Occupation: Radio presenter
- Known for: Wo Haw Ne Sɛn? and Asomdwoe Nkomo

Henrietta Okyere Twum (17 November 1950 – 1 May 2019), popularly known as Maa Afia Konadu, was a Ghanaian media personality known for hosting a mid-morning show, "Asomdwe Nkomo" on Peace FM. She left Peace FM after working for 10 years. She was nominated for the Radio Female Presenter of the Year at the 2013 Radio and Television Personality Awards.

== Career ==
- Beginning her career as a teacher, she worked with Ghana Broadcasting Corporation (GBC) and was later poached by Dr. Osei Kwame to help him establish Peace FM. She was nominated for Ghana's Outstanding Woman Radio Presenter 2018 GOWA awards. She hosted the programmes:'Wo haw ne sɛn', 'Mpom Te Sɛn' and 'Asomdwee NkomƆ' and was loved for her flair in the use of the Akan Language to make a positive impression on listeners.

== Death ==
- She suffered from illness in the US and died on May 1, 2019.
