= KGKP =

Radio station in Wellington–Wichita, Kansas

- Wellington, Kansas; United States
- Broadcast area: Wichita, Kansas
- Frequency: 92.7 MHz
- Branding: 92.7 The Keeper of the Hits

Programming
- Format: Classic hits

Ownership
- Owner: Steckline Communications, Inc.
- Sister stations: KGHF; KGSO; KQAM

History
- First air date: 1979 (as KZED at 93.5)
- Former call signs: KZED (1979–1990); KWME (1990–2026)
- Former frequencies: 93.5 MHz (1979–2011)
- Call sign meaning: Keeper of the Plains

Technical information
- Licensing authority: FCC
- Facility ID: 31894
- Class: C3
- ERP: 14,000 watts
- HAAT: 130 meters

Links
- Public license information: Public file; LMS
- Webcast: Listen live
- Website: www.stecklinecommunications.com/927hits

KGKP (92.7 FM) is a radio station licensed to Wellington, Kansas, United States, and serving the Wichita area. The station is currently owned by Steckline Communications and broadcasts a classic hits format known as "92.7 The Keeper of the Hits".

== History ==
=== Early years ===
This station officially signed on the air in 1979 as KZED, broadcasting on 93.5 FM. KZED changed its call sign to KWME in 1990. The station moved to 92.7 FM in December 2011, following KANR's move to 99.7 FM. This was part of a multi-station move, where KCVW (94.3 FM), owned by Bott Radio Network, would upgrade its signal to improve its coverage in Wichita; this resulted in Andover station KDGS (93.9 FM) and Eureka station KOTE (93.5 FM) swapping frequencies in October 2014.

Rocking M Media bought KWME and sister station KLEY from Gordon Johnson in 2015.

=== 'The Blast' ===
On July 2, 2018, KWME dropped its then-classic hits format (branded as "SuperHits 92.7") and began stunting with all-Patriotic music as "92.7 The Patriot." On July 4, at Noon, KWME flipped to Rhythmic AC as "92.7 The Blast", launching with "Jump Around" by House of Pain. The flip marked the return of an adult-oriented rhythmic format to the market for the first time since now-former sister station KKGQ shifted from Rhythmic to Hot AC in October 2015. The playlist included a wide range of hip hop, R&B and dance hits from the late 1970s to the early 2010s, with no currents.

=== Collapsed sale, silence, legal issues ===
On March 29, 2019, Rocking M announced they would sell KWME and its five sister stations in the Wichita/Wellington/Winfield area to Allied Media Partners, a local group owned by Matt Baty and Tommy Castor, for $6.2 million. Allied Media Partners would take over the stations via a local marketing agreement on April 1. The FCC approved the sale in late May; however, the sale was not consummated due to Allied Media Partners' condition that Rocking M would clear all liens and outstanding debt on the stations in order for the sale to be completed. The completion date would be delayed a few more times, with a final scheduled completion date of October 31. On September 23, 2019, Envision, who owns the building that housed the station's studios, would lock the doors, denying staff members access to the station and offices; the non-profit organization claims that Rocking M was behind in their lease agreement. In response, Rocking M would take each station off the air that day as well. A week later, Allied Media Partners announced it would cease operations, and let go all employees, putting the future of the stations in jeopardy. On October 11, Envision filed a lawsuit against Rocking M in Harvey County District Court, claiming that Rocking M did not meet a payment schedule related to KKGQ's sale in 2017 and owed the company money (Envision is seeking $1.25 million plus interest, costs and attorneys’ fees). It also wanted a sheriff's sale of property related to the station and demanded that Rocking M deliver all collateral to Envision. On November 6, Envision filed a second lawsuit against Rocking M in Sedgwick County District Court for failing to vacate the building that houses their station's studios, along with leaving behind damaged property and failing to pay rent for parking spaces. In return, Rocking M filed a complaint with the FCC, hoping that the agency would force Envision to allow access back to the stations' studios, as well as to fine the company. In addition, Rocking M has stated that it hopes to still sell KWME and its five sister stations. On August 28, 2020, the Harvey County District Court ruled in favor of Envision, awarding the company $1.2 million plus interest for what it said was Rocking M's breach of contract.

On February 11, 2020, KWME returned to the air, operating from studios in Wellington, and picked up the syndicated "Jammin' Radio" rhythmic oldies format from Envision Radio Networks (not related to the non-profit Envision), rebranding as "Jammin' 92.7." A month later, on March 15, KWME fell silent again due to technical issues with their studio-to-transmitter link. A suspension of operations/silent temporary authority filing was not submitted until October 2020, with Rocking M citing the aforementioned technical issues, as well as a shortage of operating funds, along with inadvertence from the company's marketing and facilities manager, as the reasons behind the request. The STA request was approved on November 25, 2020. Rocking M had until March 14, 2021 to return KWME to air; as of February 23, 2021, KWME resumed broadcasting, this time airing an unbranded adult hits format (from Local Radio Networks' "Mix" format).

On December 23, 2021, Rocking M agreed to a Consent Decree with a $7,000 fine to settle the license renewal applications for KWME, KIBB, KVWF, KKLE and KLEY, and to complete the sale of KKGQ to Pinnacle Media. Rocking M admitted in its license renewal applications that all six stations were silent for periods of time without STA’s filed or granted by the FCC. As part of the Consent Decree, the stations will all be given conditional one year license renewals as opposed to the usual seven year term. On March 26, 2022, Rocking M filed for Chapter 11 bankruptcy protection, claiming $1,307,696.75 in assets and $22,365,886.40 in liabilities owed between its four holding companies. Bankruptcy attorney Sharon Stolte of Sandberg Phoenix & von Gontard, who is representing the company, told The Wichita Eagle that, “We filed on Saturday, and we are hoping to reorganize. We will sell some of the stations that we find are not profitable, and we will reorganize the debt with the remaining stations.” In addition, the lawsuit between Rocking M and Allied Media Partners will go to trial in June 2022.

=== Sale to Murfin Media ===
On July 29, 2022, Rocking M announced they would partner with Patrick Communications to market and engage a sale of Rocking M's Wichita, Wellington and Winfield stations (including KWME), as well as 7 other stations in Kansas, through an auction; bids were then accepted until September 27, with the auction set to take place in October. On October 31, it was announced that Pittsburg-based MyTown Media, doing business as Murfin Media, was the winning bidder for KWME and Rocking M's Wichita, Wellington and Winfield stations for $1.18 million; the company was also the winning bidder for two stations in Liberal and Pratt. While the bankruptcy court has approved the purchases, the sale was officially filed with the FCC on February 2, 2023.

The sale to MyTown Media was approved by the FCC on March 29, 2023, and was consummated on May 12.

=== 2023 relaunch ===
On June 29, 2023, at 2:45 p.m., after playing "Sunroof" by Nicky Youre, and a few minutes of silence, KWME flipped back to classic hits, branded simply as "Classic Hits 92.7", with "Love Bites" by Def Leppard being the first song played. On October 3, KWME rebranded as "92.7 The River". It soon reverted back to the "Classic Hits 92.7" branding. The station is, once again, competing against Audacy's KEYN.

=== 2026 relaunch ===
On October 9, 2026, KWME relaunched its classic hits format as "92.7 The Keeper of the Hits", with new KGKP call letters adopted on October 15.
