= KMMM =

Radio tation in Pratt, Kansas

Coordinates: 37°38′34″N 98°40′39″W

- Pratt, Kansas; United States
- Frequency: 1290 kHz
- Branding: True Country

Programming
- Format: Classic country
- Affiliations: SRN News; Kansas City Royals

Ownership
- Owner: MyTown Media; (My Town Media Inc)

History
- First air date: 1963 (as KWLS)
- Former call signs: KWLS (1963–2007)

Technical information
- Licensing authority: FCC
- Facility ID: 37126
- Class: B
- Power: 5,000 watts day 500 watts night

Links
- Public license information: Public file; LMS

KMMM (1290 AM) is a radio station licensed to Pratt, Kansas, United States. The station airs a classic country format, and is currently owned by My Town Media Inc.

As part of owner Rocking M Media's bankruptcy reorganization, in which 12 stations in Kansas would be auctioned off to new owners, it was announced on October 31, 2022, that Pittsburg-based MyTown Media was the winning bidder for KMMM for $41,000. While the bankruptcy court has approved the purchase, the sale was officially filed with the FCC on February 2, 2023.

The sale to MyTown Media was approved by the FCC on March 29, 2023, and was consummated on May 12.

Former logo
