= 2020 in radio =

The following is a list of events affecting radio broadcasting in 2020. Events listed include radio program debuts, finales, cancellations, and station launches, closures and format changes, as well as information about controversies.

== Notable events ==
=== January ===
Date	Event	Source
1	All-news WTOP-FM—Washington, D.C. rejoins CBS News Radio after two years with ABC, restoring a link between CBS and the station that dates back to 1932, when the network affiliated with, then purchased, predecessor WJSV.	
1	WKVA/W262DO—Lewistown, Pennsylvania, flips from classic rock-leaning "Big 100.3" to gold-based soft AC format at the stroke of midnight. The station is now known as "Gold Hits WKVA 920 AM & 100.3 FM".	
1	WWIZ—West Middlesex, Pennsylvania/Youngstown, Ohio, having dropped oldies on October 25, 2019, amid speculation of a format change, returns to the format after playing Christmas music.	
1	KSKI-FM—Sun Valley, Idaho, which dropped adult album alternative on November 1, 2019, returns with alternative.	
1	W233CM/WYCT-HD2—Pensacola, which began filling the Holiday void with Christmas music in November 2019, went straight to stunting with "Baby Shark" ahead of a potential flip. Its previous ESPN Radio format had already relocated to WEBY/W256DL in August 2019. On January 13, the station returns with soft AC billed as "Pensacola’s Blend," barring any legal issues from SiriusXM over the "Blend" name.	
1	WLGX—Louisville, which dropped their prior adult Top 40 format on November 27, 2019, in favor of Christmas music, begins two weeks of stunting leading up to a relaunch as 90s-centered adult hits WSDF on January 14.	
1	In a time brokerage agreement with RM Broadcasting, KCXL—Liberty, Missouri/Kansas City began airing Radio Sputnik six hours a day, which will run until December 31, 2022. The arrangement is already being criticized by local media for allowing a Russian-associated entity to broadcast programs that is considered propaganda to a Midwestern market.	
2	Urban One's Reach Media moved Rickey Smiley's syndicated morning show from mainstream urban outlets to urban AC and Adult R&B stations, where it replaced Tom Joyner's program due to the latter's retirement. Smiley's replacement at mainstream urban will be a new program hosted by Smiley's co-host Headkrack, starting January 6.	
2	As a result of Rickey Smiley's move to urban AC stations, mainstream urban WEDR—Miami will replace his program with a local show hosted by Love & Hip Hop: Miami stars Trick Daddy and Trina, which will also play into the VH1 reality-based series' storylines. Smiley will continue to be heard in the market as it moves over to Adult R&B sister WHQT.	
3	WNWV—Elyria/Cleveland, Ohio, which dropped smooth jazz on November 15, 2019, after nine years (WNWV also carried the format from 1987 to 2009) and dismissed its air staff on December 6, relaunches as modern AC "JenY 107.3" (a reference to Generation Y) following a period of Christmas music, a temporary simulcast of WQMX—Medina/Akron and a viral marketing campaign of billboards around Greater Cleveland that asked, "#WHOISJENY".	
3	Rhythmic AC WRKA—Louisville shifts to urban AC, adding Rickey Smiley to its lineup.	
3	Sports KABZ—Little Rock fires afternoon host Eric Sullivan after he is accused of stealing $409 from a woman at a local bar. The woman told police that she was at the restaurant on January 1 when she left her purse on the table and went to the restroom, then noticed the next day that her money was gone; she later viewed surveillance footage from the establishment and saw Sullivan going through her purse, which she then posted on her Facebook page. Sullivan did return the money to the woman and later issued an apology: "I need to address something to you all: I've made a monumental career mistake & I take full responsibility for it, I let many people down as well as the listeners and great people at 103.7 the Buzz and I will own that for the rest of my life."	
5	Premiere Networks renews The Rush Limbaugh Show through 2024.	
6	A new format (adult album alternative) replaced the "Nash Icon" country format at WNUQ—Sylvester/Albany, Georgia, following an October 2019 purchase of the station by Tripp Morgan's Pretoria Fields Collective Media from Cumulus Media’s Mainstay Station Trust. The station is being billed as "Q102 The Queen Bee" and will take the new callsign WPFQ.	
6	With Rickey Smiley moving over to urban AC KQXL-FM, rhythmic Top 40 sister WEMX—Baton Rouge will fill his morning slot with the syndicated DeDe In The Morning program, one of eight new affiliates joining the Dallas-based morning show.	
6	Talk KKOB—Albuquerque begins simulcasting over former "Nash Icon" country KBZU, renamed KKOB-FM (a previous KKOB-FM was renamed KOBQ in November 2019). KKOB was previously relayed over translator K233CG (94.5 FM).	
7	KNTY—Sacramento flips from a simulcast of regional Mexican KRCX-FM—Marysville to ranchera "José 101.9".	
13	Classic rock KOOO—Omaha transitions to adult hits, retaining the "101.9 The Keg" moniker.	
13	The Bavarian Radio Symphony Orchestra announces the award of its Karl Amadeus Hartmann Medal posthumously to its late conductor Mariss Jansons.	
13	After six days of stunting with Drake’s "Hotline Bling", rhythmic Top 40 WHTP—Portland, Maine begins simulcasting over former oldies WJYE/W262DP—Gardiner/Lewiston/Auburn and former classic country WCYR/W275CQ—Bangor; all three stations re-brand as "Hot Radio Maine".	
14	Vista Radio returns the "Bridge" branding to CHNV-FM—Nelson, British Columbia.	
14	iHeartMedia announces a major corporate restructuring, resulting in a round of mass layoffs nationwide, mainly in small and mid-sized markets, affecting hundreds of positions.	
16	Australian community radio station Stereo 974, based in Melbourne, ceases broadcasting because of lack of finance.	
16	Rhythmic contemporary KBDS—Bakersfield changes to Spanish/English CHR "Forge 103.9".	
16	Alternative KDXA—Ankeny/Des Moines, Iowa flips to a simulcast of sports KXNO—Des Moines as KXNO-FM. With the flip, the majority of KXNO's employees dismissed as part of iHeartMedia's mass layoffs two days earlier, resulting in listener and advertiser backlash and the remaining two on-air hosts no-showing in protest, were all reinstated. Rolling Stone calls KXNO "one radio station (that) fought iHeartMedia's cuts... and won".	
17	Adult Top 40 KQKQ-FM—Council Bluffs/Omaha becomes the first station in the market to launch an all-female morning show, as it pairs up current host Nikki Oswald with afternoon host Laura Blenkush, the latter succeeding Matt Tompkins, who moved over to sister station KOOO in the same slot.	
17	Colorado Public Radio takes over the operations of KRCC—Colorado Springs and its network of stations in the state. The NPR-affiliated news outlet will continue to utilize its local staff and retain its identity, although their news operations and programs will be incorporated into CPR's Denver operations.	
21	Talk KKLS/K284BA—Rapid City flips to classic country "The Cowboy" after eight days of stunting with a loop of Lil Nas X’s "Old Town Road".	
23	The European Radio and Digital Audio Show is held in Paris, running until 25 January.	
24	Talk WAKR/W228EL—Akron, Ohio, flips to full-service/soft AC as "Soft Hits 93.5"; sports play-by-play and the morning drive news block are retained. It is the third time WAKR has switched from talk to a music format, having done so previously in 1994 and 1999.	
27	Sports WARF—Akron, Ohio, relaunches as "Fox Sports 1350: The Gambler" with programming from VSiN after a day-long stunt looping the Kenny Rogers song of the same name. The oldest surviving radio station in Akron, WARF is repositioned to be a part of iHeartMedia's Cleveland cluster despite the Akron city of license and Cuyahoga Falls transmitter location remaining unchanged.	
31	CHR KPTY/K297BS—Waterloo, Iowa, switches to classic country "107.3 Hank FM".	

=== February ===
Date	Event	Source
1	Citing an inability to pay performance royalties for any recorded music, CHR WCKR—Hornell, New York flips to CBS Sports Radio. The station reverts to CHR by August 14.	
3	Rush Limbaugh announces that he has been diagnosed with advanced lung cancer and will be taking leaves of absence to undergo treatment. The next day, he is awarded the Presidential Medal of Freedom at the 2020 State of the Union Address, becoming only the second person to earn the medal for contributions to radio, after 2005 recipient Paul Harvey.	
5	Radio New Zealand attempts to convert its FM classical music network RNZ Concert to a youth service, shifting its classical music broadcasting to an automated programme on its AM channel and in streaming format. The decision was reversed within days after listener criticism.	
7	Dutch DJ Lex Gaarthuis is forced to apologise after playing a "parody" song called "‘Voorkomen is beter dan Chinezen" ("Prevention is better than Chinese") on Radio 10 the previous evening. The song, which implies that Chinese food is responsible for the spread of coronavirus, triggered thousands of complaints.	
10	Classic country/Opry WSM—Nashville, the last clear-channel station in the United States with a music format, drops its All Nighter overnight program and a midday talk show, in addition to moving a daily bluegrass program to Saturday afternoons exclusively; this followed a change in general managers.	
13	World Radio Day: UNESCO and UN calls on radio stations to uphold diversity, both in their newsroom and on the airwaves. This year's theme is "Radio and diversity".	
13	World Radio Day: A team from William Paterson University broadcasts a three-hour show from the former home of Guglielmo Marconi in Bologna, Italy.	
14	The Bridge branding returns to CHNV-FM in Nelson, British Columbia.	
17	The BBC's Deputy Political Editor, South African-born journalist John Pienaar, announces that he is leaving to join Times Radio, a new station set up by Rupert Murdoch.	
18	The Oakland Athletics abandon radio for a team exclusive channel on TuneIn, exiting their deal with KTRB to broadcast the team's games after one season and complaints from fans over poor promotion and flow from the station's conservative talk radio format. Athletics games in the Bay Area market will be heard exclusively on TuneIn instead of radio, a first in Major League Baseball and the team will go without a flagship station. On July 30, less than a week into the pandemic-shortened 2020 season, the Athletics voided its agreement with TuneIn and signed with iHeartMedia, who will air games on KNEW—Oakland.	
18	Talk KTBL—Albuquerque switches to active rock as "The Pit", relayed over translator K233CG (94.5 FM), which previously relayed KKOB.	
21	XHCPBS-FM, La Voz de los Chontales, begins broadcasting on 98.7 FM in Spanish, Chontal Maya (yokot'an), Ch'ol and Ayapa Zoque from Nacajuca in the Mexican state of Tabasco. The original station was closed down in 1990 for political reasons.	
23	WZPW—Peoria rebrands from "Peoria’s 92.3" to "Z92.3" as part of the relaunch of its morning show; no other changes are made.	

=== March ===
Date	Event	Source
11	The National Association of Broadcasters announces that the annual NAB Show, scheduled for April 18–22, has been cancelled due to the COVID-19 pandemic, the first time in the organization’s history to do so.	
11	Prior to the tipoff of the game between the Utah Jazz and the Oklahoma City Thunder in Oklahoma City, the sports stations from Cumulus Media's Oklahoma City cluster (WKY, WWLS-FM and KWPN) and Larry H. Miller Communications' Salt Lake City cluster (KZNS and KZNS-FM) report that Rudy Gobert was placed on the Thunder's injury list due to an unidentified illness, causing the game to be initially postponed. Shortly afterwards, the NBA announces that the league would suspend its season following the conclusion of that night's games after Gobert tested positive for the coronavirus. This event resulted in the MLB and NHL suspending operations the following day, dealing a major blow to sports radio stations around the entire United States.	
12	The studios of Cumulus Media’s Atlanta cluster (CHR WWWQ, country WKHX-FM and active rock WNNX, along with several syndicated programs that originated from the studios) are quarantined after an employee tested positive for coronavirus, having come in contact with a friend who was visiting several days earlier. As a result, air staffers at the three stations became remote workers.	
13	The Grand Ole Opry announces it will forego live audiences and reduce airings to one day per week, continuing its Saturday night flagship broadcast without a studio audience in response to the COVID-19 pandemic in Tennessee. The show eventually resumes live audiences in October.	
18	Metro Manila, Philippines, stations DZIQ—Makati and DZSR—Quezon City temporarily sign off due to the COVID-19 pandemic. While DZSR returns to the air in 2022, DZIQ's license lapses at the end of the year.	
19	After a few days of stunting, classic hits KLNC—Lincoln flips to classic rock as "105.3 The Bone".	
20–23	In the wake of the cancellation of the Ultra Music Festival in Miami, the organizers have partnered up with SiriusXM to air a virtual broadcast featuring the acts that were scheduled to perform on air during the weekend the event was supposed to be held, airing on Diplo’s Revolution.	
20	Entercom AC KEZK-FM—St. Louis converts to an unusual spring Christmas music format to "lift spirits as the coronavirus quarantine continues".	
20	A new environmental radio station, Gorilla FM, based at the Kahuzi-Biega National Park, Democratic Republic of Congo, begins broadcasting, with financial support from Switzerland and support from NGO Internews and Radio France Internationale.	
20	The FCC denies the renewals of, and revokes the licenses for, four Greater St. Louis AM stations owned by Entertainment Media Trust: classic country/talk KQQZ—Fairview Heights, Illinois, oldies KZQZ—St. Louis, KFTK-FM simulcast KFTK—East St. Louis, Illinois, and silent WQQW—Highland, Illinois. A prior FCC investigation revealed Bob Romanik—a convicted felon and controversial KQQZ host—was a silent partner in the purchase of all four stations from 2006 to 2012 without notifying the commission, with Entertainment Media Trust acting as a shell company. KFTK promptly signs off (translator K254CR is reassigned to KFTK-FM) but KQQZ and KZQZ defiantly continue broadcasting as de facto pirate radio until April 12, 2020; Romanik hosts a final broadcast two days earlier. KZQZ's deletion also ends the history of a station which signed on in 1922 as WEB, one of the oldest in St. Louis.	
23	NPR debuts a new call-in show The National Conversation, an offshoot of All Things Considered, which exclusively discusses the COVID-19 pandemic in the United States.	
25	The University of Washington’s NPR-affiliated KUOW-FM—Seattle announces it will no longer carry the live feed of the White House Coronavirus Task Force's daily briefings, citing a number of false claims and exaggerations, specifically from President Donald Trump's portion of the briefings. The station will continue to summarize them in later newscasts.	
26	Adult hits WQTX—Lansing flips to rhythmic AC "Stacks 92.1", a reference to the three smokestacks at Lansing Board of Water & Light’s Eckert Power Plant which serve as the tallest buildings in the Lansing skyline.	
27	Cox Media Group’s CHR WFLC—Miami temporarily rebrands from "Hits 97.3" to "97.3 Quarantine Radio" to discourage listeners from further large public gatherings due to stay-at-home orders put in place by local governments. As a result, all on-air staffers became remote workers, playing into the temporary branding, including daily coronavirus pandemic updates, along with long commercial-free stretches of EDM remixes in overnights hosted by Al P, billed as "Fit Mixes". On May 29, WFLC went "under construction" ahead of a June 3 "relaunch" of its format.	
30	Entravision radio station KKPS Brownsville, Texas drops its Regional Mexican format for Bilingual Rhythmic CHR format, which can be heard on KHHM in Sacramento, California and simulcaster KCVR-FM branded as “Fuego 99.5”	

=== April ===
Date	Event	Source
1	DWSS—Mandaluyong temporarily signs off due to the COVID-19 pandemic.	
5	KXPN-FM—Wichita Falls, Texas becomes the first sports station to drop the format due to the COVID-19 pandemic that shut down major sporting events, switching to classic country as a simulcast of "Hank FM" KTFW-FM—Glen Rose/Ft. Worth.	
6	Adult Top 40 KRJO—Monroe, Louisiana, returns to classic country as "99.7 The Legend", having dropped the format three years earlier.	
10	Adult Top 40 WNTR—Indianapolis begins stunting with Christmas music, ostensibly to offer listeners something positive during the COVID-19 pandemic; the format shifts to mainstream AC on May 14.	
10	Syndicated morning show Brooke & Jubal (based at KQMV—Seattle) is renamed Brooke & Jeffery in the Morning when Jeffery Dubrow is named as the show's new co-host. Original co-host Jubal Fresh departed Hubbard Broadcasting-owned KQMV in September 2019 and had not appeared on the show since, eventually resurfacing at KBKS-FM.	
12	A storm knocks over the transmitter tower of KPBA—Pine Bluff, Arkansas, which also relays KTPB, KTRN, and KDPX.	
13	The Rio Grande Valley sees two stations flipping formats within the course of two hours, all coming from Entravision, who flipped CHR KVLY—Edinburg back to AC, which was done to help the recent launch of former Regional Mexican-turned-bilingual rhythmic KKPS—Brownsville, and active rock KFRQ—Harlingen switching to classic rock.	
13	Ralph Vaughan Williams’s "The Lark Ascending" was chosen as the winner of the 2020 Classic FM Hall of Fame in the United Kingdom.	
20	Alternative WRDA—Canton/Atlanta switches to Spanish CHR "Z105.7", temporarily simulcast on WBZY—Bowdon, which had featured the format since October 2018.	
22	"Jack FM" KQCJ—Cambridge, Illinois/Quad Cities switches to alternative as "Planet 93.9", reviving a branding last used on KORB—Bettendorf during the 1990s.	
24	AZ Research PPL, commissioned by the Association of Radio Operators for India, reports that radio listenership in the country has reached a figure of 51 million.	
26	DWKX—Mandaluyong, another Filipino radio station, temporarily signs off as a result of the COVID-19 pandemic.	

=== May ===
Date	Event	Source
1	CHR WNFN—Nashville rebrands from "i106.7" to "Hot 106.7", coinciding with a signal and coverage upgrade.	
3	Alternative KPOI-FM—Honolulu flips to AC as "105.9 The Wave".	
4	WBZY—Bowdon/Atlanta flips from a temporary simulcast of WRDA—Canton to mainstream urban as "105.3 The Beat". This completes a migration of WBZY's Spanish CHR format and air staff to the former WRDA (renamed WBZY) and a migration of WRDG—Union City's mainstream urban format and "Beat" name to the former WBZY (renamed WRDG). The former WRDG (renamed WBZW) becomes a full-time simulcast of WBZY.	
4	KDLW—Albuquerque dropped the CHR format and began stunting with sweepers coinciding with Cinco de Mayo (May 5), leading up to a flip to Regional Mexican as "Zeta 106.3."	
5	ABS-CBN's radio stations DZMM and MOR ceased its operations due to cease-and-desist order by the Philippines National Telecommunications Commission (NTC), together with ABS-CBN and S+A after their congressional franchise expired on May 4. These 4 networks signed off in the evening at 7:52 pm (PST).	
8	ABS-CBN's radio station DZMM TeleRadyo went back on-air via cable and online and renamed as TeleRadyo.	
18	Classic country KRRW—St. James-Fairmont, Minnesota, relaunches as adult Top 40 "Emoji 101.5" KEMJ.	
20	Travelers information KRZD/K298CI—Springfield, Missouri, flips to mainstream rock as "Z107.5."	
22	Adult hits WJDX-FM—Kosciusko/Jackson switches to mainstream urban as "Real 105.1."	
22	KFCO—Denver shifted from hip hop-leaning rhythmic Top 40 back to CHR, reviving the "Hot 107.1" brand.	
22	Classic rock KTSR—Lake Charles, Louisiana flips to adult Top 40 as "92.1 The Bridge."	
28	CHR WODS—Boston flips to adult hits as "Big 103" WBGB.	
28	The facilities of regional Mexican KMNV/K239CJ—Minneapolis–Saint Paul is among the buildings that were destroyed in a series of riots amid protests of the murder of George Floyd on May 26, and whose Third Precinct station where the officers were assigned to was set on fire during the evening that later spread to other buildings in the vicinity of Lake Street and 27th Avenue South. The AM had been off the air since March for repairs but the COVID-19 pandemic has delayed work on the equipment. The owners announced that the station will be off the air until further notice. By the next week it returned to the air with the assistance and use of the facilities of community radio station KFAI.	

=== June ===
Date	Event	Source
1	Frosty, Heidi & Frank Show co-host Frosty Stillwell departs AOR KLOS—Los Angeles after taking leave from the station beginning in late March.	
2	Just one day after being placed on administrative leave after making insensitive comments about the Black Lives Matter movement in a tweet to former Sacramento Kings Center DeMarcus Cousins, Grant Napear, who handles play by play for the aforementioned NBA franchise on NBC Sports California, announces his resignation from both the organization and the network, and at the same time was also fired from Kings flagship radio outlet KHTK by parent owner Bonneville International, who were upset over his remarks and not making a sincere apology. Napear had called Kings games on either television or radio since 1988 and had been a part of KHTK’s lineup in various roles since 1997.	
3	CHR KORQ—Winters/Abilene, Texas, switches to farm–classic country "Q Country 96.1".	
3	iHeartMedia classic rock/hot talk WAIO—Rochester, New York fires afternoon hosts Kimberly Ray and Barry Beck following comments made on their June 2 show, in which the duo were discussing the ongoing protests in the city over police brutality and racism. Kimberly asked if a group of men beating a couple with a 2×4 were acting "N-wordly", while Beck followed "If you look like a thug, act like a thug and you have three people beating a white woman with a 2x4, by god, you’re a thug." The discussion also including asking whether they were allowed to call people "N-wordish". The comments sparked outrage from listeners and community leaders, including morning host Deanna King (who threatened to quit if the duo remained on air). This is the second time that Ray and Beck were fired from a Rochester station for making insensitive remarks, after being fired from their morning show at Entercom adult hits WBZA in 2014 for hateful comments against the transgender community.	
4	A pair of Piedmont Triad Top 40s, Dick Broadcasting’s Mainstream WKZL and Entercom’s rhythmic WJMH, paired their respective morning shows, Jared & Katie in the Morning and 3 Live Crew, together for a simulcast to discuss the continuing conflict involving police brutality against minorities, ongoing protests, and systematic racism that has spilled over into the Greensboro-High Point-Winston-Salem Metropolitan area since the murder of George Floyd on May 26.	
5	Republic Records announced that it will no longer use the word "Urban" from describing departments, employee titles, and music styles. The move comes as the term, made famous in the late 1970s by Frankie Crocker when he used it to describe the urban contemporary format at WBLS New York City, has lived out its usefulness with radio stations in the genre moving to distance themselves from the name altogether.	
6	Dance/EDM WZFL—Miami acknowledged on its Facebook page that it had terminated afternoon host Jordan Sanchez over insensitive remarks he made on his social media pages in April, when he was placed on suspension.	
15	The studios of two Tampa-St. Petersburg radio properties are quarantined after its personalities tested positive for COVID-19. Three air staffers from Beasley Broadcasting Group’s rhythmic Top 40 WLLD’s Orlando and The Freak Show, PD/host Orlando Davis and co-hosts Broderick "Buckwheat" Scott and Jose "Joey Franchize" Alvarado, all announced their positive tests on social media, resulting in Beasley closing its facilities to all but essential personnel and having its staffers at classic rock WPBB, Business Talk WHFS, country WQYK-FM, classic hits WRBQ-FM, and Spanish Top 40 WYUU broadcast from home until further notice. Hours later Cox Media Group follows suit after Hot Talk WHPT morning host Mike Calta and his co-host Anthony "Spanish" Polichemi confirmed their results on-air during their show, resulting in its sister stations, Adult Standards WDUV, CHR WPOI, AC WWRM, classic rock WXGL, and alternative WSUN, to also send its staffers home to do their broadcasts.	
26	Sports CJMB-FM—Peterborough, Ontario flips to alternative rock "Freq 90.5" but retains all sports play-by play.	

=== July ===
Date	Event	Source
1	Forever Media’s rimshot Pittsburgh country outlets WOGG—Oliver (which covers the southern portion of the market) and WOGI—Moon Township (which covers the majority of the market from the western portion of the area) dropped their separate programming and becomes a simulcast, a move buoyed by a ratings increase and to become more competitive against Entercom’s WDSY-FM and iHeartMedia’s WPGB in the battle for country listeners in the market.	
1	ESPN Radio KQDJ/K296HH—Jamestown, North Dakota, switches to soft AC.	
1	Mainstream rock CHKS-FM—Sarnia, Ontario, flips to classic hits "Cool 106.3".	
2	CHR WAKZ—Sharpsville, Pennsylvania/Youngstown, Ohio, flips to mainstream urban as "Real 95.9".	
3	Oldies WJJL—Niagara Falls/Buffalo, New York, flips to adult standards as WEBR, reviving a call sign long used by the current WDCZ.	
6	iHeartMedia announces that effective immediately, it will no longer use the term "Urban Contemporary" or "Urban Adult Contemporary" across their properties using the format, including its co-owned Mediabase charts. The "Urban Contemporary" outlets and "Urban" charts will now go by "R&B/Hip-Hop", while "Urban AC" will now be identified as "R&B".	
9	Adult Top 40 WMIA-FM—Miami flips to 1990s hits as "Totally 93.9."	
12	Three of the six stations owned by Ed Stolz is transferred to a court-ordered receivership trust after a lawsuit brought on by ASCAP and sixteen other music copyright holders. The three outlets involved are CHRs KREV—Alameda/San Francisco, KRCK-FM—Palm Springs, and KFRH—Las Vegas. The three stations were purchased by VCY America on December 30, and will convert to non-commercial Religious programming in 2021.	
13	Bartis-Russell Broadcasting’s talk WSMN/W237FA—Nashua, New Hampshire, fired host Dianna Ploss and cancelled her brokered pro-conservative/pro-Trump program after she posted a video on Facebook Live of her proudly displaying a series of racial harassment towards Hispanics and asking them to speak English, as well as a confrontational exchange with an African American security guard over not wearing a mask.	
13	Classic rock WZPR—Nags Head, North Carolina, switches to talk.	
13	DWSS 1494 returned to the airwaves after signing off for three months due to the COVID-19 pandemic.	
16	Just two days after ViacomCBS fired him from his hosting duties on VH1's Wild 'n Out after 15 years for failing to apologize for perpetuating anti-Semitism in comments made on an episode of his YouTube show in June, when he interviewed Public Enemy's Professor Griff, Nick Cannon announces that he is leaving radio indefinitely, ending his one-year tenure at KPWR—Los Angeles.	
17	Alternative KLLT—Columbia/St. Louis switches to urban AC as "Majic", carrying the format over from KATZ-HD2/W279AQ—Bridgeton. This is the fifth incarnation for the "Majic" branding in St. Louis, as it originated in 1979 on 107.7 FM, then moved to 104.9 FM in 1997, and then to 100.3 FM in 2012 before being dropped two years later.	
20	Classic rock KYOZ/K239CL—Spokane switches to regional Mexican as "Ke Buena 95.7".	
20	Talk WLW—Cincinnati eliminates political talk from their overnight America’s Trucking Network after an unspecified topic discussed by host Steve Sommers led to complaints directed at WLW parent iHeartMedia. Sommers is fired in early November amid a series of layoffs at iHeartMedia, ending a 36-year run for the Sommers family on WLW's overnight shift dating to Steve's father, "Truckin' Bozo" Dale Sommers.	
27	SB Nation Radio rebrands as SportsMap Radio Network, the 29 year-old network's sixth name change.	
27	Rhythmic Top 40 KUAM-FM—Hagatna, Guam, flips to AC "Breeze 93.9."	
27	Urban AC KATZ-HD2/W279AQ—Bridgeton, and classic country WIZE—Springfield/Dayton, Ohio, become affiliates of Black Information Network.	
31	CHR WLMI—Lansing switches to classic rock as "Cruisin’ 92.9".	
31	CJOC-FM—Lethbridge, Alberta, reverts to its former branding after a little over a year as "Juice FM".	

=== August ===
Date	Event	Source
1	DWSS—Mandaluyong temporarily signed off again due to the COVID-19 pandemic.	
3	A shuffle occurs at Lotus Communications's Las Vegas cluster as a result of the company getting the rights to broadcast Las Vegas Raiders games. KRLV—Las Vegas flips from sports betting to mostly Raiders content as "Raider Nation Radio 920 AM" as the team's new flagship station, while KRLV's former "The Game" format moves to KLAV—Las Vegas, flipping to the format from ranchero music.	
20	CHR KBKS-FM—Tacoma/Seattle dropped the "Kiss" branding after 24 years and rebrands as "Hits 106.1."	
28	Gospel WGUS-FM—Augusta, Georgia, switches to AC "Sunny 102.7".	

=== September ===
Date	Event	Source
3	Country WEBG—Chicago flips to mainstream rock as "Rock 95.5" WCHI-FM, bringing the format back to Chicago after nearly two years and to 95.5 FM for the first time since 1982 (as WMET-FM).	
4	AC CHMX-FM—Regina, Saskatchewan flips to rhythmic classic hits as "Play 92.1".	
4	Mainstream rock CHQX-FM—Prince Albert, Saskatchewan, switches to classic hits "Beach Radio 101.5".	
8	Hot AC WQQO—Sylvania/Toledo, Ohio flips to CHR "Q105", adding The Bert Show and reassigning incumbent morning host Eric Chase to afternoons.	
8	Radio Free Europe/Radio Liberty re-launches its service in Hungary.	
10	iHeartMedia acquires WWRL—New York City, a station that had historically carried formats serving the city's Black community, to be its new network affiliate for the Black Information Network beginning November 2. BIN programming currently is available in the New York radio market via WWPR-FM's third HD Radio subchannel.	
13	Entercom centralizes operations of its country music and alternative stations. In the case of alternative, air talent from WNYL—New York City are voice-tracked across its stations, many of which are rebranded as "ALT" in markets where that branding is not used by another station, dismissing all local airstaff. For country stations, flagship station WNSH will originate the midday and late-night shows across all country stations, with other dayparts retaining their local hosts. The moves are being made to provide a single, unified sound across the United States for Entercom's stations.	
15	Internet-only radio station VintageRadio.SG is launched in Singapore.	
22	AC WGKS—Paris/Lexington, Kentucky flips to classic hits, while classic hits WWRW—Mount Sterling begins stunting, first redirecting listeners to WGKS, then airing Christmas music beginning in early October.	
25	In an extreme case of Christmas creep (breaking the previous mid-October record by several weeks), WWIZ—West Middlesex, Pennsylvania/Youngstown, Ohio, for the second consecutive year, becomes the first non-stunting station in the United States to flip to Christmas music for the entire season. WWIZ is one of several stations (others including WWRW and WVEZ) flipping to Christmas music early in hopes of hastening the end of 2020 and the COVID-19 pandemic.	

=== October ===
Date	Event	Source
5	DZSR returned to the airwaves after a 7-month hiatus due to the COVID-19 pandemic and simulcast via DepEd TV.	
18	DZSR temporarily signs off again due to the COVID-19 pandemic.	
19	DZRM returns to the airwaves after a 3-year hiatus and simulcast via DepEd TV.	

=== November ===
Date	Event	Source
5	The Mohawk Valley gets its first Spanish language radio outlet, as WNRS—Herkimer, New York, and its Utica-licensed translator flip to Spanish Tropical music as "El Zorro."	
19	Bell Media's two FM outlets in Windsor, Ontario/Detroit, Michigan, switch formats: CIMX-FM—Windsor drops alternative rock after 30 years in favor of country, while CIDR-FM—Windsor switches from adult album alternative to CHR "Virgin Radio". At the same time, Entercom's WDZH—Detroit segues from soft adult contemporary to alternative under the "ALT" brand.	
23	Entercom and Radio One swapped stations in Charlotte, Philadelphia, Washington, D.C. and St. Louis, the latter seeing Entercom's newly acquired IP WFUN-FM's calls and its Adult R&B format displacing CHR KNOU on the same day; WFUN's former license is sold to Gateway Creative Broadcasting, which flipped the 95.5 signal to Christian rhythmic Top 40 and new calls KXBS. In Philadelphia, Entercom's KYW's all-news format adds an FM simulcast via newly acquired WPHI-FM, with the mainstream urban format returning to Radio One's WRNB for the first time since August 2011.	
25	"Jack FM" WBUF—Buffalo, New York reverts to active rock, a format it held from 2001 to 2004.	

=== December ===
Date	Event	Source
1	Minneapolis-St. Paul–based Go Media, controlled by the family of Minnesota Twins owner Carl Pohlad, sells alternative KQGO—Edina, Minnesota, and rhythmic Top 40 KZGO—St. Paul to Educational Media Foundation for $2.45 million. Both stations, branded "Go", immediately dismissed all airstaff and shifted to a jockless presentation until the sale closed on April 12, 2021; KQGO becomes the market's Air1 outlet and KZGO is subsequently divested to a third party. This sale ends the Pohlad family's run as a broadcaster, having purchased KQGO in 2007 and making it the Minnesota Twins Radio Network flagship from 2013 to 2017.	
3	Rogers Media rebrands all-news–talk "News 1310" CIWW—Ottawa, Ontario, as "CityNews Radio", a brand extension of Rogers' Citytv network and CityNews news service. The rebrand comes with the addition of an FM simulcast via former country CKBY-FM—Smiths Falls, Ontario, (renamed CJET-FM) while "Jack FM" CJET-FM—Smiths Falls assumes the country format (as "Country 92.5") and CKBY-FM calls. Rogers unveils plans to rebrand all of their all-news and talk stations under the "CityNews Radio" name by the following June.	
4	Active rock CFDV-FM—Red Deer, Alberta, flips to classic hits "106.7 Rewind Radio".	
4	CJCD-FM—Yellowknife, Northwest Territories, drops its "Moose" branding after 6 years and rebrands to "100.1 True North Radio".	
8	Howard Stern extends his contract with SiriusXM, which includes his eponymous show and surrounding content, until the end of 2025, and rights to his archival content until the end of 2032.	
27	In a move timed with Boxing Day, Bell Media rebrands and relaunches ten stations (AC outlets CHQM-FM—Vancouver, British Columbia, CILK-FM—Kelowna, British Columbia, CJMJ-FM—Ottawa, Ontario, CHRE-FM—St. Catharines, Ontario, and CFJR-FM—Brockville, Ontario; CHR outlets CJMG-FM—Penticton, British Columbia, CKPT-FM—Peterborough, Ontario, and CIBX-FM—Fredericton, New Brunswick; Hot AC outlets CFLY-FM—Kingston, Ontario, and CIOO-FM—Halifax, Nova Scotia) as "Move Radio", all featuring a hybrid AC/hot AC format. The local airstaffs for all ten stations are retained.	

== Debuts ==
Date	Event	Source
January 13	Smooth jazz DWBM-FM—Quezon City is relaunched as CHR "Q Radio 105.1".	
January 27	Skyview Networks begins syndicating KPWR—Los Angeles' Nick Cannon's morning program, returning Cannon back to radio syndication after a 2012 health-related withdrawal. This program is withdrawn by Skyview on July 16 after past anti-Semitic remarks attributed to Cannon surfaced, resulting in him taking an indefinite leave from radio.	
March 25	Radio Quarantine is launched in Kolkata, India, by a group of teachers and students in response to social isolation protocols resulting from the outbreak of the COVID-19 pandemic in West Bengal.	
April 13	KRIX—Port Isabel, Texas launches with classic rock targeting the lower Rio Grande Valley, which comes on the same day as rival KFRQ—Harlingen’s shift to the aforementioned format from active rock just hours earlier.	
June 30	iHeartMedia launches the all-news Black Information Network, a "24-hour service dedicated to news coverage from a Black perspective." The new network consists of 15 affiliates in markets with a majority African American population.	
August 17	XEPRS-AM—Playas de Rosarito/Tijuana, Baja California, Mexico, relaunches as English-language sports "The Mightier 1090" following a week-long loop of a retrospective on the border blaster's history. The relaunch, billed as "the first station in the cloud, with no studios", comes after a five-year lease to program the station is established with Flagstaff, Arizona advertising executive Bill Hagan. XEPRS had been relaying KJAV—Alamo, Texas since April 10, 2019, after the collapse of prior station operator Broadcast Company of the Americas.	
August 18	Apple Inc. rebrands Beats 1 as Apple Music 1 while launching AC-oriented Apple Music Hits and country-oriented Apple Music Country.	
September 1	Hubbard Broadcasting launches PodMN, a podcast app devoted to Minnesota and Minneapolis-centered content.	

== Endings ==
Date	Event	Source
January 16	Australian community radio station Stereo 974, broadcasting to Melbourne since 1978, ceases broadcasting, possibly as a result of financial difficulties.	
January 20	After 40 years as a part-timer, Migala Communications signs off brokered ethnic station WCEV—Cicero/Chicago, which operated in a time-share (1–10 p.m. Monday through Friday, 1–8:30 p.m. Saturday and 5 a.m.–10 p.m. on Sundays) with Midway Broadcasting's Regional Mexican WRLL—Chicago. This arrangement had been in place since 1979, replacing WVON, which surrendered its license in 1975 when owner Globetrotter Broadcasting purchased WNUS/WNUS-FM—Chicago from McClendon Broadcasting. Despite signing off, WRLL does not become a 24–hour operation until October 18, 2021, following the formal cancellation of WCEV's license on July 31, 2021.	
February 22	Active rock WAAF—Westborough/Worcester/Boston ends a nearly 50-year run as a rock outlet after being purchased by Educational Media Foundation for $10.75 million. Former air talent Gregg Hughes and Anthony Cumia (Opie and Anthony), Bob Rivers, Peter Zipfel, Greg Hill and John Osterlind are on-air guests during the station's last day, along with Aerosmith drummer Tom Hamilton. During the final hour, the airstaff reveals that a format relaunch had been planned prior to the sale, including a new morning show; WAAF had been running music sweeps in morning drive after Greg Hill's transfer to WEEI-FM the previous July. EMF converts WAAF to K-Love WKVB, while Entercom transfers WAAF's format and brand to digital subchannels of WEEI-FM and WWBX, and "parks" the callsign on the former WBZU in Scranton, Pennsylvania.	
March 17	Entercom alternative KROQ-FM—Los Angeles cancels Kevin in the Morning, ending a 31-year run for Kevin Ryder, who confirmed that he was fired on March 18, along with co-hosts Allie MacKay and Jensen Karp. Ryder’s former partner Gene ‘Bean’ Baxter left KROQ in November 2019 to move back to his native England after announcing his retirement from broadcasting.	
March 22	Fox Sports Radio affiliate WGL—Ft. Wayne ceased operations, due to a lack of an FM translator and the COVID-19 pandemic that made it financially difficult to continue operations. WGL has since returned to the airwaves as an adult hits station.	
March 24	Religious outlets WPFR & WPFR-FM—Terre Haute ceased operations, due to the passing of its owner in January.	
March 31	NBC Sports Radio ceased operations.	
March 31	Christian preaching outlet WHVN/W232BP—Charlotte ceased operations, citing the 2014 passing of its owner and financial difficulties. The station’s 8.1-acre transmitter site was recently granted rezoning approval by the Charlotte city council to be developed with up to 12,500 square feet of medical office space and up to 25 residential units by Flagship Healthcare Properties.	
April 3	CKOO-FM—Kelowna, British Columbia, signs off after ownership files for bankruptcy. After a contested sale in which competing owners allege the license was effectively surrendered (which the CRTC refutes) the station returns to the air one year later as CKOV-FM.	
April 10	Peter "Kane" Deibler was let go as host of the Premiere Networks-syndicated The Kane Show (based out of co-owned iHeartMedia’s WIHT—Washington, D.C.) after 15 years, and is rebranded as Your Morning Show effective April 13; sister station WFLZ-FM—Tampa dropped the revamped show the same day in favor of local content after negative feedback from listeners. His departure also ended his weekend Top 40/Dance program Club Kane, whose social media accounts were eliminated and the list of affiliates removed; the final installment aired May 3 under temporary hosts (It was replaced by "The Vibe" with Tanya Radd & EJ on May 24).	
April 12	In separate moves, five AM radio stations (KZGD, KCKX, KNUI, WZBO and WCNC) go silent, all citing financial hardships and fallout from the COVID-19 pandemic. However, on July 6, 2020, KNUI returned to airwaves as a country station.	
April 30	WNPV—Lansdale, Pennsylvania ceased operations. The nonpolitical talk radio station with some hyperlocal content serving the North Penn Valley had struggled to maintain its audience and suffered from an ongoing industry-wide advertiser exodus away from talk radio.	
May 1	After 66 years, Guam’s first radio station, KUAM, ceased operations. The station’s Chamorro music and information format moved over to its online platform.	
May 5	DZMM 630 and MOR 101.9 Manila are off the air due to cease-and-desist order of NTC.	
June 13	American Public Media abruptly cancels Live from Here, unceremoniously ending a 46-year streak for old-time radio revival programming on the network (including the show and its predecessors A Prairie Home Companion and The American Radio Company of the Air). The cancellation is among several cuts at APM and parent organization Minnesota Public Radio, which faced a "rapid loss of revenue" and diverted its remaining resources to news programming such as Marketplace.	
June 27	The Cigar Dave Show is withdrawn from syndication after 25 years. It will be replaced by two podcasts, one focusing exclusively on cigars and the other a general men's interest talk show.	
June 30	WLNZ, the Lansing Community College radio station, ceased operations. It ceased original programming March 13 due to the COVID-19 pandemic.	
July 12	Langer Broadcasting’s Boston outlets, Portuguese simulcasts WSRO/W271CU Ashland-Framingham and WBAS/W268CP West Yarmouth, and brokered mainstream urban WZBR/W251CR Dedham-Medford, sign off the air. The latter is continuing to operate as a webcaster.	
July 31	Mike Golic Sr. ended his 25-year run as ESPN Radio's morning host. His hosting run spanned three co-hosts (Tony Bruno, Mike Greenberg and Trey Wingo).	
August 1	Rock, Roll & Remember was withdrawn from syndication. The show had been in reruns for 16 years, following host Dick Clark's debilitating stroke and eventual 2012 death.	
August 9	Blair Garner involuntarily exited Nash FM, ending a 27-year run in national syndication dating to his hosting of After Midnite. Garner's cancellation comes amid cutbacks at Cumulus Media.	
August 28	MOR 101.9 Manila leaves the airwaves due to the House of Representatives of the Philippines 70-11 vote denying the franchise renewal for ABS-CBN.	
August 30	Westwood One News ceased operations, citing "extraordinary circumstances in the current marketplace."	
September 26	Only a Game ended production and syndication as part of a series of cuts to flagship station WBUR-FM.	
November 22	Mobile, Alabama radio station owner Buddy Tucker retires from broadcasting, taking both of his stations, WMOB and WTOF, off the air. Tucker's age (over 90 years old) is the main reason for the stations being shut down.	
December 29	DWDM-FM drops its Pinas FM brand and changes to a classic hits format, ending a nearly 10-year run of original pilipino music.	
December 31	The Savage Nation was withdrawn from terrestrial radio and continues solely as a podcast, for reasons host Michael Savage is not legally allowed to discuss. As with the also recently cancelled Westwood One News and Blair Garner, Savage's podcast is distributed by Westwood One, which also distributed the show.	
December 31	Orion Samuelson ended his 60-year career in broadcasting. At the time of his retirement he hosted the agriculture-themed weekly Morning Show on WGN and the daily short-form National Farm Report in syndication.	
December 31	Consumer advocate Clark Howard retired from his daily three-hour syndicated radio show, focusing more on his successful websites, though he continues to produce a short-form podcast and commentaries for home station WSB and WSB-TV.	
December 31	Radyo Inquirer 990 leaves Pilipino airwaves due to a lack of funding.	

== Deaths ==
Date	Name	Age	Nationality and notability	Source
January 2	Marian Finucane	69	Irish broadcaster (host of Liveline and The Marian Finucane Show on RTÉ Radio 1)	
January 7	Larry Gogan	81	Irish disc jockey (host of The Golden Hour on RTÉ Gold). Also worked at RTÉ 2fm.	
January 7	Stephen Clements	47	Northern Irish presenter (BBC Radio Ulster)	
January 10	Harold Burson	98	American public relations executive and former reporter on American Forces Network during World War II and the Nuremberg trials	
January 10	Wolfgang Dauner	84	German jazz pianist and radio composer	
January 17	Grant Goldman	69	Australian radio announcer (2GB)	
January 19	Sunanda Patnaik	85	Indian classical vocalist, began her career on All India Radio in Cuttack	
January 23	Calder Prescott	88	New Zealand jazz musician and broadcaster (Otago Access Radio)	
January 28	Harry Harrison	89	American disc jockey (WMCA, WABC, WCBS-FM)	
January 28	Bob Nave	75	American musician (The Lemon Pipers) and broadcaster (WVXU)	
January 28	Nicholas Parsons	96	British actor and broadcaster (host of Just a Minute on BBC Radio 4)	
January 31	Anne Cox Chambers	100	American media proprietor (Cox Enterprises)	
January 31	Mary Higgins Clark	92	American writer (radio work included Portrait of a Patriot)	
February 4	Ljiljana Petrović	81	Serbian singer, former Eurovision contestant	
February 5	Kirk Douglas	103	American actor (radio appearances on Suspense, Lux Radio Theatre and Screen Directors Playhouse)	
February 7	Bal Kudtarkar	98	Indian radio personality	
February 8	Robert Conrad	84	American actor and radio host (was with Cable Radio Network from 2008 to 2019)	
February 14	Reinbert de Leeuw	81	Dutch composer, pianist and conductor (Dutch Public Radio)	
February 23	Zoran Modli	71	Serbian aviator, journalist and radio disc jockey, host of Modulacije	
February 26	Lionel D	61	French radio host and rapper	
March 12	Pete Mitchell	61	English radio DJ and presenter (BBC Radio 2, Virgin Radio)	
March 28	Kerstin Behrendtz	69	Swedish radio presenter	
March 28	Jan Howard	91	American country singer and songwriter (member of the Grand Ole Opry)	
March 29	Joe Diffie	61	American country singer and radio host (aired a daily show on KXBL from 1997 until his death, member of the Grand Ole Opry)	
March 29	Manuel Adolfo Varas	76	Ecuadorian radio journalist, founder of Radio Caravana 750 AM	
April 5	Peter Walker	84	English cricket commentator and presenter	
April 15	Willie Davis	85	American football player (Green Bay Packers) and broadcaster (founder of All Pro Broadcasting, the parent company of WZTI/WLUM-FM—Milwaukee and KHTI—Riverside-San Bernardino; former owner of KACE—Los Angeles and KZDG—Denver)	
April 17	Robin Seymour	94	American DJ at CKLW—Windsor, Ontario, WKNR—Detroit, and American Forces Network	
April 17	Gene Shay	85	American DJ at Philadelphia stations WXPN, WDAS-FM, WMMR, WIOQ and WHYY-FM	
April 20	Ronan O'Rahilly	79	Irish-born media entrepreneur (Radio Caroline)	
April 20	Mike Elliott	82	American air personality, program, and music director at WTMJ—Milwaukee from 1973 to 1985.	
April 21	Mike Anderson	67	American anchorman, reporter, and commentator, began radio career in Birmingham	
April 21	Darrin Arriens	—N/a	American DJ, MD, programmer, and executive (WLNK—Charlotte, KSKS—Fresno, WGYL—West Palm Beach, KKMG and KKFM—Colorado Springs, KHYT—Tucson, WKLQ—Grand Rapids, WJIM-FM—Lansing, WRIF—Detroit, and WLZR-FM—Milwaukee)	
April 21	Jerry Bishop	84	American radio host at Los Angeles stations KLAC, KFI and KIIS-FM, San Diego station KCBQ, and Hartford station WDRC	
May 6	Barry Farber	90	American author and conservative talk show host (WINS, WOR and WMCA New York)	
May 15	Nancy Froelich	—N/a	American radio personality, programmer, and media journalist, known on air as "Kandy Klutch" (WIOQ—Philadelphia, KSLZ and KHTK—St. Louis, WLUM-FM—Milwaukee, WKSS—Hartford, SiriusXM, All Access Music Group)	
May 18	Willard Parr	94	American newscaster at WSRW—Hillsboro, Ohio, from the station's 1956 launch until his retirement in 2018.	
June 3	Jimmy Capps	81	American country musician, member of the Grand Ole Opry house band, The Nashville A-Team and The Wilburn Brothers	
June 10	Tyra Womack	57	On-air personality at WEAA—Baltimore	
June 17	Dan Foster	61	American DJ who worked at U.S. stations Urban One, WWMX—Baltimore, WTBN—Pinellas Park, Florida, as well as Nigerian stations Cool FM and Classic FM 97.3	
June 26	Arnie Ginsburg	93	American DJ and executive in the Boston market	
July 5	Brad Pye Jr.	89	American sports journalist and broadcaster at Los Angeles stations KJLH, KDAY, KRCD, and KYPA	
July 6	Charlie Daniels	83	American musician, eponymous founder of the Charlie Daniels Band (member of the Grand Ole Opry)	
July 9	Jay Severin	69	American radio talk show host (WOR, WTKK, and Blaze Media) and political consultant	
July 10	Steve Sutherland	—N/a	British disc jockey (Choice FM, Galaxy FM)	
July 18	Martha Flores	91	Cuban radio host on Miami stations WQBA, WMIE-FM, and WAQI	
July 20	Michael Brooks	36	American political commentator and co-host of The Majority Report with Sam Seder on Air America Radio	
July 22	Charles Evers	97	American civil rights activist, politician, radio DJ (WHOC—Philadelphia, Mississippi) and host of Lets Talk	
July 26	Chris Needs	68	Welsh radio DJ (BBC Radio Cymru)	
July 30	Herman Cain	74	American businessman, 2012 presidential candidate and talk radio host	
July 31	Bill Mack	88	American country music songwriter and radio disc jockey, founder of the Midnight Cowboy Trucking Show (WBAP, Road Dog Trucking)	
August 1	Jamie Samuelsen	48	American sports talk show host on WXYT-FM—Detroit	
August 3	Ralph Barbieri	74	American sports talk show host on KNBR—San Francisco	
August 4	Pat O'Day	85	American radio broadcaster (KJR, KYYX) and station owner, most active in the Seattle, Washington area.	
August 10	Neil Ocampo	62	Broadcast Journalist of DZMM, DWFM, DZRH, DZRJ, and DZXL.	
August 14	Sonny Fox	73	American disc jockey (SiriusXM, WKIS, WJMK)	
August 22	Richard Cartridge	72	British radio host (BBC Radio Solent, Classic FM)	
September 4	Lloyd Cadena	26	Filipino Disc Jockey of DZMB	
September 19	Jay Pérez	50	Puerto Rican voice-over artist and Disc Jockey of Cadena Salsoul	
October 18	Sid Hartman	100	American sportscaster at WCCO—Minneapolis/St. Paul, Minnesota for 65 years	
October 26	Tony Wyn Jones	77	Welsh disc jockey (BBC Radio One)	
November 8	Alex Trebek	80	Canadian-American broadcaster (CBC Radio, 1961–72)	
November 10	Chris Sullivan	46	American producer, remixer and disc jockey better known as DJ Spinbad. Worked at WHTZ—New York City.	
November 20	Ricky Velasco	61	Former DZMM Reporter	
November 24	Hal Ketchum	67	American country musician (member of the Grand Ole Opry)	
December 2	Walter E. Williams	86	American economist and frequent guest host of The Rush Limbaugh Show	
December 12	Charley Pride	86	American baseball player and country musician, first black singer to become a member of the Grand Ole Opry	

== See also ==
- 2020 in British radio
