= WKJX =

- Elizabeth City, North Carolina; United States
- Broadcast area: Elizabeth City; Outer Banks
- Frequency: 96.7 MHz
- Branding: 96.7 The Coast

Programming
- Format: Hot adult contemporary

Ownership
- Owner: East Carolina Radio of Elizabeth City, Inc.
- Sister stations: WCNC; WERX-FM; WOBR-FM; WOBX; WOBX-FM; WRSF; WZBO; WCXL; WZPR

History
- First air date: 1984

Technical information
- Licensing authority: FCC
- Facility ID: 49156
- Class: C2
- ERP: 50,000 watts
- HAAT: 124 meters (407 ft)
- Transmitter coordinates: 36°12′10.6″N 75°52′21.7″W

Links
- Public license information: Public file; LMS
- Webcast: Listen live
- Website: www.my967thecoast.com

WKJX (96.7 FM, "The Coast") is a hot adult contemporary formatted broadcast radio station licensed to Elizabeth City, North Carolina, serving Elizabeth City and the Outer Banks. WKJX is owned and operated by East Carolina Radio of Elizabeth City, Inc.

While WKJX is primarily heard in North Carolina, it can be heard in extreme south-eastern sections of Hampton Roads.

== History ==
WKJX signed on in 1984 as an automated country music station. In 1998, it was sold to East Carolina Radio who flipped the station's format to urban adult contemporary as "Kiss 97". In the early 2000s, the station became a simulcast of sister-station WOBR-FM.

In May 2004, WKJX increased its power to 50,000 watts and split from the simulcast of WOBR-FM, picking up a Light adult contemporary music format as "Mix 96."

At 9:06 am on April 2, 2010, after stunting the previous day with Bill Cosby stand-up routines, WKJX flipped to an urban hip-hop format, and took on the name "96.7 The Block".

On June 24, 2019 WKJX changed their format from urban hip hop (which moved to WFMZ 104.9 FM Hertford) to hot adult contemporary, branded as "96.7 The Coast".
