= WFMZ (FM) =

- Hertford, North Carolina; United States
- Broadcast area: Elizabeth City, North Carolina; Hampton Roads
- Frequency: 104.9 MHz
- Branding: 104.9 The Block

Programming
- Format: Urban adult contemporary
- Affiliations: The Touch (Westwood One)

Ownership
- Owner: East Carolina Radio, Inc.; (East Carolina Radio of Hertford, Inc.)
- Sister stations: WCNC; WERX-FM; WKJX; WRSF; WOBR; WOBX; WOBX-FM; WZBO

History
- First air date: 1991 (as WKJE)
- Former call signs: WELQ (1986–1988, CP); WKJE (1988–1997)
- Call sign meaning: Family Minded Zone (from former sister station WFMZ-TV in Allentown, Pennsylvania)

Technical information
- Licensing authority: FCC
- Facility ID: 39883
- Class: C2
- ERP: 50,000 watts
- HAAT: 150 meters (490 ft)
- Transmitter coordinates: 36°5′59.6″N 76°28′29.8″W

Links
- Public license information: Public file; LMS
- Webcast: Listen live
- Website: www.1049theblock.com

WFMZ (104.9 MHz) is an FM radio station broadcasting an urban adult contemporary format. Licensed to Hertford, North Carolina, United States, it serves Northeast North Carolina along with parts of the Hampton Roads area. The station is owned by East Carolina Radio, Inc. Its studios are located at 907 B West Ehringhaus Street in Elizabeth City.

== History ==
A construction permit was granted to Maranatha Broadcasting for WFMZ but it would not sign on until 1997. It was a Christian contemporary station known as Praise 105 from 1997 to 2003. It was sold to Convergent Broadcasting in mid-June 2003. It became Classic Hits 104.9 on September 2, 2003, just after 6 am. The first song on Classic Hits 104.9 was "Hotel California" by The Eagles.

In 2006, Convergent Broadcasting LLC sold WFMZ, WYND-FM, WVOD and WZPR to CapSan Media LLC.

Starting May 14, 2009, WFMZ began simulcasting on WZPR 92.3 FM.

Hengooch, LLC bought WZPR, WFMZ, WYND-FM and WVOD in 2010 for $200,000.

On December 5, 2012, due to WOBR-FM relaunching as "The Pirate", WFMZ tweaked their format to classic rock and rebranded as "Classic Rock 104.9 & 92.3".

Max Radio of the Carolinas operates WZPR/WFMZ, WCMS-FM and WCXL as of 2013; WYND-FM was sold.

On May 18, 2018, East Carolina Radio bought WFMZ from Hengooch LLC for $150,000. On August 17, 2018, WFMZ went off the air after East Carolina Radio closed on the sale the day prior. WFMZ returned to the air to do a temporary simulcast of sister station WRSF on November 7 until November 21. On June 3, 2019, at 5 pm, WFMZ returned to simulcast WKJX. The WKJX programming moved over to WFMZ fully on June 24, 2019, when WKJX transitioned to a hot adult contemporary format.

In October 2023, WFMZ shifted its format from mainstream urban to classic hip hop, utilizing Westwood One's "Classic Hip-Hop" 24/7 network, while maintaining the same "104.9 The Block" branding. In November 2024, when Westwood One closed its classic hip hop network, WFMZ shifted its format to urban adult contemporary, utilizing Westwood One’s "The Touch" 24/7 network, and again retained the "104.9 The Block" branding.

== History of call letters ==
The call letters WFMZ were previously assigned to an FM station in Allentown, Pennsylvania.
