= WOBX =

WOBX may refer to:

- WOBX (AM), a radio station (1530 AM) licensed to serve Wanchese, North Carolina, United States
- WOBX-FM, a radio station (98.1 FM) licensed to serve Manteo, North Carolina
- WWLF-LD, a low-power television station (channel 35) licensed to serve Syracuse, New York, United States, which held the call sign WOBX-LP from 1998 to 2016
