= 97.4 FM =

Radio broadcasting frequency

This is a list of radio stations that broadcast on FM frequency 97.4 MHz:

== Australia ==
- 3WRB in Melbourne, Victoria

== China ==
- Beijing Music Radio in Beijing
- GRT Pearl River Economic Radio in Guangzhou
- CNR The Voice of China in Jining

== Ireland ==
- 98FM in north County Dublin

== Malaysia ==
- TraXX FM in Malacca and Northern Johor

== Portugal ==
- pt:Rádio Comercial in Lisbon

== United Kingdom ==
- Capital South Wales in Newport
- Cool FM in Northern Ireland
- Greatest Hits Radio North Dorset in Shaftesbury
- Heart East in Haverhill and Newmarket
- Heart South in Oxford
- Hits Radio Lancashire in Lancashire, England
- MFR in Inverness
- Nation Radio Wales in Cardigan

== Greece ==
- Wave FM in Patras
