= Miami Marlins Radio Network =

American sports radio network

The Miami Marlins Radio Network is a network of 8 radio stations in Florida that broadcast Miami Marlins games. 7 stations broadcast games in English, while another carries a separate broadcast in Spanish. Some stations are simulcast on HD Radio digital multicast channels and/or FM translators. The English announcers are Jack McMullen and Craig Minervini on play-by-play and Rod Allen, Jeff Nelson, Gaby Sánchez, AJ Ramos, and Kelly Saco as the color analyst team, with Stephen Strom as the pregame host and reporter. On the Spanish broadcast, Luis "Yiki" Quintana provides play-by-play and commentary joined by Jose Napoles for home games and Alberto Ferreiro for road games.

== Flagships ==
Callsign	Frequency	Location
WQAM WQAM-FM	560 AM 104.3 FM-HD3	Miami (English Flagship station)
WAQI WAMR-FM	710 AM 107.5 FM-HD2 Miami (Spanish flagship station)	

== Affiliates ==
Callsign	Frequency	Location
WAVK-FM	97.7 FM	Key West
WSTU	1450 AM	Stuart
WBZT	1230 AM	West Palm Beach
W290DB WFSX-FM	105.9 FM 92.5 FM-HD2	Naples
WIXC	1060 AM	Titusville
WEBY W256DL	1330 AM 99.1 FM	Pensacola

== See also ==
- List of XM Satellite Radio channels
- List of Sirius Satellite Radio stations
