= WCNC =

WCNC may refer to:

- WCNC-TV, a television station (channel 24, virtual 36) licensed to Charlotte, North Carolina, United States
- WCNC (AM), a radio station (1240 AM) licensed to Elizabeth City, North Carolina, United States
