= KXSE =

Radio station in Davis, California

Coordinates: 38.657°N 121.721°W

- Davis, California; United States
- Broadcast area: Sacramento metropolitan area
- Frequency: 104.3 MHz (HD Radio)
- Branding: La Suavecita 104.3

Programming
- Format: Spanish Adult hits

Ownership
- Owner: Entravision Communications; (Entravision Holdings, LLC)
- Sister stations: KCVR-FM, KHHM, KNTY, KRCX-FM

History
- First air date: March 1979 (as KYLO at 105.5)
- Former call signs: KYLO (1978–1990); KLCQ (1990–1991); KQBR (1991–1999); KHZZ (1999–2000); KRRE (2000–2004)
- Former frequencies: 105.5 MHz (1978–1991)

Technical information
- Licensing authority: FCC
- Facility ID: 53653
- Class: A
- ERP: 3,400 watts
- HAAT: 133 meters (436 ft)

Links
- Public license information: Public file; LMS
- Website: elboton.com/reno/radio/la-suavecita-104-3/

KXSE (104.3 MHz) is a commercial FM radio station licensed to Davis, California, and serving the Sacramento metropolitan area. The Entravision Communications-owned outlet broadcasts with an ERP of 3,400 watts. The station airs a Spanish-language adult hits format, one of the stations in "La Suavecita" radio network. The studios and offices are in North Sacramento. The transmitter is off Route 102, near Woodland Community College in Woodland, California.

== History ==
=== Country: 1979-1983 ===
In March 1979, the station signed on the air, originally at 105.5 MHz with the call sign KYLO and a progressive country format. The effective radiated power was 3,000 watts.

=== Christian: 1983-1986 ===
In June 1983, the station switched to contemporary Christian music during the day with Christian talk and teaching programs airing on weeknights & morning slots hosted by Randy Zachary.

=== Oldies: 1986-1989 ===
The station continued with Contemporary Christian until summer 1986, when it changed to an automated oldies format.

=== Classic rock: 1989-1991 ===
In 1989, the station changed call letters to KLCQ and installed the first full-time classic rock format in the greater Sacramento area. The presentation was a mix of live announcers and automation.

=== Country: 1991-1993 ===
In 1991, EZ Communications began a local marketing agreement (LMA) and later purchased the station. The format switched to contemporary country music as KQBR, "K-Bear". EZ built a new facility at 104.3, selling it to Progressive Media in late 1993.

=== Smooth jazz: 1993-1997 ===
The new owners relaunched KQBR as smooth jazz "104.3 The Breeze" on November 10, 1993.

=== Urban adult contemporary: 1997-1998 ===
The smooth jazz format lasted until 1997, when they shifted to urban adult contemporary.

=== Rhythmic top 40: 1998 ===
On September 2, 1998, at 8 a.m., it flipped to bilingual rhythmic top 40 as KHZZ ("Z-104.3").

=== Rhythmic oldies: 1998-2000 ===
Just three weeks later, the format shifted to rhythmic oldies.

=== Spanish: 2000-present ===
In October 2000, Entravision acquired the station and flipped it to Spanish adult contemporary, using the co-owned "Radio Romanica" format as KRRE. In 2003, it switched to the "Super Estrella" format, using the KXSE call letters.

In February 2009, KXSE dropped Super Estrella and replaced it with the Spanish adult hits format known as "Jose". In the 2010s, the format switched again to the "La Suavecita" format.

== See also ==
- KSAC-FM
- KLVB (FM)
