= KTSE =

KTSE can refer to:

- KTSE-FM, a Spanish Adult Hits radio station in the Modesto, California area
- K.T.S.E., a 2018 album by American recording artist Teyana Taylor; an acronym of "Keep That Same Energy"
