= WNRP =

- Gulf Breeze, Florida; United States
- Broadcast area: Pensacola metropolitan area
- Frequency: 1620 kHz
- Branding: NewsRadio 92.3 FM/1620 AM

Programming
- Format: News/talk
- Affiliations: Fox News Radio; Compass Media Networks; Premiere Networks; Salem Radio Network; Florida State Seminoles

Ownership
- Owner: ADX Communications of Escambia
- Sister stations: WEBY, WYCT

History
- First air date: December 17, 1949
- Former call signs: WPHG (1997–2002); WPNS (2002–2003); WBUB (2003–2004)
- Call sign meaning: "News Radio Pensacola"

Technical information
- Licensing authority: FCC
- Facility ID: 87034
- Class: B
- Power: 10,000 watts (day); 1,000 watts (night)
- Transmitter coordinates: 30°26′12.00″N 87°13′13.00″W
- Translators: 92.3 W222BR (Pensacola); 95.3 W237BE (Pensacola)

Links
- Public license information: Public file; LMS
- Website: newsradio923.com

WNRP (1620 AM) is a commercial radio station licensed to Gulf Breeze, Florida, United States, and serving the Pensacola metropolitan area. Owned by ADX Communications of Escambia, it carries a conservative talk format, with studios located at 7251 Plantation Road in Pensacola.

WNRP is relayed over two low-power FM translators: W222BR (92.3 FM) and W237BE (95.3 FM), both in Pensacola.

== History ==
=== 1580 AM ===
WNRP is the "expanded band" successor to a station that transferred from the original AM band.

The original station signed on December 12, 1949, as WATM, licensed to the Southland Broadcasting Company in Atmore, Alabama, and broadcasting with 250 watts of power on 1580 kHz. Southland was owned by local broadcaster Tom Miniard and his wife Ernestine. In 1956, it moved to 1590 kHz, and increased power to 1,000 watts. In 1959, the station upgraded to a 5,000-watts. This frequency, signal power, and ownership would be maintained unchanged for another two decades.

WATM was sold in the early 1980s, and changed its call letters to WSKR on May 5, 1986. The "Kicker" changed its call sign again on December 7, 1987, this time to WIZD, and began simulcasting its FM sister station. Months later, the station was sold to a religious group, the Maranatha Ministries Foundation, who changed the call letters to WGYJ, said to stand for "We Give You Jesus", on March 2, 1988.

=== Expanded Band assignment ===
On March 17, 1997, the Federal Communications Commission (FCC) announced that 88 stations had been given permission to move to newly available "Expanded Band" transmitting frequencies, from 1610 to 1700 kHz, with WGYJ authorized to move to 1620 kHz. The Maranatha Ministries Foundation, WGYJ's licensee, received its original construction permit for operation on 1620 kHz from the FCC on October 6, 1997. The new station, with Atmore, Alabama, as its community of license, was assigned the call letters WPHG on November 12, 1997. This call sign was said to stand for "We Proclaim His Glory".

The FCC provided that both the original station and its expanded band counterpart could optionally operate simultaneously for up to five years, after which owners would have to turn in one of the two licenses, depending on whether they preferred the new assignment or elected to remain on the original frequency. By February 1998, WPHG on 1620 kHz had begun broadcast operations while its license application was pending. With the expanded band station now on the air, WGYJ ceased operations on 1590 kHz, and its broadcast license was canceled on September 11, 1998.

In September 2000, Maranatha reached an agreement to sell WPHG to ADX Communications of Escambia. (WPHG-FM, the FM sister station, was sold to a different group at the same time.) The deal was approved by the FCC on November 16, 2000, and the transaction was consummated on March 5, 2001.

=== Move to Florida ===
In October 2000, with the sale pending, the permit holder petitioned the FCC to change the station's community of license to Gulf Breeze, Florida, so that it could better serve the more lucrative Pensacola, Florida, area. The FCC granted a construction permit for this move on July 10, 2002. With the move approved, the station applied to the FCC for new call letters and on August 19, 2002, was assigned WPNS to reflect the new Pensacola orientation. On March 21, 2003, the station switched its call sign to WBUB then again on July 27, 2004, to the WNRP.

After a move across state lines, an ownership change, several formats and callsign changes, and more than eight years, WNRP finally received its license to cover from the FCC on August 3, 2005. In late 2005, Dave and Mary Hoxeng debuted "Classic Country AM1620" with live personalities including Pensacola native and Nashville legend Larry Butler.

The station previously aired the games of the Pensacola Blue Wahoos, the Pensacola Pelicans baseball team and of the Pensacola Ice Pilots hockey team until the ECHL terminated the team's franchise after the 2007-2008 season.

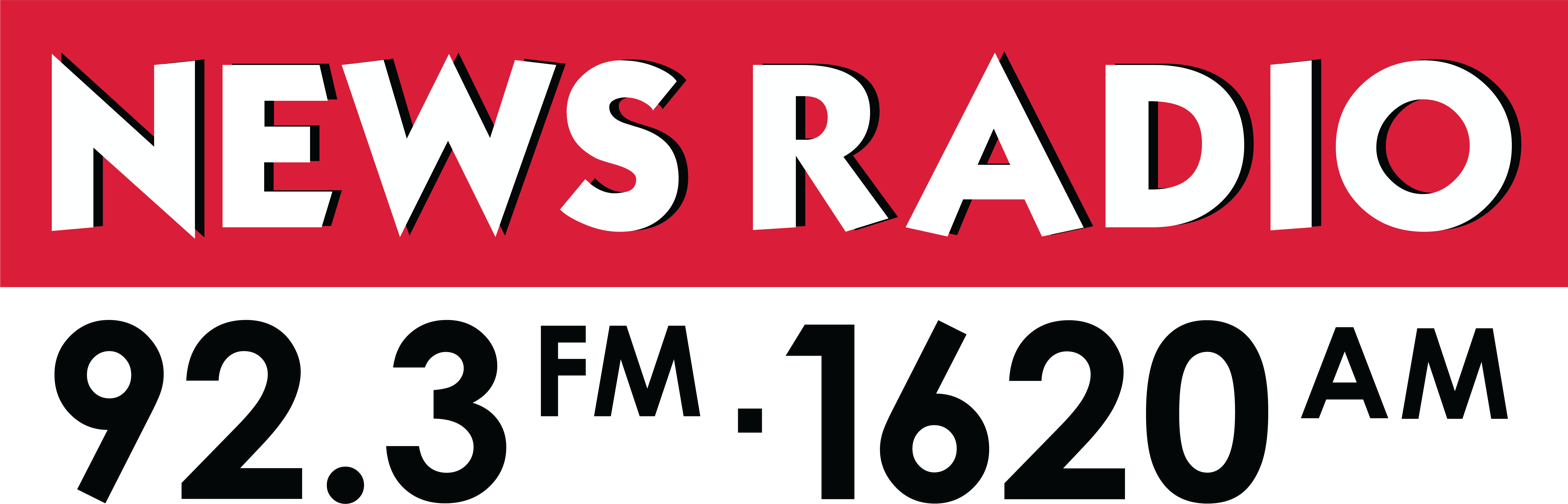
Previous logo

== Programming ==
Andrew McKay hosts WNRP's local morning show; nationally syndicated conservative talk shows form the balance of the station's schedule. The station also carries Florida State University football.
