= WMOB =

Mobile, Alabama; United States
- Frequency: 1360 kHz

Programming
- Format: Religious

Ownership
- Owner: Dave Minard; (UM Enterprise, LLC)
- Sister stations: WTOF

History
- First air date: January 25, 1961
- Last air date: November 22, 2020
- Former call signs: WLIQ (1961–1980); WPCY (1980–1981); WIXO (1981–1984)
- Call sign meaning: Mobile

Technical information
- Licensing authority: FCC
- Facility ID: 7740
- Class: B
- Power: 9,000 watts (day); 200 watts (night)
- Transmitter coordinates: 30°40′54.7″N 88°0′2″W
- Translator(s): 95.7 W239CW (Mobile)

Links
- Public license information: Public file; LMS

WMOB (1360 AM) was a radio station licensed to serve Mobile, Alabama, United States. The station, founded in 1961 as WLIQ, was owned by Dave Minard, through licensee UM Enterprise, LLC.

WMOB previously broadcast a religious format to the Mobile metropolitan area. WMOB's broadcast schedule consisted of a mix of local, brokered, and syndicated Christian ministry and inspirational programming.

== History ==
=== The WLIQ era ===
This station first signed on the air on January 25, 1961, as WLIQ, a 5,000-watt AM station owned by E. W. Jemison and Frank Conwell, a partnership doing business as Jemcon Broadcasting Company. The new station aired an easy listening format. On April 1, 1964, Jemcon Broadcasting Company, Inc., sold WLIQ to Hartzog Broadcasting, Inc., and the broadcast studios were moved to the historic Sheraton Battle House Hotel. The new owners transitioned the station's playlist to a middle of the road music format.

On July 26, 1971, WLIQ was acquired from Hartzog Broadcasting, Inc., by Southland of Alabama, Inc., and moved to new studios. During the 1970s, the station broadcast first a top 40 format, then later a country music format.

=== As WPCY ===
After nearly 20 years as WLIQ, the station applied and was assigned the call sign WPCY by the Federal Communications Commission (FCC) on June 30, 1980. A new format accompanied the new call sign as WPCY flipped to talk radio.

In February 1981, Southland of Alabama, Inc., agreed to sell this station to WPCY Broadcasting Company, Inc. The deal was approved by the FCC on February 26, 1981. The new owners put the station up for sale almost immediately and in June 1981 made a deal to sell WPCY to Beacon Broadcasting, Inc. The deal was approved by the FCC on October 14, 1981. As long-lived as the previous call sign had been, the new one would prove short-lived and a change was made to WIXO on November 30, 1981.

=== WMOB returns ===
In March 1984, Beacon Broadcasting, Inc., reached an agreement to sell this station to Buddy Tucker Enterprises, Inc. The deal was approved by the FCC on May 4, 1984, and the transaction was consummated on June 27, 1984. The new owners had the FCC change the station's call sign to the historic WMOB, one of the oldest callsigns in Alabama radio. (The original WMOB began broadcasting in 1939 but was shut down in 1949.) In February 1991, Buddy Tucker Enterprises, Inc., applied to the FCC to transfer the broadcast license for WMOB to Buddy Tucker Association, Inc. The transfer was approved by the FCC on February 20, 1991, and the transaction was consummated on April 9, 1991. The station ceased broadcasting on November 22, 2020, citing the owner's advanced age (over 90 years old) as the primary reason.

Effective November 1, 2022, Buddy Tucker Association sold WMOB, sister station WTOF, and translator W239CW to Dave Minard's UM Enterprise, LLC for $100.

On July 10, 2024, WMOB's license was cancelled by the FCC, as the station admitted it had not operated since August 2022.
