= WVOD =

Radio station in Manteo, North Carolina

Coordinates: 35.846°N 75.647°W

- Manteo, North Carolina; United States
- Broadcast area: Elizabeth City/Nags Head
- Frequency: 99.1 MHz
- Branding: 99.1 The Sound

Programming
- Format: Adult Album Alternative

Ownership
- Owner: Jam Media Solutions, LLC
- Sister stations: WZPR, WCMS-FM, WCXL

History
- First air date: 1986
- Call sign meaning: W Voice; Of; Dare County

Technical information
- Licensing authority: FCC
- Facility ID: 50525
- Class: C2
- ERP: 50,000 watts
- HAAT: 150 meters

Links
- Public license information: Public file; LMS
- Website: 991thesound.com

WVOD (99.1 FM) is a commercial radio station licensed to Manteo, North Carolina, serving the Outer Banks of North Carolina, which includes Kitty Hawk, Kill Devil Hills, and Nags Head. WVOD broadcasts at 50,000 watts at 99.1 FM, formatted as an AAA or Adult Album Alternative music station. The station is owned by Wright Sound, LLC.

== History ==
WVOD-FM began life on 99.3 FM as 99 3D, "Your Voices of Dare". Two Dare County businesswomen established the station under the company name "Orbit Communications", and with the license and engineering permits in place, the station began broadcasting on Easter weekend 1986. At the time the station went on the air, there were only three full-time salaried announcers on the company payroll. The station broadcast with 3 kW, moving to 99.1 in 1989 in order to upgrade to 50,000 watts. The original studio and offices were located in an old hardware store on the Manteo waterfront across the street from the Dare County courthouse.

Around 1996, WVOD became a full-fledged AAA station, and the station moniker became 'The Sound 99.1".

In 2006, Convergent Broadcasting LLC, which had bought the station in 2002, sold WVOD, WFMZ, WYND-FM and WZPR to CapSan Media LLC.

Hengooch, LLC bought WVOD, WYND-FM, and WZPR/WFMZ in 2010 for $200,000. Max Radio of the Carolinas operated WVOD, WZPR/WFMZ, WCMS-FM and WCXL as of 2013; WYND-FM was sold.

In 2018, Hengooch, LLC sold all of its North Carolina stations to Jam Media Solutions, LLC. Jam Media Solutions filed for Chapter 11 bankruptcy protection in October 2022 and in August 2023, the company's assets, including its radio stations, were transferred to a trustee for Chapter 7 liquidation.

In April 2024, Davis Media agreed to buy WVOD and six other stations but backed out of the deal shortly after.

On July 9, 2024, WVOD ceased operations.

In 2025, Wright Sound, LLC, a company led by former WVOD host Lisa Brickhouse Davis, agreed to purchase WVOD for $20,000. The sale received bankruptcy court approval in July 2025, and the station resumed operations on July 6, 2025.
