= WKHC =

Coordinates: 35.464°N 76.035°W

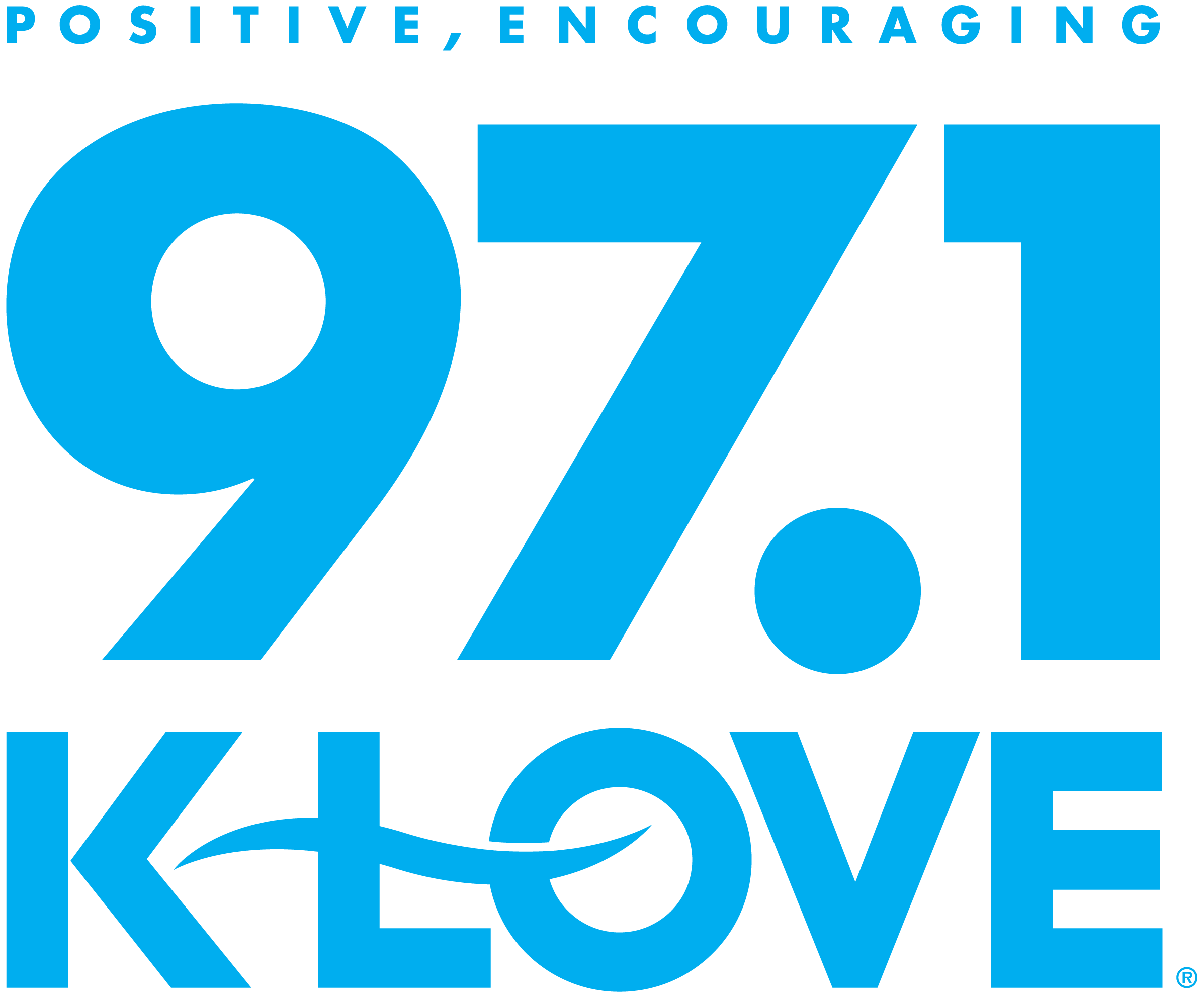
- Hatteras, North Carolina; United States
- Broadcast area: Elizabeth City-Nags Head
- Frequency: 97.1 MHz
- Branding: K-Love

Programming
- Format: Contemporary Christian
- Network: K-Love

Ownership
- Owner: Educational Media Foundation
- Sister stations: WZLV

History
- First air date: 1996
- Former call signs: WYND-FM (1989–2000); WNHW (2000–2003); WYND-FM (2003–2019)

Technical information
- Licensing authority: FCC
- Facility ID: 51417
- Class: C1
- ERP: 59,000 watts
- HAAT: 170 meters (560 ft)

Links
- Public license information: Public file; LMS
- Webcast: Listen live
- Website: www.klove.com

WKHC (97.1 FM) is a contemporary Christian radio station licensed to Hatteras, North Carolina serving the Outer Banks of North Carolina. The station is owned by Educational Media Foundation.

== History ==
WKHC started in 1989 as soft adult contemporary "The Wind 97.1", WYND-FM. In 2000, the station became country WNHW. In 2003, soft AC WYND-FM returned to 97.1. In 2006, Convergent Broadcasting LLC sold WYND-FM, WFMZ, WVOD and WZPR to CapSan Media LLC. On October 31, 2006, at noon, WYND-FM and WZPR both dropped soft AC for country, later branded as "Wilbur 92.3 & Orville 97.1".

In late 2002, Convergent had purchased these two stations from OBX Broadcasting. In April 2006, CapSan Media announced it had signed an Asset Purchase Agreement to purchase WZPR/WYND-FM along with sister stations WVOD and WFMZ from Convergent Broadcasting, LLC. On July 6, 2006, CapSan Media completed the purchase of all four stations.

On March 13, 2008, Capsan Media ended its country simulcast and flipped the 92.3 frequency to sports programming from ESPN Radio as "ESPN 92.3", while WYND-FM became Your Country 97.1.

On May 11, 2009, WYND-FM changed its format to sports as sister station WZPR was simulcasting WFMZ.

Hengooch, LLC bought WYND-FM, WVOD, and WZPR/WFMZ in 2010 for $200,000. Hengooch sold WYND-FM to EMF Broadcasting for $1 effective September 1, 2013. On September 1, 2013, WYND-FM changed their format to EMF's K-Love contemporary Christian format.

On February 5, 2019, the station changed its call sign to WKHC.
