= WCMS-FM =

- Hatteras, North Carolina; United States
- Broadcast area: Elizabeth City-Nags Head
- Frequency: 94.5 MHz
- Branding: Big 94.5

Programming
- Format: Country
- Affiliations: Motor Racing Network; Performance Racing Network

Ownership
- Owner: JAM Media Solutions LLC; (Jeffrey T. Testa, Trustee of JAM Media Solutions, LLC)
- Sister stations: WCXL; WZPR; WVOD

History
- First air date: May 1999 (as WWOC)
- Last air date: March 31, 2024
- Former call signs: WWOC (1999–2005)

Technical information
- Licensing authority: FCC
- Facility ID: 83211
- Class: C1
- ERP: 100,000 watts
- HAAT: 299 meters (981 ft)
- Transmitter coordinates: 35°29′7″N 76°0′1″W

Links
- Public license information: Public file; LMS

WCMS-FM (94.5 FM) was a radio station that broadcast a country music format. Licensed to Hatteras, North Carolina, United States, the station served the Elizabeth City-Nags Head area. WCMS used the name "Water Country" since it signed on in 1999. The original call sign was WWOC. The change to the WCMS call sign was granted on July 28, 2005. The station was owned by Max Media until 2018 after a sale from Ray-D-O Biz LLC.

The station was affiliated with the Motor Racing Network and the Performance Racing Network and carried live broadcasts of NASCAR Cup Series, NASCAR Xfinity Series, and NASCAR Camping World Truck Series races.

On March 31, 2024, WCMS ceased operations. Davis Media had planned to buy WCMS and other stations but the deal did not happen. WCMS-FM never returned to the air; its license was canceled on September 30, 2025.
