= KNTY =

Radio station in Sacramento, California

Coordinates: 38.566°N 121.481°W

- Sacramento, California; United States
- Broadcast area: Sacramento metropolitan area
- Frequency: 103.5 MHz
- Branding: Real Country 103.5

Programming
- Format: Country
- Affiliations: Real Country (Westwood One)

Ownership
- Owner: Entravision Communications; (Entravision Holdings, LLC)
- Sister stations: KXSE, KHHM, KRCX-FM, KCVR-FM

History
- First air date: September 12, 1996
- Former call signs: KRYR (1996–1997); KBMB (1997–2010); KHHM (2010–2021)
- Call sign meaning: "Country"

Technical information
- Licensing authority: FCC
- Facility ID: 20435
- Class: A
- ERP: 6,000 watts
- HAAT: 95 meters (312 ft)

Links
- Public license information: Public file; LMS
- Webcast: Listen live
- Website: realcountry1035.com

KNTY (103.5 FM, "Real Country 103.5") is a commercial radio station licensed to Sacramento, California, United States. The station broadcasts a gold-based country format and is owned by Entravision Communications, with studios located in North Sacramento and transmitter in Sacramento.

== History ==
=== Regional Mexican: 1996-1997 ===
On September 12, 1996, the station signed on with a Regional Mexican format as KRYR.

=== Urban: 1997-2010 ===
Then, in November 1997, the call sign changed to KBMB and switched to an Urban Contemporary format as 103.5 The Bomb, with the moniker "Better Mo' Better Music." The station was originally owned by Diamond Broadcasting, which, in turn, was controlled by license holder Paula Nelson, making KBMB Sacramento's second African American-owned and operated station behind KQBR-FM, which was launched four years earlier.

While the format debuted during the wave of current-driven hip-hop and R&B stations that sprang up nationally in the late 1990s, KBMB's music direction also consisted of soul, blues, funk, old school, gospel, reggae and pop titles (in rare occasions). Initially, the station was an affiliate of the satellite-fed "Touch" format from ABC Radio, a contract pursued and finally secured by the station's first operations director Thomas Turner. With the aid of promos, liners and drops produced by Bob Jones, the programming also served the largely ignored hip hop music community in Sacramento, as other stations such as KSFM, a leader in the market as a Rhythmic CHR, did not fully embrace hip hop music.

Reflecting the market's demographics (7% of the Sacramento radio market is African American), KBMB relied primarily on white females 18–34 for its ratings and commercial appeal. It was marketed as a Rhythmic CHR in 1998 as a way to target beyond the core audience and to attract more mainstream advertisers to the station, while still maintaining an unofficial urban format through its ABC Network affiliation and its own music selection. It was the home of the syndicated Doug Banks Morning Show, making KBMB one of few urban stations on the West Coast to carry a syndicated morning show. It also carried the Tom Joyner Morning Show for a short period upon the station's debut, but actually had both on for a while, after moving Banks to middays, mainly due to the latter personality airing in the afternoon drive in Central and Eastern time zones. When Banks opted to move his show to the mornings in 2000 opposite Tom Joyner (whose show was aimed at the urban adult contemporary audience), KBMB moved Banks to the 6 a.m. to 10 a.m. morning slot. Despite the tape delay, Banks had built a strong following among Sacramento listeners.

In its early days, KBMB once had personalities like former Program Directors Randy "Jayare" Johnson (who hosted locally oriented hip hop shows "the Basement" and "Ground Zero", and is now a member of the hip hop group Beataroundabush) and Ibrahim "E-Bro" Darden (now current program director at WQHT in New York), and Deshawn "D-Funk" Robertson, host of the highest rated afternoon drive time show in the station's history, "The Afternoon Flava Show" (Robertson is currently a professional stand-up comedian). From its inception, the station competed fiercely for ratings with heritage competitor KSFM for the very lucrative 18–34 female demographic. The station was committed to Sacramento community causes, as well as its inclusion of urban-leaning artists that traditionally were seldom heard on Sacramento radio. Though competing with an undersized signal which was originally 3 kW but later upped to 6 kW, the upstart station gave heritage KSFM (50 kW) a run for its money in the ratings. It even gained competition from KHYL in 2001 upon that station's format change to rhythmic oldies. In addition, in its early years, KBMB did grab a handful of listeners from KQBR, which shifted its format from smooth jazz to urban AC.

But in 2004, after years of litigation between the station's majority owner, Paula Nelson and Bustos Media, the station was forcibly sold to Entravision Communications, a predominantly Spanish language corporate entity. Johnson, Nelson, and all other managers were terminated, and the management team of the local Entravision cluster assumed the reins, despite the abysmal ratings at Entravision's existing properties. Almost immediately, the format was constrained in a failed attempt to compete with KSFM and pop rival KDND more directly. At the time this happened, KBMB was the last remaining Black-owned station on the air after KQBR was sold in 1998 to Entravision in a similar fate; that station is now KXSE.

After Entravision acquired KBMB, the new owners systematically went about disassembling the predominantly African American airstaff. The sentiments expressed by Entravision head of radio programming Jeff Lieberman were that the station was just too ethnic to compete in Sacramento, despite the station's history of ratings success with a predominantly African American staff and audience. A pronounced push to make the station more Hispanic-oriented began with the hiring of a nearly all Hispanic American air staff and the infusion of Spanish into the station's imaging, with the station gravitating to a rhythmic format. Entravision was not interested in retaining Doug Banks or Tom Joyner, so both shows were dropped for good in October 2004. Both syndicated personalities were replaced with a locally based morning show, but KBMB returned to a syndicated morning show with Big Boy's Neighborhood eventually, and added R-Dub's Sunday Night Slow Jams, along with its weeknight component. Only the Sunday morning gospel program "The Gospel Express" was retained in the format tweak.

=== Rhythmic Top 40: 2010-2019 ===
On January 11, 2010, after months of dismal ratings, KBMB dropped "The Bomb," rebranded as "Hot 103.5", and terminated Nikia Moore, the last of its daily African American air talents. With the rebrand, the station also shifted from a hip hop-focused approach to a broader contemporary hit direction that includes primarily pop crossovers that would not have been played in the past. In addition, Big Boy's Neighborhood, with mornings running jockless for a time while a more Latin-friendly morning show was sought.

On June 25, 2010, KBMB changed call letters to KHHM to match the "Hot 103.5" moniker. The move coincides with launch of the station's "103 Days of Summer" campaign. In February 2011, KHHM morphed to contemporary hit radio with a Rhythmic lean at first, but would move further into a more Mainstream direction with the addition of artists like The Script, Selena Gomez & The Scene, Coldplay, Christina Perri and Andy Grammer to its playlist, and in April 2011 was moved to Mediabase's Top 40/CHR panel. By September 2011, Nielsen BDS moved KHHM from the rhythmic contemporary panel to the Top 40/CHR panel, as it had become less dependent on Rhythmic hits; BDS still continued to list KHHM as a Top 40/CHR reporter, although Mediabase returned the station back to the Rhythmic panel in 2014. The format shift put the station in further competition with KDND, KZZO and KUDL, as well as KGBY until that station's flip in December 2011.

The station would make headlines on November 22, 2016, when, just two days after Kanye West cuts short, and after 30 minutes, abruptly ends, a concert performance at the Golden 1 Center (which would be his final stop on his Saint Pablo Tour, as he would cancel it before checking into a facility for medical treatment), KHHM's then-PD/airstaffer Justin "JayMarzz" Marshall announced that they were done with playing West's songs for good as its morning show made that statement by retaliating with cutting off his single "Fade" before Marshall slammed the rapper for criticizing fans, fellow musicians, and bias towards radio not supporting him.

On July 2, 2019, KHHM's on-air personalities were let go, with the station temporarily running jockless, as part of a planned return to a Spanish-language presentation. As of July 8, KHHM began running bilingual liners alongside the music.

=== Bilingual Rhythmic: 2019-2021 ===
On July 29, 2019, KHHM, along with sister station KCVR-FM in Modesto, changed their formats to a bilingual rhythmic CHR simulcast, branded as "Fuego 103.5". They are the second and third stations to flip to a bilingual Top 40 format in California that month, following KLLI in Los Angeles nearly two weeks prior. The new format features a music mix featuring Latin pop/rhythmic hits mixed with English-language pop hits. The move makes KHHM at least a partial competitor to Top 40/CHR rival KUDL again due to its lean towards Mainstream Top 40 currents. The first song played on "Fuego" was "Baila Baila Baila" by Ozuna. Whereas bilingual stations usually feature airstaffers who speak more than one language, KHHM's presentation is mostly English-language.

=== Classic country: 2021-present ===
On July 20, 2021, as part of a shuffle of formats, frequencies and call letters in Entravision's Sacramento cluster, KNTY (101.9 FM) dropped the "José" format and began simulcasting KHHM. On August 2, the "Fuego" format moved to 101.9 FM entirely, along with the KHHM call letters; the 103.5 frequency became classic country "Real Country 103.5" with the KNTY call sign.

== Ratings and signal coverage ==
Sacramento has always been a fierce market for Top 40 stations, which has seen more than one competitor claiming the crown. KBMB was, at the time, no exception, having beaten KSFM and KDND several times since its debut, and at most times ahead of rivals KSFM and KDND. But KSFM had dominated The Bomb in later years, mainly due to KSFM's more powerful signal and multi ethnic air staff and KBMB's small range (6 kW) and failed programming strategies. KBMB had also been beaten at times by KDND, a straightforward top 40 more in tune with 103.5's current direction.

Another reason for KNTY's Class A status is due to KHSL-FM in Chico, who also resides at the 103.5 frequency. As a result, KNTY's coverage is limited to mostly Sacramento County proper, although the primary signal basically covers the urban and more populated portion of the market. Since its shift from Rhythmic to Mainstream in 2011, KHHM's ratings had been low, making them hard to compete with KSFM and KDND (at the time it was on the air), although it improved somewhat slightly by being first and faster on current Pop hits and playing newer artists like One Direction and Capital Cities.

In March 2014, KHHM decided to dump the Top 40 format for Rhythmic Contemporary, and although they continued to play some pop songs, it had enough Hip Hop and R&B songs to compete with KSFM. This was probably done for ratings boost and to leave the clustered Top 40/CHR race, which they came in last every month since flipping formats in 2010, although their return had them facing off with Rhythmic AC rival KHYL as well. However, by August 2014, KHHM returned to BDS' Top 40/CHR panel, due to KHYL's shift to a short-lived Rhythmic direction and its return to a more Pop-skewing presentation (Mediabase had KHHM listed on its Rhythmic panel until its flip in July 2019).

== Programming ==
In 2005, long time 106 KMEL air personality Short-E and ex-KSFM Davey D both joined the Bomb Family. Although they enjoyed high ratings after their arrival to KBMB, Davey D's career with KBMB was cut short when he parted ways with the station in January 2008. Another change in the lineup took place in 2008 when Short-E, who was doing mornings with co-hosts Lady Stephanie and Famous, was moved to afternoons after the station placed Big Boy in the morning drive and his co-hosts were let go. On Sunday mornings, KHHM aired Gospel programming from 6 AM to 12 noon with Tommie Goss from the late 1998 until early 2010 when he left the station for KHYL.

In 2011, KHHM revamped its lineup, with the launch of the "Hot 1035 Hot Morning Mess" with JayMarzz and Roxy featuring the Breakfast Club mix with DJ Tosh, PD Pattie Moreno,"The Latin Diva," in mid-days featuring the Caliente Mix at noon with DJ SN1, Short E in the afternoons, Super Mike in evenings, and RayArea in weekends. This lineup was changed later on, with Short-E returning to mornings, Jay Marzz taking afternoons, Ray Styles succeeding Super Mike in evenings, and weekends are handled by Jillian. The daily mix shows continue to air intact with most of the mixes airing on Friday and Saturday nights. In November 2013, Short-E would leave KHHM to join KSFM as their new MD, followed by Moreno in January 2014. Jason “Sugar bear” Harris was holding down mornings from 2014 until its July 2019 flip.

Under “Fuego 103.5,” Megan Rage was the first airstaffer to be hired, taking afternoons, while most of the day parts and weekends are temporarily jockless.
