= WYCT =

Coordinates: 30.625°N 87.444°W

- Pensacola, Florida; United States
- Broadcast area: Pensacola, Florida; Mobile, Alabama
- Frequency: 98.7 MHz (HD Radio)
- Branding: Cat Country 98.7

Programming
- Format: Country
- Subchannels: HD1: WYCT analog; HD2: Playlist 94.5 (Adult contemporary); HD3: WNRP simulcast (News/Talk)

Ownership
- Owner: Mary Elizabeth Hoxeng Revocable Trust

History
- First air date: November 2003
- Call sign meaning: W Y CaT

Technical information
- Licensing authority: FCC
- Facility ID: 539
- Class: C1
- ERP: 100,000 watts
- HAAT: 299 meters (981 ft)
- Translator: HD2: 94.5 W233CM (Pensacola)

Links
- Public license information: Public file; LMS
- Webcast: Listen Live
- Website: catcountry987.com playlist945.com (HD2)

WYCT (98.7 FM) is a radio station known as "Cat Country 98.7". The main studio is located at 7251 Plantation Road in Pensacola, Florida, and station serves Pensacola and the Mobile, Alabama area with a country format. Its studios are in Pensacola and its transmitter is located in Foley, Alabama.

== History ==
This new 100,000-watt FM radio station was built from the ground up in 2002-2003. The station was started on 40 acres (160,000 m^{2}) of raw timberland where a new 942-foot (287 m) tower in Baldwin County and an associated "hurricane proof" blockhouse were built. WYCT was debuted as Christmas Radio 98.7 in November 2003, and switched to Country music on December 26, 2003. Longtime General Manager Mary Hoxeng purchased WYCT & W233CM in 2021.

According to many Solutions Broadcast Research and The Radio Index reports, WYCT has been the Pensacola radio station that delivers the largest Pensacola audience of adults aged 25 to 54.

WYCT won "Station of the Year" from the Academy of Country Music (ACM) in 2006, 2009, 2011, 2020, & 2023. Its morning show "The Cat Pak" won "ACM Personalities of the Year" in 2009 (Brent Lane and Dana Cervantes), 2019 (Brent Lane and Candy Cullerton), 2024 (Brent Lane and Mel McCrae). These awards were in the ACM Small Market division and were presented during the ACM Awards Show in Las Vegas or Frisco, Texas. The station won the "NAB Service to America" in 2008, 2019 & 2021. NAB recognized WYCT's service to its community with "Crystal Awards" in 2013, 2017 & 2019. The CMA awarded "Station of the Year" to WYCT in 2017, 2019 and 2024. CMA awarded "Personalities of the Year" to Cat Pak Morning Show (Brent Lane and Mel McCrae) in 2022. These are in the Small or Mid-Market categories.

== HD Radio ==
WYCT's HD Radio signal is multiplexed, with the HD3 channel carrying a simulcast of NewsRadio 92.3 / AM1620 WNRP. WYCT was the first radio station in Florida to broadcast in high-quality, HD RADIO. The HD4 channel carries a simulcast of ESPN PENSACOLA/1330 WEBY. WYCT uses a new, solid-state Rohde THR9 transmitter to broadcast its main 100,000 kW signal at 98.7 and the 4 high-quality HD Radio programs.

In August 2018, WYCT had added sports talk ESPN Pensacola on its HD2 subchannel, returning the network to the market for the first time since WBSR's flip to Christian music. The programming was simulcast on 94.5 W233CM in Pensacola.

ESPN PENSACOLA flipped to airing on WEBY/1330 and its 99.1 translator in August 2019.

WYCT-HD2 and W233CM/94.5 continued to simulcast WEBY until November 5, 2019, when they began stunting with Christmas music as Christmas Radio 94.5. The stunt continued on with a loop of "Baby Shark" from January 1 though 13, 2020, after which the stations launched a new adult contemporary format as Pensacola's PLAYLIST 94.5.
