= KHHM =

Radio station in Shingle Springs, California

Coordinates: 38.853°N 120.941°W

- Shingle Springs, California; United States
- Broadcast area: Sacramento metropolitan area
- Frequency: 101.9 MHz (HD Radio)
- Branding: Fuego 101.9

Programming
- Format: Bilingual Rhythmic CHR

Ownership
- Owner: Entravision Communications; (Entravision Holdings, LLC)
- Sister stations: KXSE, KNTY, KRCX-FM, KCVR-FM

History
- First air date: 1989 (as KLIQ)
- Former call signs: KLIQ (1988–1991); KFIA-FM (1991–1993); KSSJ (1993–1997); KRRE (1997–2000); KCCL-FM (2000–2006); KNTY (2006–2021)

Technical information
- Licensing authority: FCC
- Facility ID: 50302
- Class: B
- ERP: 47,000 watts
- HAAT: 154 meters (505 ft)

Links
- Public license information: Public file; LMS
- Webcast: Listen live
- Website: KHHM Online

KHHM (101.9 MHz) is a commercial FM radio station licensed to Shingle Springs, California, and serving the Sacramento metropolitan area. It is owned by Entravision Communications and airs a Bilingual Rhythmic CHR radio format branded as "Fuego 101.9". KHHM, along with sister stations KNTY, KRCX-FM, and KXSE have their radio studios and offices on Auburn Blvd in Sacramento.

KHHM has an effective radiated power (ERP) of 47,000 watts. The transmitter is in Coloma, California, about 30 miles northeast of Sacramento. Although KHHM is licensed for HD Radio, it has yet to sign on a HD2 or HD3 digital subchannel.

== History ==
=== Christian contemporary: 1989-1993 ===
In 1989, the station signed on with a Contemporary Christian music format. Its call sign was KLIQ, better known as Q-102. Its sister station was KFIA, owned by Olympic Broadcasting. In September 1991, it simulcast with KFIA except during drive times and on the weekend when it aired Christian music. Its call sign was changed to KFIA-FM.

=== Smooth jazz: 1993-1997 ===
In October 1993, the station switched to a smooth jazz format and the call sign changed to KSSJ. During this period, it was known as "101.9 The City."

Owner American Radio Systems sold 101.9 to EXCL Communications (now part of Entravision Communications) and the KSSJ intellectual property moved to Entercom's 94.7 FM in 1997.

=== Spanish: 1997-2000 ===
The station became KRRE and aired a Spanish format called "Radio Romantica."

=== Oldies: 2000-2006 ===
In 2000, KSSJ flipped to oldies (as Cool 101.9 under the KCCL-FM calls) after KHYL dropped the format for Rhythmic Oldies. The call sign was changed to KNTY on July 19, 2006.

=== Country: 2006-2019 ===
In 2006, the station changed formats to Country music as "101.9 The Wolf" with the call letters KNTY.

=== Regional Mexican: 2019-2020 ===
On July 2, 2019, staffers at KNTY and its Columbia-Modesto simulcast KCVR-FM, along with sister KHHM, informed listeners that they have been let go. Both stations were to flip formats on July 8, 2019, with KNTY to take a Regional Mexican presentation. The news ended a 13-year run with Country for "101.9 The Wolf," and a short 4-month run for "98.9 The Wolf."

On July 8, 2019, KNTY changed its format from country to a simulcast of Regional Mexican-formatted KRCX-FM 99.9 Marysville, branded as "La Tricolor".

=== Ranchera: 2020-2021 ===
On January 7, 2020, KNTY split from its simulcast with KRCX-FM and launched a Ranchera music format, branded as "José 101.9".

=== Fuego bilingual CHR: 2021-present ===
As part of a shuffle of formats, frequencies and call letters in Entravision's Sacramento cluster, on July 20, 2021, KNTY dropped the ranchera format and "José" branding, and began simulcasting the "Fuego" bilingual top 40 format, which was heard on KHHM (103.5 FM).

"Fuego" moved exclusively to 101.9 FM on August 2. At that time, the KHHM call letters moved to the 101.9 facility. Simultaneously, 103.5 relaunched as classic country-formatted KNTY.
