= KRCX-FM =

Radio station in Marysville, California

- Marysville, California; United States
- Broadcast area: Sacramento, California
- Frequency: 99.9 MHz (HD Radio)
- Branding: La Tricolor 99.9

Programming
- Format: Regional Mexican

Ownership
- Owner: Entravision Communications; (Entravision Holdings, LLC)
- Sister stations: KHHM, KNTY, KXSE, KCVR-FM

History
- First air date: 1948
- Former call signs: KMYC-FM (1948–1963); KRFD (1963–1986); KRFD-FM (1986–1996); KSXX-FM (1996–1997)

Technical information
- Licensing authority: FCC
- Facility ID: 56513
- Class: B
- ERP: 1,750 watts
- HAAT: 665 meters (2,182 ft)
- Transmitter coordinates: 39°12′20″N 121°49′10″W

Links
- Public license information: Public file; LMS
- Webcast: Listen live
- Website: radiolatricolor.com/sacramento

KRCX-FM (99.9 FM) is a radio station broadcasting a regional Mexican format. Licensed to Marysville, California, United States, it serves the Sacramento area. The station is currently owned by Entravision Holdings, LLC.

Although KRCX does have an HD Radio channel, it has yet to sign on an HD2 or HD3 subcarrier.

On March 10, 1994, KRCX took over KRFD, after their purchase of the station.
