= WCXL =

Radio station in Kill Devil Hills, North Carolina

- Kill Devil Hills, North Carolina; United States
- Broadcast area: Outer Banks
- Frequency: 104.1 MHz
- Branding: 104.1 FM WCXL

Programming
- Format: Conservative talk

Ownership
- Owner: East Carolina Radio, Inc
- Sister stations: WCMS-FM, WVOD, WFMZ (FM), WZPR

History
- First air date: 1993
- Former call signs: WXAI (1991–1992)

Technical information
- Licensing authority: FCC
- Facility ID: 55248
- Class: C1
- ERP: 100,000 watts
- HAAT: 296 meters (971 ft)
- Transmitter coordinates: 36°8′8″N 75°49′28″W

Links
- Public license information: Public file; LMS
- Webcast: Listen live
- Website: fm1041wcxl.com

WCXL (104.1 FM) is a 100,000-watt radio station broadcasting a conservative talk format. It is licensed to Kill Devil Hills, North Carolina, and serves the Outer Banks area. The station is owned by East Carolina Radio. Its studios are located in Nags Head, North Carolina, and transmitter facilities are located in Powells Point, North Carolina, near the Outer Banks. It dropped most of its satellite programming for live and local jocks in 2004.

The station has been showing up in Arbitron's ratings in the Hampton Roads market. It used to be owned by Ray-D-O Biz LLC. It was called WXAI from November 29, 1991 until was renamed on March 29, 1992. It had been known as "XL104." The 104.1 frequency had been tied up for eight years by three groups vying for it: East Carolina Radio, Coastal Broadcasting and Ray-D-O Biz. By the early 1990s, Ray-D-O Biz got the frequency.

On April 30, 2024, WCXL went silent and its hot adult contemporary format temporarily moved to WZPR 92.3 FM Nags Head. Davis Media planned to buy WCXL and other stations but the deal is off.

In January 2026, WCXL has returned to the air as a conservative talk station at a much lower power. East Carolina Radio, Inc. (ECRI) is in the process of purchasing them and has relocated their transmitter and tower location. ECRI is also in the process of purchasing WZPR.
