= KTSE-FM =

Radio station in Patterson, California

- Patterson, California; United States
- Broadcast area: Modesto, California
- Frequency: 97.1 MHz
- Branding: La Suavecita 97.1

Programming
- Language: Spanish
- Format: Adult hits

Ownership
- Owner: Entravision Communications; (Entravision Holdings, LLC)
- Sister stations: KCVR-FM, KMIX

History
- First air date: 1998
- Former call signs: KAAW (1993, CP); KZMS (1993–2001)

Technical information
- Licensing authority: FCC
- Facility ID: 29542
- Class: A
- ERP: 1,350 watts
- HAAT: 151 meters (495 ft)
- Transmitter coordinates: 37°29′34″N 121°13′29″W

Links
- Public license information: Public file; LMS
- Website: radiolasuavecita.com/stockton-modesto

KTSE-FM (97.1 FM) is a radio station broadcasting a Spanish adult hits format. Licensed to Patterson, California, United States, it serves the Modesto area. The station is currently owned by Entravision Communications.

== History ==
Prior to 2009, it was an adult hits station branded as Jose 97.1 until 2018 when the station flipped to the La Suavecita Network, and to simulcast on Sister station KCVR-FM 98.9 FM until the simulcast on 98.9 ended, and flipped to Country Music in 2019 and then to the Top 40 Fuego format to match its distant sister stations including KDVA in Phoenix AZ, KINT-FM in El Paso TX, KJMN in Denver CO, KLOB in Palm Springs CA, KNVO in the Rio Grande Valley, and KSEH in Brawley.
