= Sonny Fox (XM Radio) =

American DJ (1946–2020)

Sonny Fox (November 15, 1946 – August 14, 2020) was an American DJ born in Grand Rapids, Michigan, who hosted the uncensored comedy channel on XM Radio, now SiriusXM, until his death in 2020. He fronted a rock and roll group, "Jay Walker And The Jay Hawkers" in the mid- to late-1960s, playing venues across Michigan. Regional hits included "Love Have Mercy" and "Baby Blue," both on LyKe (sic) Til records.

== Biography ==
Jay Walker and the Jay Hawkers played at the graduation celebration for the 1966 Arthur Hill High School party at the Saginaw YMCA. In the late 1960s, Sonny Fox/Jay Walker obtained a job as a disc jockey on WKNX (1210 AM) in Saginaw, Michigan. Legend has it that he obtained his first on-air job when he was promoting a 'Jay Walker And The Jayhawkers' 45-record at various Michigan radio stations. WKNX hired him when he expressed interest in "...getting back into radio..." He meant that he had been in numerous stations promoting his group's records. The music director at WKNX assumed he was referring to actual on-air experience. WKNX was a 10,000-watt daytime radio station, meaning it was only able to broadcast during daylight hours. In the winter, hours were short. As summer approached, hours expanded, requiring the addition of another disc jockey. So Jay Walker (Sonny Fox) arrived on the WKNX airwaves. Between 1970 and 1972, Sonny was featured in the midday shift at CHUM in Toronto as Johnny Mitchell. In 1972, Fox took over the noon-to-3 PM shift at KHJ in Los Angeles. With the rise in popularity of FM radio, he left after one year and joined current XM Radio executive Lee Abrams to work as program director at both WYSP in Philadelphia and WKTU in New York, where he and Abrams developed the Superstars Album format.

After 4 years with WYSP, Sonny opted to change directions and moved to Miami to work in the morning radio there at Y100, WHYI. He created radio's first syndicated stand up comedy show, The Comedy Hour. The show featured back-to-back routines from the top comics of the day such as Bill Cosby, George Carlin, and Lenny Bruce. In 1999, Fox created "The Mp3 Comedy Network" a service that delivered comedy programming to morning radio programs across the country.

As he was launching the new service, Lee Abrams, then head of programming at XM Satellite Radio approached Fox to ask if he would be interested in reviving his comedy show programming skills in a new environment. Sonny took over as Program Director in November 2002, overseeing operations of both XM Comedy (Channel 150) and Laugh USA (Channel 96). Fox hosted "Funny In The Morning", a comedy morning show which airs on Sirius/XM's "Raw Dog" (XM Channel 99 and Sirius Channel 99). In addition to hosting the morning show, Fox also hosted and produced Stand-Up Sit-Down, a 60-minute interview program with comedians of the day. Sonny Fox could also be heard voicing programming elements on other XM and Sirius channels. Fox resided in the Florida Panhandle where he hosted his morning comedy show in New York remotely.

On November 15, Fox broadcast his last weekday morning show on Sirius XM. He continued with a weekly show on Saturday mornings.

== Death ==
His wife announced on Facebook that he had died of liver failure at their home in Dunnellon, Florida, on August 14, 2020. His obituary stated that, in addition to his radio work, he had continued to make music, and had shared stages with Three Dog Night, Little Richard, Toby Keith, and Chuck Berry.
