= Bal Kudtarkar =

Indian radio host (1921–2020)

- Born: August 21, 1921
- Died: 7 February 2020 (aged 98)
- Occupation: Radio personality
- Known for: "Prapanch" and "Punha Prapanch"
- Children: 2

Bal Kudtarkar (21 August 1921 – 7 February 2020) was a radio personality from All India Radio, Mumbai. He was the Marathi voice that was most recognized on Mumbai Radio and was the voice enjoyed by millions from the 1940s through 1980s. His most famous radio creation was a show called "Prapanch" and its revived version "Punha Prapanch", a 15-minute radio show with three characters (Pant, Meena and Tekade) that covered local events and the toils of daily life, in a humorous way. The three characters were Pant (Bal Kudtarkar), Meena (late Neelam Prabhu) and Tekade (late Prabhakar Joshi).

Kudtarker died in February 2020 at a private hospital. His body was cremated on 6 February 2020.

== Career ==
Kudtarkar joined All India Radio in 1940 as a drama artist. He remained with the organisation for nearly four decades and retired on 30 June 1979 as Drama Producer (Marathi).
