= WOBR-FM =

- Wanchese, North Carolina; United States
- Broadcast area: Outer Banks
- Frequency: 95.3 MHz
- Branding: Pirate 95.3

Programming
- Format: Mainstream rock
- Affiliations: Premiere Networks; United Stations Radio Networks

Ownership
- Owner: East Carolina Radio, Inc.
- Sister stations: WOBX; WOBX-FM; WRSF

History
- First air date: 1973
- Call sign meaning: "Where the Outer Banks Rocks"

Technical information
- Licensing authority: FCC
- Facility ID: 73366
- Class: C3
- ERP: 25,000 watts
- HAAT: 90 meters (300 ft)
- Transmitter coordinates: 35°51′54.6″N 75°38′58.6″W

Links
- Public license information: Public file; LMS
- Webcast: Listen live
- Website: pirate953.com

WOBR-FM (95.3 FM, "Pirate 95.3") is a radio station broadcasting a mainstream rock format. Licensed to Wanchese, North Carolina, United States, it serves the Outer Banks. The station is owned by East Carolina Radio, Inc.

== History ==
The station was the Outer Banks' first FM station, signing on in 1973. At first the station simulcasted its adult contemporary AM sister station WOBR during the day and broadcast easy listening music after the AM signed off at night. In the early 1980s, the station became a full-time beautiful music station, but later evolved into adult contemporary, and finally an adult album alternative (AAA) format by end of the 1980s as "Beach 95FM". In the early 1990s East Carolina Radio brought the station, and the AAA format eventually developed into an alternative rock format as "The Wave". In 1997, the station adjusted the format to modern adult contemporary. By the end of the 1990s it had become classic rock as "The Rock".

On December 5, 2012, at 10 a.m. WOBR relaunched as "Pirate 95.3 - Rock Without Rules" the next day, playing a mix of classic rock and active rock.
