= WERX-FM =

Coordinates: 35.918°N 76.346°W

- Columbia, North Carolina; United States
- Frequency: 102.5 MHz
- Branding: 102.5 The Shark

Programming
- Format: Classic hits

Ownership
- Owner: Lawrence Loesch & Margaret Loesch

History
- First air date: 1982 (as WZBO)
- Former call signs: WZBO (1982–1983); WZBO-FM (1983–1992)

Technical information
- Licensing authority: FCC
- Facility ID: 36764
- Class: C1
- ERP: 64,000 watts
- HAAT: 210 meters

Links
- Public license information: Public file; LMS
- Webcast: Listen Live
- Website: 1025theshark.com

WERX-FM (102.5 FM) is a radio station broadcasting a classic hits format. Licensed to Columbia, North Carolina, US, it serves the Outer Banks and Hampton Roads areas. The station is currently owned by Lawrence Loesch & Margaret Loesch.

The station had originally been WZBO, running an adult contemporary format out of their Edenton, North Carolina studio. In 1990, The Loesch family purchased the station and was able to raise the station's power from 6 kW to 64 kW and relocated its tower to Columbia, North Carolina and its studios to Nags Head, North Carolina and went modern rock as WERX. In the mid-1990s the station went to an oldies format, and finally to its current classic hits format.
