= KCVR-FM =

- Columbia, California; United States
- Broadcast area: Modesto, California
- Frequency: 98.9 MHz (HD Radio)
- Branding: Fuego 98.9

Programming
- Language: Spanish
- Format: Bilingual Rhythmic CHR

Ownership
- Owner: Entravision Communications; (Entravision Holdings, LLC)
- Sister stations: KTSE

History
- First air date: August 1, 1995
- Former call signs: KAGF (1993–1994); KTDO (1994–2000); KTDZ (2000–2001)

Technical information
- Licensing authority: FCC
- Facility ID: 12063
- Class: A
- ERP: 6,000 watts
- HAAT: 100 meters (330 ft)
- Transmitter coordinates: 38°2′15″N 120°22′5″W

Links
- Public license information: Public file; LMS
- Webcast: Listen live
- Website: fuegofm.com/stockton-modesto

KCVR-FM (98.9 FM) is a radio station licensed to Columbia, California, United States, and broadcasting to the Central Valley cities of Modesto and Stockton, in addition to the Sierra Nevada foothills surrounding Columbia, where the transmitter site is located. The station is owned by Entravision Communications.

== History ==
=== Early years ===
In the early 1990s, a construction permit was issued for a new station at 98.9 FM, to be licensed to cover the Sierra Nevada town of Columbia. The station was assigned the call letters KAGF on December 17, 1993, only to change to KTDO on September 30, 1994. The station began broadcasting August 1, 1995, with a format mostly consisting of non–Regional Mexican Spanish-language music. In 1996, Silverado Broadcasting bought KTDO and KLOC (920 AM) from Clock Broadcasting; Silverado specialized in Spanish-language formats. A year later, the station was one of five Silverado outlets purchased by Z-Spanish Radio. The station's call sign was changed to KTDZ on March 10, 2000.

=== Acquisition by Entravision ===
Entravision Communications agreed to buy Z-Spanish in 2000. In late 2001, the station was acquired by Entravision Communications, then a startup company from Santa Monica. After the sale closed, KTDZ flipped to a rock en español format branded as Super Estrella. On December 17, 2001, the station's call sign became the current KCVR-FM.

Logo as Super Estrella

=== Adoption of KTSE simulcast ===
Logo under KTSE-FM simulcast and La Suavecita branding

On January 8, 2018, KCVR-FM adopted a simulcast of KTSE-FM, and its Spanish-language Soft AC format, branded as La Suavecita This simulcast would only last 14 months.

=== Country era ===
Logo as 98.9 The Wolf

In March 2019, KCVR-FM broke its simulcast with KTSE and flipped to Country, branded as "98.9 The Wolf", adopting the branding found on Shingle Springs station KNTY. KCVR-FM would use KNTY's airstaff during this time to voicetrack in key dayparts, while still airing local advertisements and weather reports. This move transitioned KCVR-FM to an English-language outlet for the first time since Entravision's 2001 acquisition of the station.

=== Adoption of KHHM simulcast ===
Unfortunately, on July 2, 2019, staffers at KCVR, concurrent with KNTY, and Sacramento rhythmic station KHHM, informed listeners via Instagram that they have been let go as all three stations will flip formats. On July 8, 2019, KNTY flipped to Regional Mexican as a simulcast with KRCX in Marysville, while KCVR and KHHM remained jockless ahead of their impending format flips to be determined. The move ended a 13 year run of the Wolf brand, and short four-month run for KCVR-FM as "98.9 The Wolf", as KCVR-FM would adopt a full time simulcast of KHHM and its Fuego FM branding and Rhythmic CHR format, with a bilingual presentation on July 29, 2019. The move makes KCVR-FM a competitor to Rhythmic CHR station KWIN. Despite the bilingual shift in music, all programs and sonic imaging are still presented in English.
