= WEBY =

Radio station in Milton, Florida

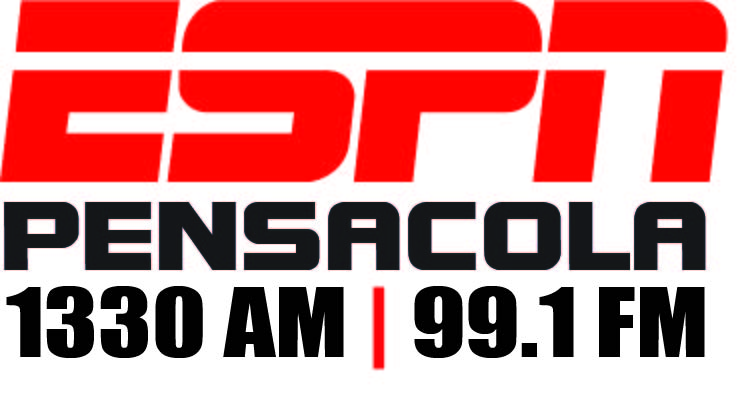
- Milton, Florida; United States
- Broadcast area: Pensacola area
- Frequency: 1330 kHz
- Branding: ESPN Pensacola

Programming
- Format: Sports
- Affiliations: ESPN Radio

Ownership
- Owner: David Hoxeng; (ADX Communications of Milton, LLC)
- Sister stations: WYCT WNRP

History
- First air date: 1982 (as WSWL)
- Former call signs: WSWL (1982–1983); WAVX (1983–1985)

Technical information
- Licensing authority: FCC
- Facility ID: 64
- Class: D
- Power: 25,000 watts day 79 watts night
- Transmitter coordinates: 30°31′5″N 87°4′56″W (day); 30°37′12″N 87°1′21″W (night)
- Translator: 99.1 W256DL (Milton)

Links
- Public license information: Public file; LMS
- Webcast: Listen live
- Website: espnpensacola.com

WEBY (1330 AM) is a radio station broadcasting a sports format. Licensed to Milton, Florida, United States, the station serves the Pensacola area. The station is currently owned by David Hoxeng, through licensee ADX Communications of Milton, LLC, and features programming from ESPN Radio.

WEBY was initially established in 1954. Its license was revoked in 1972 after the station was challenged for violations of the Fairness Doctrine. Several applicants fought for the frequency; a new station began operating in the early 1980s as WSWL and WAVX and was then bought by the son of the owner of the previous WEBY license, which restored the WEBY call letters.

== First WEBY license ==
=== Early years ===
WEBY began broadcasting on September 1, 1954. The independent outlet was owned by Clayton W. Mapoles, a former newspaper publisher in Milton and Crestview, and initially broadcast with 1,000 watts. In 1958, the Federal Communications Commission approved an increase in the station's power to 5,000 watts.

Among the station's most controversial figures was on-air personality Ben Henry Pooley, who was known for his caustic commentaries against county officials using epithets such as "Little Sir Echo", "The Bald Eagle from Pollard" and "Super Octane — The Gas-Guzzlin' Commissioner From Harold". In May 1959, a grand jury cleared Pooley of charges that he had been speeding in his vehicle and was found with moonshine whiskey in the car, which station owner Mapoles decried as intimidation attempts. Mapoles noted that he had received three threats to blow up the station unless it ceased criticizing the Santa Rosa County sheriff, Bart D. Broxson, and removed Pooley from the air. Six months later, Santa Rosa County commissioner Clifford Wilson sued the station for slander and demanded $50,000 in damages, claiming that Pooley had broadcast false accusations that Wilson used county gasoline in his private vehicles.

Six officials, including Wilson, Broxson, two other Santa Rosa County commissioners and two state legislators, then appealed to the Federal Communications Commission for the revocation of WEBY's license and that of Mapoles's other radio station, WBLO in Evergreen, Alabama. The FCC refused, as the WEBY license was not up for renewal at the time. Meanwhile, a thief stole 4,000 records from the station in November 1960; owner Mapoles offered rewards for the records and for clothes stolen from a women's apparel store he owned. A man was arrested in both thefts and 30 other burglaries in May 1961.

In 1961, while Wilson's slander suit was thrown out by a judge, Wilson challenged WEBY's license renewal. The FCC renewed the license in 1962, dismissing the petitions against it; the decision on the fairness doctrine was so significant that it was later referred to as the "Mapoles decision". The Mapoles operation in Milton expanded two years later with the April 1964 launch of WXBM-FM 102.3 (relocated to 102.7 MHz in 1974), which was owned by Clayton's son Byrd.

=== Revocation ===
On July 19, 1967, the FCC voted to designate the license renewal of WEBY for hearing, after the commission received complaints against the Milton Broadcasting Company, licensee of WEBY, for potential violations of the fairness doctrine relating to editorials the station aired on April 22, 1966. The chief plaintiff was John C. Boles of Bagdad, who said the WEBY editorials attacked him while he was a candidate for the Florida State Senate, but the station did not give him equal time to respond. The FCC also sought to establish whether Mapoles and other station officials made misrepresentations.

Mapoles attempted to sell the station to Lawrence Hankins "Hank" Locklin, a country music star and member of Grand Ole Opry who was from nearby McClellan, FL, and terminate the renewal proceeding in early 1968; the FCC denied the request and also threw out an application by a third party to build a new station on WEBY's frequency. Alleging poor health, Mapoles reiterated at a 1969 hearing in Pensacola his desire to sell the station to Locklin; however, the commission contended he only attached partial records in support of his claim. FCC hearing examiner Herbert Sharfman, in an initial decision published at the end of June 1970, recommended a one-year short-term renewal for WEBY's license, stating that Mapoles's misrepresentations did not justify more severe action.

The FCC Broadcast Bureau took exception to the initial decision and appealed; oral arguments were held before the FCC in January 1972. In May, the commission denied a renewal for WEBY, finding Sharfman's judgment "colored" and stating that he placed the burden of proof on the Broadcast Bureau and not on Mapoles, who displayed "an unpardonable lack of candor" in supplying a purported copy of the editorial that was milder than that which actually aired and in inconsistencies in the presented medical record. Mapoles immediately appealed the order, allowing the station to continue broadcasting beyond the July 3 date set for it to cease operations. A motion to stay the effective date of the order, however, was denied on March 13, 1973, and WEBY ceased operations on the evening of March 30, with much of its programming moving to WXBM-FM.

After 10 years at WEBY, Pooley left the station. Over the years, he survived four assassination attempts. He returned to the air at WECM (1490 AM) in the 1990s before his death in 2003.

== Current license ==
=== Frequency fight and reemergence as WSWL ===
After canceling the WEBY license and deleting the call letters, the FCC accepted applications for WEBY's former facilities in April. Within a month of the station closing, the commission received two applications, from Jimmie H. Howell, a Santa Rosa County commissioner and radio personality, and Byrd Mapoles. In his application, Byrd Mapoles submitted 10,000 signatures from local residents. By the filing deadline, two more groups had joined the contest: Aaron J. Wells and Radio Santa Rosa, Inc.

In 1976, the FCC opted to award the construction permit to Wells, a surveyor from Holley and pastor at the Springhill Assembly of God Church. The Wells permit took the call letters WFGS, though it obtained a series of extensions and remained unbuilt for years. After another sale, the new station finally signed on in September 1982 as WSWL, owned by Bright Horizon Productions. It aired a talk format along with audio from the then-new CNN Headline News cable network.

=== WAVX, "The Wave" ===
Bright Horizon—owned by the Switzer and Bott families—operated the station for less than a year before selling it to Wave Express Broadcasting Company in exchange for $31,250 in debt; Wave Express owned two stations in Ohio. In advance of the deal, WSWL dropped its talk format for urban contemporary as "The Wave"; this put it in competition with Pensacola's heritage station for black audiences, WBOP (980 AM). The call letters were changed to WAVX on November 18, 1983.

=== The return of WEBY ===
Wave Express filed on October 2, 1984, to sell WAVX to #1 Radio, owned by H. Byrd Mapoles, for $100,000; by this time, Mapoles no longer owned WXBM-FM. On Labor Day 1985, 1330 AM returned to the WEBY call letters used by the first license; the relaunched station aired a nostalgia format and broadcast in AM stereo.

After Byrd Mapoles was elected Santa Rosa County commissioner in 1990, the station began airing county meetings. Mapoles's daily program "This Side of the Fence" was known for its right-wing viewpoints.

=== News/talk format ===
On June 5, 2000, WEBY flipped to a news/talk format as Mapoles began the process of selling the station to Mike Bates and Jeff Weeks. The station debuted a number of new local shows and ceased airing county meetings. However, while Bates leased the station, Mapoles continued to own WEBY in 2001.

In 2002, Mapoles finally sold the license to Bates, doing business as Spinnaker License Corporation. In 2004, it aired a series of local programs, including in morning and afternoon drive, supplemented by syndicated shows hosted by Neal Boortz, Clark Howard and Ken Hamblin. Additionally, WEBY upgraded its daytime power to 25,000 watts in 2006.

=== ESPN Pensacola ===
Spinnaker sold the station to ADX Communications, owners of WYCT and WNRP.

On August 19, 2019, WEBY flipped from news/talk to sports talk as an affiliate of ESPN Radio, re-located from W233CY 94.5 Milton and WYCT-HD2. The station primarily carries its national lineup and The Paul Finebaum Show, alongside a local noon program hosted by University of Florida alumnus and retired football coach Kay Stephenson; it also airs Pensacola Blue Wahoos minor league baseball and University of West Florida college football games.
