= WTOF =

- Bay Minette, Alabama; United States
- Frequency: 1110 kHz
- Branding: Tower of Faith

Programming
- Format: Christian

Ownership
- Owner: Dave Minard; (UM Enterprise, LLC)

History
- First air date: April 16, 1957
- Former call signs: WBCA (1957–2006)
- Call sign meaning: "Tower of Faith"

Technical information
- Licensing authority: FCC
- Facility ID: 24653
- Class: D
- Power: 6,800 watts (day); 2,200 watts (critical hours)
- Transmitter coordinates: 30°49′37″N 87°51′50″W

Links
- Public license information: Public file; LMS

WTOF (1110 AM, "Tower of Faith") is a commercial radio station licensed to serve Bay Minette, Alabama. The station is owned by Dave Minard, through licensee UM Enterprise, LLC. It previously aired a Christian radio format including syndicated Christian talk and Christian ministry plus Southern Gospel music.

== History ==
=== The beginning ===
This station first began licensed broadcasting on April 16, 1957, under the ownership of the Southwest Alabama Broadcasting Company. The 1,000-watt daytime-only station broadcast on a frequency of 1150 kHz using the call sign WBCA. Faulkner Radio Inc. acquired the station in December 1958. The WBCA call sign was said to stand for "Wonderful Baldwin County Alabama".

In 1967, the Federal Communications Commission granted the station a construction permit to change frequencies to the current 1110 kHz and increase broadcast power to 10,000 watts.

In March 1986, after nearly three decades of continuous ownership, Faulkner Radio Inc., reached an agreement to transfer the broadcast license for WBCA to Faulkner University. The deal was approved by the FCC on April 2, 1986, and the transaction was consummated on August 4, 1986. In March 1987, Faulkner University agreed to transfer the broadcast license for this station to Faulkner-Phillips Media, Inc. The deal was approved by the FCC on April 15, 1987, and the transaction was consummated on May 22, 1987.

=== The 1990s ===
In May 1990, Faulkner-Phillips Media, Inc., contracted to sell this station to Lake Area Radio, Inc. The deal was approved by the FCC on May 10, 1990, and the transaction was consummated on May 22, 1990. In August 1990, Lake Area Radio, Inc., reached an agreement to sell this station to Gordon F. Earls Radio, Inc. The deal was approved by the FCC on September 27, 1990, and the transaction was consummated on October 5, 1990.

In October 1994, Gordon F. Earls Radio, Inc., reached an agreement to sell this station to Gaston Monroe. The deal was approved by the FCC on December 5, 1994, and the transaction was consummated on January 6, 1995.

In April 1998, Gaston Monroe agreed to sell this station to Southern Media Communications, Inc., for a reported sale price of $91,200. The deal was approved by the FCC on June 1, 1998, and the transaction was consummated on July 22, 1998.

In March 2006, Southern Media Communications, Inc., made a deal to sell this station to Gulf Coast Broadcasting, Inc., as part of a three-station deal valued at $550,001. The deal was approved by the FCC on October 18, 2006, but the transaction was never consummated and the stations stayed with Southern Media Communications.

=== The present ===
In November 2006, Southern Media Communications, Inc., then agreed to sell this station to Buddy Tucker Association, Inc., for a reported sale price of $300,000. The deal was approved by the FCC on January 6, 2007, and the transaction was consummated on January 11, 2007.

In anticipation of the sale, the station was assigned the current WTOF call sign by the FCC on November 28, 2006. The WTOF call sign was previously used by a similarly formatted religious radio station in Canton, Ohio. That station also used the "Tower of Faith" branding. The station ceased broadcasting at sunset on November 22, 2020, as its owner is over 90 years old and is retiring.

Effective November 1, 2022, Buddy Tucker Association sold WTOF, sister station WMOB, and translator W239CW to Dave Minard's UM Enterprise, LLC for $100.
