= Stereo 974 =

Defunct radio station in Melbourne, Victoria

Stereo 974 (3WRB)
- Station logo at close, January 2020

Western suburbs of Melbourne, Victoria; Australia
- Broadcast area: Melbourne Western Suburbs RA1
- Frequency: 97.4 MHz

Programming
- Language: Multilingual
- Format: Community radio

Ownership
- Owner: Western Radio Broadcasters Ltd.

History
- First air date: 1978
- Last air date: 16 January 2020
- Call sign meaning: Western Radio Broadcasters

Technical information
- Licensing authority: ACMA
- ERP: 200 W

Stereo 974 (call sign: 3WRB) was an Australian community radio station broadcasting to the western suburbs of Melbourne, Victoria. First broadcast in 1978 from studios in Braybrook, at the time of closure the station was based in Brooklyn and broadcast a mix of country music and programming in languages other than English (LOTE).

== History ==
Stereo 974 commenced broadcasting as 3WRB, initially covering a broader area; encompassing the Werribee and Melton areas now served by WYN FM and 979fm respectively. Previous committee members include the then-Member for Lalor, Barry Jones MP, who served as chairman between 1980 and 1982.

In December 1990, the Australian Broadcasting Tribunal held a hearing to determine whether additional conditions should be placed on the 3WRB licence, or to suspend the station's licence entirely. Consequently, Western Radio Broadcasters was restructured from a corporation structure to a membership committee, and in 1992 the Tribunal ruled 3WRB would retain its licence, albeit with extra conditions including amendments to the licensee's constitution.

In 1994, Southern Cross Broadcasting, owners of commercial radio stations 3AW and 3MP, sought a Federal Court injunction against 3WRB and 3INR from broadcasting the 1994 AFL season. 3WRB had intended to broadcast games featuring Footscray, as it did in the 1993 season. The injunction was granted, however the Australian Broadcasting Authority (ABA) later ruled that both stations were not in breach of the Broadcasting Services Act 1992. In both cases, the broadcast of Australian Football League matches did not constitute a profit-making enterprise, and thus "do[es] not change the nature of the service from community to commercial."

Western Radio Broadcasters was also found to have breached the Broadcasting Services Act and the Community Broadcasting Association of Australia (CBAA) Code of Practice on several occasions. In February 1999, the ABA found the station had breached clauses 6.3 and 6.4 of the CBAA code for its handling of a dispute between a presenter and the committee of management. The station was also found in breach of its community radio licence for broadcasting advertisements during episodes of its Vietnamese language program in April and May 2000 and July 2001.

In 1991, following the Coode Island fire, the station established an emergency warning system. In 2010, the station signed a memorandum of understanding and was certified as an official emergency broadcaster in its Melbourne West licence area.

=== Closure ===
On 16 January 2020 the station ceased broadcasting. Management declined to comment to the Star Weekly, with the newspaper reporting that a lack of funding may have made the station financially nonviable. Trade publication Radioinfo was told a general meeting of the station's members had been informed the station's site was to be redeveloped, and that the organisation "couldn't survive the costs of a relocation".

== Programming (at time of closure) ==
At the time of closure, programming was presented by volunteer presenters. English language programs included country music shows and the long-running Let It Be Beatles, which had aired on the station since 1992 and is now running on WYN-FM. LOTE programming was produced in languages including Vietnamese, Spanish, Maltese, Sudanese Arabic, Sinhalese and Ethiopian. Funding for these programs was made available by the Community Broadcasting Foundation.

== Awards ==
Stereo 974 had won several awards from the Southern Community Media Association, which incorporates community broadcasters from regional and suburban Australia.

Year	Nominee / work	Award	Result
2009	Stereo 974	Best In House Production of a Sweeper	Won
2009	Stereo 974	Best In House Production of a Local Music Program	Won
2009	Stereo 974	Best In House Production of a Station ID	Nominated
2009	Stereo 974	Best In House Production of a Sponsorship Announcement	Nominated
2013	Stereo 974	Best In House Production of a Sweeper or Station ID	Won
2013	Stereo 974	Best In House Production of a Community Service Announcement	Won
2013	Bob Taylor	Best Program – Music	Won
2013	Bob Taylor	Best Interview	Nominated
2013	Dave Dawson	Best Program – Non Music	Nominated
2013	Stereo 974	Best In House Production of a Show Promo	Nominated
2013	Stereo 974	Best Local News	Nominated
2015	Stereo 974	Best In House Production of a Show Promo	Won
