= WZPR =

Coordinates: 35.847°N 75.622°W

- Nags Head, North Carolina; United States
- Broadcast area: Elizabeth City/Nags Head
- Frequency: 92.3 MHz
- Branding: The Score

Programming
- Format: Sports

Ownership
- Owner: East Carolina Radio, Inc.

History
- First air date: 1990 (as WNHW at 92.5)
- Former call signs: WPIR (1989–1990, CP); WNHW (1990–2000); WYND-FM (2000–2003)
- Former frequencies: 92.5 MHz (1990–2000)

Technical information
- Licensing authority: FCC
- Facility ID: 12158
- Class: C3
- ERP: 10,000 watts
- HAAT: 117 meters (384 ft)

Links
- Public license information: Public file; LMS
- Webcast: Listen live

WZPR (92.3 FM) is a radio station licensed to Nags Head, North Carolina, serving the Outer Banks of North Carolina. The station is owned by East Carolina Radio, Inc.

The original WZPR was a country station in Meadville, Pennsylvania at 100.3 FM. That station dropped the call sign when it became known as "Froggy" in early 2000.

== History ==
WZPR began as a country music station in the 1990s as WNHW, at 92.5 FM. In 2000, the station became soft adult contemporary WYND "The Wind 92.3".

In late 2002, Convergent Broadcasting, LLC purchased these two stations from OBX Broadcasting. Shortly after in early 2003, WYND moved back to 97.1 and 92.3 then became "Power 92.3" WZPR, which broadcast contemporary Top 40 hit songs.

In April 2006, CapSan Media announced it had signed an Asset Purchase Agreement to purchase WZPR along with sister stations WYND-FM, WVOD, and WFMZ from Convergent Broadcasting, LLC. On July 6, 2006, CapSan Media completed the purchase of all four stations.

Subsequently on October 25, 2006, Power 92.3 was turned off when the station dropped its contemporary hit radio format and started simulcasting sister station WYND-FM, known as "Wilbur 92.3" and "Orville 97.1".

On March 13, 2008, Capsan Media changed the 92.3 frequency to sports as "ESPN 92.3."

On May 14, 2009, WZPR started simulcasting sister station Classic Hits 104.9 WFMZ.

Hengooch, LLC bought WFMZ, WZPR, WYND-FM and WVOD in 2010 for $200,000.

On December 5, 2012, due to WOBR-FM relaunching as "The Pirate", WFMZ and WZPR tweaked their format to classic rock.

Max Radio of the Carolinas operates WZPR/WFMZ, WCMS-FM and WCXL as of 2013; WYND-FM was sold.

On August 17, 2018, WFMZ ended its simulcast with 92.3. WZPR was rebranded as "Classic Rock 92.3".

On July 13, 2020, WZPR changed its format from classic rock to news/talk, branded as "News Talk 92.3".

Ten months later, on May 24, 2021, WZPR dumped its conservative talk format and began stunting with blocks of different programming, including all-Elvis and all-Frank Sinatra, leading up to a change on May 28 at Noon. On the morning of the 28th, the stunting switched to the opening riffs of We Will Rock You by Queen. At said time, WZPR flipped to Mainstream Rock as "Z92.3". The station is playing rock music from the 1970s, 1980s, 1990s, and Today. The first song on "Z92.3" was For Those About to Rock (We Salute You) by AC/DC.

On April 30, 2024, WZPR changed its format from mainstream rock to hot adult contemporary, temporarily picking up WCXL's format after that station went silent. Davis Media planned to buy the station and others but the deal will not happen.

On August 1, 2024, WZPR ceased operations under Jam Media.

In November 2024 U.S. Bankruptcy Judge Stacey Meisel approved the sale of WCXL-FM, WZPR-FM and OBXtoday.com to East Carolina Radio. A STA was granted by the FCC until East Carolina Radio could get WCXL and WZPR on the air. WZPR, under East Carolina Radio, began broadcasting on July 24th, 2025 as a 24 Hour a day affiliate of the Salem Radio Network.

As of 2026, WZPR now airs a Sports talk format.
