= WCNC (AM) =

Radio station in Elizabeth City, North Carolina

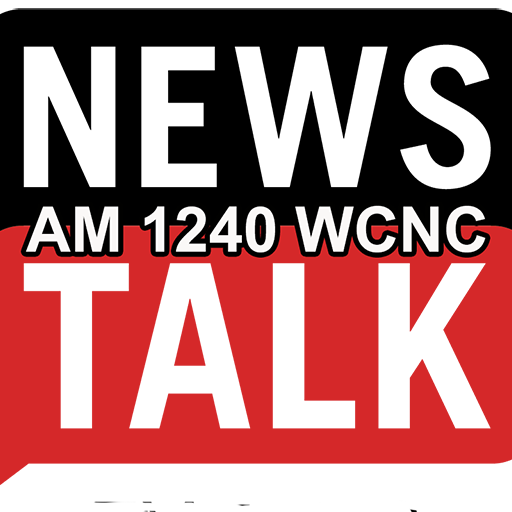
- Elizabeth City, North Carolina; United States
- Broadcast area: Elizabeth City-Nags Head
- Frequency: 1240 kHz
- Branding: AM 1240 WCNC

Programming
- Format: Conservative talk
- Affiliations: Bloomberg Radio; Premiere Networks; Westwood One

Ownership
- Owner: East Carolina Radio, Inc.; (East Carolina Radio of Elizabeth City)
- Sister stations: WOBX-AM

Technical information
- Licensing authority: FCC
- Facility ID: 49438
- Class: C
- Power: 1,000 Watts
- Transmitter coordinates: 36°18′38″N 76°13′56″W

Links
- Public license information: Public file; LMS
- Webcast: Listen Live
- Website: http://www.ecri.net/

WCNC (1240 AM) is a radio station broadcasting a news talk format. The station is licensed to serve the community of Elizabeth City, North Carolina, and is owned by East Carolina Radio.

During the 1960s, 1970s, and early 1980s, this station was adult contemporary.

In 1984, owner Joe Lamb sold the station to former DJ Hunt Thomas, who flipped it to oldies. The oldies format was not successful, and in 1988, Thomas was forced to file for Chapter 11 bankruptcy, and WCNC had to sign off. The station remained dark until 1990 when former owner Lamb took possession of the station and signed it back on with an easy listening / big band format.

In the mid-1990s the station was purchased by East Carolina Radio who flipped it to a news/talk format. Later the format was changed to Music of Your Life and WZBO (Edenton, North Carolina) aired the same programming. But in 2006 seeing the increase of Hispanic residents in the area, the station flipped to a syndicated Spanish-language music programming service called La GranD.

For a brief time WCNC and its sister station WZBO were simulcasting sports talk that originated on ECRI's WOBX-FM. Then in August 2022 the station was once again broadcasting classic country along with its sister station WZBO. The station's programming currently originates from ECRI's main studio facility in Nags Head, North Carolina. On November 28, 2023, WCNC-AM began simulcasting ECRI's News Talk format once again that originates on WOBX-AM transmitting in Wanchese, NC with the studio facility in Nags Head. WZBO-AM continues to air the classic country format. The same audio streamed from the WOBX-AM webstream is the audio that is on the air on WOBX-AM.
