= WZBO =

Radio station in Edenton–Elizabeth City, North Carolina

- Edenton, North Carolina; United States
- Broadcast area: Edenton-Elizabeth City-Nags Head
- Frequency: 1260 kHz
- Branding: AM 1260 WZBO

Programming
- Format: Classic country

Ownership
- Owner: Lawrence & Margaret Loesch
- Sister stations: WCNC

Technical information
- Licensing authority: FCC
- Facility ID: 36765
- Class: D
- Power: 1,000 watts day 34 watts night
- Transmitter coordinates: 36°05′N 76°36′W
- Translator: (107.3 MHz) W297CJ (Edenton)

Links
- Public license information: Public file; LMS
- Webcast: Listen Live
- Website: East Carolina Radio Inc

WZBO (1260 AM) is a radio station broadcasting a classic country format also heard on WCNC. Licensed to Edenton, North Carolina, United States, it serves the Edenton-Elizabeth City-Nags Head area. The station is currently owned by Lawrence & Margaret Loesch. The station's programming now originates from ECRI's main studio facilities in Nags Head, NC.

== History ==
At one time, WZBO and WCNC played adult standards from Music of Your Life. Later, the stations offered Spanish language programming. It also simulcasted sports talk from WOBX-FM in Wanchese, NC. As of August 2022, the classic country format is back on the air. It was simulcasting with WCNC in Elizabeth City, NC. As of November 28, 2023, WZBO-AM is the only ECRI station carrying the classic country format. The programming also simulcasts on its FM translator. 107.3 FM, that is located at the same transmitter facility as WZBO - AM in Edenton, NC. The web stream link for WCNC carries the classic country programming for WZBO-AM.
