= WOBX-FM =

- Manteo, North Carolina; United States
- Broadcast area: Elizabeth City-Nags Head
- Frequency: 98.1 MHz
- Branding: 98.1 The OBX

Programming
- Format: Adult album alternative

Ownership
- Owner: East Carolina Radio, Inc.
- Sister stations: WOBR-FM; WOBX; WRSF

History
- First air date: 1998 (as WBGI)
- Former call signs: WBGI (1998–2000)
- Call sign meaning: Outer Banks

Technical information
- Licensing authority: FCC
- Facility ID: 73365
- Class: C2
- ERP: 50,000 watts horizontal; 50,300 watts vertical
- HAAT: 137.2 meters (450 ft)
- Transmitter coordinates: 35°51′54.6″N 75°38′58.6″W

Links
- Public license information: Public file; LMS
- Webcast: Listen live
- Website: www.981theobx.com

WOBX-FM (98.1 MHz) is a radio station broadcasting an adult album alternative format. Licensed to Manteo, North Carolina, United States, it serves the Elizabeth City-Nags Head area. The station is owned by East Carolina Radio.

== History ==
In the early 2000s, WOBX-FM was branded as "98-1 OBX" with a hot adult contemporary format. On May 14, 2004, WOBX-FM dropped the hot AC format. After seven weeks of stunting, on June 25, 2004, the station changed to active rock branded as "98X". On June 21, 2009, WOBX-FM rebranded as "98 OBX", but kept the active rock format.

On August 30, 2010, WOBX-FM changed its format to classic hits, branded as "Nick Radio". On September 13, 2010, WOBX-FM changed its format to news/talk, branded as "Newstalk 98.1".

On March 27, 2015, WOBX-FM flipped to sports talk as "98.1 The Score", adding Washington Nationals baseball and Westwood One's sporting event broadcasts. WOBX-FM also aired sports talk shows from the Fox Sports Radio and CBS Sports Radio networks.

On April 30, 2024, WOBX-FM began stunting with a wide variety of music as "98.1 The Glitch"; the sports format moved to WOBX (1530 AM). Two days later, on May 2 at noon, the station changed format to adult album alternative, branded as "98.1 The OBX". The first song on "The OBX" was "Dog Days Are Over" by Florence and the Machine.
