= WOBX (AM) =

- Wanchese, North Carolina; United States
- Broadcast area: Elizabeth City-Nags Head
- Frequency: 1530 kHz
- Branding: AM 1530 FM 103.3 The Score

Programming
- Format: Sports
- Affiliations: Fox Sports Radio; Washington Nationals Radio Network

Ownership
- Owner: East Carolina Radio, Inc,
- Sister stations: WOBR-FM; WOBX-FM; WRSF

History
- First air date: 1970 (as WOBR)
- Former call signs: WOBR (1970–2000)

Technical information
- Licensing authority: FCC
- Facility ID: 73367
- Class: D
- Power: 250 watts day
- Transmitter coordinates: 35°51′52.6″N 75°38′58.6″W
- Translator: 103.3 W277DO (Wanchese)

Links
- Public license information: Public file; LMS
- Webcast: Listen live
- Website: www.am1530wobx.com

WOBX (1530 kHz) is an AM radio station broadcasting a sports format. Licensed to Wanchese, North Carolina, United States, it serves the Elizabeth City-Nags Head area. The station is owned by East Carolina Radio, Inc.

== History ==
The station began broadcasting as WOBR at 11:45 a.m. on May 29, 1970, at its studio/transmitter site near Wanchese, North Carolina, with a power of 250 watts, licensed for daytime-only operation. The first manager was G. Chambers Williams, III. WOBR was the first radio station to sign on in the Outer Banks.

Throughout the 1970s and early 1980s, WOBR had an adult contemporary format. By the mid-1980s it had gone to a country format. In the late 1980s, the station went to a religious format. On April 11, 2000, the calls were changed to WOBX.
