= WRSF =

- Columbia, North Carolina; United States
- Broadcast area: Elizabeth City-Nags Head, North Carolina
- Frequency: 105.7 MHz
- Branding: Dixie 105.7

Programming
- Format: Country music

Ownership
- Owner: East Carolina Radio, Inc.

History
- First air date: 1981
- Former call signs: WWOK (4/9/1987-6/24/1987)

Technical information
- Licensing authority: FCC
- Facility ID: 31940
- Class: C1
- ERP: 100,000 watts
- HAAT: 187 meters (614 ft)
- Transmitter coordinates: 35°53′18″N 76°13′50″W

Links
- Public license information: Public file; LMS
- Webcast: Listen Live
- Website: dixie1057.com

WRSF (105.7 FM) is a radio station broadcasting a country music format. Licensed to Columbia, North Carolina, United States, it serves the northeastern North Carolina area. The station is currently owned by East Carolina Radio, Inc.

This station had signed on in 1982 as automated assist adult contemporary WWOK "OK 106" broadcasting from its transmitter site in Tyrrell County, North Carolina, near its city of license, Columbia. The station also ran the overnight show Nighttime America and Solid Gold Saturday Night from The RKO Radio Network. In 1986, the station moved its studios and offices to Kill Devil Hills in the Nags Head Resort area of Dare County and became a live adult contemporary format as WRSF, Surf 106. The station evolved into a contemporary hit radio format by 1988. In 1989, the station went to a soft rock format, but in 1992 briefly returned to the contemporary hit format before switching to country in December 1992 as "Dixie 105.7".

The station airs Dixie After Dark at night.
