= KFDI-FM =

Country music radio station in Wichita, Kansas

- Wichita, Kansas; United States
- Broadcast area: Wichita, Kansas
- Frequency: 101.3 MHz
- Branding: Country 101.3 KFDI

Programming
- Format: Country

Ownership
- Owner: SummitMedia; (SM-KFDI, LLC)
- Sister stations: KFKB; KICT-FM; KFXJ; KYQQ

History
- First air date: 1972
- Call sign meaning: Similar to the Farmers and Bankers Life Insurance Company (see KFKB)

Technical information
- Licensing authority: FCC
- Facility ID: 72357
- Class: C
- ERP: 100,000 watts
- HAAT: 347 meters (1,138 ft)
- Transmitter coordinates: 37.796°N 97.533°W

Links
- Public license information: Public file; LMS
- Webcast: Listen live
- Website: www.kfdi.com

KFDI-FM (101.3 MHz) is a 100 kW radio station operating in Wichita, Kansas. Identifying as "Today's KFDI-FM 101.3, Wichita's Country Favorites," the station runs a contemporary country music format. KFDI has a strong emphasis on news, weather, and traffic with the largest news radio team in Kansas and the only one staffed 24/7/366. The station is owned by SummitMedia. Its studios are located just north of Wichita and the transmitter is located outside Colwich, Kansas.

== News team ==
The news team includes News Producer George Lawson, morning drive anchor and reporter Jacob Weston, and reporters and anchors Ryan Arnold, Lance Ferguson, and Chris Maslen.

== History ==
KFDI-FM has been playing country music since about 1972. Until 2002, the KFDI calls were also on sister station 1070 AM (now KFKB; the AM station first went on the air in 1962). Numerous influential disc jockeys and programmers have worked at the stations through the years, including Pat James (now operations manager at KHUT in Hutchinson, Kansas), Beverlee Brannigan, CMA award winners Brian Pierce and Kellie Michaels, CMA Award winners Dan Tooker and Jon Watkins, Colby Ericson, Rick Regan, Mike Oatman, Gary Hightower (formerly on XM Satellite Radio's Willie's Place as "Catfish"), Terry Burford, Dugg Collins, Johnny Western, Buddy Nichols, Orin Friesen, Scott Piper, Jerry "Attaboy" Adams, Andy "O" (Mike Oatman's son), "Willie Wheelchair", Larry Scott, Dave Donahue, "Lovable" Larry Stonecipher (now on air part time at KHUT), "Gentle" Ben Ingram (now at KWLS in Winfield, Kansas), and many more. Oatman, Burford, Collins, Western, Scott and Donahue are members of the Country Music Disc Jockey's Hall of Fame. Friesen was named the International Bluegrass Music Association (IBMA)'s very first Bluegrass Broadcaster of the Year in 1990. He also produced the IBMA awards show from 1990 to 2000.

Until 1999, the KFDI stations were owned by Wichita, Kansas–based Great Empire Broadcasting. Great Empire was owned by Mike Oatman and Mike Lynch. (Lynch is also in the Country Music Disc Jockey's Hall of Fame in the Broadcasting Executives section.) At its peak, Great Empire was the largest chain of country music stations in the United States. Other country stations in the group were KVOO and KVOO-FM in Tulsa, WOW and WOW-FM in Omaha, and KTTS and KTTS-FM in Springfield, Missouri. At one time, they had also owned stations in Denver (KRBQ and KRBQ-FM) and Shreveport (KWKH, home of the "Louisiana Hayride") All of the stations went by the "Radio Ranch" moniker and were full service country music stations. Local news, weather and traffic were emphasized. Lost pet reports were also aired on the stations. The Great Empire stations were purchased by Journal Broadcast Group in 1999.

On July 30, 2014, it was announced that the E. W. Scripps Company would acquire Journal Communications in an all-stock transaction. The combined firm retained their broadcast properties and spun off their print assets as Journal Media Group. Ahead of the merger, Journal was required by the FCC to divest KFTI-FM, which was sold to Envision in December 2014. KFDI and its four sister stations (KICT-FM, KFXJ, KYQQ, KFTI) merged with the E.W. Scripps Company on April 1, 2015. Scripps exited radio in 2018; the Wichita stations went to SummitMedia in a four-market, $47 million deal completed on November 1, 2018.
