= KSGF =

KSGF may refer to:

- KSGF (AM), a radio station (1260 AM) licensed to Springfield, Missouri, United States
- KSGF-FM, a radio station (104.1 FM) licensed to Ash Grove, Missouri, United States
- The ICAO code for Springfield-Branson National Airport, a public airport in Springfield, Missouri, United States
