= KSGF (AM) =

- Springfield, Missouri; United States
- Frequency: 1260 kHz
- Branding: 104.1 KSGF

Programming
- Format: News/talk
- Affiliations: Fox News Radio; Premiere Networks; Radio America; Westwood One

Ownership
- Owner: SummitMedia; (SM-KSGF-AM, LLC)
- Sister stations: KRVI; KSGF-FM; KSPW; KTTS-FM

History
- First air date: August 17, 1926
- Last air date: April 2025
- Former call signs: 9AYM (test transmissions, 1926); KGBX (1926–1987); KTTS (1987–2001); KTTF (2001–2002)
- Call sign meaning: Springfield

Technical information
- Licensing authority: FCC
- Facility ID: 62024
- Class: B
- Power: 5,000 watts
- Transmitter coordinates: 37°15′51.2″N 93°19′4.7″W

Links
- Public license information: Public file; LMS
- Webcast: Listen live
- Website: www.ksgf.com

KSGF (1260 kHz) was an AM radio station licensed to serve Springfield, Missouri, United States. The station, which launched in 1926 as KGBX, was owned by SummitMedia. The station was simulcast on KSGF-FM 104.1, which is licensed to Ash Grove, Missouri, United States.

== Programming ==
KSGF broadcast a news/talk radio format. Weekday programming included a local morning show called "KSGF Mornings with Nick Reed," hosted by Nick Reed with executive producer Sarah Myers. The remainder of the weekday was taken up by syndicated shows hosted by Glenn Beck, Dana Loesch, Sean Hannity, Mark Levin, Michael Savage, the Red Eye Radio, and Ben Shapiro. Weekend programming included Kim Komando, Joe Pags, and Cigar Dave. Local news came from the KTTS news team and national news came from Fox News Radio.

== History ==
=== Beginning ===
On May 31, 1922, a broadcasting station license, with the call letters WEAK, was issued to Julius B. Abercrombie in St. Joseph, Missouri. WEAK was deleted on September 26, 1923. Three years later, plans were made to reestablish a local station. While waiting for a broadcasting station authorization to be issued, test broadcasts by amateur station 9AYM were begun in August 1926, conducted by Abercrombe in conjunction with the Foster-Hall Tire Company, at a wavelength of 325 meters (923 kHz).

The broadcasting station, KGBX, was authorized later that month for Julius B. Abercrombe at 1221 Frederick Avenue in St. Joseph, and made its debut broadcast on the evening of August 17, 1926. The call letters were randomly assigned from an alphabetical roster of available call signs. KGBX was set up by entrepreneur Ralph D. Foster and partner Jerry Hall at the Foster-Hall Tire Company to advertise their Firestone Tire dealership. The original studios were located in the Foster-Hall tire store at 1221 Frederick Avenue, and originally broadcast at 500 watts.

KGBX began operations during a chaotic period when most government regulation had been suspended, with new stations free to be set up with few restrictions, including choosing their own transmitting frequencies. As of December 31, 1926, KGBX was reported to be transmitting on a self-assigned "split" frequency of 862 kHz. Following the establishment of the Federal Radio Commission (FRC), stations were initially issued a series of temporary authorizations starting on May 3, 1927, with KGBX reassigned to 860 kHz, which a short time later was changed to 1040 kHz. In addition, stations were informed that if they wanted to continue operating, they needed to file a formal license application by January 15, 1928, as the first step in determining whether they met the new "public interest, convenience, or necessity" standard. On May 25, 1928, the FRC issued General Order 32, which notified 164 stations, including KGBX, that "From an examination of your application for future license it does not find that public interest, convenience, or necessity would be served by granting it." However, the station successfully convinced the commission that it should remain licensed.

On November 11, 1928, the FRC implemented a major reallocation of station transmitting frequencies, as part of a reorganization resulting from its implementation of General Order 40. KGBX was initially assigned to 1210 kHz, although this was soon changed to sharing 1370 kHz with KWKC in Kansas City, Missouri.

In 1932, after the partnership dissolved, KGBX relocated to Springfield, Missouri, through a collaboration between Ralph D. Foster and Lester E. Cox. On September 1, 1936, KGBX became the area's affiliate of the NBC Red Network. In June 1940, the station upgraded its power to 5,000 watts, and on March 29, 1941, KGBX was moved from 1230 kHz to 1260 kHz as part of the implementation of the North American Regional Broadcasting Agreement. In 1944, the station was acquired by the Springfield Broadcasting Company. This new company was under the ownership of the publishers of the Springfield News & Leader and Springfield Leader & Press daily newspapers.

=== Era of change ===
After more than three decades of continuous ownership, Springfield Broadcasting Company sold KGBX to Stauffer Communications, Inc., on May 13, 1977. A few months later, KGBX dropped its longtime NBC affiliation for the CBS Radio Network on August 1, 1977, while retaining its adult contemporary music programming at the time. In January 1983, Stauffer Communications, Inc., reached an agreement to sell the station to Springcom, Inc. The deal was approved by the Federal Communications Commission (FCC) on February 25, and the transaction was consummated on March 8. In January 1985, KGBX began broadcasting in AM stereo using the Motorola C-QUAM system.

In February 1986, Springcom, Inc., contracted to sell the station to KGBX Communications, Inc. The deal was approved by the FCC on March 18, 1986, and the transaction was consummated on April 7, 1986. This ownership would prove short-lived as KGBX Communications, Inc., made a deal in August 1987, to sell this station to Springfield Great Empire Broadcasting, Inc. While approval for the sale was pending, the station applied to the FCC for a new callsign and was assigned KTTS on September 14, 1987. The deal was approved by the FCC on September 29, 1987, which immediately to a swap of call signs, formats, and networks between KGBX and KTTS (1400 AM).

=== Later years ===
In October 1998, after a number of internal shifts in the ownership of the license holder, Springfield Great Empire Broadcasting, Inc., agreed to transfer the broadcast license for KTTS to Great Empire Broadcasting, Inc. The deal was approved by the FCC on October 26, 1998, and the transaction was consummated on June 30, 1999. This too would prove a short-lived change. Great Empire Broadcasting, Inc., reached an agreement in July 1999 to sell this station to Journal Broadcast Corporation. The deal was approved by the FCC on July 20, 1999, and the transaction was consummated on July 27, 1999. In September of that year, KTTS stopped broadcasting in AM stereo.

Journal applied to the FCC for new call signs and the station was assigned KTTF on April 18, 2001. The call sign was chagned again, to KSGF, on June 14, 2002.

Journal Communications and the E. W. Scripps Company announced on July 30, 2014, that the two companies would merge to create a new broadcast company under the E.W. Scripps Company name that owned the two companies' broadcast properties, including KSGF. The transaction was completed in 2015, pending shareholder and regulatory approvals. Scripps exited radio in 2018; the Springfield stations went to SummitMedia in a four-market, $47 million deal completed on November 1.

KSGF went off the air in April 2025 after its towers were damaged in a storm. The FCC cancelled the station's license on September 10, 2026, after SummitMedia acknowledged in a status inquiry that KSGF would not be resuming operations. The closure of KSGF AM left its conservative talk format exclusive to its former FM simulcast, KSGF-FM 104.1.
