= KYQQ =

- Arkansas City, Kansas; United States
- Broadcast area: Wichita, Kansas
- Frequency: 106.5 MHz
- Branding: Radio Lobo 106.5

Programming
- Format: Regional Mexican

Ownership
- Owner: SummitMedia; (SM-KYQQ, LLC)
- Sister stations: KICT-FM; KFKB; KFDI-FM; KFXJ

History
- First air date: November 1, 1979 (as KBUZ)
- Former call signs: KBUZ (1979–1987); KWKL (1987–1990)

Technical information
- Licensing authority: FCC
- Facility ID: 37121
- Class: C0
- ERP: 100,000 watts
- HAAT: 390 meters (1,280 ft)
- Transmitter coordinates: 37°21′24″N 96°57′55″W

Links
- Public license information: Public file; LMS
- Webcast: Listen live
- Website: www.radiolobo1065.com

KYQQ (106.5 FM) is a radio station operating in Wichita, Kansas, United States, and licensed to Arkansas City, Kansas. Calling itself "Radio Lobo 106.5", the station airs a Regional Mexican format and is owned by SummitMedia. Its studios are located on North Old Lawrence Road in north Wichita. The transmitter is located north of Winfield, Kansas, operated by Arkansas City, Kansas.

== History ==
KYQQ signed on the air on November 1, 1979, as KBUZ under owners Gary and Ann Violet. KBUZ was very much a small family business, as the Violets literally built the station with their own hands, as Gary was a certified radio engineer. He not only did the engineering, but actually designed the building and built much of it at Strother Field between Winfield and Arkansas City. Gary and Ann also ran the station along with Gary's mother. The entire family lived in a set of two mobile homes just a few yards south of the station. Under Gary's ownership, the station tried a number of formats including Country, Top 40, and Hot AC. From 1980 through 1982, the station aired an eclectic mix of album-oriented rock that attempted to strike a balance in the Wichita radio market between the hard-edged KICT and the more mainstream KEYN. The station was programmed by Bruce Adamek. In 1981, it featured an evening show by Kevin Craig, a noted Wichita announcer whose distinctive voice was best known as the voice of the Dillons grocery store chain on radio and TV. Later in 1983, Jeff Garrett did a stint in the evening slot.

In the summer of 1983, Violet was approached by a Wichita night club owner through his primary club DJ Joe Turner, who at the time went by the moniker "Captain Disco" or "Captain D". They proposed adding a Sunday evening black-contemporary format. Violet was initially very skeptical; this was at a time when Michael Jackson had only recently breached the color barrier on MTV, leading to a resurgence of Black-influenced music on the Top 40 charts, and Prince had just begun to emerge as an artist. The proposed format, even for a few hours on Sundays, would be a striking contrast to the rest of the KBUZ broadcast schedule. However, Turner and his boss successfully convinced Violet that this insurgence of Black contemporary music would move beyond Wichita's Black community into the young adult and youth demographic. They also promised a tremendous outpouring of commercial support from the Black community.

Still not expecting much, Violet turned the project over to Wes Crenshaw, a weekend and fill-in air staff member, who was, at the time, covering afternoon drive. Crenshaw trained the new staff and oversaw commercial production through the debut of the show. The new format, which followed an urban contemporary design, turned out to be a rousing success in both ratings and revenue, creating the first consistent financial stream for KBUZ out of the coveted Wichita market. The success of the format caught Violet by surprise, but he began to recognize a winning formula. Crenshaw trained a second DJ, Rochel "R.W." Wright, who was then added to the lineup (and later moved up to Program Director for KBUZ). When the next Arbitron ratings book came out, KBUZ had jumped dramatically, scoring at or near the top of the ratings in the experimental time slots. Violet came to believe that the urban format was the best shot KBUZ had at attaining commercial success, and by May 1984, KBUZ completed the shift to the format, giving Wichita its first full-time urban station. KBUZ had a large following of listeners with its urban format despite its poor signal into Wichita and the market not having a very large African American population. Turner had been correct; as the number of successful black musicians grew nationally, the appeal of the urban format carried far beyond the black community.

In August 1987, the Violets sold KBUZ to Kelsey Broadcasting Corporation of Orlando, Florida. At 6 a.m. on August 5, Kelsey dropped the Urban format and flipped the station to adult contemporary as KWKL, "Lite 106.5". KBUZ's audience, mostly African Americans, were upset over the format change. By this time, the station upgraded its signal to broadcast full coverage over Wichita, and would move studios to Wichita in January 1988. At 6 a.m. on May 26, 1989, KWKL flipped to oldies as "Kool 106.5". In March 1990, Harris Broadcasting Systems, Inc. bought the station.

On July 3, 1990, KWKL dropped the oldies format and began stunting with a loop of David Bowie's "Changes", Bananarama's "I Heard a Rumour" and Glenn Frey's "The Heat is On" and a drop between the songs saying "All Good Things Must Come To An End, Out With The Old", referring to the demise of KWKL's oldies format. On July 5, at noon, the station flipped to adult Top 40 as KYQQ, "Q-106.5". The first song on "Q" was "Nothing's Gonna Stop Us Now" by Starship. It later moved into a mainstream Top 40 and briefly a dance/rhythmic Top 40 direction; during this time, KYQQ competed against the dominant Top 40 powerhouse KKRD, to limited success.

On July 17, 1992, KYQQ flipped to country as "Hot Country 106.5" (and would later be renamed back to "Q-106.5") to compete against country powerhouses KFDI-FM and KZSN. KYQQ had limited success against the two stations. In March 1994, Lesso, Inc., owned by Larry Steckline, bought the station. KFDI's owners, Great Empire Broadcasting, purchased KYQQ in December 1996. Great Empire sold its stations to Journal Broadcast Group in June 1999. On March 30, 2002, the country format was dropped for a Regional Mexican format. It first signed on as "La Maquina Musical" and later changed to "Radio Lobo".

On March 28, 2009, KYQQ's 1,250-foot (380 m) broadcast tower collapsed following more than two inches of freezing rain. The station resumed broadcasting the following day from a backup site at reduced power output.

On July 30, 2014, it was announced that the E. W. Scripps Company would acquire Journal Communications in an all-stock transaction. The combined firm retained their broadcast properties and spun off their print assets as Journal Media Group. KYQQ, their sister radio stations in the Wichita area and two TV stations were not initially included in the merger; in September, Journal filed to transfer these stations to Journal/Scripps Divestiture Trust (with Kiel Media Group as trustee). Scripps exited radio in 2018; the Wichita stations went to SummitMedia in a four-market, $47 million deal completed on November 1, 2018.
