= E. W. Scripps Company =

American media company

The E. W. Scripps Company
- Logo used since 2016

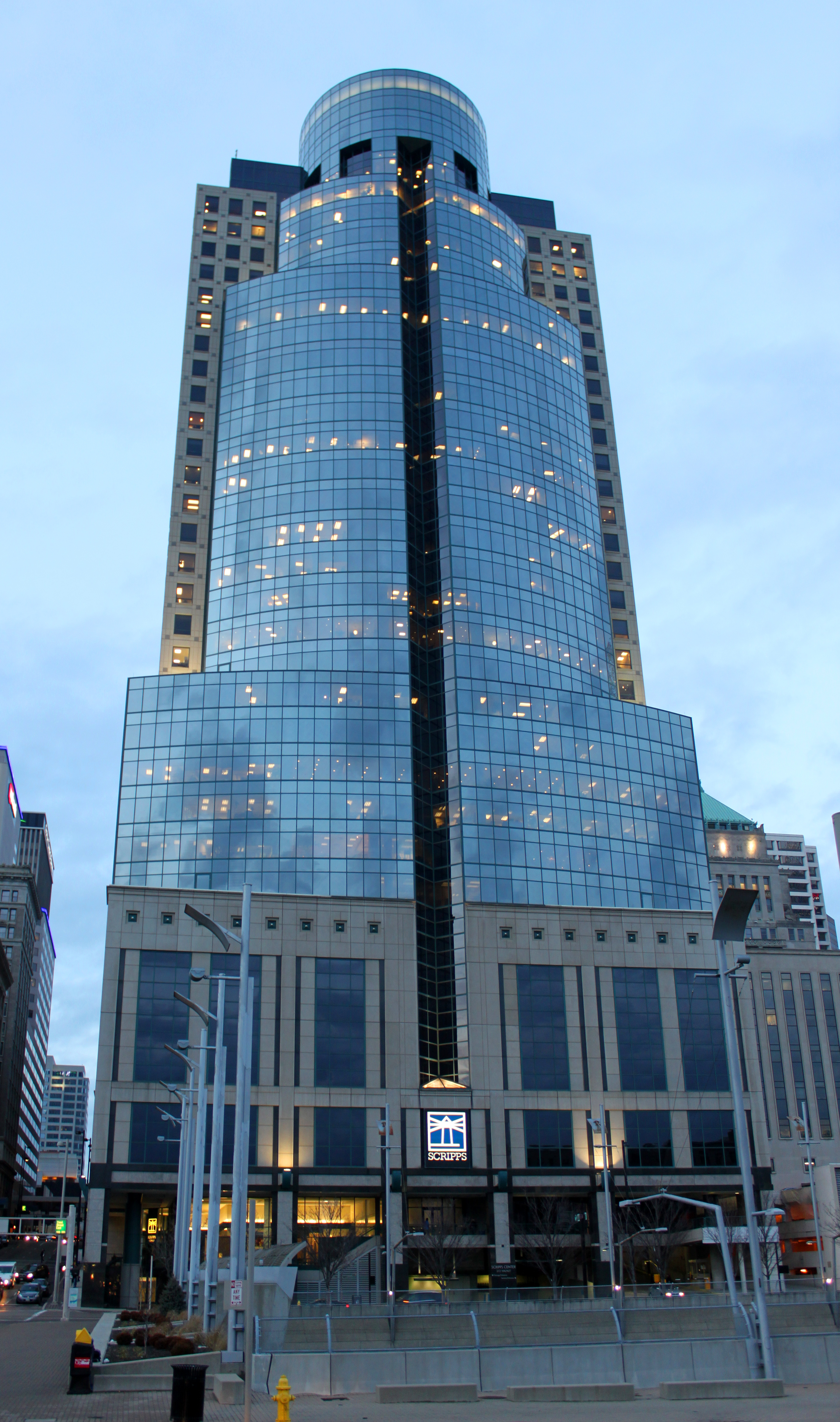
- Scripps headquarters in Scripps Center Cincinnati, Ohio
- Type: Public
- Traded as: Nasdaq: SSP (Class A) (1988–1991; 2018–present); NYSE: SSP (1991–2018)
- Industry: Broadcast television
- Founded: November 2, 1878; 148 years ago (as the Penny Press) in Cleveland, Ohio, U.S.
- Founder: Edward W. Scripps
- Headquarters: Scripps Center, Cincinnati, Ohio, United States
- Key people: Kim Williams (chairman); Adam P. Symson (president & CEO)
- Revenue: ▲US$2.51 billion (2024)
- Operating income: ▲US$412 million (2024)
- Net income: ▲US$146 million (2024)
- Total assets: ▼US$5.20 billion (2024)
- Total equity: ▲US$1.32 billion (2024)
- Number of employees: c. 5,000 (2024)
- Divisions: Scripps Networks
- Website: scripps.com

The E. W. Scripps Company, also known as Scripps, is an American broadcasting company founded in 1878 as a chain of daily newspapers by Edward Willis "E. W." Scripps and his sister, Ellen Browning Scripps. It was also formerly a media conglomerate. The company is headquartered at the Scripps Center in Cincinnati, Ohio. Its corporate motto is "Give light and the people will find their own way", which is symbolized by the media empire's longtime lighthouse logo.

In terms of assets owned, Scripps is the third largest operator of ABC affiliates, behind Sinclair Broadcast Group and Nexstar Media Group, and ahead of Hearst Television and Tegna. Scripps also owns a number of free-to-air multi-genre digital subchannel multicast networks through its Scripps Networks division, including the Ion Television network and Scripps News.

The company started out in the newspaper business, expanding into radio in the mid-1930s and television in the mid-1940s. It sold off its newspaper holdings in 2014 and exited radio in 2018.

== History ==
=== 19th century ===
The E. W. Scripps Company was founded as a newspaper company on November 2, 1878, when Edward Willis Scripps published the first issue of the Cleveland Penny Press.

In 1894, Scripps and his half-brother, George H. Scripps, organized their various papers into the first modern newspaper chain. In July 1895, it was named the Scripps-McRae League to reflect the leadership of Cincinnati Post general manager Milton A. McRae, a longtime partner. The company expanded during the decade to publish newspapers in California, Denver, Chicago, Dallas, Nashville, and elsewhere.

=== 20th century ===
In early November 1922, the Scripps-McRae League was renamed Scripps-Howard Newspapers to recognize company executive Roy W. Howard. On November 23, the E. W. Scripps Company was incorporated and placed in trust for Scripps' children and grandchildren. The company's shares were divided into two types: Class A Common Shares, which were traded on the New York Stock Exchange, and common voting shares, which were not publicly traded and elected a majority of the company's directors (a number of media companies, including the New York Times Company and the Washington Post organization, are governed by this system so that the descendants of the company's founders can keep control of the company). E. W. Scripps died in 1926.

On June 2, 1902, Scripps founded the Newspaper Enterprise Association (NEA), based in Cleveland, Ohio, as a news report service for different Scripps-owned newspapers. It started selling content to non-Scripps owned newspapers in 1907, and by 1909, it became a more general syndicate, offering comics, pictures and features as well. It moved from Cleveland to Chicago in 1915, with an office in San Francisco. NEA rapidly grew and delivered content to 400 newspapers in 1920 and about 700 in 1930. Today, it is the oldest syndicate still in operation.

Scripps created the United Press news agency in 1907 by uniting three smaller syndicates and controlled it until a 1958 merger with William Randolph Hearst's smaller competing agency, INS, to form United Press International. With the Hearst Corporation as a minority partner, UPI continued under Scripps management until it was sold off in 1982. A separate wire service, the Scripps Howard News Service, operated for 96 years from 1917 to 2013.

United Feature Syndicate was formed in 1919 as a division of UP to distribute editorial columns, features and comic strips, and became a dominant player in the syndication market in the fall of 1931 thanks to Scripps' acquisition of the New York World, which controlled the Pulitzer company's syndication arms, Press Publishing Co. and World Feature Service. In May 1978, Scripps merged United Feature Syndicate and Newspaper Enterprise Association to form United Media Enterprises.

The company expanded its newspaper holdings throughout the pre-World War II period, acquiring many titles and merging them, including the Rocky Mountain News and Knoxville News-Sentinel. A trickle of closures and sales occurred over the next few decades. In 1966, Scripps' New York World-Telegram was merged into the New York World Journal Tribune, which closed in 1967. Papers in Indianapolis, Washington, Houston and Fort Worth were closed in the 1960s and 1970s, and the former flagship Cleveland Press was sold in 1980. Scripps also closed properties in Memphis, Columbus, Thousand Oaks and El Paso throughout the 1980s and 1990s, while selling the Pittsburgh Press in 1992.

In 1985, the company went into home video foray with its acquisition of Kartes Video Communications in an effort to expand the marketplace. Two years later, Scripps Howard sold off Kartes Video Communications back to its founders, after an aborted deal where Scripps-Howard's acquisition of Hanes failed.

In 1997, Scripps bought daily newspapers in the Texas cities of Abilene, Wichita Falls, San Angelo and Plano, plus the paper in Anderson, South Carolina, from Harte-Hanks Communications, along with 25 non-daily newspapers and San Antonio-based KENS-TV and KENS-AM. The purchase price was to be between $605 and $775 million, depending on a federal ruling. (Scripps eventually spun off all of its newspapers into Journal Media Group in 2015.)

Scripps made its first foray into broadcasting in 1935, forming a company called Continental Radio and buying radio stations WCPO in Cincinnati and WNOX in Knoxville. After the war, In 1947, Scripps opened its first television station, Cleveland-based WEWS-TV, with Memphis-based WMC-TV and Cincinnati-based WCPO-TV in subsequent years. It now owns dozens of TV and radio stations. In the 1980s and 1990s, Scripps became a cable television provider and also developed programming for cable, notably SportSouth (currently FanDuel Sports Network South) in 1990 (in a joint venture with Turner Broadcasting and TCI), Food Network in 1993 and HGTV in 1994. (Scripps spun off its cable properties into Scripps Network Interactive in 2008.)

The company went public with an IPO in 1988 and was traded on the NASDAQ. It owned 20 daily newspapers and 9 television stations at the time, and cable systems in 10 states. The company completed a new downtown Cincinnati headquarters, the 35-story high-rise Scripps Center, in 1990. In 1991, Scripps transferred its shares to the New York Stock Exchange.

=== 21st century ===
In June 2000, E.W. Scripps Company announced that it would launch the Fine Living Network (later renamed as the Cooking Channel in 2010), the channel was originally scheduled to launch in September 2001, it eventually launched on August 21, 2002.

On October 12, 2004, the first incarnation of Scripps Networks (then a division of the E.W. Scripps Company) announced that it would acquire Great American Country (later renamed as Great American Family in 2022) from Jones Radio Network for $140 million.

In October 2007, Scripps announced that it would separate into two publicly traded companies: The E. W. Scripps Company (newspapers, TV stations, licensing/syndication) and Scripps Networks Interactive (HGTV, Food Network, DIY Network, Cooking Channel (formerly known as Fine Living), Travel Channel and Great American Country). The transaction was completed on July 1, 2008.

After a test launch at WFTS-TV in 2009, Scripps television stations launched YouTube channels in 2010. These are similar to YouTube channels operated by Hearst Television and LIN Television.

On February 24, 2011, United Media struck a distribution deal with Universal Uclick (now known as Andrews McMeel Syndication) for syndication of the company's 150 comic strip and news features, which became effective on June 1 of that year. At that point, United Media, and by extension the Scripps Company, exited the syndication business.

On September 12, 2011, Scripps partnered with Cox Media Group and Raycom Media to launch Right This Minute, a viral video program. On the same day, Scripps launched The List, a news magazine. Both were part of an approach for "homegrown" programming—programming created by Scripps. Raycom also launched America Now on the same day. The creator of RTM and The List applied this "homegrown" programming approach to Tegna in 2015, with the launch of T.D. Jakes. Scripps launched Let's Ask America in 2013 (now cancelled), partnering with Telepictures to do so, and Pickler and Ben in 2017.

On October 3, 2011, Scripps announced it was purchasing the television arm of McGraw-Hill for $212 million. This purchase nearly doubled the number of Scripps stations to 19 with a combined reach of 13% of U.S. households. Upon the 2012 death of E. W. Scripps' grandson, Robert Scripps, the Edward W. Scripps Trust was dissolved and its stock divided among the surviving trustees.

In December 2013, Scripps acquired the digital video news service Newsy for $35 million, the service was later renamed as Scripps News in 2023.

On July 30, 2014, Scripps and Journal Communications announced that the two companies would merge and spin-off their newspaper assets. The deal created a broadcast group under the E. W. Scripps Company name and retaining the Cincinnati headquarters, and a newspaper company based in Milwaukee, Wisconsin, under the Journal Media Group name. The FCC approved the deal on December 12, 2014, and it was approved by shareholders on March 11, 2015. The merger and spinoff were completed on April 1, 2015. In turn, Journal Media Group was acquired by Gannett Company on April 8, 2016. Gannett had also shed their television and broadcast operations into a spin-off, Tegna, months after the Scripps-Journal merger.

In April 2016, Demand Media announced the sale of the humor/listicle website Cracked.com to E. W. Scripps. In June, it acquired podcast service Stitcher from Deezer.

On August 1, 2017, Scripps announced the purchase of Katz Broadcasting and its three networks plus Bounce which Katz operates, for $292 million, acquiring the other 95% of the company. The purchase was completed on October 2, 2017. On May 22, 2018, Scripps announced that it was changing its common stock listing back from the NYSE to Nasdaq, which occurred on June 4, 2018.

On November 17, 2025, it was reported that Sinclair Broadcast Group had acquired an 8% stake in Scripps' stock, and was pursuing a potential takeover of the company. Scripps stated that its board "will take all steps appropriate to protect the company and the company's shareholders from the opportunistic actions of Sinclair or anyone else". A takeover attempt would also be complicated by the fact that any deal would have to be approved by the Scripps family, since it holds 93% of the company's voting rights. Scripps adopted a shareholder rights plan after Sinclair made an unsolicited cash-and-stock offer at $7 per-share; on December 16, 2025, the company's board rejected the offer.

On January 16, 2026, Sinclair filed letters with the Securities and Exchange Commission documenting its recent exchange with E.W. Scripps regarding a proposed acquisition. In the filing, Sinclair reiterated its willingness to pursue a combination with Scripps, despite the latter’s rejection of its offer.

On January 19, 2026, Sinclair confirmed the statement: “Over the last few weeks, Sinclair has continued to reinforce to Scripps its willingness to engage on a proposed Sinclair-Scripps combination. Scripps has refused the invitations to speak with its single largest shareholder and instead has stated its preference to execute its standalone plan. Our last proposal to Scripps represents a premium of more than 2.4x more over Scripps’ unadjusted share price, while the cash portion alone represents a 32.7% premium over the unadjusted share price. We believe this proposal is attractive to Scripps’ shareholders and, at a minimum, is worthy of engagement. As we evaluate our options, the previously announced strategic review of Sinclair’s Broadcast business and work related to the separation of Ventures will continue. Our Board and management team are committed to unlocking the full potential of both businesses and driving continued value creation for all Sinclair shareholders."

On February 26, 2026, Scripps announced its repurchase of all Inyo stations.

== Scripps newspapers ==
Name	City	Founded in	Purchased in	Fate	Date
Cleveland Press	Cleveland, Ohio	1880	—N/a	sold (Note: Acquired by Joseph E. Cole.)	1980 (Note: Closed on June 17, 1982.)
The Seattle Star	Seattle, Washington	1899	—N/a	sold	1920 (Note: Closed on August 13, 1947.)
The Toledo News-Bee	Toledo, Ohio	1903	—N/a	closed	1938 (Note: Assets acquired by The Toledo Blade.)
The Day Book	Chicago, Illinois	1911	—N/a	closed	1917
Houston Press	Houston, Texas	1911	—N/a	closed	1964 (Note: Assets acquired by The Houston Chronicle.)
The Washington Daily News	Washington, D.C.	1921	—N/a	sold	1972 (Note: Assets acquired by, and merged into, The Washington Star.)
Fort Worth Press	Fort Worth, Texas	1921	—N/a	closed	1975
The Cincinnati Post	Cincinnati, Ohio	1881	1881	closed (Note: The paper's Covington, Kentucky, edition converted to online-only as KyPost.com.)	2007
Evansville Courier & Press	Evansville, Indiana	1845	1906	spun off (Note: Spun off to Journal Media Group.)	2015
Memphis Press-Scimitar	Memphis, Tennessee	1880	1906	closed	1983
Indianapolis Times	Indianapolis, Indiana	1888	1922	closed	1965
San Francisco News	San Francisco, California	1903	1922	merged	1959 (Note: Merged into Hearst's San Francisco Call-Bulletin to form The News-Call Bulletin in 1959. Hearst acquired complete control in 1962 and merged it into the San Francisco Examiner in 1965.)
Youngstown Telegram	Youngstown, Ohio	1885	1922	closed	1936 (Note: Assets acquired by the Youngstown Vindicator Printing Company and merged into The Vindicator.)
Pittsburgh Press	Pittsburgh, Pennsylvania	1884	1923	sold	1992 (Note: Assets acquired by Block Communications and merged into the Pittsburgh Post-Gazette.)
The Albuquerque Tribune	Albuquerque, New Mexico	1922	1923	closed	2008
Rocky Mountain News	Denver, Colorado	1859	1926	closed	2009
The Knoxville News-Sentinel	Knoxville, Tennessee	1886	1926	spun off	2015
New York World-Telegram	New York City	1867	1927	merged	1966 (Note: Merged into the New York Journal American and New York Herald Tribune to form the New York World Journal Tribune, jointly owned by Scripps, Hearst and John Hay Whitney. The World Journal Tribune folded on May 5, 1967.)
The Buffalo Times	Buffalo, New York	1883	1929	sold	1938 (Note: Closed on July 30, 1939.)
El Paso Herald-Post	El Paso, Texas	1881	1931	closed	1997
The Commercial Appeal	Memphis, Tennessee	1841	1936	spun off	2015
The Register-Pajaronian	Watsonville, California	1868	1940	sold (Note: Acquired by News Media Corp.)	1995
Birmingham Post-Herald	Birmingham, Alabama	1850 (Note: The paper's roots trace back to the Elyton Herald, founded 21 years before Birmingham's incorporation as a city.)	1950 (Note: Merged with the Scripps-owned Birmingham Post in 1950.)	closed	2005
Columbus Citizen-Journal	Columbus, Ohio	1899 (Note: Also had roots in The Ohio State Journal, which was founded in 1814.)	1959 (Note: Merged with the Scripps-owned Columbus Citizen in 1959.)	closed	1985
The Stuart News (Note: Part of Treasure Coast Newspapers.)	Stuart, Florida	1913	1965	spun off	2015
Fullerton News Tribune	Fullerton, California	1891	1973	sold (Note: Acquired by Community Media Enterprises.)	1987
The Jupiter Courier	Jupiter, Florida	1957	1978	spun off	2015 (Note: Closed on April 25, 2019.)
Naples Daily News	Naples, Florida	1923	1986	spun off	2015
Kitsap Sun	Bremerton, Washington	1935	1986	spun off	2015
Redding Record Searchlight	Redding, California	1938	1986	spun off	2015
Thousand Oaks News Chronicle	Thousand Oaks, California	1953	1986	merged	1995 (Note: Merged into the co-owned Ventura County Star with publication relocated to Camarillo, California.)
Ventura County Star	Camarillo, California	1925	1992	spun off	2015
Indian River Press Journal	Vero Beach, Florida	1919	1996	spun off	2015
Anderson Independent-Mail	Anderson, South Carolina	1899	1997	spun off	2015
Abilene Reporter-News	Abilene, Texas	1881	1997	spun off	2015
San Angelo Standard-Times	San Angelo, Texas	1884	1997	spun off	2015
The Daily Camera	Boulder, Colorado	1890	1997	sold (Note: Acquired by Media News Group.)	2009
Times Record News	Wichita Falls, Texas	1907	1997	spun off	2015
The Gleaner	Henderson, Kentucky	1883	2000	spun off	2015
The St. Lucie News-Tribune	Fort Pierce, Florida	1903	2000	spun off	2015
Colorado Daily	Boulder, Colorado	1892	2005	sold	2009

=== Syndicates ===
- United Media (1978–2011), consisted of:
  - United Feature Syndicate (est. 1919) – syndicated many notable comic strips, including Peanuts, Garfield, Li'l Abner, Dilbert, Nancy and Marmaduke
  - Newspaper Enterprise Association (est. 1902) – originally a secondary news service to the Scripps Howard News Service, later evolved into a general syndicate; best known for syndicating Alley Oop, Freckles and His Friends, The Born Loser and Frank and Ernest, in addition to an annual Christmas comic strip

The distribution rights to properties syndicated by United Media were outsourced to Universal Uclick in February 2011. While United Media effectively ceased to exist, Scripps still maintains copyrights and intellectual property rights.

Scripps also operated United Press International (United Press from its 1907 inception until a 1958 merger with Hearst's International News Service) until selling it off in 1982.

== Broadcasting ==
Scripps' broadcast television stations division—also commonly known as Scripps Media or Scripps Howard Broadcasting, formerly Continental Radio, currently owns or operates 62 television stations in forty-three markets, with full-power and low-power stations as well as rebroadcaster, translator, repeater and satellite stations included. Among them, nineteen ABC affiliates, twelve CBS affiliates, eleven NBC affiliates, six Fox affiliates, two specialty network affiliated stations, and five stations independent of any network affiliation.

=== History ===
==== 1935–1947: Early history, radio era ====
The company was formed in 1935 when Scripps Howard made its foray into broadcasting by purchasing radio station WFBE, renaming it WCPO after newspaper The Cincinnati Post.

Later on, Scripps purchased radio station, WNOX from the Sterchi Brothers furniture chain. In 1936, The Commercial Appeal was purchased by the Scripps Howard newspaper chain, which included the WMC stations. In 1937, the Memphis Press-Scimitar bought out WGBC from First Baptist Church of Memphis in 1937 and changed the letters to WMPS.

==== 1947–1977: The television era ====
In 1947, Scripps expanded its broadcast holdings by opening its first television station, Cleveland-based WEWS-TV. This was followed in 1948 by Memphis-based WMC-TV and Cincinnati-based WCPO-TV in 1949.

The company expanded its television holdings in 1961 by purchasing West Palm Beach station WPTV-TV from the Phipps family. It was followed nearly nine years later by its purchase of its Tulsa station KVOO-TV from Central Plains Enterprises. The sale received FCC approval on November 25, 1970, and was finalized the following month on December 31. On January 1, 1971, the day after the Scripps purchase was completed, the station changed its call letters to KTEW-TV (standing for "Tulsa E.W. Scripps", and also easily interpreted as sounding like the phoneticism for "two"). This change was made due to an FCC rule in effect at the time that banned TV and radio stations in the same market, but with different owners from sharing the same call letters.

By 1963, the company has taken on its familiar name Scripps-Howard Broadcasting Company, and made it public.

==== 1977–1994: The independent expansion ====
In 1977, the company expanded its focus onto independent station territory by purchasing KBMA-TV in Kansas City from the Businessmen's Assurance Company of America, but in 1981 the station was renamed to KSHB-TV. Nearly seven years later, in 1984, after Edwin Cooperstein rebuffed a bid from Tribune Company, Scripps immediately purchased independent station, KNXV-TV in Phoenix. To make room for the sale, Scripps was required to divest itself of radio stations KMEO-AM-FM.

Nearly one year later, Scripps purchased ABC station, WXYZ-TV in Detroit, and independent station WFTS-TV in Tampa Bay from Capital Cities Communications as part of a spin-off reorganization, after the FCC felt that the combination of Cap Cities and ABC exceeded the new ownership limit of 12 stations and the 25% national reach limit. On October 9, 1986, two of Scripps' stations in Phoenix and Kansas City became affiliates of the Fox Broadcasting Company television network. A third independent station in Tampa Bay joined Fox in 1988 after WTOG-TV disaffiliated from the network.

In 1988, the broadcasting division of the company started its own production company Scripps Howard Productions in order to produce and market television programs.

From 1990 to 1995, Scripps was a partner in the regional sports network SportSouth, along with Turner Broadcasting and Tele-Communications, Inc.; in 1996 the network was sold to News Corporation and became Fox Sports South.

In the summer of 1990, Scripps bought out the NBC Baltimore affiliate WMAR-TV from Gillett Communications, but in February 1991 the transfer was canceled after Scripps accused Gillett of misreporting WMAR's financial statements. Gillett then took legal action against Scripps, but both sides settled and the sale went forward. Scripps took control of the station in the spring of 1991.

On July 19, 1993, Scripps sold WMC-AM-FM-TV to Atlanta businessman Bert Ellis and his new company, Ellis Communications.

In 1994, Scripps acquired the Knoxville-based Cinetel Productions to serve as a production base for a new home lifestyle-oriented cable network, which would eventually launch in December as HGTV. and then launched a spin-off of HGTV known as DIY Network (later renamed as the Magnolia Network in January 2022) in December 1999.

==== 1994–2000: Realignments and change ====
On May 23, 1994, Fox purchased a 20 percent stake in New World Communications, owner of multiple long-tenured major-market CBS affiliates, in what was a $500 million investment. In turn, 12 stations either owned by—or in the process of being purchased by—New World would switch network affiliations to Fox after existing contracts expired per-station. Three of the displaced Fox affiliates were owned by Scripps: KNXV-TV, WFTS-TV and KSHB-TV. This prompted CBS to court Scripps for a deal with KNXV and WFTS, along with long-tenured ABC affiliates WXYZ-TV and WEWS-TV; a proposed deal also included CBS purchasing a minority stake in HGTV. ABC's counteroffer to keep WEWS and WXYZ was met with a demand by Scripps that WMAR, WFTS and KNXV also link with ABC.

The demand came at the expense of two equally long-standing ABC affiliates: WJZ-TV had been with the network since 1948 while KTVK emerged in the 1980s as a market leader for local news, albeit family-owned and not part of a larger chain. ABC offered $25 million to Scripps to exclude KNXV, which was rejected in what ABC executive Bryce Rathbone stated as Scripps "[having] a gun to their head". Announced on June 15, 1994, the ABC-Scripps agreement included all three stations Scripps demanded join the network, along with WEWS and WXYZ. For WFTS, the announcement came with an expedited buildout of a news department, with local newscasts debuting the day of their switch. The other displaced Fox affiliate, KSHB, affiliated with NBC as a replacement for WDAF-TV. ABC later signed an unrelated affiliation deal with WCPO-TV in September 1995, taking effect on June 3, 1996.

In October 1995, Comcast announced the purchase of Scripps' cable provider operation.

In 1997, Scripps bought daily newspapers in the Texas cities of Abilene, Wichita Falls, San Angelo and Plano, plus the paper in Anderson, S.C. from Harte-Hanks Communications, along with 25 non-daily newspapers and San Antonio-based KENS-TV and KENS. The purchase price was to be between $605 and $775 million, depending on a federal ruling. (Scripps eventually spun off all of its newspapers into Journal Media Group in 2015. and then sold KENS and their TV counterpart to the A.H. Belo Corporation in 1997, in exchange for the acquisition of 56% stake in the Food Network for $75 million.)

In March 1996, KSHB owner Scripps Howard Broadcasting reached a deal to manage KMCI under a local marketing agreement. That August, KMCI then dropped much of its home shopping programming and rebranded as "38 Family Greats", with a family-oriented general entertainment format from 6:00 a.m. to midnight, with HSN programming being relegated to the overnight hours. The new KMCI lineup included an inventory of programs that KSHB owned but had not had time to air after it switched to NBC in 1994.

Exercising an option from the 1996 pact with Miller, Scripps bought KMCI outright for $14.6 million in 2000, forming a legal duopoly with KSHB. In 1998, the company sold Scripps Howard Productions, and Cinetel Productions was renamed to Scripps Productions.

==== 2000–2008: The Shop at Home era ====
Scripps also previously owned the Shop at Home Network from 2000 until 2006. Shop at Home in turn owned five television stations, all as a division of its cable network division managed separately from the company's traditional commercial network affiliate stations.

Attempts to use Shop at Home as a complementary service to Food Network and HGTV by selling products connected to personalities of those networks were middling compared to competitors QVC and HSN. On May 22, 2006, Scripps announced that it was to cease operations of the network and intended to sell each of Shop at Home's five owned and operated television stations. Jewelry Television eventually acquired Shop at Home, but Scripps still intended to sell its affiliated stations (Jewelry Television discontinued most Shop at Home operations in March 2008). On September 26, 2006, Scripps announced that it was selling its Shop at Home TV stations to New York City-based Multicultural Television for $170 million.

==== 2008–present: Scripps today ====
In October 2007, Scripps announced that it would separate into two publicly traded companies: The E. W. Scripps Company (newspapers, TV stations, licensing/syndication) and Scripps Networks Interactive (Cooking Channel (formerly known as Fine Living), DIY Network, Food Network, Great American Country, HGTV, and Travel Channel). The transaction was completed on July 1, 2008.

After a test launch at WFTS-TV in 2009, Scripps television stations launched YouTube channels in 2010. These are similar to YouTube channels operated by Hearst Television and LIN Television.

Scripps was the recipient of the 2012 National Association of Broadcasters Distinguished Service Award.

On October 3, 2011, Scripps announced it was purchasing all seven television stations owned by The McGraw-Hill Companies for $212 million; the sale is a result of McGraw-Hill's decision to exit the broadcasting industry to focus on its other core properties, including its publishing unit. This deal was approved by the FTC on October 31 and the FCC on November 29. The deal was completed on December 30, 2011.

On February 10, 2014, Scripps announced it has reached a deal to acquire Buffalo ABC affiliate WKBW-TV and Detroit MyNetworkTV affiliate WMYD from Granite Broadcasting for $110 million. The sale was approved by the FCC on May 2, 2014, and was completed on June 16, 2014. This deal has created a duopoly between WMYD and ABC affiliate WXYZ-TV.

On July 30, 2014, Scripps and Journal Communications announced that the two companies would merge and spin-off their newspaper assets. The deal created a broadcast group under the E. W. Scripps Company name and retaining the Cincinnati headquarters, and a newspaper company based in Milwaukee, Wisconsin, under the Journal Media Group name. The FCC approved the deal on December 12, 2014, and it was approved by shareholders on March 11, 2015. The merger and spinoff were completed on April 1, 2015. In turn, Journal Media Group was acquired by Gannett Company on April 8, 2016. Gannett had also shed their television and broadcast operations into a spin-off, Tegna, months after the Scripps-Journal merger.

On January 25, 2018, it was announced that Scripps had placed its radio station unit for sale. The divestiture of these stations – which were acquired through the company's 2015 acquisition of Journal Communications – would result in the separation of Scripps's television stations in Tulsa, Omaha, Milwaukee, Boise and Tucson from their co-owned radio clusters (in the case of Tulsa, KJRH-TV would be separated from KFAQ for the second time; the two stations, then using the shared KVOO callsign, were first split up in 1970, when Central Plains Enterprises sold the then-KVOO-TV to Scripps). In June 2018, Griffin Communications reached a deal to buy the Scripps Tulsa radio cluster. The sale was completed on July 28, 2018. In July 2018, Good Karma Brands reached a deal to buy the Scripps Milwaukee radio cluster. The sale was completed on November 1, 2018.

On August 20, 2018, Scripps agreed to purchase ABC affiliates KXXV in Waco, Texas and satellite station KRHD-CD in Bryan, Texas and WTXL-TV in Tallahassee, Florida, which are being spun off from the Gray Television-Raycom Media merger in order to alleviate ownership conflicts involving Gray's ownership of CBS affiliate KWTX-TV and its semi-satellite KBTX-TV in the Waco market and CBS affiliate WCTV and Retro Television Network affiliate WFXU in the Tallahassee market.

On October 29, 2018, Cordillera Communications announced that it would sell all but one of its television stations to Scripps. KVOA in Tucson, Arizona is not included in the deal as Scripps already owns KGUN-TV and KWBA in that market, and Cordillera will concurrently sell KVOA to Quincy Media. The FCC approved the sale on April 5, 2019, and the sale was completed on May 1.

On March 20, 2019, Scripps announced that it would acquire eight of the 21 (initially 19) stations being divested as part of Nexstar Media Group's $580 million acquisition of Tribune Media. The Tribune stations include CBS affiliates WTKR in Norfolk and WTVR-TV in Richmond—both in Virginia, along with Fox affiliates KSTU in Salt Lake City, Utah and WXMI in Grand Rapids, Michigan and CW affiliates WPIX in New York City, WGNT in Norfolk, Virginia and WSFL-TV in Miami, Florida. The only Nexstar station being acquired is CW affiliate KASW in Phoenix, Arizona—which would create a duopoly with longtime Scripps-owned ABC affiliate KNXV-TV. Also, Nexstar has the option to buy WPIX back between March 31, 2020, and December 31, 2021. The FCC approved the sale on September 16 with all of the transactions being completed on September 19.

In July 2020, the company sold their Stitcher podcast service and assets to SiriusXM for $325 million.

On September 22, 2020, the company announced it was buying KCDO-TV and KSBS-CD from Newsweb Corporation for $9.5 million, pending approval of the Federal Communications Commission (FCC); this would make them sister stations to ABC affiliate KMGH-TV. For the time being, KCDO has moved Grit to its primary 3.1 subchannel. The sale was completed on November 20.

On September 24, 2020, Scripps announced the acquisition of American media company Ion Media, including its networks, Ion Television, Ion Plus, Qubo, and Ion Shop (three removed a few months later) for $2.65 billion.

Scripps finally completed its sale of WPIX to Mission Broadcasting on December 30, 2020, which will also allow the company to keep three of the Ion stations that were slated to be sold to a new company, Inyo Broadcast Holdings. The sales of WPPX-TV in Philadelphia, KKPX-TV in San Francisco and KPXM-TV in Minneapolis-St. Paul, Minnesota were contingent on whether or not the sale of WPIX would close and be finalized before Scripps completed its acquisition of Ion Media.

On October 2, 2024, E.W. Scripps Co. announced that it was laying off more than 200 people as it makes major cutbacks to its national news unit.

=== Scripps Sports (2022–present) ===
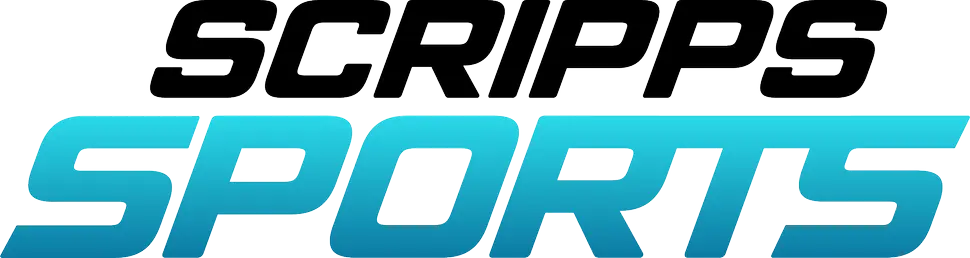
Logo of Scripps Sports

In late 2022, Scripps created an in-house sports division with the intent of offering its local stations or Ion to teams and leagues as an alternative to the fledgling regional sports network. The division, eventually called Scripps Sports, announced on April 20, 2023, a deal with Ion and the WNBA for a broadcast package airing on Friday nights during the regular season, with "WNBA Friday Night Spotlight on Ion" featuring both national and regional telecasts. It marked the WNBA's first agreement with an over-the-air broadcast network other than ABC since 2002, the last year of NBC's tenure as the league's primary broadcast partner.

On May 4, 2023, Scripps Sports announced a deal with a professional sports franchise, the NHL's Vegas Golden Knights, with ION affiliate KMCC serving as the flagship of a regional network of stations that would broadcast all non-exclusive regular-season games beginning with the 2023–24 season. KMCC also transferred its Ion Television programming to a subchannel and rebrand as an independent station, with KUPX-TV doing the same. Scripps also did not renew the affiliations with the CW on its second subchannels for its statewide Montana Television Network and converted them to independent stations to accommodate the broadcasts.

On October 5, 2023, Scripps Sports announced a deal with the NHL's Arizona Coyotes, with ABC affiliate KNXV's sub-channel Antenna TV (15.2) serving as the flagship network for all non-national exclusive games in the Phoenix market beginning with the 2023–24 season. The 2nd digital subchannel of KGUN-TV, in Tucson, as well as KUPX and the 2nd digital subchannel of KSTU, in Salt Lake City, also air Coyotes games.

On July 2, Scripps Sports, the sports division of the E. W. Scripps Company, announced a deal with the Florida Panthers, which would put games over the air on WSFL-TV beginning in the 2024–25 season.

=== Television stations ===
Stations are arranged alphabetically by state and by city of license.

- (**) – Indicates station was built and signed on by Scripps.

Media market	State/Dist.	Station	Purchased	Affiliation	Notes
Phoenix	Arizona	KNXV-TV	1985	ABC	
Phoenix	Arizona	KASW	2019	Independent	
Tucson	Arizona	KGUN-TV	2015	ABC; Ion (DT5)	
Tucson	Arizona	KWBA-TV	2015	Independent	
Bakersfield	California	KERO-TV	2011	ABC	
Bakersfield	California	KZKC-LD	2011	ABC	(Note: Translator of KERO.)
Los Angeles	California	KILM	2021	Bounce	
Los Angeles	California	KPXN-TV	2021	Ion	
Sacramento	California	KSPX-TV	2021	Ion	
San Diego	California	KGTV	2011	ABC	
San Diego	California	KZSD-LD	2011	ABC	(Note: Translator of KGTV.)
San Francisco	California	KKPX-TV	2021	Ion	
Santa Barbara–San Luis Obispo	California	KSBY	2019	NBC	
Colorado Springs	Colorado	KOAA-TV	2019	NBC	
Colorado Springs	Colorado	KKTV	2026	CBS	
Colorado Springs	Colorado	KZCS-LD	2011	Ion Mystery	
Denver	Colorado	KMGH-TV	2011	ABC	
Denver	Colorado	KZCO-LD	2011	Ion Mystery	
Denver	Colorado	KCDO-TV	2020	Independent	
Denver	Colorado	KSBS-CD	2020	Independent	(Note: Satellite of KCDO-TV.)
Grand Junction	Colorado	KJCT-CD	2026	ABC; Ion (LD3)	
Grand Junction	Colorado	KKCO	2026	NBC; Telemundo (DT3)	
Washington, D.C.	District of Columbia	WPXW-TV	2021	Ion	
Washington, D.C.	District of Columbia	WWPX-TV	2021	Ion	(Note: Satellite of WPXW-TV.)
Orlando	Florida	WOPX-TV	2021	Ion	
Miami–Fort Lauderdale	Florida	WSFL-TV	2019	Independent	
Miami–Fort Lauderdale	Florida	WPXM-TV	2021	Ion	
Tallahassee	Florida	WTXL-TV	2019	ABC	
Tampa–St. Petersburg	Florida	WFTS-TV	1986	ABC	
Tampa–St. Petersburg	Florida	WXPX-TV	2021	Independent; Ion (DT2)	
West Palm Beach	Florida	WPTV-TV	1961	NBC	
West Palm Beach	Florida	WFLX	2011	Fox	(Note: Owned by Gray Media.)
West Palm Beach	Florida	WHDT	2019	Independent	
Atlanta	Georgia	WPXA-TV	2021	Ion	
Brunswick	Georgia	WPXC-TV	2021	Ion	
Boise	Idaho	KIVI-TV	2015	ABC; Independent (DT2)	
Twin Falls	Idaho	KSAW-LD	2015	ABC; Independent (DT2)	(Note: Semi-satellite of KIVI-TV.)
Twin Falls	Idaho	KMVT	2026	CBS; Fox (DT3)	
Twin Falls	Idaho	KSVT-CD	2026	Fox	
Chicago	Illinois	WCPX-TV	2021	Ion	
Cedar Rapids–Waterloo	Iowa	KPXR-TV	2021	Ion	
Des Moines	Iowa	KFPX-TV	2021	Ion	
Lexington	Kentucky	WLEX-TV	2019	NBC	
Lexington	Kentucky	WTVQ-DT	2026	ABC	
New Orleans	Louisiana	WPXL-TV	2021	Ion	
Portland	Maine	WIPL	2021	Ion	
Baltimore	Maryland	WMAR-TV	1991	ABC	
Boston	Massachusetts	WBPX-TV	2021	Ion	
Boston	Massachusetts	WDPX-TV	2021	Grit	
Detroit	Michigan	WXYZ-TV	1986	ABC	
Detroit	Michigan	WMYD	2014	Independent	
Grand Rapids–Kalamazoo	Michigan	WXMI	2019	Fox	
Minneapolis–St. Paul	Minnesota	KPXM-TV	2021	Ion	
Kansas City	Missouri	KSHB-TV	1977	NBC	
Kansas City	Missouri	KMCI-TV	2002	Independent	
St. Louis	Missouri	WRBU	2021	Ion	
Billings	Montana	KTVQ	2019	CBS; Independent (DT2)	
Bozeman	Montana	KBZK	2019	CBS; Independent (DT2)	(Note: Satellite of KXLF-TV.)
Butte	Montana	KXLF-TV	2019	CBS; Independent (DT2)	
Great Falls	Montana	KRTV	2019	CBS; Independent (DT2)	
Great Falls	Montana	KTGF-LD	2019	NBC	(Note: Satellite of KTVH.)
Helena	Montana	KXLH-LD	2019	CBS	(Note: Satellite of KRTV.)
Helena	Montana	KTVH-DT	2019	NBC	
Kalispell	Montana	KAJJ-CD	2019	CBS; Independent (DT2)	(Note: Satellite of KPAX.)
Missoula	Montana	KPAX-TV	2019	CBS; Independent (DT2)	
Omaha	Nebraska	KMTV-TV	2015	CBS	
Las Vegas	Nevada	KTNV-TV	2015	ABC	
Las Vegas	Nevada	KMCC	2021	Independent; Ion (DT2)	
Manchester	New Hampshire	WPXG-TV	2021	Ion	(Note: Satellite of WBPX-TV.)
Buffalo	New York	WKBW-TV	2014	ABC	
New York City	New York	WPXN-TV	2021	Ion	
Syracuse	New York	WSPX-TV	2021	Ion	
Raleigh–Durham	North Carolina	WFPX-TV	2021	Bounce	
Raleigh–Durham	North Carolina	WRPX-TV	2021	Ion	
Greenville–New Bern	North Carolina	WEPX-TV	2021	Ion	
Jacksonville	North Carolina	WPXU-TV	2021	Ion	(Note: Satellite of WEPX-TV.)
Cincinnati	Ohio	WCPO-TV **	1949	ABC	
Columbus	Ohio	WSFJ-TV	2021	Bounce	
Cleveland	Ohio	WEWS-TV **	1947	ABC	
Dayton	Ohio	WKOI-TV	2021	Ion	
Tulsa	Oklahoma	KJRH-TV	1971	NBC	
Tulsa	Oklahoma	KTPX-TV	2021	Ion	
Portland	Oregon	KPXG-TV	2021	Ion	
Philadelphia	Pennsylvania	WPPX-TV	2021	Ion	
Pittsburgh	Pennsylvania	WINP-TV	2021	Ion	
Scranton–Wilkes-Barre	Pennsylvania	WQPX-TV	2021	Ion	
Providence	Rhode Island	WPXQ-TV	2021	Ion	
Columbia	South Carolina	WZRB	2021	Ion	
Nashville	Tennessee	WTVF	2015	CBS; Ion (DT2)	
Nashville	Tennessee	WNPX-TV	2021	Independent	
Knoxville	Tennessee	WPXK-TV	2021	Ion	
Bryan–College Station	Texas	KRHD-CD	2019	ABC	(Note: Semi-satellite of KXXV.)
Dallas–Fort Worth	Texas	KPXD-TV	2021	Ion	
Houston	Texas	KPXB-TV	2021	Ion	
Corpus Christi	Texas	KRIS-TV	2019	NBC	
Corpus Christi	Texas	KZTV	2019	CBS	(Note: Owned by SagamoreHill Broadcasting.)
Corpus Christi	Texas	K22JA-D	2019	Telemundo; Independent (DT2)	
Temple–Waco	Texas	KXXV	2019	ABC	
San Antonio	Texas	KPXL-TV	2021	Ion	
Salt Lake City	Utah	KSTU	2019	Fox; Ion (DT2)	
Salt Lake City	Utah	KUPX-TV	2021	Independent; Ion (DT4)	
Norfolk	Virginia	WTKR	2019	CBS	
Norfolk	Virginia	WGNT	2019	Independent	
Richmond	Virginia	WTVR-TV	2019	CBS	
Roanoke	Virginia	WPXR-TV	2021	Ion	
Seattle–Tacoma	Washington	KWPX-TV	2021	Ion	
Charleston–Huntington	West Virginia	WLPX-TV	2021	Ion	
Green Bay	Wisconsin	WGBA-TV	2015	NBC	
Green Bay	Wisconsin	WACY-TV	2015	Independent	
Milwaukee	Wisconsin	WTMJ-TV	2015	NBC	
Milwaukee	Wisconsin	WPXE-TV	2021	Ion	

=== Former stations ===
Stations formerly owned by the E. W. Scripps Company
Media market	State	Station	Purchased	Sold	Notes
Phoenix	Arizona	KMEO	1980	1985	
Phoenix	Arizona	KMEO-FM	1980	1985	
Tucson	Arizona	KFFN	2015	2018	
Tucson	Arizona	KMXZ-FM	2015	2018	
Tucson	Arizona	KQTH	2015	2018	
Tucson	Arizona	KTGV	2015	2018	
San Francisco	California	KCNS	2002	2006	(Note: Former Shop at Home owned-and-operated station.)
Fort Myers–Naples	Florida	WFTX-TV	2015	2026	
Indianapolis	Indiana	WRTV	2011	2026	
Boise	Idaho	KJOT	2015	2018	
Boise	Idaho	KQXR	2015	2018	
Boise	Idaho	KRVB	2015	2018	
Boise	Idaho	KTHI	2015	2018	
Lafayette	Louisiana	KATC	2019	2026	
Wichita	Kansas	KFDI-FM	2015	2018	
Wichita	Kansas	KFTI	2015	2018	
Wichita	Kansas	KFXJ	2015	2018	
Wichita	Kansas	KICT-FM	2015	2018	
Wichita	Kansas	KYQQ	2015	2018	
Baltimore	Maryland	WBSB-FM	1980	1993	
Boston	Massachusetts	WMFP	2002	2007	
Lansing	Michigan	WHTV	2014	2017	(Note: Owned by Venture Technologies Group.)
Lansing	Michigan	WSYM-TV	2015	2026	
Springfield	Missouri	KRVI	2015	2018	
Springfield	Missouri	KSGF	2015	2018	
Springfield	Missouri	KSGF-FM	2015	2018	
Springfield	Missouri	KSPW	2015	2018	
Springfield	Missouri	KTTS-FM	2015	2018	
Omaha	Nebraska	KEZO-FM	2015	2018	
Omaha	Nebraska	KKCD	2015	2018	
Omaha	Nebraska	KQCH	2015	2018	
Omaha	Nebraska	KSRZ	2015	2018	
Omaha	Nebraska	KXSP	2015	2018	
New York	New York	WPIX	2019	2020	
New York	New York	WSAH	2002	2007	
Raleigh–Durham	North Carolina	WRAY-TV	2002	2006	
Cincinnati	Ohio	WCPO	1935	1966	
Cincinnati	Ohio	WCPO-FM**	1949	1966	
Cleveland	Ohio	WEWS-FM**	1947	1950	
Cleveland	Ohio	WOAC-TV	2002	2006	
Tulsa	Oklahoma	KBEZ	2015	2018	
Tulsa	Oklahoma	KHTT	2015	2018	
Tulsa	Oklahoma	KFAQ	2015	2018	
Tulsa	Oklahoma	KVOO-FM	2015	2018	
Tulsa	Oklahoma	KXBL	2015	2018	
Portland	Oregon	KUPL	1981	1993	
Portland	Oregon	KUPL-FM	1981	1993	
Memphis	Tennessee	WMC	1937	1993	
Memphis	Tennessee	WMC-FM**	1947	1993	
Memphis	Tennessee	WMC-TV **	1948	1993	
Memphis	Tennessee	WMPS	1937	1944	
Knoxville	Tennessee	WCYQ	2015	2018	
Knoxville	Tennessee	WKHT	2015	2018	
Knoxville	Tennessee	WNOX	1935	1982	
Knoxville	Tennessee	WNOX	2015	2018	
Knoxville	Tennessee	WWST	2015	2018	
San Antonio	Texas	KENS	1997	1997	(Note: Operated by third parties.)
San Antonio	Texas	KENS-TV	1997	1997	
Milwaukee	Wisconsin	WKTI	2015	2018	
Milwaukee	Wisconsin	WTMJ	2015	2018	

== National Spelling Bee ==
Scripps also operates the national (US) spelling bee. The final competition is in Washington, DC, and it is broadcast on Ion Television and Bounce TV. Lower levels are organized by the school, then county and eventually to the final competition.

== See also ==
- Edward W. Scripps
- Ellen Browning Scripps
- James E. Scripps
- Charles Scripps
- Scripps News
- Scripps Networks
- Scripps Howard Foundation
- Scripps Howard Awards
- Scripps Ranch
- Edward W. Estlow
- Scripps Networks Interactive

== Sources ==
- Baldasty, Gerald J. (January 1, 1999). E.W. Scripps and the Business of Newspapers. Champaign, Illinois: University of Illinois Press. p. [https://archive.org/details/ewscrippsbusi00bald/page/83 83. ISBN 0-252-02255-6.
- McRae, Milton Alexander (1924). Forty Years in Newspaperdom: The Autobiography of a Newspaper Man. New York City: Brentano's – via HathiTrust.
- Scripps, Edward Willis (1926). Gardner, Gilson (ed.). History of the Scripps Concern. Archived from the original on November 29, 2014.
