= MKE =

MKE may refer to:

- Milwaukee, a city in Wisconsin, United States
  - Milwaukee Intermodal Station; Amtrak station code MKE
  - Milwaukee Mitchell International Airport, IATA airport code MKE
  - Ascent MKE, high-rise building in Milwaukee
  - MKE (tabloid), a weekly publication in Milwaukee (2004–2008)
- MKE Ankaragücü, a Turkish football club in Ankara
- MKE Kırıkkalespor, a Turkish football club in Kirikkale
- Mechanical and Chemical Industry Corporation (Turkey), in Turkish, Makina ve Kimya Endustrisi Kurumu
- MKE (for Matsushita Kotobuki Electronics), an obsolete Panasonic CD interface
- South Korean Ministry of Knowledge Economy (MKE), now the Ministry of Trade, Industry and Energy
