= KFXJ =

Classic rock radio station in Augusta–Wichita, Kansas

- Augusta, Kansas; United States
- Broadcast area: Wichita, Kansas
- Frequency: 104.5 MHz (HD Radio)
- Branding: Classic Rock 104.5

Programming
- Format: Classic rock
- Affiliations: ABC Audio

Ownership
- Owner: SummitMedia; (SM-KFXJ, LLC)
- Sister stations: KFDI-FM; KICT-FM; KFKB; KYQQ

History
- First air date: 1992 (as KLLS)
- Former call signs: KQUI (CP, May–September 1991); KLLS (1991–2000)
- Call sign meaning: "Fox" (former branding)

Technical information
- Licensing authority: FCC
- Facility ID: 37133
- Class: C2
- ERP: 45,000 watts
- HAAT: 157 meters
- Transmitter coordinates: 37°48′15″N 97°15′56″W

Links
- Public license information: Public file; LMS
- Webcast: Listen live
- Website: www.classicrock1045.fm

KFXJ (104.5 FM) is a radio station broadcasting a classic rock music format. Licensed to serve Augusta, Kansas, United States, the station serves the Wichita, Kansas, area. The station is owned by SummitMedia and features programming from ABC Radio. Its studios are located in Wichita and its transmitter is located in Kechi, Kansas.

== History ==
After being issued a construction permit in May 1991 as KQUI, the station signed on the air April 1, 1992, as "Wichita's Class FM 104.5" KLLS, with a hybrid soft rock/crossover country format called "Natural Sound". In early 1993, the branding changed to "KLLS 104.5" followed later that year by "Variety 104.5". On December 22, 1994, the station was branded "Star 104.5", and changed to an all-1970s hits format. By 1999, it shifted to classic rock, branded as "104.5 The Fox". The KFXJ call sign would be adopted on May 5, 2000.

On July 30, 2014, it was announced that the E. W. Scripps Company would acquire Journal Communications in an all-stock transaction. The combined firm retained their broadcast properties and spun off their print assets as Journal Media Group. KFXJ, their sister radio stations in the Wichita area and two TV stations were not initially included in the merger; in September, Journal filed to transfer these stations to Journal/Scripps Divestiture Trust (with Kiel Media Group as trustee). Scripps exited radio in 2018; the Wichita stations went to SummitMedia in a four-market, $47 million deal completed on November 1, 2018.

On December 20, 2022, KFXJ rebranded as "Classic Rock 104.5".
