= Journal Media Group =

Newspaper publishing company

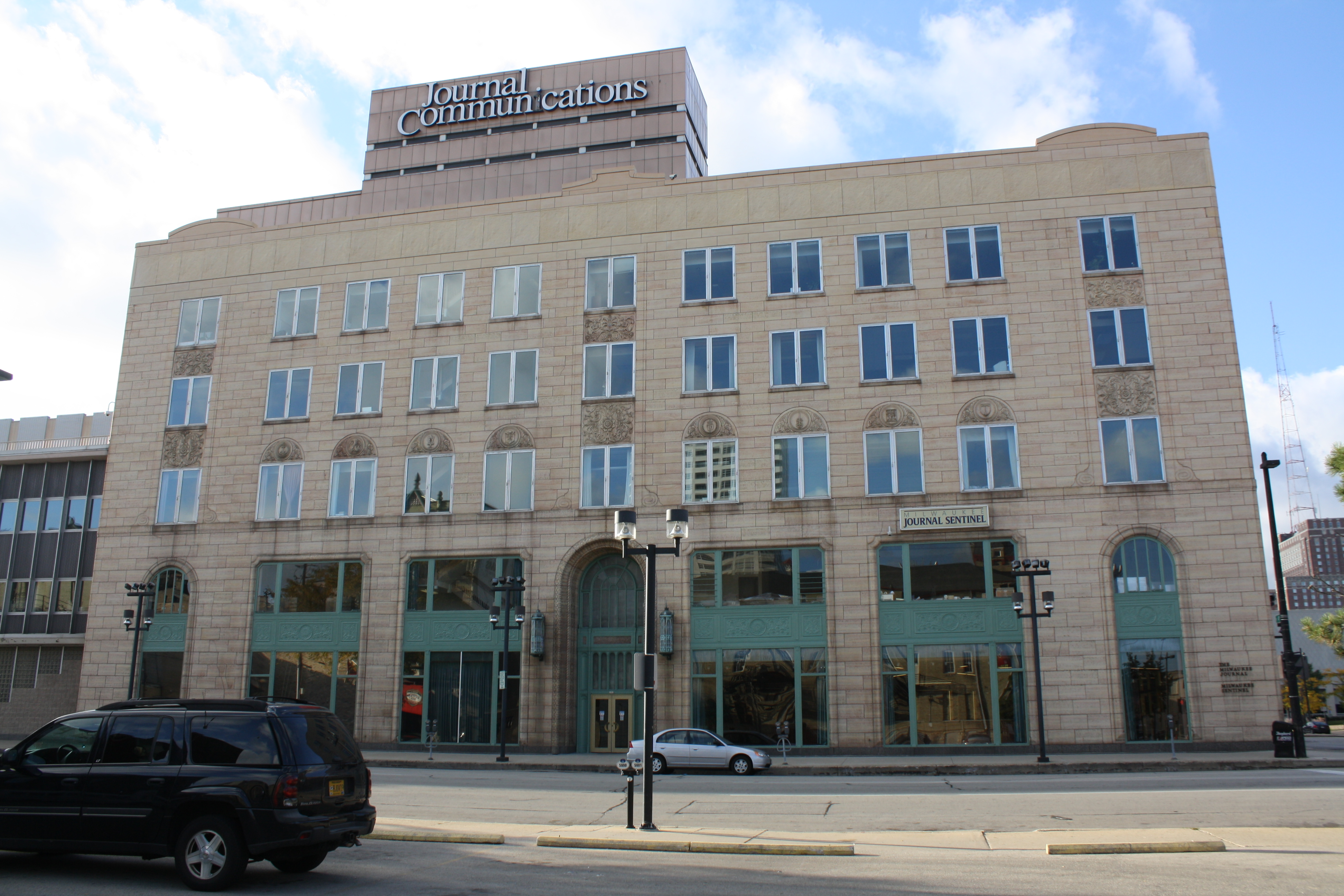
- Journal Communications building, Milwaukee, 2012; building since converted to the residential Journal Commons
- Formerly: The Journal Company; Journal Communications
- Type: Public
- Traded as: NYSE: JMG
- Industry: Media
- Founded: 1882; 144 years ago
- Defunct: April 8, 2016; 10 years ago
- Fate: Acquired by Gannett; Broadcast assets acquired by E. W. Scripps Company
- Successor: Gannett Company; E. W. Scripps Company
- Headquarters: Milwaukee, Wisconsin, United States
- Area served: Nationwide
- Key people: Timothy E. Stautberg (CEO); Stephen J. Smith (Chairman)
- Revenue: $400 million (2012)
- Operating income: $60 million (2012)
- Net income: $33.3 million (2012)
- Total assets: $625.8 million (2012)
- Total equity: $205.5 million (2012)

Journal Media Group (formerly Journal Communications) was a Milwaukee, Wisconsin–based newspaper publishing company. The company's roots were first established in 1882 as the owner of its namesake, the Milwaukee Journal, and expanded into broadcasting with the establishment of WTMJ radio and WTMJ-TV, and the acquisition of other television and radio stations.

On April 1, 2015, the E. W. Scripps Company acquired Journal Communications, and spun out the publishing operations of both Scripps and Journal into a new company known as Journal Media Group. It is led by Timothy E. Stautberg—the former head of Scripps' newspaper business, joined by previous Journal CEO Stephen J. Smith as a chairman. In 2016, Journal Media Group was acquired by Gannett.

== History ==
The Milwaukee Journal was started in 1882, in competition with four other English-language, four German- and two Polish-language dailies. It launched WTMJ-AM (620) in 1927, and WTMJ-TV (Channel 4) in 1947. The Journal Company, until then primarily owned by local interests, introduced an employee stock trust plan in 1937, and as a result most Journal stock was eventually held by its employees (under certain restrictions). A small bloc of Journal stock was given to Harvard to fund the Nieman Fellowship program for promising journalists, and another bloc was still held by the original owning families until the IPO.

The Milwaukee Sentinel, begun in 1837 as a weekly published by city co-founder Solomon Juneau, passed through the hands of several owners before being sold to the Hearst Corporation in 1924. Hearst operated the Sentinel until 1962, when, following a long and costly strike, it abruptly announced the closing of the paper. Although Hearst claimed that the paper had lost money for years, The Journal Company, concerned about the loss of an important voice (and facing questions about its own dominance of the Milwaukee media market), agreed to buy the Sentinel name, subscription lists, and goodwill associated with the name. In 1995 the Journal and Sentinel were consolidated. The new Journal Sentinel then became a seven-day morning paper. In 1964, Journal Communications bought a part interest in Perry Printing, a commercial printer specializing in printing magazines, catalogs and free-standing inserts for publications. A decade later, in 1974, it purchased the remaining shares of the company. In 1995, it sold the operation (which by then had about 1000 employees and sales of $123 million) to the Milhous Group of California.

Former logo of the company

In 1968, the Midwestern Relay cable transmission division of the Journal Company was developed out of broadcast-related expertise; in 1991, Midwestern Relay acquired Norlight, a fiber-optic private carrier, and adopted the Norlight name. On February 26, 2007, Journal Communications sold the regional telecommunications provider to privately held Q-Comm Corp of Delaware. Upon closing the transaction, Q-Comm terminated Jim Ditter, who had been president of Norlight since 1995, and chief financial officer Phillip Garvey. What is now known as the Journal Community Publishing Group began in Waupaca, Wisconsin, in 1972 as a publishing and printing company called Add Inc. A majority interest was purchased by Journal Communications in 1981, and the remainder in 1986. In June 2007, Journal Communications sold off its JCP interests in Louisiana, Ohio, Connecticut and Vermont. The sales brought in a combined $30 million.

The company sold 11 community newspapers, five shoppers and two printing plants in Connecticut and Vermont to Hersam Acorn Newspapers. In Ohio, Journal sold eight shoppers, numerous specialty print products and the Advantage Press commercial printing business to Gannett Company. It also sold its Louisiana-based publishing business to a Target Media Partners affiliate. In 1999 Journal Communications acquired the Great Empire radio group (13 radio stations in 4 states). The corporation had its initial public offering of Class A shares in 2003. For decades, Journal Communications was criticized with concerns about being a media monopoly in the Milwaukee area. It created the now-defunct alternative papers MKE and ¡Aqui! Milwaukee to regain advertising dollars lost to local independents like the Shepherd Express and the Milwaukee Spanish Journal.

=== As Journal Media Group ===
On July 30, 2014, it was announced that Journal would be acquired by the E. W. Scripps Company in an all-stock transaction. Scripps would retain the two firms' broadcasting properties, while both the Scripps and Journal print properties would be spun off as Journal Media Group. The FCC approved the deal on December 12, 2014, and it was approved by shareholders on March 11, 2015. The merger and spin-off were finalized on April 1, 2015; Stephen J. Smith was replaced as CEO by Timothy E. Stautberg—the former head of Scripps' newspaper operation. Although Journal Media Group was based at Journal Communications' old headquarters in Milwaukee, the latter company was legally defunct, having been absorbed into Scripps and renamed "Desk BC Merger, LLC".

On October 7, 2015, it was announced that Gannett would acquire Journal Media Group for $280 million. The deal was finalized on April 8, 2016.

== Former assets ==
=== Newspapers ===
- Milwaukee Journal Sentinel (Milwaukee, Wisconsin)
- Ventura County Star (Camarillo, California)
- Redding Record Searchlight (Redding, California)
- Naples Daily News (Naples, Florida)
- Treasure Coast Newspapers:
  - The Stuart News (Stuart, Florida)
  - Indian River Press Journal (Vero Beach, Florida)
  - The St. Lucie News-Tribune (Fort Pierce, Florida)
- Evansville Courier & Press (Evansville, Indiana)
- The Gleaner (Henderson, Kentucky)
- The Anderson Independent-Mail (Anderson, South Carolina)
- The Knoxville News-Sentinel (Knoxville, Tennessee)
- The Commercial Appeal (Memphis, Tennessee)
- The Abilene Reporter-News (Abilene, Texas)
- Corpus Christi Caller-Times (Corpus Christi, Texas)
- San Angelo Standard-Times (San Angelo, Texas)
- Times Record News (Wichita Falls, Texas)
- Kitsap Sun (Bremerton, Washington) (daily newspaper)

=== Community Publishing Group ===
Florida

- Clay Today, Orange Park
- Clay County Leader, Clay County
- Ponte Vedra Recorder, Ponte Vedra Beach
- St. John's Recorder, Fruit Cove

Wisconsin

- The Bay Viewer, Milwaukee
- Brookfield News, Brookfield
- Clintonville Tribune-Gazette, Clintonville
- Cudahy-St. Francis Reminder-Enterprise, Cudahy
- Elm Grove Elm Leaves, Elm Grove
- Franklin Hub, Franklin
- Germantown Banner-Press, Germantown
- Greendale Village Life, Greendale
- Greenfield Observer, Greenfield
- Hales Corners Village Hub, Hales Corners
- Iola Herald, Iola
- Kettle Moraine Index, Dousman
- Lake Country Reporter, Hartland
- Manawa Advocate, Manawa
- Merrill Foto News, Merrill
- Menomonee Falls News, Menomonee Falls
- Mequon-Thiensville Courant, Mequon
- Mukwonago Chief, Mukwonago
- Muskego Sun, Muskego
- New Berlin Citizen, New Berlin
- New London Press Star, New London
- North Shore Herald, Fox Point
- The North Star Journal, Rhinelander
- Oak Creek Pictorial, Oak Creek
- Oconomowoc Focus, Oconomowoc
- South Milwaukee Voice Graphic, South Milwaukee
- Sussex Sun, Sussex
- Wauwatosa News-Times, Wauwatosa
- West Allis Star, West Allis

=== Other holdings ===
- IPC Print Services
- PrimeNet

=== Television stations ===
Stations are arranged alphabetically by city of license.

- (**) – Indicates station was built and signed on by Journal.

Media market	State	Station	Purchased	Sold	Notes
Tucson–Sierra Vista	Arizona	KGUN-TV	2005	2015	
Tucson–Sierra Vista	Arizona	KWBA-TV	2008	2015	
Palm Springs	California	KMIR-TV	1999	2014	
Palm Springs	California	KPSE-LP	2008	2014	
Cape Coral–Fort Myers–Naples	Florida	WFTX-TV	2005	2015	
Boise–Caldwell–Nampa	Idaho	KIVI-TV	2002	2015	
Boise–Caldwell–Nampa	Idaho	KNIN-TV	2009	2015	
Twin Falls	Idaho	KSAW-LD	2002	2015	(Note: Semi-satellite of KIVI-TV.)
Lansing	Michigan	WSYM-TV	1985	2015	
Omaha	Nebraska	KMTV-TV	2007	2015	
Las Vegas	Nevada	KTNV-TV	1979	2015	
Nashville	Tennessee	WTVF	2012	2015	
Green Bay–Appleton	Wisconsin	WGBA-TV	2004	2015	
Green Bay–Appleton	Wisconsin	WACY-TV	2012	2015	(Note: Operated by Journal Media Group from 2004 to 2012.)
Sturgeon Bay	Wisconsin	WLWK-CD	2004	2015	(Note: Translator of WGBA-TV.)
Milwaukee	Wisconsin	WTMJ-TV **	1947	2015	

=== Radio stations ===
- (**) – Indicates station was built and signed on by Journal.

AM Station	FM Station

City of license / Market	Station	Years owned	Current status
Boise, ID	KGEM 1140	1998–2009	Owned by Salt & Light Radio
Boise, ID	KSRV 1380	1998–2000	Defunct, ceased operations in 2019 as KBXN
Boise, ID	KCID 1490	1998–2009	Owned by Salt & Light Radio
Boise, ID	KRVB 94.9	–2015	Owned by Lotus Communications
Boise, ID	KSRV-FM 96.1	1998–2000	Owned by Iliad Media Group
Boise, ID	KQXR 100.3	1998–2015	Owned by Lotus Communications
Boise, ID	KJOR/KJOT 105.1	1998–2015	Owned by Lotus Communications
Boise, ID	KCID-FM/KTHI 107.1	1998–2015	Owned by Lotus Communications
Kansas City, MO	KCWV/KRVK/KQRC-FM 98.9	1989–1997	Owned by Audacy, Inc.
Knoxville, TN	WQBB/WKTI 1040	1998–2012	WJBE, owned by Joe E. Armstrong
Knoxville, TN	WWST/WMYU/WCYQ/ WNOX 93.1	1997–2015	Owned by SummitMedia
Knoxville, TN	WNOX/WCYQ 100.3	2013–2015	Owned by SummitMedia
Knoxville, TN	WMYU/WWST 102.1	1997–2015	Owned by SummitMedia
Knoxville, TN	WQBB-FM/WQIX/ WBON/WKHT 104.5	1998–2015	Owned by SummitMedia
Milwaukee, WI	WTMJ 620	1927–2015	Owned by Good Karma Brands
Milwaukee, WI	WTMJ-FM/WKTI-FM/ WLWK-FM 94.5 **	1959–2015	WKTI, owned by Good Karma Brands
Omaha, NE	WOW/KOMJ/KXSP 590	1998–2015	WOW, owned by Steven Seline
Omaha, NE	KBBX/KHLP 1420	1998–2005	KXCB, owned by Steven Seline
Omaha, NE	KEZO/KOSR/KOMJ 1490	1995–2005	KIBM, owned by Steven Seline
Omaha, NE	KEZO-FM 92.3	1995–2015	Owned by SummitMedia
Omaha, NE	WOW-FM/KSSO/KMXM/ KQCH 94.1	1998–2015	Owned by SummitMedia
Omaha, NE	KOSJ/KEZY/KQCH/ KBBX-FM 97.7	1996–2006	Owned by Flood Communications
Omaha, NE	KSRZ 104.5	1998–2015	Owned by SummitMedia
Omaha, NE	KKCD 105.9	1995–2015	Owned by SummitMedia
Springfield, MO	KTTS/KTTF/KSGF 1260	1998–2015	Owned by SummitMedia
Springfield, MO	KTTS-FM 94.7	1998–2015	Owned by SummitMedia
Springfield, MO	KLTQ/KMXH/KSPW 96.5	1998–2015	Owned by SummitMedia
Springfield, MO	KZRQ/KSGF-FM 104.1	1999–2015	Owned by SummitMedia
Springfield, MO	KRVI 106.7	1999–2015	Owned by SummitMedia
Tucson, AZ	KNND/KFFN 1490	1995–2018	Owned by Lotus Communications
Tucson, AZ	KMXZ-FM 94.9	1995–2015	Owned by Lotus Communications
Tucson, AZ	KKHJ/KZPT/KQTH 104.1 **	1994–2015	KFLT-FM, owned by Family Life Broadcasting
Tucson, AZ	KLQB/KIXD/KGMG/ KTGV 106.3	1998–2015	Owned by Bustos Media
Tulsa, OK	KVOO/KFAQ 1170	1998–2015	KOTV, owned by Griffin Communications
Tulsa, OK	KBEZ 92.9	2012–2015	KRQV, owned by Griffin Communications
Tulsa, OK	KVOO-FM 98.5	1998–2015	KXBL, owned by Griffin Communications
Tulsa, OK	KCKI/KXBL 99.5	1998–2015	KVOO-FM, owned by Griffin Communications
Tulsa, OK	KHTT 106.9	2012–2015	Owned by Griffin Communications
Wichita, KS	KFDI/KFTI/KLIO 1070	1998–2015	KFKB, owned by SummitMedia
Wichita, KS	KMXW/KFTI-FM 92.3	1999–2015	KKGQ, owned by Union Broadcasting
Wichita, KS	KICT-FM 95.1	1998–2015	Owned by SummitMedia
Wichita, KS	KFDI-FM 101.3	1998–2015	Owned by SummitMedia
Wichita, KS	KLLS/KFXJ 104.5	1998–2015	Owned by SummitMedia
Wichita, KS	KYQQ 106.5	1998–2015	Owned by SummitMedia
Wausau, WI	WSAU 550	1985–1996	Owned by Midwest Communications
Wausau, WI	WSAU 1400	1947–1951	WRIG (1390 AM), owned by Midwest Communications
Wausau, WI	WSAU-FM 95.5 **	1947–1950	Defunct, ceased operations in 1950
Wausau, WI	WIFC 95.5	1985–1996	Owned by Midwest Communications

== Controversies ==
Before its merger with Journal, the papers of E. W. Scripps were known for having several controversies within the newspapers it ran.

Hugo Zacchini performed a human cannonball act in 1972 at the Geauga County Fair in Burton, Ohio. Scripps television station WEWS-TV recorded and aired the entire act against his wishes and without compensating him, as was required by Ohio law. In Zacchini v. Scripps-Howard Broadcasting Co., the U.S. Supreme Court ruled that the First Amendment did not shield the broadcaster from liability from common law copyright claims.

The Commercial Appeal posted a controversial database listing Tennessee residents with permits to carry handguns in 2008. The database is a public record in Tennessee, but had not previously been posted online.

Scripps owns and operates the Ventura County Star, which has faced many complaints involving its circulation practices rather than its editorial content. As of April 2, 2011, the Better Business Bureau listed ten (10) separate "significant" complaints from the previous three years, of which two alleged the company made unauthorized debits from customers' checking accounts, four alleged problems obtaining refunds, two alleged the company harassed a customer or former customer, two alleged improper billing, and two alleged delivery continuing after customers tried to cancel. (The total number of allegations does not add to the total number of complaints because two complaints made multiple allegations.)

In May 2013, Scripps News Service discovered and published a security breach on the websites of Oklahoma-based TerraCom Inc. and an affiliate, YourTel America Inc. in which the personal information of tens of thousands of low-income Americans was publicly exposed. In response, the two companies accused Scripps of "hacking" and of violations of the Computer Fraud and Abuse Act. The Illinois Attorney General Lisa Madigan subsequently announced an investigation into the two companies.

== Board of directors ==
- Steven J. Smith – Chairman of the Board and Chief Executive Officer, Journal Communications
- David Drury – President & Chief Executive Officer, Poblocki Sign Company, LLC
- David Meissner – Former Chairman, Public Policy Forum, Inc.
- Jonathan Newcomb – Senior Advisor, Coady Diemar Partners
- Roger Peirce – Retired Vice Chairman & CEO, Super Steel Products Corporation
- Ellen Siminoff – CEO, Shmoop, and Chairman, Efficient Frontier
- Mary Ellen Stanek – Managing Director & Chief Investment Officer, Baird Advisors, Robert W. Baird & Co. Inc
- Owen Sullivan – CEO, Right Management
- Jeanette Tully – President and CEO, Radiovisa Corporation
