= KICT =

KICT may refer to:

- KICT-FM, a radio station (95.1 FM) licensed to Wichita, Kansas, United States
- The ICAO code for Wichita Dwight D. Eisenhower National Airport
- Karachi International Container Terminal, Pakistan
