= Hersam Acorn Newspapers =

Family-owned weekly newspaper company based in Ridgefield, Connecticut

- Company type: Private
- Industry: Newspapers
- Founded: 1997; 29 years ago
- Headquarters: Ridgefield, Connecticut
- Key people: Martin Hersam, COO; Thomas Nash, publisher
- Products: Weekly newspapers in Connecticut; Shoppers
- Website: www.hersamacorn.com

Hersam Acorn Newspapers was a family-owned weekly newspaper company based in Ridgefield, Connecticut, United States. The company published 19 weeklies in Fairfield and New Haven counties, Connecticut, and Westchester County, New York, and several shopper publications in Connecticut, Massachusetts, New York and Vermont.

Hersam Acorn was founded in 1997 after the merger of the Hersam Publishing Company, founded in 1908, with Acorn Press, founded in 1937. In September 2007, the company made its largest acquisition to date, buying the former Hometown Publications and Trumbull Printing, founded in 1959, from Journal Communications, which had purchased them in 1979.

In October 2018, Hearst Communications announced that it had acquired the print and digital assets of seven weekly newspaper brands from Hersam Acorn in Fairfield County, Connecticut, including The Ridgefield Press, The Wilton Bulletin, New Canaan Advertiser, The Darien Times, The Shelton Herald, The Trumbull Times, and The Milford Mirror. Those Hersam Acorn papers are now part of Hearst Connecticut Media Group.

== Properties ==
The original eight Hersam Acorn newspapers are all broadsheets and publish on Thursday. Following the Hometown acquisition, Hersam Acorn redesigned its 11 newest papers and said it would give them a local focus. Hersam Acorn newspapers in late 2007 (with weekly circulation in parentheses) were:

- Amity Observer of Orange, Connecticut (8,582—from Hometown; also covers Bethany and Woodbridge)
- Bridgeport News of Bridgeport, Connecticut (9,874—from Hometown)
- The Darien Times of Darien, Connecticut (6,454)
- Easton Courier of Easton, Connecticut (1,601—from Hometown)
- Fairfield Today of Fairfield, Connecticut (6,362—from Hometown)
- Greenwich Post of Greenwich, Connecticut (14,901—acquired in 2003)
- Lewisboro Ledger of Lewisboro, New York (2,201)
- Milford Mirror of Milford, Connecticut (14,542—from Hometown)
- Monroe Courier of Monroe, Connecticut (3,783)
- New Canaan Advertiser of New Canaan, Connecticut (6,815—founded in 1908)
- The Redding Pilot of Redding, Connecticut (2,566)
- The Ridgefield Press of Ridgefield, Connecticut (7,296—oldest paper in the chain, established in 1875)
- Shelton Herald of Shelton, Connecticut (5,666—from Hometown)
- Stratford Star of Stratford, Connecticut (14,719—from Hometown)
- Trumbull Times of Trumbull, Connecticut (6,520—from Hometown)
- Valley/Oxford Gazette of Derby, Connecticut (17,626—from Hometown; also covers Ansonia, Oxford and Seymour)
- The Weston Forum of Weston, Connecticut (4,103)
- The Wilton Bulletin of Wilton, Connecticut (3,406)
