= KICT-FM =

- Wichita, Kansas; United States
- Broadcast area: Wichita, Kansas
- Frequency: 95.1 MHz
- Branding: T-95

Programming
- Format: Active rock
- Affiliations: United Stations Radio Networks

Ownership
- Owner: SummitMedia; (SM-KICT, LLC)
- Sister stations: KFDI-FM; KFKB; KFXJ; KYQQ

History
- First air date: April 26, 1972
- Call sign meaning: ICAO code for Wichita Dwight D. Eisenhower National Airport

Technical information
- Licensing authority: FCC
- Facility ID: 63548
- Class: C1
- ERP: 100,000 watts
- HAAT: 274 meters (899 ft)
- Transmitter coordinates: 37.799°N 97.533°W

Links
- Public license information: Public file; LMS
- Webcast: Listen live
- Website: www.t95.com

KICT-FM (95.1 MHz) is a radio station in Wichita, Kansas, broadcasting an active rock format. The station is owned by SummitMedia. Its studios are in Wichita and the transmitter is located outside Colwich, Kansas.

== History ==
KICT signed on April 26, 1972, as a country music station. It would adopt its rock format on January 24, 1979, with the first song being "Rock & Roll Band" by Boston.

On July 30, 2014, it was announced that the E. W. Scripps Company would acquire Journal Communications in an all-stock transaction. The combined firm retained their broadcast properties and spun off their print assets as Journal Media Group. KICT-FM, its sister radio stations in the Wichita area and two TV stations were not initially included in the merger; in September, Journal filed to transfer these stations to Journal/Scripps Divestiture Trust (with Kiel Media Group as trustee). Scripps exited radio in 2018; the Wichita stations went to SummitMedia in a four-market, $47 million deal completed on November 1, 2018.
