= Naples Daily News =

Daily newspaper in Naples, Florida

- Type: Daily newspaper
- Format: Broadsheet
- Owner: USA Today Co.
- Publisher: William R. Barker
- Founded: 1923
- Headquarters: 1100 Immokalee Road, Naples, FL 34110 United States
- Circulation: 12,954 Average print circulation 1,769 Digital Subscribers
- Website: naplesnews.com

The Naples Daily News is the main daily newspaper of Naples, Florida, and Collier County. It is owned by USA Today Co..

It was previously owned by Milwaukee-based Journal Media Group, which was formed by a newspaper-only spin-off of E.W. Scripps Company's media operations in 2015. Scripps had bought it from the founding Collier family in 1986. At that time, Scripps paid the highest multiple of earnings for the paper any American company had paid to date, in a deal said to be over $160 million.

The Naples Daily News and The (Fort Myers, Florida) News-Press papers are both printed at Stuart.

For many years, the Naples Daily News has targeted Collier County. However, its coverage has been expanded to Lee County and parts of Charlotte County. The paper publishes several editions of its "Local & State" section for communities including Bonita Springs, Cape Coral, East Naples, Fort Myers, Immokalee, Lehigh Acres, Marco Island, North Fort Myers, North Naples and South Fort Myers.

The president and publisher is William R. Barker.
