= KSPW =

- Sparta, Missouri; United States
- Broadcast area: Springfield, Missouri
- Frequency: 96.5 MHz
- Branding: Power 96.5

Programming
- Format: Contemporary hit radio

Ownership
- Owner: SummitMedia; (SM-KSPW, LLC)
- Sister stations: KRVI; KSGF-FM; KTTS-FM

History
- First air date: February 21, 1988
- Former call signs: KJLR (1988); KLTQ (1988–1999)
- Call sign meaning: Kreating Springfield's Power

Technical information
- Licensing authority: FCC
- Facility ID: 10119
- Class: C2
- ERP: 50,000 watts
- HAAT: 150 meters
- Transmitter coordinates: 36°57′16″N 93°17′22″W

Links
- Public license information: Public file; LMS
- Webcast: Listen live
- Website: www.power965.com

KSPW (96.5 FM) is a radio station broadcasting a contemporary hit radio format. It is licensed to Sparta, Missouri, United States, and serves Springfield, Missouri. The station is owned by SummitMedia.

== Station history ==
KSPW debuted on the air on February 21, 1988, as KJLR. By July 1988, it adopted an adult contemporary format as KLTQ under the branding "Q96". KLTQ changed to a hot country music format on January 18, 1992. KLTQ subsequently switched to a soft rock format and then changed to a format referred to as "maximum country" in March 1996. The station changed its call sign to KMXH in 1999. On March 23, 2001, KMXH switched to a rhythmic contemporary hits format. The station subsequently adopted the KSPW calls. The station patterned its rhythmic contemporary format after sister station KQCH in Omaha. On August 29, 2012, KSPW received competition from KOSP, which replaced a classic hits format with a competing rhythmic CHR as "92.9 The Beat".

Journal Communications and the E. W. Scripps Company announced on July 30, 2014, that the two companies would merge to create a new broadcast company under the E.W. Scripps Company name that owned the two companies' broadcast properties, including KSPW. The transaction was completed in 2015, pending shareholder and regulatory approvals. Scripps exited radio in 2018; the Springfield stations went to SummitMedia in a four-market, $47 million deal completed on November 1, 2018.

== DJs ==
- Mornings: Fotsch and Sarah
- Middays & Afternoons: The Ginge
