= KRVI =

- Mount Vernon, Missouri; United States
- Broadcast area: Springfield, Missouri
- Frequency: 106.7 MHz
- Branding: Classic Rock 106.7

Programming
- Format: Classic rock

Ownership
- Owner: SummitMedia; (SM-KRVI, LLC)
- Sister stations: KSGF-FM; KSPW; KTTS-FM

History
- First air date: 1993 (as KELE)
- Former call signs: KTJA (1989–1993, CP); KELE (1993–1994); KHTO (1994–2003); KZRQ-FM (2003–2009)

Technical information
- Licensing authority: FCC
- Facility ID: 55165
- Class: C3
- ERP: 19,000 watts
- HAAT: 115 meters (377 ft)
- Transmitter coordinates: 37.154°N 93.616°W

Links
- Public license information: Public file; LMS
- Webcast: Listen live
- Website: www.classicrock1067.fm

KRVI (106.7 FM) is a radio station broadcasting a classic rock format. It is licensed to Mount Vernon, Missouri, United States, and serves the Springfield area. The station is owned by SummitMedia.

== History ==
The station first aired in August 1994 as KHTO "Hot 106.7" "Springfield's Hottest Hits" and aired a Top 40 (CHR) format. The station also used to be KZRQ, known as Z106.7 (previously Channel Z-104.1 Rock This) and had an active rock format. Prior to that, the station was KHTO 106.7 The End "Music For All People".

Journal Communications and the E. W. Scripps Company announced on July 30, 2014, that the two companies would merge to create a new broadcast company under the E.W. Scripps Company name that owned the two companies' broadcast properties, including KRVI. The transaction was completed in 2015, pending shareholder and regulatory approvals. Scripps exited radio in 2018; the Springfield stations went to SummitMedia in a four-market, $47 million deal completed on November 1, 2018.

On October 28, 2020, KRVI dropped its "The River" adult hits format and began stunting with Christmas music, branded as "Santa 106.7". It returned to "The River" branding after Christmas.

On February 12, 2024, KRVI changed its format from adult hits to classic rock, branded as "Classic Rock 106.7".
