= MKE (tabloid) =

Weekly tabloid based in Wisconsin

- Type: weekly tabloid
- Owner: Journal Communications
- Editor: Diane Bacha
- Language: English
- Headquarters: Milwaukee, Wisconsin
- Price: free
- Website: http://www.mkeonline.com/

MKE was a weekly publication in Milwaukee, Wisconsin published by Journal Communications. Launched on October 28, 2004 as a zero-news-content cross between an alternative weekly and a weekly entertainment magazine aimed at readers under 35, it (along with the online version, MKEOnline.com) also served as a secondary advertising vehicle for the Milwaukee Journal Sentinel, its parent publication, and mainly re-printed content originally compiled for Cue, its entertainment, features and arts section. At the time of its launch, it was seen as competing for the same readership as the Shepherd Express.

A representative for the Association of Alternative Newsweeklies (of which the Shepherd Express was a member) was quoted as saying that three dozen daily newspapers had rolled out weekly free publications during the past year alone. He characterized them as "usually pretty fluffy" and presented with "faux hipness," and said of MKE: "Milwaukee's a little different because they've actually come out and said there's no news at all," and predicted most of the new free newspapers would fail in the long run because they lacked the "idiosyncrasies and oddball charm" of true alternative weeklies.

Described by local reporter and media critic Michael Horne as "pretty darn lame", it never found a profitable marketing niche; ad revenues peaked in 2006 and never recovered. MKE ceased publication after the July 11, 2008, issue.
