= KTTS-FM =

- Springfield, Missouri; United States
- Broadcast area: Springfield, Missouri; Branson, Missouri
- Frequency: 94.7 MHz
- Branding: 94.7 KTTS

Programming
- Format: Country
- Affiliations: Fox News Radio

Ownership
- Owner: SummitMedia; (SM-KTTS, LLC)
- Sister stations: KSGF-FM; KSPW; KRVI

History
- First air date: August 29, 1948
- Call sign meaning: Keep Tuned (or Talking) To Springfield

Technical information
- Licensing authority: FCC
- Facility ID: 62023
- Class: C
- ERP: 100,000 watts
- HAAT: 336 meters (1,102 ft)
- Transmitter coordinates: 37°10′30.1″N 93°2′35.6″W

Links
- Public license information: Public file; LMS
- Webcast: Listen live
- Website: www.ktts.com

KTTS-FM (94.7 MHz) is a country music formatted radio station, licensed to Springfield, Missouri and the greater Springfield area. It began broadcasting in 1948, and is one of the oldest FM stations in the United States.

== Programming ==
KTTS mainly plays country songs, along with news and weather.

== History ==
KTTS-FM began broadcasting on August 29, 1948, on 94.7 MHz as the first FM station in Springfield, Missouri. It was established by the Independent Broadcasting Company as a sister station to its AM station, KTTS (1400 AM).

Granville Pearson Ward had been general manager of KTTS (AM) since its establishment in 1942. He also had extensive earlier experience, and had helped establish Springfield's first radio station, WIAI, licensed to the Heer Stores Co. in the summer of 1922, which broadcast educational programming from Heer's Tower downtown. In 1924 store management shut that station down. Ward purchased its transmitter, and in early 1925 began operating a new station, KFUV, that was licensed to him. KFUV went off the air one year later.

In March 1953, KTTS-TV, a CBS affiliate, was launched as the city's first television station. In 1971, the television station was sold and its call letters were changed to KOLR-TV.

The KTTS of today was created by Great Empire Broadcasting in the early 1970s. According to (now former) station manager Curt Brown, KTTS aired an adult standards format until 1972 when the country formats were installed. KTTS aired more classic country, and KTTS-FM aired more modern country. In the late 1980s, KTTS's AM frequency traded frequencies with KGBX, moving KTTS from AM 1400 to AM 1260, which gave them a wider signal range, and gave KGBX the money to buy an FM allotment. Today, AM 1400 is known as KGMY and owned by iHeartMedia.

In 1999, the AM 1260 call letters became KTTF, and then a short while later, KSGF, with the KTTS call sign remaining on the FM station. KSGF and KTTS-FM remained under common ownership until the AM 1260 facility's closure in 2025.

Journal Communications and the E. W. Scripps Company announced on July 30, 2014, that the two companies would merge to create a new broadcast company under the E.W. Scripps Company name that would own the two companies' broadcast properties, including KTTS-FM. The transaction was slated to be completed in 2015, pending shareholder and regulatory approvals. Scripps exited radio in 2018; the Springfield stations went to SummitMedia in a four-market, $47 million deal completed on November 1, 2018.

== Former on-air staff ==
Bob Barker, star of the TV show The Price Is Right, got his first job in media with KTTS in the 1940s. Barker lived in Springfield and graduated from Central High School; he worked for KTTS while attending Drury College (now University).
