= KSGF-FM =

- Ash Grove, Missouri; United States
- Broadcast area: Springfield, Missouri
- Frequency: 104.1 MHz
- Branding: 104.1 KSGF

Programming
- Format: News/talk
- Affiliations: Fox News Radio; Premiere Networks; Radio America; Westwood One

Ownership
- Owner: SummitMedia; (SM-KSGF-FM, LLC)
- Sister stations: KRVI; KSPW; KTTS-FM

History
- First air date: March 1, 1994 (as KZPD)
- Former call signs: KZPD (1990–1996); KQMO (1996–1998); KZRQ (1998–2003)
- Call sign meaning: Springfield

Technical information
- Licensing authority: FCC
- Facility ID: 2924
- Class: C3
- ERP: 19,000 watts
- HAAT: 114 meters (374 ft)
- Transmitter coordinates: 37.2562°N 93.6874°W

Links
- Public license information: Public file; LMS
- Webcast: Listen live
- Website: www.ksgf.com

KSGF-FM (104.1 MHz) is a radio station broadcasting a news/talk format. Licensed to Ash Grove, Missouri, United States, it serves the Springfield, Missouri, area. The station is owned by SummitMedia.

Journal Communications and the E. W. Scripps Company announced on July 30, 2014, that the two companies would merge to create a new broadcast company under the E.W. Scripps Company name that owned the two companies' broadcast properties, including KSGF-FM. The transaction was completed in 2015, pending shareholder and regulatory approvals. Scripps exited radio in 2018; the Springfield stations went to SummitMedia in a four-market, $47 million deal completed on November 1, 2018.

== Programming ==
KSGF broadcasts a news/talk radio format. Weekday programming includes a local morning show, "KSGF Mornings with Nick Reed". The remainder of the weekday is taken up by syndicated shows hosted by Glenn Beck, Dana Loesch, Sean Hannity, Mark Levin, Ben Shapiro, Armstrong and Getty, and Red Eye Radio.

Weekend programming includes many local shows including James Clary, Kyle Wyatt, Dustin Atwood, and Sarah Myers. Local news comes from the KTTS news team and national news comes from Fox News Radio.
