= KFKB =

Currently silent
- Wichita, Kansas; United States
- Broadcast area: Wichita metropolitan area
- Frequency: 1070 kHz
- Branding: Classic Country 1070

Programming
- Format: Classic country

Ownership
- Owner: Ad Astra Per Aspera Broadcasting

History
- First air date: September 20, 1923 (as KFKB)
- Former call signs: KFKB (1923–1931); KFBI (1931–1960); KIRL (1960–1962); KFDI (1962–2001); KFTI (2001–2010); KLIO (2010–2014); KFTI (2014–2026)

Technical information
- Licensing authority: FCC
- Facility ID: 72356
- Class: B
- Power: 10,000 watts day; 1,000 watts night
- Transmitter coordinates: 37°45′41″N 97°20′0.2″W

Links
- Public license information: Public file; LMS

KFKB (1070 AM) is a radio station licensed to Wichita, Kansas, United States, which serves the Wichita metropolitan area.

The station is one of the oldest stations in Kansas, dating to 1923, when it was founded in Milford by the notorious "goat gland doctor", J. R. Brinkley.

== History ==
=== Establishment in Milford as KFKB ===
The station was first licensed, as KFKB, on September 20, 1923, to the Brinkley-Jones Hospital Association in the small town of Milford, Kansas, transmitting on 1050 kHz. The call letters were randomly assigned from an alphabetical roster of available call signs, with the slogans of "Kansas Folks Know Best" and "Kansas First, Kansas Best" later adopted based on the call sign.

John R. Brinkley was the dominant force for both the hospital and for KFKB. He became interested in the potential of radio broadcasting soon after its introduction in the early 1920s. Brinkley was promoting a "goat gland" transplant operation, claimed to revive men's failing libidos. During a medical trip to California, he was impressed by a visit to the Los Angeles Times radio station, KHJ. After its introduction, KFKB was used to promote the hospital and a line of pharmaceutical products, and profits from these two sources provided funds that financed an ambitious range of programming. During 1923 and 1924 the station also carried remote broadcasts originating from the state college campus at Manhattan.

KFKB was deleted on June 3, 1925, then relicensed on October 23, 1926, again as KFKB, assigned to J. R. Brinkley, M. D. KFKB's revival occurred during a period when the U.S. government had temporarily lost its authority to assign transmitting frequencies. At the end of 1926 the station was reported broadcasting on a non-standard frequency of 695 kHz.

Following the formation of the Federal Radio Commission (FRC) in early 1927, KFKB was assigned to 1370 kHz on May 3, 1927, which was changed to 1240 kHz the next month. On November 11, 1928, under the provisions of the FRC's General Order 40, KFKB was assigned to 1130 kHz. However, in February 1929, the station was reassigned to 1050 kHz on a "limited time" basis, required to sign off as of sunset in Los Angeles, in order to limit interference to the frequency's dominant "clear channel" occupant located there, KNX.

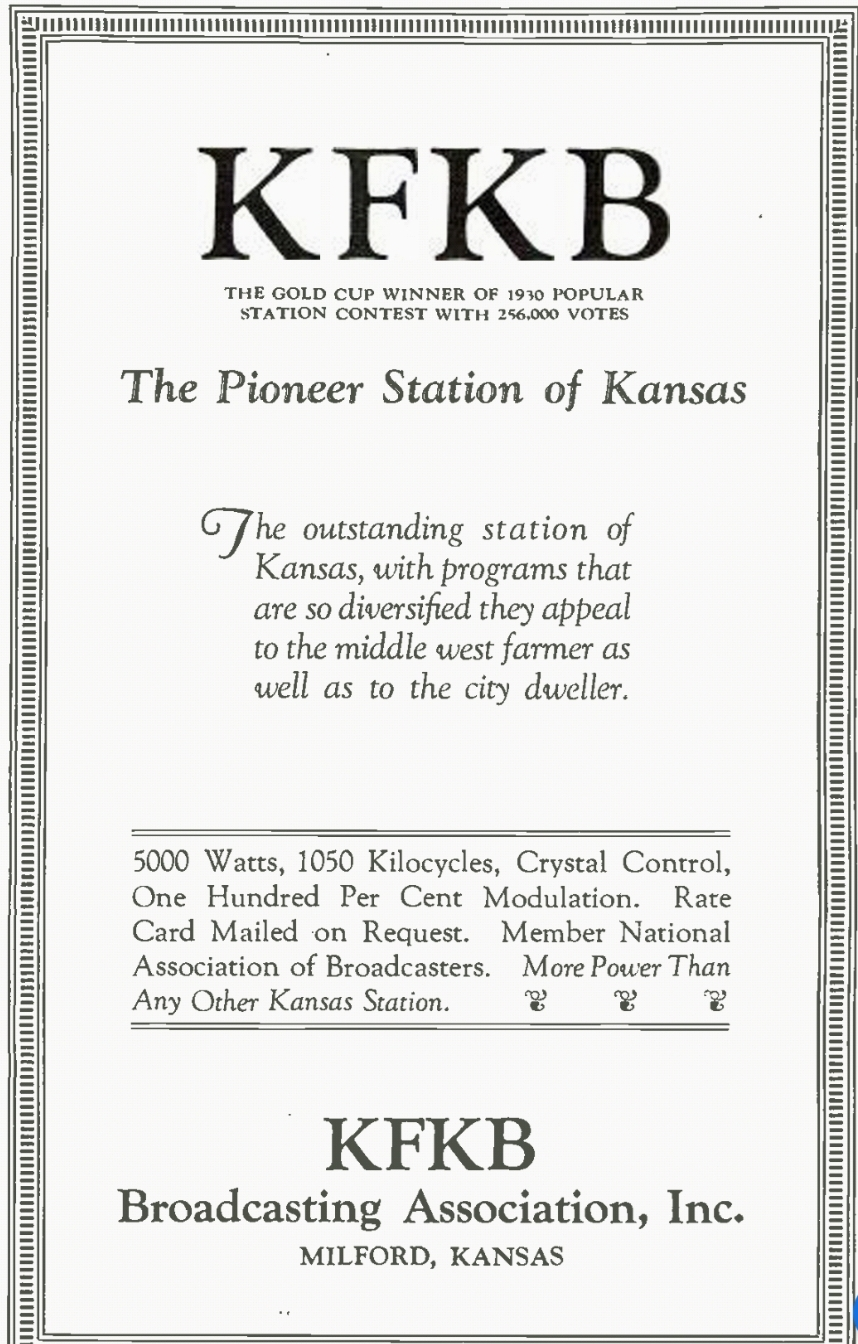
In 1930, Radio Digest magazine reported that KFKB was the most popular station in the United States.

In late 1929, Radio Digest magazine reported that: "The slogan of KFKB, 'The Sunshine Station in the Heart of the Nation', was contributed by a little shut-in, a poor crippled girl, who said that it was the friendly attitude of the station, and the good cheer brought to the homes of those who are forever crippled made her think that the station was a beacon of sunshine, and since the station is located within 12 miles of the geographical center of the United States, the 'heart of the nation' was appropriate." A few months later, the magazine proclaimed that, as a result of a contest it had held, KFKB was the "World's Most Popular Station".

Despite KFKB's popularity, Brinkley's controversial medical practices brought scrutiny from both the medical profession and the Federal Radio Commission, which began a review whether the station's license should be renewed. Brinkley claimed that silencing his radio station would amount to prohibited government censorship. However, after three days of hearings in May 1930, the commission voted not to renew KFKB's operating authority. Of particular concern was Brinkley's daily "Medical Question Box" programs. The commissioners concluded "that the practice of a physician's prescribing treatment for a patient whom he has never seen, and bases his diagnosis upon what symptoms may be recited by the patient in a letter addressed to him, is inimical to the public health and safety, and for that reason is not in the public interest".

KFKB was allowed to remain on the air while this ruling was being appealed through the courts. Brinkley used its airtime in an unsuccessful effort to be elected governor of Kansas in November 1930 via a write-in campaign. Finally, on February 2, 1931, the Court of Appeals of District of Columbia upheld the FRC's ruling denying the station's license renewal. Brinkley responded by establishing the first high-powered "border blaster" station, XER in Villa Acuña, Mexico, located just south of the U.S. border, with programming primarily aimed at an American audience.

=== Acquisition by the Farmers and Bankers Life Insurance Company ===
On February 20, 1931, the Farmers and Bankers Life Insurance Company was authorized to take over station operations, and the call sign was changed to KFBI on May 1, 1931. In 1932, studios were moved to Abilene, Kansas, although the transmitter site remained in Milford. Shortly after this remote studios were established in Salina, Kansas, on the second floor of the Fox-Watson Theatre. Paul Harvey was hired as station manager - a significant career move for the then-teenager, who later became a prominent ABC Radio Networks commentator.

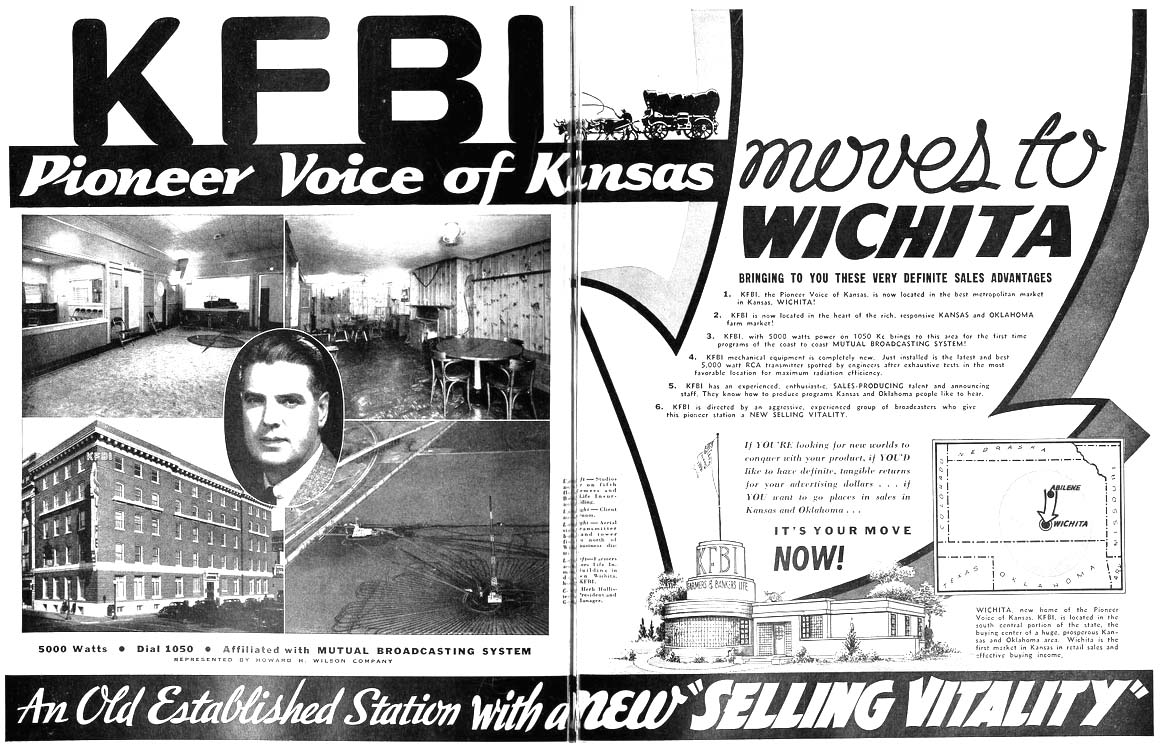
In early 1940, KFBI relocated both its transmitter site in Milford and its studios in Abilene to Wichita.

In early 1940, KFBI relocated both its transmitter site and studios to Wichita. This move included the installation of a directional antenna with a strong null to the west, to be used at night, which eliminated the limitation that had previously restricted KFBI's hours of operation due to the need to protect KNX's nighttime signal. On March 29, 1941, as part of the implementation of the North American Regional Broadcasting Agreement, stations on 1050 kHz, including KFBI, moved to 1070 kHz.

=== KIRL and KFDI ===
In 1958 Hollywood actors Mary Pickford and Charles "Buddy" Rogers bought the station for $450,000. Early in her career Pickford was known as the "Girl With the Golden Curls", and the call letters were changed to the phonetically similar KIRL in 1960. Two years later KIRL was sold to Bernice L. and F. F. (Mike) Lynch for $400,000. At the time, KIRL was operating on 1070 kHz with 10 kilowatt daytime signal and 1 kilowatt night power. After the Federal Bureau of Investigation objected to the station returning to "KFBI", the Lynches renamed the station to KFDI.

In 1964, Mike ("'Ol Mike") Oatman became KFDI's program director and on-air personality. Soon thereafter, Oatman and Mike Lynch became co-owners of Great Empire Broadcasting Inc., ultimately the parent company of KFDI and KFDI-FM. KFDI became the flagship station of Great Empire Broadcasting Inc. KFDI, airing country-western music, was the dominant radio station in the Wichita metro-area market, until the rise of rock'n'roll eroded its market share. By 1976, KFDI was being edged out by Wichita rock stations KLEO and (to a lesser extent) KEYN-FM in the under-35 age group. However the combined ratings of the KFDI stations remained dominant with the area's over-35 listeners.

In 1999, Great Empire Broadcasting (including KFDI) was sold to the Journal Broadcast Group, but KFDI kept its news, weather, and country-western music formats. On August 30, 1999, KFDI AM changed to a classic country format, moving current and recurrent music to KFDI-FM.

=== KFTI and KLIO ===
On April 3, 2001, the call letters were changed to KFTI. On May 27, 2010, at 12:30 p.m., after nearly 50 years of country music programming, the station changed call letters to KLIO and switched to oldies programming, airing music from the late 1950s through the early 1980s, with an emphasis on mid-1960s through mid-1970s. The station was an affiliate of Scott Shannon's True Oldies Channel, and also aired period American Top 40 with Casey Kasem programs.

At midnight on September 30, 2013, KLIO switched from "True Oldies" to ESPN Deportes Radio programming. Journal Communications and the E. W. Scripps Company announced on July 30, 2014, that the two companies were merging, creating a new broadcast company under the E. W. Scripps Company name that would own their combined broadcast properties, including KLIO. The transaction was slated to be completed in 2015, pending shareholder and regulatory approvals.

At midnight on October 22, 2014, KLIO switched from ESPN Deportes Radio back to classic country, now simulcasting KFTI-FM, which Journal Communications was selling to Envision, a non-profit low vision advocacy group, in order to meet ownership requirements, as the Scripps buyout nullified the grandfathered ownership clause Journal had. The format and KFTI call letters were restored after a 4½-year absence. The simulcast lasted until the sale of KFTI-FM was approved on December 12, 2014.

Scripps exited radio in 2018 and the Wichita stations went to SummitMedia in a four-market, $47 million deal completed on November 1, 2018.

On January 16, 2026, KFTI went silent due to transmitter problems because of copper theft. On August 28, 2026, Ad Astra Per Aspera Broadcasting acquired KFTI from SummitMedia; concurrently, the station filed to change its call sign back to KFKB, which became effective on September 4, 2026.
