= Times Record News =

Daily newspaper published in Wichita Falls, Texas, United States

- Type: Daily newspaper
- Format: Broadsheet
- Owner: USA Today Co.
- Editor: Claire Kowalick
- Founded: 1907; 119 years ago
- Headquarters: 1301 Lamar; Wichita Falls, TX, 76301; United States
- Country: United States
- Circulation: 4,779 (as of 2023)
- ISSN: 0895-6138
- Website: timesrecordnews.com

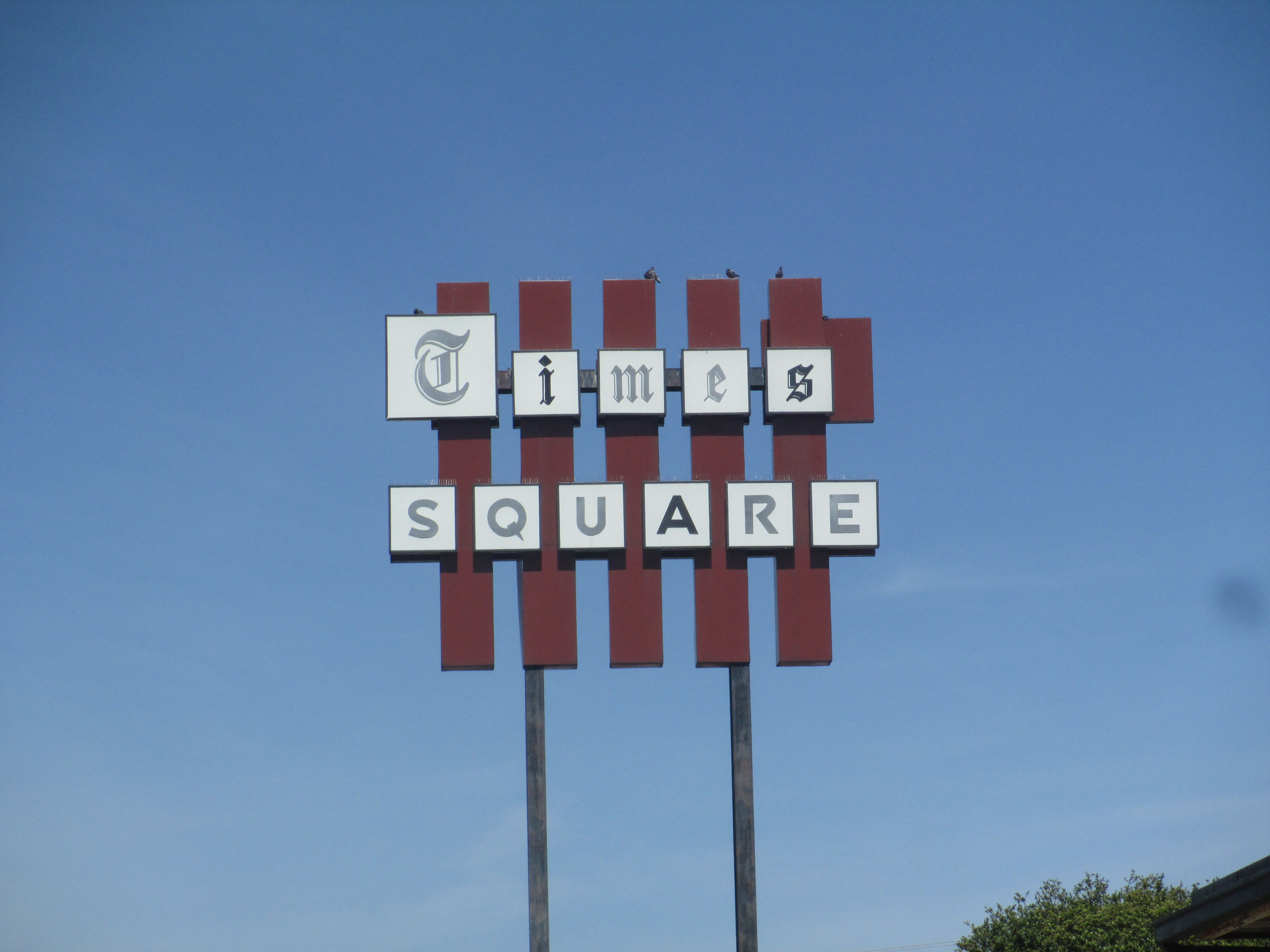
"Times Square" in Wichita Falls refers to the Wichita Falls Times Record News, located across Lamar Street from the Kemp Center for the Arts.

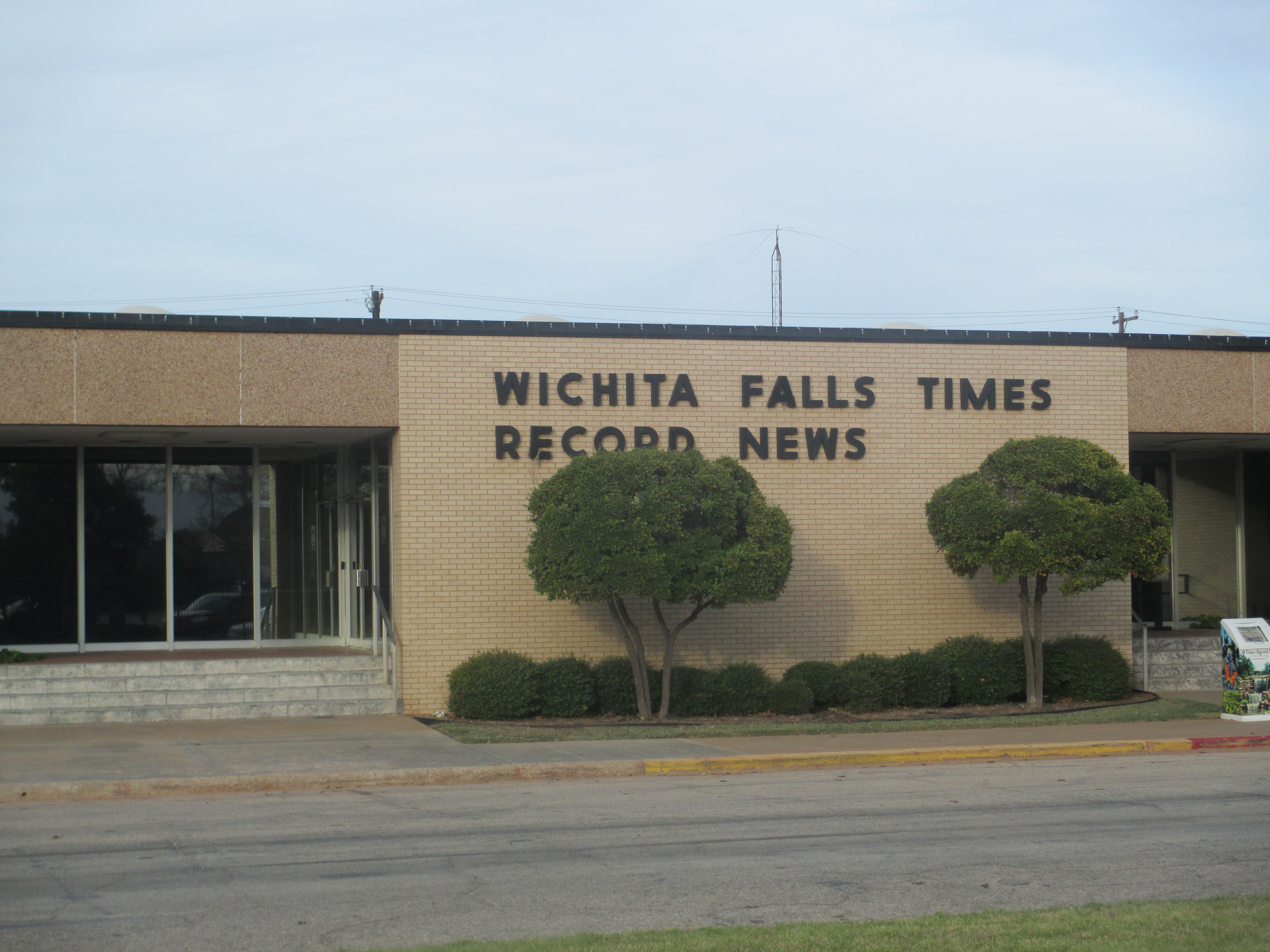
Wichita Falls Times Record News office

Times Record News is a daily newspaper established in 1907 in Wichita Falls, Texas and owned by USA Today Co.

From 1976 until 1997, the Times Record News was part of Harte Hanks chain, when Scripps acquired the paper.

The Times Record News also publishes the Sheppard Senator, the local newspaper serving the military stationed in Wichita Falls at Sheppard Air Force Base, named for the late U.S. Senator Morris Sheppard of Texarkana.

In March 2022, the Times Record News moved to a six-day printing schedule, eliminating its printed Saturday edition.
