= Envision, Inc. =

Not-for-profit in Wichita, Kansas, US

Envision, Inc. is a not-for-profit in Wichita, Kansas, United States. Envision promotes advocacy and independence for those who are blind or low vision.

== History ==
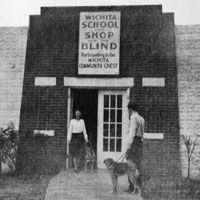
Wichita Workshop and Training School for the Adult Blind building.

Envision was founded in 1933 as the Wichita Workshop and Training School for the Adult Blind. The facility taught individuals who were blind how to make and sell their own products.

The passage of the Javits-Wagner-O'Day Act in 1938 brought government contracts to companies who employed people who are blind, allowing them to make products within government specifications. During World War II, The Wichita Workshop and Training School for the Adult Blind began supplying pillowcases and brooms to the federal government.

During the 1950s, the Wichita Workshop and Training School changed its name to the Kansas Foundation for the Blind and partnered with Lions Clubs across the country to sell its brooms. It was known as the Caravan of Brooms.

Product lines were expanded in the 1960s to include brooms, pillowcases, seat belts, cleaning cloths, doormats and janitorial products.

In 1986, the name was changed to Wichita Industries and Services for the Blind. In 1997, the organization became known as Envision.

Envision is one of approximately 500 nonprofit organizations that provide products and services to the Federal Government through the AbilityOne Program. Products are sold to the public through the Envision Everyday online and retail store at the Envision headquarters.

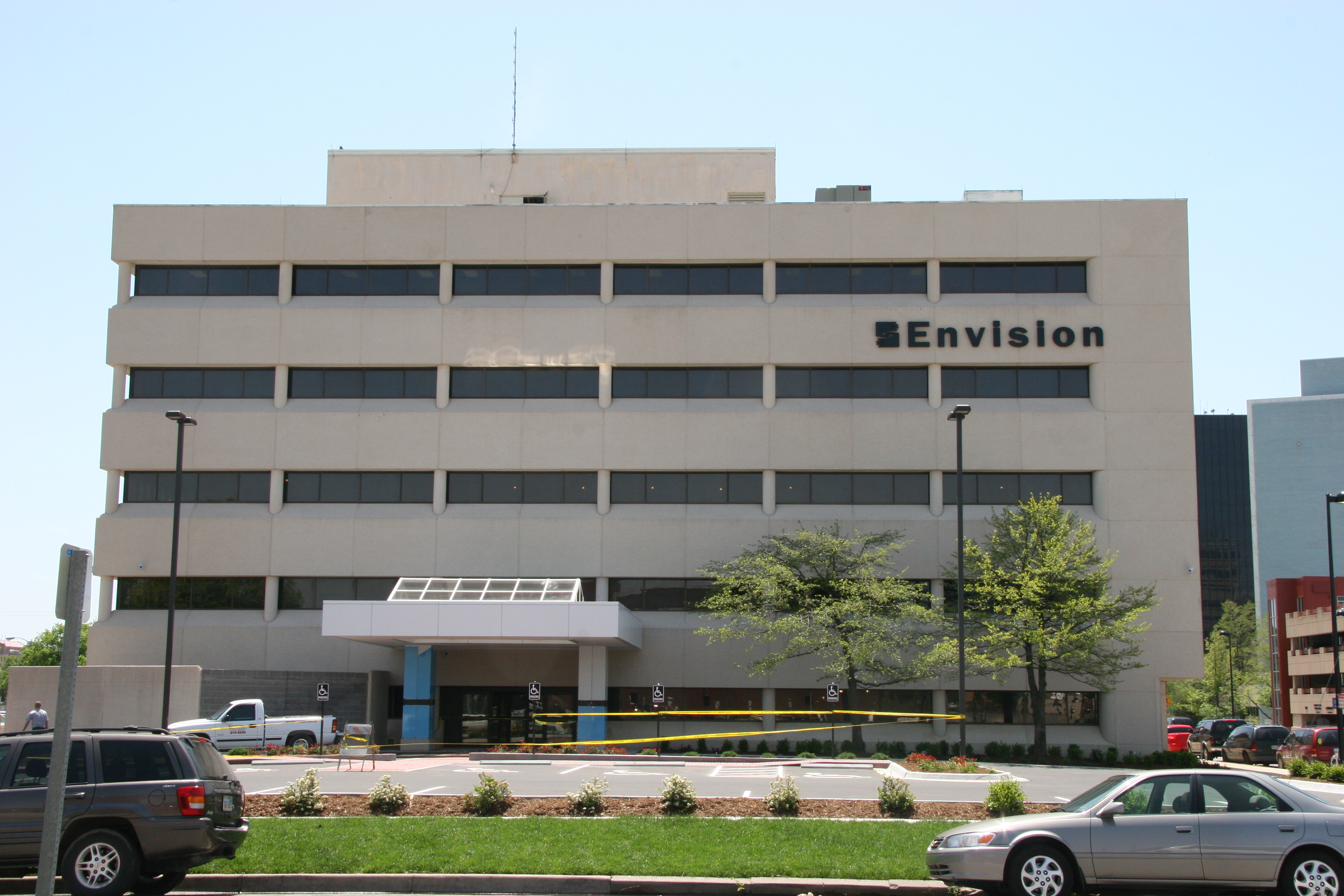
Envision's current headquarters, 610 N. Main, Wichita, Kansas

In 2014, Envision launched the Envision-Research-Institute Envision Research Institute and the Envision Broadcast Network that included Q92 FM. Q92 operations merged with Rocking M Media in April 2017.

== Continuing Education for Low-Vision Professionals ==
In 2006, the Envision Conference was launched. Envision University serves low-vision professionals in a variety of disciplines, including optometrists, ophthalmologists, occupational therapists, rehabilitation therapists, licensed visual therapists, orientation and mobility specialists, vision researchers, special education teachers, assistive technology practitioners, to provide continuing education opportunities.
