= List of radio stations in Kansas =

The following is a list of FCC-licensed radio stations in the U.S. state of Kansas, which can be sorted by their call signs, frequencies, cities of license, licensees, and programming formats.

== List of radio stations ==
Call sign	Frequency	City of License	Licensee	Format
KABI	1560 AM	Abilene	Meridian Media, LLC	Classic country
KACY	102.5 FM	Arkansas City	Tornado Alley Communications, LLC	Classic hits
KACZ	96.3 FM	Riley	Manhattan Broadcasting Co., Inc.	Top 40 (CHR)
KAHE	95.5 FM	Dodge City	Rocking M Media, LLC	Classic hits
KAIG	89.9 FM	Dodge City	Educational Media Foundation	Worship music (Air1)
KAIR-FM	93.7 FM	Horton	KNZA, Inc.	Country
KAKA	88.5 FM	Salina	American Family Association	Inspirational (AFR)
KANH	89.7 FM	Emporia	University of Kansas	Public radio
KANQ	90.3 FM	Chanute	University of Kansas	Public radio
KANS	96.1 FM	Emporia	My Town Media Inc	Adult hits
KANU	91.5 FM	Lawrence	University of Kansas	NPR News, Classical, Jazz
KANV	91.3 FM	Olsburg	The University of Kansas	Public radio
KANZ	91.1 FM	Garden City	Kanza Society, Inc.	Public radio; NPR News; Classical; Jazz
KARF	91.5 FM	Independence	Community Broadcasting, Inc.	Religious talk (Bott Radio Network)
KAXR	91.3 FM	Arkansas City	American Family Association	Religious talk (AFR)
KAXZ-LP	100.9 FM	Wichita	Calvary Chapel of Wichita, Inc.	Religious Teaching
KAYS	1400 AM	Hays	Eagle Communications, Inc.	Oldies
KBCU	88.1 FM	North Newton	Bethel College	College/Jazz
KBDA	89.7 FM	Great Bend	American Family Association	Religious Talk (AFR)
KBDD	91.9 FM	Winfield	Family Worship Center Church, Inc.	Religious
KBFZ-LP	101.7 FM	Garden City	Buffalo Broadcasting System	Eighties
KBGL	106.9 FM	Larned	Hull Broadcasting, Inc.	Top 40 (CHR)
KBIK	102.9 FM	Independence	My Town Media, Inc.	Country
KBJQ	88.3 FM	Bronson	American Family Association	Inspirational (AFR)
KBLS	102.5 FM	North Fort Riley	Manhattan Broadcasting Co., Inc.	Adult contemporary
KBMP	90.5 FM	Enterprise	Community Broadcasting, Inc.	Religious talk (Bott Radio Network)
KBOB-FM	97.1 FM	Haven	My Town Media Inc	Adult hits
KBQC	88.5 FM	Independence	American Family Association	Religious talk (AFR)
KBTL	88.1 FM	El Dorado	Butler County Community College	College
KBUF	1030 AM	Holcomb	Western Kansas Broadcast Center, LLC	News/Talk
KBUZ	90.3 FM	Topeka	American Family Association	Inspirational (AFR)
KCAR-FM	104.3 FM	Baxter Springs	American Media Investments Inc.	Adult contemporary
KCCA-LP	92.1 FM	Anthony	The Christian Church of Anthony, Kansas, Inc.	Christian
KCCV	760 AM	Overland Park	Bott Broadcasting Company	Religious talk (Bott Radio Network)
KCCV-FM	92.3 FM	Olathe	Bott Broadcasting Company	Religious talk (Bott Radio Network)
KCDI-LP	99.7 FM	Dodge City	Iglesia Bautista Emanuel	Spanish religious
KCFN	91.1 FM	Wichita	American Family Association	Inspirational (AFR)
KCGG-LP	100.7 FM	Kansas City	Iglesia Pentecostal Casa de Dios Para las Naciones Inc	Spanish Religious
KCHZ	95.7 FM	Ottawa	CMP Houston-KC, LLC	Talk
KCIU-LP	91.1 FM	Lawrence	Lawrence Chinese Evangelical Church	Christian Chinese
KCLY	100.9 FM	Clay Center	Taylor Communications, Inc.	Variety
KCMO-FM	94.9 FM	Shawnee	CMP Houston-KC, LLC	Classic hits
KCNW	1380 AM	Fairway	Kansas City Radio, Inc.	Christian
KCVS	91.7 FM	Salina	VCY America, Inc.	Conservative religious
KCVT	92.5 FM	Silver Lake	Richard P. Bott, II	Religious talk (Bott Radio Network)
KCVW	94.3 FM	Kingman	Community Broadcasting, Inc.	Religious talk (Bott Radio Network)
KCZZ	1480 AM	Mission	Reyes Media Group, Inc.	Regional Mexican
KDCC	1550 AM	Dodge City	Dodge City Community College	Sports (ISN)
KDGS	93.5 FM	Andover	Audacy License, LLC	Rhythmic contemporary
KDKQ-LP	105.9 FM	Derby	Derby Community Radio, Inc.	Christian Contemporary
KDNS	94.1 FM	Downs	Dierking Communications, Inc.	Country
KDTD	1340 AM	Kansas City	Reyes Media Group, Inc.	Regional Mexican
KDVV	100.3 FM	Topeka	Cumulus Licensing LLC	Classic rock
KEKL	90.7 FM	Emporia	Educational Media Foundation	Contemporary Christian (K-Love)
KEKS	103.1 FM	Olpe	Andrew A. Wachter	Top 40 (CHR)
KEOJ	101.1 FM	Caney	KXOJ, Inc.	Sports
KERP	96.3 FM	Ingalls	Rocking M Media, LLC	Country
KEYN-FM	103.7 FM	Wichita	Audacy License, LLC	Classic hits
KFBZ	105.3 FM	Haysville	Audacy License, LLC	Hot adult contemporary
KFDI-FM	101.3 FM	Wichita	SM-KFDI, LLC	Country
KFEX-LP	93.1 FM	Chanute	Fire Escape Youth Ministries, Inc.	Christian rock
KFFX	104.9 FM	Emporia	Emporia's Radio Stations, Inc.	Adult contemporary
KFGB-LP	97.7 FM	Topeka	Family of God Fellowship Church, Inc.	Contemporary Christian
KFH	1240 AM	Wichita	Audacy License, LLC	Sports (ISN)
KFIX	96.9 FM	Plainville	Hull Broadcasting, Inc.	Classic rock
KFKB	1070 AM	Wichita	Ad Astra per Aspera Broadcasting, Inc.	Classic country
KFKF-FM	94.1 FM	Kansas City	MGTF Media Company, LLC	Country
KFMP	88.3 FM	Meade	St. John the Baptist Catholic Church of Meade, Kansas	Religious
KFNF	101.1 FM	Oberlin	Armada Media – Mccook, Inc.	Country
KFRM	550 AM	Salina	Taylor Communications, Inc.	Full Service
KFXJ	104.5 FM	Augusta	SM-KFXJ, LLC	Classic rock
KGBK	98.9 FM	Larned	Ad Astra per Aspera Broadcasting, Inc.	Country
KGBL	100.9 FM	Lakin	Steckline Communications, Inc.	Country
KGCR	107.7 FM	Goodland	Great Plains Christian Radio, Inc.	Religious/Christian adult contemporary
KGGF	690 AM	Coffeyville	SEK Media, LLC	News/Talk
KGGF-FM	104.1 FM	Fredonia	SEK Media, LLC	Oldies
KGHF	99.7 FM	Belle Plaine	Steckline Communications, Inc.	Classic country
KGIH-LP	106.5 FM	Abilene	St. Therese Radio, Inc.	Catholic
KGLV	88.9 FM	Manhattan	Educational Media Foundation	Contemporary Christian (K-Love)
KGNO	1370 AM	Dodge City	Rocking M Media, LLC	Talk
KGOH	89.1 FM	Colby	Divine Mercy Radio, Inc.	Catholic
KGSO	1410 AM	Wichita	Steckline Communications, Inc.	Sports (FSR)
KHAZ	99.5 FM	Hays	Eagle Communications, Inc.	Country
KHCA	95.3 FM	Wamego	KHCA, Inc.	Christian
KHCC-FM	90.1 FM	Hutchinson	Hutchinson Community College	Classical
KHCD	89.5 FM	Salina	Hutchinson Community College	Classical
KHCT	90.9 FM	Great Bend	Hutchinson Community College	Classical
KHDL	99.5 FM	Americus	Robert Young	Classic country/Red dirt
KHGN	106.7 FM	Hugoton	Western Kansas Broadcast Center, LLC	1980s hits
KHMY	93.1 FM	Pratt	Eagle Communications, Inc.	Top 40 (CHR)
KHOK	100.7 FM	Hoisington	Eagle Communications, Inc.	Country
KHUT	102.9 FM	Hutchinson	Eagle Communications, Inc.	Country
KHYC	91.5 FM	Scott City	Great Plains Christian Radio, Inc.	Christian
KHYM	103.9 FM	Copeland	Great Plains Christian Radio, Inc.	Christian
KHYS	89.7 FM	Hays	American Family Association	Inspirational (AFR)
KHZZ-LP	100.1 FM	Hays	Maranatha Radio Association	Religious (3ABN)
KICT-FM	95.1 FM	Wichita	SM-KICT, LLC	Active rock
KIHB-LP	101.7 FM	Wichita	Three Angels Radio, Inc.	Christian
KIKS-FM	101.5 FM	Iola	Ad Astra per Aspera Broadcasting, Inc.	Country
KINA	910 AM	Salina	Eagle Communications, Inc.	News/Talk
KIND	1010 AM	Independence	My Town Media, Inc.	Sports (FSR)
KIND-FM	94.9 FM	Elk City	My Town Media, Inc.	Hot adult contemporary
KINZ	95.3 FM	Humboldt	My Town Media Inc.	Adult hits
KIOL	1370 AM	Iola	Ad Astra per Aspera Broadcasting, Inc.	News/Talk
KIUL	1240 AM	Garden City	Steckline Communications, Inc.	News/Talk
KIWW-LP	94.9 FM	Liberal	Iglesia de Dios de Manantial	Spanish Religious
KJAD-LP	100.7 FM	Topeka	Jerusalen Asamblea de Dios Inc.	Spanish religious
KJCK	1420 AM	Junction City	Eagle Communications, Inc.	Classic hits
KJCK-FM	97.5 FM	Junction City	Eagle Communications, Inc.	Top 40 (CHR)
KJDM	101.7 FM	Lindsborg	Divine Mercy Radio, Inc.	Catholic
KJGC	88.9 FM	Garden City	Great Plains Christian Radio, Inc.	Religious/Christian adult contemporary
KJHI	88.7 FM	Haviland	Great Plains Christian Radio, Inc.	Religious/Christian adult contemporary
KJHK	90.7 FM	Lawrence	The University of Kansas	College
KJIH	89.9 FM	Manhattan	Great Plains Christian Radio, Inc.	Religious/Christian adult contemporary
KJIL	99.1 FM	Copeland	Great Plains Christian Radio, Inc.	Religious/Christian adult contemporary
KJLG	91.9 FM	Emporia	Great Plains Christian Radio, Inc.	Religious/Christian adult contemporary
KJLJ	88.5 FM	Scott City	Great Plains Christian Radio, Inc.	Religious/Christian adult contemporary
KJLS	103.3 FM	Hays	Eagle Communications, Inc.	Hot adult contemporary
KJML	107.1 FM	Columbus	American Media Investments, Inc.	Active rock
KJRG	950 AM	Newton	Community Broadcasting, Inc.	Religious talk (Bott Radio Network)
KJRL	105.7 FM	Herington	Great Plains Christian Radio, Inc	Religious/Christian adult contemporary
KJTY	88.1 FM	Topeka	Family Life Broadcasting, Inc.	Religious (Family Life Radio)
KJVL	88.1 FM	Hutchinson	Great Plains Christian Radio, Inc.	Religious/Christian adult contemporary
KKAN	1490 AM	Phillipsburg	Robert D. Yates, Jr. d/b/a RTY Broadcasting	Variety/Full service
KKCV	102.5 FM	Rozel	Community Broadcasting, Inc..	Religious talk (Bott Radio Network)
KKDT	93.5 FM	Burdett	Post Rock Radio, LLC	Country
KKGQ	92.3 FM	Newton	Pinnacle Media, LLC	Sports (ESPN)
KKJQ	97.3 FM	Garden City	Western Kansas Broadcast Center, LLC	Country
KKLE	1550 AM	Winfield	My Town Media Inc	Bluegrass
KKLO	1410 AM	Leavenworth	Radio Vida Kansas, Inc.	Talk
KKOS-LP	106.7 FM	McPherson	PCRA, Inc.	Variety
KKOW	860 AM	Pittsburg	American Media Investments	Farm/Classic country
KKOW-FM	96.9 FM	Pittsburg	American Media Investments, Inc.	Country
KKOY	1460 AM	Chanute	My Town Media Inc.	News/Talk
KKOY-FM	105.5 FM	Chanute	My Town Media Inc.	Rhythmic contemporary
KKQY	101.9 FM	Hill City	Eagle Communications, Inc.	Country
KKSJ-LP	107.5 FM	Beloit	Cornerstone Charitable Foundation	Catholic talk
KKSW	105.9 FM	Lawrence	Great Plains Media, Inc.	Top 40 (CHR)
KLBG	95.5 FM	Lindsborg	Ad Astra per Aspera Broadcasting, Inc.	Mainstream rock
KLCM	88.1 FM	Ulysses	Libertad en Cristo Ministries	
KLDG	102.7 FM	Liberal	Seward County Broadcasting Co., Inc.	Country
KLEC	90.5 FM	Liberal	Libertad en Cristo Ministries	Spanish Religious
KLEY	1130 AM	Wellington	My Town Media Inc	Country
KLKC	1540 AM	Parsons	Parsons Media Group, LLC	News/Talk, Sports (FSR)
KLOE-FM	102.5 FM	Goodland	Melia Communications, Inc.	Classic rock
KLOJ-LP	98.9	Manhattan	Seven Dolors of the Blessed Virgin Mary Parish, Manhattan, Inc.	Religious
KLKC-FM	93.5 FM	Parsons	Parsons Media Group, LLC	Adult hits
KLQR	1510 AM	Larned	Ad Astra per Aspera Broadcasting, Inc.	Classic hits
KLWN	1320 AM	Lawrence	Great Plains Media, Inc.	News/Talk
KMAJ	1440 AM	Topeka	Cumulus Licensing LLC	News/Talk/Sports
KMAJ-FM	107.7 FM	Carbondale	Cumulus Licensing LLC	Adult contemporary
KMAN	1350 AM	Manhattan	Manhattan Broadcasting Co., Inc.	News/Talk
KMBZ-FM	98.1 FM	Kansas City	Audacy License, LLC	News/Talk
KMCP	1540 AM	McPherson	Ad Astra per Aspera Broadcasting, Inc.	Classic hits
KMDG	105.7 FM	Hays	Divine Mercy Radio, Inc.	Catholic
KMDO	1600 AM	Fort Scott	Fort Scott Broadcasting Company Inc.	Classic country
KMKF	101.5 FM	Manhattan	Manhattan Broadcasting Co., Inc.	Mainstream rock
KMLL	91.7 FM	Marysville	American Family Association	Inspirational (AFR)
KMML	92.9 FM	Cimarron	Western Kansas Broadcast Center, LLC	Silent
KMMM	1290 AM	Pratt	My Town Media Inc	Classic country
KMOQ	105.3 FM	Columbus	American Media Investments, Inc.	Classic rock
KMPK	96.7 FM	McPherson	Ad Astra per Aspera Broadcasting, Inc.	Adult contemporary
KMUW	89.1 FM	Wichita	Wichita State University	Public radio
KMXN	92.9 FM	Osage City	Great Plains Media, Inc.	Country
KMZA	92.1 FM	Seneca	KNZA, Inc.	Country
KNCK	1390 AM	Concordia	White Communications, LLC	Classic hits
KNCK-FM	94.9 FM	Concordia	White Communications, LLC	Hot adult contemporary
KNDY	1570 AM	Marysville	Dierking Communications, Inc.	Classic country
KNDY-FM	95.5 FM	Marysville	Dierking Communications, Inc.	Country
KNSS	1330 AM	Wichita	Audacy License, LLC	News/Talk
KNSS-FM	98.7 FM	Clearwater	Audacy License, LLC	News/Talk
KNZA	103.9 FM	Hiawatha	KNZA, Inc.	Country
KNZS	100.3 FM	Kingman	Ad Astra Per Aspera Broadcasting, Inc.	Classic rock
KODC-LP	102.1 FM	Dodge City	Kansas Sacred Heart Radio Corporation	Spanish Catholic
KOFO	1220 AM	Ottawa	Brandy Communications, Inc.	Country
KOGR-LP	98.5 FM	Minneapolis	Oak Grove Radio Association	Variety
KOKN	88.7 FM	Oketo	CSN International	Christian
KOMB	103.9 FM	Fort Scott	Fort Scott Broadcasting Company, Inc.	Classic hits
KONQ	91.9 FM	Dodge City	Kanza Society, Inc.	Public radio; NPR News; Classical; Jazz
KOOJ-LP	93.1 FM	Pittsburg	Our Lady of Mt. Carmel Education and Evangelization Society	Catholic
KOTE	93.9 FM	Eureka	Steckline Communications	Country
KOZA	96.9 FM	Effingham	Intrepid Companies, LLC	Hot adult contemporary
KPBL	89.3 FM	Beloit	Great Plains Christian Radio, Inc.	Religious/Christian adult contemporary
KPHN	1360 AM	El Dorado	Kansas City Catholic Network, Inc.	Catholic
KPIO-FM	93.7 FM	Pleasanton	Catholic Radio Network	Catholic
KPRD	88.9 FM	Hays	Great Plains Christian Radio, Inc.	Religious/Christian adult contemporary
KPSR	89.3	Smith Center	Great Plains Christian Radio, Inc.	Religious/Christian adult contemporary
KQAM	1480 AM	Wichita	Steckline Communications, Inc.	News/Talk
KQLA	103.5 FM	Ogden	Eagle Communications, Inc.	Country
KQMA	92.5 FM	Phillipsburg	Robert D. Yates, Jr. d/b/a RTY Broadcasting	Full service/Variety
KQNK	1530 AM	Norton	Dierking Communications, Inc.	Country
KQNK-FM	106.7 FM	Norton	Dierking Communications, Inc.	Classic hits
KQQF	98.9 FM	Coffeyville	SEK Media, LLC	Contemporary Christian
KQRC-FM	98.9 FM	Leavenworth	Audacy License, LLC	Mainstream rock
KQSH	90.7 FM	Dodge City	La Promesa Foundation	Catholic
KQUI-LP	100.3 FM	Ulysses	Primera Iglesia Bautista Ulysses, Inc.	Spanish religious
KQYX	1450 AM	Galena	American Media Investments Inc.	Top 40 (CHR)
KQZQ	98.3 FM	Kiowa	My Town Media, Inc.	Country
KRBB	97.9 FM	Wichita	iHM Licenses, LLC	Adult contemporary
KRBW	90.5 FM	Ottawa	American Family Association	Inspirational (AFR)
KRDQ	100.3 FM	Colby	Rocking M Media, LLC	Hot adult contemporary
KREJ	101.7 FM	Medicine Lodge	Smile FM	Religious
KREP	92.1 FM	Belleville	First Republic	Country
KRMI-LP	105.5 FM	Manhattan	Manhattan Chinese Ministry Association	Christian Chinese
KRPS	89.9 FM	Pittsburg	Pittsburg State University	Public radio
KRSL	990 AM	Russell	White Communications, L.L.C.	Classic country
KRSL-FM	95.9 FM	Russell	White Communications, L.L.C.	Adult hits
KRTT	88.1 FM	Great Bend	Divine Mercy Radio, Inc.	Catholic
KRTY	91.9 FM	Great Bend	Educational Media Foundation	Contemporary Christian (K-Love)
KSAJ-FM	98.5 FM	Burlingame	Alpha Media Licensee LLC	Adult hits
KSAL	1150 AM	Salina	Meridian Media, LLC	News/Talk
KSAL-FM	104.9 FM	Salina	Meridian Media, LLC	Classic hits
KSCB	1270 AM	Liberal	Seward County Broadcasting Co., Inc.	News/Talk
KSCB-FM	107.5 FM	Liberal	Seward County Broadcasting Co., Inc.	Hot adult contemporary
KSDB-FM	91.9 FM	Manhattan	Kansas State University	Modern rock, Urban, & Local
KSDH-LP	100.1 FM	Great Bend	Hope Radio Association	Religious Teaching
KSEK	1340 AM	Pittsburg	My Town Media Inc	Country
KSEK-FM	99.1 FM	Girard	American Media Investments, Inc.	Sports (FSR)
KSGC-LP	100.5 FM	Garden City	St. Gabriel Communications, Inc.	Catholic
KSGL	900 AM	Wichita	Agape Communications, Inc.	Religious/Adult standards
KSKG	99.9 FM	Salina	Eagle Communications, Inc.	Country
KSKL	94.5 FM	Scott City	Western Kansas Broadcast Center, LLC	Adult contemporary
KSKU	94.7 FM	Sterling	Ad Astra Per Aspera Broadcasting, Inc.	Top 40 (CHR)
KSKZ	98.1 FM	Copeland	Western Kansas Broadcast Center, LLC	Top 40 (CHR)
KSMK-LP	98.3 FM	St. Marys	St. Marys Academy Home Study School Assoc.	Religious/Classical
KSMM	1470 AM	Liberal	My Town Media Inc	Oldies
KSMM-FM	101.5 FM	Liberal	Rocking M Media, LLC	Regional Mexican
KSNB	91.5 FM	Norton	American Family Association	Inspirational (AFR)
KSNP	97.7 FM	Burlington	My Town Media Inc.	Classic rock
KSNS	91.5 FM	Medicine Lodge	Smile FM	Contemporary Christian
KSOK	1280 AM	Arkansas City	Doxa Wave, LLC	Classic country
KSOK-FM	95.9 FM	Winfield	Doxa Wave, LLC	Adult hits
KSRP	89.1 FM	Dodge City	Bible Baptist Church of Dodge City, Inc.	Gospel
KSSA	105.9 FM	Ingalls	Western Kansas Broadcast Center, LLC	Regional Mexican
KSWC-LP	94.7 FM	Winfield	Southwestern College	Top 40 (CHR)
KSWT-LP	89.7 FM	Topeka	Glory to God Covenant Community	Religious
KSWZ-LP	105.3 FM	St. George	The Sword of St. George, Inc.	Catholic
KTCC	91.9 FM	Colby	Colby Community College	College/Alternative rock
KTHR	107.3 FM	Wichita	iHM Licenses, LLC	Alternative rock
KTLI	99.1 FM	El Dorado	El Dorado Licenses, Inc.	Contemporary Christian (K-Love)
KTOP	1490 AM	Topeka	Cumulus Licensing LLC	Sports (ISN)
KTOP-FM	102.9 FM	St. Marys	Cumulus Licensing LLC	Country
KTPK	106.9 FM	Topeka	Alpha Media Licensee LLC	Classic country
KTRU	91.9 FM	La Harpe	St. Macrina Media and Education Society	Contemporary Christian
KTWI-LP	94.3 FM	Liberal	Liberal Music and Education Foundation	Variety
KULY	1420 AM	Ulysses	Western Kansas Broadcast Center, LLC	Classic hits
KUSN	98.1 FM	Dearing	SEK Media, LLC	Country
KVCO	88.3 FM	Concordia	Cloud County Community College	Active rock/College radio
KVCY	104.7 FM	Fort Scott	VCY America, Inc.	Conservative religious
KVDM	88.1 FM	Hays	Divine Mercy Radio, Inc.	Catholic
KVGB	1590 AM	Great Bend	Eagle Communications, Inc.	Talk
KVGB-FM	104.3 FM	Great Bend	Eagle Communications, Inc.	Classic rock
KVJH-LP	101.9 FM	Topeka	Templo de Alabanza el Shadai	Spanish religious
KVOE	1400 AM	Emporia	Emporia's Radio Stations, Inc.	News/Talk/Sports/Adult Contemporary
KVOE-FM	101.7 FM	Emporia	Emporia's Radio Stations, Inc.	Country
KVSV	1190 AM	Beloit	McGrath Publishing Company	Full service
KVSV-FM	105.5 FM	Beloit	McGrath Publishing Company	Adult standards
KVWF	100.5 FM	Augusta	My Town Media Inc	Country
KWBW	1450 AM	Hutchinson	Eagle Communications, Inc.	Talk
KWGB	97.9 FM	Colby	Melia Communications Inc	Country
KWHK	95.9 FM	Hutchinson	Ad Astra Per Aspera Broadcasting, Inc.	Classic hits
KWIC	99.3 FM	Topeka	Cumulus Licensing LLC	Classic hits
KWJP	89.7 FM	Paola	Community Broadcasting, Inc.	Christian
KWKN	95.3 FM	Wakeeney	One Media, Inc.	Talk/Sports
KWKR	99.9 FM	Leoti	Western Kansas Broadcast Center, LLC	Mainstream rock
KWLS	107.9 FM	Winfield	KWLS Radio, LLC	Country
KWME	92.7 FM	Wellington	My Town Media Inc	Classic hits
KWOD	1660 AM	Kansas City	Audacy License, LLC	Sports gambling
KXBZ	104.7 FM	Manhattan	Manhattan Broadcasting Co., Inc.	Country
KXGB-LP	105.1 FM	Great Bend	Catholic Radio of Great Bend, Inc.	Spanish Catholic
KXKU	106.1 FM	Lyons	Ad Astra Per Aspera Broadcasting, Inc.	Country
KXNC	104.7 FM	Ness City	Post Rock Radio, LLC	Top 40 (CHR)
KXXX	790 AM	Colby	Rocking M Media, LLC	Country and Agriculture
KYEZ	93.7 FM	Salina	Meridian Media, LLC	Country
KYFW	88.3 FM	Wichita	Bible Broadcasting Network, Inc.	Conservative religious (Bible Broadcasting Network)
KYOM-LP	104.9 FM	Wichita	Sunflower Community Action	Variety
KYQQ	106.5 FM	Arkansas City	SM-KYQQ, LLC	Spanish
KYUL	1310 AM	Scott City	Steckline Communications, Inc.	News/Talk
KYVZ	106.1 FM	Atwood	Joseph J. Vyzourek	Classic hits
KYWA	90.7 FM	Wichita	Hope Media Group	Contemporary Christian
KYYS	1250 AM	Kansas City	Audacy License, LLC	Regional Mexican
KZAN	91.7 FM	Hays	Kanza Society, Inc.	Public radio; NPR News; Classical; Jazz
KZBA-LP	100.1 FM	Bazine	Bazine Christian Radio Association	Religious Teaching
KZCH	96.3 FM	Derby	iHM Licenses, LLC	Top 40 (CHR)
KZCK	88.1 FM	Colby	Great Plains Christian Radio, Inc.	Christian
KZDY	96.3 FM	Cawker City	Dierking Communications, Inc.	Classic Rock
KZGC-FM	91.9 FM	Garden City	Radio Vida Kansas, Inc.	Hot AC/Adult album alternative
KZNA	90.5 FM	Hill City	Kanza Society, Inc.	Public radio; NPR News; Classical; Jazz
KZNK	90.1 FM	Brewster	Kanza Society, Inc.	Public radio; NPR News; Classical; Jazz
KZNZ	91.5 FM	Elkhart	Kanza Society, Inc.	Public radio; NPR News; Classical; Jazz
KZQD	105.1 FM	Liberal	Mario Loredo	Spanish variety
KZRD	93.9 FM	Dodge City	Rocking M Media, LLC	Bilingual English/Spanish Hot AC
KZRS	107.9 FM	Great Bend	White Communications, L.L.C.	Classic hits
KZSN	102.1 FM	Hutchinson	iHM Licenses, LLC	Country
KZUH	92.7 FM	Minneapolis	Great Plains Christian Radio, Inc.	Christian adult contemporary
WIBW	580 AM	Topeka	Alpha Media Licensee LLC	News/Talk/Sports
WIBW-FM	94.5 FM	Topeka	Alpha Media Licensee LLC	Country

== Defunct ==
- KCCC-LP - Hays
- KGGS - Garden City
- KLOE - Goodland
- KNJT - Coldwater
- KLZY-LP - Salina
- WEY - Wichita
- KNIU-LP - Kansas City
