= Mass media in Hays, Kansas =

Hays, Kansas is a center of media in central and northwestern Kansas. The following is a list of media outlets based in the city.

== Print ==
=== Newspapers ===
The Hays Daily News is the local newspaper, published two days a week on Wednesdays and Saturdays.

== Digital ==
- Hays Post, the most trafficked news website in northwest Kansas

== Radio ==
The following radio stations are licensed to and/or broadcast from Hays:

=== AM ===
Frequency	Callsign	Format	City of License	Notes
1400	KAYS	Variety	Hays, Kansas	-

=== FM ===
Frequency	Callsign	Format	City of License	Notes
88.1	KVDM	Religious	Hays, Kansas	-
88.5	K203FB	Christian Contemporary	Hays, Kansas	Translator of KJIL, Meade, Kansas
88.9	KPRD	Religious	Hays, Kansas	-
89.7	KHYS	Religious	Hays, Kansas	AFR
91.7	KZAN	Public	Hays, Kansas	NPR; Satellite of KANZ, Garden City, Kansas
93.5	KKDT	Country	Burdett, Kansas	Broadcast from Hays, KS
95.3	KWKN	Talk/Sports	WaKeeney, Kansas	-
96.9	KFIX	Classic rock	Plainville, Kansas	Broadcasts from Hays
98.5	KCCC-LP	Christian Contemporary	Hays, Kansas	-
99.5	KHAZ	Country	Hays, Kansas	-
100.1	KHZZ-LP	Religious	Hays, Kansas	-
101.9	KKQY	Country	Hill City, Kansas	Broadcasts from Hays
103.3	KJLS	Hot Adult Contemporary	Hays, Kansas	-
103.9	K227AS	Religious	Hays, Kansas	Translator of KCCV-FM, Olathe, Kansas
104.7	KXNC	Top 40	Ness City, Kansas	Broadcast from Hays, KS
105.7	KMDG	Catholic	Hays, Kansas	-

== Television ==
Hays is in the Wichita-Hutchinson, Kansas television market. The following television stations are licensed to and/or broadcast from Hays.

Display Channel	Network	Callsign	City of License	Notes
7.1	CBS	KBSH-DT	Hays, Kansas	Satellite station of KWCH-DT, Wichita, Kansas
7.2	Always On Storm Team 12	KBSH-DT	Hays, Kansas	Local weather
9.1	PBS (SD)	KOOD	Hays, Kansas	Broadcasts from studios in Bunker Hill, Kansas; 9.3 and 9.4 off-air 6:00 p.m. to 12:00 a.m.
9.2	PBS (HD)	KOOD	Hays, Kansas	Broadcasts from studios in Bunker Hill, Kansas; 9.3 and 9.4 off-air 6:00 p.m. to 12:00 a.m.
9.3	Create	KOOD	Hays, Kansas	Broadcasts from studios in Bunker Hill, Kansas; 9.3 and 9.4 off-air 6:00 p.m. to 12:00 a.m.
9.4	World	KOOD	Hays, Kansas	Broadcasts from studios in Bunker Hill, Kansas; 9.3 and 9.4 off-air 6:00 p.m. to 12:00 a.m.
25.1	ABC	K25CV	Hays, Kansas	Translator of KAKE, Wichita, Kansas
25.2	Me-TV	K25CV	Hays, Kansas	Translator of KAKE, Wichita, Kansas
