= Mass media in Salina, Kansas =

Salina is a center of media in north-central Kansas. The following is a list of media outlets based in the city.

== Print ==
Salina has one daily newspaper, The Salina Journal.

== Radio ==
The following radio stations are licensed to and/or broadcast from Salina:

=== AM ===
- 550 KFRM Salina (Talk radio)
- 910 KINA Salina (Talk radio)
- 1150 KSAL Salina (Talk radio)

=== FM ===
- 88.5 KAKA Salina (American Family Radio)
- 89.5 KHCD Salina (NPR/KHCC-FM)
- 91.7 KCVS Salina (VCY America)
- 92.7 KZUH Minneapolis (Contemporary hit radio)
- 93.7 KYEZ Salina (Country music)
- 94.5 K233CF Salina (Classic hits)
- 94.9 KNCK-FM Concordia (Hot adult contemporary)
- 95.5 KLBG Lindsborg (Active rock)
- 96.5 K243BD Salina (Contemporary Christian)
- 96.9 K245BN Salina (K-Love)
- 99.3 KLZY-LP Salina (Top 40/Dance/Latin pop)
- 99.9 KSKG Salina (Country music)
- 101.7 KJDM Lindsborg (Catholic radio)
- 102.5 KBLS North Fort Riley (Adult contemporary)
- 104.9 KSAL-FM Salina (Classic hits)
- 105.5 KVSV-FM Beloit Adult standards)
- 107.1 K296FD Salina (Bott Radio Network)
- 107.5 K298CZ Salina (Talk radio)

== Television ==
Salina is in the Wichita-Hutchinson, Kansas television market which covers the western two-thirds of the state.

Cox Communications is the main cable system serving the city. Salina is home to the only Public, educational, and government access (PEG) cable TV channels in the state. Cox customers can see local programming and create their own programming to be shown on channels 20 and 21.

The following television stations are licensed to and/or broadcast from Salina:

- 6 KSNL-LD Salina (NBC, satellite of KSNW)
- 15 K26PI-D Salina (Silent)
- 18 KAAS-TV Salina (Fox, satellite of KSAS-TV)
- 51 KHDS-LD Salina (ABC, translator of KAKE)
