= Mass media in Emporia, Kansas =

Emporia is a center of media in east-central Kansas. The following is a list of media outlets based in the city.

== Print ==
=== Newspapers ===
- The Emporia Gazette, daily
- Emporia State University Bulletin, weekly, Emporia State student newspaper
- La Voz, monthly, Spanish language

== Radio ==
The following radio stations are licensed to Emporia:

=== AM ===
Frequency	Callsign	Format	City of License	Notes
1400	KVOE	Adult Contemporary	Emporia, Kansas	-

=== FM ===
Frequency	Callsign	Format	City of License	Notes
89.3	K207EI	Religious	Emporia, Kansas	Translator of KAWZ, Twin Falls, Idaho
89.7	KANH	Public	Emporia, Kansas	NPR; Satellite of KANU, Lawrence, Kansas
90.7	KPOR	Religious	Emporia, Kansas	Family Radio
91.9	KJLG	Contemporary Christian	Emporia, Kansas	Simulcasts KJIL, Abilene, Kansas
94.1	K231AY	Sports	Emporia, Kansas	ESPN Radio
96.1	KANS	Adult Contemporary	Emporia, Kansas	-
96.9	K245BQ	News, Talk, Sports	Emporia, Kansas	-
99.5	KHDL	Classic Country	Americus, Kansas	ESPN Radio
101.7	KVOE-FM	Country	Emporia, Kansas	-
103.1	KEKS	Top 40	Olpe, Kansas	Broadcasts from Emporia
104.9	KFFX	Hot Adult Contemporary	Emporia, Kansas	Voice of the Hornets
106.1	K291AX	Religious	Emporia, Kansas	Translator of KCCV-FM, Overland Park, Kansas

== Television ==
Emporia is in the Topeka, Kansas television market. KETM-LP, a defunct translator station of Fox affiliate KTMJ-CD in Topeka, was licensed to Emporia and broadcast on analog channel 17.
