= KNDY =

KNDY may refer to:

- KNDY (AM), a radio station (1570 AM) licensed to Marysville, Kansas, United States
- KNDY-FM, a radio station (95.5 FM) licensed to Marysville, Kansas, United States
