= KGGF =

KGGF may refer to:

- KGGF (AM), a radio station (690 AM) licensed to Coffeyville, Kansas, United States
- KGGF-FM, a radio station (104.1 FM) licensed to Fredonia, Kansas, United States
