= KLKC =

KLKC may refer to:

- KLKC (AM), a radio station (1540 AM) licensed to Parsons, Kansas, United States
- KLKC-FM, a radio station (93.5 FM) licensed to Parsons, Kansas, United States
