= KNCK =

KNCK might refer to:

- KNCK (AM), a radio station (1390 AM) licensed to serve Concordia, Kansas, United States
- KNCK-FM, a radio station (94.9 FM) licensed to serve Concordia, Kansas, United States
