= KDNS =

- Downs, Kansas; United States
- Frequency: 94.1 MHz
- Branding: KD Country 94

Programming
- Format: Country

Ownership
- Owner: Dierking Communications
- Sister stations: KZDY, KNDY, KNDY-FM, KQNK

History
- First air date: April 11, 1994
- Call sign meaning: Downs

Technical information
- Licensing authority: FCC
- Facility ID: 27435
- Class: C2
- ERP: 28,000 watts
- HAAT: 89 meters (292 ft)

Links
- Public license information: Public file; LMS
- Webcast: Listen Live
- Website: www.kdcountry94.com

KDNS (94.1 FM) is a radio station broadcasting a Country music format. Licensed to Downs, Kansas, United States. The station is currently owned by Dierking Communications.

Previous logo
