= Taylor Communications (disambiguation) =

Taylor Communications may refer to:

- Taylor Corporation, a Minnesota-based printer and marketing graphics company (1975-)
- Taylor Communications, Inc., a Kansas-based radio broadcasting company owning KCLY and KFRM
- Taylor Communications, an Oklahoma-based internet radio and on hold messaging company renamed to AyerPlay Productions in 2013.
