= KQNK =

KQNK may refer to:

- KQNK (AM), a radio station (1530 AM) licensed to Norton, Kansas, United States
- KQNK-FM, a radio station (106.7 FM) licensed to Norton, Kansas, United States
