= KVSV =

KVSV may refer to:

- KVSV (AM), a radio station (1190 AM) licensed to Beloit, Kansas, United States
- KVSV-FM, a radio station (105.5 FM) licensed to Beloit, Kansas, United States
