= KRMR =

KRMR may refer to:

- KRMR (FM), a radio station (93.3 FM) licensed to serve Russian Mission, Alaska, United States
- KMDG, a radio station (105.7 FM) licensed to serve Hays, Kansas, United States, which held the call sign KRMR from 2008 to 2020
- KRMR, the Indian Railways station code for Karimnagar railway station, Telangana, India
