= KCSE =

KCSE may refer to:

- KCSE (FM), a radio station (90.7 FM) licensed to serve Lamar, Colorado, United States
- Kenya Certificate of Secondary Education
