= KQLA =

Radio station in Ogden, Kansas

Coordinates: 39.156°N 96.612°W

- Ogden, Kansas; United States
- Broadcast area: Manhattan, Kansas
- Frequency: 103.5 MHz (HD Radio)
- Branding: Q Country 103.5

Programming
- Format: Country
- Subchannels: HD2: Country Rewind 92.7 (Classic country)

Ownership
- Owner: Eagle Communications

History
- First air date: February 14, 1986

Technical information
- Licensing authority: FCC
- Facility ID: 33565
- Class: C2
- ERP: 41,000 watts
- HAAT: 95 meters (312 ft)
- Translator: HD2: 92.7 K224EX (Manhattan)

Links
- Public license information: Public file; LMS
- Webcast: Listen Live; Listen Live (HD2)
- Website: www.qcountry1035.com 927countryrewind.com (HD2)

KQLA (103.5 FM "Q Country 103.5") is a radio station licensed to Ogden, Kansas. It broadcasts to the Junction City-Manhattan-Fort Riley area broadcasting with an ERP of 41,000 watts. The station is owned by Eagle Communications, which also owns stations KJCK and KJCK-FM, as well as 25 radio stations throughout Kansas, Nebraska and Missouri. Studios are located on West 6th Street in Junction City, with an auxiliary studio located on South 4th Street in Manhattan. KQLA’s transmitter is located on Bagdad Hill in southwest Manhattan.

== History ==
KQLA went on the air at 6 p.m. on February 14, 1986, with a Top 40 format, and competed against (now sister station) KJCK-FM and KMKF. (The station actually began airing construction sounds on February 12, while also conducting initial transmitter tests and generating curiosity in the community about its unannounced future format.) It was owned by Kaw Valley Broadcasting Company. KQLA originally began broadcasting on 103.9 MHz at 3,000 Watts and was branded "Q-104" (an approximation of the original frequency). The station was an affiliate of The Rockin' America Top 30 Countdown, hosted by Scott Shannon. On June 7, 1994, KQLA switched frequencies with KNZA, a station in Hiawatha located on 103.5 MHz. With the frequency change, KQLA shifted their format to hot adult contemporary. KQLA was sold to Platinum Broadcasting (KJCK-FM's owners) on August 1, 1997. Later, the station began airing "Young AC" programming from ABC Radio, which was satellite-fed. This lasted until 2005, when the owners cut the satellite feed and focused on local DJs, and moved towards a mainstream adult contemporary format.

KQLA was the local affiliate for "Intelligence for Your Life" with John Tesh, Tom Kent's programs ("Your Request Show", "The Tom Kent Program", "My 70's Show", and "The Ultimate Party"), "The 70's with Steve Goddard", "American Top 10 with Casey Kasem", "American Gold with Dick Bartley", and "The Retro Pop Reunion with Joe Cortese". During its tenure as an AC station, KQLA played Christmas music between Thanksgiving and Christmas Day.

On October 6, 2011, Platinum Broadcasting announced it was ceasing operations and that KQLA, along with its sister stations, would be sold to Hays-based Eagle Communications, pending FCC approval. The sale was approved on December 15, 2011.

On July 25, 2013, KQLA dropped its Adult Contemporary format and began stunting with Christmas music. On July 29, at 6 a.m., after playing "The Christmas Song" by Al Jarreau, KQLA flipped to country, branded as "Q Country 103.5." The first country song was "Red Solo Cup" at Midnight July 29th, 2013.

KQLA serves as the Manhattan affiliate for The Bobby Bones Show in morning drive, Rick Thomas in middays, operations manager Dan Michaels in afternoons, and Kate at night.

After the passing of Rick Thomas in 2026...DJ Dan moved Kate back to Middays and brought in former KSU Student and past intern Paxton Gordon for nights.

== HD Radio ==
In December 2015, Eagle announced it would acquire translator K224EX (92.7 FM) from the University of Kansas, and would activate HD Radio services for KQLA, with the translator being utilized to re-broadcast an HD sub-channel for the station (in this case, KQLA-HD2). On March 16, 2016, Eagle signed on the translator, and began airing an active rock format branded as Q-Rock 92.7. The translator's transmitter is di-plexed with KQLA's transmitter, which is located on Bagdad Hill on the southwest side of Manhattan. The translator signal is slightly nulled to the west to avoid co-channel interference with KZUH in Salina.

At midnight on April 15, 2019, after playing “You Can’t Kill Rock and Roll” by Ozzy Osbourne, KQLA-HD2/K224EX flipped to classic hits as Q-Prime 92.7. The first song under the new format was “Things Can Only Get Better” by Howard Jones. On January 19, 2021, KQLA-HD2/K224EX flipped to adult album alternative, branded as "92.7 The X."

On March 4, 2022, KQLA-HD2/K224EX flipped to classic country as "92.7 Country Rewind". The format focuses on '90s country hits and acts as a flanker for the main frequency's format.

== Sister stations ==
- KJCK "1420 KJCK The Talk of JC"
- KJCK-FM "Power Hits 97.5"
