= KALN =

KALN may refer to:

- KALN (FM), a radio station (102.5 FM) licensed to serve Dexter, New Mexico, United States
- KIOL, a radio station (1370 AM) licensed to serve Iola, Kansas, United States, which held the call sign KALN from 1991 to 2008
- St. Louis Regional Airport (ICAO code KALN)
