= KCIU =

KCIU may refer to:

- KCIU-LP, a low-power radio station (91.1 FM) licensed to Lawrence, Kansas, United States
- Chippewa County International Airport (ICAO code KCIU)
