= National Association of Farm Broadcasting =

American trade association

- Abbreviation: NAFB
- Formation: May 1944
- Type: 501(c)(6) professional association
- Headquarters: 1100 Platte Falls Road
- Location: Platte City, Missouri, U.S.
- Coordinates: 39.3662°N 94.7797°W
- Members: 700+ professionals
- Official language: English
- 2025 President: Jeff Nalley
- 2026 President-elect: DeLoss Jahnke
- Key people: Tom Brand (Executive Director)
- Main organ: NAFB News Service
- Affiliations: National Association of Broadcasters
- Website: nafb.com
- Remarks: Founded as National Association of Radio Farm Directors (NARFD)

The National Association of Farm Broadcasting (NAFB) is a professional trade association in the United States that serves as a central hub for agricultural communications. Founded in 1944, it bridges the gap between individual farm broadcasters and the broader agribusiness industry.

Member broadcasters provide agricultural programming on more than 1,500 media outlets across the United States.

== History and Founding ==
The organization was established in May 1944 as the National Association of Radio Farm Directors (NARFD) during a meeting of regional broadcasters. Its creation was driven by the rapid increase in farm productivity and the corresponding need for faster dissemination of market data and weather forecasts to rural areas. The association's identity has evolved alongside media technology. It transitioned through names such as the National Association of Television and Radio Farm Directors (NATRFD) in the mid-20th century before adopting its current name in 2005. Historically, the group's members have been credited with bringing critical technology updates and market news to farmers first, long before print publications could reach rural delivery routes.

The NAFB operates several major industry initiatives designed to sustain agricultural media. One of those events is known as Trade Talk. This event, held during the annual national convention in Kansas City, Missouri connects over 100 broadcasters with representatives from agricultural companies for one-on-one interviews.

The association commissions independent studies, such as those conducted by Kynetec Research, to quantify radio consumption among producers. Recent data indicates that the average listener's farming operation may have as many as 20 radios, with over 80% of producers tuning in daily for specific ag-related news.

Beyond its role as a trade group, the NAFB maintains a charitable foundation established in 1977. The foundation has distributed more than $1 million in college scholarships and internship grants to assist students entering the field of agricultural communications.

The association also maintains the NAFB Hall of Fame, which honors pioneers of the industry. Inductees are recognized for long-term excellence in serving rural communities, such as Mark Oppold and other veterans who have provided consistent, trusted voices to the American agricultural sector.

The NAFB also serves television stations through a number of networks, similar to those listed below for radio.

== Networks ==
These radio station networks provide syndicated agricultural news and market reports to hundreds of smaller affiliate stations.

Brownfield Ag News The largest agricultural radio network in the country, featuring a team of 13 NAFB Broadcast Council members. It provides content to more than 600 affiliate stations across the Midwest and the Delta region.

Texas Farm Bureau Radio Network Composed of more than 140 radio stations, it is a leading source of agricultural news for farmers and ranchers in Texas.

Red River Farm Network (RRFN) Serving the Northern Plains, this network includes dozens of affiliate stations across North Dakota, Minnesota, and South Dakota.

Hoosier Ag Today & Michigan Ag Today These networks serve the Eastern Corn Belt and are led by NAFB leadership, including past and current regional vice presidents.

Rural Radio Network A major network in the Central Plains (Nebraska and Colorado) that includes flagship stations like KRVN in Lexington, Nebraska.

== Key radio stations ==
While many stations across the United States carry syndicated agricultural content, several individual stations maintain their own accredited farm departments and are prominent members of the National Association of Farm Broadcasting. Key member stations include KRVN (880 AM) in Lexington, Nebraska, which operates as a farmer-owned cooperative and serves as the flagship for the Rural Radio Network. In the Midwest, KFRM (550 AM) in Salina, Kansas, and WIBW (580 AM) in Topeka are recognized for their full-time agricultural talk and market reporting. Other notable local outlets with dedicated NAFB broadcasters include KICD (1240 AM) in Spencer, Iowa, KASM (1150 AM) in Albany, Minnesota, and WYXY (99.1 FM) in Champaign, Illinois, which is home to NAFB Hall of Fame inductee Gale Cunningham. Additionally, stations such as KFGO (790 AM) in Fargo, North Dakota, and WAXX (104.5 FM) in Eau Claire, Wisconsin, remain active participants in the association's annual programming and professional development sessions.
