= KVDM =

- Hays, Kansas; United States
- Frequency: 88.1 MHz

Programming
- Format: Catholic

Ownership
- Owner: Divine Mercy Radio, Inc.

History
- First air date: 2010

Technical information
- Licensing authority: FCC
- Facility ID: 177158
- Class: A
- ERP: 2,500 watts
- HAAT: 82 meters (269 ft)
- Transmitter coordinates: 38°57′29″N 99°21′07″W

Links
- Public license information: Public file; LMS
- Website: https://www.dvmercy.com/

KVDM (88.1 FM) is a radio station licensed to Hays, Kansas. The station airs a Catholic format and is owned by Divine Mercy Radio, Inc. The station began broadcasting in 2010.

== Simulcast ==
In 2014, Divine Mercy Radio purchased KRTT in Great Bend, Kansas from Florida Public Radio for $62,900, and the station began simulcasting KVDM. KRTT had previously simulcast 101.7 KREJ in Medicine Lodge, Kansas.

Call sign	Frequency	City of license	FID	ERP (W)	HAAT	Class	FCC info
KRTT	88.1 FM	Great Bend, Kansas	173828	900	39 m (128 ft)	A	LMS

In late 2019, Divine Mercy Radio acquired KDJM (101.7 FM) in Salina, which was airing a classic country format, and began broadcasting on that station in May 2020 as KJDM.

In 2020, Divine Mercy Radio acquired the higher-power commercial station KRMR (105.7 FM), which was silent, and began broadcasting over that station, renamed KMDG.
