= KQQF =

- Coffeyville, Kansas; United States
- Frequency: 98.9 MHz
- Branding: Sonshine 98.9

Programming
- Format: Contemporary Christian

Ownership
- Owner: SEK Media, LLC
- Sister stations: KGGF, KGGF-FM, KUSN

History
- First air date: 1983
- Former call signs: KQQF (1983–1991); KUSN (1991–1999); KKRK (1999–2013)

Technical information
- Licensing authority: FCC
- Facility ID: 34460
- Class: A
- ERP: 3,200 watts
- HAAT: 138 metres (453 ft)
- Transmitter coordinates: 37°06′28″N 95°43′22″W

Links
- Public license information: Public file; LMS
- Webcast: Listen Live
- Website: kggfradio.com

KQQF (98.9 FM) is a radio station licensed to serve the community of Coffeyville, Kansas. The station is owned by SEK Media, LLC, and airs a Contemporary Christian format.

The station was assigned the call sign KQQF by the Federal Communications Commission on May 16, 1983. The station changed its call sign to KUSN on August 12, 1991, to KKRK on October 1, 1999, and back to KQQF on August 5, 2013.

In late July 2020, KQQF changed their format from adult contemporary to contemporary Christian, branded as "Sonshine 98.9".
