= KJJP =

High Plains Public Radio station in Amarillo, Texas

- Amarillo, Texas; United States
- Frequency: 105.7 MHz (HD Radio)
- Branding: High Plains Public Radio

Programming
- Format: Public radio; News, Classical music, Jazz
- Subchannels: HD2: HPPR Connect (News, talk)
- Affiliations: National Public Radio; American Public Media; Public Radio International; WFMT

Ownership
- Owner: Kanza Society, Inc.

History
- First air date: December 6, 1991
- Former call signs: KAEZ (1991–2004)

Technical information
- Licensing authority: FCC
- Facility ID: 33273
- Class: C2
- ERP: 43,000 watts
- HAAT: 160 meters (520 ft)
- Transmitter coordinates: 35°17′33″N 101°50′48″W

Links
- Public license information: Public file; LMS
- Webcast: Stream
- Website: hppr.org

KJJP (105.7 FM) is a radio station licensed to Amarillo, Texas. The station is owned by Kanza Society, Inc., and is an affiliate of the High Plains Public Radio network.

== History ==
The station began broadcasting December 6, 1991, airing an easy listening format, and held the call sign KAEZ. It adopted a soft AC format in 1993. In 1999, the station was sold to KXOJ, Inc. for $750,000, and it adopted a Christian contemporary format. The station was branded "The Breeze".

In 2004, the station was sold to Kanza Society Inc. for $1.25 million and it became an affiliate of High Plains Public Radio. On October 8, 2004, its call sign was changed to KJJP. Although Amarillo is the largest urban center in the HPPR coverage area, this was the first time most of the area had received a clear signal from an NPR station. The region had already been served by HPPR repeater KTXP in nearby Bushland, but it operates at only 1,000 watts to protect West Texas A&M University's KWTS at 91.1 FM. KTXP's signal was so weak that HPPR had to install a low-powered translator serving Amarillo itself at 94.9 FM.
