= KXBZ =

- Manhattan, Kansas; United States
- Broadcast area: Salina-Manhattan area
- Frequency: 104.7 MHz
- Branding: B 104.7

Programming
- Format: New Country
- Affiliations: Premiere Radio Networks, Westwood One

Ownership
- Owner: Manhattan Broadcasting Co., Inc.
- Sister stations: KACZ, KBLS, KMAN, KMKF

History
- First air date: 1990
- Former call signs: KTDF (1990–1994)

Technical information
- Licensing authority: FCC
- Facility ID: 37775
- Class: C2
- ERP: 50,000 watts
- HAAT: 148.8 meters
- Transmitter coordinates: 39°15′55″N 96°27′56″W

Links
- Public license information: Public file; LMS
- Webcast: Listen Live
- Website: www.b1047.com

KXBZ (104.7 FM) is a radio station broadcasting a New Country format. Licensed to Manhattan, Kansas, United States, the station serves the Manhattan-Topeka-Salina area.

The station was issued a construction permit as KTDF on May 3, 1990. In August 1994, the station signed on the air with its current country format and "B104.7" branding. The launch marked the first country music station directly targeting Manhattan, and the first on FM (at the time, the nearest country music station to Manhattan was KJCK (AM)). The station changed its call sign to the current KXBZ on September 30. KXBZ became the third station to be part of Manhattan Broadcasting Co., Inc.
