= KBMP =

Bott Radio Network station in Enterprise, Kansas

- Enterprise, Kansas; United States
- Broadcast area: Salina/Manhattan/Abilene/Junction City, Kansas
- Frequency: 90.5 MHz
- Branding: Bott Radio Network

Programming
- Format: Religious
- Affiliations: Bott Radio Network

Ownership
- Owner: Bott Broadcasting Company; (Community Broadcasting, Inc.)
- Sister stations: KCCV-FM

History
- First air date: 2002

Technical information
- Licensing authority: FCC
- Facility ID: 91037
- Class: C2
- ERP: 12,500 watts
- HAAT: 219.9 meters
- Transmitter coordinates: 39°07′54″N 97°19′59″W

Links
- Public license information: Public file; LMS
- Website: KBMP Online

KBMP (90.5 FM, "Bott Radio Network") is a non-commercial educational radio station licensed to serve Enterprise, Kansas, United States. The station, established in 2002, is currently owned by the Bott Broadcasting Company and the broadcast license is held by Community Broadcasting, Inc.

== Programming ==
KBMP broadcasts a religious radio format as part of the Bott Radio Network. The station features Bible teaching plus programming from several Christian news and information sources.

== History ==
This station received its original construction permit for a new FM station broadcasting at 90.5 MHz from the Federal Communications Commission on March 15, 1999. The new station was assigned the call letters KBMP by the FCC on April 30, 1999.

In May 1999, Solid Rock Broadcasting, Inc., reached an agreement to sell the permit for this still-under construction station to the American Family Association. The deal was approved by the FCC on July 13, 1999, and the transaction was consummated on August 17, 1999.

In August 2001, KBMP applied for a main studio waiver allowing the station to be operated and programmed from outside the station's coverage area. On October 31, 2002, the FCC granted this authority to the station. KBMP also received its license to cover from the FCC on October 31, 2002. The station was an affiliate of American Family Radio.

In August 2005, the American Family Association reached an agreement to sell this station to the Bott Radio Network through their Community Broadcasting, Inc., subsidiary as part of a two-station deal valued at $30,000. The deal was approved by the FCC on November 8, 2005, and the transaction was consummated on January 26, 2006.

== Construction permit ==
In September 2007, KBMP applied to the FCC for authorization to upgrade to Class C1 and increase its effective radiated power to 100,000 watts. The FCC granted a construction permit for the changes on November 4, 2008. The permit expired on November 4, 2011.
