= KDCC =

Dodge City, Kansas; United States
- Broadcast area: Southwest Kansas
- Frequency: 1550 kHz

Programming
- Format: Defunct (was sports)
- Affiliations: CBS Sports Radio

Ownership
- Owner: Dodge City Community College
- Sister stations: KONQ

History
- First air date: 1961 (as KEDD)
- Last air date: April 2024
- Former call signs: KEDD (1961–1992)
- Call sign meaning: Dodge City Community College

Technical information
- Licensing authority: FCC
- Facility ID: 17052
- Class: D
- Power: 1,000 watts day; 90 watts night
- Transmitter coordinates: 37°47′14.1″N 100°1′56.5″W

Links
- Public license information: Public file; LMS

KDCC (1550 AM) was a radio station licensed to Dodge City, Kansas, United States, the station served southwest Kansas. The station was last owned by Dodge City Community College.

== History ==
KEDD went on air in 1961. It was owned by Alf Landon and the Seward County Broadcasting Company and broadcast until April 30, 1987. The station was placed in several trusts after Alf Landon's death in 1990 until the trustees sold the station to Dodge City Community College in 1992. KEDD relaunched as KDCC and became sister to the existing FM radio station owned by the college, KONQ 91.9 FM.

Dodge City Community College requested the cancellation of KDCC's license on April 12, 2024. The Federal Communications Commission cancelled the station’s license on April 26, 2024.
