= KSKG =

- Salina, Kansas; United States
- Broadcast area: Salina-Manhattan
- Frequency: 99.9 MHz (HD Radio)
- Branding: 99KG

Programming
- Format: Country
- Subchannels: HD2: 94.5 KG Prime FM (Classic hits); HD3: K-Love (Contemporary Christian)

Ownership
- Owner: Eagle Communications, Inc.
- Sister stations: KINA, KJCK-FM

History
- First air date: 1961
- Former call signs: KAFM

Technical information
- Licensing authority: FCC
- Facility ID: 58645
- Class: C1
- ERP: 100,000 watts
- HAAT: 174.0 meters (570.9 ft)
- Transmitter coordinates: 38°47′36.00″N 97°31′33.00″W
- Translators: HD2: 94.5 K233CF (Abilene); HD3: 96.9 K245BN (Salina)

Links
- Public license information: Public file; LMS
- Website: streamdb7web.securenetsystems.net/ce/index.cfm?stationCallSign#61;kskg2

KSKG (99.9 FM, "99KG") is a radio station broadcasting a country music format. Licensed to Salina, Kansas, United States, the station serves the Salina-Manhattan area. The station is currently owned by Eagle Communications, Inc.

== History ==
The first FM station in the Salina market, KSKG went on the air in 1961 using the call letters KAFM (Keeping Alive Fine Music). The original owner was Wayne Pollard dba Salina F-M, Inc. Pollard built the first studios on the top floor of the United Building in downtown Salina and would broadcast a full service format with 3.6 KW of power. The station became KSKG in September 1970; in December of that year, it switched to a Top 40 format. During this time, the station adopted the nickname "99KG".

On August 26, 1996, at 6 a.m., KSKG switched to a country format and was re-branded "Eagle Country 99.9". The first song under the country format was "Sweet Country Music" by Atlanta. The "99KG" moniker was brought back in 2008. KSKG's sister station in Salina is KINA. KSKG is an affiliate of the Kansas City Chiefs radio network and the Bobby Bones Show.

== Air Personalities (Past and Present) ==
- Bart Starr
- The Beaver
- Bill Ray
- Bill Weaver
- Brad King
- Cabana Boy
- Casey Garrett
- Cody Matthews
- Danielle Marshall
- Dave Bradley
- Dave "The Doctor of Music" Lourie
- Devin Hanney
- Denny Collier
- Greg Martin also went by "Murphy"
- Hal Headley
- Jack Armstrong
- Jack Daniels
- Jay "The Jammer" Jeffries
- Jeff Travis
- Katie Conn, the future Miss Kansas
- Leigh Ann Adam
- Lisa Fox
- Mark Alexander
- Mark Davis
- Mark "In The Dark" McKay
- Mark Spencer
- Nervous Nate
- Nikki Nicole
- Radio Meaghan
- "Radio Ray" Pollard
- Randy McKay
- Rick Raynes
- Rocky Romance
- Rusty Keys
- Scotty Woodson
- Shane McClintock
- Shane Sellers
- Stephen Edwards
- Steve Davis
- Steve Wall
- Steve Stanley
- Tennessean Ian
- The Worm
- Travis Dodge
- Shawna Marie
