= KJML =

- Columbus, Kansas; United States
- Broadcast area: Joplin, Missouri
- Frequency: 107.1 MHz
- Branding: Rock 107.1

Programming
- Format: Active rock

Ownership
- Owner: American Media Investments Inc.

History
- First air date: December 25, 1982 (as KBLT)
- Former call signs: KBLT (1982–1988); KMOQ (1988–2008); KJML (2008–2009); KBZI (2/2009-11/2009)

Technical information
- Licensing authority: FCC
- Facility ID: 64435
- Class: C3
- ERP: 11,500 watts
- HAAT: 149 meters
- Transmitter coordinates: 37°13′15″N 94°42′22″W

Links
- Public license information: Public file; LMS
- Webcast: Listen live
- Website: rock1071.com

KJML (107.1 FM) is a radio station broadcasting an active rock format. Licensed to Columbus, Kansas, United States, the station serves the Joplin area. The station is owned by American Media Investments Inc.

== History ==
The station went on the air on December 25, 1982 as KBLT. On October 10, 1988, the station changed its call sign to KMOQ as "Q 107". The station then remained under the CHR format and KMOQ call sign but changed the name to Power 107, which featured The Morning Playhouse with Howie Baby. On January 18, 2008 the KMOQ call sign and the CHR format were swapped with the KJML call sign and active rock format that had been broadcast on 105.3 FM in Columbus. On February 19, 2009, the call sign was changed to KBZI which had been on the now defunct 100.7 FM frequency. The format never ended up changing from the active rock to the Hot AC that had been on 100.7 FM and the call sign was quickly changed back to KJML on November 16, 2009. KJML had been at 105.3 before that it was KOCD CD105.3 which now is called CD103.7 and is licensed to Okemah, Oklahoma.
