= KXNC =

KXNC-FM
- Ness City, Kansas; United States
- Broadcast area: Hays, Kansas
- Frequency: 104.7 MHz
- Branding: Kiss 104.7

Programming
- Language: English
- Format: Contemporary hit radio

Ownership
- Owner: Post Rock Radio
- Sister stations: KKDT

History
- First air date: November 21, 2009; 16 years ago

Technical information
- Licensing authority: FCC
- Facility ID: 164131
- Class: C1
- ERP: 16,500 watts
- HAAT: 273 meters
- Transmitter coordinates: 38°36′32″N 99°42′11″W

Links
- Public license information: Public file; LMS
- Webcast: Listen live
- Website: mytown-media.com/stations/kiss-104-7-kxnc-fm/

KXNC (104.7 FM, "Kiss 104.7") is a radio station broadcasting a contemporary hit radio format. Licensed to Ness City, Kansas, United States, it serves the Hays, Kansas and Great Bend, Kansas area. The station is currently owned by Post Rock Radio, a division of MyTown Media, LLC based in Pittsburg, Kansas.
