= KIKS-FM =

- Iola, Kansas; United States
- Broadcast area: Pittsburg
- Frequency: 101.5 MHz
- Branding: Kiks Country

Programming
- Format: Country
- Affiliations: Fox News Radio

Ownership
- Owner: Christofer Shank; (Ad Astra per Aspera Broadcasting, Inc.)
- Sister stations: KIOL

History
- Call sign meaning: KIcKS

Technical information
- Licensing authority: FCC
- Facility ID: 29046
- Class: C3
- ERP: 11,500 watts
- HAAT: 88.0 meters
- Transmitter coordinates: 37°53′53.00″N 95°24′32.00″W

Links
- Public license information: Public file; LMS
- Webcast: Listen Live
- Website: iolaradio.com

KIKS-FM (101.5 MHz) is a radio station broadcasting a country format. Licensed to Iola, Kansas, United States, it serves the Pittsburg market. The station is currently owned by Christofer Shank, through licensee Ad Astra per Aspera Broadcasting, Inc.
