= KSNP (FM) =

- Burlington, Kansas; United States
- Broadcast area: Flint Hills
- Frequency: 97.7 MHz
- Branding: The Dawg

Programming
- Format: Classic rock

Ownership
- Owner: Murfin Media
- Sister stations: KANS, KEKS, KHDL

History
- First air date: 1990 (at 95.3)
- Former frequencies: 95.3 MHz (1990–2002)

Technical information
- Licensing authority: FCC
- Facility ID: 12206
- Class: C2
- ERP: 17,200 watts
- HAAT: 178 meters (584 feet)
- Transmitter coordinates: 38°09′57″N 95°32′19″W

Links
- Public license information: Public file; LMS
- Webcast: Listen live
- Website: rockofkansas.com

KSNP (97.7 FM, "The Dawg") is a radio station licensed to serve Burlington, Kansas, United States. The station, which began broadcasting in 1990, is currently owned by Murfin Media.

KSNP broadcasts a classic rock music format to the Flint Hills region of eastern Kansas.

== History ==
This station received its original construction permit from the Federal Communications Commission on October 31, 1989. The new station was assigned the call letters KSNP by the FCC on January 23, 1990. KSNP received its license to cover from the FCC on April 15, 1992.

In February 1999, Coffey County Broadcasting Company reached an agreement to sell the station to Southeast Kansas Broadcasting Company, Inc. The deal was approved by the FCC on April 26, 1999, and the transaction was completed on June 25, 1999.

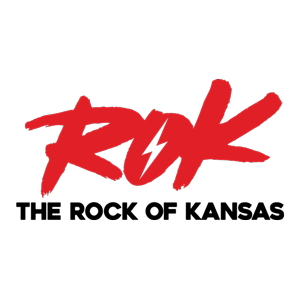
Previous logo

In March 2026, the station rebranded from The Dawg to The Rock of Kansas, as part of a network of Murfin Media stations also including KIND-FM/Elk City–Independence, KKOY-FM/Chanute, KSEK/Pittsburg, and KKLE/Winfield. In August 2026, the stations dropped the "Rock of Kansas" branding due to a cease and desist from Audacy, Inc. for trademark infringement over the "Rock of Kansas" slogan (which it owns in connection to KQRC-FM), quietly returning to its prior name of The Dawg.
