= KMAN =

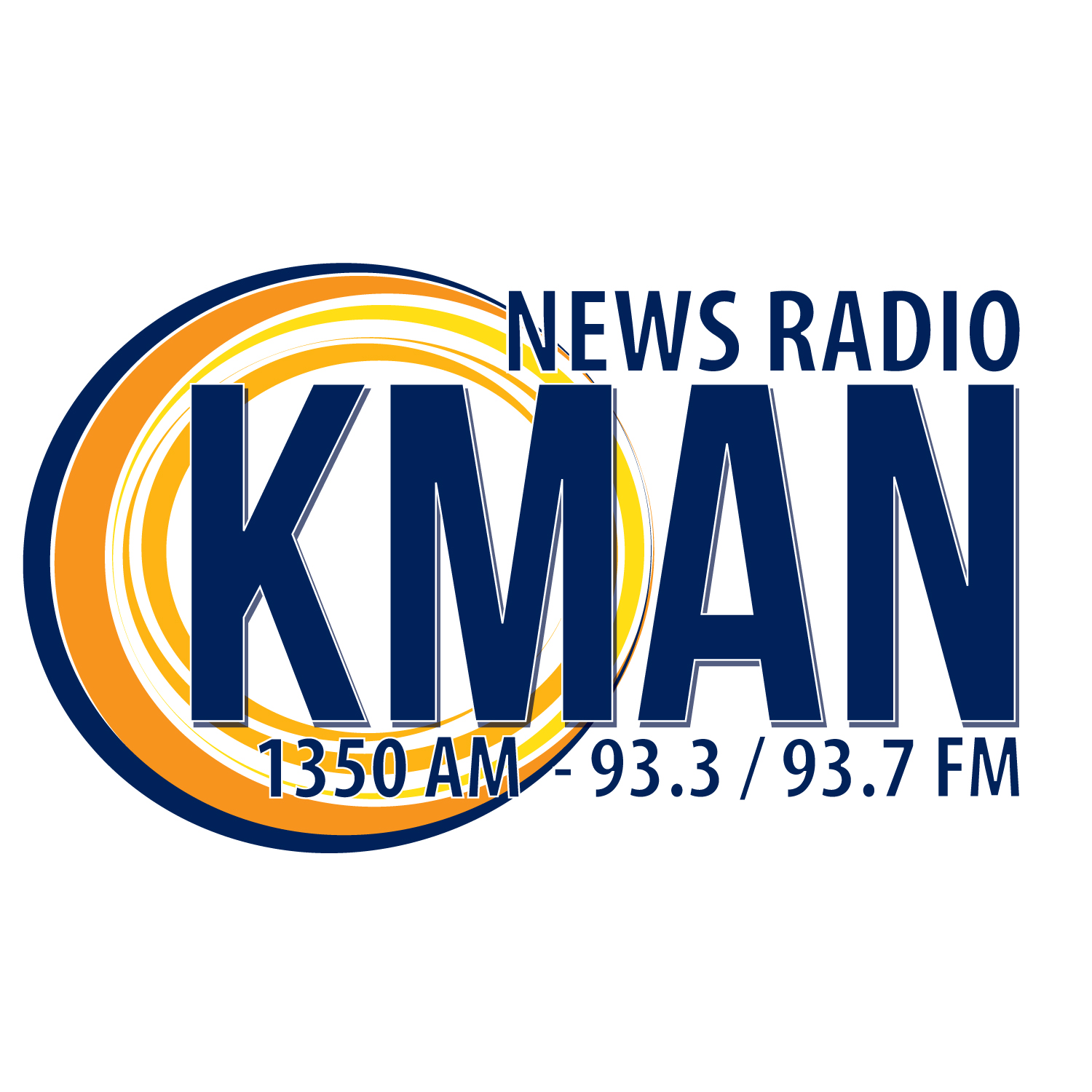
- Manhattan, Kansas; United States
- Broadcast area: Salina - Manhattan
- Frequency: 1350 kHz
- Branding: News Radio KMAN

Programming
- Format: Talk radio
- Affiliations: CBS News Radio

Ownership
- Owner: Manhattan Broadcasting Co.
- Sister stations: KACZ, KBLS, KMKF, KXBZ

History
- Call sign meaning: Manhattan

Technical information
- Licensing authority: FCC
- Facility ID: 39783
- Class: D
- Power: 500 watts (day); 40 watts (night)
- Transmitter coordinates: 39°13′0″N 96°33′30″W
- Repeaters: 93.3 K227CX (Manhattan); 93.7 K229CW (Wamego)

Links
- Public license information: Public file; LMS
- Webcast: Listen live
- Website: Official website

KMAN (1350 AM) is a commercial radio station licensed to Manhattan, Kansas, United States, serving the Salina-Manhattan area. Currently owned by Manhattan Broadcasting Co., it broadcasts a talk format, featuring programing from CBS News Radio, ESPN Radio, Compass Media Networks, Premiere Networks, and Westwood One.
