= KZDY =

Coordinates: 39°30′29″N 98°18′57″W

- Cawker City, Kansas; United States
- Broadcast area: Beloit, Kansas; Downs, Kansas
- Frequency: 96.3 MHz
- Branding: Z96.3 The Lake

Programming
- Format: Classic rock
- Affiliations: ABC News Radio

Ownership
- Owner: Dierking Communications, Inc.
- Sister stations: KDNS

History
- First air date: 1999

Technical information
- Licensing authority: FCC
- Facility ID: 87228
- Class: C3
- ERP: 13,000 watts
- HAAT: 70 meters (230 ft)

Links
- Public license information: Public file; LMS
- Webcast: Listen live
- Website: z963thelake.com

KZDY (96.3 FM) is a radio station licensed to Cawker City, Kansas. The station broadcasts a classic rock format and is owned by Dierking Communications, Inc.

Former logo

On March 31, 2025, KZDY changed their format from adult contemporary to classic rock, still under the "Z96.3 The Lake" branding.
