= KGGF (AM) =

Radio station in Coffeyville, Kansas

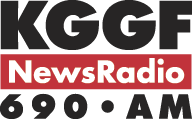
- Coffeyville, Kansas; United States
- Broadcast area: Southeast Kansas, Eastern Oklahoma, Southwest Missouri, Northwest Arkansas
- Frequency: 690 kHz
- Branding: News Radio 690AM

Programming
- Format: Talk radio
- Affiliations: Fox News Radio; Premiere Networks; Salem Radio Network; Westwood One

Ownership
- Owner: Sek Media, LLC
- Sister stations: KGGF-FM, KQQF, KUSN

History
- First air date: 1930

Technical information
- Licensing authority: FCC
- Facility ID: 34462
- Class: B
- Power: 10,000 watts (day); 5,000 watts (night)
- Transmitter coordinates: 37°8′47″N 95°28′42″W
- Translator: 92.7 K224FQ (Coffeyville)

Links
- Public license information: Public file; LMS
- Webcast: Listen live
- Website: kggfradio.com

KGGF (690 AM) is a commercial radio station licensed to Coffeyville, Kansas, United States. It airs a talk radio format and is owned by Sek Media, LLC. The studios are on West 8th Street in Coffeyville. KGGF's transmitter is a Harris DX-10 installed in 1997; KGGF uses a two-tower array in the day and a four-tower array at night, located off Clay Road.

KGGF features local news, farm reports and talk shows on weekdays, with nationally syndicated conservative talk hosts afternoons and nights.

== History ==
In 1930, KGGF first signed on the air. It transmitted with 1,000 watts and had to share time with other stations on its original frequency of 1010 kilocycles.

On March 18, 1932, the Federal Radio Commission authorized moving the KGGF studios from South Coffeyville, Oklahoma, to Coffeyville, Kansas. The studios were at the corner of 8th and Elm Streets. The owner was Hugh J. Powell.

In the 1930s, 1010 kHz was a regional channel. The station later got a boost to 5,000 watts maximum and 500 watts minimum. In 1941, with the enactment of North American Regional Broadcasting Agreement (NARBA), KGGF was reassigned to 690 kHz, a Canadian clear channel frequency. It was authorized to run 50,000 watts maximum and 250 watts minimum, provided the station was 650 miles, or more, from the Canada–US border. Simultaneously, 1010 became a new Canadian clear channel frequency, assigned to Calgary while 690 was assigned to Montreal and later to Tijuana, Mexico.

In October 1947, the Federal Communications Commission approved the sale of KGGF from Hugh J. Powell to The Midwest Broadcasting Company for $400,000.

In 1983, an FM station was added at 98.9 MHz. In 1991, Mahaffey Enterprises acquired KGGF-AM-FM for $750,000.
