= KMOQ =

- Columbus, Kansas; United States
- Broadcast area: Joplin, Missouri
- Frequency: 105.3 MHz
- Branding: Classic Rock 105.3

Programming
- Format: Classic rock

Ownership
- Owner: American Media Investments, Inc.

History
- First air date: 1985 (as KSSC)
- Former call signs: KSSC (1985–1987); KSSC-FM (1987–1990); KOCD (1990–1997); KJML (1997–2008)

Technical information
- Licensing authority: FCC
- Facility ID: 408
- Class: C3
- ERP: 13,600 watts
- HAAT: 93 meters
- Transmitter coordinates: 37°7′58″N 94°41′38″W

Links
- Public license information: Public file; LMS
- Website: KMOQ Online

KMOQ (105.3 FM) is a radio station broadcasting a classic rock format. Licensed to Columbus, Kansas, United States, the station serves the Joplin area. The station is currently owned by American Media Investments, Inc.

== History ==
On April 3, 1985, the station was assigned the call sign KSSC which was modified to KSSC-FM on May 7, 1987. The call sign was changed to KOCD on January 12, 1990, and then to KJML on August 15, 1997.

On January 18, 2008, the KJML call sign along with the Active Rock format was swapped with the KMOQ call sign and contemporary hit format that had been broadcast on 107.1 FM in Columbus.

On October 18, 2010, KMOQ changed formats to contemporary Christian, branded as "New Life Radio".

In January 2022, KMOQ changed formats from contemporary Christian to classic rock, branded as "Classic Rock 105.3".
