= KJDM =

- Lindsborg, Kansas; United States
- Broadcast area: Salina, Kansas
- Frequency: 101.7 MHz

Programming
- Format: Catholic

Ownership
- Owner: Divine Mercy Radio, Inc.
- Sister stations: KVDM/KMDG Hays, KRTT Great Bend

History
- First air date: 2008
- Former call signs: KDJM (2008–2020)

Technical information
- Licensing authority: FCC
- Facility ID: 164240
- Class: C3
- ERP: 15,500 watts
- HAAT: 125.0 meters (410.1 ft)
- Transmitter coordinates: 38°40′0″N 97°41′30″W

Links
- Public license information: Public file; LMS

KJDM (101.7 FM) is a radio station licensed to Lindsborg, Kansas, United States. The station is currently owned by Divine Mercy Radio, Inc., and broadcasts a Catholic radio format.

== KDJM history ==
The station was previously owned by Radioactive LLC and operated by Rocking M Media, broadcasting a classic country format under the call sign KDJM. Effective January 16, 2020, KDJM was sold to Divine Mercy Radio for $340,000.

On February 17, 2020, the station changed its call sign to KJDM.
