= KGGF-FM =

- Fredonia, Kansas; United States
- Frequency: 104.1 MHz
- Branding: KGGF 104.1

Programming
- Format: Oldies

Ownership
- Owner: Sek Media, LLC
- Sister stations: KGGF, KQQF, KUSN

History
- First air date: 1995-11-30 (as KJGM)
- Former call signs: KJGM (1995–1997)

Technical information
- Licensing authority: FCC
- Facility ID: 34461
- Class: C3
- ERP: 7,300 watts
- HAAT: 163 meters
- Transmitter coordinates: 37°22′31″N 95°43′41″W

Links
- Public license information: Public file; LMS
- Webcast: Listen Live
- Website: KGGF-FM's website (within www.kggfradio.com)

KGGF-FM (104.1 FM) is a radio station broadcasting an oldies format. Licensed to Fredonia, Kansas, United States, the station is currently owned by Sek Media, LLC.

== History ==
The station went on the air as KJGM on 1995-11-30. On 1997-05-23, the station changed its call sign to the current KGGF-FM.
