= KJCK-FM =

Radio station in Junction City, Kansas

- Junction City, Kansas; United States
- Broadcast area: Manhattan-Fort Riley
- Frequency: 97.5 MHz
- Branding: Power Hits 97-5

Programming
- Language: English
- Format: Contemporary hit radio

Ownership
- Owner: Eagle Communications

History
- First air date: July 22, 1965
- Call sign meaning: "Junction City Kansas"

Technical information
- Licensing authority: FCC
- Class: C1
- ERP: 100,000 watts
- HAAT: 192 meters (630 ft)
- Transmitter coordinates: 39.015°N 96.870°W

Links
- Public license information: Public file; LMS
- Webcast: Listen live
- Website: powerhits975.com

KJCK-FM (97.5 FM, "Power Hits 97.5") is a radio station licensed to Junction City, Kansas, featuring a contemporary hit radio format. Owned by Eagle Communications, the station also serves Manhattan and Fort Riley, as well as some portions of the Topeka and Salina areas.

KJCK-FM is a Class C1 FM station. It has an effective radiated power (ERP) of 100,000 watts, the maximum for most FM stations. KJCK-FM's studios are located on West 6th Street in Junction City, with an auxiliary studio on South 4th Street in Manhattan, and its transmitter is located on the west side of Junction City, near the site of their former studios.

== History ==
=== Early years ===
KJCK-FM signed on the air on July 22, 1965. It broadcast on 94.5 MHz and was owned by the Junction City Broadcasting Company, and was a simulcast of KJCK 1420 AM. This continued until the mid-1970s, when the two stations split their programming. The FM side continued with a Top 40 format, while the AM flipped to country on June 2, 1980.

Steven Roesler bought the stations in 1983. Platinum Broadcasting bought the station in 1986.

By the late 1980s, KJCK-FM was known as "Power 94.5", and competed against KQLA in Manhattan until that station was also acquired by Platinum in 1997. By the late 1990s, KJCK-FM's moniker was changed to "The Big Kat 94.5". In 2002, the station gained a competitor when KACZ signed on the air, also with a Top 40 format, albeit with a more adult-oriented direction.

=== Frequency move ===
KJCK-FM moved from 94.5 to 97.5 in September 2002 after a station on 97.3 FM was relocated from Moberly, Missouri to Kansas City, which caused several other stations across Kansas to change frequencies. (Country music station WIBW-FM in Topeka currently occupies the 94.5 frequency.) KJCK-FM, now at 97.5 MHz, retained "The Big Kat" moniker after the move.

On April 1, 2005, the station changed its name to "Power Hits 97-5", which was partially intended as an April Fool's Day joke. The music direction was changed, as KJCK-FM began playing more adult-friendly content during the day, while relegating harder-edged content (such as hip-hop and R&B tracks) after 6 pm. This was done to compete against KACZ, who also had an adult-leaning Top 40 format. A new wake-up show, "Stooks In The Morning", debuted in May 2005.

=== Transmitter fire ===
On March 25, 2007, at around 11 pm, KJCK went off the air due to a fire in the transmitter. The transmitter went back on a few hours later; however, the coverage area was reduced down to at least a 6-mile radius. Manhattan residents and some residents in Fort Riley were not able to pick up the station. Stooks in the Morning did a web-only show for part of the week, while on 97.5, it was a "best-of" show. Everyone else took the day off. That Thursday afternoon/evening, the station went back to its original coverage area. Some criticized that the days they were off the air were Justin Carson's last days before moving to KZCH in Wichita the following week. Justin's last day was on Friday, March 30 (he returned in August 2008, but left by September 2009).

During the early morning hours of Saturday, May 19, 2007 the secondhand transformer which replaced the original transformer that had caused the fire ceased to function correctly. KJCK-FM again operated at extremely low power until the following Monday afternoon when a new transformer was installed. On January 11, 2008, the station put in a new transmitter which includes the most up to date technology.

=== New ownership and program director ===
In August 2007, the station started leaning rhythmic again, as most of the adult-friendly content was removed. During this time, new program director Robert Elfman was hired, as former PD and morning show host Matt Stooks left in June.

On October 6, 2011, Platinum Broadcasting announced it would sell KJCK-AM-FM to Eagle Communications, based in Hays, Kansas. The sale was approved by the Federal Communications Commission on December 15, 2011.
