= KPBL =

Hemphill, Texas; United States
- Broadcast area: Lufkin-Nacogdoches
- Frequency: 1240 kHz
- Branding: Lakes Area Country Radio

Programming
- Format: Defunct (formerly country music)

Ownership
- Owner: Philburr

History
- First air date: 1983

Technical information
- Facility ID: 58471
- Class: C
- Power: 1,000 watts day 1,000 watts night
- Transmitter coordinates: 31°22′3.00″N 93°50′10.00″W

KPBL (1240 AM, Lakes Area Country Radio) was a radio station broadcasting a country music format. Licensed to Hemphill, Texas, United States, the station served the Lufkin-Nacogdoches area. The station was owned by Philburr.

The station's license expired on August 1, 2013, due to the station failing to file an application for renewal.
