= KVSV (AM) =

- Beloit, Kansas; United States
- Broadcast area: North-Central Kansas
- Frequency: 1190 kHz
- Branding: KVSV Radio AM1190

Programming
- Format: Full-service

Ownership
- Owner: McGrath Publishing Company
- Sister stations: KVSV-FM

History
- First air date: November 21, 1979
- Call sign meaning: "Voice of the Solomon Valley"

Technical information
- Licensing authority: FCC
- Facility ID: 60773
- Class: D
- Power: 2,300 watts (day); 90 watts (night)
- Transmitter coordinates: 39°26′53.0″N 98°4′45.0″W
- Translator: 102.9 K275CS (Beloit)

Links
- Public license information: Public file; LMS
- Website: kvsvradio.com

KVSV is a full service formatted broadcast radio station licensed to Beloit, Kansas, serving North-Central Kansas. KVSV is owned and operated by McGrath Publishing Company.

1190 AM is a United States and Mexican clear-channel frequency.
