= KMKF =

- Manhattan, Kansas; United States
- Broadcast area: Salina-Manhattan
- Frequency: 101.5 MHz
- Branding: 101.5 K-Rock

Programming
- Format: Mainstream rock
- Affiliations: United Stations Radio Networks

Ownership
- Owner: Manhattan Broadcasting Company
- Sister stations: KACZ, KBLS, KMAN, KXBZ

History
- First air date: September 1, 1972
- Former frequencies: 101.7 MHz (1972-1990)

Technical information
- Licensing authority: FCC
- Facility ID: 39784
- Class: C2
- ERP: 37,000 watts
- HAAT: 176 meters (577 ft)
- Transmitter coordinates: 39°15′54.98695″N 96°27′57.00341″W

Links
- Public license information: Public file; LMS
- Webcast: Listen Live
- Website: 1015krock.com

KMKF (101.5 FM) is a radio station licensed to Manhattan, Kansas, and serves the eastern portion of the Salina-Manhattan radio market. The station is currently owned by Manhattan Broadcasting Company.

KMKF, along with sister station KMAN, is the flagship station of the K-State Sports Network, airing Kansas State University Football and Men's Basketball games. The station also airs the locally produced "Powercat Gameday" program, as well as the radio shows of both football head coach Bill Snyder and basketball coach Jerome Tang.

KMKF is part of Manhattan Broadcasting Company, which also owns and operates KMAN (News Talk/Sports), KXBZ (Hot Country), KACZ (Top 40), and KBLS (Adult Contemporary). MBC also provides an ever-increasing digital presence, with video facilities in their recently expanded offices.

Corey Reeves began his radio career at MBC on-air with K-Rock (as "Cadillac" Corey Dean), working up to co-hosting the morning show until 2012. He then became Operations Manager, getting promoted to General Manager in November 2015. Andrea Besthorn is the Sales Manager for the company.

KMKF went on the air on September 1, 1972, at 101.7 MHz. The station initially aired a Top 40/CHR format.

KMKF changed frequencies to 101.5 MHz at 5 p.m. on October 22, 1990. On the same day, KMKF dropped the Top 40/CHR format for its current rock format, branded as "K-Rock." The first song on "K-Rock" was "Rock and Roll" by Led Zeppelin.

== Former Staff ==
- Jason Sellers
- Kylie Powers
- Jared O'Neal
- Glazier
- Shawn Rock
- Drewcifer
- "Scarface" Jeremy Weiland
- "Doc" Rock
- Jason Schlitz
- Chris Taylor
- Raubin Pierce
- Marty Meyers
- Jeff Wilson
- Shane Sellers
- Lucas Fox
- Scott Hoch
- Steve Anthony
- Andy Crowl
- Frank Sereno
- Gary Dean
