= KHDL =

- Americus, Kansas; United States
- Broadcast area: Emporia, Kansas
- Frequency: 99.5 MHz
- Branding: "Thunder Country 99.5"

Programming
- Format: Country

Ownership
- Owner: Robert Young
- Sister stations: KANS, KEKS, KSNP

Technical information
- Licensing authority: FCC
- Facility ID: 191544
- Class: A
- ERP: 6,000 watts
- HAAT: 83 metres (272 ft)
- Transmitter coordinates: 38°17′37″N 96°13′3″W

Links
- Public license information: Public file; LMS
- Webcast: Listen Live
- Website: Official Website

KHDL (99.5 FM) is a radio station licensed to serve the community of Americus, Kansas, United States. The station is owned by Robert Young, and airs a country music format.

The station was assigned the KHDL call letters by the Federal Communications Commission on June 20, 2016.
