= KBLS =

- North Fort Riley, Kansas; United States
- Broadcast area: Salina-Manhattan area
- Frequency: 102.5 MHz
- Branding: Sunny 102.5

Programming
- Format: Adult contemporary
- Affiliations: Premiere Networks

Ownership
- Owner: Manhattan Broadcasting Co., Inc.
- Sister stations: KACZ, KMAN, KMKF, KXBZ

History
- First air date: January 1, 1993

Technical information
- Licensing authority: FCC
- Facility ID: 65598
- Class: C1
- ERP: 100,000 watts
- HAAT: 150 meters (490 ft)
- Transmitter coordinates: 38°57′5″N 96°47′45″W

Links
- Public license information: Public file; LMS
- Webcast: Listen live
- Website: sunny1025.com

KBLS (102.5 FM, "Sunny 102.5") is a radio station broadcasting an adult contemporary format. Licensed to North Fort Riley, Kansas, United States, it serves the Salina-Manhattan area. It is currently owned by Manhattan Broadcasting Co., Inc.

== History ==
KBLS went on the air January 1, 1993 from studios at 2nd and Broadway in downtown Abilene. Morning programming was live with a local announcer. Veteran radio personality John Anderson did the morning show for almost 20 years. Following the morning show, the station switched to the Jones Radio Network via satellite for the rest of the day. For its first three months, KBLS operated as an LMA (Lease Management Agreement) between EBC, Inc. (owned by J. K. Vanier and Jerry Hinrikus of Salina, KS) and Steckline Communications of Wichita. It was subsequently owned outright by EBC.

Morris Communications acquired KBLS in January 2004 as part of a six-station purchase from EBC. Morris sold its stations to Alpha Media in 2015. Alpha then sold the stations to Rocking M Media, which spun off KBLS to Manhattan Broadcasting in 2016.
