= KLKC-FM =

Radio station in Parsons, Kansas

- Parsons, Kansas; United States
- Broadcast area: Parsons, Pittsburg and surrounding Southeast Kansas communities
- Frequency: 93.5 MHz
- Branding: V93 FM

Programming
- Format: Hot AC
- Affiliations: Zach Sang Show, Intelligence For Your Life

Ownership
- Owner: Wayne Gilmore, Greg Chalker and Kirby Ham; (Parsons Media Group, LLC)
- Sister stations: KLKC-AM

History
- First air date: October 6, 1978

Technical information
- Licensing authority: FCC
- Facility ID: 65566
- Class: A
- ERP: 3,000 watts
- HAAT: 81 meters (266 ft)
- Transmitter coordinates: 37°20′35.00″N 95°13′55.00″W

Links
- Public license information: Public file; LMS
- Webcast: Listen Live
- Website: klkcradio.com

KLKC-FM (93.5 FM, "V93") is a radio station broadcasting a hot adult contemporary format. Licensed to Parsons, Kansas, United States, it serves the Pittsburg area. The station is currently owned by Wayne Gilmore, Kirby Ham and Greg Chalker, through licensee Parsons Media Group, LLC.

== Previous logo ==
(KLKC-FM's logo under previous "Max FM" branding)
