= KINA =

- Salina, Kansas; United States
- Broadcast area: Salina-Manhattan
- Frequency: 910 kHz

Programming
- Format: News/talk
- Affiliations: Fox News Radio; Compass Media Networks; Genesis Communications Network; Premiere Networks; USA Radio Network; Westwood One; Motor Racing Network; Performance Racing Network; Salina Liberty

Ownership
- Owner: Eagle Communications, Inc.
- Sister stations: KSKG

History
- Former call signs: KLSI

Technical information
- Licensing authority: FCC
- Facility ID: 60660
- Class: D
- Power: 500 watts day 29 watts night
- Transmitter coordinates: 38°45′52.01109″N 97°32′31.12065″W
- Translator: 107.5 K298CZ (Salina)

Links
- Public license information: Public file; LMS
- Webcast: Listen Live
- Website: 910kina.com

KINA (910 AM) is a radio station broadcasting a news/talk format. Licensed to Salina, Kansas, United States, the station serves Salina and communities to the northwest. The station is currently owned by Eagle Communications.

KINA originally went on the air in April 1964 as KLSI. Missouri disk jockey Sam Bradley fought with Kansas broadcaster Sherwood Parks over the original construction permit (CP) for almost 6 years beginning around 1958 until the two agreed to put the station on the air jointly in 1964 with Grover Cobb and Cobb's mother Ruth as stockholders. The call letters would change to KINA in September 1970. Parks would buy out his partners in February 1979 and then sold KINA late the same year to a group of Topeka businessmen, dba Smoky Hill Broadcasting. In 1995 Hays-based Eagle Communications, the current owner, acquired KINA.

The broadcast studios were initially located at 108 E. Walnut in downtown Salina and programmed Top-40 music to a teen audience and the servicemen at Schilling Air Base, which was still operational in 1964. By the late 1970s KINA was broadcasting country music. In 1980 studios were moved around the corner to 203 S. Santa Fe and would remain there until the late 1990's when they would consolidate with sister station KSKG in the Southgate Shopping Center on south Ohio Street.

KINA's dial position at 910 kHz would prove troublesome, as it was exactly on the second harmonic of radios with a 455 kHz IF (intermediate frequency). This resulted in an annoying tone or whistle in the background of the station's programming on home radios. This problem has since been overcome with modern digital radios.

Under the current news and talk format, KINA currently airs such syndicated talk shows as The Chris Plante Show, Markley, VanCamp, and Robbins Show, The Sean Hannity Show, The Mark Levin Show, as well as two local talk shows and Red Eye Radio overnights and a variety of shows on the weekends. KINA is also a radio affiliate of the Kansas City Chiefs.
