= KHAZ =

- Hays, Kansas; United States
- Frequency: 99.5 MHz
- Branding: Real Country - 99 KZ Country

Programming
- Format: Country music

Ownership
- Owner: Eagle Communications, Inc.

Technical information
- Licensing authority: FCC
- Facility ID: 18073
- Class: C1
- ERP: 100,000 watts
- HAAT: 157 meters (515 ft)
- Transmitter coordinates: 38°56′33″N 99°21′20″W

Links
- Public license information: Public file; LMS
- Webcast: Listen live

KHAZ is a radio station airing a country music format licensed to Hays, Kansas, broadcasting on 99.5 FM. The station is owned by Eagle Communications, Inc.
