= KFIX =

- Plainville, Kansas; United States
- Broadcast area: Western Kansas
- Frequency: 96.9 MHz

Programming
- Format: Classic rock

Ownership
- Owner: Hull Broadcasting

History
- First air date: 1986

Technical information
- Licensing authority: FCC
- Facility ID: 77331
- Class: C2
- ERP: 10,500 watts
- HAAT: 267 meters
- Transmitter coordinates: 39°01′15″N 99°28′12″W

Links
- Public license information: Public file; LMS
- Webcast: Listen live
- Website: kfix.com

KFIX (96.9 FM) is a radio station based in the area of Hays, Kansas, United States, with a classic rock format. It is owned by Hull Broadcasting.
