= KIOL =

- Iola, Kansas; United States
- Broadcast area: Southeast Kansas
- Frequency: 1370 kHz

Programming
- Format: Classic hits
- Affiliations: Fox News Radio; Fox Sports Radio; Compass Media Networks; Premiere Networks; Salem Radio Network; Westwood One

Ownership
- Owner: Christofer Shank; (Ad Astra per Aspera Broadcasting, Inc.)
- Sister stations: KIKS-FM

History
- Call sign meaning: Iola, Kansas

Technical information
- Licensing authority: FCC
- Facility ID: 29047
- Class: D
- Power: 500 watts day 58 watts night
- Transmitter coordinates: 37°53′53.00″N 95°24′28.00″W
- Translator: 99.3 K257GM (Iola)

Links
- Public license information: Public file; LMS
- Webcast: Listen Live
- Website: iolaradio.com

KIOL (1370 AM) is a radio station broadcasting a classic hits format. The station's previous call sign was KALN, prior to August 12, 2008. Licensed to Iola, Kansas, United States, the station serves Southeast Kansas. The station is currently owned by Christofer Shank, through licensee Ad Astra per Aspera Broadcasting, Inc., and features programming from Fox News Radio, Fox Sports Radio, Compass Media Networks, Premiere Networks, Salem Radio Network, and Westwood One.
