= KQNK-FM =

- Norton, Kansas; United States
- Frequency: 106.7 MHz
- Branding: Classic Hits Q106.7

Programming
- Format: Classic hits
- Affiliations: ABC News Radio

Ownership
- Owner: Dierking Communications, Inc.
- Sister stations: KQNK

History
- First air date: March 1, 1993

Technical information
- Licensing authority: FCC
- Facility ID: 52680
- Class: C3
- ERP: 21,000 watts
- HAAT: 109 meters (358 ft)
- Transmitter coordinates: 39°47′51″N 99°53′29″W

Links
- Public license information: Public file; LMS
- Webcast: Listen live
- Website: kqnk.com

KQNK-FM (106.7 MHz) is a radio station licensed to Norton, Kansas, United States. The station airs a classic hits format, and is currently owned by Dierking Communications, Inc.

Former logo
