= KANS =

- Emporia, Kansas; United States
- Broadcast area: Lyon County, Kansas and surrounding counties
- Frequency: 96.1 MHz
- Branding: 96.1 Bob FM

Programming
- Format: Adult hits
- Affiliations: Bob FM network

Ownership
- Owner: Bill Wachter; (My Town Media, Inc.)
- Sister stations: KEKS, KHDL, KSNP

History
- First air date: February 21, 1990 (as KGZF)
- Former call signs: KGZF (1990–1997); KRWV (1997–2003); KANS-FM (2003)
- Former frequencies: 99.5 MHz (1990–2004)
- Call sign meaning: Kansas

Technical information
- Licensing authority: FCC
- Facility ID: 41542
- Class: A
- ERP: 6,000 watts
- HAAT: 97 meters
- Transmitter coordinates: 38°24′21″N 96°14′13″W

Links
- Public license information: Public file; LMS
- Webcast: Listen Live
- Website: Official website

KANS (96.1 FM) is a radio station broadcasting an adult hits format, licensed to Emporia, Kansas. The station is currently owned by Bill Wachter, through licensee My Town Media Inc.

== History ==
Former logo as "The Wave"

The station went on the air as KGZF on February 21, 1990. On May 1, 1997, it changed its call sign to KRWV; on August 18, 2003 to KANS-FM; and on September 9, 2003 to the current KANS.

On July 1, 2023, KANS dropped its longtime adult contemporary format (as "96 one The Wave") and flipped to adult hits, airing the "Bob FM" format from G Networks.
