= KKQY =

- Hill City, Kansas; United States
- Broadcast area: Hays, Kansas
- Frequency: 101.9 MHz
- Branding: The Country Bull - Y 102

Programming
- Format: Country music

Ownership
- Owner: Eagle Communications, Inc.

Technical information
- Licensing authority: FCC
- Facility ID: 54891
- Class: C1
- ERP: 97,000 watts
- HAAT: 303 meters (994 ft)
- Transmitter coordinates: 39°01′15″N 99°28′15″W

Links
- Public license information: Public file; LMS
- Webcast: Listen live

KKQY is a radio station airing a country music format licensed to Hill City, Kansas, broadcasting on 101.9 FM. The station serves the Hays, Kansas area, and is owned by Eagle Communications, Inc.
