= KEKS =

- Olpe, Kansas; United States
- Broadcast area: Emporia, Kansas
- Frequency: 103.1 MHz (HD Radio)
- Branding: KISS 103.1

Programming
- Languages: English and Spanish
- Format: Contemporary hit radio
- Subchannels: HD2: Country

Ownership
- Owner: Murfin Media; (MyTown Media, LLC.)
- Sister stations: KANS, KHDL, KSNP

History
- First air date: 2007
- Call sign meaning: Kiss-FM, Emporia, Kansas (postal abbreviation)

Technical information
- Licensing authority: FCC
- Facility ID: 166016
- Class: A
- ERP: 2,450 watts
- HAAT: 96 meters (315 ft)
- Transmitter coordinates: 38°17′37″N 96°13′03″W

Links
- Public license information: Public file; LMS
- Webcast: Listen live
- Website: murfinmedia.com/kiss-103-1

KEKS (103.1 FM "KISS 103.1") is a radio station owned by Murfin Media licensed to Olpe, Kansas. The station serves the Emporia, Kansas area and broadcasts a bilingual CHR format, airing music and programs in both English and Spanish.

== History ==
KEKS signed on in November 2006 as a CHR station under the ownership of Andrew Wachter. KEKS quickly transformed into an adult contemporary station as "Channel 103.1" in 2007, then reverted to CHR in 2008. My Town Media bought the station in 2012. KEKS signed on an HD2 channel simulcasting KSNP originally. After a stint with country music as "My Country 94.1" (which was broadcast on translator station K231AY (94.1 FM), before it was relocated to Wichita), the HD2 subchannel currently simulcasts sister station KHDL (99.5 FM), which initially aired ESPN Radio programming until its flip to country as "My Country 99.5" on October 1, 2019.
