= KLKC (AM) =

Radio station in Parsons, Kansas, United States

- Parsons, Kansas; United States
- Broadcast area: Pittsburg, Kansas
- Frequency: 1540 kHz
- Branding: Fox Sports 106.7 FM

Programming
- Format: News/Talk, Sports
- Affiliations: Fox Sports Radio

Ownership
- Owner: Wayne Gilmore and Greg Chalker; (Parsons Media Group, LLC)
- Sister stations: KLKC-FM

History
- First air date: October 26, 1948
- Call sign meaning: Labette Kansas County

Technical information
- Licensing authority: FCC
- Facility ID: 12832
- Class: D
- Power: 250 watts day 1 watt night
- Transmitter coordinates: 37°20′35.20″N 95°13′55.90″W
- Translator: 106.7 K294DE (Parsons)

Links
- Public license information: Public file; LMS
- Webcast: Listen live
- Website: klkcradio.com

KLKC (1540 AM) is a radio station broadcasting a sports and news/talk format licensed to Parsons, Kansas, United States. It serves the Pittsburg area. The station is currently owned by Wayne Gilmore and Greg Chalker through licensee Parsons Media Group, LLC.

== History ==
KLKC signed on October 26, 1948. It was owned by a group of local residents organized as the Community Broadcasting Company and broadcast with 250 watts during daytime hours only. The Sun Publishing Company acquired a majority stake in the station in 1950, with Carol B. Combs acquiring a majority stake in 1954. Combs moved the station from its initial home in the Faye Hotel to new quarters in the First National Bank building.

In June 1978, the Federal Communications Commission awarded a construction permit for KLKC to build a companion FM station, utilizing the existing studios and AM transmitter site, and to begin as a simulcast of the daytime AM outlet. KLKC-FM 93.5 began broadcasting on October 6 of that year. Also in 1978, Carol Combs retired from the station at the age of 85; she continued to own it until her death in 1996 at the age of 103.

The station remained at the First National Bank building for 35 years. However, in 1986, storm damage prompted the FM station to be unable to telecast in stereo. In 1989, KLKC built new studios and offices at the transmitter site, restoring FM stereo capability. The two stations continued to broadcast an adult contemporary format, with the FM simulcasting 80 percent of the AM's programming. The station moved studios and offices to 1812 Main Street in Parsons in 2006 and has remained at the location ever since.

After not being sold in nearly 50 years, KLKC went through two sales in a three-year span. In 2004, Acme Broadcasting bought the AM and FM outlets for $250,000. A year later, the Southeast Kansas Independent Living Resource Center, which owned KSEK-AM-FM in the Pittsburg area, acquired KLKC-AM-FM for nearly $335,000.

In 2015, the Southeast Kansas Independent Living Resource Center sold its Pittsburg and Parsons stations to different owners. Parsons Media Group, owned by Wayne Gilmore and former station employee Greg Chalker, acquired the KLKC stations for $30,000; the seller also received five 30-second commercial ads per day on the stations for a period of two years. By that time, the 1540 AM frequency was airing a classic country format known as "Katy Country". The buyers executed a time brokerage agreement to immediately begin programming both stations.

On January 1, 2016, KLKC changed its format from classic country to sports, with programming from Fox Sports Radio. Local and national sports had long been a part of KLKC's programming; former FCC chairman Ajit Pai has recalled listening to the Kansas City Royals in the 1985 World Series and to high school basketball games on KLKC AM, and he has frequently mentioned KLKC in advocating for revitalization of the AM band.

== Translator ==
In November 2018, KLKC AM began broadcasting over translator K294DE (106.7 FM), which is located on its AM transmitter tower; the translator signed on just after KLKC's 70th anniversary.

== Programming ==
KLKC airs national Fox Sports Radio programming as well as play-by-play of the Kansas City Royals and Kansas Jayhawks and Labette County High School sporting events. It also airs some non-sports programs, including "Doctor on Call" and "Cardinal Corner".
