= KREJ =

- Medicine Lodge, Kansas; United States
- Frequency: 101.7 MHz

Programming
- Format: Christian Radio

Ownership
- Owner: Smile FM
- Sister stations: KSNS

History
- First air date: 1989
- Call sign meaning: Keep Ready Expecting Jesus

Technical information
- Licensing authority: FCC
- Facility ID: 21791
- Class: C2
- ERP: 50,000 watts
- HAAT: 145 meters (476 ft)
- Transmitter coordinates: 37°14′02″N 98°39′45″W

Links
- Public license information: Public file; LMS
- Website: https://www.krejksns.org/

KREJ (101.7 FM) is a Christian radio station licensed to Medicine Lodge, Kansas, United States. The station is owned by Smile FM

KREJ's programming includes Christian Talk and Teaching programs including; Revive our Hearts with Nancy DeMoss Wolgemuth, Turning Point with David Jeremiah, Focus On The Family, Unshackled!, Enjoying Everyday Life with Joyce Meyer, and Love Worth Finding with Adrian Rogers, along with Christian music.

On May 28, 2025, the FCC approved the sale of KREJ and KSNS to Smile FM, due to the licensee unable to fully maintain the stations.

KREJ was also formerly heard on full powered station 90.3 KNJT in Coldwater, Kansas, until Florida Public Radio surrendered KNJT's license to the Federal Communications Commission on January 8, 2023, and it was cancelled.
