= KCLY =

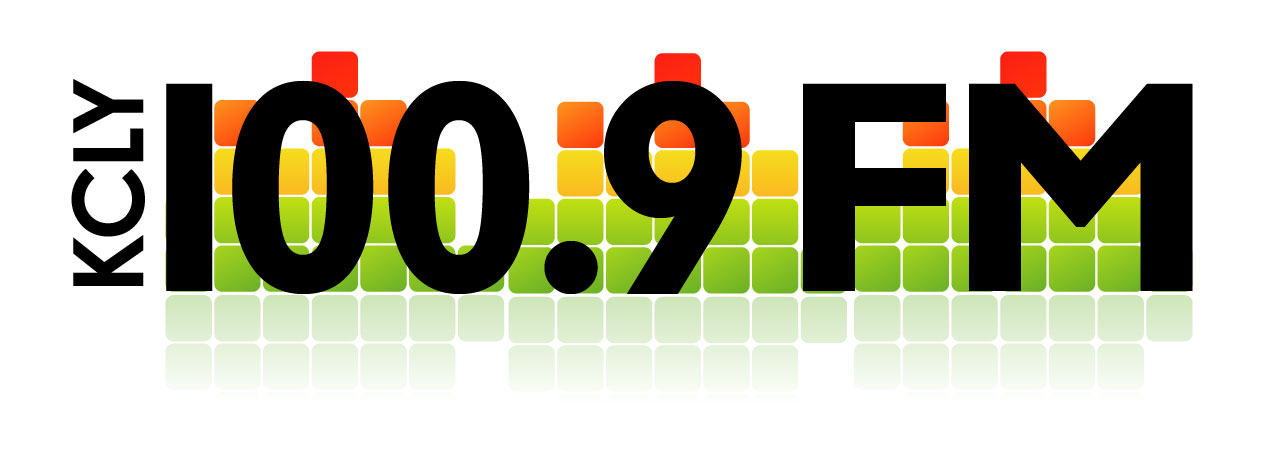
- Clay Center, Kansas; United States
- Frequency: 100.9 MHz
- Branding: Radio for Grown-Ups

Programming
- Format: Variety/Full-Service
- Affiliations: Associated Press Radio Network

Ownership
- Owner: Taylor Communications
- Sister stations: KFRM AM 550

History
- Call sign meaning: Clay Center

Technical information
- Licensing authority: FCC
- Facility ID: 64650
- Class: C2
- ERP: 35,500 watts
- HAAT: 177 meters
- Transmitter coordinates: 39°28′3″N 97°3′45″W

Links
- Public license information: Public file; LMS
- Webcast: Listen Live (MP3); Listen Live (ASX)
- Website: Official website

KCLY (100.9 FM) is a radio station based out of Clay Center, Kansas, United States. It has operated since 1978 under the ownership of Taylor Communications. KCLY broadcasts local programming, including news, sports and weather. KCLY's sister station is KFRM, also owned by Taylor Communications.

== Content ==
KCLY markets itself to a "grown-up" audience, playing a variety of contemporary, country, and Christian artists from the 70s, 80s, and 90s. The station also has morning, noon, and evening reporting of local news, weather, and sports, including play-by-play sports coverage during the school year.

KCLY is an affiliate of the Kansas State University Sports Network and Kansas City Chiefs Radio Network, providing game coverage throughout the year.

== Community ==
KCLY has held an annual business expo in the spring since 1981, providing an opportunity for interaction between area consumers and businesses.

== Awards ==
The Kansas Association of Broadcasters (KAB) named KCLY a "Station of the Year" in 1999, 2000, and 2009.

In 2002, KAB awarded KCLY sports director Rocky Downing with the Hod Humiston Award for Sports Broadcasting.

In 2008, KCLY received an award from the Kansas Department of Commerce.
