= KACZ =

Coordinates: 39.226°N 96.617°W

- Riley, Kansas; United States
- Broadcast area: Manhattan-Junction City-Fort Riley
- Frequency: 96.3 MHz
- Branding: Z 96-3

Programming
- Language: English
- Format: Top 40 (CHR)

Ownership
- Owner: Manhattan Broadcasting Company
- Sister stations: KBLS, KMAN, KMKF, KXBZ

History
- First air date: September 16, 2002

Technical information
- Licensing authority: FCC
- Facility ID: 88543
- Class: C3
- ERP: 12,500 watts
- HAAT: 145 meters

Links
- Public license information: Public file; LMS
- Website: http://www.z963.com/

KACZ (96.3 FM, "Z 96.3") is a Top 40 (CHR) formatted radio station owned by Manhattan Broadcasting Company. The station is broadcast from Manhattan, Kansas, with an ERP of 12.5 kW with its COL as Riley, Kansas. The station serves the Manhattan-Junction City-Fort Riley area, as well as portions of Northeast Kansas. Their slogan is "The #1 Hit Music Station."

KACZ is part of Manhattan Broadcasting Company, which also owns KMAN (News Talk/Sports), KXBZ (Hot Country), KMKF (Rock), and KBLS (Adult Contemporary). Matt Walters serves as the General Manager and Andrea Besthorn is the Sales Manager. Chris Swick is KACZ's Program Director.

== Programming ==
Currently, the station airs Elvis Duran and the Morning Show. The station has aired the show since early 2014, replacing "Kidd Kraddick in the Morning" shortly after Kraddick's untimely death. The airstaff also features Treyvion (10a-2p), Swick (2p-7p), and Auh'shay (7p-12a). Weekend programming includes the "American Top 40 Countdown".
