= KNCK (AM) =

- Concordia, Kansas; United States
- Broadcast area: Cloud County, Kansas
- Frequency: 1390 kHz
- Branding: Concordia Radio

Programming
- Format: Classic hits
- Affiliations: CBS News Radio; Jones Radio

Ownership
- Owner: Barbara White; (White Communications, LLC)
- Sister stations: KNCK-FM

History
- First air date: 1954
- Call sign meaning: K North Central Kansas

Technical information
- Licensing authority: FCC
- Facility ID: 35210
- Class: D
- Power: 500 watts (day); 54 watts (night)
- Transmitter coordinates: 39°33′58.0″N 97°41′4.0″W
- Translator: 98.3 K252EY (Concordia)

Links
- Public license information: Public file; LMS
- Webcast: Listen Live
- Website: www.ncktoday.com

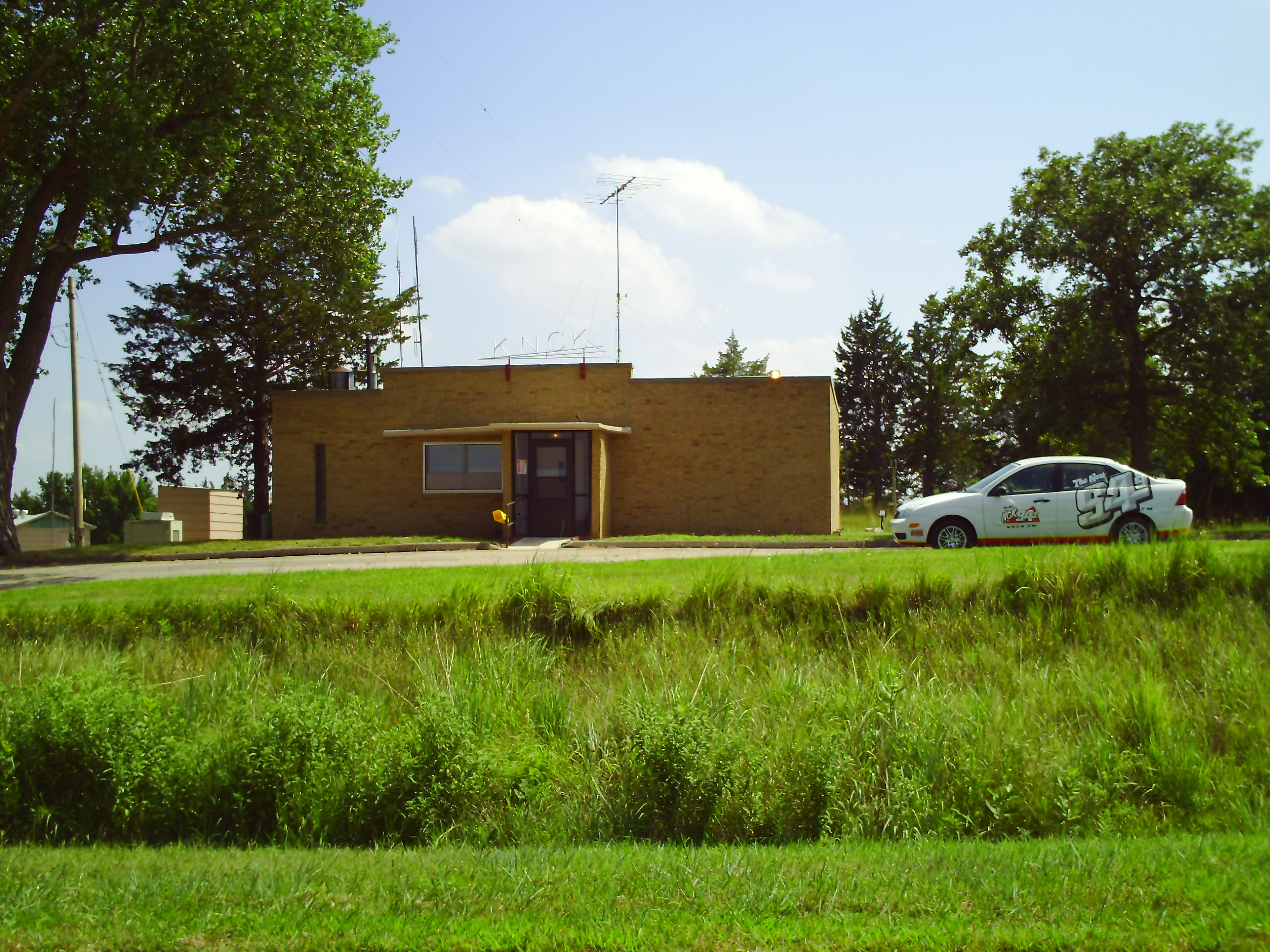
Broadcast headquarters

KNCK (1390 kHz) is a classic hits music formatted AM radio station licensed to Concordia, Kansas, serving Concordia and Cloud County, Kansas. KNCK is owned and operated by Barbara White, through licensee White Communications, LLC. The station derives a portion of its programming from Jones Radio Network's "Kool Gold" Network.

== History ==
Local businessman Charles Cook, who made his fortune by starting a brick manufacturing plant called Cloud Ceramics, helped start KNCK in 1954.

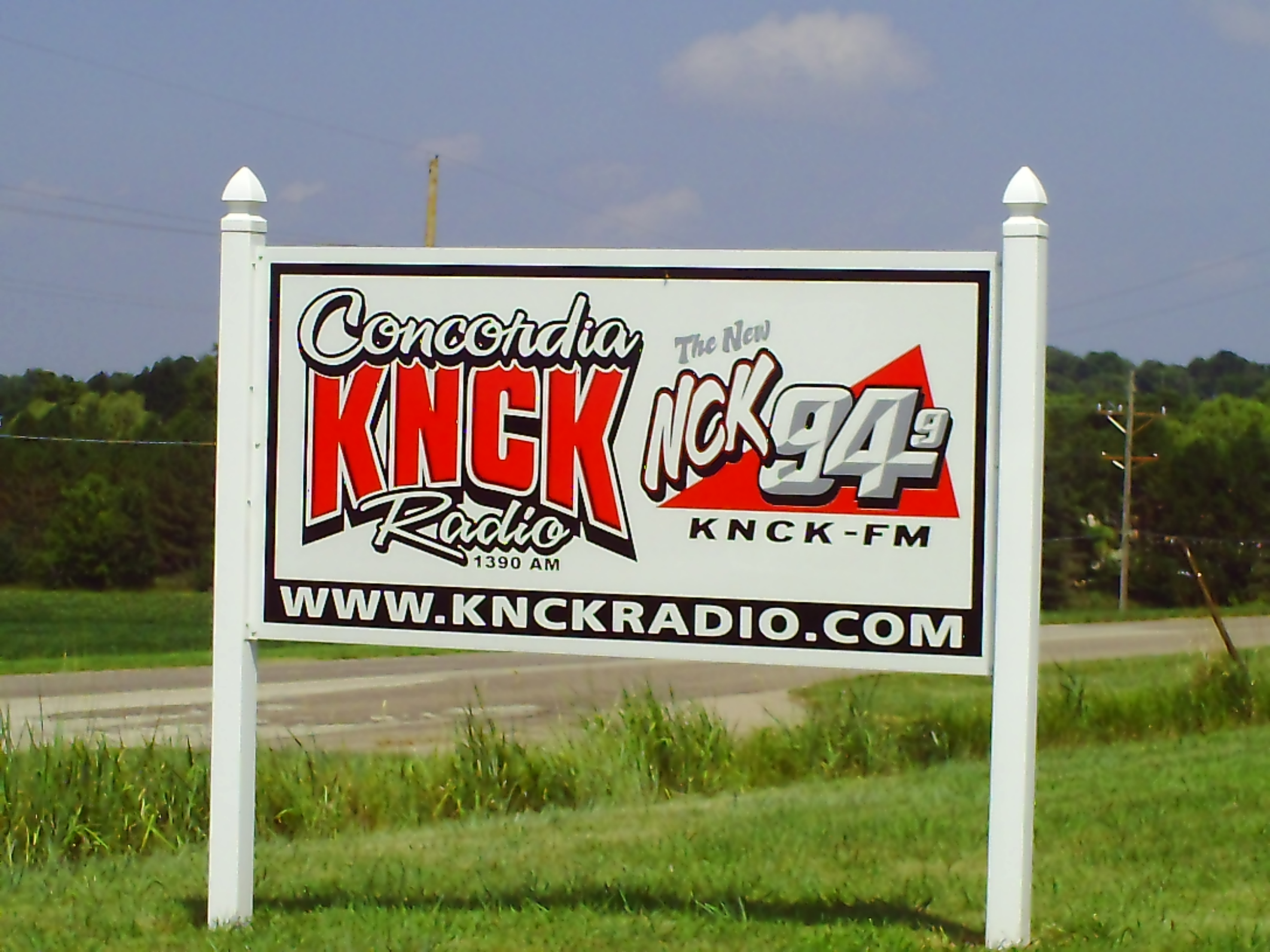
KNCK Road Sign

== See also ==
- KNCK-FM
