= KFRM =

- Salina, Kansas; United States
- Frequency: 550 kHz

Programming
- Format: Full-service, agricultural News and classic country
- Affiliations: Salem Radio Network; USA Radio News

Ownership
- Owner: Taylor Communications, Inc.
- Sister stations: KCLY

History
- First air date: 1947
- Former call signs: KNNN (1986); KICT (1986–1987)
- Call sign meaning: "Farm"

Technical information
- Licensing authority: FCC
- Facility ID: 25808
- Class: D
- Power: 5,000 watts (day); 110 watts (night)
- Transmitter coordinates: 39°26′4″N 97°39′38.1″W

Links
- Public license information: Public file; LMS
- Webcast: Listen live (MP3); Listen live (ASX)
- Website: www.kfrm.com

KFRM (550 AM) is a commercial radio station licensed to Salina, Kansas, United States. It is owned by Taylor Communications, Inc. KFRM has studios and offices in Clay Center. On weekdays, KFRM carries mostly news and agricultural information shows for farming communities. Nights and weekends it plays classic country music.

Due to its low position on the dial, KFRM enjoys a wide coverage area during the day. The transmitter is off U.S. Route 81 (140th Road) in Concordia. KFRM is powered at 5,000 watts by day, using a directional antenna aimed toward the southwest. It puts a high quality signal over most of Central Kansas, including Wichita. A fair signal is delivered to Oklahoma City. However, it is hard to hear in Kansas City. To avoid interfering with other stations on AM 550, KFRM drops its power to 110 watts at night, when radio waves travel further. After sunset, the station's signal is restricted to communities in and around Salina.

The station is a key member of the National Association of Farm Broadcasting.

== History ==
KFRM was founded by Arthur B. Church, a prominent broadcaster and the president of Midland Broadcasting company, operators of KMBC radio. He had founded Midland Broadcasting in 1927 and over the years built KMBC into a high-quality full service radio station. KFRM maintained a fully staffed farm news department, complete with an 800-acre service farm, a multi-reporter local and regional news operation, home economics department, and comprehensive sports reporting. The station staff, including 30 full-time musicians and vocalists, sometimes numbered up to 130.

The Federal Communications Commission issued a construction permit on August 19, 1946, for a 5,000-watt daytimer radio station with the transmitter located in Cloud County, Kansas. The FCC permit was issued to Midland Broadcasting Company, which would plan to extend KMBC programming into central and western Kansas with a satellite station on 550 kc. broadcasting from North Central Kansas. KMBC would plan to feed its programming audio over telephone lines 175 miles west to the KFRM transmitter site. Midland Broadcasting initially maintained a fully staffed farm news department for KFRM, which included an 800-acre service farm and comprehensive news operations.

KFRM signed on the air on Sunday, December 7, 1947. For the next fourteen years, the KMBC-KFRM team would bring high quality broadcasting to rural Kansas. The programming would emanate from the KMBC studios, on the 10th and 11th floors of the Pickwick Hotel, at 10th and McGee streets in downtown Kansas City, Missouri.

In June 1954, KFRM was sold to Cook Paint & Varnish Company. In January 1961, it was announced that KFRM would be sold to Norman E. Kightlinger and Associates, a furniture dealer and real estate and insurance agent. His major partner was investor C.B. McNeil of Tulsa. The sale to the new owners, KFRM, Inc., was approved by the FCC in August 1961.

In 1965, there would be both an ownership change, and a format change for KFRM. There had been four partners in KFRM, Inc., but in September of that year, the FCC approved the sale of the station to C.B. McNeil himself, as he bought out the interests of the other partners. At the time of the ownership change, it was announced that the format of the station would change to that of country music. However, a tragic accident one week later would significantly affect the KFRM ownership and programming plans. On October 7, the 47-year-old McNeil would be killed in a crash of his light airplane near Tulsa, Oklahoma.

In May 1966, the executor of the McNeil estate filed an application with the FCC to sell the stock of KFRM, Inc. to JACO, Inc., whose major stockholders were M. Crawford Clark and James C. Treat. They were executives at radio station KOOO in Omaha, Nebraska, which was owned by broadcaster John Bozeman, better known by his on-air stage name, Mack Sanders. The station was known during this period for its live broadcasts featuring performers like Sanders' own "Ranch Boys" band.

Kansas agri-business broadcaster Larry Steckline, who would later become one of Kansas' most prominent and influential broadcasters, began his radio career with KFRM, for several years. In 1977, following an abrupt dismissal from KFRM (due to sale of the station), Steckline created his own "Mid America Ag Network" (Wichita, Kansas), a syndication of his "ag-news" shows state-wide, and beyond—and eventually acquired dozens of radio stations throughout Kansas.

In 1977, Mack Sanders purchased a radio station in Nashville, where he also owned a home. He announced that he had sold both KFRM and his Wichita FM station, KICT-FM, to Great Plains Radio, Inc., a subsidiary of the Peoria Journal-Star newspaper that also owned other radio properties.

In March 1985, the sale of KFRM was announced to the general partner of Compass Communications, a California organization. The sale was approved by the FCC in December 1985, and in that same month, Compass applied for the call letters of KNNN to replace the nearly forty-year-old KFRM call sign. Later, in 1986, Compass again changed call letters, this time to KICT.

Compass then announced they were selling all their stations, and KICT-AM 550 was sold in July 1987, to HRH Broadcasting Corp., Herb and Ruby Hoeflicker, who immediately applied to the FCC to change the call letters back to KFRM. On Wednesday, October 21, 1987, KFRM 550 AM returned to the air.

Then next sale of KFRM came on February 15, 1991, when the FCC approved the sale from HRH Broadcasting Co to Great American Broadcasting, Inc., of Kansas, headed by Mack and Sherry Sanders. Sanders had, of course, operated KFRM before, from 1967-1978. Two years later, Sanders filed for bankruptcy protection for Great American, and on May 3, 1993, he sought to assign the KFRM license back to HRH Broadcasting. Sanders died later that year at the age of 80.

In August 1996, HRH Broadcasting announced the sale of KFRM to Taylor Communications, Inc. of Clay Center, Kansas. The studios and offices were moved to Clay Center in September 1996, where Taylor Communications also operated KCLY-FM. Taylor Communications Incorporated, led by owner and general manager Kyle Bauer, negotiated the purchase of KFRM and took over operations on September 30, 1996. Bauer, a graduate of Kansas State University's College of Agriculture, transitioned the station to its current full-time farm talk format, dedicated exclusively to agricultural news, markets, and weather information. The station's studios and offices are now located in Clay Center, Kansas.
