= KKDT =

Coordinates: 38°36′32″N 99°42′11″W

- Burdett, Kansas; United States
- Broadcast area: Western Kansas
- Frequency: 93.5 MHz
- Branding: Thunder Country 93.5

Programming
- Format: Country music

Ownership
- Owner: Murfin Media, LLC

Technical information
- Licensing authority: FCC
- Facility ID: 164130
- Class: C1
- ERP: 95,000 watts
- HAAT: 304.8 meters (1,000 ft)

Links
- Public license information: Public file; LMS
- Webcast: Listen live
- Website: mycountry935.com

KKDT 93.5 FM is a radio station licensed to Burdett, Kansas. The station broadcasts a country music format and is owned by Murfin Media, LLC.
