= KNDY (AM) =

- Marysville, Kansas; United States
- Broadcast area: Marysville, Kansas, extending into Beatrice, Nebraska
- Frequency: 1570 kHz
- Branding: Classic Country FM 94.1 KNDY

Programming
- Format: Classic country
- Affiliations: ABC News Radio

Ownership
- Owner: Dierking Communications, Inc.

History
- Call sign meaning: K ANDY Grauer, original station manager.

Technical information
- Licensing authority: FCC
- Facility ID: 16913
- Class: D
- Power: 250 watts day 33 watts night (AM)
- ERP: 250 watts on 94.1 MHz (FM)
- Transmitter coordinates: type:city 39°51′28.00″N 96°38′56.00″W
- Translator: 94.1 K231AX (Marysville)

Links
- Public license information: Public file; LMS
- Webcast: Listen Live
- Website: kndyradio.com

KNDY (1570 kHz) is a commercial AM radio station in Marysville, Kansas that plays classic country music as well as local news, weather, and sports coverage. The station signed on the air July 10, 1956 and celebrated 50 year s of broadcasting in July 2006 by moving into a new broadcast studio with sister-station KNDY-FM 95.5.

Former logo

On May 2, 2011, the station signed on Translator K231AX on 94.1 MHz operating at 250 watts. The translator station repeats all programming from 1570 kHz and covers Marshall County, Kansas.

== Newscasts ==
Monday–Friday

- KNDY Morning News (7:00–8:00 am)
- KNDY Midday News (12:00–1:00 pm)
- KNDY Evening News (5:00–6:00 pm)

Saturday

- KNDY News Saturday Morning (7:00–8:00 am)

Sunday

- KNDY News Sunday Morning (8:00–8:15 am)
- KNDY Public Affairs (8:15–8:30 am)
- KNDY News Midday Sunday (midnight – 12:15 am)
- KNDY Public Affairs (Repeat) (12:15–12:30 pm)

== Sports programming ==
KNDY 1570 AM is an affiliate of the Learfield Sports Kansas State Wildcats radio network. The station features play by play of K-State football and men's basketball. For many years, 1570 AM was home to local high school football and basketball until KNDY-FM 95.5 signed on in 1974. With the addition of translator K231AX in 2011 Marysville High School football and boys and girls basketball will return to KNDY AM 1570/FM 94.1.
