= KQNK (AM) =

- Norton, Kansas; United States
- Frequency: 1530 kHz
- Branding: Superstar Country 102.5 & 1530

Programming
- Format: Country
- Affiliations: ABC News Radio

Ownership
- Owner: Dierking Communications, Inc.
- Sister stations: KQNK-FM

History
- First air date: October 30, 1963 (as KNBI)
- Former call signs: KNBI (1963–1978)

Technical information
- Licensing authority: FCC
- Facility ID: 52681
- Class: D
- Power: 1,000 watts day
- Transmitter coordinates: 39°49′37″N 99°52′08″W
- Translator: 102.5 K273DE (Norton)

Links
- Public license information: Public file; LMS
- Webcast: Listen Live
- Website: kqnk.com

KQNK (1530 kHz) is an AM radio station licensed to Norton, Kansas, United States. The station airs a gold-based country music format, and is currently owned by Dierking Communications, Inc.

== History ==
KQNK was originally licensed on 6 April 1964 as KNBI. The original license was issued to Norton broadcasting, Inc. (per the FCC History cards).

In 1965, the news department of KNBI reported that UFOs had been spotted in the Norton area.

As of 1969, the station was affiliated with the Mutual Broadcasting System.

In 1971, the license was transferred to Kansas-Nebraska Broadcasters, Inc.

In 1973, Tim Adrian, AG director of KNBI asked to be considered as the replacement for Earl Butz as agriculture secretary, who had recently resigned. Rep. Keith Sebelius said he would pass the name onto then President Gerald R. Ford.

In 1974, the license was transferred to Prairie Dog Broadcasting Company.

In 1975, the station tower was hit by lightning, and knocked off the air for more than a day, according to Dave Tucker, the owner of the station.

In 1978, the license returned to Norton Broadcasting Inc. and the call sign was changed to the current KQNK.

By 1980, the license was controlled by Pioneer Country Broadcasting, Inc. who operated the radio station for about 20 years.

In 1999, the license was transferred to Bruce Dierking, the current licensee.

Former logo

== Awards ==
In 1973, KNBI was awarded an honor certificate from the Freedoms Foundation for producing a 15-minute broadcast talking to people about why they are proud of Norton.
