= KNCK-FM =

- Concordia, Kansas; United States
- Broadcast area: Concordia, Kansas; Belleville, Kansas; Minneapolis, Kansas; Beloit, Kansas
- Frequency: 94.9 MHz
- Branding: The New NCK 94.9

Programming
- Format: Hot adult contemporary
- Affiliations: ABC Radio

Ownership
- Owner: Barbara White; (White Communications, LLC)
- Sister stations: KNCK

History
- First air date: 1979 (as KCKS-FM at 95.3)
- Former call signs: KCKS-FM (1979–2010)
- Former frequencies: 95.3 MHz (1979–2010)
- Call sign meaning: North Central Kansas

Technical information
- Licensing authority: FCC
- Facility ID: 35209
- Class: C1
- ERP: 100,000 watts
- HAAT: 161 meters (528 feet)
- Transmitter coordinates: 39°26′19.0″N 97°42′16.0″W

Links
- Public license information: Public file; LMS
- Webcast: Listen Live
- Website: www.ncktoday.com

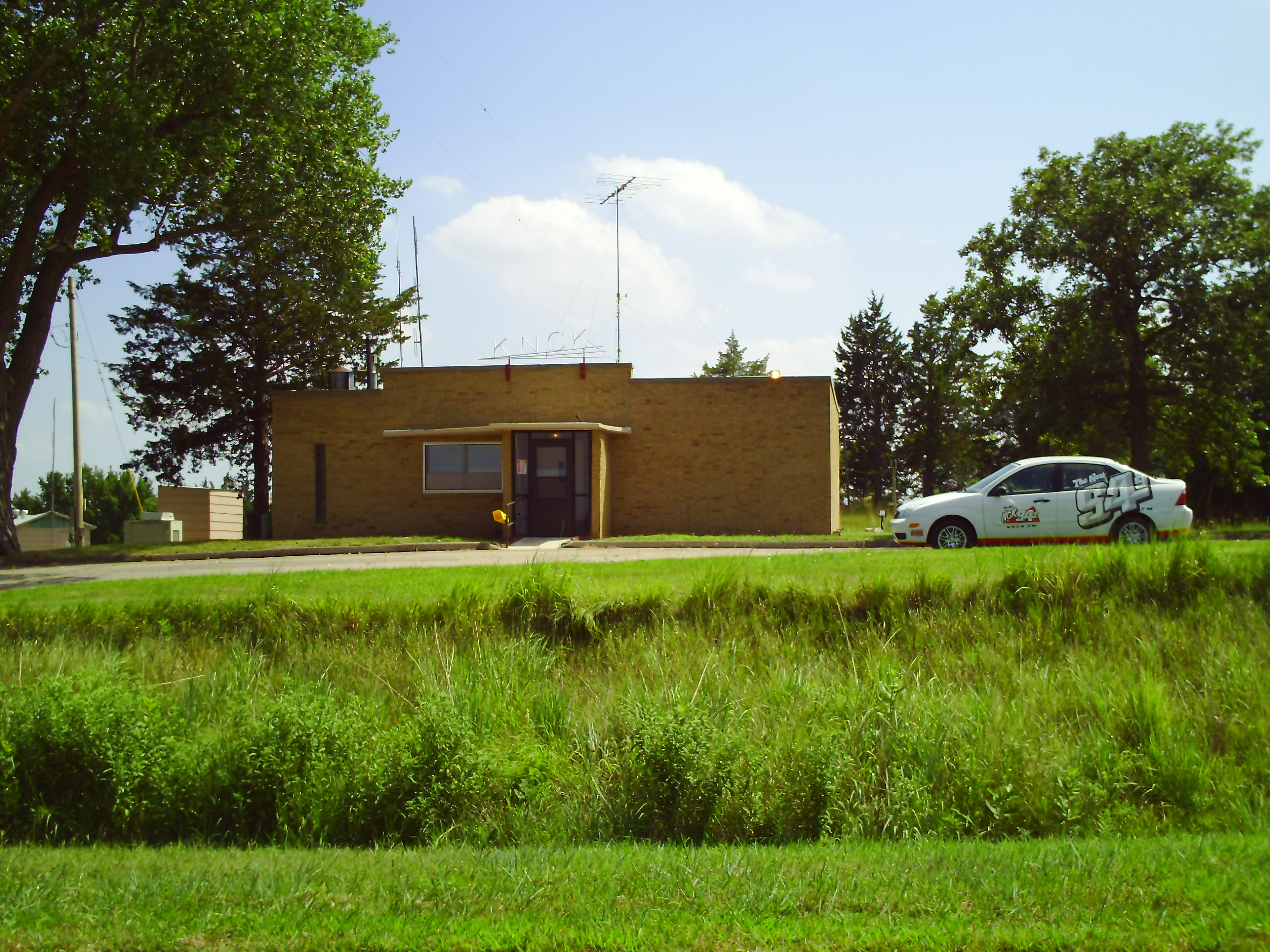
Broadcast headquarters

KNCK-FM (94.9 FM, "The New NCK 94-9") is a hot adult contemporary formatted broadcast radio station licensed to Concordia, Kansas, and serving the communities of Concordia, Belleville, Minneapolis, and Beloit, Kansas, as well as North Central Kansas and South Central Nebraska. The station formerly carried most of its programming from ABC Radio's "Young AC" Network, until the station went to a more local presentation in 2010.

KNCK-FM is owned and operated by Barbara White, through licensee White Communications, LLC. General Broadcasting Co. Inc. transferred the license for this radio station to KNCK Inc. on November 1, 1989. The license was subsequently assigned to White Communications, LLC.

== History ==
=== Original license ===
KNCK-FM was the first licensed FM broadcast station in North Central Kansas. It was originally licensed in 1979 as KCKS-FM to General Broadcasting Company, owned (mostly) by William F. Danenbarger, a former reporter and bureau manager for United Press International (UPI). The station license permitted broadcast at an effective radiated power of 3,000 watts on 95.3 MHz (channel 237A). The original antenna was situated atop the sister station's approximately 200-foot tower in the station's back yard. In 2010, the station changed call signs to KNCK-FM, matching its AM sister station, and meaning "North Central Kansas", its primary service area.

=== Tower loss ===
In 1980, a tornado destroyed the tower used by KNCK-AM and KCKS-FM. The station's General Manager and Chief Engineer, Wendell Wilson, was able to put the AM station back on the air using a low-power transmitter and modified antenna mounted to the side of the studio building but the FM station was off the air until construction of the new tower was complete. The original tower was painted red and white and had aviation warning lights but recent erection of a nearby (and much taller) tower for the local cable system removed this requirement for the KNCK/KCKS tower. For this reason, the new tower remained steel grey.

=== New ownership ===
North Central Kansas native Joe Jindra started working at KNCK while still in high school and spent his life working in radio across the country in Kansas, Missouri, and Arizona. He returned to Concordia in 1989 and purchased the stations from General Broadcasting Company. Under Jindra's ownership, the station increased its power, initially to 6,000 watts, and ultimately to 100,000 watts. Increase of power to 100,000 watts required the station to purchase a new transmitter, change frequency from 95.3 MHz, a "class A" channel (limited to 6,000 watts), to 94.9 MHz, a "class C1" channel, and move to a new tower, 528 feet tall.

Jindra sold KNCK-FM, sister station KNCK, and translator K252EY to Barbara White's White Communications, LLC effective September 7, 2017, at a purchase price of $600,000.

=== Format ===
KCKS began its broadcasting years as an automated EZ-listening station, using a format provided by the Century 21 music service of Dallas, Texas (now part of the Jones Radio Networks. In 1985, the station switched to a modified version of Century 21's Adult Contemporary (AC) format, with a heavy emphasis on prior AC hits. In 1987, the station subscribed to a Chicago-based satellite service, Satellite Music Network, providing a Hot AC format called "Starstation" with live air talent, which it continued to use through 2010 (Satellite Music Network was sold to ABC Radio and later to Citadel Broadcasting/Cumulus Media and the format was renamed Hits & Favorites. For many years, the station joined in simulcast (simultaneous broadcast) with its AM sister station during the morning hours, the noon news (15 minutes) and the evening news (15 minutes). During the school year, it also hosted a daily one-hour program, "the CHS Goodtime Hour", operated out of a small studio at the local high school as part of a class in broadcasting and journalism.

=== Sideband carrier ===
While many radio stations chose to offer subscription-based "Muzak" services on a subcarrier channel, KCKS instead retransmitted the "Audio Reader" program, a radio reading service for the blind offered by the University of Kansas.

== See also ==
- KNCK (AM)
