= KJCK (AM) =

- Junction City, Kansas; United States
- Broadcast area: Salina-Manhattan area
- Frequency: 1420 kHz
- Branding: 107.9 FM/1420 AM KJCK

Programming
- Format: Classic hits
- Affiliations: Westwood One

Ownership
- Owner: Eagle Communications

History
- First air date: May 15, 1949

Technical information
- Licensing authority: FCC
- Facility ID: 52798
- Class: B
- Power: 1,000 watts (day); 500 watts (night)
- Transmitter coordinates: 39°1′33″N 96°48′36″W
- Translator: 107.9 K300DN (Junction City)

Links
- Public license information: Public file; LMS
- Webcast: Listen live
- Website: jcpost.com

KJCK (1420 AM) is a radio station broadcasting a classic hits format and is licensed to Junction City, Kansas, United States. The station is currently owned by Eagle Media, and previously featured programming from ABC Radio and Westwood One. Eagle Media also owns the associated local news site, the Junction City Post.

== History ==
KJCK signed on May 15, 1949, to serve the Salina-Manhattan area.

=== Expanded Band assignment ===
On March 17, 1997, the Federal Communications Commission (FCC) announced that eighty-eight stations had been given permission to move to newly available "Expanded Band" transmitting frequencies, ranging from 1610 to 1700 kHz, with KJCK authorized to move from 1420 to 1680 kHz. However, the station never procured the Construction Permit needed to implement the authorization, so the expanded band station was never built.

=== Later history ===
For many years, beginning in June 1980, this station carried a country music format, and would later flip to a news/talk format. Prior to the mid-1970s, the station simulcasted with its sister FM station.

On October 6, 2011, Platinum Broadcasting announced it was ceasing operations, and that the station, along with its sister stations, would be sold to Hays-based Eagle Communications, pending FCC approval. The sale was approved on December 15, 2011.

After stunting with Christmas music, on December 27, 2018, KJCK flipped to classic hits, and began emphasizing their translator K300DN (107.9 FM).
