= KVSV-FM =

- Beloit, Kansas; United States
- Broadcast area: North-Central Kansas
- Frequency: 105.5 MHz
- Branding: KVSV Radio FM105.5

Programming
- Format: Adult standards

Ownership
- Owner: McGrath Publishing Company
- Sister stations: KVSV

History
- First air date: November 11, 1980
- Call sign meaning: "Voice of the Solomon Valley"

Technical information
- Licensing authority: FCC
- Facility ID: 60774
- Class: C2
- ERP: 50,000 watts
- HAAT: 135 meters (443 ft)
- Transmitter coordinates: 39°28′9.0″N 98°5′37.0″W

Links
- Public license information: Public file; LMS
- Website: www.kvsvradio.com

KVSV-FM is an adult standards formatted broadcast radio station licensed to Beloit, Kansas, serving North-Central Kansas. Prior to January 1, 2016, KVSV-FM had been programmed as an easy listening/beautiful music format station. KVSV-FM is owned and operated by McGrath Publishing Company.
