= KNDY-FM =

Coordinates: 39.960°N 96.735°W

- Marysville, Kansas; United States
- Broadcast area: Marysville, Kansas, extending into Beatrice, Nebraska
- Frequency: 95.5 MHz
- Branding: 95.5 FM KNDY

Programming
- Format: Country music
- Affiliations: ABC News Radio

Ownership
- Owner: Dierking Communications, Inc.

History
- Call sign meaning: K ANDY Grauer, original station manager.

Technical information
- Licensing authority: FCC
- Facility ID: 16915
- Class: C3
- ERP: 25,000 watts
- HAAT: 100 meters (330 ft)

Links
- Public license information: Public file; LMS
- Webcast: Listen Live
- Website: www.kndyradio.com

KNDY-FM (95.5 MHz) is commercial radio station in Marysville, Kansas that plays country music as well as local news, weather, and sports coverage. The station signed on the air July 23, 1974 and moved into a new broadcast studio with sister-station KNDY 1570 AM in July 2006.

== Newscasts ==
Monday-Friday

- KNDY Morning News (7:00-8:00AM)
- KNDY Midday News (12:00-1:00PM)
- KNDY Evening News (5:00-6:00PM)

== Sports Programming ==
KNDY FM 95.5 is an affiliate of the Kansas Jayhawks radio network. The station features play by play of KU football and men's basketball. During the fall and winter seasons the station features live play by play of Marshall and Washington county high school football and boys and girls basketball games. Starting in 2011 Marysville High School football and boys and girls basketball will move to KNDY AM 1570/FM 94.1.
