= KMDG =

Radio station in Hays, Kansas

- Hays, Kansas; United States
- Broadcast area: West Kansas
- Frequency: 105.7 MHz
- Branding: Divine Mercy Radio

Programming
- Format: Catholic radio

Ownership
- Owner: Divine Mercy Radio, Inc.
- Sister stations: KVDM

History
- Former call signs: KRMR (2008–2020)

Technical information
- Licensing authority: FCC
- Facility ID: 164239
- Class: C2
- ERP: 20,500 watts
- HAAT: 151.0 meters (495.4 ft)
- Transmitter coordinates: 38°55′59″N 99°19′51″W
- Translator: 107.3 K297AI (Hill City)

Links
- Public license information: Public file; LMS
- Website: dvmercy.com

KMDG (105.7 FM) is a radio station broadcasting a Catholic radio format. Licensed to Hays, Kansas, United States, the station serves the West Kansas area. The station is currently owned by Divine Mercy Radio, Inc.

The then-KRMR went silent in December 2019 following the termination of Radioactive, LLC's operating agreement with Rocking M Radio. The station was then sold to Divine Mercy Radio, owners of KVDM (88.1 FM) in Hays, for $52,000. The station changed its call sign to KMDG on July 21, 2020.
