= KUSN =

Coordinates: 37°06′28″N 95°43′22″W

- Dearing, Kansas; United States
- Broadcast area: Coffeyville, Kansas; Independence, Kansas
- Frequency: 98.1 MHz
- Branding: US 98

Programming
- Format: Country music

Ownership
- Owner: Sek Media, LLC

Technical information
- Licensing authority: FCC
- Facility ID: 83208
- Class: C3
- ERP: 9,700 watts
- HAAT: 151 meters (495 ft)

Links
- Public license information: Public file; LMS
- Website: kggfradio.linkedupradio.com/kusn-fm/kusn-fm-line-up

KUSN (98.1 FM) is a radio station licensed to Dearing, Kansas. The station broadcasts a country music format and is owned by Sek Media, LLC.

== History of call letters ==
In previous years, the call letters KUSN were assigned to an AM station in San Diego, California. During the period from 1955 until 1979, the KUSN call letters were assigned to an AM station on 1270 kHz in St. Joseph, MO, now licensed as KGNM. KUSN-FM was assigned to St.Joseph, MO from 1960 until 1979, the FM assignment now carries the KKJO-FM call sign. KUSN-FM was later assigned to Pueblo, Colorado from 1986 to 1988 at 107.1 FM.
