= High Plains Public Radio =

American public radio network

- Headquarters: Garden City, KS/Amarillo, TX
- Branding: High Plains Public Radio

Programming
- Format: Public radio; News, Classical music, Jazz
- Affiliations: National Public Radio; American Public Media; Public Radio International; WFMT

Ownership
- Owner: Kanza Society, Inc.

History
- Launch date: June 30, 1980

Links
- Webcast: Listen live
- Website: www.hppr.org

High Plains Public Radio (HPPR) is a network of public radio stations serving the High Plains region of western Kansas, the Texas Panhandle, the Oklahoma Panhandle and eastern Colorado. Operated by the Kanza Society, it is headquartered on North Seventh Street in Garden City, Kansas and operates an additional studio at Arts in the Sunset in Amarillo, Texas.

== History ==
The Kanza Society was founded in 1977. The network's flagship station, KANZ (91.1 FM) in Garden City, signed on in 1980 from a studio at a converted elementary school in nearby Pierceville. Since then, HPPR has added eleven other full-power stations in Kansas, Oklahoma, Colorado and Texas, as well as low-powered translators in Kansas and Texas. Most of these areas had never been previously served by an NPR station.

HPPR's coverage area is one of the largest in the NPR system. It comprises mostly rural areas and small towns; by far the largest urban center is Amarillo.

The network offers two HD Radio subchannels. HD1 is a simulcast of the analog signal's NPR/classical/jazz format. HD2 is "HPPR Connect," which provides an extended schedule of news programming. Both channels are streamed live on the Internet.

== Stations ==
Call sign	Frequency	City of license	State	Class	ERP (W)	Height (m (ft))	FCC info
KCSE	90.7 FM	Lamar	Colorado	A	4,000	113 m (371 ft)	FCC (KCSE)
KZNK	90.1 FM	Brewster	Kansas	C1	90,000	305.4 m (1,002 ft)	FCC (KZNK)
KONQ	91.9 FM	Dodge City	Kansas	A	670	100 m (330 ft)	FCC (KONQ)
KZNZ	91.5 FM	Elkhart	Kansas	A	250	81 m (266 ft)	FCC (KZNZ)
KANZ	91.1 FM	Garden City	Kansas	C1	100,000	292.2 m (959 ft)	FCC (KANZ)
KZAN	91.7 FM	Hays	Kansas	C3	7,500	114 m (374 ft)	FCC (KZAN)
KZNA	90.5 FM	Hill City	Kansas	C1	100,000	201 m (659 ft)	FCC (KZNA)
KGUY	91.3 FM	Guymon	Oklahoma	A	800	89 m (292 ft)	FCC (KGUY)
KJJP	105.7 FM	Amarillo	Texas	C2	43,000	160 m (520 ft)	FCC (KJJP)
KTXP	91.5 FM	Bushland	Texas	A	1,000	80 m (260 ft)	FCC (KTXP)
KTDH	89.3 FM	Dalhart	Texas	A	500	104 m (341 ft)	FCC (KTDH)
KTOT	89.5 FM	Spearman	Texas	C0	100,000	325 m (1,066 ft)	FCC (KTOT)

== Low power translators ==
High Plains Public Radio also has low-powered repeaters throughout western Kansas, as well as the northern panhandle of Texas.

Call sign	Frequency (MHz)	City of license	State	Class	ERP (W)	Height (m (ft))	FCC info	Rebroadcasts
K224FX	92.7	Ashland	Kansas	D	250	85.7 m (281 ft)	FCC (K224FX)	KANZ
K237CN	95.3	Atwood	Kansas	D	250	60 m (200 ft)	FCC (K237CN)	KZNK
K242AK	96.3	Liberal	Kansas	D	250	72.7 m (239 ft)	FCC (K242AK)	KANZ
K242AP	96.3	St. Francis	Kansas	D	92	123 m (404 ft)	FCC (K242AP)	KZNK
K208CL	89.5	Tribune	Kansas	D	250	60.2 m (198 ft)	FCC (K208CL)	KANZ
K235AL	94.9	Amarillo	Texas	D	62	157 m (515 ft)	FCC (K235AL)	KTXP
