= KCCV =

Bott Radio Network station in Kansas City

KCCV and KCCV-FM
KCCV: Overland Park, Kansas; KCCV-FM: Olathe, Kansas; United States
- Broadcast area: Kansas City metropolitan area
- Frequencies: KCCV: 760 kHz; KCCV-FM: 92.3 MHz

Programming
- Format: Christian radio
- Network: Bott Radio Network

Ownership
- Owner: Bott Broadcasting Company

History
- First air date: KCCV: 1990; KCCV-FM: December 1, 1993
- Call sign meaning: Kansas City's Christian Voice

Technical information
- Licensing authority: FCC
- Facility ID: KCCV: 6491; KCCV-FM: 6492
- Class: KCCV: D; KCCV-FM: C3
- Power: KCCV: 6,000 watts (day); 200 watts (night)
- ERP: KCCV-FM: 8,300 watts
- HAAT: KCCV-FM: 172 meters (564 ft)
- Transmitter coordinates: KCCV: 39°02′26″N 94°30′34″W; KCCV-FM: 38°56′10″N 94°50′41″W
- Translator(s): 96.9 K245CC (Olathe); 101.5 K268CF (Kansas City)

Links
- Public license information: KCCV: Public file; LMS; KCCV-FM: Public file; LMS
- Webcast: Listen live
- Website: Official website

KCCV (760 AM) and KCCV-FM (92.3 FM) are two radio stations in the Kansas City metropolitan area featuring a Christian radio format as the flagships of the Bott Radio Network. Both stations are licensed to communities in Kansas, the AM station to Overland Park and the FM to Olathe. They are owned by the Bott Broadcasting Company. KCCV's transmitter is located in Kansas City, while KCCV-FM's transmitter is located in Olathe.

In addition to the main signal, KCCV is also heard on two low-power FM translators: K245CC (96.9 FM), licensed to Olathe, and K268CF (101.5 FM), licensed to Kansas City, Missouri.

While all the Bott radio stations in the Kansas City radio market carry Christian talk and teaching programs, they are not fully simulcast as KCCV-FM has a slightly different schedule than KCCV. National religious leaders heard on KCCV and KCCV-FM include Chuck Swindoll, Jim Daly, Charles Stanley, John MacArthur, Alistair Begg and David Jeremiah.

== History ==
The station that is today KCCV signed on the air in 1947 as KANS. It first broadcast over 1510 kHz and was licensed to Independence, Missouri. KANS was a daytimer, with 1,000 watts and required to go off the air at night. Richard Bott bought KANS in 1962, the first station in the Bott Radio Network. He switched it to a Christian radio format, calling it "Kansas City's Christian Voice." Bott said during a 55th anniversary broadcast in November 2017, that he felt a responsibility and calling to start a Christian radio station.

KCCV-FM signed on the air on December 1, 1993. While it was not yet built, in 1992, the Bott Broadcasting Company bought the construction permit for $537,500. The plan was to have KCCV-FM air Christian programs around the clock, since the AM station was limited to daytime-only broadcasts. The call letters were chosen to represent "Kansas City's Christian Voice."

In 1989, Bott Broadcasting was issued a construction permit to build a new AM station, licensed to Overland Park, at 760 kHz. KCCV went on the air in 1990, with Bott moving its programming from AM 1510 to AM 760. While 760 at first was also a daytime-only station, its lower position the AM dial and 6,000-watt transmitter gave it one of the best signals in the Kansas City radio market. A few years later, the Federal Communications Commission (FCC) granted KCCV permission to stay on the air at night, but with a reduced power of 200 watts.
