= Mass media in Hutchinson, Kansas =

Hutchinson is a center of media in south-central Kansas. The following is a list of media outlets based in the city.

== Print ==
=== Newspapers ===
- Collegian, weekly, Hutchinson Community College student newspaper
- The Hutchinson News, daily

== Radio ==
The following radio stations are licensed to and/or broadcast from Hutchinson:

=== AM ===
- 1450 KWBW Hutchinson (Talk radio)

=== FM ===
- 88.1 KJVL Hutchinson (Christian contemporary/KJIL)
- 88.5 K203EU Hutchinson (Christian radio/KAWZ)
- 90.1 KHCC-FM Hutchinson (Public radio/NPR)
- 93.1 KHMY Pratt (Hot adult contemporary)
- 93.9 K228DW Hutchinson (K-Love)
- 94.7 KSKU Sterling (Contemporary hit radio)
- 95.9 KWHK Hutchinson Oldies
- 98.5 K253BP Hutchinson (Talk radio)
- 99.5 K258AE Hutchinson Christian radio/BBN)
- 100.3 KNZS Arlington (Classic rock)
- 102.1 KZSN Hutchinson (Country music)
- 102.9 KHUT Hutchinson (Country music)
- 106.1 KXKU Lyons (Country music)

== Television ==
Hutchinson is the second principal city of the Wichita-Hutchinson, Kansas television market. The following television stations are licensed to and/or broadcast from the city:

- 8 KPTS Hutchinson (PBS)
- 12 KWCH-DT Hutchinson (CBS)
- 36 KMTW Hutchinson (Dabl)
