= Mass media in Great Bend, Kansas =

Great Bend is a center of media in central Kansas. The following is a list of media outlets based in the city.

== Print ==
Great Bend has one daily newspaper, The Great Bend Tribune.

== Radio ==
The following radio stations are licensed to and/or broadcast from Great Bend:

=== AM ===
Frequency	Callsign	Format	City of License	Notes
1510	KLQR	Oldies	Larned, Kansas	Broadcasts from Great Bend
1590	KVGB	Talk	Great Bend, Kansas	-

=== FM ===
Frequency	Callsign	Format	City of License	Notes
88.1	KRTT	Religious	Great Bend, Kansas	Translator of KREJ, Medicine Lodge, Kansas
89.7	KBDA	Religious	Great Bend, Kansas	AFR
90.9	KHCT	Public	Great Bend, Kansas	NPR; Satellite of KHCC-FM, Hutchinson, Kansas
91.3	K217EN	Christian Contemporary	Great Bend, Kansas	Air 1; Translator of KHRI, Hollister, California
91.9	KRTY	Christian Contemporary	Great Bend, Kansas	K-LOVE
98.9	KGBK	Classic country	Larned, Kansas	Broadcasts from Great Bend
100.7	KHOK	Country	Hoisington, Kansas	Broadcasts from Great Bend
104.3	KVGB-FM	Classic rock	Great Bend, Kansas	-
106.9	KBGL	Top 40	Larned, Kansas	Broadcasts from Great Bend
107.9	KZRS	Oldies	Great Bend, Kansas	-

== Television ==
Great Bend is in the Wichita-Hutchinson, Kansas television market. The following television stations are licensed to and/or broadcast from Great Bend:

Display Channel	Network	Callsign	City of License	Notes
2.1	NBC	KSNC	Great Bend, Kansas	Satellite station of KSNW, Wichita, Kansas
2.2	Telemundo	KSNC	Great Bend, Kansas	Satellite station of KSNW, Wichita, Kansas
30.1	ABC	KGBD-LD	Great Bend, Kansas	Satellite station of KAKE, Wichita, Kansas
30.2	Me-TV	KGBD-LD	Great Bend, Kansas	Satellite station of KAKE, Wichita, Kansas
