= KWHK =

Radio station in Hutchinson, Kansas

- Hutchinson, Kansas; United States
- Frequency: 95.9 MHz
- Branding: 95.9 HK FM

Programming
- Format: Classic hits

Ownership
- Owner: Ad Astra Per Aspera Broadcasting, Inc.
- Sister stations: KSKU, KXKU, KNZS, KMCP, KGBK, KLQR, KLBG (FM), KMPK

History
- First air date: 2007

Technical information
- Licensing authority: FCC
- Facility ID: 164086
- Class: A
- ERP: 2,850 watts
- HAAT: 149 meters (489 ft)
- Transmitter coordinates: 38°02′57″N 98°00′46″W

Links
- Public license information: Public file; LMS
- Webcast: Listen live
- Website: www.adastraradio.com/kwhk/

KWHK is a radio station airing a classic hits format licensed to Hutchinson, Kansas, broadcasting on 95.9 FM. The station is formerly an oldies format station, and is owned by Ad Astra Per Aspera Broadcasting, Inc.
