= Ty Cobb (attorney) =

American attorney (born 1950)

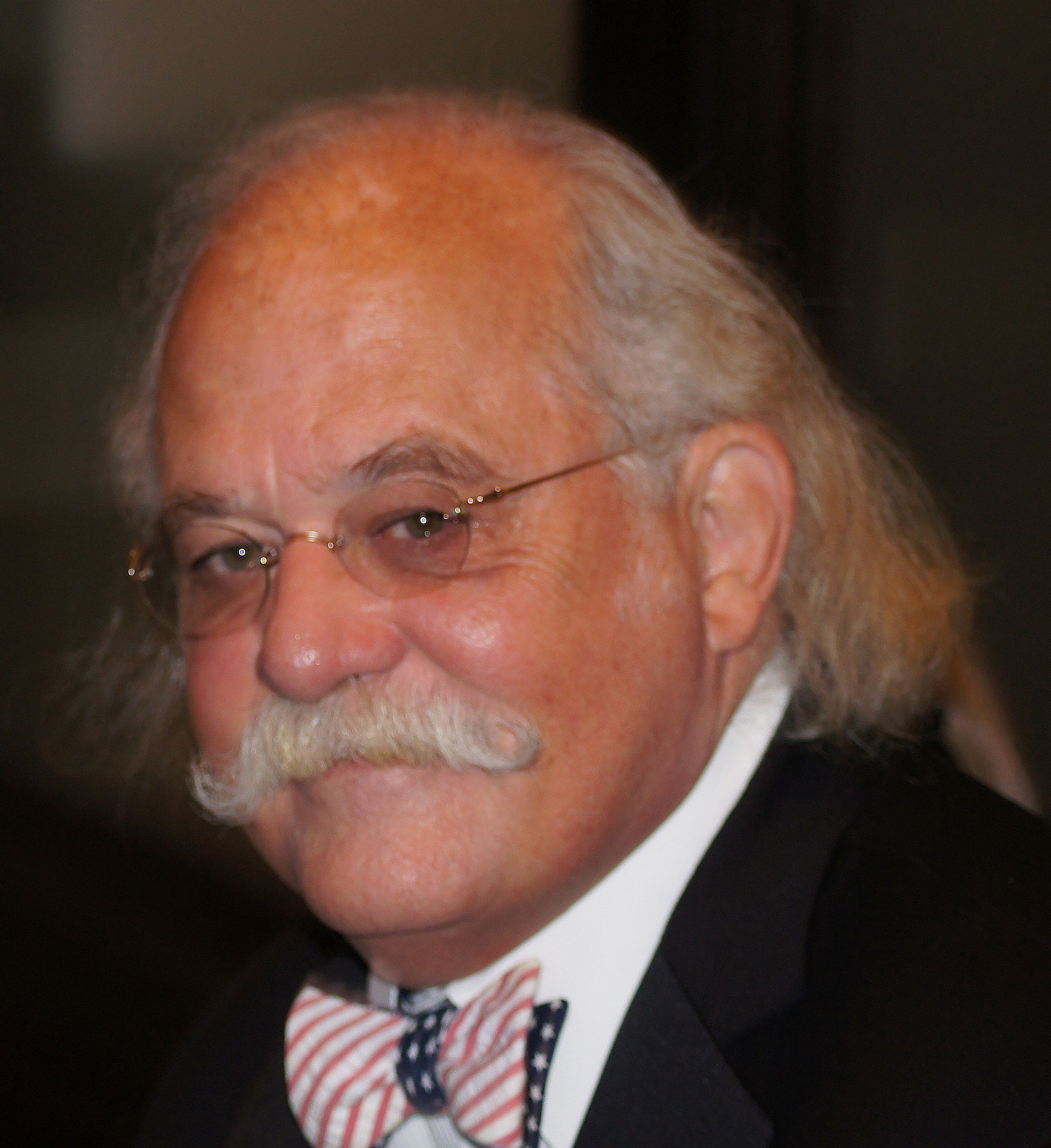
- Cobb at the White House Correspondents Dinner in 2019
- Born: 1950 (age 75–76); Great Bend, Kansas, U.S.
- Education: Harvard University (AB); Georgetown University (JD)
- Political party: Independent

Ty Cobb (born 1950) is an American lawyer. He was an Assistant U.S. Attorney for the District of Maryland in 1981–86. He has been a partner at Hogan Lovells in Washington, D.C. From July 2017 until May 2018, he was a member of the first Trump administration legal team, though he has stated he never voted for Trump.

== Early life and education ==
Cobb was born and grew up in Great Bend, Kansas. He is the son of Grover C. Cobb, a radio station owner who was senior executive vice-president of the National Association of Broadcasters (which named one of their prestigious awards for him). Cobb's father was vice-president and general manager of KVGB (AM)/FM in Great Bend, and had a key role in forming the Kansas Association of Broadcasters.

Cobb reportedly is a distant relative of the Hall of Fame baseball player bearing the same name, but the specific genealogy is not known. FamilySearch's Relative Finder claims that the two Ty Cobb's are 11th cousins once removed with Elizabeth (Nelson) Thomason (1524 – 1609) as their common ancestor.

Cobb received his A.B. from Harvard University and his J.D. from Georgetown Law School. While at Harvard, Cobb became close friends with Senator Al Franken.

== Career ==
Cobb served as a law clerk for a federal judge, then became Assistant U.S. Attorney for the District of Maryland in 1981-86 based in Baltimore as chief of the criminal section and head of the region's drug enforcement and organized crime task force. In 1986, he joined the Baltimore law firm Miles and Stockbridge. Two years later, he joined Hogan & Hartson, which became Hogan Lovells.

Cobb served as special trial counsel during an independent investigation of the Department of Housing and Urban Development in the 1990s.

Cobb successfully defended Hudson Foods against allegations that its executives lied to investigators after a recall of beef tainted with E. coli. The executives were acquitted on all charges. He represented Democratic fundraiser John Huang against campaign finance charges. Huang pleaded guilty in 1999. Other high-profile clients have included Eli Segal, Mary McCarthy, AIG, Office Depot, the House of Saud, IBM, and Medtronic.

Cobb is a Fellow of the American College of Trial Lawyers.

=== Role in the Mueller special counsel investigation ===
For nearly a year, Cobb managed White House matters related to FBI Director Robert Mueller's special counsel investigation into Russian interference in the 2016 United States elections. Having been recommended to President Donald Trump by John Dowd (a member of Trump's private legal team), Cobb joined the White House internal legal team on July 31, 2017 and reported directly to Trump. Cobb said he accepted the assignment because "it was an impossible task with a deadline" and because "I have rocks in my head and steel balls."

Cobb said there was no reason to believe that Trump was personally under investigation and that "They're in full cooperation mode and they've been directed to fully cooperate and get this over with as quickly as possible."

==== Departure from White House ====
On May 2, 2018, Cobb announced that he was retiring as White House special counsel at the end of the month. He issued a statement that "it has been an honor to serve the country in this capacity at the White House. I wish everybody well moving forward."

Cobb stated on October 22, 2018, that he did not think the Mueller investigation was a "witch hunt", as Trump repeatedly called it in the press. He repeated that assessment in an ABC News interview on March 5, 2019, adding that he thought that Mueller was "an American hero".

In December 2020, Cobb told Peter Nicholas of The Atlantic, "I believed then and now I worked for the country. I didn't really have any difficulty with that. People's reactions were frequently hostile when they found out what I was doing. How hypocritical is it to think that the Democrats deserve the best people and Republicans don't? I have served both. It's the same country."

==== Later criticism of Trump ====
Since leaving the White House, however, Cobb has criticized Trump. During the Biden administration, he called Trump "a disaster for the Republican Party" and accused him of "stifling truth". A year into Trump's second presidency, he said that Trump's attacks on the judiciary were "one of the greatest threats to our democracy at this stage of the game". In January 2026, he described Trump's "dementia" and "cognitive decline" as "palpable". In June of 2026, he said "We are witnessing the greatest onslaught of corruption in the history of mankind".

== See also ==
- List of Republicans who oppose the Donald Trump 2024 presidential campaign
- Timeline of investigations into Trump and Russia (2019)
