= Jayhawk Radio Network =

Radio network in Kansas, United States

The Jayhawk Radio Network is a network of radio stations in Kansas that diverts from their regular programming to broadcast men's football and basketball games of the University of Kansas. All stations cover the network broadcast, which begins 30 minutes before the game and ends approximately 30 minutes after, depending on various factors. Some stations also air the Crimson and Blue Line, a pregame show that starts 1 hour before the network broadcast and runs until the network pregame begins.

== Full coverage stations ==
The following stations carry the Crimson and Blue pregame show, the game broadcast, women's basketball, soccer, softball, baseball, and volleyball, as well as the major varsity sports of men's basketball and football.

- KMXN - 92.9 FM THE BULL - Lawrence, KS (flagship station)
- K269GP KLWN - 101.7 FM - Lawrence, KS (flagship station)
- KLWN - 1320 AM - Lawrence, KS (flagship station)
- KJHK - 90.7 FM - Lawrence, KS (flagship station)
- KCTE - 1510 AM - Independence, MO
- K233DM KCTE - 94.5 FM - Raytown, MO

== Football and men's basketball coverage stations ==
The following stations carry Kansas Jayhawks football and men's basketball games, including pregame and postgame shows.

- WHB - 810 AM - Kansas City, MO
- K279BI WHB - 103.7 FM - Kansas City, MO
- KMAJ - 1440 AM - Topeka, KS
- KWIC - 99.3 FM - Topeka, KS
- KGNO - 1370 AM - Dodge City, KS
- KSKU - 94.7 FM - Hutchinson, KS
- KKGQ - 92.3 FM - Newton, KS
- KBGL - 106.9 FM - Larned, KS
- KAYS - 1400 AM - Hays, KS
- K232FJ KAYS - 94.3 FM - Hays, KS
- KIOL - 1370 AM - Iola, KS
- K257GM KIOL - 99.3 FM - Iola, KS
- KQNK - 1530 AM - Norton, KS
- K273DE KQNK - 102.5 FM - Norton, KS
