= KAYS (AM) =

- Hays, Kansas; United States
- Broadcast area: Western Kansas
- Frequency: 1400 kHz
- Branding: KAYS 1400 AM and 94.3 FM

Programming
- Format: Oldies

Ownership
- Owner: Eagle Communications
- Sister stations: KBGL; KVGB; KVGB-FM

History
- First air date: 1948
- Call sign meaning: Hays

Technical information
- Licensing authority: FCC
- Facility ID: 18074
- Class: C
- Power: 1,000 watts
- Transmitter coordinates: 38°53′29″N 99°22′3″W
- Translator: 94.3 K232FJ (Hays)

Links
- Public license information: Public file; LMS
- Webcast: Listen live
- Website: www.hayspost.com

KAYS (1400 AM) is a radio station airing an oldies format of songs from the 1950s to the 1980s, based in Hays, Kansas, United States. It is owned by Eagle Communications Inc.

Eagle Communications owns 28 radio stations in Kansas, Missouri and Nebraska and provides broadband Internet, cable television and telephone services in 29 Kansas communities and Wray, Colorado. Eagle's corporate offices are also in Hays, Kansas.

== History ==
One of the oldest radio stations in western Kansas, KAYS first signed on the air in 1948 by Robert E. "Bob" Schmidt and Ross Beach. Schmidt was appointed General Manager upon graduating college in 1950, purchased the station in 1952, and partnered with Ross Beach to expand the business, which became Eagle Communications. Schmidt and Beach expanded their operation by organizing and launching KAYS-TV (channel 7), which was granted a license and began broadcasting on September 2, 1958. The KAYS radio operation remains housed in the 2300 Hall Street studios in Hays, which was the original shared location expanded to house the KAYS-TV station. For teaching purposes, Fort Hays State University (FHSU) began presenting television programs over KAYS-TV in 1960. FHSU students and instructors had to use the station's equipment after hours, often after the late movies had aired, in order to learn television production.

Sportscaster Bob Davis, widely known as the long-time "Voice of the Jayhawks" for the University of Kansas, spent 16 years at KAYS radio. During this period, he broadcast Hays High, Thomas More Prep-Marian, and Fort Hays State University (FHSU) athletics, laying the groundwork for his hall-of-fame career. Paul Heskett, a long-time Kansas broadcaster inducted into the Hall of Fame, began his career at KAYS before moving to other stations, including KXXX. Additionally, news anchor and former "TV weather girl" Becky Kiser began her four-decade career in journalism at KAYS radio and television in 1981.
