= KVGB =

KVGB may refer to:

- KVGB (AM), a radio station (1590 AM) licensed to Great Bend, Kansas, United States
- KVGB-FM, a radio station (104.3 FM) licensed to Great Bend, Kansas, United States
