= KZSN =

- Hutchinson, Kansas; United States
- Broadcast area: Wichita, Kansas
- Frequency: 102.1 MHz (HD Radio)
- RDS: KZSN
- Branding: 102.1 The Bull

Programming
- Format: Country
- Affiliations: Premiere Networks

Ownership
- Owner: iHeartMedia, Inc.; (iHM Licenses, LLC)
- Sister stations: KRBB, KTHR, KZCH

History
- First air date: 1969 (as KSKU)
- Former call signs: KSKU (1969–1986)
- Call sign meaning: derived from the former "Kissin" brand

Technical information
- Licensing authority: FCC
- Facility ID: 61364
- Class: C0
- ERP: 100,000 watts
- HAAT: 313 meters (1,027 ft)
- Transmitter coordinates: 37°46′40.00″N 97°30′37.00″W

Links
- Public license information: Public file; LMS
- Webcast: Listen Live
- Website: 1021thebull.iheart.com

KZSN (102.1 FM, "102.1 The Bull") is a radio station broadcasting a country music format. Licensed to Hutchinson, Kansas, the station serves the Wichita area. The station is currently owned by iHeartMedia, Inc. Its studios are located on East Douglas Avenue in Downtown Wichita, and the transmitter is located outside Colwich, Kansas.

== History ==
The station began in Hutchinson in 1969 as KSKU and played a Beautiful Music format. It was owned by Margurite Sours and managed by Sam Kahalewai. The station also aired live area high school football and basketball games with Kansas sportscasting legend and Kansas Association of Broadcasters Hall of Fame member Hod Humiston providing the play-by-play. The syndicated "Hawaii Calls" program of Hawaiian music was also aired. In 1973, KSKU became one of a very few radio stations in America that broadcast in Quadrophonic stereo (four-channel sound).

In 1976, the station switched to a Rock 40 format, later onto a Mainstream Top 40 direction. In 1983–84, KSKU upgraded its signal for better coverage over Wichita to compete against then Top 40 stations KEYN (Now Oldies) and KKRD (now Alternative Rock KTHR) in three-way Top-40 battle.

In the late 1970s, the station was sold to Jack Sampson and Sampson Communications. In early 1986, the station's studios were moved to Wichita, and on February 14, 1986, at 3 p.m., the station's call letters were changed to KZSN and flipped to a country music format as "Kissin' 102" to compete with longtime Wichita ratings leader KFDI AM/FM. The final song on "KSKU" was "American Pie" by Don McLean, while the first song on "Kissin' 102" was "Sweet Country Music" by Atlanta. In the mid-2000s, the station rebranded slightly to "Kissin' Country 102.1".

On February 8, 2013, at Noon, KZSN rebranded as "102.1 The Bull". The final two songs on "Kissin' Country" were "How Country Feels" by Randy Houser and "These Days" by Rascal Flatts, while the first three songs on "The Bull" were "Anywhere with You" by Jake Owen, "Even If It Breaks Your Heart" by Eli Young Band and "Pirate Flag" by Kenny Chesney. The station is home to "The Bobby Bones Show" from 5-10am and Michelle Buckles from 3-7pm.
