= KLBG =

KLBG may refer to:

- KLBG (FM), a radio station (95.5 FM) licensed to serve Lindsborg, Kansas, United States
- KLBG-LP, a defunct radio station (92.5 FM) formerly licensed to serve Glide, Oregon, United States
- KJMJ, a radio station (580 AM) licensed to serve Alexandria, Louisiana, United States, which held the call sign KLBG from 1995 to 2000
- Kalaburagi railway station, a railway station in the Kalaburagi district of the Indian state of Karnataka, with the station code KLBG
