= KGLS =

KGLS may refer to:

- KHMY, an FM radio station in Hutchinson and Pratt, Kansas, United States (call sign "KGLS" from 1983 to 1998)
- KGLS-LP, a low-power radio station (99.1 FM) licensed to Tillamook, Oregon, United States
- the ICAO code for Scholes International Airport at Galveston, in Galveston, Texas, United States
