= Jeremy Guthrie =

American baseball player (born 1979)

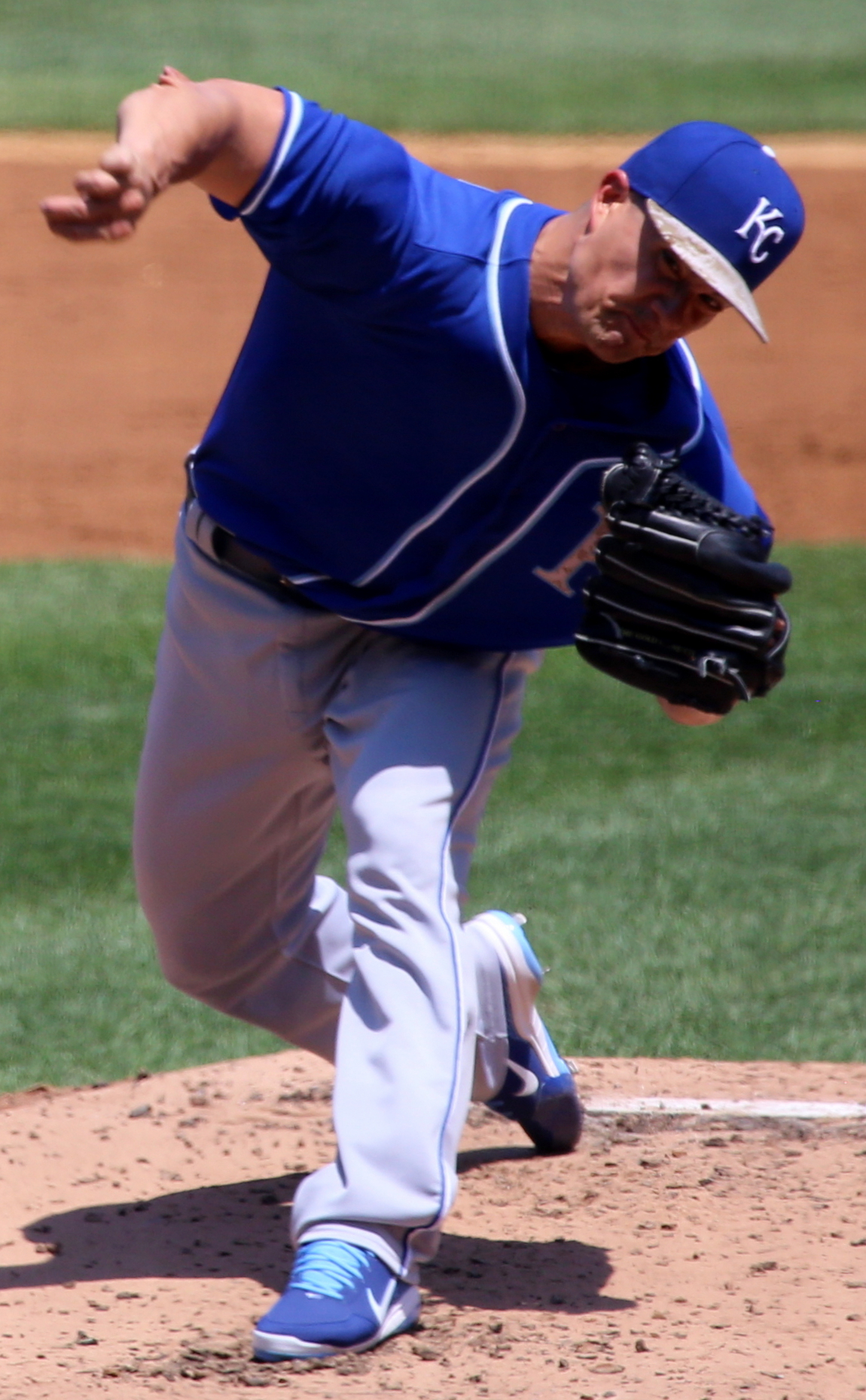
- Guthrie with the Kansas City Royals
- Pitcher
- Born: April 8, 1979 (age 47); Roseburg, Oregon, U.S.
- Batted: Right Threw: Right

MLB debut
- August 28, 2004, for the Cleveland Indians

Last MLB appearance
- April 8, 2017, for the Washington Nationals

MLB statistics
- Win–loss record: 91–109
- Earned run average: 4.42
- Strikeouts: 1,046
- Stats at Baseball Reference

Teams
- Cleveland Indians (2004–2006); Baltimore Orioles (2007–2011); Colorado Rockies (2012); Kansas City Royals (2012–2015); Washington Nationals (2017)

Jeremy Shane Guthrie (born April 8, 1979) is an American former professional baseball pitcher. He played in Major League Baseball (MLB) for the Cleveland Indians, Baltimore Orioles, Colorado Rockies, Kansas City Royals, and Washington Nationals. Prior to playing professionally, he attended Stanford University.

Guthrie was selected by the Indians in the first-round of the 2002 MLB draft. He made his MLB debut in 2004, but continued to stay in the Indians' minor-league system. In 2007, he was claimed off waivers by the Orioles, where he had a 3.70 ERA and went 7–5 across 32 starts. In 2009, he pitched for the United States national team in the 2009 World Baseball Classic.

In 2012, he was traded twice, landing on the Royals in July. He proved to be the best pitcher for the Royals in the second half of the season, posting a 3.16 ERA and a 5–3 record. In 2014, he made his only appearance in the postseason, including two starts in the 2014 World Series against the San Francisco Giants, going 1–1. After becoming a free agent at the end of the 2015 season, he signed multiple minor-league contracts before being released each time. In 2017, he signed with the Nationals and appeared in one game before being released.

He is currently a broadcaster for the Royals and owns a custom shoe company.

== Early life and education ==
Guthrie was born in Roseburg, Oregon and grew up in Ashland, Oregon. As a youth, he attained the rank of Eagle Scout in the Boy Scouts of America. Guthrie attended Ashland High School, where he excelled in basketball, football, baseball, as well as the classroom, where he was class valedictorian. After high school, he attended Brigham Young University before transferring to Stanford University, where he was a starting pitcher on their baseball team. At Stanford, Guthrie studied sociology and continued to pursue his degree in the MLB offseason.

== Baseball career ==
=== College ===
Guthrie played his freshman season at Brigham Young University before leaving to serve an LDS mission.

Guthrie was the ace of the Stanford Cardinal staff and formed a battery with Ryan Garko. He pitched in the regionals that season against MAAC champion Marist College in the first game and won 5–3. Stanford reached the 2001 College World Series final, but lost 12–1 in the championship game to the Miami Hurricanes.

=== Cleveland Indians ===
Guthrie was the first-round selection (22nd overall) of the Cleveland Indians in the 2002 MLB draft. He signed with the Indians on October 3, 2002. His four-year, $4 million contract included a $3 million signing bonus.

Guthrie made his MLB debut in 2004, pitching in six games for the Indians. In 2005, Guthrie spent the majority of the season in the minors. He appeared in one game for the Indians, pitching six innings while allowing four runs.

Guthrie spent most of the 2006 season with the Triple-A Buffalo Bisons, but was twice called up to the MLB to join Cleveland as a relief pitcher. He wore jersey number 57 for both the Bisons and the Indians. After being removed from the 40-man roster following the signing of Trot Nixon and with no remaining minor league options, he was designated for assignment on January 19, 2007.

=== Baltimore Orioles ===
Guthrie was claimed off waivers by the Baltimore Orioles on January 29, 2007. Upon joining the team, he requested and was granted permission to wear uniform number 46 from then-executive vice president of baseball operations Mike Flanagan, who had worn it during his playing career with the tean. After starting the year in the Orioles' bullpen and then moving into the starting rotation, Guthrie enjoyed a breakout year in 2007, becoming one of the best and most consistent pitchers in the American League (AL). Through June 21, he ranked second in ERA and allowed more than two earned runs in just one out of 10 starts. He was also first in the AL in WHIP. Through the end of July, he had a 7–3 record in 17 starts to go with a sparkling 2.89 ERA and a 1.027 WHIP (second only to Johan Santana) albeit only in 124.7 innings of work. Guthrie's rise to unexpected success in the first half of the season led to consideration for the AL Rookie of the Year Award. He finished the year 7–5 with a 3.70 ERA in 32 games (26 starts), not receiving any award votes.

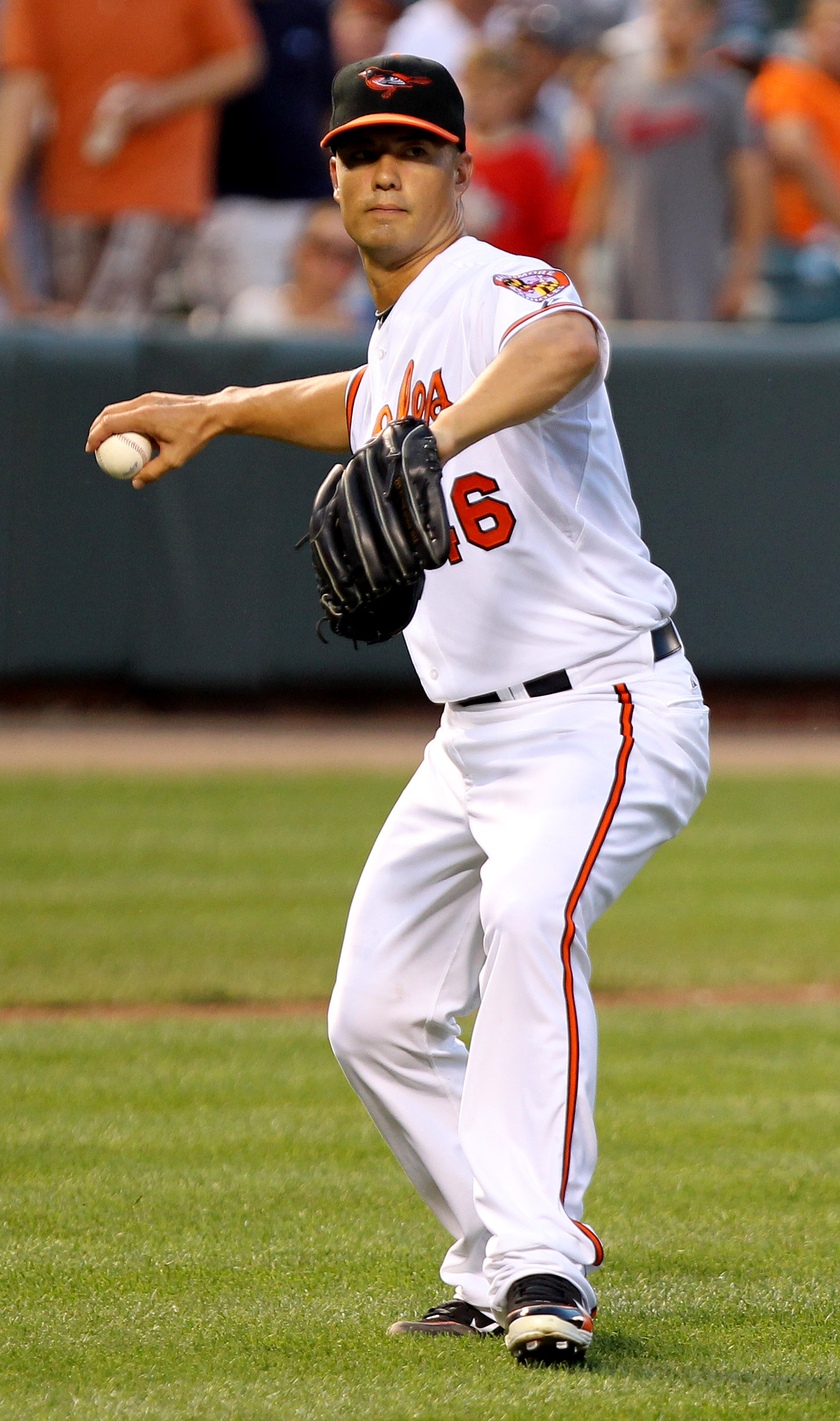
Guthrie during his tenure with the Baltimore Orioles in 2011

In August 2008, Guthrie recorded his first career complete game, defeating the Seattle Mariners 3–1. Throughout the 2008 season, Guthrie emerged as the ace of the Orioles. Guthrie finished the season with a 3.63 ERA, going 10–12 in 30 starts for the Orioles.

Guthrie pitched for Team USA in the 2009 World Baseball Classic. He started on Opening Day for the Orioles against the New York Yankees at Camden Yards. He pitched six innings and gave up three runs in that game. The 2009 season wasn't Guthrie's best, as his ERA ballooned to 5.04 while leading the league in losses with 17.

Guthrie rebounded in 2010, winning a career-high 11 games despite losing 14 and lowering his ERA to 3.83 in 32 starts. In 2011, he pitched in 34 games (32 of which were starts) and pitched for over 200 innings (208) for the third straight season while also leading the AL in losses for the second time in his career with 17.

=== Colorado Rockies ===
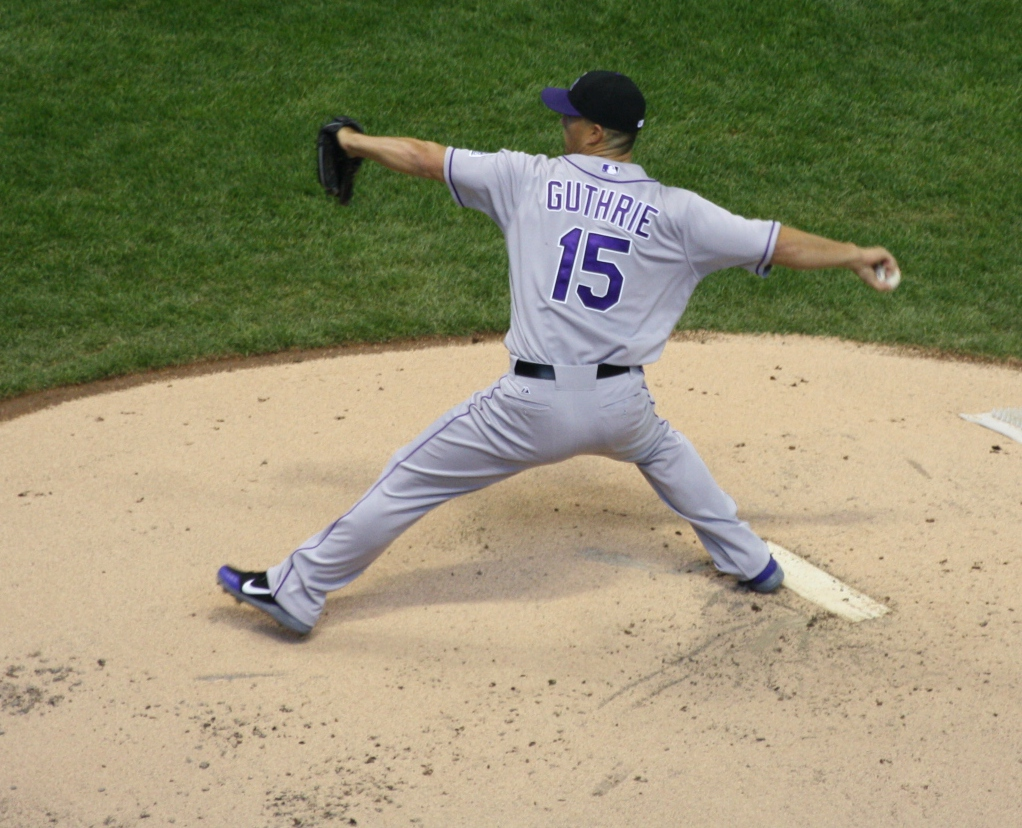
Guthrie pitching for the Colorado Rockies in 2012

On February 6, 2012, Guthrie was traded to the Colorado Rockies for pitchers Matt Lindstrom and Jason Hammel.

He was the Rockies Opening Day starter in his brief stint in Colorado. He was not effective pitching in Coors Field, registering an ERA over 8 at home for the Rockies. In 19 games (15 starts), Guthrie had an ERA of 6.35. His record was 3–9 in half a season with Colorado.

=== Kansas City Royals ===
On July 20, 2012, Guthrie was traded to the Kansas City Royals for left-handed starter Jonathan Sánchez. Guthrie proved to be the Royals' best pitcher in the second half of the season, posting a record of 5–3 with a 3.16 ERA in 14 starts. On November 20, Guthrie signed a three-year, $25 million contract with the Royals through 2015. He earned $5 million in 2013, $11 million in 2014, and $9 million in the contract's final year.

Guthrie logged the most innings of his career during the 2013 season with 211 2/3. He finished with a 15–12 record and a 4.04 ERA in 33 starts. In 2014, Guthrie posted a 4.13 ERA over 202.2 innings and finished the regular season with a record of 13–11. He also appeared in the postseason for the first time in his career. In Game 3 of the AL Championship Series against his former team, the Orioles, he allowed one run over five innings and got a no decision in the Royals victory. He made two starts in the World Series against the San Francisco Giants, going 1–1.

On May 25, 2015, Guthrie had the worst start of his career, and one of the worst starts in MLB history, against the Yankees. He gave up nine hits, 11 earned runs, and three walks. Thirteen of the 16 batters he faced reached base, and he recorded just three outs before being pulled. Guthrie was the first pitcher since Jae Kuk Ryu in 2006 to give up four home runs while pitching fewer than two innings. On August 22, the Royals demoted Guthrie to the bullpen, moving Kris Medlen to the rotation. Guthrie finished 8–8 with an ERA of 5.95 in 30 games (24 starts). He walked 44 batters and struck out just 84 in 148 1/3 innings pitched. He did not appear in the postseason as the Royals won the World Series. He became a free agent following the season.

=== Minor leagues (2016) ===
On February 20, 2016, Guthrie signed a minor league deal with the Texas Rangers. He was released on March 28. On April 1, he signed a minor league contract with the San Diego Padres. He was released on June 3. On June 25, Guthrie signed a minor league contract with the Miami Marlins. After he struggled at Triple-A and the Marlins acquired starting pitching depth, the Marlins released Guthrie on July 30.

=== Washington Nationals ===
On February 3, 2017, Guthrie signed a minor league deal with the Washington Nationals and received an invitation to spring training. Although he began the 2017 season in the minor leagues despite an impressive showing in spring camp, he was called up on April 8, 2017, to start against the Philadelphia Phillies at Citizens Bank Park. Making his first start with the Nationals on his 38th birthday, Guthrie struggled immensely as he was removed from the game after getting only two outs in the first inning. He allowed 10 runs, and the Nationals lost 17–3. As in 2015, he had one of the worst starts in MLB history. After his outing, his ERA for the year was 135.00. The next day, the Nationals designated Guthrie for assignment and called up Matt Albers. He elected free agency on April 12.

=== Acereros de Monclova ===
On May 18, 2017, Guthrie signed with the Acereros de Monclova of the Mexican Baseball League. He was released on June 2, 2017. In 8 games (7.2 innings of relief) he went 0–0 with an 8.22 ERA and 3 strikeouts. He announced his retirement from MLB on July 31, 2017.

=== Eastern Reyes del Tigre ===
In July 2020, Guthrie came out of retirement to pitch for the Eastern Reyes del Tigre of the Constellation Energy League, a makeshift four-team independent league created as a result of the COVID-19 pandemic.

== Personal life ==
Guthrie and his wife have three children. They live in Kansas City, Missouri. Guthrie's mother is Japanese American and grew up in Hawaii. He is a yonsei or fourth generation Japanese American, but does not speak Japanese.

Guthrie was a commentator for a Royals game in 2018. He joined the Royals broadcast team in 2023 and was one of three commentators in 2026.

Guthrie wore customized sneakers converted into cleats during his playing career. In 2023, he became the owner of Custom Cleats, a shoe conversion company he had used as a player. The company has provided cleats to several celebrities and baseball players, including Paul Rudd, Josh Naylor, and Michael Lorenzen, who wore cleated Vans shoes when he pitched a no-hitter in 2023.

Guthrie is a member of the Church of Jesus Christ of Latter-day Saints (LDS Church), and he served for two years as a missionary for the church in Spain. He was able to translate for the Spanish-speaking Yordano Ventura in an interview. On February 1, 2018, Guthrie began a three-year assignment as president of its Texas Houston South Mission in July.
