= KRBB =

Adult contemporary radio station in Wichita, Kansas

Wichita, Kansas; United States
- Broadcast area: Wichita metropolitan area
- Frequency: 97.9 MHz (HD Radio)
- RDS: KRBB
- Branding: B98

Programming
- Format: Adult contemporary
- Affiliations: Premiere Networks

Ownership
- Owner: iHeartMedia, Inc.; (iHM Licenses, LLC)
- Sister stations: KTHR, KZCH, KZSN

History
- First air date: September 19, 1948; 77 years ago (as KFH-FM)
- Former call signs: KFH-FM (1948–1971); KBRA (1971–1982); KLZS (1982–1989)

Technical information
- Licensing authority: FCC
- Facility ID: 39902
- Class: C0
- ERP: 100,000 watts
- HAAT: 313 meters (1,027 ft)
- Transmitter coordinates: 37.778°N 97.511°W

Links
- Public license information: Public file; LMS
- Webcast: FM/HD1: Listen Live
- Website: b98fm.iheart.com

KRBB (97.9 FM, "B98") is a commercial radio station in Wichita, Kansas. It is owned by iHeartMedia, Inc., and it broadcasts an adult contemporary radio format, switching to Christmas music for much of November and December. KRBB carries several nationally syndicated shows, including "Murphy, Sam and Jodi" in morning drive time, "Delilah" in evenings, and "Ellen K" from KOST in Los Angeles on Saturday mornings.

KRBB's studios are located on East Douglas Avenue in Downtown Wichita. KRBB has an effective radiated power (ERP) of 100,000 watts; their transmitter is located outside Colwich, Kansas. KRBB broadcasts using HD Radio technology; its HD2 digital subchannel formerly carried a contemporary hit radio format, known as "Kiss Radio." The HD2 subchannel has since been turned off.

== History ==
=== KFH-FM and KBRA ===
On September 19, 1948, the station signed on the air as KFH-FM, and was located at 100.3 MHz. It is Wichita's oldest FM outlet. Like most FM stations at the time, it largely simulcasted its AM counterpart, KFH (then at 1330 AM, now at 1240 AM). In 1965, KFH-FM relocated to its current frequency. Two years later, KFH-FM broke from the AM simulcast and flipped to progressive rock as "Channel 97." The station was affiliated with ABC's American FM Radio Network.

In October 1971, KFH-FM flipped to beautiful music as KBRA, named after its previous owners, Phil Kassebaum, Tom Bashaw, John Rees, and Bob Adams. It played quarter hour sweeps of mostly soft instrumental cover versions of popular songs. On July 28, 1982, KBRA adjusted its format to soft adult contemporary as "KB-98"; the abbreviated call letters were only phonetically pronounced "bra" once in a promo saying "We're taking off our BRA". On November 6, 1984, KBRA changed its call letters to KLZS, and rebranded as "Class FM 98". On March 23, 1987, KLZS rebranded as "Magic 98", and tweaked its format to include more new age music and smooth jazz. The long association with KFH-AM was discontinued in 1988, as the two stations were sold to separate owners.

=== B98 FM ===
On October 12, 1989, at noon, the station adopted its current format as "B98 FM" (which would later be renamed as simply “B98” in the late 2010s). The call sign switched to KRBB to go along with the new identity. The station's morning show was long hosted by Brett Harris and Tracy Cassidy. Harris was released from the station in July 2012, while Cassidy was let go in May 2014. Lukas Cox replaced Harris in September 2012, while former Miss Kansas Theresa Vail joined the show as a co-host for a time before being replaced by Careth Beard. In April 2019, Cox and Beard were let go, and were replaced by the syndicated "Murphy, Sam and Jodi", who are based at Baton Rouge sister station KRVE.

former logo

== Tornado coverage ==
KRBB, along with other iHeartRadio stations, partner with KSNW, the local NBC Network affiliate, when tornado warnings are issued in the Wichita area. During an emergency, KRBB simulcasts the audio of KSNW's severe weather coverage.
