= List of Kansas City Royals broadcasters =

Broadcasters for the Kansas City Royals Major League Baseball team.

== Radio ==
=== Lead play-by-play ===
- Buddy Blattner (1969–1975; deceased)
- Denny Matthews (1969–present)

=== Secondary play-by-play ===
- Fred White (1973–1998; deceased)
- Ryan Lefebvre (1997–2007, 2012–present)
- Bob Davis (2008–2012)
- Steve Stewart (2008–present)
- Steve Physioc (2012–2022)
- Jake Eisenberg (2023–present)

=== Color analyst ===
- Rex Hudler ("Hud") (2012-present)
- Jeff Montgomery ("Monty") (2017–present)

== Television ==
=== Play-by-play ===
- Buddy Blattner (1969–1975)
- Denny Matthews (1969–1976, 1983–1987)
- Steve Shannon (1977–1979)
- Al Wisk (1980–1982)
- Denny Trease (1980–1992)
- Fred White (1973–1976, 1983–1987)
- Dave Armstrong (1993–1995)
- Steve Busby (1996)
- Bob Davis (1997–2007)
- Ryan Lefebvre (2008–present)
- Steve Physioc (2012–2022)
- Jake Eisenberg (2023–present)

=== Color analyst ===
- Paul Splittorff (1988–2011; deceased)
- John Wathan (1996–1997)
- Frank White (2008–2011)
- Rex Hudler (2012–present)
- Jeff Montgomery (2012–present)

== See also ==
- List of current Major League Baseball announcers
- Fox Sports Kansas City
