= KWBW =

- Hutchinson, Kansas; United States
- Broadcast area: Reno County
- Frequency: 1450 kHz

Programming
- Format: Talk radio
- Affiliations: Fox News Radio; Westwood One Sports; Compass Media Networks; Premiere Networks; Salem Radio Network; Westwood One

Ownership
- Owner: Eagle Communications
- Sister stations: KHMY; KHUT

History
- First air date: May 28, 1935

Technical information
- Licensing authority: FCC
- Facility ID: 18069
- Class: C
- Power: 1,000 watts unlimited
- Transmitter coordinates: 38°4′22″N 97°57′54.2″W
- Translator: 98.5 K253BP (Hutchinson)

Links
- Public license information: Public file; LMS
- Webcast: Listen live
- Website: www.kwbwradio.com

KWBW (1450 kHz) is a commercial AM radio station licensed to Hutchinson, Kansas, and serving Reno County. The station has a talk radio format and is owned by Eagle Communications.

KWBW is powered at 1,000 watts. Programming is simulcast on FM translator K253BP at 98.5 MHz.

== Programming ==
KWBW has local news, talk and farm reports on weekday mornings and an hour of news at noon and at 5 p.m. A tradio program, called the BW Party Line, airs at 10 a.m. The rest of the weekday schedule is made up of nationally syndicated conservative talk show hosts: Glenn Beck, Bill O'Reilly, Dave Ramsey, Ben Shapiro, Dennis Prager, Sebastian Gorka and America In The Morning. World and national news is provided by Fox News Radio. KWBW is also a Kansas City Chiefs and Kansas City Royals affiliate.

Weekends feature shows on home improvement, gardening, cars, pets, technology and religion. Weekend syndicated hosts include Kim Komando, Gordon Deal and Bill Cunningham. Some weekend hours feature Westwood One Sports. KWBW also broadcasts Hutchinson high school football and basketball games.

== History ==
On May 28, 1935, KWBW first signed on the air. It was the first radio station to serve the Hutchinson area and featured programming from the NBC Red Network. During the "Golden Age of Radio", KWBW carried NBC dramas, comedies, news, sports, game shows, soap operas and big band broadcasts.

In the 1950s, as network programming moved to TV, KWBW switched to a middle of the road format of popular music, news, talk and sports. Over time, as more music listening shifted to FM, KWBW reduced music and increased talk until it made the transition to talk radio.

From 1989 to 2009, KWBW aired Kansas Jayhawks football and men's basketball. The station sold the rights to Kansas Jayhawks games to KSKU in 2009, citing KSKU's stronger, further-reaching FM radio signal and KWBW's already-busy schedule airing Hutchinson Salthawks and Hutchinson Blue Dragons games.

In 2013, KWBW launched an FM translator at 98.5 MHz for listeners who prefer listening on the FM band.
