= KZCH =

- Derby, Kansas; United States
- Broadcast area: Wichita, Kansas
- Frequency: 96.3 MHz (HD Radio)
- RDS: KZCH
- Branding: Channel 963

Programming
- Language: English
- Format: Contemporary hit radio
- Affiliations: Premiere Networks; KAKE (weather)

Ownership
- Owner: iHeartMedia, Inc.; (iHM Licenses, LLC)
- Sister stations: KRBB, KZSN, KTHR

History
- First air date: November 10, 1977
- Former call signs: KDRB (1977–1980); KGCS (1980–1983); KYMG (1983); KAKZ-FM (1983–1985); KRZZ-FM (1985–2004); KTHR (2004)
- Former frequencies: 95.9 MHz (1977–1990)
- Call sign meaning: Kansas Channel

Technical information
- Licensing authority: FCC
- Facility ID: 53599
- Class: C2
- ERP: 50,000 watts
- HAAT: 150 meters (492 feet)
- Transmitter coordinates: 37.718°N 97.318°W

Links
- Public license information: Public file; LMS
- Webcast: Listen live (via iHeartRadio)
- Website: channel963.iheart.com

KZCH (96.3 FM), also known as "Channel 963," is a rhythmic-leaning contemporary hit radio station licensed to Derby, Kansas, and serving the Wichita area. The station broadcasts with an ERP of 50 kW from its transmitter just north of downtown, and is owned by iHeartMedia, Inc. Its studios are located on East Douglas Avenue in downtown Wichita.

== History ==
KZCH signed on November 10, 1977, at 95.9 MHz, and initially aired a country format as KDRB, "K-96", which had studios located in Derby, and a transmitter near Haysville. In April 1980, KDRB changed call letters to KGCS, and rebranded as "96 Country". In December 1982, KGCS flipped to a country/adult contemporary hybrid as KYMG-FM, "Magic 96". At first, the station was automated; in October 1983, the station became locally programmed, and changed call letters to KAKZ-FM. A year later, the station flipped to an automated oldies format, but would revert to adult contemporary in October 1985 as KRZZ. The station flipped to its long-running classic rock format on August 29, 1986. To improve their coverage area, in 1987, KRZZ relocated its transmitter to a location near I-235 and South Broadway in south Wichita, which would then be changed to another location near I-135 and 21st Street in north Wichita. The station would also increase its signal strength to 50,000 watts, and relocate to 96.3 MHz, on April 19, 1990.

On June 14, 2004, at midnight, KRZZ dropped its 18-year-old format and began stunting with a loop redirecting KRZZ listeners to 107.3 FM, and to listen for the debut of a new format on 96.3 at 3 p.m. on June 16. At that time, 96.3 adopted KKRD's heritage Top 40/CHR format, and rebranded as "Channel 963". The current KZCH calls were adopted on June 28.

When the station began, the station leaned heavily on rhythmic material. In 2006, the station readjusted towards a more mainstream direction. In 2009, the station would lean rhythmic again. The move was to counter Rhythmic Top 40 rival KDGS, who is the lone Rhythmic CHR station in the market. As of Summer 2022, the station would shift back to a more mainstream presentation.

former logo

KZCH, along with other iHeartRadio stations, partner with KSNW when tornado warnings are issued in the Wichita area and simulcast KSN's severe weather coverage.

== HD Radio ==
In 2006, KZCH signed on HD Radio operations. On their HD 2 channel, the station carried Club Phusion. In 2011, it was replaced with modern rock, filling the void KANR left open when that station flipped to Spanish in 2006. In November 2012, 96.3 HD2 flipped back to dance, branded as "Evolution." As of November 2022, 96.3 HD2 is now "Club Jam Christmas."
