= Kansas Association of Broadcasters =

- Abbreviation: KAB
- Formation: May 20, 1951; 75 years ago
- Purpose: Broadcasting
- Headquarters: Topeka, Kansas
- Coordinates: 39°3′9.0108″N 95°40′32.0046″W
- Region served: Kansas
- Official language: English
- President/Executive Director: Kent Cornish
- Staff: 2
- Website: www.kab.net

The Kansas Association of Broadcasters is a group supporting broadcasters in Kansas, United States, primarily through lobbying and coordination.

== History ==
The Kansas Association of Broadcasters began in 1951 as the Kansas Association of Radio Broadcasters, when a central Kansas broadcaster sat down to read a letter from Grover C. Cobb, who was vice-president/general manager of KVGB (AM)/FM, in Great Bend.

== Board of directors ==
The 2026 Board of Directors are:

Officers

- Roger Brokke, Immediate Past Chair (Kansas Broadcast Company)
- Phil McComb, Chair (Kansas Broadcast Company)
- Roxanne Marati, Chair-Elect (Audacy, KC)
- Brook Arnold, Secretary-Treasurer (Morgan Murphy Media, Joplin, MO)

Directors

- Kyle Bauer (Taylor Communications)
- Mike McKenna (White Communications)
- Chris Shank (Ad Astra Radio)
- Cheryl Collins (KSCB Radio Group)
- Justin Antoniotti (KMBC)
- Matt Althouse (Eagle Media - Hutchinson)
- Justin Fluke (KNZA Radio Group)
- Dan Engle (Eagle Media - Manhattan, Junction City, Salina)
- Tommy Castor (Audacy Wichita)
- Gregg Hibbeler, President/Executive Director
- Tiffany Reddig, Director of Programs and Member Engagement
