= KTHR =

Radio station in Wichita, Kansas

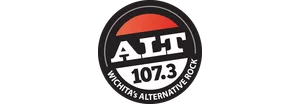
- Wichita, Kansas; United States
- Broadcast area: Wichita, Kansas
- Frequency: 107.3 MHz (HD Radio)
- RDS: KTHR
- Branding: ALT 107.3

Programming
- Format: Analog/HD1: Alternative rock
- Affiliations: Compass Media Networks; Premiere Networks

Ownership
- Owner: iHeartMedia, Inc.; (iHM Licenses, LLC)
- Sister stations: KRBB, KZCH, KZSN

History
- First air date: 1967 (as KARD)
- Former call signs: KARD (1967–1981); KKRD-FM (1981–1982); KKRD (1982–2004); KZCH (2004)
- Call sign meaning: The Road (former branding)

Technical information
- Licensing authority: FCC
- Facility ID: 53600
- Class: C1
- ERP: 100,000 watts
- HAAT: 257 meters (843 ft)
- Transmitter coordinates: 37°46′40″N 97°30′38.2″W

Links
- Public license information: Public file; LMS
- Webcast: Listen Live
- Website: alt1073.iheart.com

KTHR (107.3 FM, "ALT 107.3") is a radio station operating in Wichita, Kansas. The station airs an alternative rock format. Its studios are located on East Douglas Avenue in Downtown Wichita, and the transmitter is located outside Colwich, Kansas.

== History ==
KTHR's format history includes easy listening (or back then known as beautiful music) as KARD, which later evolved into an adult contemporary format. On March 3, 1981, the station's call letters changed to KKRD-FM (which would then be modified to KKRD on April 14, 1982), but maintained its Adult Contemporary format.

By 1983, KKRD changed its format to Top 40/CHR to compete with KEYN (now a classic hits station). Jack Oliver, the station's program director at the time, hired Wichita's number one morning show host, Tim Peters. Following the hiring of Peters, the station overtook KEYN in ratings, making KKRD the #1 station in Wichita, forcing KEYN out of the format in 1989. By around 2000, Rhythmic Top 40 station KDGS, "Power 93.9", dethroned KKRD by becoming the highest-rated Top 40 station in Wichita. In the hopes of attracting listeners, KKRD would tweak its programming and shake up its airstaff; longtime morning show host Don Hall, who had been teamed with Patti Masten since 1996, would move to sister station KZSN in January 2003, and would be replaced by Brad Streeter and Kracker (with Masten remaining as a co-host), followed by Sid, Emily, and Kracker. In addition, KKRD rebranded as "The New 107.3" on May 9, 2003. Despite the changes, the station's ratings would not improve much; in the Winter 2004 ratings period for the Wichita market, KKRD held a 3.1 share of the market, far behind KDGS' 8.7 share.

On June 14, 2004, at midnight, KKRD dropped its Top 40/CHR format after 21 years and began stunting with a loop of reruns of the Bob & Tom Show; at the same time, sister station KRZZ would also begin stunting by directing listeners to 107.3, and would adopt KKRD's old format on June 16 as KZCH, "Channel 96.3". On June 17, at 10 a.m., KRZZ's classic rock format would move to 107.3 and rebrand as "107.3 The Road" with call letters KTHR adopted on June 28. On October 30, 2009, KTHR rebranded as "The Brew." "The Brew" differed from traditional classic rock stations in that it featured a mix of music with a pop lean that appealed to both men and women.

On August 29, 2014, at 9 a.m., after Bob & Tom, KTHR began stunting with Wichita-centric songs and history clips from Wichita and area natives, which began with "Wichita Lineman" by Glen Campbell. One hour later, KTHR flipped to alternative rock, branded as "ALT 107.3". The first song on "ALT" was "Seven Nation Army" by The White Stripes, which mentions Wichita in its lyrics. The flip marks the first alternative station in Wichita for the first time in 8 years, when KANR flipped to Regional Mexican in 2006.
