= Tommy Milone =

American baseball player (born 1987)

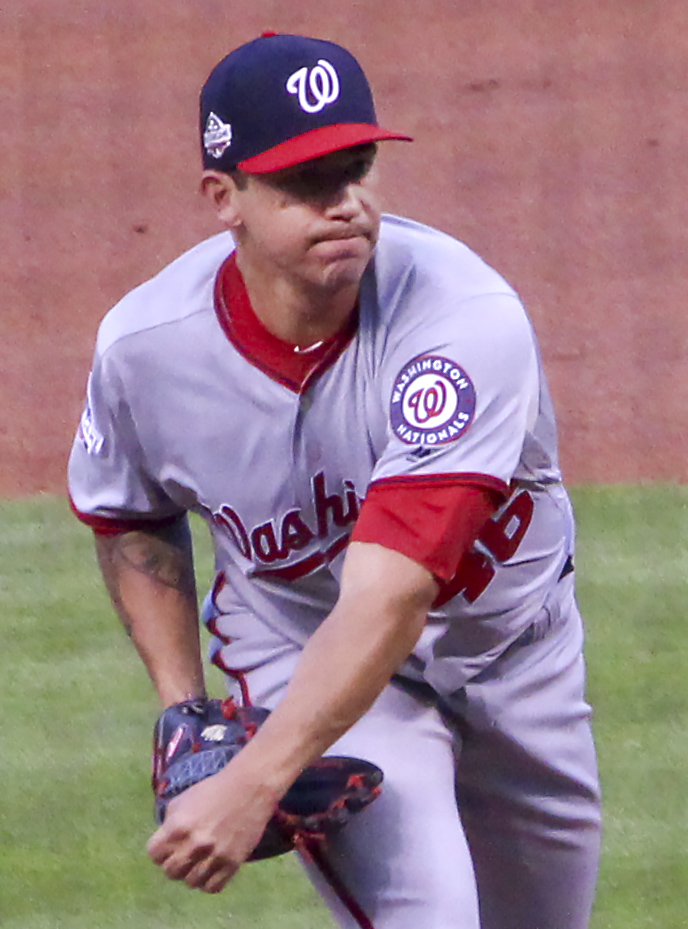
- Milone with the Washington Nationals in 2018
- Pitcher
- Born: February 16, 1987 (age 39); Santa Clarita, California, U.S.
- Batted: Left Threw: Left

MLB debut
- September 3, 2011, for the Washington Nationals

Last MLB appearance
- July 5, 2023, for the Seattle Mariners

MLB statistics
- Win–loss record: 53–53
- Earned run average: 4.58
- Strikeouts: 713
- Stats at Baseball Reference

Teams
- Washington Nationals (2011); Oakland Athletics (2012–2014); Minnesota Twins (2014–2016); Milwaukee Brewers (2017); New York Mets (2017); Washington Nationals (2018); Seattle Mariners (2019); Baltimore Orioles (2020); Atlanta Braves (2020); Toronto Blue Jays (2021); Seattle Mariners (2022–2023)

Tomaso Anthony Milone (/mɪˈloʊn/ mih-LOHN; born February 16, 1987) is an American former professional baseball pitcher. He played in Major League Baseball (MLB) for the Washington Nationals, Oakland Athletics, Minnesota Twins, Milwaukee Brewers, New York Mets, Seattle Mariners, Baltimore Orioles, Atlanta Braves, and Toronto Blue Jays.

== Amateur career ==
Born and raised in the neighborhood of Saugus in Santa Clarita, California, Milone attended Saugus High School, where he was a standout as both a pitcher and hitter. Milone won All-State honors twice, and was the Foothill Player of the Year his senior season, in which he hit .474 and threw a perfect game, finishing the year with a 9–2 record and a 1.04 ERA. Milone then attended the University of Southern California, playing for the USC Trojans baseball team and pursued a degree in public policy and development. As a freshman, Milone was named the number two starter in the rotation and went 7–4 with a 4.94 ERA in 16 starts. In his sophomore season, Milone struggled, going 3–7 with a 6.17 ERA. His junior season would prove to be his best, Milone went 6–6 with a 3.51 ERA and was the number one starter in the rotation. In 2007, Milone played collegiate summer baseball in the Cape Cod Baseball League with the Chatham A's, winning the B.F.C. Whitehouse Award, given to the best pitcher in the league, after finishing the summer 6–1 with a 2.92 ERA.

== Professional career ==
=== Washington Nationals ===
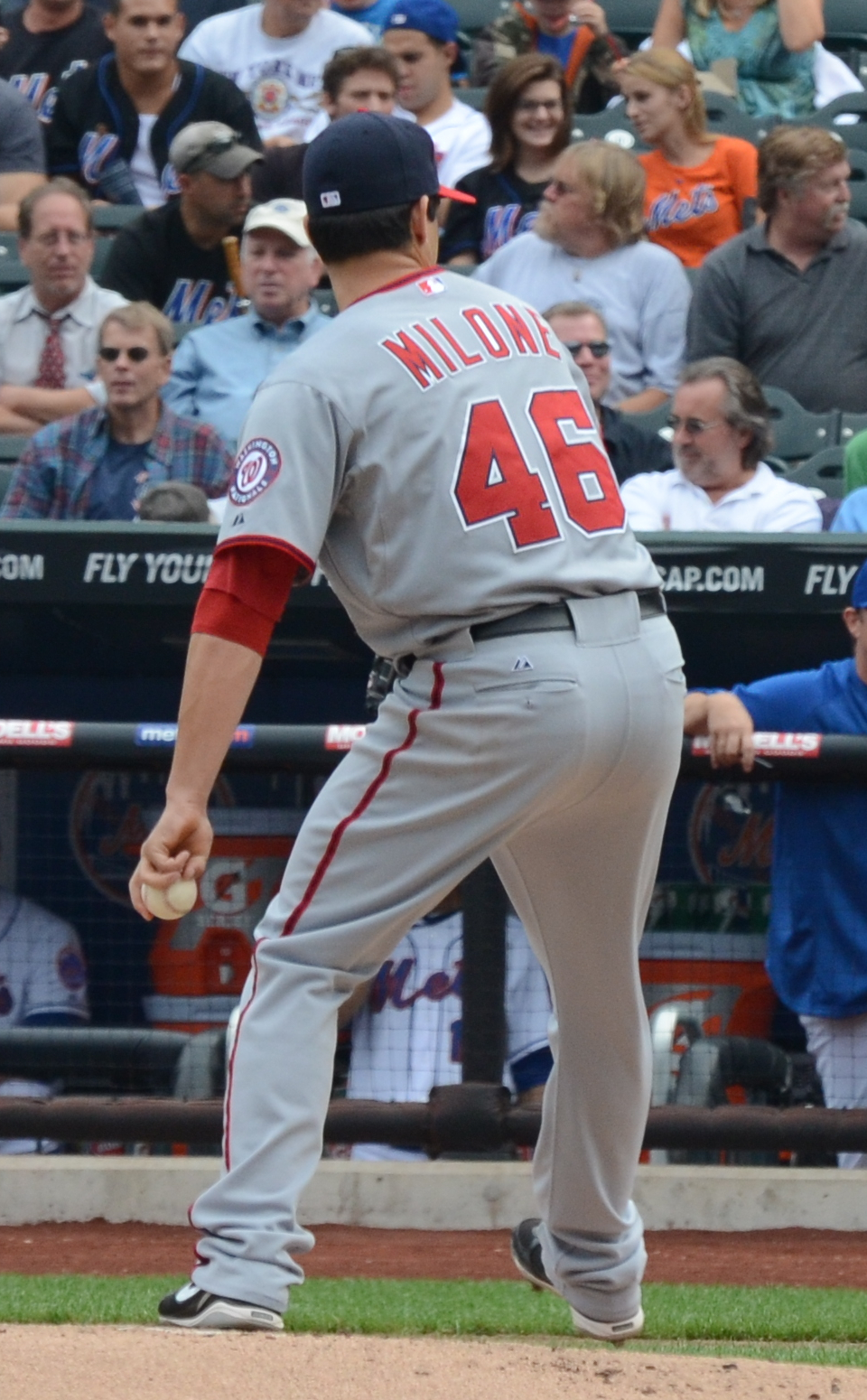
Milone pitching for the Washington Nationals in 2011

Milone was drafted by the Washington Nationals in the 10th round of the 2008 Major League Baseball draft.

Milone made his major league debut on September 3, 2011, against the New York Mets. Milone struck out Angel Pagan of the New York Mets for his first career strikeout. Later in the same game, he hit a three-run home run on the first pitch of his first Major League at bat, becoming the 27th player, and only the eighth pitcher, in major league history to do so. He left the game after pitching four and one-third innings.

=== Oakland Athletics ===
On December 23, 2011, Milone was traded with A. J. Cole, Derek Norris and Brad Peacock to the Oakland Athletics for Gio González and Robert Gilliam.

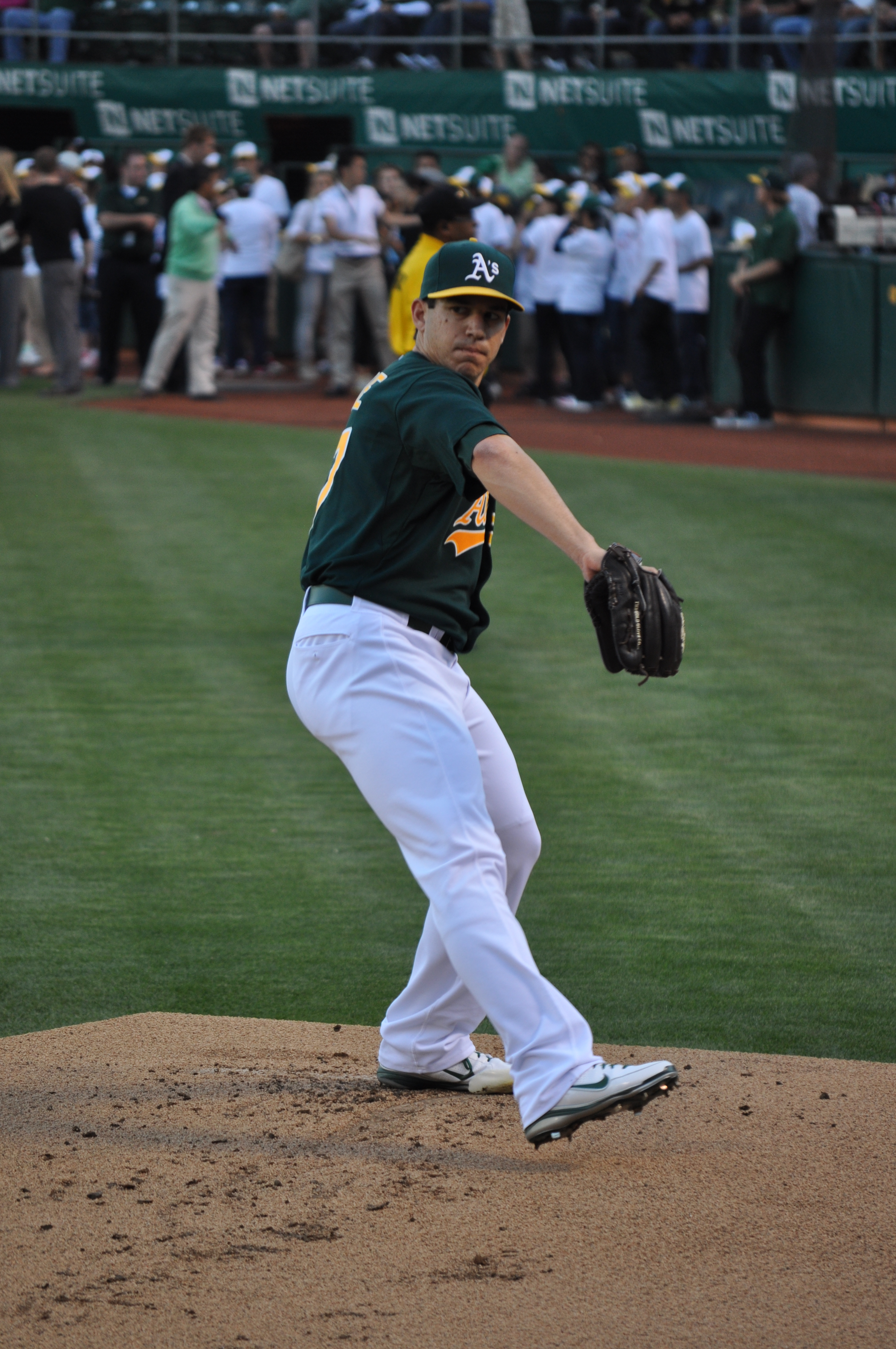
Milone warming up for the Oakland Athletics in 2012

Milone started the regular season in the third starting rotation spot behind Brandon McCarthy and Bartolo Colón. Milone was the only starting pitcher in the A's rotation to last all season without getting injured and had started the most games for the A's during the 2012 season. He pitched his first complete game of his career on June 20 defeating the Los Angeles Dodgers. Milone had started game 2 of the ALDS, but the A's had lost to a no decision in the bottom of the 9th inning. Milone finished the season with a 13–10 record and with 137 strikeouts and an ERA of 3.74.

Milone was optioned to the Triple-A Sacramento River Cats on August 3, 2013. Milone finished the season with 12 wins in 28 games, 26 of them starts.

Milone started the 2014 season in the A's rotation as the fifth starter. Despite owning a record of 6–3 and a 3.55 ERA in 16 starts, Milone was sent down to AAA. After his demotion he demanded a trade.

=== Minnesota Twins ===
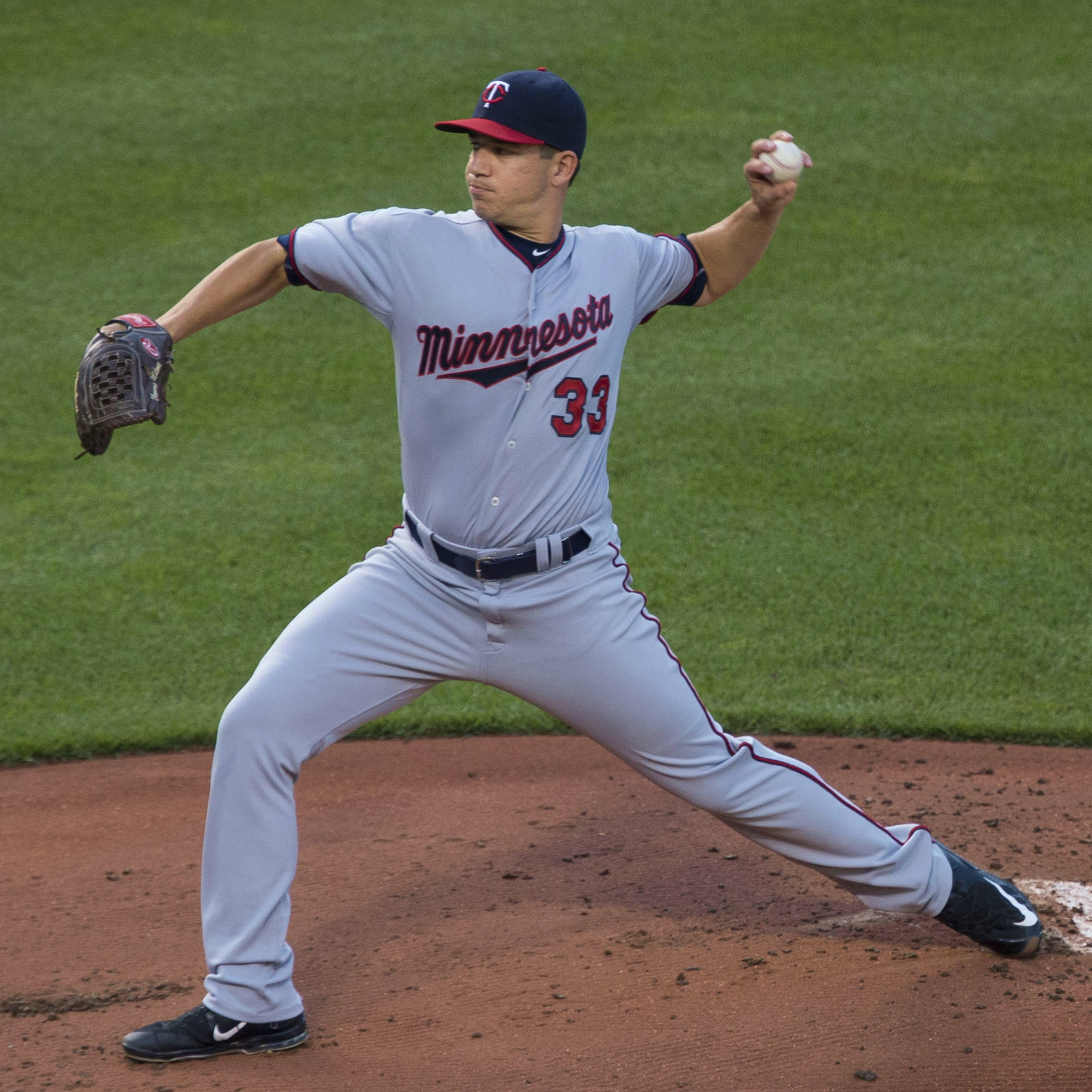
Milone with the Twins in 2015

On July 31, 2014, the Athletics traded Milone to the Minnesota Twins in exchange for outfielder Sam Fuld. Milone started in five games for the Twins before being shut down with a neck injury.

Milone had a bounce back season in 2015 going 9–5 with a 3.92 ERA in 128.2 innings. Milone struggled in 2016 going 3–5 with a 5.12 ERA and after the season he declined being outrighted to Triple-A Rochester by electing free agency.

=== Milwaukee Brewers ===
On December 14, 2016, Milone signed a one-year, $1.25 million contract with the Milwaukee Brewers. He was designated for assignment on May 1, 2017, when the team purchased the contract of Rob Scahill. With the Brewers he was 1–0 with a 6.43 ERA.

=== New York Mets ===
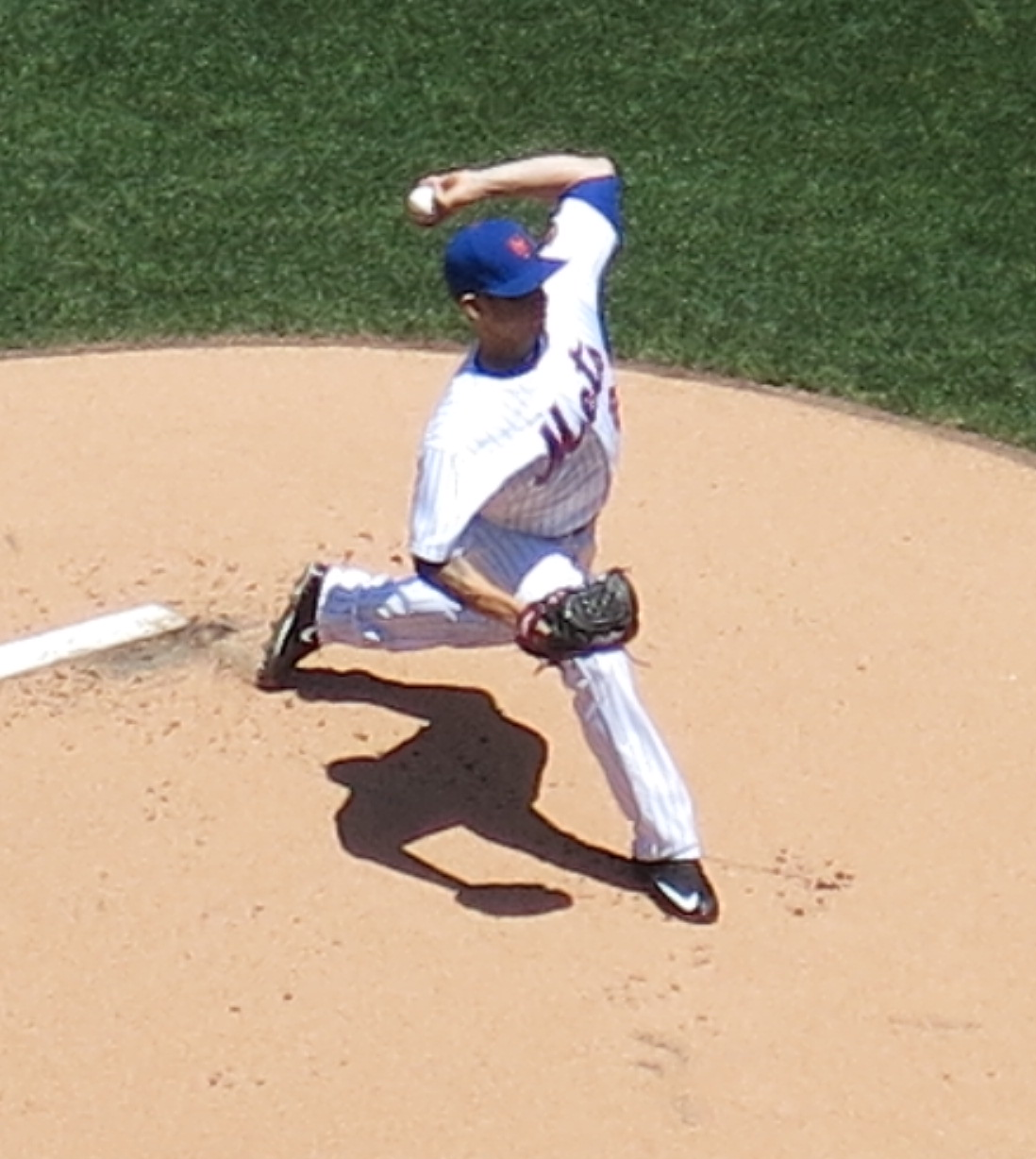
Milone pitching for the Mets in 2017

On May 7, 2017, the New York Mets claimed Milone off waivers. With the Mets, he was 0–3 with a 8.56 ERA. In 2017 between the two teams, right-handed batters had a higher batting average against him, .348, than against all other MLB pitchers in 30 or more innings.

=== Washington Nationals (second stint) ===
On December 20, 2017, the Washington Nationals signed Milone to a minor league contract, with an invite to spring training. On July 26, 2018, he was called up in place of Stephen Strasburg in the rotation. Milone was reassigned to the bullpen on August 18. On September 4, Milone was outrighted off the roster. For the season he was 1–1 with a 5.81 ERA. He declared free agency on October 2, 2018.

=== Seattle Mariners ===
On December 6, 2018, Milone signed a minor league deal with the Seattle Mariners. He opened the 2019 season with the Tacoma Rainiers. On May 21, his contract was selected by the Mariners.

=== Baltimore Orioles ===
Milone signed a minor league deal with the Baltimore Orioles on February 13, 2020.

On July 15, 2020, the Orioles purchased his contract, putting him on the 40-man roster for the shortened season. On July 21, 2020, Milone was named starter for opening day vs the Red Sox as John Means had arm fatigue. On July 24, 2020, he made his Orioles debut as an Opening Day starting pitcher allowing 4 runs on 4 hits and 3 walks in 3 innings pitched against the Boston Red Sox.

=== Atlanta Braves ===
On August 30, 2020, Milone was traded to the Atlanta Braves in exchange for AJ Graffanino and Greg Cullen. The Braves released Milone on September 30, 2020, right before their Wild Card Series game against the Cincinnati Reds. In three starts with the Braves, he went 0–0 with a 14.90 ERA.

=== Toronto Blue Jays ===
On February 25, 2021, the Toronto Blue Jays signed Milone to a minor league deal with an invitation to spring training. On April 4, the Blue Jays selected his contract and placed him on the active roster. On May 27, Milone was placed on the 60-day injured list with left shoulder inflammation. On August 11, Milone was released by the Blue Jays.

=== Cincinnati Reds ===
On August 24, 2021, Milone signed a minor league deal with the Cincinnati Reds. He was assigned to the Triple-A Louisville Bats. Milone made 3 starts for Louisville, going 0–2 with a 14.40 ERA and 10 strikeouts. On October 11, Milone elected free agency.

=== Seattle Mariners (second stint) ===
On April 1, 2022, Milone signed a minor league deal with the Seattle Mariners. He was assigned to the Triple-A Tacoma Rainiers to start the 2022 season. On June 18, he was selected to the major league roster. He was released on August 2. Milone re-signed with the team on a minor league deal on August 19. He elected free agency following the season on November 10.

On December 15, 2022, Milone re-signed with the Mariners on a minor league deal. He began the 2023 season with Triple-A Tacoma.

On April 14, 2023, Milone was selected to the active roster to make a spot start against the Colorado Rockies. He tossed 4 2/3 innings, allowing one run with 3 strikeouts and 2 walks in a no decision. He was designated for assignment the following day. He cleared waivers and was sent outright to Triple-A Tacoma on April 19. On July 5, Milone was selected back to the major league roster to make a start against the San Francisco Giants. He took the loss after pitching 4 1/3 innings and allowing 2 runs (1 earned) on 4 hits and 4 walks. Milone was again designated for assignment the next day following the promotion of Isaiah Campbell. He cleared waivers and was again outrighted to Tacoma on July 13. On October 2, Milone elected free agency.

=== Saraperos de Saltillo ===
On April 26, 2024, Milone signed with the Saraperos de Saltillo of the Mexican League. In 14 games (13 starts) for Saltillo, he compiled a 3–5 record and 5.86 ERA with 40 strikeouts across 63 innings pitched. Milone was released by the Saraperos on July 26.

== Pitching repertoire ==
Milone's four-seam fastball ranges from 85 to 87 mph, and he complements it with a cutter at the same speed, a curveball (75–79), and changeup (79–81), as well as a rare two-seam fastball. Milone's repertoire against left-handed hitters tends to be fastball-cutter-curveball, while against right-handers it is fastball-changeup-cutter. He uses his changeup heavily in 2-strike counts against righties. His curve is his best swing-and-miss pitch with a whiff rate of about 33%. Milone has shown good control early in his career, with a walk rate under 2 per 9 innings.

== Personal life ==
Milone married Tina Sarnecki. They welcomed their first child, daughter Mia, in July 2016.

== See also ==
- List of Major League Baseball players with a home run in their first major league at bat
