= Bob Davis (sportscaster) =

American sportscaster (1945–2025)

- Born: May 27, 1944; Iola, Kansas, U.S.
- Died: March 20, 2025 (aged 80); Lawrence, Kansas, U.S.
- Education: Washburn University
- Sports commentary career
- Team(s): Fort Hays State Tigers (1968–84); Kansas Jayhawks (1984–2016); Kansas City Royals (1997–2013)
- Genre: Play-by-play
- Sport(s): College basketball College football Major League Baseball

Bob Davis (May 27, 1944 – March 20, 2025) was an American sportscaster who was best known for his work broadcasting Kansas City Royals baseball games and Kansas Jayhawks football and basketball games. Davis was known for his dramatic style and calling the Jayhawks' NCAA Tournament Championships in 1988 and 2008.

== Broadcasting career ==
Bob Davis lived in Hays, Kansas, and broadcast Fort Hays State University sports for radio station KAYS (AM) from 1968 to 1984 before becoming the play-by-play voice of the Kansas Jayhawks football and men's basketball teams, a position he held until 2016. In addition to his work on the KU broadcasts, Davis called Kansas City Royals baseball from 1997 to 2013. During his Royals tenure, he worked as the play-by-play analyst on television with Royals Hall of Fame pitcher Paul Splittorff for eleven years. Bob Davis worked for the NCAA-CBS Radio broadcasts of the NCAA Women's Final Four basketball tournament in 1990, 1992, and 1994 through 1997.

== Personal life and death ==
Davis grew up in Topeka, Kansas. Following graduation from Topeka West High School he attended Washburn University. He and his wife Linda lived in Lawrence, Kansas. Linda Davis died of Parkinson's disease on March 13, 2025. Their son, Steven, is a play-by-play announcer for the Double-A affiliate of the Royals and also broadcasts games for the UMKC Kangaroos men's basketball team.

Davis died on March 20, 2025, at the age of 80. His wife of 53 years, Linda, predeceased him by a week.

== Awards and honors ==
- 13-time winner, Kansas Sportscaster of the Year Award.
- Member, Kansas Association of Broadcasters Hall of Fame (inducted 2006).
- Member, Fort Hays State University Hall of Fame.
- Two-time winner of the Oscar Stauffer Award for excellence in high school sports.
- 2001 named to Dick Vitale's "Sweet Sixteen" list of best college basketball broadcasters.
