= KNZS =

- Arlington, Kansas; United States
- Broadcast area: Hutchinson, Kansas
- Frequency: 100.3 MHz
- Branding: KNZS Rocks; Kansas Rocks 100.3

Programming
- Format: Classic rock

Ownership
- Owner: Ad Astra Per Aspera Broadcasting, Inc.
- Sister stations: KSKU, KXKU, KWHK

History
- First air date: September 15, 1989
- Former call signs: KBLV (1988, CP); KAPH (1988–1991); KTCM (1991–2007)
- Call sign meaning: "Kansas"

Technical information
- Licensing authority: FCC
- Facility ID: 1137
- Class: C3
- ERP: 14,500 watts
- HAAT: 135 meters (443 ft)
- Transmitter coordinates: 37°55′40″N 98°17′59″W

Links
- Public license information: Public file; LMS
- Webcast: Listen live
- Website: adastraradio.com/knzs

KNZS (100.3 FM) is a radio station airing a classic rock format licensed to Arlington, Kansas. The station serves the Hutchinson, Kansas area, and is owned by Ad Astra Per Aspera Broadcasting, Inc.

== History ==
The station debuted as KAPH (Kingman, Anthony, Pratt, Harper), a 50,000 watt station licensed to Kingman, Kansas and owned by Ron Bliss, which broadcast a full-service and adult contemporary format. It was affiliated with University of Kansas, Kansas State University, and Kansas City Royals for its sports programming. It also broadcast Kansas Information Network and Kansas Agricultural Network. It initially broadcast from 5 AM to midnight.

In December 1990, for-profit Alpha Corporation (part of New Life Fellowship) purchased KAPH and changed the call letters to KTCM. Religious programming on KTCM was also simulcast on sister station 91.1 KZZD (later KCFN). KTCM later broadcast Spanish programming.

KTCM was sold to Ad Astra Per Aspera Broadcasting Inc. in 2007.
