= List of Baltimore Orioles Opening Day starting pitchers =

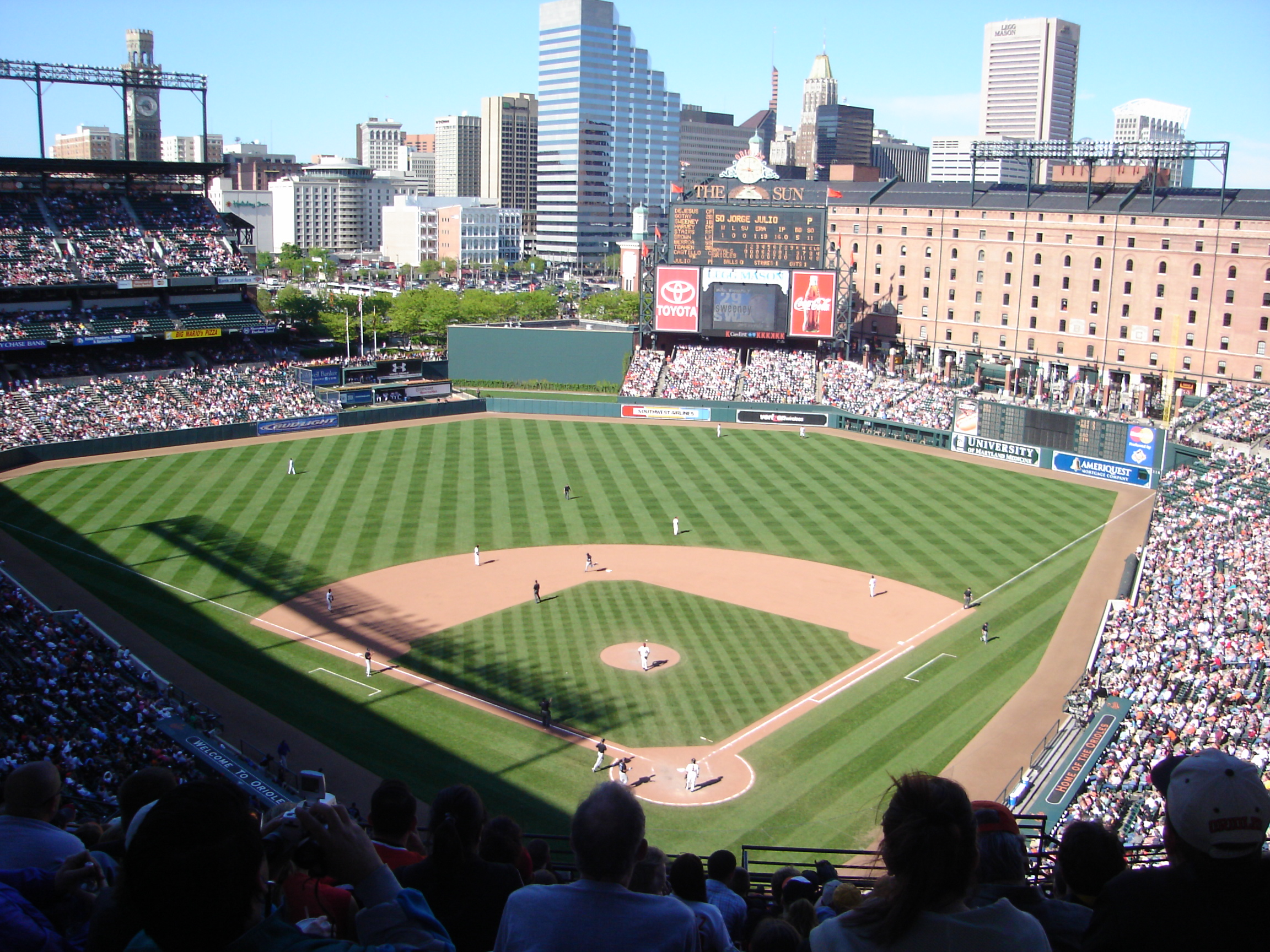
Camden Yards has been the Orioles' home ball park since 1992.

The Baltimore Orioles are a Major League Baseball (MLB) franchise based in Baltimore, Maryland. They play in the American League East division. The Orioles started playing in Baltimore in 1954, after moving from St. Louis, where they were known as the St. Louis Browns. The first game of the new baseball season for a team is played on Opening Day, and being named the Opening Day starter is an honor, which is often given to the player who is expected to lead the pitching staff that season, though there are various strategic reasons why a team's best pitcher might not start on Opening Day. The Orioles have used 33 different Opening Day starting pitchers in their 60 seasons since moving to Baltimore. The 33 starters have a combined Opening Day record of 22 wins, 18 losses and 17 no decisions. No decisions are only awarded to the starting pitcher if the game is won or lost after the starting pitcher has left the game.

The first Opening Day for the Orioles was played in Detroit against the Detroit Tigers on April 13, 1954. Don Larsen was the Orioles' Opening Day starting pitcher that day, in a game the Orioles lost 3–0. Jim Palmer and Mike Mussina have made the most Opening Day starts for the Baltimore Orioles, with six apiece. Palmer has a record of five wins and one loss in his Opening Day starts, and Mussina has a record of three wins, two losses and one no decision. Dave McNally made five Opening Day starts for the Orioles, with a record of three wins and no losses. Other Oriole pitchers who have made multiple Opening Day starts are Steve Barber, Rodrigo López, and Jeremy Guthrie, with three apiece, and Milt Pappas, Dennis Martínez, Mike Flanagan, Mike Boddicker, and Rick Sutcliffe, with two apiece. Flanagan's two Opening Day starts occurred eight years apart, in 1978 and 1986.

Palmer has the most Opening Day wins for the Orioles, with five. McNally's record of three wins and no losses in Opening Day starts gave him a 1.000 winning percentage, the highest in Orioles history. Flanagan's record of no wins and two losses is the lowest winning percentage of any Orioles' Opening Day starting pitcher. Flanagan and Mussina are the only pitchers to have two losses for the Orioles in Opening Day starts.

The Orioles have played in two home ballparks. Memorial Stadium was their home park until 1991, and Camden Yards has been their home park since 1992. Orioles' Opening Day starting pitchers had a record of eight wins, eight losses and eight no decisions in 24 Opening Day starts in Memorial Stadium. They have a record of ten wins, four losses and two no decisions in 15 Opening Day starts at Camden Yards. This makes their aggregate record in Opening Day starts at home 18 wins, 12 losses and 10 no decisions. Their record in Opening Day starts on the road is four wins, six losses and seven no decisions, for an aggregate Opening Day record of 22 wins, 18 losses and 16 no decisions. The Orioles played in the World Series in 1966, 1969, 1970, 1971, 1979 and 1983, winning in 1966, 1970 and 1983. Their Opening Day starting pitchers in those years were Steve Barber (1966), Dave McNally (1969, 1970 and 1971), Jim Palmer (1979) and Dennis Martínez (1983).

== Key ==
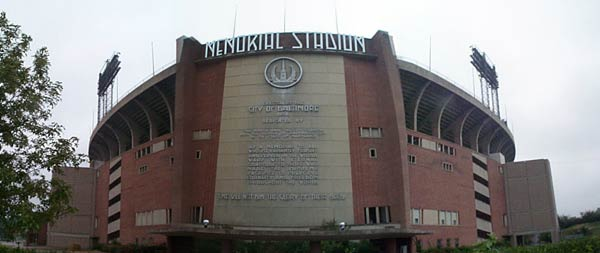
Memorial Stadium was the Orioles' home ball park through 1991.

Season	Each year is linked to an article about that particular Orioles season.
W	Win
L	Loss
ND (W)	No decision by starting pitcher; Orioles won game
ND (L)	No decision by starting pitcher; Orioles lost game
Final; Score	Game score with Orioles runs listed first
Location	Stadium in italics for home game
Pitcher (#)	Number of appearances as Opening Day starter with the Orioles
*	Advanced to the post-season
**	AL Champions
†	World Series Champions

== Pitchers ==
Don Larsen was the first Opening Day starting pitcher for the Orioles in 1954, the year they moved from St. Louis.

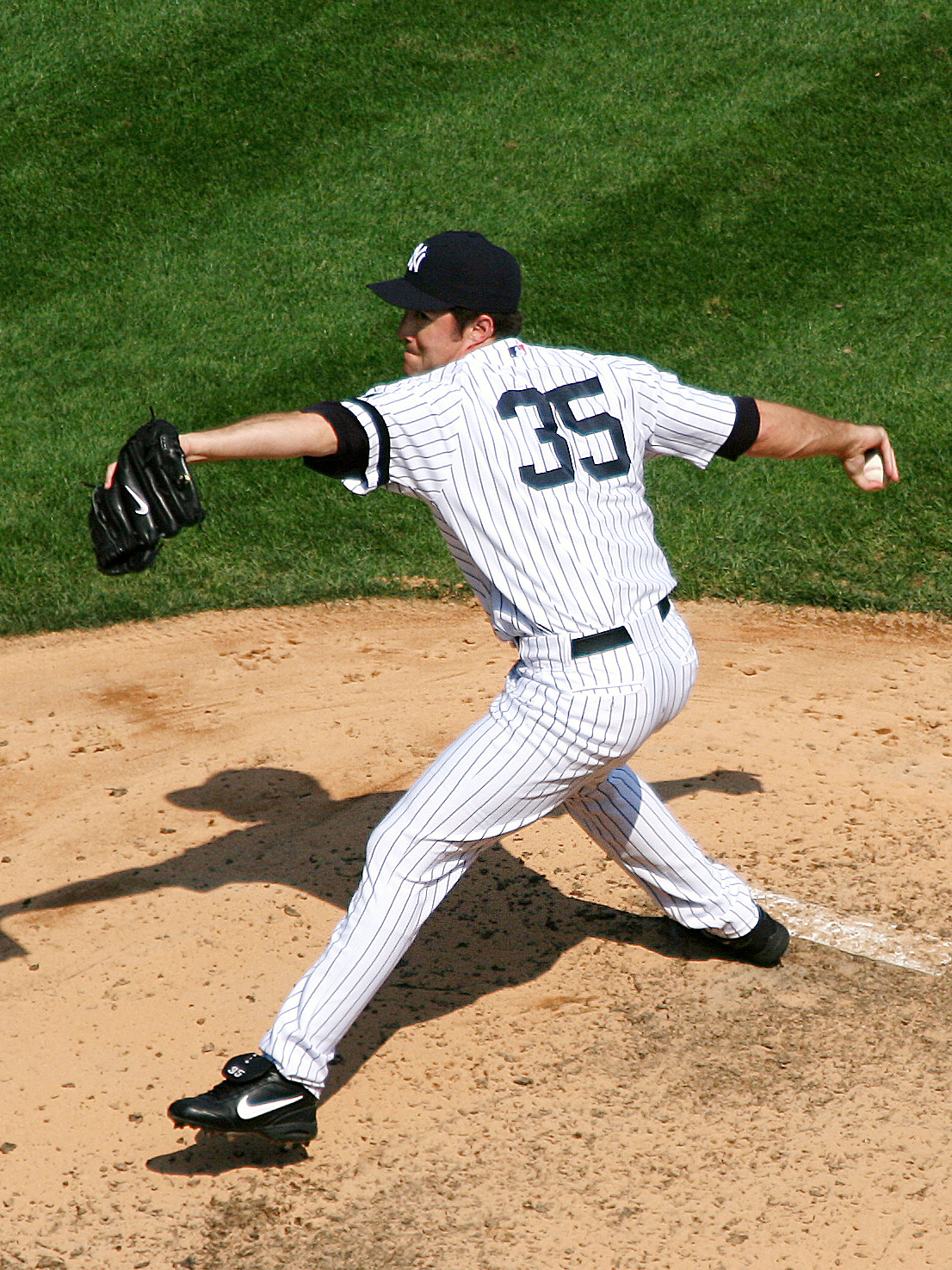
Mike Mussina, shown here with the New York Yankees, made six Opening Day starts for the Orioles.

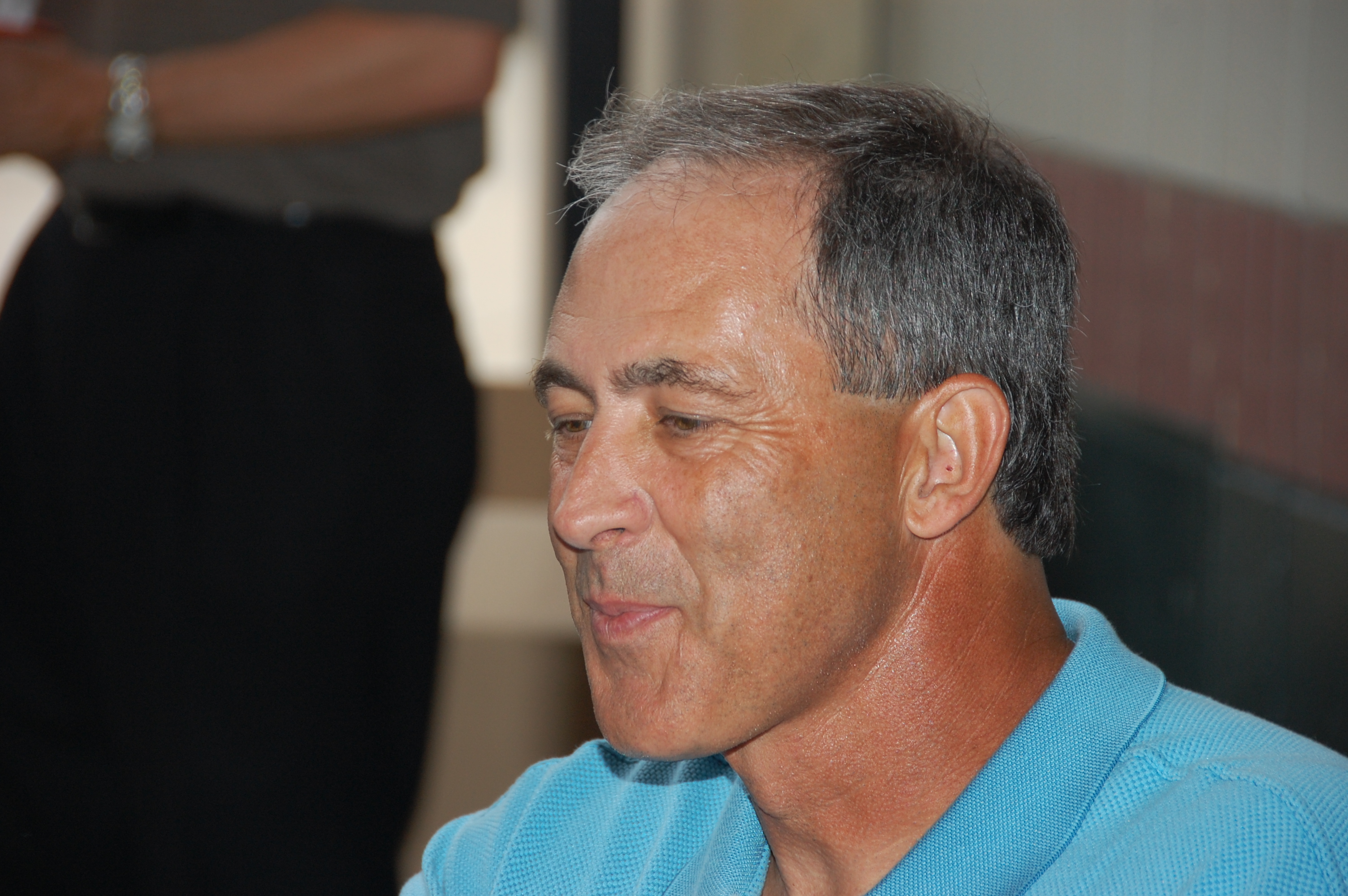
Mike Boddicker made two Opening Day starts for the Orioles.

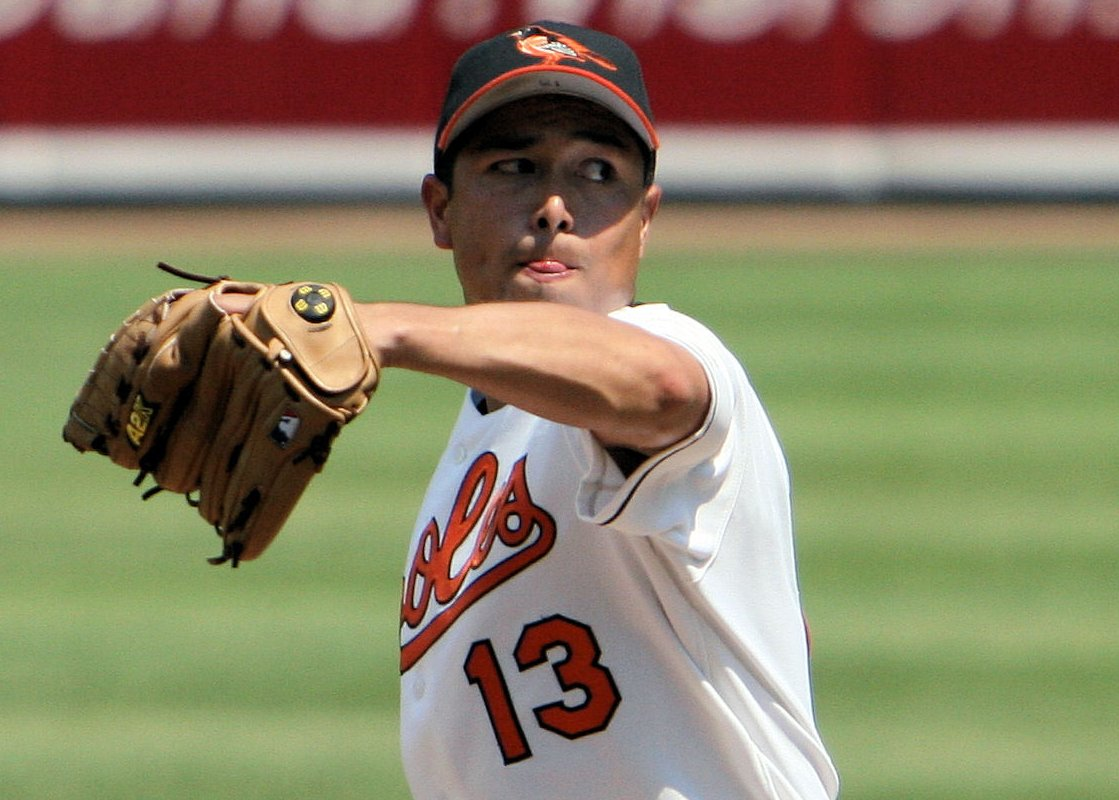
Rodrigo López made three Opening Day starts for the Orioles in 2003, 2005 and 2006.

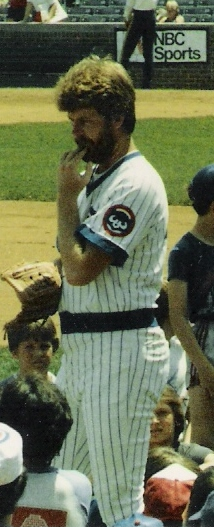
Rick Sutcliffe, shown here with the Chicago Cubs, made two Opening Day starts for the Orioles.

Season	Pitcher	Decision	Final score	Opponent	Location	Ref(s)
1954	Don Larsen	L	0–3	Detroit Tigers	Tiger Stadium	
1955	Lou Kretlow	L	5–12	Washington Senators	Griffith Stadium	
1956	Bill Wight	L	1–8	Boston Red Sox	Fenway Park	
1957	Hal Brown	ND (W)	7–6	Washington Senators	Griffith Stadium	
1958	Connie Johnson	ND (W)	6–1	Washington Senators	Memorial Stadium	
1959	Jack Harshman	L	2–9	Washington Senators	Griffith Stadium	
1960	Jerry Walker	ND (W)	3–2	Washington Senators	Memorial Stadium	
1961	Milt Pappas	L	2–7	Los Angeles Angels	Memorial Stadium	
1962	Billy Hoeft	ND (L)	6–7	New York Yankees	Yankee Stadium	
1963	Steve Barber	W	3–1	Washington Senators	District of Columbia Stadium	
1964	Milt Pappas (2)	ND (W)	5–3	Chicago White Sox	Comiskey Park	
1965	Steve Barber (2)	L	3–5	Chicago White Sox	Memorial Stadium	
1966†	Steve Barber (3)	ND (W)	5–4	Boston Red Sox	Fenway Park	
1967	Dave McNally	ND (W)	6–3	Minnesota Twins	Memorial Stadium	
1968	Tom Phoebus	W	3–1	Oakland Athletics	Memorial Stadium	
1969**	Dave McNally (2)	ND (L)	4–5	Boston Red Sox	Memorial Stadium	
1970†	Dave McNally (3)	W	8–2	Cleveland Indians	Cleveland Stadium	
1971**	Dave McNally (4)	W	3–2	Washington Senators	Memorial Stadium	
1972	Pat Dobson	W	3–1	New York Yankees	Memorial Stadium	
1973*	Dave McNally (5)	W	10–0	Milwaukee Brewers	Memorial Stadium	
1974*	Jim Palmer	W	3–2	Detroit Tigers	Memorial Stadium	
1975	Jim Palmer (2)	W	10–0	Detroit Tigers	Tiger Stadium	
1976	Jim Palmer (3)	W	1–0	Boston Red Sox	Memorial Stadium	
1977	Jim Palmer (4)	L	1–2	Texas Rangers	Memorial Stadium	
1978	Mike Flanagan	L	3–11	Milwaukee Brewers	County Stadium	
1979**	Jim Palmer (5)	W	5–3	Chicago White Sox	Memorial Stadium	
1980	Jim Palmer (6)	W	5–3	Chicago White Sox	Comiskey Park	
1981	Steve Stone	W	5–3	Kansas City Royals	Memorial Stadium	
1982	Dennis Martínez	ND (W)	13–5	Kansas City Royals	Memorial Stadium	
1983†	Dennis Martínez (2)	L	2–7	Kansas City Royals	Memorial Stadium	
1984	Scott McGregor	L	2–5	Chicago White Sox	Memorial Stadium	
1985	Storm Davis	ND (W)	4–2	Texas Rangers	Memorial Stadium	
1986	Mike Flanagan (2)	L	4–6	Cleveland Indians	Memorial Stadium	
1987	Mike Boddicker	ND (W)	2–1	Texas Rangers	Memorial Stadium	
1988	Mike Boddicker (2)	L	0–12	Milwaukee Brewers	Memorial Stadium	
1989	Dave Schmidt	ND (W)	5–4	Boston Red Sox	Memorial Stadium	
1990	Bob Milacki	ND (W)	7–6	Kansas City Royals	Royals Stadium	
1991	Jeff Ballard	L	1–9	Chicago White Sox	Memorial Stadium	
1992	Rick Sutcliffe	W	2–0	Cleveland Indians	Oriole Park at Camden Yards	
1993	Rick Sutcliffe (2)	L	4–7	Texas Rangers	Oriole Park at Camden Yards	
1994	Mike Mussina	W	6–3	Kansas City Royals	Oriole Park at Camden Yards	
1995	Mike Mussina (2)	ND (L)	1–5	Kansas City Royals	Kauffman Stadium	
1996*	Mike Mussina (3)	W	4–2	Kansas City Royals	Oriole Park at Camden Yards	
1997*	Jimmy Key	W	4–2	Kansas City Royals	Oriole Park at Camden Yards	
1998	Mike Mussina (4)	L	1–4	Kansas City Royals	Oriole Park at Camden Yards	
1999	Mike Mussina (5)	W	10–7	Tampa Bay Devil Rays	Oriole Park at Camden Yards	
2000	Mike Mussina (6)	L	1–4	Cleveland Indians	Oriole Park at Camden Yards	
2001	Pat Hentgen	ND (W)	2–1	Boston Red Sox	Oriole Park at Camden Yards	
2002	Scott Erickson	W	10–3	New York Yankees	Oriole Park at Camden Yards	
2003	Rodrigo López	ND (W)	6–5	Cleveland Indians	Oriole Park at Camden Yards	
2004	Sidney Ponson	W	7–2	Boston Red Sox	Oriole Park at Camden Yards	
2005	Rodrigo López (2)	W	4–0	Oakland Athletics	Oriole Park at Camden Yards	
2006	Rodrigo López (3)	W	9–6	Tampa Bay Devil Rays	Oriole Park at Camden Yards	
2007	Érik Bédard	L	4–7	Minnesota Twins	Hubert H. Humphrey Metrodome	
2008	Jeremy Guthrie	L	2–6	Tampa Bay Rays	Oriole Park at Camden Yards	
2009	Jeremy Guthrie (2)	W	10–5	New York Yankees	Oriole Park at Camden Yards	
2010	Kevin Millwood	ND (L)	3–4	Tampa Bay Rays	Tropicana Field	
2011	Jeremy Guthrie (3)	W	3–1	Tampa Bay Rays	Tropicana Field	
2012*	Jake Arrieta	W	3–2	Minnesota Twins	Oriole Park at Camden Yards	
2013	Jason Hammel	W	4–3	Tampa Bay Rays	Tropicana Field	
2014*	Chris Tillman	W	2–1	Boston Red Sox	Oriole Park at Camden Yards	
2015	Chris Tillman (2)	W	6–2	Tampa Bay Rays	Tropicana Field	
2016*	Chris Tillman (3)	W	3–2	Minnesota Twins	Oriole Park at Camden Yards	
2017	Kevin Gausman	ND (W)	3–2	Toronto Blue Jays	Oriole Park at Camden Yards	
2018	Dylan Bundy	ND (W)	3–2	Minnesota Twins	Oriole Park at Camden Yards	
2019	Andrew Cashner	L	2–7	New York Yankees	Yankee Stadium	
2020	Tommy Milone	L	2–13	Boston Red Sox	Fenway Park	
2021	John Means	W	3–0	Boston Red Sox	Fenway Park	
2022	John Means (2)	ND (L)	1–2	Tampa Bay Rays	Tropicana Field	
2023*	Kyle Gibson	W	10–9	Boston Red Sox	Fenway Park	
2024*	Corbin Burnes	W	11–3	Los Angeles Angels	Oriole Park at Camden Yards	
2025	Zach Eflin	W	12–2	Toronto Blue Jays	Rogers Centre	
2026	Trevor Rogers	W	2–1	Minnesota Twins	Oriole Park at Camden Yards	
