= KMPK =

- McPherson, Kansas; United States
- Frequency: 96.7 MHz
- Branding: Mix 96.7

Programming
- Format: Adult contemporary
- Affiliations: Westwood One

Ownership
- Owner: Chris Shank; (Ad Astra per Aspera Broadcasting, Inc.)
- Sister stations: KLBG, KMCP

History
- Former call signs: KNEX-FM (1973–1984); KBBE (1984–2022)
- Call sign meaning: McPherson, Kansas

Technical information
- Licensing authority: FCC
- Facility ID: 15841
- Class: A
- ERP: 6,000 watts
- HAAT: 75 meters
- Transmitter coordinates: 38°20′30″N 97°40′12″W

Links
- Public license information: Public file; LMS
- Website: adastraradio.com/kmpk

KMPK (96.7 FM) is a radio station broadcasting an adult contemporary format. Licensed to McPherson, Kansas, United States, the station is currently owned by Ad Astra per Aspera Broadcasting, Inc.

== History ==
The station was first licensed as KNEX-FM on July 17, 1975. On January 1, 1984, the station changed its call sign to KBBE.

In April 2022, Davies Communications, which had owned KBBE and sister station KNGL since 1985, announced they would sell the station to Hutchinson-based Ad Astra per Aspera Broadcasting. Upon closing of the sale on May 31, KBBE's classic hits format moved to KNGL and its FM translator K255DK (98.9 FM); concurrently, KBBE flipped to adult contemporary as "Mix 96.7". On June 14, KBBE changed call letters to KMPK. Mornings on the station are locally hosted by Tammie Henson, with programming for the remainder of the day coming from Westwood One's "Adult Contemporary" format.
