= KMCP =

Radio station in McPherson, Kansas

- McPherson, Kansas; United States
- Frequency: 1540 kHz

Programming
- Format: Classic hits
- Affiliations: United Stations Radio Networks

Ownership
- Owner: Chris Shank; (Ad Astra Per Aspera Broadcasting)
- Sister stations: KLBG, KMPK

History
- First air date: January 4, 1949 (as KNEX)
- Former call signs: KNEX (1949–1984); KNGL (1984–2022)
- Call sign meaning: McPherson

Technical information
- Licensing authority: FCC
- Facility ID: 15840
- Class: D
- Power: 250 watts day 2 watts night
- Transmitter coordinates: 38°20′30.00″N 97°40′12.00″W
- Translator: 98.9 K255DK (McPherson)

Links
- Public license information: Public file; LMS
- Webcast: Listen Live
- Website: adastraradio.com/kmcp

KMCP (1540 AM) is a radio station licensed to McPherson, Kansas, United States. The station is currently owned by Ad Astra Per Aspera Broadcasting.

== As KNEX ==
The station first went on the air January 4, 1949 as KNEX. KNEX operated out of a two-story farm house south of McPherson, known as the Crumpacker place. The first owners in 1949 were Ken Krebhiel (who also owned The Republican newspaper), Paul Sargent of Peoples Bank and Trust, John Griffith, owner of Friends Drug Store, and Everette Mills, a McPherson attorney.

KNEX's most enduring employee was Claude Hughes, who came to McPherson from Garden City. He began as the station's first engineer in 1949. But he quickly moved up to station manager by 1956. "Cousin' Claude", as his listeners called him, hosted a number of programs, including "Sunny Side of the Street." And he reported McPherson's weather conditions from the "Weather Garden". Claude worked for the station until his death in 2003.

Another notable voice on the station was Bob Hapgood, who Claude Hughes hired in 1968. Bob was the leader of a popular regional band called King Midas and the Muflers. He would draw on his experience as drummer for the band to host an oldies show on KNEX for many years.

Initially, the station had both an AM and FM license, but dropped the FM license within its first year of operation because so few people had FM radios in the 1940s. Later, in January 1974, KNEX-FM was granted a new license and returned to the air in new facilities next to the original farm house.

== As KNGL and KBBE-FM ==
In 1979, new owners took over the stations and chose call letters inspired by their names, Joe Engle (KNGL) and Bernard Brown (KBBE-FM).

In 1985, Jerry and Diane Davies, doing business as Davies Communications, acquired the two stations.

In November 2021, KNGL began simulcasting on FM translator K255DK (98.9 FM), enabling the station's programming to be heard around the clock for the first time (as KNGL was a daytimer, and must power down at night to avoid interference with KXEL in Waterloo, Iowa). By this point, KNGL was airing a news/talk format, along with some sports talk shows and simulcasts of KBBE.

== New ownership, call sign changed to KMCP ==
In April 2022, Davies Communications announced they would sell KNGL and KBBE to Hutchinson-based Ad Astra Per Aspera Broadcasting. Upon closing of the sale on May 31, KBBE's classic hits format moved to KNGL and K255DK; concurrently, KBBE flipped to adult contemporary as "Mix 96.7." On June 14, KNGL changed call letters to KMCP. Mornings are locally hosted by Mark Ekeland, with programming for the remainder of the day coming from Westwood One's "Classic Hits Gold" format. To improve FM coverage in nearby Lindsborg, Ad Astra purchased KJRL translator K243BD (96.5 FM) from Great Plains Christian Radio in 2023, with the intent of relocating its transmitter from Salina to Lindsborg, and move to 96.3 FM.
