= KHUT =

- Hutchinson, Kansas; United States
- Broadcast area: Wichita metropolitan area
- Frequency: 102.9 MHz
- Branding: Country 102.9

Programming
- Format: Country music

Ownership
- Owner: Eagle Communications, Inc.
- Sister stations: KHMY; KWBW

History
- First air date: March 16, 1972
- Former call signs: KWBW-FM (1972–1977)
- Call sign meaning: Hutchinson

Technical information
- Licensing authority: FCC
- Facility ID: 18068
- Class: C1
- ERP: 98,000 watts
- HAAT: 131 meters (430 ft)
- Transmitter coordinates: 38°2′39″N 98°0′56″W

Links
- Public license information: Public file; LMS
- Website: country1029.com

KHUT (102.9 FM, "Country 102.9") is a commercial radio station licensed to Hutchinson, Kansas, United States, and serves the Wichita metropolitan area. Owned by Eagle Communications, Inc., it broadcasts a country music format.

KHUT has been broadcasting since 1972, with a transmitter sited on Whiteside Road at West Clark Road in Hutchinson.

== History ==
KHUT's predecessor, KWBW-FM was the first commercial FM station in central Kansas. A sister station to KWBW, KWBW-FM began broadcasting June 15, 1947 at 95.7 MHz. The stations were owned by William Wyse.

A new KWBW-FM at 102.9 MHz went on the air in 1972, and played country music until 1978. After a short-lived switch to a beautiful music format, the station changed call letters to KHUT and returned to country music in 1979. Owned originally by Nation's Center Broadcasting, the founding company of KWBW, KHUT was purchased by Beach-Schmidt Communications in 1989. Beach-Schmidt is now employee owned Eagle Communications headquartered in Hays, Kansas.
