= KHOK =

Radio station in Hoisington–Great Bend, Kansas

- Hoisington, Kansas; United States
- Broadcast area: Great Bend
- Frequency: 100.7 MHz
- Branding: 100.7 Eagle Country

Programming
- Format: Country music

Ownership
- Owner: Eagle Communications, Inc.
- Sister stations: KBGL, KVGB, KVGB-FM

History
- First air date: 1978
- Call sign meaning: Heart Of Kansas

Technical information
- Licensing authority: FCC
- Facility ID: 18087
- Class: C1
- ERP: 100,000 watts
- HAAT: 131 meters (430 ft)
- Transmitter coordinates: 38°32′49″N 98°46′02″W

Links
- Public license information: Public file; LMS
- Webcast: Listen live
- Website: www.khokfm.com

KHOK is a radio station airing a country music format licensed to Hoisington, Kansas, broadcasting on 100.7 FM. The station serves the Great Bend, Kansas area, is owned by Eagle Communications, Inc.

Eagle Communications owns other radio stations across Kansas and other states.

The station first went on the air in October 1978 and was originally located on Main Street in Hoisington, owned by Paul Kelly. The station initially featured a Pop-Contemporary format until it was purchased by Eagle Communications in October 1988, and its studios were moved to Great Bend. On August 9, 1994, the station changed its format to country music, a transition heavily influenced and crafted by longtime staff member Scott Donovan, who has been credited as the "father of KHOK" and who served as the morning show host for 33 years. The station has won awards from the Kansas Association of Broadcasters (KAB), including multiple second-place finishes in categories like DJ Personality Aircheck and Morning Show in the 2022 Excellence in Broadcasting Awards.
