= KLQR =

- Larned, Kansas; United States
- Broadcast area: Great Bend area
- Frequency: 1510 kHz
- Branding: 1510 KLQR

Programming
- Format: Classic hits
- Affiliations: SRN News

Ownership
- Owner: Christofer Shank; (Ad Astra per Aspera Broadcasting, Inc.)
- Sister stations: KGBK

History
- First air date: November 4, 1963 (as KANS)
- Former call signs: KANS (1963–1997); KNNS (1997–2023)

Technical information
- Licensing authority: FCC
- Facility ID: 7991
- Class: D
- Power: 1,000 watts day 500 watts critical hours
- Transmitter coordinates: 38°9′54″N 99°6′5″W
- Translator: 92.3 K222DP (Larned)

Links
- Public license information: Public file; LMS
- Webcast: Listen Live
- Website: www.adastraradio.com/klqr

KLQR (1510 AM) is a classic hits radio station in Larned, Kansas, near Great Bend.

== History ==
The Regional Mexican format began in October 2010. Before this, it was an affiliate of ESPN Radio from the spring of 2008 to 2010; before ESPN, it was an oldies station with the slogan "Music you remember". Before being an oldies station, it was a general talk radio outlet.

In order to protect clear channel stations WLAC in Nashville, Tennessee and KGA in Spokane, Washington, also at 1510 AM, KLQR must sign off at local sunset every day.

Logo when simulcasting with KRMR

As part of then-owner Rocking M Media's bankruptcy reorganization, in which 12 stations in Kansas would be auctioned off to new owners, it was announced on October 31, 2022 that Hutchinson-based Ad Astra Per Aspera Broadcasting was the winning bidder for the then-KNNS, KSOB and Salina-based KVOB for $40,000. While the bankruptcy court has approved the purchase, the sale must be filed to the FCC for approval. Ahead of the closure of the sale, Ad Astra per Aspera applied for a new KLQR call sign for the station, which took effect on March 1, 2023.

On January 2, 2023, KNNS and KZRS flipped to oldies, branded as "Super Hits 107.9 FM and 1510 AM". Upon Ad Astra per Aspera assuming control of the stations on March 31, 2023, KLQR rebranded as simply "1510 KLQR", and shifted to classic hits.
