= KSKU =

Radio station in Sterling–Hutchinson, Kansas

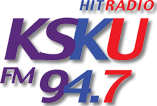
- Sterling, Kansas; United States
- Broadcast area: Hutchinson, Kansas
- Frequency: 94.7 MHz
- Branding: Hit Radio 94.7

Programming
- Language: English
- Format: Contemporary hit radio
- Affiliations: Westwood One; Kansas Jayhawks

Ownership
- Owner: Cliff Shank; (Ad Astra Per Aspera Broadcasting, Inc.)
- Sister stations: KXKU, KNZS, KWHK

History
- First air date: 1985
- Former frequencies: 102.1 MHz (1969-02/15/86), 106.1 MHz (1986–1998), 97.1 MHz (1998–2007)
- Call sign meaning: Kansas KU (abbreviation for The University of Kansas)

Technical information
- Licensing authority: FCC
- Facility ID: 431
- Class: C2
- ERP: 50,000 watts
- HAAT: 148.0 meters (485.5 ft)
- Transmitter coordinates: 38°13′50.00″N 98°18′53.00″W

Links
- Public license information: Public file; LMS
- Webcast: Listen Live
- Website: adastraradio.com

KSKU (94.7 FM, "Hit Radio 94.7") is a radio station broadcasting a contemporary hit radio format. Licensed to Sterling, Kansas, the station serves the Hutchinson, Kansas area. The station is currently owned by Ad Astra Per Aspera Broadcasting, Inc.

The KSKU call letters have been moved to 5 different frequencies across the FM band in central Kansas since 1985. It has been previously broadcast on these frequencies: 102.1, 106.1 (sister station KXKU now broadcasts on 106.1), and 97.1.

As well as music, the station broadcasts several High school football and basketball games from area schools. KSKU is a member of the Jayhawk Radio Network and has regularly broadcast Kansas Jayhawks football and men's basketball since 2009.

== History ==
=== Fire ===
On September 2, 2011, around 2:20 AM, a fire destroyed the studios of Ad Astra Per Aspera Broadcasting, which included KSKU, as well as KWHK, KNZS, and KXKU. As a result, all four stations were off the air for nearly a month until temporary studios were set up in a nearby building. KSKU 94.7 and KNZS 100.3 returned to the air at 7:00 PM on Wednesday, September 28, 2011. Rather than rebuilding after the fire, Ad Astra per Aspera Broadcasting permanently relocated to a pre-existing building. The fire destroyed KSKU's servers, wiping over 25 years of archived shows.

=== Radio hosts ===
KSKU has been the starting place for a number of show hosts, launching several DJs to long careers, including Hank the Mechanic (he started off as Michael Paul at KSKU) and Tom Simon, who started the Goodnight Line at the original KSKU FM 102. As Program Director, Simon brought the Goodnight Line back to KSKU when it moved to 106.1 FM, which became one of KSKU's most successful shows. Other hosts who launched successful radio careers at KSKU include Dan Holiday (who owns and operates the weather forecasting company The Storm Report) and Stephanie Linn, who also hosted the Goodnight Line and went on to be a popular DJ in Manhattan, Kansas, and Topeka, Kansas.

=== Popular shows ===
The Matt and Arock Show was one of the longest running shows in KSKU history. The morning show ran from 2007 until 2011, while also being simulcast on 100.3 KNZS. The show was slated in the afternoon in 2010 and 2011 as well. It was one of the most popular shows in KSKU history, bringing in an average of 12 listeners a day.
