= KLBG (FM) =

- Lindsborg, Kansas; United States
- Broadcast area: Salina, Kansas
- Frequency: 95.5 MHz
- Branding: Smoky Hills Rock 95.5

Programming
- Format: Active rock

Ownership
- Owner: Christofer Shank; (Ad Astra per Aspera Broadcasting, Inc.)
- Sister stations: KMCP, KMPK

History
- First air date: 1988 (as KQNS-FM)
- Former call signs: KQNS-FM (1985–2007); KVOB (2007–2023)
- Former frequencies: 95.9 MHz (1988–1993)
- Call sign meaning: Lindsborg

Technical information
- Licensing authority: FCC
- Facility ID: 3483
- Class: C3
- ERP: 15,500 watts
- HAAT: 127 meters (417 ft)
- Transmitter coordinates: 38°40′00″N 97°41′30″W

Links
- Public license information: Public file; LMS
- Webcast: Listen live
- Website: www.adastraradio.com/klbg

KLBG (95.5 MHz) is a commercial radio station licensed to serve Lindsborg, Kansas, United States. The station is owned by Christofer Shank, through licensee Ad Astra per Aspera Broadcasting, Inc.

== History ==
KLBG started as KQNS-FM in September 1986, then located on 95.9 FM with an ERP of 1.3 kW. At the time, the station aired an easy listening format, and was branded as "Q96." On January 5, 1993, KQNS flipped to a mainstream rock format, branded as "95.9 The Rock." In April 1994, the station moved to 95.5 FM and upgraded their power to 15.5 kW. In September 1994, B-B Broadcasting bought the station from Jerry Davies, who owned KNGL and KBBE in McPherson. On January 13, 1997, the station flipped to adult contemporary as "Star 95.5". In August 2002, Waitt Media bought the station, and rebranded the station as "Lite Rock 95.5." In addition, the station began airing the "Hits & Favorites" format from Citadel Media (now Cumulus Media Networks). In 2005, the station switched satellite feeds to Westwood One's AC format. In 2006, the station rebranded as "OZ 95". In 2007, the station flipped to adult hits, branded as "Bob FM". The station was assigned the KVOB call sign by the Federal Communications Commission on December 1, 2007. A year later, the station switched to Sparknet Communications' national feed of "Jack FM", again retaining the adult hits format.

On December 25, 2012, at Midnight, the station flipped to active rock, branded as "95.5 The Rock." The station began carrying the "Rock 2.0" feed from Dial Global. Due to a technical error, the Jack FM feed and the new format were both heard simultaneously until it was corrected the following day.

The station aired several weekend specialty programs, such as "The House of Hair with Dee Snider", and "Racing Rocks with Riki Rachtman". KVOB also broadcast several local sports teams, including Smoky Valley High School, Bethany College, and the Salina Sirens roller derby. It also aired the NASCAR Sprint Cup Series via the Motor Racing Network and Performance Racing Network.

KVOB would fall silent in March 2022.

As part of then-owner Rocking M Media's bankruptcy reorganization, in which 12 stations in Kansas would be auctioned off to new owners, it was announced on October 31, 2022 that Hutchinson-based Ad Astra Per Aspera Broadcasting was the winning bidder for KVOB and Larned-based KSOB and KNNS for $152,000. While the bankruptcy court had approved the purchase, the sale was officially filed to the FCC on January 9, 2023. Ahead of the closure of the sale, Ad Astra per Aspera had applied a new KLBG call sign for the station, which took effect on March 1.

On January 13, 2023, KVOB would return to the air, this time simulcasting then-sister station KZUH's Top 40/CHR format. Upon Ad Astra per Aspera assuming control of the stations on March 31, 2023, KLBG returned to a mainstream rock format, now branded as "Smoky Hills Rock 95.5."
