= KHMY =

- Pratt, Kansas; United States
- Broadcast area: Hutchinson, Wichita
- Frequency: 93.1 MHz
- Branding: My 93-1

Programming
- Format: Top 40 (CHR)
- Affiliations: Premiere Networks; Kansas State Wildcats

Ownership
- Owner: Eagle Communications, Inc.
- Sister stations: KHUT, KWBW

History
- First air date: February 1, 1980 (as KWLS-FM)
- Former call signs: KWLS-FM (1980–1983); KGLS (1983–1998); KDGB (1998–2003)
- Call sign meaning: "Hutchinson's My 93-1"

Technical information
- Licensing authority: FCC
- Facility ID: 37122
- Class: C
- ERP: 100,000 watts
- HAAT: 302 meters
- Transmitter coordinates: 37°55′43″N 98°18′36″W

Links
- Public license information: Public file; LMS
- Webcast: Listen live
- Website: khmyfm.com

KHMY (93.1 FM), known as "My 93-1" is an FM radio station based in Hutchinson, Kansas, United States, broadcasting a Top 40/CHR format. Licensed to Pratt, the station serves the Hutchinson/Wichita area. It is currently owned by Eagle Communications, Inc. KHMY's studios are located at 9th and Main in Hutchinson, while its transmitter is located south of Plevna.

Since the fall of 2007, KHMY has served as Hutchinson's radio affiliate for Kansas State Wildcats football and men's basketball.

== History ==
93.1 FM officially signed on the air as KWLS-FM on Feb. 1, 1980. On April 4, 1983, the station changed its call sign to KGLS. In the 1980s, it was one of the stations in the "LS Network" of Kansas radio entrepreneur Larry Steckline, whose initials appear at the end of the "KGLS" call sign (a characteristic of most of the stations in the LS Network).

On January 9, 1998, the station changed its call sign to KDGB, and adopted a classic rock format, branded as "Big Dog 93.1." The station then changed to its current call letters of "KHMY" on March 17, 2003.

== Programming ==
On Christmas Day, 2002, at noon, the station flipped to a 1980s-heavy Hot AC format, branded as "My 93-1." The first song played was "Here Is Gone" by The Goo Goo Dolls. The station launched jockless, which lasted until July 7, 2003.

In 2007, KHMY moved away from its emphasis on 1980s music. The slogan "The Best Variety of the 80s, 90s, and Right Now" was dropped and was replaced with "Hutchinson's #1 Hit Music Station." KHMY would continue to be an Adult Top 40 station and a staple in the Hutchinson community over the next 6+ years.

== The Eagle Media Center ==
In April 2007, the studios of My 93-1 moved from Halstead Road on Hutchinson's east side to the new Eagle Media Center in downtown Hutchinson in a building formerly housing Commerce Bank. The Eagle Media Center also houses sister stations KHUT and KWBW.

== Air staff ==
Daren Dunn holds down mornings on My 93-1.
