= KGBK =

- Larned, Kansas; United States
- Broadcast area: Great Bend, Kansas
- Frequency: 98.9 MHz
- Branding: Real Country 98.9 GBK

Programming
- Format: Country
- Affiliations: SRN News; Westwood One; Kansas City Royals

Ownership
- Owner: Christofer Shank; (Ad Astra per Aspera Broadcasting, Inc.)
- Sister stations: KLQR

History
- First air date: 1965 (as KANS-FM at 96.7)
- Former call signs: KANS-FM (1965–1985); KQDF-FM (1985–1995); KGTR (1995–2007); KSOB (2007–2023)
- Former frequencies: 96.7 MHz (1966–2023)
- Call sign meaning: Great Bend, Kansas

Technical information
- Licensing authority: FCC
- Facility ID: 7990
- Class: C3
- ERP: 16,500 watts
- HAAT: 123 meters (404 ft)
- Transmitter coordinates: 38°18′38″N 99°00′48″W

Links
- Public license information: Public file; LMS
- Webcast: Listen live
- Website: www.adastraradio.com/kgbk

KGBK (98.9 FM, "Real Country 98.9 GBK") is a commercial radio station licensed to serve Larned, Kansas, United States. The station is currently owned by Christofer Shank, through licensee Ad Astra per Aspera Broadcasting, Inc.

KGBK broadcasts a gold-based country music music format.

== History ==
KGBK signed on as KANS-FM on November 1, 1965, at 96.7 FM. Initially broadcasting with 910 watts of power, it upgraded to 3,000 watts in the mid-1980s. The station was assigned the KSOB call sign by the Federal Communications Commission on November 27, 2007. It previously aired the ""Jack FM and "Bob FM" adult hits formats.

Former logo

As part of former owner Rocking M Media's bankruptcy reorganization, in which 12 stations in Kansas would be auctioned off to new owners, it was announced on October 31, 2022 that Hutchinson-based Ad Astra per Aspera Broadcasting was the winning bidder for KSOB, KNNS and Salina-based KVOB for $152,000. Ahead of the closure of the sale, Ad Astra per Aspera applied for new KGBK call letters for the station, which took effect on April 1, 2023. On March 31, Ad Astra per Aspera assumed control of the stations, with KGBK shifting to a traditional country format as "Real Country." Concurrent with the sale consummation, Ad Astra per Aspera filed a frequency change for the station to 98.9 MHz, move their transmitter to a site northwest of Pawnee Rock (and therefore, improving their coverage in Great Bend), and increase power to 16,500 watts. The upgrades were completed on August 9, and the station was licensed for operation on 98.9 MHz effective September 7.
