= KBGL =

Contemporary hit radio station in Larned, Kansas

- Larned, Kansas; United States
- Broadcast area: Great Bend–Hays, Kansas
- Frequency: 106.9 MHz
- Branding: Hits 106.9

Programming
- Language: English
- Format: Contemporary hit radio
- Affiliations: AP Radio; Jones Radio Network

Ownership
- Owner: Eagle Radio, Inc.
- Sister stations: KHOK; KVGB; KVGB-FM

History
- First air date: 2001
- Call sign meaning: The Beagle (former brand)

Technical information
- Licensing authority: FCC
- Facility ID: 82841
- Class: C1
- ERP: 100,000 watts
- HAAT: 148 meters (486 ft)
- Transmitter coordinates: 38°27′6″N 99°10′3″W

Links
- Public license information: Public file; LMS
- Website: hits1069.com

KBGL (106.9 FM) is a radio station broadcasting a contemporary hit radio format, licensed to Larned, Kansas. The station is currently owned by Eagle Communications.

On August 22, 2012, at 5 am, KBGL switched from oldies (as "106.9 The Beagle") to contemporary hit radio, branded as "Hits 106.9".
