= KXKU =

Coordinates: 38°15′47″N 97°54′08″W

- Lyons, Kansas; United States
- Broadcast area: Hutchinson, Kansas; Newton, Kansas; McPherson, Kansas
- Frequency: 106.1 MHz
- Branding: Kicks 106.1

Programming
- Format: Country music

Ownership
- Owner: Ad Astra Per Aspera Broadcasting, Inc.

Technical information
- Licensing authority: FCC
- Facility ID: 430
- Class: C1
- ERP: 100,000 watts
- HAAT: 200 meters (660 ft)

Links
- Public license information: Public file; LMS
- Website: www.adastraradio.com/platforms/kxku

KXKU (106.1 FM) is a radio station licensed to Lyons, Kansas. The station broadcasts a country music format and is owned by Ad Astra Per Aspera Broadcasting, Inc.
