= KVGB (AM) =

Radio station in Great Bend, Kansas

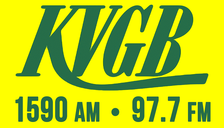
- Great Bend; United States
- Broadcast area: Central Kansas
- Frequency: 1590 KHz

Programming
- Format: Talk radio

Ownership
- Owner: Eagle Communications
- Sister stations: KBGL, KHOK, KVGB-FM

History
- First air date: 1949
- Call sign meaning: Voice of Great Bend

Technical information
- Licensing authority: FCC
- Facility ID: 22150
- Class: B
- Power: 5,000 watts fulltime
- Transmitter coordinates: 38°18′50″N 98°47′36.3″W
- Translator: (95.5 MHz) K238CK (Hoisington)

Links
- Public license information: Public file; LMS
- Website: Official website

KVGB 1590 AM is a radio station of the news and Talk radio format, based in Great Bend, United States. It is owned by Eagle Communications Inc.

Eagle Communications owns other Kansas radio stations in Salina, Hutchinson, Hays, Great Bend, Pratt, Hoisington and Hill City.

One of the oldest radio stations in western Kansas, KVGB first signed on the air in the late 1940s (around 1949) and has maintained a focus on hyper-local content, earning the station's call letters the meaning "Voice of Great Bend". Grover C. Cobb, who came to KVGB in 1948 as General Manager served on the school board, the hospital board, and the city recreation commission. Cobb’s influence extended to the national broadcasting industry; he was instrumental in founding the Kansas Association of Radio Broadcasters in 1951 and was later elected Chairman of the National Association of Broadcasters (NAB) Board in 1967. KVGB was home to one of Central Kansas's most recognized voices, John O'Connor, who began his 40-year career at the station on August 20, 1973. O'Connor's wife, Sally Kroeker, was also a notable figure at the station, serving as KVGB's first female news person when she was hired in 1973.

KVGB went to a 24-hour broadcast schedule on October 14, 2001. KVGB has a long-running program called The Trading Post.
