= KVGB-FM =

Radio station in Great Bend, Kansas

- Great Bend, Kansas; United States
- Broadcast area: West Kansas
- Frequency: 104.3 MHz
- Branding: B104.3 The Point

Programming
- Format: Classic rock

Ownership
- Owner: Eagle Communications
- Sister stations: KBGL, KHOK, KVGB

History
- First air date: 1977
- Call sign meaning: Voice of Great Bend (reflecting AM Station)

Technical information
- Licensing authority: FCC
- Facility ID: 22149
- Class: C1
- ERP: 100,000 watts
- HAAT: 247 meters (810 ft)
- Transmitter coordinates: 38°25′54.04298″N 98°46′19.30465″W

Links
- Public license information: Public file; LMS
- Webcast: Listen live

KVGB-FM (104.3 FM) is a radio station broadcasting a classic rock music format. Licensed to Great Bend, Kansas, United States, the station serves the West Kansas area. The station is currently owned by Eagle Communications.
