= Mass media in Pittsburg, Kansas =

Pittsburg, Kansas is a center of media in southeastern Kansas. The following is a list of media outlets based in the city.

== Print ==
=== Newspapers ===
- Collegio, weekly, the Pittsburg State University student newspaper
- Pittsburg Morning Sun, five times a week

== Radio ==
The following radio stations are licensed to and/or broadcast from Pittsburg:

=== AM ===
| Frequency | Callsign | Format | City of License | Notes |
|---|---|---|---|---|
| 860 | KKOW | Classic Country | Pittsburg, Kansas | - |
| 1340 | KSEK | Country | Pittsburg, Kansas | - |

=== FM ===
| Frequency | Callsign | Format | City of License | Notes |
|---|---|---|---|---|
| 89.9 | KRPS | Public | Pittsburg, Kansas | NPR |
| 96.9 | KKOW-FM | Country | Pittsburg, Kansas | - |
| 99.1 | KSEK-FM | Classic rock | Girard, Kansas | Broadcasts from Pittsburg |
| 101.7 | KHST | Country | Lamar, Missouri | Broadcasts from Pittsburg |
| 103.5 | KWXD | Album-oriented rock | Asbury, Missouri | Broadcasts from Pittsburg |

== Television ==
Pittsburg is the second principal city of the Joplin-Pittsburg television market.

The following television stations are licensed to and/or broadcast from Pittsburg:

| Display Channel | Network | Callsign | City of License | Notes |
|---|---|---|---|---|
| 7.1 | CBS | KOAM-TV | Pittsburg, Kansas | - |
| 7.2 | Fox | KOAM-TV | Pittsburg, Kansas | Simulcast of KFJX |
| 14.1 | Fox | KFJX | Pittsburg, Kansas | - |
| 49.1 | - | KPJO-LD | Pittsburg, Kansas | - |

== See also ==
- Four-state area § Media
