= KSEK =

KSEK may refer to:

- KSEK (AM), a radio station (1340 AM) licensed to Pittsburg, Kansas, United States
- KSEK-FM, a radio station (99.1 FM) licensed to Girard, Kansas, United States
