= KKOW =

KKOW may refer to:

- KKOW (AM), a radio station (860 AM) licensed to Pittsburg, Kansas, United States
- KKOW-FM, a radio station (96.9 FM) licensed to Pittsburg, Kansas, United States
