= KBTN =

KBTN may refer to:

- KBTN (AM), a radio station (1420 AM) licensed to Neosho, Missouri, United States
- KBTN-FM, a radio station (99.7 FM) licensed to Neosho, Missouri, United States
