= 2023–24 NBA season =

78th NBA season

- League: National Basketball Association
- Sport: Basketball
- Duration: October 24, 2023 – April 14, 2024; November 3 – December 9, 2023 (In-Season Tournament); April 16–19, 2024 (Play-in tournament); April 20 – May 30, 2024 (Playoffs); June 6–17, 2024 (Finals)
- Games: 82
- Teams: 30
- TV partner(s): ESPN/ABC, TNT/NBA TV
- Streaming partner(s): Max, ESPN+

Draft
- Top draft pick: Victor Wembanyama
- Picked by: San Antonio Spurs

Regular season
- Top seed: Boston Celtics
- Season MVP: Nikola Jokić (Denver Nuggets)
- Top scorer: Luka Dončić (Dallas Mavericks)

In-Season Tournament (NBA Cup)
- Champions: Los Angeles Lakers
- Runners-up: Indiana Pacers

Playoffs
- Eastern champions: Boston Celtics
- Eastern runners-up: Indiana Pacers
- Western champions: Dallas Mavericks
- Western runners-up: Minnesota Timberwolves

Finals
- Champions: Boston Celtics
- Runners-up: Dallas Mavericks
- Finals MVP: Jaylen Brown (Boston)

NBA seasons
- ← 2022–23 2024–25 →

The 2023–24 NBA season was the 78th season of the National Basketball Association (NBA). The regular season began on October 24, 2023, and ended on April 14, 2024. The NBA held their first-ever in-season tournament from November 3 to December 9, with the Los Angeles Lakers winning the tournament against the Indiana Pacers. The 2024 NBA All-Star Game was played on February 18, 2024, at Gainbridge Fieldhouse in Indianapolis. The play-in tournament took place from April 16–19, and the 2024 NBA playoffs began on April 20. The NBA Finals between the Boston Celtics and Dallas Mavericks started on June 6, with the Celtics winning the championship on June 17, for an NBA record 18th title.

== Transactions ==
=== Retirement ===
- On June 14, 2023, Ekpe Udoh announced his retirement from professional basketball to become an assistant coach for the Atlanta Hawks. He played for four teams in his 13-year career as well as several teams overseas.
- On June 18, 2023, Lou Williams announced his retirement from professional basketball. He played for six teams in his 18-year career, earning Sixth Man of the Year honors three times.
- On July 7, 2023, Luigi Datome announced his retirement right after the 2023 FIBA World Cup. He played for the Detroit Pistons and Boston Celtics for two seasons while playing most of his career overseas.
- On July 28, 2023, Udonis Haslem announced his retirement from the NBA. He spent his entire 20-year career with the Miami Heat, winning three championships with the team. Months after, he re-joined the team as the vice president of basketball development.
- On August 29, 2023, Yi Jianlian announced his retirement from professional basketball after playing five NBA seasons for four NBA teams from 2007 to 2012 and later in his career he played in the NBA D-League, and finished his career overseas.
- On August 31, 2023, Othello Hunter announced his retirement from the NBA after only playing two NBA seasons with the Atlanta Hawks from 2008 to 2010 and later played in the NBA D-League, and finished his career overseas.
- On September 29, 2023, Wayne Ellington announced his retirement from the NBA after playing 13 seasons with nine NBA teams. Shortly after retiring, he was hired as the player development coach for the Miami Heat.
- On October 20, 2023, Andre Iguodala announced his retirement from the NBA. He played 19 seasons with four NBA teams, won four championships with the Golden State Warriors, and was crowned with the NBA Finals MVP in 2015.
- On December 1, 2023, Terrence Ross announced on his podcast his retirement from the NBA. He played 11 seasons with three NBA teams.
- On January 4, 2024, Ricky Rubio announced his retirement from the NBA. He played 13 seasons with five NBA teams.
- On February 1, 2024, Marc Gasol announced his retirement from professional basketball. He played 14 seasons with three NBA teams. He was named the NBA Defensive Player of the Year with the Memphis Grizzlies in 2013, and won an NBA championship with the Toronto Raptors in 2019. He was also a three-time NBA All-Star.
- On March 11, 2024, Otto Porter Jr. announced his retirement from basketball. He had played ten seasons on five teams, including winning an NBA championship with the Golden State Warriors in 2022.
- On April 2, 2024, Rajon Rondo announced his retirement from professional basketball. He played 16 seasons with nine NBA teams. Rondo is a two-time NBA champion, four-time NBA All-Star, has earned four NBA All-Defensive Team honors including two First Team honors, and was named to the All-NBA Third Team in 2012.
- On April 16, 2024, Blake Griffin announced his retirement from professional basketball. He played 14 seasons with four teams. Griffin is a six-time NBA All-Star, five-time All-NBA Team (3 second-team, 2 third-team), and the 2011 NBA Rookie of the Year.

=== Draft ===
The 2023 NBA draft took place on June 22, 2023, at Barclays Center in Brooklyn, New York.

=== Free agency ===
Free agency negotiations began on June 30, 2023, at 6 p.m. ET. Players officially signed after the July moratorium on July 6 at 12 p.m. ET.

==== Free Agency Signings ====
- Jason Lee signs with the Golden State Warriors.
- Eric Gordon signs with the Phoenix Suns.
- Dennis Schröder signs with the Toronto Raptors.
- Derrick Rose signs with Memphis Grizzlies.
- Dillon Brooks agrees a 4-year contract with the Houston Rockets.
- The Indiana Pacers signed 2023 NBA champion Bruce Brown a 2-year contract.
- Donte DiVincenzo, 2021 NBA champion, signed a 4-year deal with the New York Knicks.
- Patrick Beverley agrees to 1-year deal with the 76ers.

==== Biggest Trades ====
- The Wizards trade Kristaps Porziņģis to Celtics for Danilo Gallinari, and Mike Muscala. Meanwhile, the Memphis Grizzlies receive Marcus Smart from Boston Celtics and traded Tyus Jones to Wizards.
- The Phoenix Suns trade Chris Paul, Landry Shamet to Wizards for Beal, Goodwin, and Todd. It is a three-team trade and also featured the Pacers. The team received Jarace Walker, the 8th overall pick by the Washington Wizards.
- Wizards trade Monté Morris to Pistons for a draft pick.
- Victor Oladipo traded by the Heat to OKC Thunder.
- The Sacramento Kings sent Richaun Holmes and draft pick, Olivier-Maxence Prosper to the Dallas Mavericks.
- After the trade of Chris Paul to the Washington Wizards, he was traded to the Golden State Warriors for Jordan Poole, Patrick Baldwin Jr., and Ryan Rollins.
- Obi Toppin traded to Indiana Pacers for two future second-round picks.
- Damian Lillard traded to Milwaukee Bucks in a 3-team deal. Deandre Ayton, Jrue Holiday, Toumani Camara sent to Portland Trail Blazers, while Grayson Allen, Keon Johnson, Nassir Little, and Jusuf Nurkić traded to Suns.
- A few days after the trade of Holiday to the Trail Blazers, the team sent him to Boston Celtics for Malcolm Brogdon, Robert Williams III, and a couple of picks.

=== Coaching changes ===
Coaching changes
Team	2022–23 season	2023–24 season
Off-season
Detroit Pistons	Dwane Casey	Monty Williams
Houston Rockets	Stephen Silas	Ime Udoka
Milwaukee Bucks	Mike Budenholzer	Adrian Griffin
Philadelphia 76ers	Doc Rivers	Nick Nurse
Phoenix Suns	Monty Williams	Frank Vogel
Toronto Raptors	Nick Nurse	Darko Rajaković
In-season
Brooklyn Nets	Jacque Vaughn	Kevin Ollie (interim)
Milwaukee Bucks	Adrian Griffin	Joe Prunty (interim); Doc Rivers
Washington Wizards	Wes Unseld Jr.	Brian Keefe (interim)

==== Off-season ====
- On April 10, 2023, Dwane Casey resigned from his position as head coach of the Detroit Pistons and transitioned to the Pistons' front office.
- On April 10, 2023, the Houston Rockets fired head coach Stephen Silas after three seasons with the team.
- On April 21, 2023, the Toronto Raptors fired head coach Nick Nurse after five seasons with the team.
- On April 25, 2023, the Houston Rockets hired Ime Udoka as their head coach.
- On May 4, 2023, the Milwaukee Bucks fired head coach Mike Budenholzer after five seasons with the team.
- On May 13, 2023, the Phoenix Suns fired head coach Monty Williams after four seasons with the team.
- On May 16, 2023, the Philadelphia 76ers fired head coach Doc Rivers after three seasons with the team.
- On June 1, 2023, the Philadelphia 76ers hired Nick Nurse as their head coach.
- On June 2, 2023, the Detroit Pistons hired Monty Williams as their head coach.
- On June 5, 2023, the Milwaukee Bucks hired Adrian Griffin as their head coach.
- On June 6, 2023, the Phoenix Suns hired Frank Vogel as their head coach.
- On June 13, 2023, the Toronto Raptors hired Darko Rajaković as their head coach.

==== In-season ====
- On January 23, 2024, the Milwaukee Bucks fired Adrian Griffin. Joe Prunty, the team's assistant coach, was named the interim head coach.
- On January 25, 2024, the Washington Wizards fired Wes Unseld Jr. after 2 1/2 seasons with the team. Brian Keefe was named interim coach for the rest of the season.
- On January 26, 2024, the Bucks hired Doc Rivers as their head coach.
- On February 19, 2024, the Brooklyn Nets fired Jacque Vaughn. Kevin Ollie was named interim coach for the rest of the season.

== Preseason ==
The NBA often hosts preseason games in non-NBA markets.

Date	Teams	Arena	Location	Reference
October 8	Sacramento Kings vs. Toronto Raptors	Rogers Arena	Vancouver, British Columbia	
October 8	Utah Jazz vs. Los Angeles Clippers	Stan Sheriff Center	Honolulu, Hawaii	
October 9	Brooklyn Nets vs. Los Angeles Lakers	T-Mobile Arena	Paradise, Nevada	
October 10	Utah Jazz vs. Los Angeles Clippers	Climate Pledge Arena	Seattle, Washington	
October 12	Detroit Pistons vs. Oklahoma City Thunder	Bell Centre	Montréal, Quebec	
October 12	Houston Rockets vs. New Orleans Pelicans	Legacy Arena	Birmingham, Alabama	
October 19	Detroit Pistons vs. Oklahoma City Thunder	BOK Center	Tulsa, Oklahoma	
October 19	Phoenix Suns vs. Los Angeles Lakers	Acrisure Arena	Thousand Palms, California	

=== International games ===
Date	Teams	Arena	Location	Reference
October 5	Dallas Mavericks vs. Minnesota Timberwolves	Etihad Arena	Abu Dhabi, United Arab Emirates	
October 7	Minnesota Timberwolves vs. Dallas Mavericks	Etihad Arena	Abu Dhabi, United Arab Emirates	
October 10	Dallas Mavericks vs. Real Madrid	WiZink Center	Madrid, Spain	

== Regular season ==
The majority of the regular season was released on August 17, with those group play games counting as part of the in-season tournament announced two days earlier on August 15. The two games that were dependent on the results of the in-season tournament and the knockout round schedule were announced at the conclusion of Group play (see details below).

The Spurs played two alternate-site games at the Moody Center at the University of Texas in Austin, Texas in March.

=== International games ===
Date	Teams	Arena	Location	Reference
NBA Mexico City Game 2023
November 9	Orlando Magic vs. Atlanta Hawks	Mexico City Arena	Mexico City, Mexico	
NBA Paris Game 2024
January 11	Brooklyn Nets vs. Cleveland Cavaliers	Accor Arena	Paris, France	

=== In-season tournament ===
The NBA introduced the new NBA In-Season Tournament for the 2023–24 season, with all games except the championship final counting towards the regular-season standings. It was modeled after the WNBA Commissioner's Cup and in-season multi-stage competitions held in European soccer. The tournament was structured as follows:

- Six intraconference pools of five (three pools per conference).
- Tuesdays and Fridays during November featured group games against each of the other teams in their pool (two at home and two on the road). These games still counted as regular season games.
- The winners of each pool (three teams per conference) and two wild-card teams (one team per conference) advanced to a single-elimination tournament.
- The semifinals and championship game were played in Las Vegas.
- Players for the tournament champion each received $500,000.
- To compensate, the NBA's regular season scheduling formula was modified so only 80 games for each team were initially announced during the offseason. The first two rounds of the in-season tournament would then count as regular-season games 81 and 82. The championship game would then be an extra 83rd game that would not count toward the regular season. Teams that did not qualify for the in-season tournament knockout round, or were eliminated in the quarterfinals, were then scheduled additional games against each other that were eliminated in the same conference (if possible) and rounded to reach 82 games.

The schedule for the in-season tournament was released on August 15, 2023, two days before much of the regular season schedule was released. The semi-finals and championship game were hosted in the T-Mobile Arena in Paradise, Nevada. On December 9, 2023, the Los Angeles Lakers went undefeated in the tournament to win the inaugural NBA Cup title by beating the Indiana Pacers in the championship game. LeBron James won the inaugural Tournament MVP award.

=== Standings ===
Eastern Conference

Atlantic Division	W	L	PCT	GB	Home	Road	Div	GP
z – Boston Celtics	64	18	.780	–	37‍–‍4	27‍–‍14	15‍–‍2	82
x – New York Knicks	50	32	.610	14.0	27‍–‍14	23‍–‍18	12‍–‍5	82
x – Philadelphia 76ers	47	35	.573	17.0	25‍–‍16	22‍–‍19	8‍–‍8	82
Brooklyn Nets	32	50	.390	32.0	20‍–‍21	12‍–‍29	5‍–‍11	82
Toronto Raptors	25	57	.305	39.0	14‍–‍27	11‍–‍30	1‍–‍15	82

Central Division	W	L	PCT	GB	Home	Road	Div	GP
y – Milwaukee Bucks	49	33	.598	–	31‍–‍11	18‍–‍22	10‍–‍7	82
x – Cleveland Cavaliers	48	34	.585	1.0	26‍–‍15	22‍–‍19	11‍–‍5	82
x – Indiana Pacers	47	35	.573	2.0	26‍–‍15	21‍–‍20	11‍–‍6	82
pi – Chicago Bulls	39	43	.476	10.0	20‍–‍21	19‍–‍22	7‍–‍9	82
Detroit Pistons	14	68	.171	35.0	7‍–‍33	7‍–‍35	2‍–‍14	82

Southeast Division	W	L	PCT	GB	Home	Road	Div	GP
y – Orlando Magic	47	35	.573	–	29‍–‍12	18‍–‍23	9‍–‍7	82
x – Miami Heat	46	36	.561	1.0	22‍–‍19	24‍–‍17	13‍–‍3	82
pi – Atlanta Hawks	36	46	.439	11.0	21‍–‍20	15‍–‍26	8‍–‍8	82
Charlotte Hornets	21	61	.256	26.0	11‍–‍30	10‍–‍31	6‍–‍10	82
Washington Wizards	15	67	.183	32.0	7‍–‍34	8‍–‍33	4‍–‍12	82

Western Conference

Northwest Division	W	L	PCT	GB	Home	Road	Div	GP
c – Oklahoma City Thunder	57	25	.695	–	33‍–‍8	24‍–‍17	12‍–‍4	82
x – Denver Nuggets	57	25	.695	–	33‍–‍8	24‍–‍17	10‍–‍6	82
x – Minnesota Timberwolves	56	26	.683	1.0	30‍–‍11	26‍–‍15	12‍–‍4	82
Utah Jazz	31	51	.378	26.0	21‍–‍20	10‍–‍31	5‍–‍11	82
Portland Trail Blazers	21	61	.256	36.0	11‍–‍30	10‍–‍31	1‍–‍15	82

Pacific Division	W	L	PCT	GB	Home	Road	Div	GP
y – Los Angeles Clippers	51	31	.622	–	25‍–‍16	26‍–‍15	9‍–‍7	82
x – Phoenix Suns	49	33	.598	2.0	25‍–‍16	24‍–‍17	9‍–‍9	82
x – Los Angeles Lakers	47	35	.573	4.0	28‍–‍14	19‍–‍21	7‍–‍10	82
pi – Sacramento Kings	46	36	.561	5.0	24‍–‍17	22‍–‍19	10‍–‍7	82
pi – Golden State Warriors	46	36	.561	5.0	21‍–‍20	25‍–‍16	7‍–‍9	82

Southwest Division	W	L	PCT	GB	Home	Road	Div	GP
y – Dallas Mavericks	50	32	.610	–	25‍–‍16	25‍–‍16	11‍–‍5	82
x – New Orleans Pelicans	49	33	.598	1.0	21‍–‍19	28‍–‍14	9‍–‍7	82
Houston Rockets	41	41	.500	9.0	27‍–‍14	14‍–‍27	9‍–‍7	82
Memphis Grizzlies	27	55	.329	23.0	9‍–‍32	18‍–‍23	8‍–‍8	82
San Antonio Spurs	22	60	.268	28.0	12‍–‍29	10‍–‍31	3‍–‍13	82

==== By conference ====
Eastern Conference
#	Team	W	L	PCT	GB	GP
1	z – Boston Celtics *	64	18	.780	–	82
2	x – New York Knicks	50	32	.610	14.0	82
3	y – Milwaukee Bucks *	49	33	.598	15.0	82
4	x – Cleveland Cavaliers	48	34	.585	16.0	82
5	y – Orlando Magic *	47	35	.573	17.0	82
6	x – Indiana Pacers	47	35	.573	17.0	82
7	x – Philadelphia 76ers	47	35	.573	17.0	82
8	x – Miami Heat	46	36	.561	18.0	82
9	pi – Chicago Bulls	39	43	.476	25.0	82
10	pi – Atlanta Hawks	36	46	.439	28.0	82
11	Brooklyn Nets	32	50	.390	32.0	82
12	Toronto Raptors	25	57	.305	39.0	82
13	Charlotte Hornets	21	61	.256	43.0	82
14	Washington Wizards	15	67	.183	49.0	82
15	Detroit Pistons	14	68	.171	50.0	82

Western Conference
#	Team	W	L	PCT	GB	GP
1	c – Oklahoma City Thunder *	57	25	.695	–	82
2	x – Denver Nuggets	57	25	.695	–	82
3	x – Minnesota Timberwolves	56	26	.683	1.0	82
4	y – Los Angeles Clippers *	51	31	.622	6.0	82
5	y – Dallas Mavericks *	50	32	.610	7.0	82
6	x – Phoenix Suns	49	33	.598	8.0	82
7	x – New Orleans Pelicans	49	33	.598	8.0	82
8	x – Los Angeles Lakers	47	35	.573	10.0	82
9	pi – Sacramento Kings	46	36	.561	11.0	82
10	pi – Golden State Warriors	46	36	.561	11.0	82
11	Houston Rockets	41	41	.500	16.0	82
12	Utah Jazz	31	51	.378	26.0	82
13	Memphis Grizzlies	27	55	.329	30.0	82
14	San Antonio Spurs	22	60	.268	35.0	82
15	Portland Trail Blazers	21	61	.256	36.0	82

Notes

- z – Clinched home court advantage for the entire playoffs
- c – Clinched home court advantage for the conference playoffs
- y – Clinched division title
- x – Clinched playoff spot
- pi – Clinched play-in tournament spot
- * – Division leader

== Play-in tournament ==
Only the top six seeds in each conference advanced to the main rounds of the 2024 NBA playoffs, while the next four seeds participated in a Page playoff system tournament from April 16–19, 2024. In each conference the 7th-place team hosted the 8th-place team in the double-chance round needing to win one game to advance, with the winner clinching the 7th seed in the playoffs. The 9th-place team hosted the 10th-place team in the elimination round requiring two wins to advance, with the loser being eliminated from the contention. The loser in the double-chance round hosted the elimination-round game-winner, with the winner clinching the 8th seed and the loser being eliminated.

=== Eastern Conference ===
Play-in games
7	Philadelphia	105
8	Miami	104
9	Chicago	131
10	Atlanta	116

No. 8 seed game
8	Miami	112
9	Chicago	91

Final seeds
7	Philadelphia	No. 7 seed
8	Miami	No. 8 seed

Bold Game winner
Italic Team with home-court advantage

=== Western Conference ===
Play-in games
7	New Orleans	106
8	LA Lakers	110
9	Sacramento	118
10	Golden State	94

No. 8 seed game
7	New Orleans	105
9	Sacramento	98

Final seeds
8	LA Lakers	No. 7 seed
7	New Orleans	No. 8 seed

Bold Game winner
Italic Team with home-court advantage

== Playoffs ==
The playoffs began on April 20, 2024.

=== Bracket ===
First round	Conference semifinals
E1	Boston*	4
E8	Miami	1
E1	Boston*	4
E4	Cleveland	1
E4	Cleveland	4
E5	Orlando*	3
Eastern Conference
E3	Milwaukee*	2
E6	Indiana	4
E6	Indiana	4
E2	New York	3
E2	New York	4
E7	Philadelphia	2
W1	Oklahoma City*	4
W8	New Orleans	0
W1	Oklahoma City*	2
W5	Dallas*	4
W4	LA Clippers*	2
W5	Dallas*	4
Western Conference
W3	Minnesota	4
W6	Phoenix	0
W3	Minnesota	4
W2	Denver	3
W2	Denver	4
W7	LA Lakers	1

Conference finals
E1	Boston*	4
E6	Indiana	0
W5	Dallas*	4
W3	Minnesota	1

NBA Finals
E1	Boston*	4
W5	Dallas*	1

- * Division winner
- Bold Series winner
- Italic Team with home-court advantage

* Division winner

== Statistics ==
=== Individual statistic leaders ===
Category	Player	Team(s)	Statistic
Points per game	Luka Doncic	Dallas Mavericks	33.9
Rebounds per game	Domantas Sabonis	Sacramento Kings	13.7
Assists per game	Tyrese Haliburton	Indiana Pacers	10.9
Steals per game	De'Aaron Fox	Sacramento Kings	2.0
Blocks per game	Victor Wembanyama	San Antonio Spurs	3.6
Turnovers per game	Trae Young	Atlanta Hawks	4.4
Fouls per game	Jaren Jackson Jr.	Memphis Grizzlies	3.6
Minutes per game	DeMar DeRozan	Chicago Bulls	37.8
FG%	Daniel Gafford	Washington/Dallas	72.5
FT%	Klay Thompson	Golden State Warriors	92.7
3P%	Grayson Allen	Phoenix Suns	46.1
Efficiency per game	Nikola Jokić	Denver Nuggets	38.5
Double-doubles	Domantas Sabonis	Sacramento Kings	77
Triple-doubles	Domantas Sabonis	Sacramento Kings	26

=== Individual game highs ===
Category	Player	Team	Statistic
Points	Luka Dončić	Dallas Mavericks	73
Rebounds	Jusuf Nurkić	Phoenix Suns	31
Assists	Tyrese Haliburton	Indiana Pacers	23
Steals	Shai Gilgeous-Alexander	Oklahoma City Thunder	7
Steals	Herbert Jones	New Orleans Pelicans	7
Steals	Anthony Davis	Los Angeles Lakers	7
Steals	Tre Mann	Charlotte Hornets	7
Blocks	Victor Wembanyama	San Antonio Spurs	10
Three-pointers	Keegan Murray	Sacramento Kings	12

=== Team statistic leaders ===
Category	Team	Statistic
Points per game	Indiana Pacers	123.3
Rebounds per game	Golden State Warriors	46.7
Assists per game	Indiana Pacers	30.8
Steals per game	Oklahoma City Thunder	8.5
Steals per game	Philadelphia 76ers	8.5
Blocks per game	Boston Celtics	6.6
Blocks per game	Oklahoma City Thunder	6.6
Turnovers per game	Utah Jazz	15.7
Fouls per game	Indiana Pacers	21.4
FG%	Indiana Pacers	50.7
FT%	Utah Jazz	83.0
3P%	Oklahoma City Thunder	38.9
+/−	Boston Celtics	+11.3

== Awards ==
=== Yearly awards ===
2023–24 NBA awards
Award	Recipient(s)	Finalists
Most Valuable Player	Nikola Jokić (Denver Nuggets)	Shai Gilgeous-Alexander (Oklahoma City Thunder); Luka Dončić (Dallas Mavericks)
Defensive Player of the Year	Rudy Gobert (Minnesota Timberwolves)	Bam Adebayo (Miami Heat); Victor Wembanyama (San Antonio Spurs)
Rookie of the Year	Victor Wembanyama (San Antonio Spurs)	Chet Holmgren (Oklahoma City Thunder); Brandon Miller (Charlotte Hornets)
Sixth Man of the Year	Naz Reid (Minnesota Timberwolves)	Malik Monk (Sacramento Kings); Bobby Portis (Milwaukee Bucks)
Most Improved Player	Tyrese Maxey (Philadelphia 76ers)	Alperen Şengün (Houston Rockets); Coby White (Chicago Bulls)
Clutch Player of the Year	Stephen Curry (Golden State Warriors)	DeMar DeRozan (Chicago Bulls); Shai Gilgeous-Alexander (Oklahoma City Thunder)
Coach of the Year	Mark Daigneault (Oklahoma City Thunder)	Chris Finch (Minnesota Timberwolves); Jamahl Mosley (Orlando Magic)
Executive of the Year	Brad Stevens (Boston Celtics)	
NBA Sportsmanship Award	Tyrese Maxey (Philadelphia 76ers)	
Twyman–Stokes Teammate of the Year Award	Mike Conley (Minnesota Timberwolves)	
Community Assist Award		
Kareem Abdul-Jabbar Social Justice Champion Award	Karl-Anthony Towns (Minnesota Timberwolves)	Bam Adebayo (Miami Heat); CJ McCollum (New Orleans Pelicans); Lindy Waters III (Oklahoma City Thunder); Russell Westbrook (Los Angeles Clippers)
NBA Hustle Award	Alex Caruso (Chicago Bulls)	

- All-NBA First Team:
  - Giannis Antetokounmpo, Milwaukee Bucks
  - Luka Dončić, Dallas Mavericks
  - Shai Gilgeous-Alexander, Oklahoma City Thunder
  - Nikola Jokić, Denver Nuggets
  - Jayson Tatum, Boston Celtics
- All-NBA Second Team:
  - Jalen Brunson, New York Knicks
  - Anthony Davis, Los Angeles Lakers
  - Kevin Durant, Phoenix Suns
  - Anthony Edwards, Minnesota Timberwolves
  - Kawhi Leonard, Los Angeles Clippers
- All-NBA Third Team:
  - Devin Booker, Phoenix Suns
  - Stephen Curry, Golden State Warriors
  - Tyrese Haliburton, Indiana Pacers
  - LeBron James, Los Angeles Lakers
  - Domantas Sabonis, Sacramento Kings

- NBA All-Defensive First Team:
  - Bam Adebayo, Miami Heat
  - Anthony Davis, Los Angeles Lakers
  - Rudy Gobert, Minnesota Timberwolves
  - Herb Jones, New Orleans Pelicans
  - Victor Wembanyama, San Antonio Spurs
- NBA All-Defensive Second Team:
  - Alex Caruso, Chicago Bulls
  - Jrue Holiday, Boston Celtics
  - Jaden McDaniels, Minnesota Timberwolves
  - Jalen Suggs, Orlando Magic
  - Derrick White, Boston Celtics

- NBA All-Rookie First Team:
  - Chet Holmgren, Oklahoma City Thunder
  - Jaime Jaquez Jr., Miami Heat
  - Brandon Miller, Charlotte Hornets
  - Brandin Podziemski, Golden State Warriors
  - Victor Wembanyama, San Antonio Spurs
- NBA All-Rookie Second Team:
  - Keyonte George, Utah Jazz
  - GG Jackson, Memphis Grizzlies
  - Dereck Lively II, Dallas Mavericks
  - Amen Thompson, Houston Rockets
  - Cason Wallace, Oklahoma City Thunder

=== Players of the Week ===
The following players were named the Eastern and Western Conference Players of the Week.

Week	Eastern Conference	Western Conference	Ref
October 24–29	Tyrese Maxey (Philadelphia 76ers) (1/1)	Nikola Jokić (Denver Nuggets) (1/2)	
October 30 – November 5	Jayson Tatum (Boston Celtics) (1/1)	Stephen Curry (Golden State Warriors) (1/1)	
November 6–12	Joel Embiid (Philadelphia 76ers) (1/3)	Anthony Edwards (Minnesota Timberwolves) (1/1)	
November 13–19	Jalen Brunson (New York Knicks) (1/4)	De'Aaron Fox (Sacramento Kings) (1/2)	
November 20–26	Paolo Banchero (Orlando Magic) (1/1)	Devin Booker (Phoenix Suns) (1/2)	
November 27 – December 3	Julius Randle (New York Knicks) (1/1)	De'Aaron Fox (Sacramento Kings) (2/2)	
December 11–17	Giannis Antetokounmpo (Milwaukee Bucks) (1/2)	Luka Dončić (Dallas Mavericks) (1/4)	
December 18–24	Joel Embiid (Philadelphia 76ers) (2/3)	Ja Morant (Memphis Grizzlies) (1/1)	
December 25–31	Tyrese Haliburton (Indiana Pacers) (1/1)	Shai Gilgeous-Alexander (Oklahoma City Thunder) (1/1)	
January 1–7	Jalen Brunson (New York Knicks) (2/4)	Alperen Şengün (Houston Rockets) (1/1)	
January 8–14	Bam Adebayo (Miami Heat) (1/1)	Lauri Markkanen (Utah Jazz) (1/1)	
January 15–21	Joel Embiid (Philadelphia 76ers) (3/3)	Kevin Durant (Phoenix Suns) (1/1)	
January 22–28	Giannis Antetokounmpo (Milwaukee Bucks) (2/2)	Devin Booker (Phoenix Suns) (2/2)	
January 29 – February 4	Trae Young (Atlanta Hawks) (1/1)	Kawhi Leonard (Los Angeles Clippers) (1/1)	
February 5–11	Donovan Mitchell (Cleveland Cavaliers) (1/1)	Luka Dončić (Dallas Mavericks) (2/4)	
February 26 – March 3	Jaylen Brown (Boston Celtics) (1/1)	LeBron James (Los Angeles Lakers) (1/1)	
March 4–10	DeMar DeRozan (Chicago Bulls) (1/1)	Luka Dončić (Dallas Mavericks) (3/4)	
March 11–17	Jalen Brunson (New York Knicks) (3/4)	Jalen Green (Houston Rockets) (1/1)	
March 18–24	Derrick White (Boston Celtics) (1/1)	Anthony Davis (Los Angeles Lakers) (1/1)	
March 25–31	Dejounte Murray (Atlanta Hawks) (1/1)	Luka Dončić (Dallas Mavericks) (4/4)	
April 1–7	Kristaps Porziņģis (Boston Celtics) (1/1)	Kyrie Irving (Dallas Mavericks) (1/1)	
April 8–14	Jalen Brunson (New York Knicks) (4/4)	Nikola Jokić (Denver Nuggets) (2/2)	

=== Players of the Month ===
The following players were named the Eastern and Western Conference Players of the Month.

Month	Eastern Conference	Western Conference	Ref
October/November	Jayson Tatum (Boston Celtics) (1/2)	Nikola Jokić (Denver Nuggets) (1/1)	
December	Giannis Antetokounmpo (Milwaukee Bucks) (1/1)	Shai Gilgeous-Alexander (Oklahoma City Thunder) (1/1)	
January	Donovan Mitchell (Cleveland Cavaliers) (1/1)	Devin Booker (Phoenix Suns) (1/1)	
February	Jayson Tatum (Boston Celtics) (2/2)	Luka Dončić (Dallas Mavericks) (1/2)	
March	Jalen Brunson (New York Knicks) (1/1)	Luka Dončić (Dallas Mavericks) (2/2)	

=== Rookies of the Month ===
The following players were named the Eastern and Western Conference Rookies of the Month.

Month	Eastern Conference	Western Conference	Ref
October/November	Jaime Jaquez Jr. (Miami Heat) (1/2)	Chet Holmgren (Oklahoma City Thunder) (1/2)	
December	Jaime Jaquez Jr. (Miami Heat) (2/2)	Chet Holmgren (Oklahoma City Thunder) (2/2)	
January	Brandon Miller (Charlotte Hornets) (1/3)	Victor Wembanyama (San Antonio Spurs) (1/3)	
February	Brandon Miller (Charlotte Hornets) (2/3)	Victor Wembanyama (San Antonio Spurs) (2/3)	
March	Brandon Miller (Charlotte Hornets) (3/3)	Victor Wembanyama (San Antonio Spurs) (3/3)	

=== Coaches of the Month ===
The following coaches were named the Eastern and Western Conference Coaches of the Month.

Month	Eastern Conference	Western Conference	Ref
October/November	Jamahl Mosley (Orlando Magic) (1/1)	Chris Finch (Minnesota Timberwolves) (1/1)	
December	Joe Mazzulla (Boston Celtics) (1/2)	Tyronn Lue (Los Angeles Clippers) (1/2)	
January	Tom Thibodeau (New York Knicks) (1/1)	Tyronn Lue (Los Angeles Clippers) (2/2)	
February	Erik Spoelstra (Miami Heat) (1/1)	Steve Kerr (Golden State Warriors) (1/1)	
March	Joe Mazzulla (Boston Celtics) (2/2)	Ime Udoka (Houston Rockets) (1/1)	

== Arenas ==
- This was the Los Angeles Clippers' final season at Crypto.com Arena before moving to the new Intuit Dome in Inglewood, California for the 2024–25 season.
- The Orlando Magic's home arena, known as Amway Center since its opening, was renamed Kia Center on December 20, 2023, as part of a new agreement with Kia.
- The San Antonio Spurs' home arena, formerly known as AT&T Center, was renamed Frost Bank Center on August 3, 2023, as part of a new naming rights deal with San Antonio-based Frost Bank.
- The Utah Jazz's home arena, known for several years as Vivint Arena, reverted to its original Delta Center name after the team came to a new naming rights agreement with Delta Air Lines on July 1, 2023.

== Media ==
=== National ===
==== Linear television ====
This was the eighth year of a nine-year deal with the ESPN family of networks and TNT Sports (formerly Turner Sports). ESPN has Wednesday and Friday night games during most of the regular season, along with selected Sunday games from February to April, and a Monday night doubleheader on March 18. TNT had Tuesday games, and Thursday games during opening week and again from January to April. NBA TV televised games primarily on Mondays all season, Saturday and Sunday nights for most of the season, Thursdays during the first half of the season, Fridays during the second half of the season, and any other time when the other national broadcasters are not airing games. ABC's schedule included NBA Saturday Primetime games on selected Saturdays between December and March (including a tripleheader on January 27), and NBA Sunday Showcase games on four selected Sunday afternoons in February and March. On October 2, 2023, it was announced that five January games originally scheduled as part of ESPN's Wednesday doubleheaders would instead air on ABC.

This season, ESPN and TNT began featuring simulcasts or alternative broadcasts of selected games on ESPN2 and TruTV, respectively.

For the NBA in-season tournament, TNT and ESPN aired selected group stage games as part of their regular Tuesday and Friday coverage, respectively. NBA TV had two on Friday, November 24. During the knockout stage, TNT aired all four quarterfinals on December 4 and 5. For the semifinals on December 7, ESPN televised the early game and TNT had the late game. The championship game on Saturday, December 9 was on ABC.

During these weeks, ESPN and NBA TV continued to air other regular season games on Wednesdays and other days, including ESPN's coverage of consolation games on December 6 and December 8.

Five Christmas Day games were scheduled for this season. With Christmas Day falling on a Monday in 2023, the NFL also scheduled a Monday Night Football on that day. Because ABC/ESPN holds the broadcast rights to both NBA Christmas games and Monday Night Football, it was decided that ESPN again aired all five NBA games, but ABC only simulcast two of them in favor of exclusively airing the Monday Night Football game. This marked the first time since 2016 that ABC televised fewer than three NBA Christmas games.

Four Martin Luther King Jr. Day games were televised nationally, with TNT and NBA TV airing two apiece.

For the second consecutive season, the league held NBA Rivals Week from January 23 to 27, 2024, with each nationally televised game featuring "classic and budding rivalries between teams and players".

On the final day of the regular season, Sunday, April 14, two games with playoff implications were flexed into ESPN's afternoon doubleheader.

==== Streaming ====
TNT began streaming its games on the Bleacher Report Sports Add-on of its streaming service Max.

NBA League Pass continued to offer out-of-market games, live access to NBA TV, and on-demand replays of every game.

=== Local ===
The Washington Wizards' broadcaster became Monumental Sports Network prior to the start of the season. In September 2022, Monumental Sports & Entertainment bought out NBCUniversal's ownership stake in what was then its regional network brand, NBC Sports Washington.

==== Diamond Sports Group bankruptcy ====
The 16 NBA teams who had deals with the Bally Sports regional sports networks may be affected by its operator Diamond Sports Group's March 14, 2023, decision to file for Chapter 11 bankruptcy. Diamond had initially sought to continue broadcasting regional games while it plans to separate from majority parent Sinclair Broadcast Group as part of the reorganization.

On April 20, 2023, the Phoenix Suns signed a five-year agreement with Gray Television to replace Bally Sports Arizona as their broadcaster. Most Suns games would then be carried on broadcast television by Gray's KTVK, KPHO-TV, or KPHE-LD in Phoenix (as well as Tucson sister station KOLD-DT5, a new Gray station in Flagstaff, KAZF, and a new Gray station in Yuma, KAZS, with the latter two launching before the season starts). The Suns also launched an over-the-top subscription service called "Suns Live", which is created by Kiswe. After the announcement, Diamond accused the team of breaching its contract and bankruptcy law, stating that the team was making an "improper effort" to "change their broadcasting partner without permitting Diamond to exercise our contractual rights." In response, Phoenix Suns CEO Josh Bartelstein stated that "Diamond's position is totally inaccurate. We are moving forward with this deal and could not be more excited about what it means for our fans and our future." On May 10, 2023, the bankruptcy judge voided the Suns contract with Gray, ruling that the Suns violated Bally Sports Arizona's contractual right of first refusal. He ordered the parties into arbitration. On July 14, 2023, the deal became official when Diamond declined to match Gray's contract offer, going forward with the intended plan of theirs, only removing KPHO-TV from the initial list that included KTVK and KPHE. With Bally Sports later losing airing rights to the Arizona Diamondbacks to the MLB itself and the NHL's Arizona Coyotes to Scripps Sports, Bally Sports Arizona ended up shutting down services on October 21, 2023.

On October 1, 2023, Diamond Sports missed a payment to the Orlando Magic. However, on November 6, 2023, Diamond Sports and the NBA reached a one-year agreement that resulted in the contracts for teams airing on Diamond expiring after the 2023–24 NBA season, but resulted in the Magic being paid in the process. Across the board, all NBA teams airing on Diamond Sports received a 16% reduction in the money they receive, but teams would now be able to exclusively sell 10 games of their choosing to local over-the-air stations. However, on January 17, 2024, Diamond Sports announced a restructuring agreement after receiving a $115 million investment from Amazon. The restructuring agreement superseded the prior agreement with the NBA, so rights for the NBA would no longer expire following the 2023–24 season.

The following teams reached agreements to sell games to over-the-air stations:

Team	Station(s)	Source(s)
Cavaliers (5 games)	WUAB (Cleveland); WXIX-TV/WXIX-DT3 (Cincinnati); WBNS-TV/WCMH-TV (Columbus); WBDT/WHIO-DT2 (Dayton); WTRF-DT2 (Steubenville/Wheeling); WYTV-DT2 (Youngstown); WPKD/WPNT (Pittsburgh)	
Pistons (5 games)	WMYD	
Bucks (10 games)	WDJT-TV (Milwaukee); WBAY-TV (Green Bay); WISC-TV (Madison); WEAU/WECX (La Crosse); WSAW-TV/WYOW (Wausau); WQAD-DT3 (Quad Cities)	
Hawks (10 games)	WPCH-TV; Peachtree Sports Network	
Thunder (8 games)	KSBI (Oklahoma City); KOTV-DT3 (Tulsa); KSWO-DT3 (Lawton); KSCW-DT (Wichita); KOAM-TV/KFJX/KFJX-DT3 (Joplin/Pittsburg)	
Mavericks (10 games)	WFAA (Dallas); KCEN-TV (Waco); KYTX (Tyler); KWES-TV (Midland/Odessa); KIDY (San Angelo); KXVA (Abilene); KLCW-TV (Lubbock) (5 games); KMYL-LD (Lubbock) (5 games); KXII 12.2 My TV (Sherman) (8 games); KXII Fox 12 (Sherman) (2 games); KGBT-TV (Harlingen); KCPN-LD (Amarillo); KJBO-LD (Wichita Falls); KSHV-TV (Texarkana/Shreveport)	
Pelicans (10 games)	WVUE-DT (New Orleans); WAFB (Baton Rouge); KSLA (Shreveport); KPLC (Lake Charles); KNOE-TV (Monroe); KALB-TV (Alexandria); WLOX (Billoxi); WLBT (Jackson); WDAM-TV (Laurel); WTOK-TV (Meridian); WALA-TV (Mobile); KADN-TV (Lafayette)	

==== AT&T SportsNet closure ====
In February 2023, Warner Bros. Discovery announced it was winding down its AT&T SportsNet regional sports network business, affecting the Houston Rockets and the Utah Jazz's broadcasters, AT&T SportsNet Southwest and AT&T SportsNet Rocky Mountain, respectively. The Portland Trail Blazers' deal with Root Sports Northwest is not affected because Warner Bros. Discovery only has minority control of that network.

On June 20, 2023, the Jazz reached an agreement with Sinclair Broadcast Group owned stations KJZZ-TV and KUTV to become its new television home. Jazz owner Ryan Smith launched a new in-house production division, SEG Media, to produce the telecasts. While all games would air on KJZZ, Sinclair retained the right to carry select telecasts on KUTV, and KUTV would maintain an "official station" relationship with the team, allowing more coverage of the Jazz and its players. The deal would also include a streaming service, which not involved KJZZ-TV. AT&T SportsNet Rocky Mountain later rebranded itself to just SportsNet Rocky Mountain before shutting down services on October 21, 2023.

The Houston Rockets and the MLB's Houston Astros took over ownership of AT&T SportsNet Southwest, rebranding it as Space City Home Network on October 3, 2023.

=== Personnel ===
As part of a wave of layoffs, ESPN released analysts Mark Jackson and Jeff Van Gundy, and replaced them with Doris Burke and Doc Rivers on the lead announce team with Mike Breen. Doc Rivers left ESPN after he became the Bucks head coach in January 2024.

Boston Celtics television announcer Mike Gorman announced his retirement effective after this season. For this season, Gorman only called home games, and Drew Carter called preseason and road games. Carter was also announced as Gorman's successor for next season.

The Brooklyn Nets added Noah Eagle, son of primary television announcer Ian Eagle, to the broadcast team calling select games. The younger Eagle called around 10 games in lieu of Ian and secondary announcer Ryan Ruocco.

== Notable occurrences ==
- On July 25, 2023, Jaylen Brown signed a five-year, $304 million contract extension with the Boston Celtics, the largest in league history.
- On September 13, 2023, the NBA Board of Governors approved a new Player Participation Policy to help prevent "load management", when teams rest more than one healthy star player on any given night. The policy also states that team must ensure star players are available to play on all nationally televised games and in-season tournament games, among other player participation rules.
- On October 25, 2023, Victor Wembanyama scored three three-pointers in his regular-season debut, the most by a Spurs rookie in a single game. He also put up the third-most points in a single quarter for a first overall pick in his debut in the last 25 years.
- On October 28, 2023, Jalen Duren became the second teenager to post at least 20 points, 15 rebounds and 5 assists in a game.
- On October 29, 2023, Klay Thompson passed Jamal Crawford for 10th place on the league's all-time three-pointers made list.
- On October 31, 2023, Kevin Durant passed Hakeem Olajuwon for 12th on the league's all-time scoring list.
- On November 1, 2023, LeBron James scored 35 points in the Los Angeles Lakers' 130–125 overtime victory against the Los Angeles Clippers. His performance marked his 81st 30-point game since turning 35 years old in December 2019, surpassing Karl Malone for the most 30-point games by any player since turning 35 in NBA history.
- On November 1, 2023, Stephen Curry became the first player in NBA history to score at least one three-pointer in 250 consecutive regular season games.
- On November 2, 2023, Victor Wembanyama became the third teenager in NBA history to put up at least 35 points, 10 rebounds and two blocks in a game.
- On November 6, 2023, Nikola Jokić passed LeBron James and Jason Kidd for the 4th place on the NBA all-time triple-double list.
- For the second consecutive season, the league did not schedule regular season games on Election Day in the United States, which fell on November 7.
- On November 9, 2023, the Los Angeles Lakers posted the worst point differential (−74) in the 1st quarter over an eight-game span in NBA history.
- On November 10, 2023, LeBron James (38 years, 315 days) became the youngest player to reach 5,000 turnovers.
- On November 14, 2023, the Los Angeles Lakers achieved the highest three-point percentage in a game with at least 35 three-point attempts.
- On November 14, 2023, an altercation occurred during a game between the Golden State Warriors and the Minnesota Timberwolves. As a result of the incident, Draymond Green was suspended for five games. Green was also fined for the same reason, alongside Klay Thompson, Rudy Gobert and Jaden McDaniels.
- On November 15, 2023, LeBron James passed Jason Kidd for 5th on the all-time triple-doubles list. He also passed Jason Terry for 8th in the career three-pointers made list. James also became the second-oldest player to record a triple-double, behind only Karl Malone.
- On November 18, 2023, Giannis Antetokounmpo became the youngest player in NBA history to record 16,000 points, 7,000 rebounds and 3,000 assists in a career.
- On November 19, 2023, LeBron James passed Clyde Drexler for the 8th place on the league's all-time steals made list.
- On November 21, 2023, Kevin Durant passed Elvin Hayes for the 11th place on the NBA's all-time scoring list.
- On November 21, 2023, LeBron James became the first player to reach 39,000 career points. He also passed Vince Carter for 7th on the league's all-time three-pointers made list.
- On November 26, 2023, Victor Wembanyama became the first rookie with at least 20 points, 10 rebounds, 6 steals and 4 blocks in a game. He had 22 points, 11 rebounds and 2 assists.
- On November 27, 2023, LeBron James passed Kareem Abdul-Jabbar to become the all-time leader in minutes played during the regular season and playoffs combined.
- On December 1, 2023, Kevin Durant passed Moses Malone for the 10th place in the all-time scoring list.
- On December 2, 2023, the Dallas Mavericks went on a 30–0 run in a game against the Oklahoma City Thunder, the longest in NBA history without allowing a basket in the play-by-play era.
- On December 2, 2023, Luka Dončić became the first player with at least 20 points, 15 rebounds, 16 assists, 2 blocks, 2 steals in a game. He posted 36 points and 18 assists vs the Oklahoma City Thunder.
- On December 5, 2023, LeBron James became the oldest player to record 30 points, 10 assists and 5 steals in a game.
- On December 6, 2023, Luka Dončić moved past Larry Bird for the 9th place in the all-time career triple-doubles list. He also posted 29 points, 10 rebounds and 10 assists in the first half, marking the first 25-point, first-half triple-double in league history.
- On December 8, 2023, Victor Wembanyama (19 years, 38 days) became the youngest player in NBA history to have at least 20 points and 20 rebounds in a game.
- On December 11, 2023, Luka Dončić (24 years, 287 days) became the youngest player to reach 1,000 three-point field goals.
- On December 13, 2023, Giannis Antetokounmpo scored 64 points without making a three-point field goal vs the Indiana Pacers. This marked the most points scored without making a three-point field goal since its introduction in 1979–80.
- On December 13, 2023, Draymond Green was suspended indefinitely for striking Jusuf Nurkić on the face in a Warriors–Suns game the previous day, which resulted in a type 2 flagrant foul that led to his ejection from the game.
- On December 14, 2023, Nikola Jokić had his 10th triple-double of the season, becoming the first player ever to have at least 10 triple-doubles in seven consecutive seasons.
- On December 15, 2023, Jalen Brunson tied the record for most three-point field goals made (9) in a game with no misses vs the Phoenix Suns
- On December 16, 2023, Duncan Robinson of the Miami Heat on his 305th NBA game, became the fastest NBA player to achieve 900 career made three-point shots, breaking the record previously shared by Luka Dončić and Buddy Hield of 324 games played, in a 118–116 victory against the Chicago Bulls.
- On December 17, 2023, Stephen Curry's NBA record streak of consecutive games with at least one three-point field goal made ended at 268 games after failing to make a three-pointer against the Portland Trail Blazers. Previously, Curry failed to make a three-pointer in game 5 of the 2022 NBA Finals.
- On December 17, 2023, Victor Wembanyama set the record for the most consecutive double-doubles by a teenager at 8 games, passing Dwight Howard.
- On December 19, 2023, Ja Morant set the record for most points (34) by player in return game after missing at least 25 straight games. He achieved this vs the New Orleans Pelicans.
- On December 23, 2023, LeBron James scored the most points (40) in a game in a 21st season or later vs the Oklahoma City Thunder
- On December 25, 2023, coach Erik Spoelstra of the Miami Heat improved to 9–0 on games played on Christmas Day, the best record in NBA on the holiday, achieving it on a 119–113 victory over the Philadelphia 76ers. Miami Heat also achieve the highest winning percentage among active teams at 0.857 (12–2 record) for games played on Christmas Day
- On December 25, 2023, Jaime Jaquez Jr. became the first NBA rookie to record a 30-point double-double (31 points and 10 rebounds) on Christmas Day after 38 years since Patrick Ewing in 1985. His 31-point night also tied Kyle Kuzma for the seventh-most points scored on Christmas by a rookie in NBA history. The only rookies to score more points on the holiday are Wilt Chamberlain (45), Walt Bellamy (35), LeBron James (34), Bill Cartwright (33), Ewing (32) and Oscar Robertson (32).
- On December 28, 2023, Nikola Jokić became the first player to record a triple-double without missing a field goal or free throw in two games. He made all 11 field goals and 3 free throws vs. the Memphis Grizzlies.
- On December 28, 2023, Victor Wembanyama became the first player with 30 points and 7 blocks in 30 minutes or less. He played for 24:27 (min/sec) vs the Portland Trail Blazers. He also posted 6 rebounds and 6 assists. He is the only teenager with at least 30 points, 5 rebounds, 5 assists and 5 blocks in a game.
- On December 28, 2023, the Detroit Pistons tied the record for the longest losing streak in NBA history with 28, matching the record set by the Philadelphia 76ers over the 2014–15 and 2015–16 seasons.
- On December 30, 2023, Anthony Davis became the first player with at least 32 points, 17 rebounds, 7 assists, 4 steals and 2 blocks in a game. He had 33 points and 8 assists vs. the Minnesota Timberwolves.
- On December 30, 2023, Tyrese Haliburton became the third player to have at least 20 points and 20 assists in back-to-back games.
- On January 1, 2024, Jordan Clarkson became the first Utah Jazz player to record a triple-double in 15 years since Carlos Boozer achieved it on February 13, 2008. Clarkson recorded 20 points, 11 assists and 10 rebounds for the first time in his career, in a 127–90 win over the Dallas Mavericks.
- On January 9, 2024, coach Erik Spoelstra agreed to an eight-year, $120 million contract extension, the most committed money in both NBA and North American coaching history.
- On January 10, 2024, Victor Wembanyama became the youngest center in NBA history to record a triple-double and the youngest player without any turnovers (at 20 years and 6 days), passing Andre Iguodala, who achieved it at 21 years old in 2005. He recorded his career triple-double with 16 points, 12 rebounds and 10 assists in 21 minutes of action, making him the second player in NBA history to record it in less than 22 minutes, just 1 minute shy of Russell Westbrook, who did it in 20 minutes' play in 2014. Wembanyama, however, did it in a winning effort, 130–108 against the Detroit Pistons.
- On January 14, 2024, Damian Lillard of the Milwaukee Bucks scored the game-winning three-pointer in a 143–142 overtime win over the Sacramento Kings. By making this shot, he became the fifth player in NBA history to reach 2,500 career three-pointers.
- On January 17, 2024, Golden State Warriors assistant coach Dejan Milojević died as a result of a heart attack suffered the previous night while at a team dinner.
- On January 22, 2024, Joel Embiid of the Philadelphia 76ers scored 70 points, 18 rebounds and five assists in a 133–123 win over the San Antonio Spurs. By reaching this mark, he became the ninth player in NBA history to score 70 or more points in a game, as well as the first player in NBA history to register at least 70 points, 15 rebounds and five assists in a game.
- On that same night of January 22, 2024, Karl-Anthony Towns of the Minnesota Timberwolves scored a career-high 62 points, in a 128–125 loss to the Charlotte Hornets. It was the fourth time in NBA history that two different players scored at least 60 points on the same night, and the third time that it specifically had one player score at least 70 and another player score at least 60.
- On January 25, 2024, LeBron James was selected to his 20th NBA All-Star Game, breaking the record he held along with Kareem Abdul-Jabbar.
- On January 26, 2024, Luka Dončić scored 73 points in a game against the Atlanta Hawks, the most points scored in a single game since Kobe Bryant's 81-point performance in 2006.
- Also on January 26, 2024, Devin Booker of the Phoenix Suns scored 62 points (with 29 points scored in the first quarter alone) in a 133–131 loss to the Indiana Pacers. By extension, it was the fifth time in NBA history (and the second time in a week) that two different players scored at least 60 points on the same night, and the fourth time that it specifically had one player score at least 70 and another player score at least 60.
- On February 2, 2024, Russell Westbrook became the 25th player to score 25,000 points, and also joined LeBron James as the only players with 25,000 points, 9,000 assists and 8,000 rebounds.
- On February 8, 2024, the NBA announced that the In-Season Tournament will be renamed the NBA Cup, after the name of its trophy.
- On February 14, 2024, Stephen Curry became the first player to make seven or more three-pointers in four consecutive games.
- On February 25, 2024, Kevin Durant moved past Carmelo Anthony for 9th place on the all-time scoring list.
- On March 2, 2024, LeBron James became the first player in NBA history to score 40,000 points.
- On March 3, 2024, the Boston Celtics became the first team in NBA history to have three 50-point wins in one season, with a 140–88 victory over the Golden State Warriors.
- Also on March 3, 2024, Jusuf Nurkić of the Phoenix Suns tied a 21st-century NBA record (that was held by Kevin Love in 2010) for most rebounds grabbed in a single game with 31 boards in a 118–110 loss to the Oklahoma City Thunder.
- On March 10, 2024, Anthony Davis became the first player in NBA history to record 25-plus points, 25-plus rebounds, 5-plus assists and 5-plus steals in a single game, with 27 points, 25 rebounds, 7 steals and 5 assists against the Minnesota Timberwolves.
- On March 11, 2024, Daniel Gafford of the Dallas Mavericks set the NBA record for most consecutive made field goals in a row (dating as far back as the 1996–97 NBA season when play-by-play data first started being tracked) with 28 straight made field goals as of that day, with Gafford nearing a record set by Wilt Chamberlain unofficially back in 1967. Gafford later added five more made baskets to extend his record to 33 made baskets in a row, but fell short of Chamberlain's unofficial record by two following a missed basket early during their March 14 loss to the Oklahoma City Thunder.
- On March 17, 2024, Duncan Robinson became the fastest player in NBA history to reach 1,000 3-pointers on his 343rd game, surpassing Buddy Hield's record of 350 games.
- On March 20, 2024, Kevin Durant moved past Shaquille O'Neal for eighth place on the all-time scoring list.
- On April 1, 2024, Devin Booker tied a record set by Wilt Chamberlain during the 1961–62 season by being the only players to record three consecutive games of scoring more than 50 points against a single opponent.
- On April 14, 2024, for the first time in NBA history the top three teams of a conference (the Thunder, Nuggets and Timberwolves of the Western Conference) went into the final game of the season with an identical record (all were on 56–25).

== Attendances ==
The average attendance was 18,324. The 2023–24 NBA teams by average home attendance:

#	NBA team	Total attendance	Home games	Average attendance
1	Chicago Bulls	845,620	41	20,624
2	Dallas Mavericks	828,897	41	20,217
3	Philadelphia 76ers	821,714	41	20,041
4	Miami Heat	809,743	41	19,749
5	New York Knicks	808,885	41	19,728
6	Denver Nuggets	807,062	41	19,684
7	Toronto Raptors	800,129	41	19,515
8	Cleveland Cavaliers	793,167	41	19,345
9	Boston Celtics	785,396	41	19,156
10	Los Angeles Clippers	776,782	41	18,945
11	Los Angeles Lakers	793,945	41	18,903
12	Orlando Magic	773,939	41	18,876
13	Portland Trail Blazers	751,395	41	18,326
14	Utah Jazz	746,446	41	18,206
15	Detroit Pistons	726,378	41	18,159
16	San Antonio Spurs	742,522	41	18,110
17	Golden State Warriors	740,624	41	18,064
18	Minnesota Timberwolves	738,984	41	18,024
19	Sacramento Kings	735,015	41	17,927
20	Milwaukee Bucks	740,885	41	17,640
21	Brooklyn Nets	720,291	41	17,568
22	Houston Rockets	720,045	41	17,562
23	Oklahoma City Thunder	715,509	41	17,451
24	New Orleans Pelicans	692,054	41	17,301
25	Phoenix Suns	699,911	41	17,071
26	Atlanta Hawks	696,418	41	16,985
27	Washington Wizards	692,851	41	16,898
28	Memphis Grizzlies	681,875	41	16,631
29	Indiana Pacers	677,554	41	16,525
30	Charlotte Hornets	674,400	41	16,448

== See also ==
- List of NBA regular season records
