= Fred G. Hughes (newspaper publisher) =

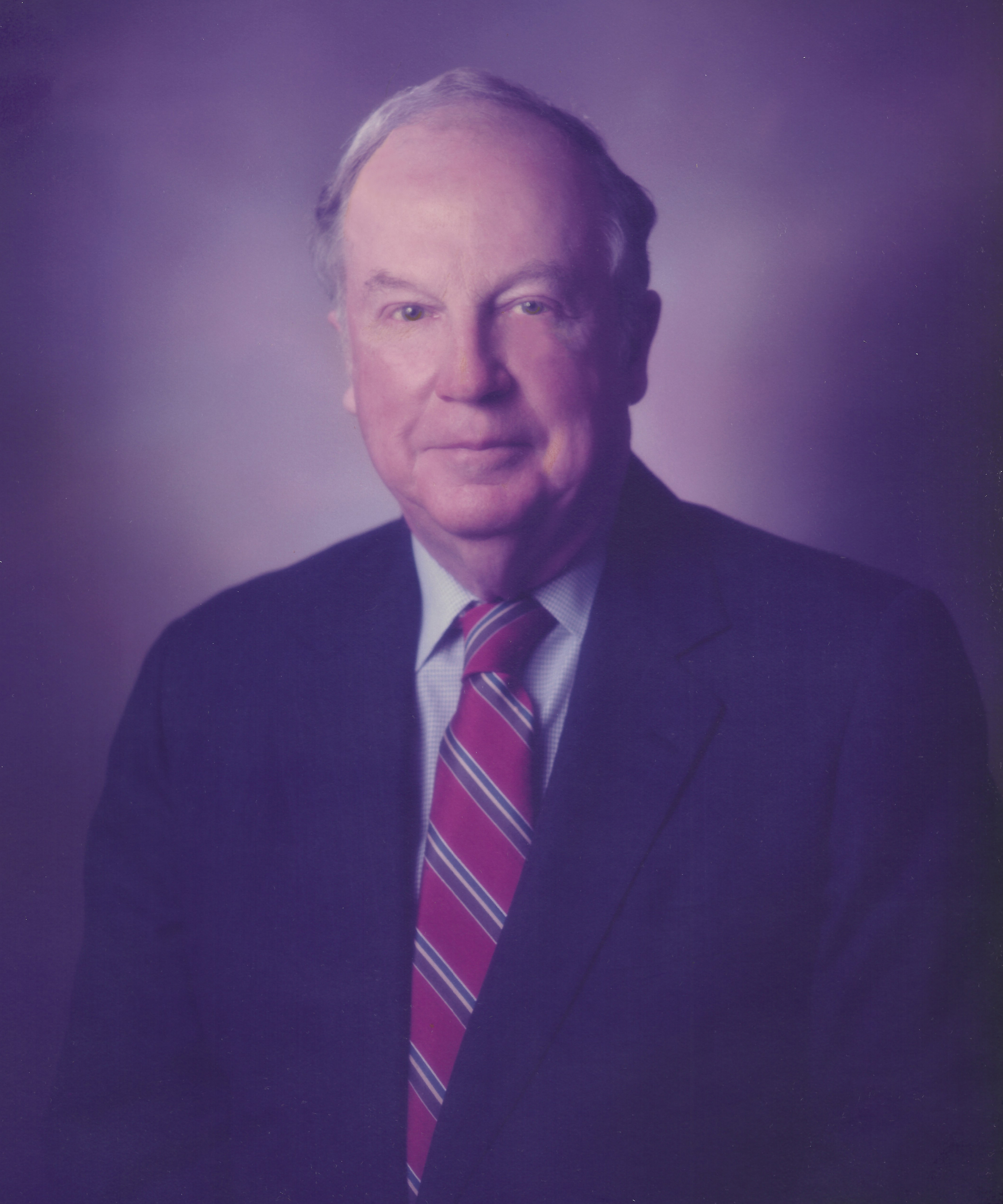
- Born: August 16, 1915
- Died: October 7, 1996 (aged 81); Joplin, Missouri, United States
- Monuments: Fred G. Hughes Stadium at Missouri Southern State University
- Education: Juris Doctor University of Missouri School of Law
- Alma mater: University of Missouri
- Occupations: FBI agent · president and chairman of the board of The Joplin Globe newspaper · philanthropist
- Board member of: Board of Regents Missouri Southern State University (1965-1981), Board of Trustees Missouri Southern State University (1964-1986)
- Spouse(s): Rebekah Harris Blair (m. 1942 - 1996, his death)
- Children: Sarah Elizabeth Hughes, Mary Janes Hughes

Fred G. Hughes (August 16, 1915 – October 7, 1996) was an American FBI agent, president and chairman of the board of The Joplin Globe, philanthropist, and one of the founders of Missouri Southern State University. He was a resident of Joplin, Missouri and was married to the former Rebekah Harris Blair.

== Early life ==
Hughes was raised in Grand Rapids, Michigan and graduated in 1939 with A.B and J.D. degrees from the University of Missouri. He was a member of the Phi Delta Theta fraternity and was selected as one of the Mystical Seven, a senior men's honorary.

In 1942, he married Rebekah Harris Blair and had two daughters, Sarah Elizabeth Hughes and Mary Jane Hughes.

== FBI Agent ==
Hughes practiced law in Joplin for a short period prior to World War II. During the war, he served for five years with the Federal Bureau of Investigation at offices in Washington, D.C., Baltimore, Maryland, and Milwaukee, Wisconsin. At the time of his resignation from the bureau in 1946, he was the senior agent in Green Bay, Wisconsin.

== The Joplin Globe ==
Returning to Joplin, Missouri, following his service in the FBI, he became associated with The Joplin Globe newspaper. Over a forty-year period, Hughes served in various management positions at the paper. At the time of his retirement in 1985, he was president and chairman of the board.

Hughes guided the paper through the period when newspaper production advanced from stereotyping and the hot metal process to the use of computers and photocomposition. He was a member of the board and served as president of the Inland Daily Press Association in Chicago, Illinois.

In 1976, Hughes entered into negotiations with James H. Ottoway Sr. of Campbell Hall, New York, which resulted in the sale of The Joplin Globe in November of that year to Ottoway Newspapers, Inc., a division of Dow Jones & Company.

== KOAM-TV ==
Hughes was a member of the board and secretary-treasurer of Mid-Continent Telecasting, Inc., which founded the television station KOAM-TV, the first television station in the Joplin, Missouri / Pittsburg, Kansas market. At the time of the sale of the Globe, Hughes and H. Lang Rogers purchased the Globe's interest in the station.

== WMBH-AM ==
Hughes and Clay Cowgill Blair Sr. owned and operated WMBH (1560 AM) with the Joplin Globe Publishing Company. WMBH was a pioneer radio station in the Southwest Missouri market.

== Community ==
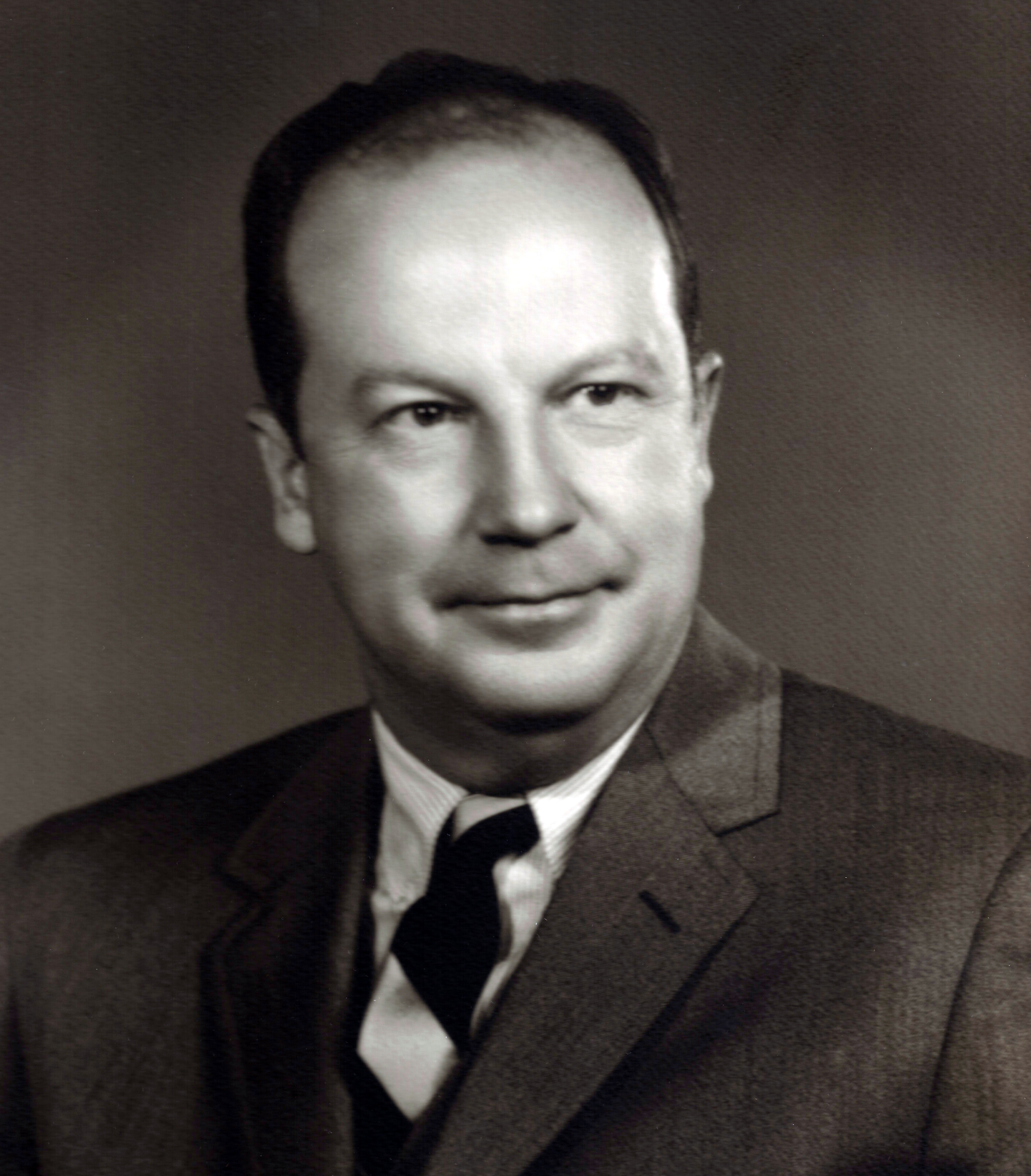
Fred G. Hughes The Joplin Globe President and Chairman

In Joplin, Hughes was president of the Rotary Club, the YMCA, and the Chamber of Commerce. In 1980, he was honored as the Outstanding Citizen of the Year by the Chamber. At the state level, he was president of the Missouri Good Roads Association, the Missouri Expenditures Survey, a member of the board of the Missouri Chamber of Commerce and vice-chairman of the Missouri State Reorganization Committee (Little Hoover Commission).

Hughes was a board member of the First National Bank and Trust Company.

He was a member of the board of the Mizzou Alumni Association and chairman of the publications committee which supervised the publication of the Mizzou Alumni magazine. He held memberships in the university's Jefferson Club and Law Society. In 1984, he was named a recipient of the Faculty-Alumni Award by the Missouri Alumni Association.

== Missouri Southern State University and Fred G. Hughes Stadium ==
One of Mr. Hughes’ primary interests was the foundation of Missouri Southern State University, then named Missouri Southern State College. Hughes and Dr. Leon Billingsly worked with Missouri Governor Warren E. Hearnes (a Democrat) and a small group of Joplin business leaders (mostly Republicans) which, early on, advocated and worked to establish a four-year college in the Joplin area. Hughes served as the inaugural chairman of the Missouri Southern board of regents from 1964 to 1981 as well as the board of trustees from 1964 to 1986.

Dr. Billingsly, the first president at Missouri Southern State College, and the board of regents and trustees honored Hughes by naming the football facility after him. The first game at Fred G. Hughes Stadium was played on September 6, 1975, and the Missouri Southern Lions defeated Emporia State 20–13. The facility was formally dedicated two weeks later on September 20, 1975, and the Southern Lions were again victorious, beating the University of Missouri-Rolla 26–6.

The Fred Hughes Collection at the George A. Spiva Library documents the history of Missouri Southern State University between 1964 and 1983. In addition to his papers, Mr. Hughes donated his personal library which included many books related to the American Civil War.

== Philanthropy ==
The Fred G. and Rebekah B. Hughes community trusts continue to support higher education at Missouri Southern State University, the University of Missouri School of Journalism, the Joplin Public Library and other Joplin non-profit organizations.
