= KWXD =

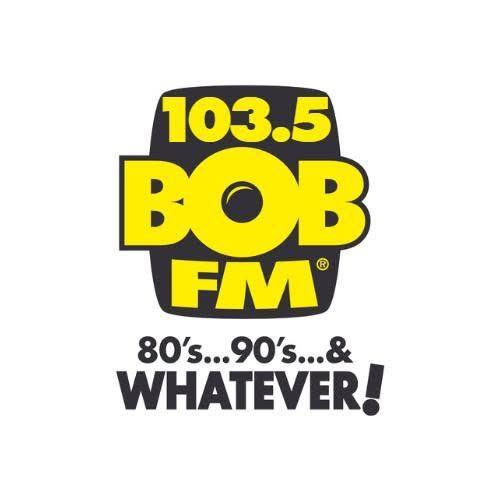
- Asbury, Missouri; United States
- Broadcast area: Pittsburg-Joplin, Missouri; Carthage, Missouri
- Frequency: 103.5 MHz
- Branding: 103.5 Bob-FM

Programming
- Format: Adult hits
- Affiliations: Bob FM

Ownership
- Owner: MyTown Media, Inc.
- Sister stations: KSEK; KSHQ

History
- First air date: October 1993

Technical information
- Licensing authority: FCC
- Facility ID: 28689
- Class: C3
- ERP: 16,000 watts
- HAAT: 126 meters (413 ft)
- Transmitter coordinates: 37°23′44.0″N 94°40′42.0″W

Links
- Public license information: Public file; LMS
- Webcast: Listen live
- Website: mytown-media.com/stations/103-5-bob-fm/

KWXD (103.5 FM) is an adult hits formatted radio station licensed to Asbury, Missouri, serving Pittsburg in Kansas and Joplin and Carthage in Missouri. KWXD is owned and operated by MyTown Media, Inc.

On May 26, 2023, KWXD changed its format from rock (as "RadioX 103.5") to adult hits, branded as "103.5 Bob-FM".
