= KBTN-FM =

Radio station in Neosho, Missouri, United States

- Neosho, Missouri; United States
- Broadcast area: Joplin, Missouri metropolitan area
- Frequency: 99.7 MHz
- Branding: 99.7 The Bull

Programming
- Format: Classic Country

Ownership
- Owner: American Media Investments
- Sister stations: KBTN, KSEK-FM

Technical information
- Licensing authority: FCC
- Facility ID: 33688
- Class: C3
- ERP: 16,500 watts
- HAAT: 123.0 meters
- Transmitter coordinates: 36°54′33.00″N 94°27′40.00″W

Links
- Public license information: Public file; LMS
- Website: www.kbtn997.com

KBTN-FM (99.7 FM) is a radio station broadcasting a classic country format. Licensed to Neosho, Missouri, United States, the station serves the Joplin area. The station is currently owned by Ffd Holdings I, Inc.
