= Fred G. Hughes Stadium =

Football stadium in Joplin, Missouri

Coordinates: 37.094938°N 94.457075°W

- Interactive map of Fred G. Hughes Stadium
- Location: Joplin, Missouri
- Owner: Missouri Southern State University
- Operator: Missouri Southern State University
- Capacity: 7,000
- Surface: Sprinturf

Construction
- Opened: 1975
- Renovated: 2011
- Architects: Allgeier, Martin, and Associates

Tenant
- Missouri Southern Lions (NCAA) (1975-present)

Fred G. Hughes Stadium at the Robert W. Plaster Complex is located at 3950 Newman Road is a 7,000 seat football stadium for Missouri Southern State University in Joplin, Missouri

The stadium opened in 1975 and cost $1.7 million. It claims to be the first state college stadium in Missouri to use artificial turf. In 2003 its turf was replaced with Sprinturf. The previous turf in place in 1988 has been BaspoGrass-S.

Its capacity is 4,700 fans on the west side and 2,300 spectators on the east.

The stadium was named in honor of Fred G Hughes, president of the College Board of Regents between 1964 and 1978. It was designed by Joplin architect firm Allgeier, Martin, and Associates.

In February 2011, the Robert W. Plaster Foundation announced two seven figure gifts to the school to build baseball field and a multi-purpose athletic facility adjacent to the football field and to renovate Fred G. Hughes Stadium. The whole complex is to be named Robert W. Plaster Sports Complex (there is another complex of the same name at Missouri State University). After additional funding is raised for the Hughes renovations, that field is to be renamed Robert W. Plaster Stadium. School officials are debating renaming the entrance to the Hughes Entrance Plaza.

The field was used as the first temporary morgue on May 22, 2011 after the 2011 Joplin tornado destroyed much of the community.
