= KKOW (AM) =

Coordinates: 37°24′46″N 94°38′16″W

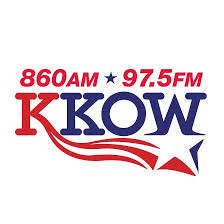
- Pittsburg, Kansas; United States
- Broadcast area: Southeast Kansas; Joplin, Missouri; Miami, Oklahoma
- Frequency: 860 kHz
- Branding: AM 860/97.5 KKOW

Programming
- Format: Farm–classic country
- Affiliations: Fox News Radio; Kansas City Chiefs

Ownership
- Owner: American Media Investments
- Sister stations: KKOW-FM; KSEK-FM

History
- First air date: October 11, 1937
- Former call signs: KOAM (1937–1981)

Technical information
- Licensing authority: FCC
- Facility ID: 1881
- Class: B
- Power: 10,000 watts (day); 5,000 watts (night)
- Translators: 97.5 K248DR (Joplin, Missouri)

Links
- Public license information: Public file; LMS
- Webcast: Listen live
- Website: www.kkowam.com

KKOW (860 AM) is a radio station in Pittsburg, Kansas. It broadcasts a farm–classic country format.

KKOW is the flagship station for Pittsburg State University football and basketball games. Those broadcasts also air on sister station KBZI.

Programming heard on KKOW includes Coast to Coast AM, America in the Morning, Orion Samuelson's National Farm Report, Mornings with Dalton, Trading Post, Agritalk with Mike Adams and The Sports Drive with Eddie Lomshek. Farm reports and classic country music are broadcast throughout the day.

Logo before translator sign on

== History ==
The station began on October 11, 1937, as KOAM, owned by E. Victor Baxter and Lester L. Cox on 790 kHz. It later moved to 810 kHz. It traded off 810 kHz with KCMO in Kansas City, Missouri (now on 710 kHz) for its current location on 860 kHz.

KOAM originally was an NBC affiliate, carrying programming from both the Red and Blue networks. Cox and Baxter also founded KOAM-TV in 1953, an NBC affiliate carrying secondary affiliations with CBS, ABC, and DuMont.

By the end of the 1970s, KOAM adopted a country music format.

It was sold to American Media Investments on May 11, 1981. Due to the ownership split of KOAM AM-FM from KOAM-TV, its callsign changed from KOAM to KKOW on May 18, 1981.

Bridging KOAM with KKOW, Dan Willis hosted the morning slot 6 days a week from 1964 to 2004, administering the Community Calendar (reading obituaries and local events), the morning polka (7:30 daily with birthday dedications, sponsored by Grimaldi's Cash Grain feedstore in Pittsburg), farm commodity reports, and "Trading Post", a live call-in show for individual buyers and sellers at 9:00). Willis also oversaw many of the live remote broadcasts and emceed events, and he promoted an annual drive to buy Christmas gifts for developmentally-disabled children that were patients in a local care facility.

At its peak in the mid-1980s, KKOW was known in the Pittsburg, Kansas/Joplin, Missouri-area for gimmicks such as 30/30 news and 20/20 weather, the daily Grand Lake fishing report with elderly Oklahoma fisherman/storyteller Lee Jeffries, the giant fiberglass cow on a trailer for remote broadcasts (Burford the Hereford), and the K-Cowboy of the Day. KKOW also covered the annual Little Balkan Days Celebration.

During the mid-1980s, the staff (in addition to Dan Willis) included disc jockeys Steve "Pazz" Passeri, Tim "Bones" Wallace, Vance Lewis, Jeff Freeman (Program Director), Gwen Freeman, Mike Gilmore, Randy Davis, Jeff Trout, and Carla Castle. The farm director was Hugh Robinson, and Rob Strand was the sports reporter.

The station was run by the Freeman family through the 1980s, with Bob Freeman (a prominent outdoor sports promoter) as the General Manager. Being a CBS affiliate, KKOW aired hourly live updates from CBS's New York bureau (typically done by Douglas Edwards during weekdays), "Reporter's Notebook" with Dan Rather weekday evenings, "The Osgood Files" with humorist Charles Osgood on weekday mornings, and other network programming. KKOW was among the first stations in the area to broadcast 24 hours a day in the early 1980s, a rarity in the market. Typical 1980s sponsors included area businesses such as Cash Grain, Heidrich TV & Appliance, Castagno's, Chicken Annie's, Jim's Steak House, Colaw RV, Bowlus Sporting Goods, Lindberg Pharmacy, and Pittsburg Ford-Lincoln-Mercury, and various funeral homes.

KKOW exercised a Top 40 country format in the 1980s, and heavily promoted popular acts such as the Judds that would come to Pittsburg's Memorial Auditorium to perform. AM radio stations of that era were expected to provide full-service programming as a community service, and programming unrelated to the country format aired in blocks on weekends. Prominent weekend programming included the third-party-produced "The Waxworks Show with Gary Hannes", a multi-hour big-band show on Sunday afternoons that appealed to KKOW's older audience; this aired through the 1980s. A bluegrass show followed "The Waxworks Show", and various syndicated shows aired on Sunday nights.

When KKOW-FM was founded in 1986, most of the younger DJs on the AM station shifted to the FM station (notably Tim "Bones" Wallace and Rob Strand "the Singing Newsman", who co-hosted the weekday morning shift) for handling its album-oriented rock format; from there, the staff dispersed by the late 1980s/early 1990s, with the Freemans' management eventually ending.

KKOW continued on with turnover of employees through the 1990s, but retained a similar contemporary country music format. Dan Willis remained on the morning show. Notable on-air talent included Tom Van Hoy (sports), Bob Capps (news), and Southeast Kansas agricultural extension agent Jake Weber ("Gardening with Jake", a Saturday morning call-in show co-hosted with Dan Willis). KKOW had over the years been modestly successful in Joplin, Missouri, but never dominated the market and remained (to an extent), a station more known for rural listenership geared more for the Pittsburg-Frontenac area of southeast Kansas. In the 1990s, KKOW was being eclipsed by other competing FM stations such as KIXQ in Joplin (KIX 94).

By the early 2000s, Pizza Hut entrepreneur Gene Bicknell owned American Media Investments along with KOAM-TV (reversing the 1981 split between KOAM TV and radio), and AMI acquired a number of radio stations in the Joplin-Pittsburg market with the newly relaxed ownership rules. Dan Willis retired due to a terminal illness in 2004, and he was succeeded by Dalton Windsor. The station's country music format ebbed in general, and conservative-leaning agribusiness programming was more prominent. An experiment at abandoning music altogether was attempted for approximately a year in favor of an all-talk format; this was abandoned, and a classic country (1950s-early 1990s) format was introduced in addition to the agribusiness programming and mainstays such as "Trading Post". In 2009, KKOW's newly hired general manager fired for stealing a reported sum of over $87,000 from the station to cover compulsive gambling, and was convicted of embezzlement.
