= Four-state area =

Area where the states of Arkansas, Kansas, Missouri, and Oklahoma almost touch

Coordinates: 36.800°N 94.700°W

The four-state area or quad-state area, also known as Southwest Missouri, and Northwest Arkansas is where the states of Arkansas, Kansas, Missouri, and Oklahoma almost touch: Arkansas and Kansas share no boundary. The metropolitan areas of Tulsa, Oklahoma; Springfield, Missouri, Joplin, Missouri; and Fayetteville–Springdale–Rogers, Arkansas are in the region. Notable cities and towns in the area are Tulsa and Miami, Oklahoma; Pittsburg, Kansas; Joplin, Springfield, and Monett, Missouri; and Fayetteville, Springdale, Rogers, and Bentonville, Arkansas.

The area is partially in the Ozarks. Oil and gas production and coal mining were and continue to be a large part of the region's industry. Today, a major driver of the region's economy is Walmart, the world's largest retail company, whose headquarters are in Bentonville. Also headquartered nearby in Northwest Arkansas are Tyson Foods, the world's largest processor of chicken, beef, and pork (Springdale); and major trucking and transportation company J. B. Hunt (Lowell). The major oil and energy companies ONEOK and Williams are located in Tulsa. The city of Joplin, Missouri is nearest to the center of the four-states area.

== Media ==
Outside of Tulsa (the largest city in the four-states area by far), the area has two primary television markets. The Joplin–Pittsburg market covers the region’s counties in Missouri; Ottawa County, Oklahoma (the only county in northeastern Oklahoma that is not designated as part of the Tulsa market); and most of those in southeastern Kansas (excluding Chautauqua and Montgomery counties, which are also in the Tulsa DMA). It is served by KOAM-TV (channel 7, CBS; the station’s call letters stand for Kansas, Oklahoma, Arkansas, and Missouri), KFJX (channel 14, Fox/CW+), KSNF (channel 16, NBC), KODE-TV (channel 12, ABC), and KOZJ (channel 26, PBS; part of the two-station Ozarks Public Television regional member network).

The media market of Fayetteville and Fort Smith covers the counties that are in northwest Arkansas. Stations include KNWA-TV (channel 51, NBC), KHBS/KHOG (40/29, ABC), KFSM (channel 5, CBS), and KAFT, one of the stations of the Arkansas PBS member network. The majority of the households in the market are served by stations in the Tulsa, Oklahoma metropolitan area, including KOTV (CBS), KTUL (ABC), KJRH-TV (NBC), and KOKI-TV (Fox).

== Education ==
There are several universities in the four states. Missouri State University, Ozarks Technical Community College, Drury, and Evangel are all located in Springfield, Missouri. Missouri Southern State University is located in Joplin. Pittsburg State University is located in Pittsburg. Coffeyville Community College is located in Coffeyville. Northeastern Oklahoma A&M College is located in Miami. The University of Tulsa and Oral Roberts University are located in Tulsa. The University of Arkansas is located in Fayetteville and John Brown University is located in Siloam Springs, Arkansas.

== Naming ==
Industries use the term to describe the region as a whole – businesses often name themselves Four State ______ to attempt to describe the area they wish to serve. Interstates 44, 49, 540 and US Highways 60, 62, 69, 71, 166, 169, 400, and 412 serve the area. The historic Route 66 also runs through the region.

== See also ==
- Tri-state area
- Four Corners
