= WMBH =

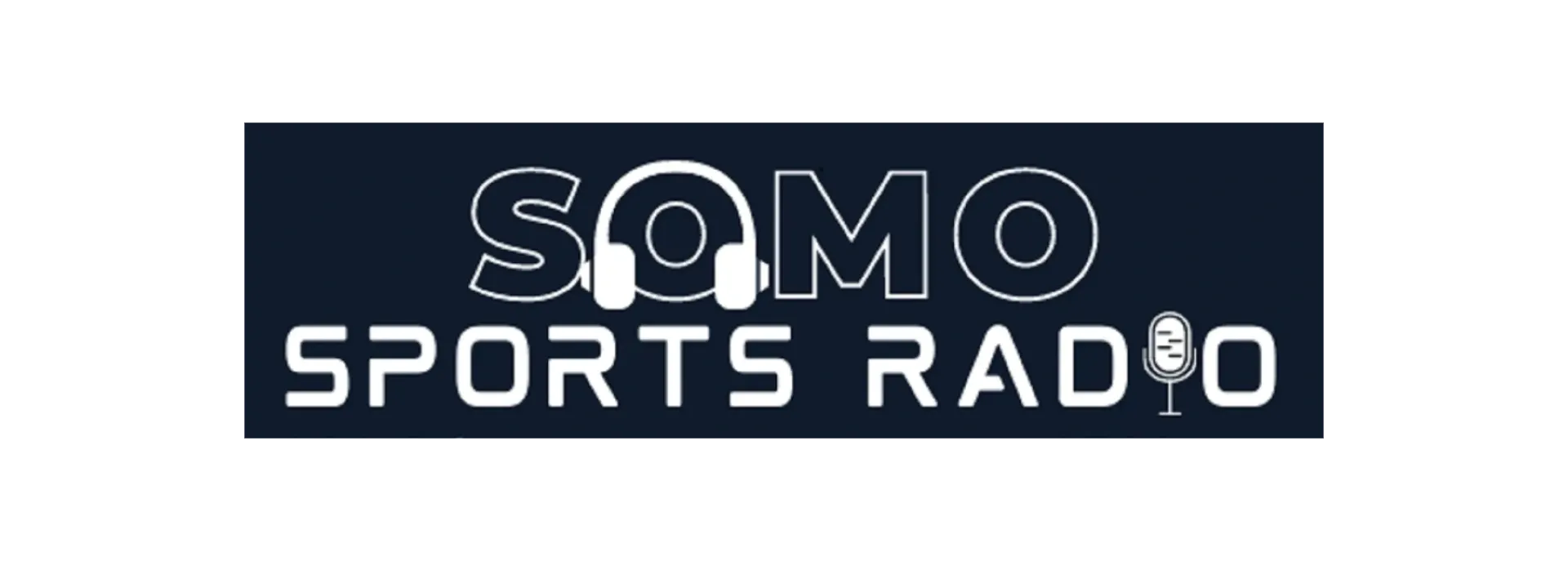
- Joplin, Missouri; United States
- Frequency: 1560 kHz
- Branding: Somo Sports Radio

Programming
- Format: Sports radio
- Affiliations: Infinity Sports Network; VSiN Radio

Ownership
- Owner: Michael Day Landis; (Land Go Radio Group LLC)
- Sister stations: KHST

History
- First air date: August 14, 1962; 63 years ago
- Former call signs: KQYX (1962–2001)
- Call sign meaning: "Where Memories Bring Happiness" (slogan first year of operation)

Technical information
- Licensing authority: FCC
- Facility ID: 72493
- Class: D
- Power: 500 watts (day); 35 watts (night)
- Transmitter coordinates: 37°05′21″N 94°33′46″W
- Translator: 101.3 K268CP (Joplin)

Links
- Public license information: Public file; LMS
- Webcast: Listen live
- Website: somosportsradio.com

WMBH (1560 AM, "Somo Sports Radio") is a radio station licensed to Joplin, Missouri. The station is a Infinity Sports Network affiliate, with some programming from the Vegas Stats & Information Network. Its programming is also carried by K268CP 101.3 FM, licensed to Joplin. The station used to share the site for KQYX (1450kHz). Now the station has sole use of the site on West Citation Lane.

== History ==
The station was first licensed, as KQYX, on August 14, 1962 to William B. Neal in Joplin. On July 25, 2001, the station engaged in a two-way call sign and format swap, with AM 1560 KQYX becoming WMBH and receiving a sports format, and AM 1450 WMBH becoming KQYX.

On October 9, 2006, WMBH flipped formats from talk/sports to urban contemporary as "1560 The Beat".

In January 2022, WMBH rebranded as "Somo Sports Radio" and switched affiliations from Fox Sports Radio to CBS Sports Radio.

== Previous logo ==
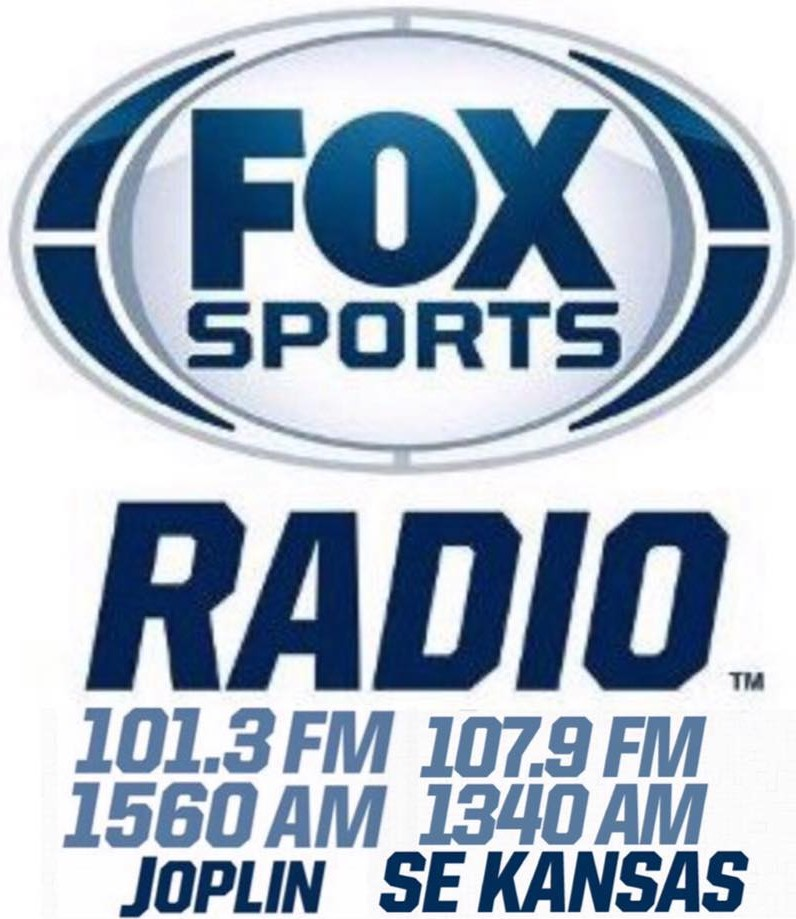
