= KBTN (AM) =

- Neosho, Missouri; United States
- Broadcast area: Joplin, Missouri
- Frequency: 1420 kHz
- Branding: Fox Sports 99.1 - 100.1 & 1420 AM

Programming
- Format: Sports
- Affiliations: Fox Sports Radio

Ownership
- Owner: American Media Investments
- Sister stations: KBTN-FM, KSEK-FM

History
- First air date: 1954
- Former call signs: KBTN (1954–2006); KQYS (2006–2008)

Technical information
- Licensing authority: FCC
- Facility ID: 33687
- Class: B
- Power: 1,000 watts day 123 watts night
- Transmitter coordinates: 36°50′52.2″N 94°19′12.8″W
- Translators: K261ET (100.1 MHz, Neosho)

Links
- Public license information: Public file; LMS
- Webcast: Listen Live
- Website: Official Website

KBTN (1420 AM) is a radio station broadcasting a sports talk format. Licensed to Neosho, Missouri, United States, the station serves the Neosho, Missouri, area. The station is currently owned by American Media Investments, and features programming from Fox Sports Radio.

== History ==
From its inception until the introduction of KBTN-FM, KBTN (AM) was a community-minded, low-power station that broadcast local news, local sports, and in-house produced programming. From the 1950s to the 1990s, the station broadcast on a dawn-to-dusk schedule at a power of 500 watts. A well-remembered announcer, "Herkimer P. Pushbroom" (Joe Johnson), greeted early morning risers for years, along with his fictional sidekick, "Homer" the rooster. David Winegardner owned and managed the station from 1974 through the years 2000. KBTN played a major role in the emergency notifications during the tornado of 1975, saving many lives.

=== Expanded Band assignment ===
On March 17, 1997 the Federal Communications Commission (FCC) announced that eighty-eight stations had been given permission to move to newly available "Expanded Band" transmitting frequencies, ranging from 1610 to 1700 kHz, with KBTN authorized to move from 1420 to 1670 kHz. However, the station never procured the Construction Permit needed to implement the authorization, so the expanded band station was never built.

=== Later history ===
The station was once affiliated with both Citadel Media and CNN Radio. Station call letters were changed to KQYS on March 16, 2006, but changed back to KBTN on May 28, 2008.

On January 31, 2022, the station fliped its format from classic rock to sports.
