= KSEK (AM) =

Coordinates: 37°23′44″N 94°40′42″W

- Pittsburg, Kansas; United States
- Frequency: 1340 kHz
- Branding: The Dawg 1340/107.9

Programming
- Format: Classic Rock

Ownership
- Owner: William Wachter; (My Town Media Inc)
- Sister stations: KSHQ, KWXD

History
- First air date: July 11, 1947
- Former call signs: KSEK (1947–1984); KNZS (1984–1986); KSEK (1986–1993); KPHN (1993–1997); KNHN (3/1997–8/1997)
- Call sign meaning: SouthEast Kansas

Technical information
- Licensing authority: FCC
- Facility ID: 33698
- Class: C
- Power: 1,000 watts unlimited
- Translator: 107.9 K300DE (Pittsburg)

Links
- Public license information: Public file; LMS
- Webcast: Listen live
- Website: www.rockofkansas.com

KSEK (1340 kHz, "The Dawg 1340/107.9") is an AM radio station licensed to Pittsburg, Kansas.

== History ==
On December 19, 1946, the Pittsburg Publishing Company—a subsidiary of Stauffer Communications that owned the city's two newspapers, the Pittsburg Sun (morning) and Pittsburg Daily Headlight (evening)—was granted a construction permit from the Federal Communications Commission to build a new 250-watt radio station on 1340 kHz in the city. The station began broadcasting on July 11, 1947. from studios inside the Hotel Besse on East 4th Street.

KSEK changed over from an informational talk format to Fox Sports Radio on or around August 19, 2013.

Prior to its previous sports format, the station aired formats such as news/talk, adult standards, adult contemporary and classic country.

In January 2022, KSEK rebranded as "Sports Radio 107.9" and switched affiliations from Fox Sports Radio to CBS Sports Radio.

On October 21, 2022, KSEK changed their format from sports to country, branded as "My Country 107.9".

In March 2026, MyTown Media Announced that they Will Be rebranding some stations to “The Rock Of Kansas”.

In August 2026, Murfin Media rebranded as "The Dawg" due to a cease and desist from Audacy, Inc. for trademark infringement over the "Rock of Kansas" slogan (which it owns in connection to KQRC-FM).

== Previous logos ==
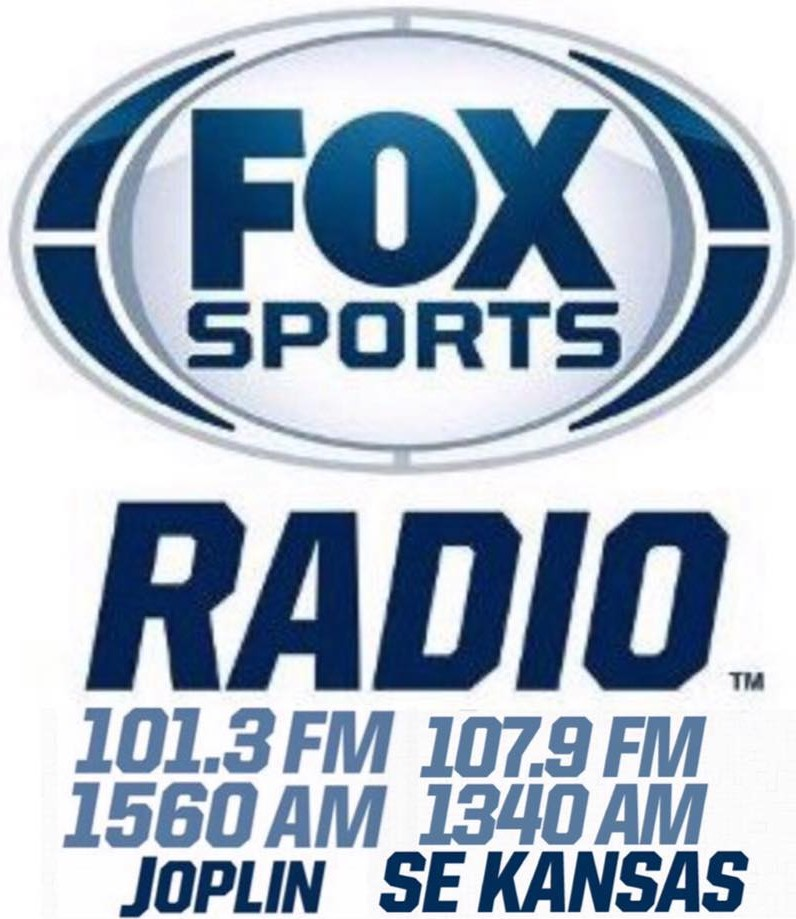
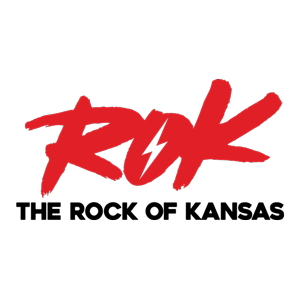
