= KSHQ =

- Deerfield, Missouri; United States
- Broadcast area: Pittsburg, Kansas; Nevada, Missouri; Fort Scott, Kansas
- Frequency: 100.7 MHz
- Branding: ESPN 100.7

Programming
- Format: Sports
- Affiliations: ESPN Radio

Ownership
- Owner: Nancy Miller; (One Media, Inc.)

History
- First air date: 2013

Technical information
- Licensing authority: FCC
- Facility ID: 190419
- Class: C3
- ERP: 17,700 watts
- HAAT: 119 meters (390 ft)
- Transmitter coordinates: 37°43′07″N 94°40′07″W

Links
- Public license information: Public file; LMS
- Webcast: Listen live
- Website: espn1007.com

KSHQ (100.7 FM, "ESPN 100.7") is a radio station licensed to Deerfield, Missouri. The station broadcasts a sports format and is owned by Nancy Miller, through licensee One Media, Inc. The station is also simulcast on WMBH 1560 AM to reach the Joplin market better.

== Origin ==
KBZI (100.7 FM) was a radio station broadcasting a hot adult contemporary format. The station was owned by American Media Investments, and was branded as B100.7 until May 2008.

In February 2009, KBZI was set to make a move to 107.1 FM so that its signal would better serve the southern part of the Pittsburg market and the nearby Joplin, Missouri market. However, this severely weakened its signal in the northern part of the market, 100.7's primary coverage area, making it more difficult to pick it up in Fort Scott and Nevada, where it had a significant following. The switch was delayed due to high winds, which prevented workers from installing the transmitter on its new tower, which kept the station off the air for three days.

A few days later, it was rumored that the 107.1 BZI experiment had already been killed and the 107.1 frequency was restored to the format it had been carrying before the switch.

The 100.7 frequency went dark after that, and later was vacated. The license was purchased Patrick Parker and MyTown Media, LCC, took over operations. After simulcasting sister station My Country 101.7 (KHST) for a period between April 1-June 30, 2013, it signed on as ESPN 100.7, The Sports Headquarters.

KSHQ and four co-owned construction permits were sold to One Media, Inc. for $120,000; the sale closed on January 30, 2015.
