= KHST =

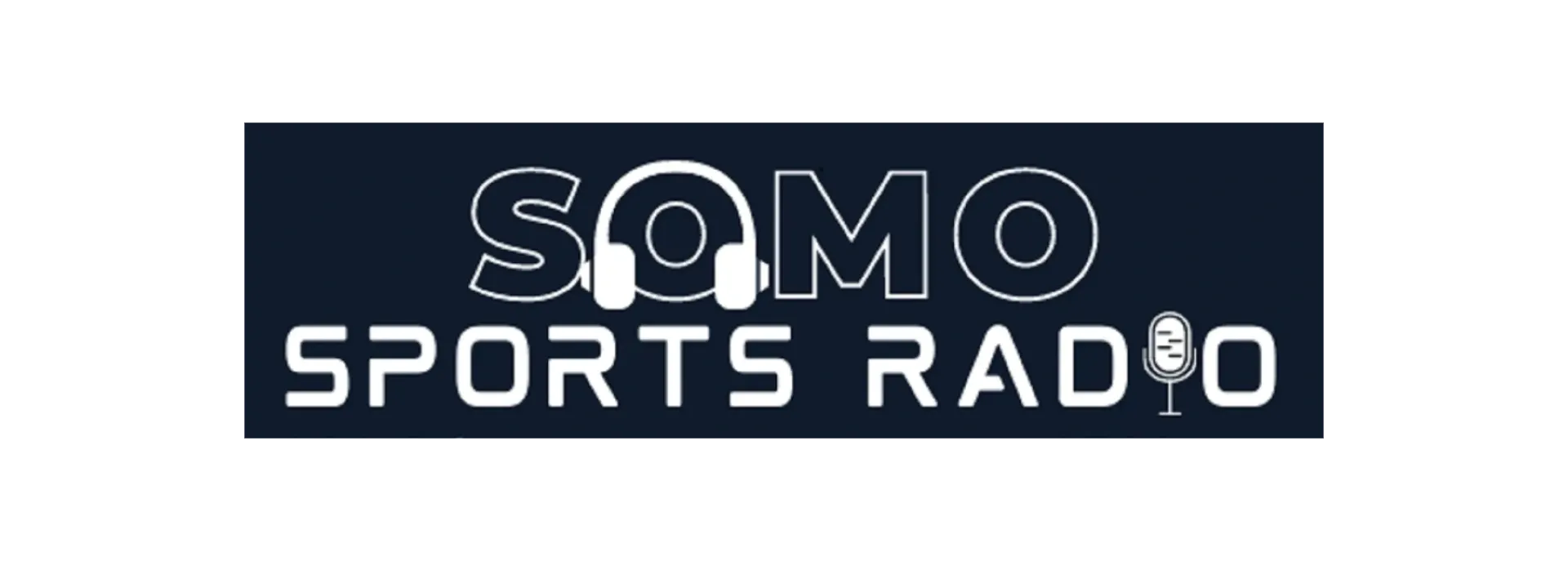
- Lamar, Missouri; United States
- Broadcast area: Joplin, Missouri
- Frequency: 101.7 MHz
- Branding: Somo Sports Radio 101.7

Programming
- Format: Sports Radio
- Affiliations: Arkansas Razorbacks; Kansas City Chiefs; Kansas City Royals; Missouri Southern Lions

Ownership
- Owner: Michael D Landis; (Land Go Radio Group LLC)
- Sister stations: WMBH

History
- First air date: May 1, 1992; 34 years ago

Technical information
- Licensing authority: FCC
- Facility ID: 34541
- Class: C3
- ERP: 22,000 watts
- HAAT: 100 meters
- Transmitter coordinates: 37°25′27.00″N 94°16′11.00″W

Links
- Public license information: Public file; LMS
- Webcast: Listen live
- Website: 1017thevault.com

KHST (101.7 FM) is a radio station broadcasting an Sports Radio format. KHST began airing a country music format on March 1, 2011, after having been a classic hits station for several years and an adult contemporary station in the 1990s. Licensed to Lamar, Missouri, United States, the station serves the Joplin area. The station's studios are in Pittsburg, Kansas. KHST is currently owned by Michael D Landis, through licensee Land Go Radio Group LLC.

On June 2, 2022, KHST changed its format from country as "My Country 101.7" to oldies.
