= Asbury, Missouri =

- City
- Location of Asbury, Missouri
- Coordinates: 37°16′23″N 94°36′19″W
- Country: United States
- State: Missouri
- County: Jasper

Area
  - Total: 0.37 sq mi (0.95 km^{2})
  - Land: 0.37 sq mi (0.95 km^{2})
  - Water: 0 sq mi (0.00 km^{2})
- Elevation: 896 ft (273 m)

Population (2020)
  - Total: 193
  - Density: 528.9/sq mi (204.21/km^{2})
- Time zone: UTC-6 (Central (CST))
  - Summer (DST): UTC-5 (CDT)
- ZIP code: 64832
- Area code: 417
- FIPS code: 29-02098
- GNIS feature ID: 2393995

Asbury is a city in Jasper County, Missouri, United States. The population was 193 at the 2020 census. It is part of the Joplin, Missouri Metropolitan Statistical Area.

== History ==
Asbury was platted in 1896. A post office called Asbury has been in operation since 1894.

== Geography ==
According to the United States Census Bureau, the city has a total area of 0.37 square miles (0.96 km^{2}), all land.

== Demographics ==
Historical population
Census	Pop.	Note	%±
1920	226		—
1930	264		16.8%
1940	252		−4.5%
1950	210		−16.7%
1960	186		−11.4%
1970	201		8.1%
1980	210		4.5%
1990	220		4.8%
2000	218		−0.9%
2010	207		−5.0%
2020	193		−6.8%
U.S. Decennial Census

=== 2010 census ===
As of the census of 2010, there were 207 people, 86 households, and 61 families living in the city. The population density was 559.5 inhabitants per square mile (216.0 inhabitants/km^{2}). There were 103 housing units at an average density of 278.4 units per square mile (107.5 units/km^{2}). The racial makeup of the city was 96.1% White, 1.4% Native American, 1.0% Pacific Islander, 0.5% from other races, and 1.0% from two or more races. Hispanic or Latino of any race were 1.4% of the population.

There were 86 households, of which 31.4% had children under the age of 18 living with them, 54.7% were married couples living together, 14.0% had a female householder with no husband present, 2.3% had a male householder with no wife present, and 29.1% were non-families. 19.8% of all households were made up of individuals, and 5.8% had someone living alone who was 65 years of age or older. The average household size was 2.41 and the average family size was 2.69.

The median age in the city was 41.8 years. 20.3% of residents were under the age of 18; 10.1% were between the ages of 18 and 24; 25.5% were from 25 to 44; 31.9% were from 45 to 64; and 12.1% were 65 years of age or older. The gender makeup of the city was 53.6% male and 46.4% female.

=== 2000 census ===
As of the census of 2000, there were 218 people, 85 households, and 61 families living in the city. The population density was 618.4 inhabitants per square mile (238.8 inhabitants/km^{2}). There were 98 housing units at an average density of 278.0 units per square mile (107.3 units/km^{2}). The racial makeup of the city was 97.25% White, 0.00% Black, 0.46% Native American, 0.46% Asian, and 1.83% from two or more races. Hispanic or Latino of any race were 1.38% of the population.

There were 85 households, out of which 34.1% had children under the age of 18 living with them, 61.2% were married couples living together, 4.7% had a female householder with no husband present, and 28.2% were non-families. 23.5% of all households were made up of individuals, and 5.9% had someone living alone who was 65 years of age or older. The average household size was 2.56 and the average family size was 3.05.

In the city the population was spread out, with 25.7% under the age of 18, 11.0% from 18 to 24, 33.5% from 25 to 44, 21.1% from 45 to 64, and 8.7% who were 65 years of age or older. The median age was 34 years. For every 100 females, there were 118.0 males. For every 100 females age 18 and over, there were 121.9 males.

The median income for a household in the city was $28,125, and the median income for a family was $35,417. Males had a median income of $24,875 versus $20,625 for females. The per capita income for the city was $15,205. About 4.8% of families and 10.0% of the population were below the poverty line, including 14.6% of those under the age of eighteen and none of those 65 or over.

== Education ==
The school district is Carl Junction R-I School District.
