= KFJX =

Television station in Pittsburg, Kansas

- Pittsburg, Kansas; Joplin, Missouri; United States
- City: Pittsburg, Kansas
- Channels: Digital: 13 (VHF); Virtual: 14
- Branding: Fox 14; 4-States CW (14.2)

Programming
- Affiliations: 14.1: Fox; 14.2: CW+; for others, see § Subchannels

Ownership
- Owner: SagamoreHill Broadcasting; (SagamoreHill of Missouri Licenses, LLC)
- Operator: Morgan Murphy Media via JSA/SSA
- Sister stations: KOAM-TV

History
- Founded: September 20, 1996
- First air date: October 18, 2003
- Former channel numbers: Analog: 14 (UHF, 2003–2009)
- Call sign meaning: "Kansas" and mix of "Fox" and "Joplin"

Technical information
- Licensing authority: FCC
- Facility ID: 83992
- ERP: 45.1 kW
- HAAT: 337 m (1,106 ft)
- Transmitter coordinates: 37°13′15″N 94°42′26″W
- Translator(s): KOAM-TV 7.2 Pittsburg, KS

Links
- Public license information: Public file; LMS
- Website: www.koamnewsnow.com

KFJX (channel 14) is a television station licensed to Pittsburg, Kansas, United States, serving the Joplin, Missouri–Pittsburg, Kansas market as an affiliate of Fox and The CW Plus. It is owned by SagamoreHill Broadcasting, which maintains joint sales and shared services agreements (JSA/SSA) with Morgan Murphy Media, owner of CBS affiliate KOAM-TV (channel 7, also licensed to Pittsburg), for the provision of certain services. The two stations share studios and transmitter facilities on US 69 south of Pittsburg, with a secondary studio and news bureau on South Range Line Road in Joplin.

Although KFJX broadcasts a digital signal of its own, its primary channel is simulcast in high definition on KOAM-TV's second digital subchannel from the same transmitter site because the KFJX signal is weaker (45.1 kW vs. 98.8 kW for KOAM-TV).

== History ==
The station signed on the air on October 18, 2003; the station was launched primarily to bring a Fox affiliate to the area, since the closest Fox affiliates were located in Kansas City (WDAF-TV), Springfield (KDEB, now MyNetworkTV affiliate KOZL-TV) and Tulsa (KOKI-TV), as well as the cable service Foxnet (which was closed in 2006), all of which were carried on most cable providers within the Joplin area. KFJX may have also been launched in response to the Nexstar Broadcasting Group KODE-TV/KSNF duopoly, which began in 2002 when KODE-TV was acquired by Mission Broadcasting through its acquisition of Quorum Broadcasting.

Because it was granted an original construction permit after the FCC finalized the DTV allotment plan on April 21, 1997, the station did not receive a companion channel for a digital television station and would have originally had to make a "flash cut" turning off its analog transmitter and turning on its digital transmitter. Instead, on February 17, 2009, KFJX began broadcasting a digital signal on channel 13, which was the former digital assignment of KOAM, after receiving FCC permission to do so. KFJX continued to broadcast its analog signal on channel 14 before signing it off permanently on May 8, 2009, when a line of severe thunderstorms damaged the broadcast tower, forcing the removal of the antenna.

In June 2010, the DirecTV satellite system added Joplin locals to their channel lineup. Initially, KFJX and sister station KOAM were unable to come to an agreement with DirecTV to have the stations carried. In February 2012, KOAM and KFJX began airing on DirecTV.

KFJX is the only Joplin–Pittsburg commercial television station that never has changed its affiliation, having been a Fox affiliate since signing on.

On August 3, 2018, a 720p HD feed (branded as "The 4-States CW") of The CW's national CW Plus service was added to subchannel 14.2, succeeding cable-only "KSXF" (which was one of the many cable-only CW Plus and original WB 100+ affiliates with fictional call signs) as the CW Plus affiliate for the Joplin–Pittsburg television market.

In 2024, KFJX parent company Morgan Murphy Media reached an agreement to broadcast eight Oklahoma City Thunder games. Games aired on KFJX or sister stations KOAM-TV and KFJX-DT3.

== Newscasts ==
The station airs a nightly 9 p.m. newscast, produced by KOAM, that debuted on April 5, 2004, and expanded to include a weekend edition in the fall of 2005. On June 1, 2010, the weekday edition of Fox 14 News at Nine expanded to an hour. In the spring of 2012, KFJX began airing a rebroadcast of the KOAM Morning News starting at 7 a.m. It was briefly discontinued, but was brought back on January 28, 2019, under the new brand KOAM Morning News on Fox 14. On April 1, 2019, the 9 p.m. newscast was rebranded as KOAM News at Nine on Fox 14.

== Subchannels ==
The station's signal is multiplexed:

Subchannels of KFJX
| Subchannel | Res. | Short name | Programming |
|---|---|---|---|
| 14.1 | 720p | KFJX-HD | Fox |
| 14.2 | 720p | KFJX-CW | The CW Plus |
| 14.3 | 480i | Start | Start TV |
| 14.4 | 480i | Dabl | Dabl |

== See also ==
- KOAM-TV
