= KKOW-FM =

Coordinates: 37.312°N 94.816°W

- Pittsburg, Kansas; United States
- Broadcast area: Joplin, Missouri
- Frequency: 96.9 MHz
- Branding: 96.9 The Kow

Programming
- Format: Country music

Ownership
- Owner: American Media Investments

History
- First air date: April 20, 1975
- Former call signs: KMRJ (1975–1982); KDBQ (1982–1984); KQWK (1984–1986); KKOW-FM (1986–1989); KRKN (1989–1990)

Technical information
- Licensing authority: FCC
- Facility ID: 1877
- Class: C1
- ERP: 100,000 watts
- HAAT: 278 meters (912 ft)

Links
- Public license information: Public file; LMS
- Website: www.kkowfm.com

KKOW-FM "96.9 The Kow" is a country music station licensed to Pittsburg, Kansas, owned by American Media Investments.

== History ==
96.9 FM was brought on the air in 1975, as KMRJ by Jim Harbart. At its inception it was an adult contemporary station broadcasting from studios on Quincy Street in Pittsburg. In 1982, the station was sold to John David and Richard Chegwin, who retained the format but changed the call sign to KDBQ.

Ownership changed again in 1984, when Tim Menowsky and Frank Bell took ownership and branded the station KQWK "Quick Rock 97" with a hybrid contemporary hit radio/album-oriented rock format.

In 1986, the station was purchased by its current owner, American Media Investments, which relocated the studios across the state line to Joplin, Missouri. With new KKOW-FM callsign, the station continued with a rock format until the studios were moved to their current location outside Pittsburg, at which time the station became "Hot Country". The station returned to KKOW-FM after a short stint as KRKN between 1989 and 1990. In 1992, KKOW adopted the "Kow" moniker that it still holds to this day.
