= KSEK-FM =

- Girard, Kansas; United States
- Broadcast area: Pittsburg, Kansas - Joplin, Missouri
- Frequency: 99.1 MHz
- Branding: Four States Fox Sports Radio

Programming
- Format: Sports
- Affiliations: Fox Sports Radio

Ownership
- Owner: American Media Investments, Inc.

History
- First air date: 1977

Technical information
- Licensing authority: FCC
- Facility ID: 22609
- Class: A
- ERP: 6,000 watts
- HAAT: 99 meters (325 ft)
- Transmitter coordinates: 37°29′2.00″N 94°51′8.00″W
- Translators: 100.1 K261ET (Neosho, via KBTN)
- Repeater: 1420 KBTN (Neosho)

Links
- Public license information: Public file; LMS
- Webcast: Listen Live
- Website: fox991fm.com

KSEK-FM (99.1 FM) is a radio station broadcasting a sports talk format. Licensed to Girard, Kansas, United States, it serves the Pittsburg area. The station is currently owned by American Media Investments, Inc.

Before June 24, 2013, the station broadcast a sports talk format. Before June 1, 2010, the station broadcast an active rock format.

KSEK is home to Pittsburg High School sports broadcasts. They also are an affiliate of the syndicated Pink Floyd show "Floydian Slip."

On January 31, 2022, the station changed their format from classic rock to sports.
