= KOAM-TV =

Television station in Pittsburg, Kansas

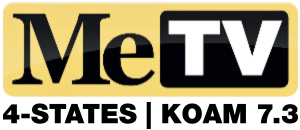
- Pittsburg, Kansas; Joplin, Missouri; United States
- City: Pittsburg, Kansas
- Channels: Digital: 7 (VHF); Virtual: 7
- Branding: KOAM-TV 7; KOAM News Now; Fox 14 (7.2); MeTV 4-States (7.3)

Programming
- Affiliations: 7.1: CBS; 7.2: Fox; for others, see § Subchannels

Ownership
- Owner: Morgan Murphy Media; (QueenB Television of Kansas/Missouri, LLC)
- Sister stations: KFJX

History
- First air date: December 13, 1953
- Former channel numbers: Analog: 7 (VHF, 1953–2009); Digital: 13 (VHF, 2001–2009)
- Former affiliations: NBC (1953–1982); CBS (secondary, 1953–1954); DuMont (secondary, 1953–1955); ABC (secondary, 1953–1968)
- Call sign meaning: Kansas, Oklahoma, Arkansas, Missouri

Technical information
- Licensing authority: FCC
- Facility ID: 58552
- ERP: 98.8 kW
- HAAT: 320 m (1,050 ft)
- Transmitter coordinates: 37°13′15″N 94°42′26″W

Links
- Public license information: Public file; LMS
- Website: www.koamnewsnow.com

KOAM-TV (channel 7) is a television station licensed to Pittsburg, Kansas, United States, serving the Joplin, Missouri–Pittsburg, Kansas market as an affiliate of CBS. It is owned by Morgan Murphy Media, which provides certain services to dual Fox/CW+ affiliate KFJX (channel 14, also licensed to Pittsburg) under joint sales and shared services agreements (JSA/SSA) with owner SagamoreHill Broadcasting. The two stations share studios and transmitter facilities on US 69 south of Pittsburg, with a secondary studio and news bureau on South Range Line Road in Joplin.

== History ==
KOAM-TV first signed on at 5:22 p.m. on December 13, 1953, under the ownership of MidContinent Broadcasting Company, a joint venture of The Joplin Globe newspaper and E. Victor Baxter and Lester E. Cox, owners of KOAM radio (860 AM, the current KKOW), with Baxter and Cox holding a controlling interest. The Globe would eventually sell its minority stake in the station to Baxter and Cox.

KOAM-TV launched as a primary affiliate of NBC, owing to KOAM radio's long affiliation with NBC Radio, though it also had secondary affiliations with CBS (until KSWM-TV launched in 1954), DuMont (until that network's 1956 closure) and ABC (until January 1968, when KODE became a full-time ABC affiliate and KUHI-TV signed on with CBS). On September 5, 1982, KOAM swapped affiliations with KTVJ (the former KUHI-TV and now known as KSNF) and became a CBS affiliate. Mid-Continent Broadcasting sold the station to Draper Communications, who also owned WBOC-TV in Salisbury, Maryland, in 1984. Draper then sold it to KOAM Ltd. Partnership in 1987.

On October 14, 1994, Saga Communications acquired KOAM-TV from Draper, making its debut in television broadcasting.

KOAM's digital signal on channel 13 signed on in 2001 and remained until KOAM turned off its analog signal at 12:38 a.m. on February 17, 2009 (the original date on which full-power television stations in the United States were to transition from analog to digital broadcasts under federal mandate, which was later pushed back to June 12, 2009), following The Late Late Show with Craig Ferguson, at which time KOAM ceased analog broadcasting and its digital broadcast returned to channel 7. Sister station KFJX, the market's Fox affiliate, moved onto KOAM's former digital channel 13 (KFJX continued to broadcast on analog channel 14 until May 2009 when a line of severe thunderstorms damaged the broadcast tower, forcing the removal of the antenna). KFJX's signal is simulcast in high definition on KOAM's digital subchannel 7.2.

In June 2010, the DirecTV satellite system added Joplin locals to its channel lineup. Initially, KOAM and sister station KFJX refused to allow DirecTV to carry their stations. In February 2012, KOAM and KFJX began airing on DirecTV.

On May 10, 2017, Morgan Murphy Media announced that it would acquire Saga Communications' television clusters in Joplin, Missouri, including KOAM-TV, and Victoria, Texas, including KAVU-TV. The sale was completed on September 1.

In 2024, KOAM parent company Morgan Murphy Media reached an agreement to broadcast eight Oklahoma City Thunder games. Games aired on KOAM-TV or sister stations KFJX and KFJX-DT3.

== News operation ==
KOAM presently broadcasts 21 1/2 hours of locally produced newscasts each week (with four hours each weekday, one hour on Saturdays and a half-hour on Sundays).

=== Notable former on-air staff ===
- Brian Williams

== Subchannels ==
The station's signal is multiplexed:

Subchannels of KOAM-TV
Subchannel	Res.	Short name	Programming
7.1	1080i	KOAM-HD	CBS
7.2	720p	KFJX-HD	Fox (KFJX)
7.3	480i	MeTV	MeTV
7.4	480i	H&I	Heroes & Icons
7.5	480i	QVC	QVC
7.6	480i	HSN	HSN

Simulcast of subchannels of another station

In September 2019, KOAM added MeTV to subchannel 7.3 as the Joplin–Pittsburg market did not have a MeTV affiliate.
