= National Register of Historic Places listings in Woodward County, Oklahoma =

Location of Woodward County in Oklahoma

This is a list of the National Register of Historic Places listings in Woodward County, Oklahoma.

This is intended to be a complete list of the properties and districts on the National Register of Historic Places in Woodward County, Oklahoma, United States. The locations of National Register properties and districts for which the latitude and longitude coordinates are included below, may be seen in a map.

There are 5 properties and districts listed on the National Register in the county.

This National Park Service list is complete through NPS recent listings posted March 14, 2025.

== Current listings ==
| | Name on the Register | Image | Date listed | Location | City or town | Description |
|---|---|---|---|---|---|---|
| 1 | Fort Supply Historic District | Fort Supply Historic District | June 21, 1971 (#71000675) | Western State Hospital grounds 36°34′35″N 99°33′36″W | Fort Supply | |
| 2 | L. L. Stein House | L. L. Stein House | October 7, 1983 (#83004225) | 1001 10th St. 36°26′12″N 99°23′35″W | Woodward | House of early Woodward banker, one of original land-run settlers. |
| 3 | Woodward Crystal Beach Park | Woodward Crystal Beach Park | September 8, 1988 (#88001359) | Jim Ben and Temple Houston Sts. 36°25′32″N 99°22′26″W | Woodward | |
| 4 | Woodward Federal Courthouse and Post Office | Woodward Federal Courthouse and Post Office | September 6, 2007 (#07000915) | 1023 10th St. 36°26′10″N 99°23′31″W | Woodward | |
| 5 | The Woodward Theater | The Woodward Theater | December 4, 2008 (#08001153) | 818 Main; 36°26′10″N 99°23′25″W | Woodward | |

== See also ==
- List of National Historic Landmarks in Oklahoma
- National Register of Historic Places listings in Oklahoma
