= KJIL =

Christian radio station in Copeland, Kansas

- Copeland, Kansas; United States
- Broadcast area: Dodge City, Kansas; Garden City, Kansas; Liberal, Kansas
- Frequency: 99.1 MHz

Programming
- Format: Christian Adult Contemporary Music

Ownership
- Owner: Great Plains Christian Radio, Inc.
- Sister stations: KHYM

History
- First air date: September 5, 1992

Technical information
- Licensing authority: FCC
- Facility ID: 24987
- Class: C1
- ERP: 100,000 watts
- HAAT: 285 meters (935 ft)
- Transmitter coordinates: 37°28′34″N 100°36′01″W

Links
- Public license information: Public file; LMS
- Webcast: Listen to KJIL West; Listen to KJIL East
- Website: kjil.online

KJIL is a Christian radio station broadcasting on 99.1 FM, licensed to Copeland, Kansas and serving the areas of Dodge City, Kansas, Garden City, Kansas, and Liberal, Kansas. The station is owned by Great Plains Christian Radio.

The station's format consists primarily of Christian adult contemporary music, with a few Christian talk and teaching programs.

== History ==
KJIL began broadcasting September 5, 1992. The station's first translator began broadcasting in 1994. In December 1999, 90.7 KJOV in Woodward, Oklahoma began simulcasting KJIL. Great Plains Christian Radio purchased the station for $60,000 the following year.

In 2001, Great Plains Christian Radio acquired country music formatted KDMM-FM 105.7 in Herington, Kansas, and the station adopted a Christian adult contemporary format, with its call sign being changed to KJRL.

In 2026, Great Plains Christian Radio acquired stations from The Praise Network, including KPRD and KGCR. The stations flipped to the KJIL branding on June 1, 2026.

== Translators ==
KJIL is also heard on translators throughout Kansas, Oklahoma, Texas, and Colorado, as well as on full power stations KJRL 105.7 in Herington, Kansas, KJLG 91.9 in Emporia, Kansas, KJGC 88.9 in Garden City, Kansas, KJHI 88.7 in Haviland, Kansas, KJVL 88.1 in Hutchinson, Kansas, KJIH 89.9 in Manhattan, Kansas, KZUH 92.7 in Minneapolis, Kansas, KJLJ 88.5 in Scott City, Kansas, KNGM 88.9 in Guymon, Oklahoma, KZZW 104.5 in Mooreland, Oklahoma, KJHL 90.9 in Boise City, Oklahoma, and KJLB 89.7 in Lamar, Colorado.

=== Kansas ===
Call sign	Frequency	City of license	FID	ERP (W)	HAAT	Class	FCC info
KJRL	105.7 FM	Herington, Kansas	40115	12,500	141 m (463 ft)	C3	LMS
KJLG	91.9 FM	Emporia, Kansas	10904	3,000	81 m (266 ft)	A	LMS
KJGC	88.9 FM	Garden City, Kansas	763819	240	84 m (276 ft)	A	LMS
KJHI	88.7 FM	Haviland, Kansas	764008	2,500	128 m (420 ft)	A	LMS
KJVL	88.1 FM	Hutchinson, Kansas	174370	570	57 m (187 ft)	A	LMS
KJIH	89.9 FM	Manhattan, Kansas	171769	3,500	92 m (302 ft)	A	LMS
KJLJ	88.5 FM	Scott City, Kansas	174179	25,000	89 m (292 ft)	C3	LMS
KZUH	92.7 FM	Minneapolis, Kansas	37127	50,000	142 m (466 ft)	C2	LMS
K234AG	94.7 FM	Ashland, Kansas	82411	205	59 m (194 ft)	D	LMS
K250AT	97.9 FM	Belleville, Kansas	152763	180	33.4 m (110 ft)	D	LMS
K244EL	96.7 FM	Clay Center, Kansas	142276	208	68 m (223 ft)	D	LMS
K294AI	106.7 FM	Courtland, Kansas	12842	250	44 m (144 ft)	D	LMS
K228EE	93.5 FM	Elkhart, Kansas	142289	170	102.2 m (335 ft)	D	LMS
K203FB	88.5 FM	Hays, Kansas	94131	250	69 m (226 ft)	D	LMS
K222AX	92.3 FM	Junction City, Kansas	142237	170	44.5 m (146 ft)	D	LMS
K299AR	107.7 FM	McPherson, Kansas	142269	170	82.3 m (270 ft)	D	LMS
K266BZ	101.1 FM	Ness City, Kansas	142283	170	72 m (236 ft)	D	LMS
K237DN	95.3 FM	Pratt, Kansas	142236	170	55 m (180 ft)	D	LMS
K209GC	89.7 FM	Quinter, Kansas	24699	232	74 m (243 ft)	D	LMS
K204CD	88.7 FM	Tribune, Kansas	25115	250	39 m (128 ft)	D	LMS
K231BG	94.1 FM	WaKeeney, Kansas	142235	170	68.5 m (225 ft)	D	LMS

=== Oklahoma ===
Call sign	Frequency	City of license	FID	ERP (W)	HAAT	Class	FCC info
KZZW	104.5 FM	Mooreland, Oklahoma	166085	65,000	365 m (1,198 ft)	C1	LMS
KJHL	90.9 FM	Boise City, Oklahoma	175834	10,000	107 m (351 ft)	C3	LMS
KNGM	88.9 FM	Guymon, Oklahoma	174174	25,000	98 m (322 ft)	C3	LMS
K227DZ	93.3 FM	Alva, Oklahoma	73666	250	50 m (164 ft)	D	LMS
K204FY	88.7 FM	Fairview, Oklahoma	142233	50	176.4 m (579 ft)	D	LMS
K204GU	88.7 FM	Enid, Oklahoma	88638	140	0 m (0 ft)	D	LMS

=== Texas ===
Call sign	Frequency	City of license	FID	ERP (W)	Class	FCC info
KJJL	88.5 FM	Perryton, Texas	764006	1,200 (vertical only)	A	LMS
K218BS	91.5 FM	Booker, Texas	6415	193	D	LMS
K295BU	106.9 FM	Dumas, Texas	142239	170	D	LMS
K296FF	107.1 FM	Spearman, Texas	142297	170	D	LMS

=== Colorado ===
Call sign	Frequency	City of license	FID	ERP (W)	HAAT	Class	FCC info
KJLB	89.7 FM	Lamar, Colorado	764002	1,000	70 m (230 ft)	A	LMS
K203BW	88.5 FM	Holly, Colorado	60769	195	38 m (125 ft)	D	LMS
