= KLSI =

KLSI may refer to:

- KLSI (FM), a radio station (107.3 FM) licensed to serve Mooreland, Oklahoma, United States
- KAIV, a radio station (92.7 FM) licensed to serve Thousand Oaks, California, United States, which held the call sign KLSI from 2012 to 2013
