= KWDQ =

- Woodward, Oklahoma; United States
- Broadcast area: Northwest Oklahoma
- Frequency: 102.3 MHz
- Branding: Q102.3

Programming
- Format: Active rock
- Affiliations: Compass Media Networks; United Stations Radio Networks

Ownership
- Owner: Classic Communications, Inc.
- Sister stations: KLSI, KSIW, KWFX

History
- First air date: January 9, 1990

Technical information
- Licensing authority: FCC
- Facility ID: 11751
- Class: C1
- ERP: 100,000 watts
- HAAT: 264.5 meters (868 ft)
- Transmitter coordinates: 36°22′31″N 99°28′32″W

Links
- Public license information: Public file; LMS
- Webcast: Listen live
- Website: woodwardradio.com/kwdq/

KWDQ (102.3 FM) is a radio station airing an active rock format licensed to Woodward, Oklahoma. The station is owned by Classic Communications, Inc.
