= KSIW =

- Woodward, Oklahoma; United States
- Frequency: 1450 kHz

Programming
- Format: Sports
- Affiliations: WWLS-FM

Ownership
- Owner: Classic Communications, Inc.
- Sister stations: KWFX, KWDQ, KLSI

History
- First air date: September 1947
- Call sign meaning: Sports in Woodward

Technical information
- Licensing authority: FCC
- Facility ID: 22822
- Class: C
- Power: 1,000 watts
- Transmitter coordinates: 36°25′42″N 99°24′10″W
- Translator: 98.1 K251CM (Woodward)

Links
- Public license information: Public file; LMS
- Website: KSIW Online

KSIW (1450 AM) is a radio station airing a sports format licensed to Woodward, Oklahoma. The station is owned by Classic Communications, Inc.

== Translators ==
Broadcast translator for KSIW
Call sign	Frequency	City of license	FID	ERP (W)	HAAT	Class	FCC info
K251CM	98.1 FM	Woodward, Oklahoma	200718	250	68 m (223 ft)	D	LMS
