= KZZW =

- Mooreland, Oklahoma; United States
- Broadcast area: Woodward, Oklahoma
- Frequency: 104.5 MHz
- Branding: KJIL

Programming
- Format: Christian contemporary

Ownership
- Owner: Great Plains Christian Radio, Inc.

Technical information
- Licensing authority: FCC
- Facility ID: 166085
- Class: C1
- ERP: 62,000 watts
- HAAT: 365 metres (1,198 ft)
- Transmitter coordinates: 36°16′23.1″N 99°26′46.4″W

Links
- Public license information: Public file; LMS
- Website: www.kjil.com

KZZW (104.5 FM) is a radio station licensed to serve the community of Mooreland, Oklahoma. The station is owned by Great Plains Christian Radio, Inc. and airs a christian contemporary format.

The station was assigned the KZZW call sign by the Federal Communications Commission on March 13, 2012.

The station became a repeater for KJIL in January 2023.

Former logo (2012–2023)
