= Woodward, Oklahoma =

- City
- Main Street
- Motto: "Energy For Life"
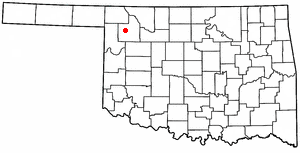
- Location of Woodward, Oklahoma

- Location in the United States
- Coordinates: 36°25′28″N 99°24′21″W
- Country: United States
- State: Oklahoma
- County: Woodward

Government
  - Type: City Manager Commission
  - City Manager: Shaun Barnett

Area
  - Total: 13.18 sq mi (34.13 km^{2})
  - Land: 13.12 sq mi (33.98 km^{2})
  - Water: 0.058 sq mi (0.15 km^{2})
- Elevation: 1,982 ft (604 m)

Population (2020)
  - Total: 12,133
  - Density: 924.7/sq mi (357.01/km^{2})
- Time zone: UTC-6 (Central (CST))
  - Summer (DST): UTC-5 (CDT)
- ZIP codes: 73801-73802
- Area code: 580
- FIPS code: 40-82150
- GNIS feature ID: 2412305
- Website: cityofwoodward-ok.gov

Woodward is a city in and the county seat of Woodward County, Oklahoma, United States. It is the largest city in a nine-county area. The population was 12,133 at the time of the 2020 census.

The area was historically occupied by the Kiowa, Comanche, Cheyenne and Arapaho tribes. European-American settlers established the town in 1887 after construction of the railroad to that point for shipping cattle to markets. The town was on the Great Western Cattle Trail. In the 19th century, it was one of the most important depots in the Oklahoma Territory for shipping cattle to the East. As an important cattle town, it had the rough frontier bawdiness of the time. The United States opened up much of the area to European-American settlement by the Land Run of 1893, and migrants rushed into the area.

Boiling Springs State Park, named for its artesian springs that seem to boil, has been established east of the city.

== History ==
=== Native American settlement ===
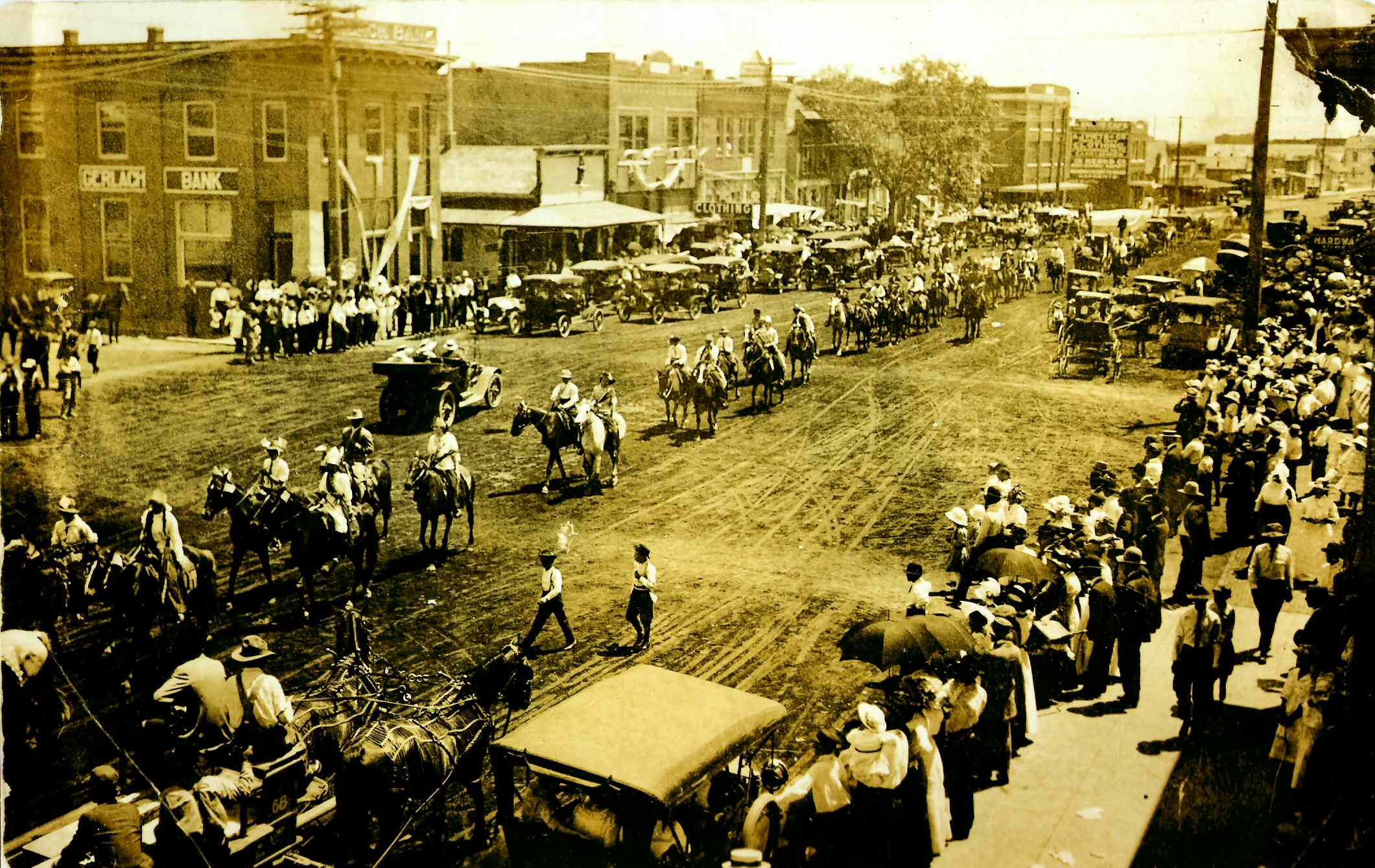
Cabinet Saloon (located behind tree in center of photograph), Main Street, c. 1911

For thousands of years, succeeding cultures of indigenous peoples inhabited the areas along the North Canadian River. The Plains tribes adopted use of the horse from the Spanish settlers in the 17th and 18th centuries, which greatly increased their range of nomadic hunting. Before the American Civil War, the historic Plains tribes of the Kiowa, Comanche, Apache, Cheyenne, and Arapaho occupied this area.

Boiling Springs, near present-day Woodward, was a favorite campsite of the Plains Indians. A battle between the Kiowa and Cheyenne tribes took place nearby in 1838. The Kiowa and Comanche tribes also battled the United States Army in 1868 in this area, when the US redeployed troops after the Civil War against Native Americans in the West.

In the late 19th century, these tribes fought numerous battles against the United States soldiers and settlers through a wide area around the springs. After the war, United States Army made various expeditions against the Plains tribes in the Cherokee Outlet. Lieutenant Colonels Alfred Sully and George Armstrong Custer, and General Philip Sheridan, stationed nearby at Fort Supply, led these expeditions. In the 1880s, the Comanche considered this area as part of their "Comancheria", the unofficial name of their territory, which stretched from Kansas to Mexico.

=== Settlement as a town ===
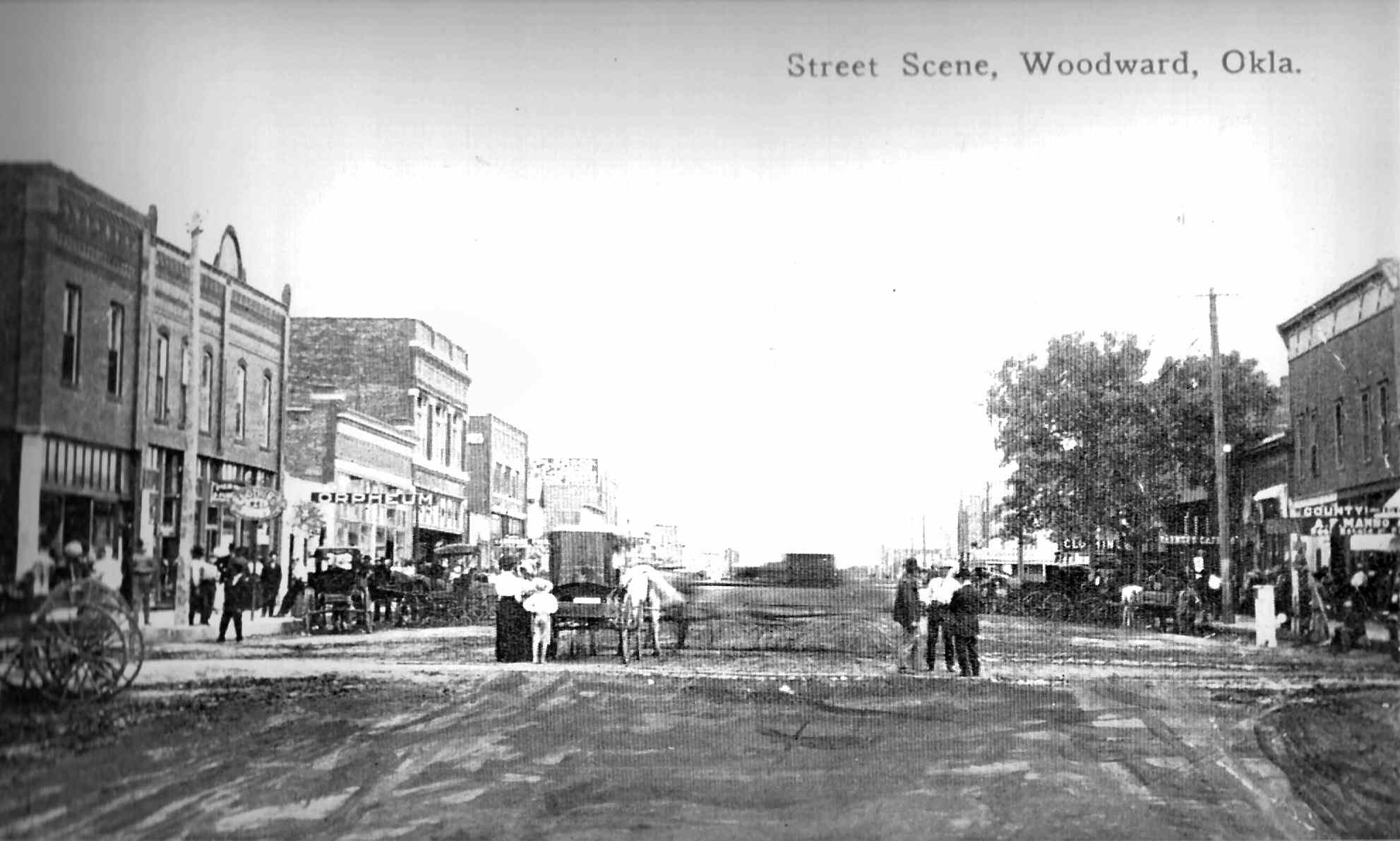
Main Street, c. 1910

In April 1887, the Southern Kansas Railway, a subsidiary of the Atchison, Topeka and Santa Fe Railway, built tracks from Kiowa, Kansas to Fort Reno Military Road near the south bank of the North Canadian River. European-American settlers established Woodward at this junction. The source of the name of the town a mystery. People perhaps named the town for Brinton W. Woodward, usually identified as a Santa Fe Railway director, or bison hunter, teamster, and eventually local saddle-maker Richard "Uncle Dick" Woodward.

The town quickly developed as an important shipping point, both for provisioning Fort Supply and as a place for loading cattle grazed in the Cherokee Outlet for shipment to eastern markets. Woodward ranked among the most important depots in the Oklahoma Territory for shipping cattle to the Eastern and Northern states. The Great Western Cattle Trail met the railroad where Woodward developed. In the summer of 1893, carpenters erected the first government building at the railroad depot, called Woodward. Woodward then had 200 residents.

On September 16, 1893, officials opened the Cherokee Outlet across northern Oklahoma, which more than 50,000 migrants settled in the greatest land run in American history. A surveying error then caused location of the government town, its land office, and other public buildings in the section west of the existing improvements, 15 blocks away from the depot, post office, and stockyards. Since territorial days, Woodward served as the county seat of Woodward County.

Two towns developed: East Woodward, called Denver, began near the improvements, and Woodward began near the land office. In October 1894, people moved the depot west and relocated it between 5th Street and 6th Street; East Woodward businesses followed the depot. Government in time moved the land office, jail, and other buildings east toward the depot. The towns merged into one. The joining resulted in the curve in the long Main Street of the town at 8th Street, originally Boundary Street.

On March 13, 1894, outlaws Bill Doolin and Bill Dalton robbed the railroad station at Woodward, taking an undisclosed amount of money.

Like Dodge City, Kansas, to the North, Woodward boasted a cattle town array of saloons, gambling halls, and brothels. Drovers widely knew the Equity, Midway, Shamrock, and Cabinet saloons of Woodward and the Dew Drop Inn as their watering holes at the end of a cattle drive. Dollie Kezer worked at some of most famous brothels of Denver, Colorado, and Horace Tabor threw lavish parties that she attended before coming to Woodward, where she owned and managed the Dew Drop Inn, which served as another watering hole and also as a brothel.

In 1894, Temple Lea Houston, former Texas state senator and son of Samuel Houston, moved his law practice and family to Woodward. After a personal disagreement in the Cabinet Saloon with the brother and father of the outlaw Al Jennings, Houston shot and killed the brother. Jack E. Love joined his close friend, Temple Lea Houston, in the gunfight. The events slowed the career of neither man. Authorities in Woodward charged and tried Houston for murder, but a jury acquitted him on grounds of self-defense. Houston won a reputation as a brilliant trial lawyer, known for his courtroom dramatics. He delivered his "Soiled Dove Plea" in a makeshift courtroom in the Woodward opera house, arguing on behalf of a prostitute who worked at the Dew Drop Inn; after ten minutes' consideration, the jury acquitted her. Houston died in 1905 in Woodward and is buried there.

People later elected Jack E. Love to the Oklahoma Corporation Commission, and he served as its first chairman.

Woodward ranked as one of the most extensive cattle shipping points in Oklahoma Territory. Some men rode for the large cattle outfits of the 1890s and later developed rodeo as a sport. Cow ponies, tied to hitching posts, lined the sandy Main Street.

When open range ended in 1901, however, homesteaders rushed into Woodward County. By late 1902 farmers' wagons filled with corn, cotton, or sorghum crops for market had already replaced the cow ponies.

On September 7, 1907, William Jennings Bryan spoke to 20,000 people gathered in Woodward, urging the ratification of proposed state constitution of Oklahoma and the election of a Democratic Party ticket. Two months later, President Theodore Roosevelt signed the act of Congress proclaiming admission of Oklahoma as a state, using a quill from an American golden eagle captured near Woodward. At that time the population of Woodward exceeded 2,000.

=== County seat and cattle town ===
An Act of Congress in 1911 designated Woodward a court town for the United States District Court for the Western District of Oklahoma.

The Wichita Falls and Northwestern Railway constructed a rail line through Woodward County and Woodward in 1911/1912; the Missouri–Kansas–Texas Railroad later acquired this line.

People introduced successfully Hereford cattle in Woodward County. With this development, cattlemen, such as William Thomas Waggoner, attempted to lease school lands in Woodward County for grazing. These attempts led Woodward County ranchers to form the Oklahoma Livestock Association. At the urging of United States Senator Thomas Pryor Gore and David P. Marum, the former law partner of Temple Lea Houston, in 1912 the United States government located an agricultural research station in Woodward. With the dairy cows replacing beef cattle and progress measured in the number of plow-broken acres, the United States Department of Agriculture established the Great Plains Field Station, immediately southwest of town, in 1913. Wagons of farmers with other crops gave way to wheat as the cash crop before 1914.

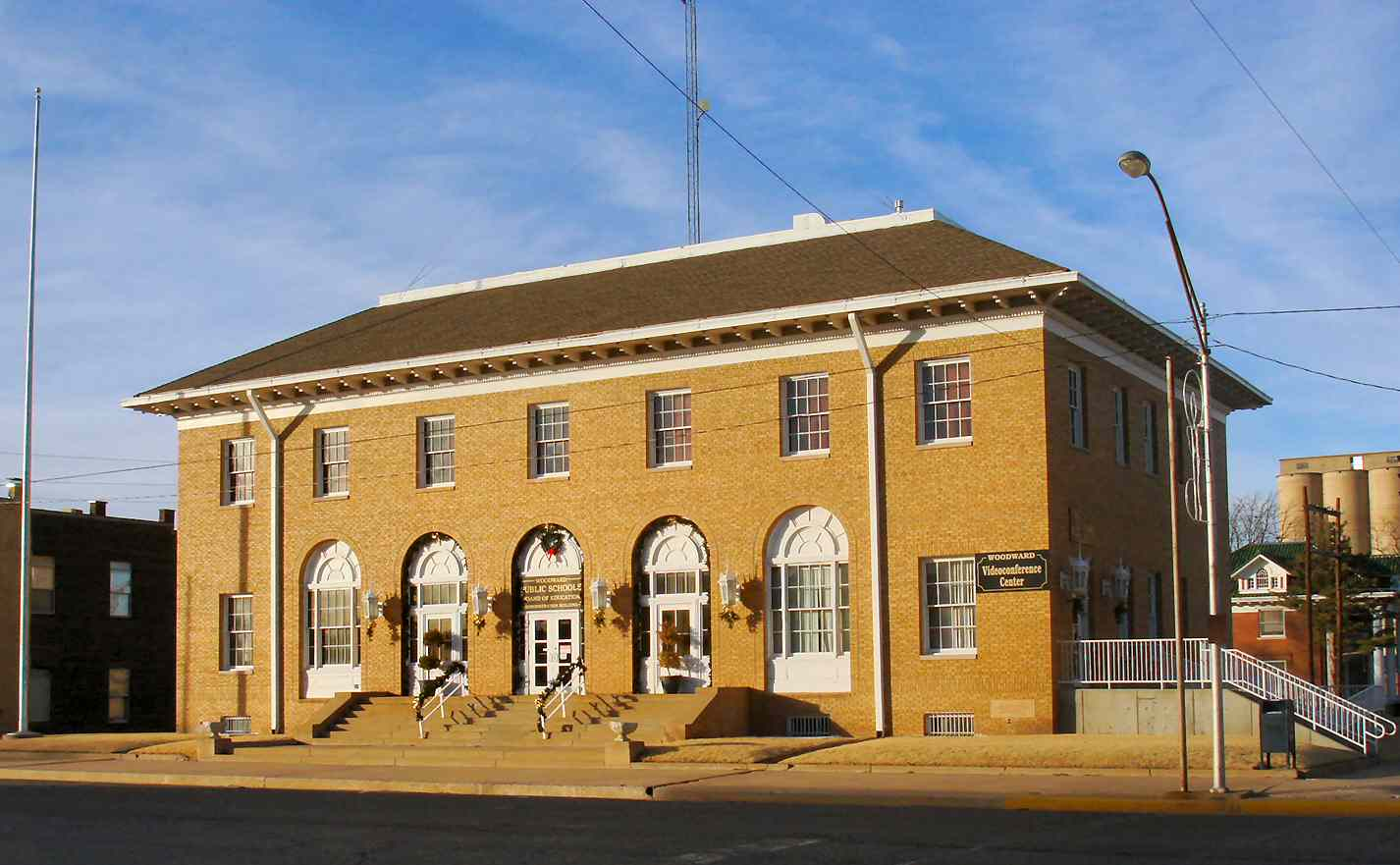
Old Woodward Post Office and Federal Courthouse

People constructed Woodward Federal Courthouse and Post Office in Woodward in 1918, and it opened in 1921. Federal court held dockets annually each November in Woodward.

The Woodward News began as the local newspaper in 1926.

Some of the men who rode for the large cattle outfits three decades earlier organized the Elks Rodeo, which began in 1929 at an arena north of town. The ranching and cattle industries still dominated economy of Woodward.

During the Great Depression, local Works Progress Administration projects included the damming of an artesian well, a failed oil-well venture, to form Crystal Beach Lake and its adjacent park. This facility served as a playground for trade area of Woodward and home for the Elks Rodeo.

Town leaders certainly prevented fencing of the market drives away from the stockyards in the early years. On 23 February 1933, the Woodward Livestock Auction, the first commercial-grade cattle auction in Oklahoma, opened, keeping the cattle-marketing tradition.

On 13 September 1934, Charles Lindbergh and Anne Morrow Lindbergh made an unexpected emergency landing 23 miles (37 km) northeast of Woodward. They spent two days at a rural farm, waiting for a relief plane to arrive at Woodward. Charles Lindbergh refused to give any interviews but said that he and his wife, eager for privacy, no longer wanted the public spotlight.

=== Economic boom ===
From 1934, Trego’s Westwear manufactured western cut clothing for customers all over the world. The company frequently made costumes for rodeo stars, movie stars, Dale Evans, and Roy Rogers.

In late November 1956, people first discovered natural gas in Woodward County at McCormick Number One well; a two-decade boom of oil and gas production ensued. Main Street and Oklahoma Avenue stretched westward into the "Oil Patch."

On January 14, 1957, United States Secretary of Agriculture Ezra Taft Benson accompanied President Dwight David Eisenhower in a 12 miles (19 km) inspection tour of drought-damaged lands around Woodward. A crowd of 12,000 received him at Woodward Municipal Airport.

One of the largest deposits of iodine in the world underlies many portions of Woodward County. Since 1977, numerous companies explored and produced this crude iodine. These companies include Woodward Iodine and Deepwater Chemicals, located in Woodward.

As beef cattle again dominated the land and with the new goal of reestablishing grassy pastures, in 1978, United States Department of Agriculture renamed its facility the Southern Plains Range Research Station.

The population exceeded 10,000 in the 1970s. Good times brought a new high school, a vocational-technical school, a new post office, a new hospital, and an industrial park.

The economic decline in the oil industry during the 1980s caused the first population decrease in the history of the city.

National Register of Historic Places listings in Woodward County, Oklahoma, in 1988 added Woodward Crystal Beach Park.

In March 2023, the National Collegiate Soil Judging Contest took place in Woodward. The event was organized by the Oklahoma State University Ferguson College of Agriculture and USDA-NRCS Woodward Major Land Resource Area (MLRA) Soil Survey Office and brought 240 students from 24 universities to Woodward. Participating students completed technical descriptions, classifications, and interpretations of soil profiles in the competition, which was won by the University of Maryland.

=== Tornadoes ===
==== 1947 ====
On April 9, 1947, the deadliest tornado in Oklahoma history (an F5 on the Fujita Scale) tore through Woodward, killing 107 people in the town, injuring almost 1000, and destroying 100 city blocks. The family of tornadoes, known as the 1947 Glazier–Higgins–Woodward tornadoes, ranked as the sixth deadliest in US history with a total death toll of 185. They caused many fatalities and much damage in other communities in Texas, Oklahoma, and Kansas.

==== 2012 ====
On April 14, 2012, a high-end EF3 tornado struck Woodward causing six deaths.

== Geography ==
Woodward is located in northwestern Oklahoma, on the eastern edge of the Oklahoma and Texas panhandles.

The city lies on the North Canadian River, 100 miles (160 km) east-southeast of Guymon and 85 miles (137 km) west of Enid. As the largest city in an area of nine counties, it is a commercial hub in northwestern Oklahoma.

According to the United States Census Bureau, the city has a total area of 13.2 square miles (34 km^{2}), of which 13.1 square miles (34 km^{2}) is land and 0.1 square miles (0.26 km^{2}) (0.53%) is water.

== Climate ==
Climate data for Woodward, Oklahoma
| Month | Jan | Feb | Mar | Apr | May | Jun | Jul | Aug | Sep | Oct | Nov | Dec | Year |
|---|---|---|---|---|---|---|---|---|---|---|---|---|---|
| Record high °F (°C) | 83 (28) | 91 (33) | 92 (33) | 100 (38) | 106 (41) | 111 (44) | 111 (44) | 113 (45) | 104 (40) | 100 (38) | 87 (31) | 90 (32) | 111 (44) |
| Mean daily maximum °F (°C) | 49 (9) | 54 (12) | 64 (18) | 74 (23) | 82 (28) | 91 (33) | 95 (35) | 93 (34) | 85 (29) | 74 (23) | 60 (16) | 50 (10) | 73 (23) |
| Mean daily minimum °F (°C) | 22 (−6) | 27 (−3) | 36 (2) | 46 (8) | 56 (13) | 65 (18) | 69 (21) | 67 (19) | 58 (14) | 46 (8) | 34 (1) | 24 (−4) | 46 (8) |
| Record low °F (°C) | −14 (−26) | −11 (−24) | −8 (−22) | 16 (−9) | 28 (−2) | 42 (6) | 45 (7) | 47 (8) | 33 (1) | 18 (−8) | 5 (−15) | −5 (−21) | −14 (−26) |
| Average precipitation inches (mm) | 0.71 (18) | 0.9 (23) | 2.14 (54) | 2.23 (57) | 4.32 (110) | 3.43 (87) | 2.57 (65) | 2.52 (64) | 2.15 (55) | 2.15 (55) | 1.5 (38) | 1.02 (26) | 25.63 (651) |
| Average snowfall inches (cm) | 4.6 (12) | 4.6 (12) | 2.5 (6.4) | 0.5 (1.3) | 0 (0) | 0 (0) | 0 (0) | 0 (0) | 0 (0) | 0.1 (0.25) | 1.5 (3.8) | 4.0 (10) | 17.8 (45) |
Source 1: weather.com
Source 2: Climate.ok.gov

== Demographics ==
Historical population
| Census | Pop. | Note | %± |
|---|---|---|---|
| 1910 | 2,696 | | — |
| 1920 | 3,849 | | 42.8% |
| 1930 | 5,056 | | 31.4% |
| 1940 | 5,406 | | 6.9% |
| 1950 | 5,915 | | 9.4% |
| 1960 | 7,747 | | 31.0% |
| 1970 | 9,563 | | 23.4% |
| 1980 | 13,781 | | 44.1% |
| 1990 | 12,340 | | −10.5% |
| 2000 | 11,853 | | −3.9% |
| 2010 | 12,051 | | 1.7% |
| 2020 | 12,133 | | 0.7% |
U.S. Decennial Census

=== 2020 census ===
As of the 2020 census, Woodward had a population of 12,133. The median age was 37.1 years. 25.2% of residents were under the age of 18 and 16.2% of residents were 65 years of age or older. For every 100 females there were 101.0 males, and for every 100 females age 18 and over there were 99.7 males age 18 and over.

94.4% of residents lived in urban areas, while 5.6% lived in rural areas.

There were 4,888 households in Woodward, of which 32.2% had children under the age of 18 living in them. Of all households, 45.3% were married-couple households, 21.5% were households with a male householder and no spouse or partner present, and 26.1% were households with a female householder and no spouse or partner present. About 31.2% of all households were made up of individuals and 13.5% had someone living alone who was 65 years of age or older.

There were 6,022 housing units, of which 18.8% were vacant. Among occupied housing units, 61.9% were owner-occupied and 38.1% were renter-occupied. The homeowner vacancy rate was 3.8% and the rental vacancy rate was 22.8%.

Racial composition as of the 2020 census
| Race | Percent |
|---|---|
| White | 76.7% |
| Black or African American | 0.6% |
| American Indian and Alaska Native | 3.0% |
| Asian | 0.9% |
| Native Hawaiian and Other Pacific Islander | <0.1% |
| Some other race | 7.7% |
| Two or more races | 11.0% |
| Hispanic or Latino (of any race) | 18.5% |

=== 2000 census ===
As of the 2000 census, there were 11,853 people, 4,787 households, and 3,245 families residing in the city. The population density was 903.5 inhabitants per square mile (348.8/km^{2}). There were 5,561 housing units at an average density of 423.9 per square mile (163.7/km^{2}). The racial makeup of the city was 91.98% White, 0.25% African American, 1.96% Native American, 0.67% Asian, 0.02% Pacific Islander, 3.26% from other races, and 1.86% from two or more races. Hispanic or Latino of any race were 6.06% of the population.

There were 4,787 households, out of which 33.6% had children under the age of 18 living with them, 54.6% were married couples living together, 9.5% had a female householder with no husband present, and 32.2% were non-families. 28.2% of all households were made up of individuals, and 11.9% had someone living alone who was 65 years of age or older. The average household size was 2.43 and the average family size was 2.98.

In the city, the population was spread out, with 26.9% under the age of 18, 9.5% from 18 to 24, 27.7% from 25 to 44, 21.7% from 45 to 64, and 14.2% who were 65 years of age or older. The median age was 36 years. For every 100 females, there were 92.8 males. For every 100 females age 18 and over, there were 90.3 males.

The median income for a household in the city was $32,441, and the median income for a family was $39,766. Males had a median income of $29,222 versus $19,102 for females. The per capita income for the city was $17,040. About 9.2% of families and 13.3% of the population were below the poverty line, including 14.5% of those under age 18 and 10.7% of those age 65 or over.

== Transportation ==
Woodward is served by US 412, US 270, US 183, SH 3, SH 34, and SH 15.

The West Woodward Airport (KWWR; FAA ID: WWR), located approximately 2.5 miles west of Woodward, features a paved 5502’ x 100’ runway. The airport had commercial air service through Central Airlines in the 1950s.

The Southern Transcon, being the main line of Class I freight rail carrier BNSF Railway, passes through Woodward. Shortline carrier Northwestern Oklahoma Railroad also serves the Woodward area and interchanges with the BNSF.

== Economy ==
The city maintains a city manager commission type of government. Woodward is the principal center of trade for Northwest Oklahoma and a ten-county region including counties in Kansas and Texas. It serves a trade area of greater than 50,000 people. Agriculture, petroleum, wind energy, and manufacturing all contribute to Woodward's economy.

Woodward serves as a market and processing center for wheat, cattle, hay and poultry. The city has grown around the Southern Plains Range Research Station, a United States agricultural experiment station established in 1912.

Woodward also lies in an oil and natural-gas area on the shelf of Oklahoma's Anadarko Basin. In 1956, natural gas was discovered in Woodward County. Thereafter, Woodward enjoyed significant growth due to the opening and location of oil field service and drilling companies in Woodward.

In addition to hydrocarbons, many portions of Woodward County are underlain by one of the world's largest deposits of iodine. Since 1977, numerous companies have explored for and produced crude iodine in Woodward County. Woodward Iodine and Deepwater Chemicals are located in Woodward. In 2003, Florida Power & Light Company's subsidiary, FPL Energy, and the Oklahoma Municipal Power Authority, began commercial production of electricity generated from wind turbines constructed seven miles (11 km) north of Woodward.

Manufacturers include oil field equipment, apparel, crude iodine, and printing and publishing. Clothing factories are a relatively recent addition.

CF Industries operates an ammonia facility that also produces associated nitrogen products. The plant was built by Fluor for WR Grace and Co, which operated it from 1975 to 1988 as Oklahoma Nitrogen Co. Terra Industries bought the plant from Grace in 1988. In 2010, CF Industries took over Terra, and currently operates the plant.

Woodward is the corporate headquarters for Beaver Express Service, L.L.C., Oklahoma's largest and oldest Oklahoma-based small package express and LTL motor freight carrier. Beaver Express serves the states of Arkansas, Kansas, Oklahoma, New Mexico, Missouri, and Texas.

== Agriculture ==
By the early 20th century, Hereford cattle were introduced successfully in Woodward County. With this development, cattlemen such as Dan Waggoner and his son, W.T. Waggoner, attempted to lease school lands in Woodward County for grazing. These attempts led to the formation of the Oklahoma Livestock Association by Woodward County ranchers. At the urging of Senator Thomas P. Gore and David P. Marum, the former law partner of Temple Lea Houston, in 1912 the United States government located an agricultural research station in Woodward. By 1930, the ranching and cattle industry dominated Woodward's economy. On February 23, 1933, Oklahoma's first commercial-grade cattle auction, the Woodward Livestock Auction, opened in Woodward.

In 1929, Woodward ranchers and businessmen organized the Woodward Elks Rodeo, which through 1959 was one of the premier cowboy rodeos in the nation. As many as 35,000 people would attend the three-day event. National rodeo champions such as Bob Crosby, Paul Carney, Toots Mansfield, Homer Pettigrew, Ace Soward, Eddie Curtis, Jess Goodspeed, Ike Rude, Jim Shoulders, Sonny Davis, Sonny Linger, and Tater Decker all competed at the Woodward Elks Rodeo.

== Historic businesses ==
Between 1934 and 1999, the Trego's Westwear Company of Woodward manufactured Western cut clothing for customers all over the world. Rodeo and movie stars were customers of the company and costumes were frequently made for Dale Evans and Roy Rogers. As dress became more casual in the 1980s and 1990s, interest in Western wear waned. Trego's closed its manufacturing plant in 1995.

On May 18, 1956, Charles Woodward Pappe, an entrepreneur from Kingfisher, opened the second Top-Hat Drive-In Restaurant in the United States, which was the precursor to the Sonic Drive-In. A few months earlier, Pappe had met Troy Smith, while visiting friends in Shawnee, Oklahoma. With Pappe's inspiration, Sonic was founded and eventually became one of the largest chain of fast food restaurants in the US.

== Education ==
Woodward has an early childhood center, three elementary schools, one middle school, and one high school. The Woodward school district serves more than 2,500 students. The city also has a private school, the Woodward Christian Academy, that serves more than 100 students.

The city's High Plains Technology Center offers courses and degrees in career and technical education. Woodward is also home to the Woodward campus of Northwestern Oklahoma State University, which offers courses and degrees to the local population.

== Attractions ==
The City-owned Crystal Beach Water Park features a swimming pool, play fountains, water slides, and a picnic area. Woodward Crystal Beach Park is on the National Register of Historic Places listings in Woodward County, Oklahoma.

The Woodward Sports Complex includes the newly renovated baseball stadium Fuller Park, and five Little League baseball fields.

Woodward has two golf courses, Boiling Springs and Crystal Beach Municipal Golf Course, and seven miles of the beautiful Goetzinger Walking trails. Experiment Lake is stocked for fishing seasonally.

The Conference Center, across the street from Experiment Lake, is a 33,000 square foot venue for hosting vendor booths, lectures, and other presentations.

The Woodward Arts & Theatre Council puts on concerts, theater performances, events and receptions in the historic Woodward Arts Theatre originally opened in 1929. The theater is NRHP-listed.

The Plains Indians and Pioneers Museum includes murals in The Rotunda, re-creations of pioneer businesses and offices in The Myrtle Foster Room, the Lee-Lienemann Log Cabin from the late 1800s, and many other exhibits.

The Woodward Federal Courthouse and Post Office was completed in 1921 in Renaissance Revival style, and is NRHP-listed.

L. L. Stine House, the 1916 home of early banker L. L. Stine, is NRHP-listed.

Boiling Springs State Park is to the east-northeast.

Fort Supply Lake, the adjacent Fort Supply Wildlife Management Area, and the Cooper Wildlife Management Area, are to the northwest.

== Media ==
The Woodward News has been the local news source since 1926. It is currently distributed five days a week and owned by Community Newspaper Holdings Inc., It is distributed freely to the town's residents.

- KWOX 101.1 (K101) Country; has been serving Woodward since December 1983.
- KMZE Z92 92.1 News/Talk; owned by FM92 Broadcasters
- KWFX 100.1 Country; Owned by Classic Communications
- KWDQ 102.3 (Q102) Alternative Rock; Owned by Classic Communications
- KSIW AM 1450 "Sports Animal" Sports Talk; has been serving Woodward way back into the 1950s
- KAZY 95.9 - NPR Public Radio; owned by Cameron University in Lawton OFF AIR
- KJOV 90.7 - Simulcast of KJIL 99.1 (Meade, Kansas) (Christian Radio)
- KZZW 104.5 - "104.5 KZZW" Top 40
- KCSC 95.9 - Repeater of KUCO 90.1 (Edmond, Oklahoma) (Classical)
- KLSI 107.3 - Classic Hits Owned by Classic Commmincations

Translators:

- 89.9 Simulcast from KHYM (Meade, Kansas) "Southern Gospel"
- 97.1 KREJ 100.7 Medicine Lodge, Kansas (Christian Talk/Teaching)

== Notable people ==
- Jerry Covington, fabricator of high-end custom motorcycles, and owner of Covingtons Cycle City, based in Woodward.
- Bob Fenimore, football player.
- Temple Lea Houston, last-born child of Sam Houston, a member of the Texas State Senate from 1885 to 1889.
- Gary Lakes, opera singer
- Dick Thompson Morgan, United States Congressman, 2nd District, Oklahoma 1909–15, 8th District, Oklahoma 1915–20.
- Terry Peach, farmer, rancher, Secretary and Commissioner of the Oklahoma State Board of Agriculture (2003-2011), Oklahoma State Executive Director, United States Department of Agriculture Farm Service Agency (1993–2000)
- Will Rogers, prominent comedian, was employed when young as a cowboy at a ranch near Woodward.
- Charles Swindall, United States Congressman, Oklahoma; Justice of the Supreme Court of Oklahoma, 1929–1934.
- Olin E. Teague, military hero and long-term Texas Congressman, was born in Woodward on April 6, 1910.
- Terry Buffalo Ware, red dirt country guitarist, grew up in Woodward and graduated from Woodward High.
