= KWOX =

- Woodward, Oklahoma; United States
- Frequency: 101.1 MHz
- Branding: K-101

Programming
- Format: Country music

Ownership
- Owner: Omni Communications, Inc.
- Sister stations: KMZE

History
- First air date: December 16, 1983

Technical information
- Licensing authority: FCC
- Facility ID: 50332
- Class: C0
- ERP: 82,000 watts
- HAAT: 365 meters (1,198 ft)
- Transmitter coordinates: 36.26833°N 099.44889°W

Links
- Public license information: Public file; LMS
- Webcast: Listen live
- Website: k101online.com

KWOX is a radio station airing a country music format licensed to Woodward, Oklahoma, broadcasting on 101.1 FM. The station is owned by Omni Communications, Inc. and signed on the air December 16, 1983.

Their current studios are in the 101 Center Suite K at the corner of Williams and Downs Ave.

== Former on-air staff ==
- J. Douglas Williams, KWOX co-founder & co-owner, president/ general manager/ morning show host (deceased, died August 7, 2020)
- Mark Allen - music director (now Trooper Kansas Highway Patrol)
- Trey Brooks - program director (currently Shattuck grain elevator)
- Brad Croft - music director (now media director Vision Media Oklahoma)
- JD Ford - engineer(now chief engineer KWHW-AM Altus)
- Gregory Frazier - director of engineering (Operations Director Jericho Services)
- Jeffrey Hickman - station manager (State Representative at Oklahoma House of Representatives)
- Jeffery Hitchcock -radio and TV operations engineer(master control operator GEB-AMERICA)
- Jerrod Knight - evening personality (general manager KETR-FM Commerce TX)
- Scott Lauer - news and sports reporter (Former radio voice of the NBA's Charlotte Hornets)
- Amy Lawrence - news director(Now with CBS Sports)
- Patrick Macek - program director(assistant program director at Sports Animal Tulsa)
- Artie "Boom Boom" Mcfly - evening personality (Pro DJ at Carnival Cruise Lines)
- Mindi Marx - music director (currently dispatcher for Woodward EMS)
- Pete Mundo - sports/news director (Now with CBS Radio in New York City)
- Mark Norman - station manager/ partner (1985)
- Doug Ohlemeier - K101's first news director, 1984 (now a writer for Vance Publishing's The Packer)
- James Parker - producer & co-host (now afternoons on WBAP)
- Mike Pilosof - news director(Sports Director Western Kansas Broadcast Center)
- Dan R - operations manager Now as news director - KVBC-FM, Salida, CO)
- Brian Tano - music director(Owner of Splash Radio)
- Shawn Tiemann - news/sports Director (Voice of Rogers State University basketball, Great Falls Voyagers minor league baseball)
- Jesse Schroeder - On-Air Talent (Communication Dept. Chair and Media & Communication Professor at Northwestern Oklahoma State University, former TV news anchor at KXII-TV, KTRE-TV, and KLTV)
- Tony "Wradio" Wright - operations manager
- David Wayne (retired host/music director)
- Vanessa - on-air personality and music director (teacher, morning host, KWEY-FM, Weatherford OK)
