= Woodward News =

- Type: Daily newspaper
- Format: Broadsheet
- Owner(s): Community Newspaper Holdings Inc.
- Publisher: Sheila Gay
- Editor: Johnny McMahan
- Founded: 1984
- Headquarters: Woodward, Oklahoma, USA
- Circulation: 18,500 (as of 2009)
- Website: woodwardnews.net

The Woodward News is a weekly newspaper based in Woodward, Oklahoma. The newspaper is distributed on Wednesdays. The newspaper is owned by Community Newspaper Holdings Inc. The newspaper is $2.00 for the weekly edition. It began publication in 1984.
