= Quinlan, Oklahoma =

- Unincorporated community and Census designated place
- Location within Oklahoma Location within the United States
- Coordinates: 36°27′22″N 99°02′45″W
- Country: United States
- State: Oklahoma
- County: Woodward

Area
  - Total: 0.28 sq mi (0.72 km^{2})
  - Land: 0.28 sq mi (0.72 km^{2})
  - Water: 0 sq mi (0.00 km^{2})
- Elevation: 1,736 ft (529 m)

Population (2020)
  - Total: 28
  - Density: 101.0/sq mi (38.99/km^{2})
- Time zone: UTC-6 (Central (CST))
  - Summer (DST): UTC-5 (CDT)
- Area code: 580
- GNIS feature ID: 2805350

Quinlan is an unincorporated community in Woodward County, Oklahoma, United States. As of the 2020 census, Quinlan had a population of 28. It is located on what was the Atchison, Topeka and Santa Fe Railroad, 9 miles (14 km) east of Mooreland. Quinlan began as a small agricultural community, and is old enough to appear on a 1911 Rand McNally map of the county.

== Demographics ==
=== 2020 census ===
As of the 2020 census, Quinlan had a population of 28. The median age was 45.5 years. 14.3% of residents were under the age of 18 and 17.9% of residents were 65 years of age or older. For every 100 females there were 27.3 males, and for every 100 females age 18 and over there were 26.3 males age 18 and over.

0.0% of residents lived in urban areas, while 100.0% lived in rural areas.

There were 7 households in Quinlan, of which 0.0% had children under the age of 18 living in them. Of all households, 71.4% were married-couple households, 28.6% were households with a male householder and no spouse or partner present, and 0.0% were households with a female householder and no spouse or partner present. About 14.3% of all households were made up of individuals and 0.0% had someone living alone who was 65 years of age or older.

There were 15 housing units, of which 53.3% were vacant. The homeowner vacancy rate was 0.0% and the rental vacancy rate was 0.0%.

Racial composition as of the 2020 census
Race	Number	Percent
White	27	96.4%
Black or African American	1	3.6%
American Indian and Alaska Native	0	0.0%
Asian	0	0.0%
Native Hawaiian and Other Pacific Islander	0	0.0%
Some other race	0	0.0%
Two or more races	0	0.0%
Hispanic or Latino (of any race)	0	0.0%
