= KPRD =

- Hays, Kansas; United States
- Broadcast area: Midwest Kansas
- Frequency: 88.9 MHz
- Branding: KJIL

Programming
- Format: Christian contemporary music Christian talk and teaching

Ownership
- Owner: Great Plains Christian Radio Inc.
- Sister stations: KGCR, KJIL

History
- First air date: 1994
- Call sign meaning: Praise Radio Daily (former branding)

Technical information
- Licensing authority: FCC
- Facility ID: 66273
- Class: C1
- ERP: 83,000 watts
- HAAT: 194 meters (636 ft)
- Transmitter coordinates: 38°46′16″N 98°44′18″W

Links
- Public license information: Public file; LMS
- Webcast: Listen live
- Website: kprd.org

KPRD is a Christian radio station licensed to Hays, Kansas, broadcasting on 88.9 FM. It is owned by Great Plains Christian Radio Inc.

Prior to the switch to KJIL prorgamming, KPRD aired a mix of Christian contemporary music and Christian talk and teaching programs.

In 2026, Great Plains Christian Radio acquired stations from The Praise Network, including KPRD and KGCR. The stations flipped to the KJIL branding on June 1, 2026.

Older logo as KPRD branding.

== Repeaters ==
KPRD is also broadcast on the following repeaters throughout Midwest Kansas:

=== Full-power repeaters ===
Repeaters of KPRD
Call sign	Frequency	City of license	FID	ERP (W)	HAAT	Class	FCC info
KPBL	89.9 FM	Beloit	764000	100	23 m (75 ft)	A	LMS
KHLC	89.3 FM	Hill City	767451	4000	115 m (377 ft)	A	LMS
KPSR	89.3 FM	Smith Center	767452	330	83 m (272 ft)	A	LMS

=== Translators ===
Call sign	Frequency	City of license	FID	ERP (W)	HAAT	Class	FCC info
K202BP	88.3 FM	Bellaire, Kansas	68680	78	62 m (203 ft)	D	LMS
K216ED	91.1 FM	Phillipsburg, Kansas	90814	222	46 m (151 ft)	D	LMS
K241AN	96.1 FM	Pratt, Kansas	138793	250	72.3 m (237 ft)	D	LMS
K278AP	103.5 FM	Lewis, Kansas	138414	171	48.8 m (160 ft)	D	LMS
K297AI	107.3 FM	Hill City, Kansas	138413	170	81.1 m (266 ft)	D	LMS
