= J.E. Love =

American politician (1857–1918)

John E. Love
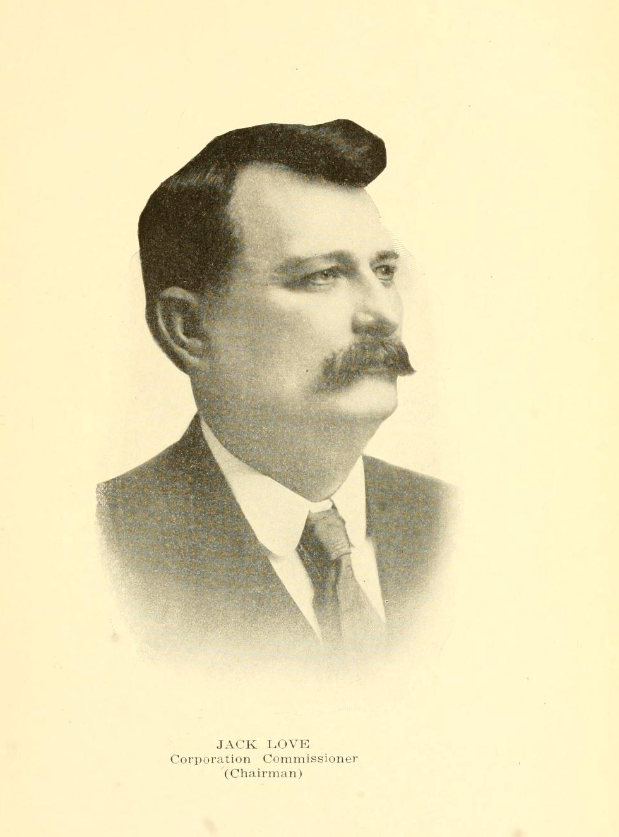

Oklahoma Corporation Commissioner
- In office November 16, 1907 – June 1, 1918
- Governor: Charles N. Haskell; Lee Cruce; Robert L. Williams
- Preceded by: Position established
- Succeeded by: Art L. Walker

Sheriff for Woodward County, Oklahoma Territory
- In office September 1893 – January 1, 1895
- Governor: William Cary Renfrow

Personal details
- Born: June 9, 1857 San Augustine County, Texas, U.S.
- Died: June 1, 1918 (aged 60) Mineral Wells, Texas, U.S.
- Party: Democratic Party

John "Jack" E. Love was an American politician who served as one of the first Oklahoma Corporation Commissioners from 1907 to 1918.

== Biography ==
John "Jack" E. Love Jr. was born in San Augustine County, Texas on June 9, 1857, to John E. Love Sr. and Susan V. Wood. He attended public school in Washington County, Texas and in Huntsville, Texas. He came to Oklahoma Territory during the Land Run of 1889 and eventually settled in Woodward County, Oklahoma. He served as the sheriff in that county from September 1893 to January 1, 1895. He ran for the Oklahoma Territorial Legislature in 1894, but lost the election.

=== Corporation Commission ===
He was elected to the Oklahoma Corporation Commission at statehood and voted chairman of the commission. He was reelected in 1912. He died on June 1, 1918, in Mineral Wells, Texas, and was a member of the Democratic Party.

== Electoral history ==
1907 Oklahoma Corporation Commission election
Party	Candidate	Votes	%	±%
Democratic	J. E. Love	132,762	54.9	New
Republican	John Jenson	99,386	41.1	New
Socialist	E.C. Deberry	9,608	3.9	New
Democratic gain from		Swing	N/A	

== Works cited ==
- Corden, Seth K.; Richards, William B. (1912). The Oklahoma Red Book. Oklahoma City, Okla.
- Williams, R. L. (December 1932). "Necrology: John E. (Jack) Love, Jr" (PDF). Chronicles of Oklahoma. 10 (4): 604–606.
