= Lewis, Kansas =

City in Edwards County, Kansas

- City
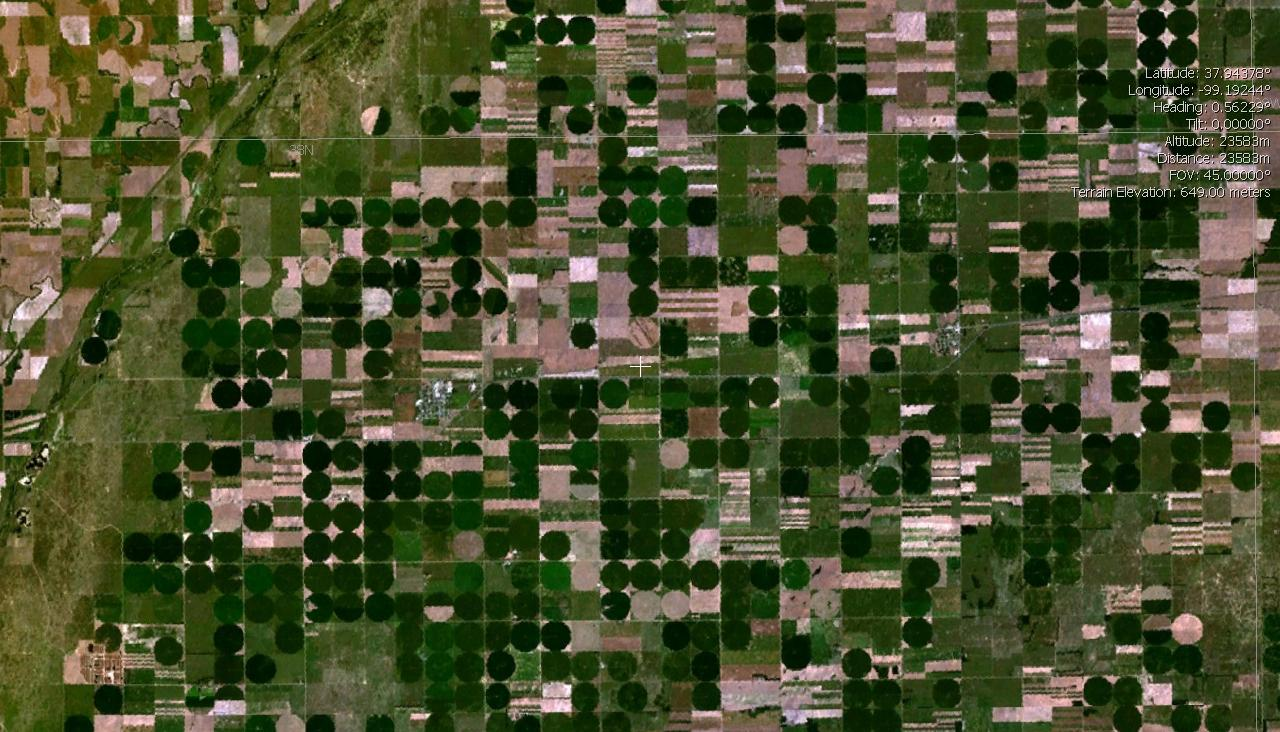
- Satellite view of Lewis and surrounding center-pivot irrigation farms (2005)

- Location within County and Kansas

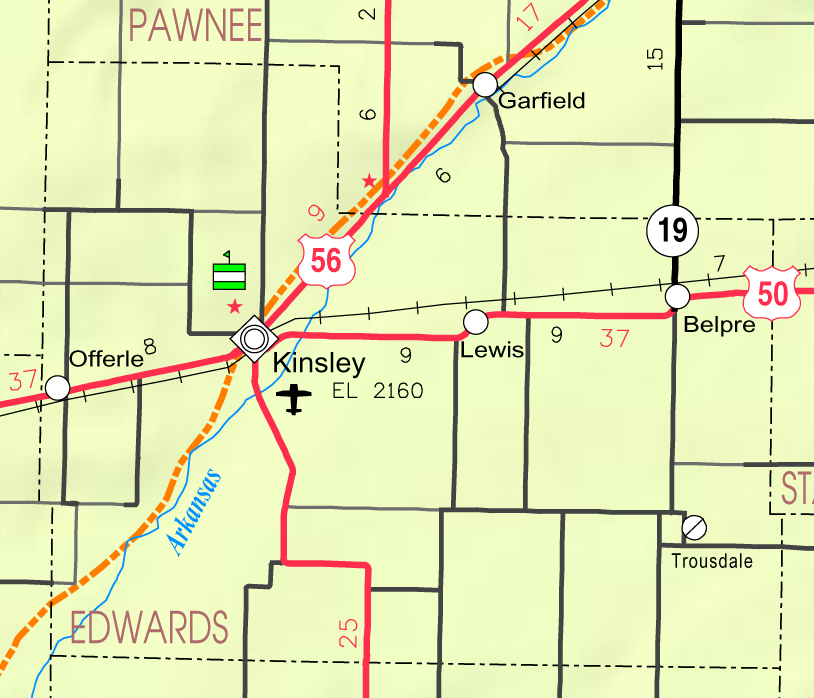
- KDOT map of Edwards County (legend)
- Coordinates: 37°56′13″N 99°15′17″W
- Country: United States
- State: Kansas
- County: Edwards
- Founded: 1885
- Incorporated: 1906
- Named for: M.M. Lewis

Area
  - Total: 0.31 sq mi (0.81 km^{2})
  - Land: 0.31 sq mi (0.81 km^{2})
  - Water: 0 sq mi (0.00 km^{2})
- Elevation: 2,146 ft (654 m)

Population (2020)
  - Total: 400
  - Density: 1,300/sq mi (490/km^{2})
- Time zone: UTC-6 (CST)
  - Summer (DST): UTC-5 (CDT)
- ZIP Code: 67552
- Area code: 620
- FIPS code: 20-39725
- GNIS ID: 2395691
- Website: lewis.krwa.net

Lewis is a city in Edwards County, Kansas, United States. As of the 2020 census, the population of the city was 400. It is located along Highway 50.

== History ==
Lewis was founded circa 1885. It was named for journalist M.M. Lewis.

The first post office in Lewis was established in November 1886.

== Geography ==
According to the United States Census Bureau, the city has a total area of 0.33 square miles (0.85 km^{2}), all land.

== Demographics ==
Historical population
Census	Pop.	Note	%±
1910	557		—
1920	439		−21.2%
1930	512		16.6%
1940	481		−6.1%
1950	475		−1.2%
1960	486		2.3%
1970	525		8.0%
1980	551		5.0%
1990	451		−18.1%
2000	486		7.8%
2010	451		−7.2%
2020	400		−11.3%
U.S. Decennial Census

=== 2020 census ===
The 2020 United States census counted 400 people, 175 households, and 123 families in Lewis. The population density was 1,269.8 per square mile (490.3/km^{2}). There were 199 housing units at an average density of 631.7 per square mile (243.9/km^{2}). The racial makeup was 74.25% (297) white or European American (53.5% non-Hispanic white), 0.0% (0) black or African-American, 1.0% (4) Native American or Alaska Native, 0.0% (0) Asian, 0.0% (0) Pacific Islander or Native Hawaiian, 15.75% (63) from other races, and 9.0% (36) from two or more races. Hispanic or Latino of any race was 43.75% (175) of the population.

Of the 175 households, 31.4% had children under the age of 18; 58.3% were married couples living together; 20.0% had a female householder with no spouse or partner present. 28.0% of households consisted of individuals and 9.1% had someone living alone who was 65 years of age or older. The average household size was 2.1 and the average family size was 2.6. The percent of those with a bachelor's degree or higher was estimated to be 9.5% of the population.

23.0% of the population was under the age of 18, 7.0% from 18 to 24, 21.5% from 25 to 44, 31.2% from 45 to 64, and 17.2% who were 65 years of age or older. The median age was 44.0 years. For every 100 females, there were 86.0 males. For every 100 females ages 18 and older, there were 94.9 males.

The 2016–2020 5-year American Community Survey estimates show that the median household income was $43,750 (with a margin of error of +/- $8,913) and the median family income was $80,341 (+/- $18,027). Males had a median income of $31,875 (+/- $9,777) versus $26,406 (+/- $7,311) for females. The median income for those above 16 years old was $29,432 (+/- $4,480). Approximately, 10.7% of families and 19.3% of the population were below the poverty line, including 34.8% of those under the age of 18 and 17.1% of those ages 65 or over.

=== 2010 census ===
As of the census of 2010, there were 451 people, 183 households, and 127 families residing in the city. The population density was 1,366.7 inhabitants per square mile (527.7/km^{2}). There were 221 housing units at an average density of 669.7 per square mile (258.6/km^{2}). The racial makeup of the city was 73.4% White, 1.3% African American, 1.3% Native American, 23.1% from other races, and 0.9% from two or more races. Hispanic or Latino of any race were 43.7% of the population.

There were 183 households, of which 31.1% had children under the age of 18 living with them, 56.3% were married couples living together, 7.1% had a female householder with no husband present, 6.0% had a male householder with no wife present, and 30.6% were non-families. 26.2% of all households were made up of individuals, and 13.1% had someone living alone who was 65 years of age or older. The average household size was 2.46 and the average family size was 2.99.

The median age in the city was 43.3 years. 23.7% of residents were under the age of 18; 6.8% were between the ages of 18 and 24; 23% were from 25 to 44; 28.6% were from 45 to 64; and 17.7% were 65 years of age or older. The gender makeup of the city was 52.1% male and 47.9% female.

== Education ==
The community is served by Lewis USD 502 public school district, and home to Lewis Elementary School.

Lewis High School was closed through school unification. The Lewis Spartans won the following Kansas State High School championships:

- 1954 Boys Track & Field – Class B
- 1971 Boys Basketball – Class 1A
- 1974 Football – Class 8-Man

== Media ==
- KPRD
