= KLSI (FM) =

- Mooreland, Oklahoma; United States
- Frequency: 107.3 MHz
- Branding: Classic Hits 107.3 KLSI

Programming
- Format: Classic hits

Ownership
- Owner: Classic Communications, Inc.
- Sister stations: KWFX, KWDQ, KSIW

History
- First air date: 2014

Technical information
- Licensing authority: FCC
- Facility ID: 183350
- Class: C2
- ERP: 30,000 watts
- HAAT: 193 meters (633 ft)
- Transmitter coordinates: 36°22′31″N 99°28′31″W

Links
- Public license information: Public file; LMS
- Website: KLSI Online

KLSI (107.3 FM) is a radio station licensed to Mooreland, Oklahoma, United States. The station is currently owned by Classic Communications, Inc.

== History ==
This station was assigned call sign KLSI on January 21, 2014. Before that, they were assigned as KXIJ on November 5, 2012.
