= Boiling Springs State Park =

Park in Oklahoma, United States

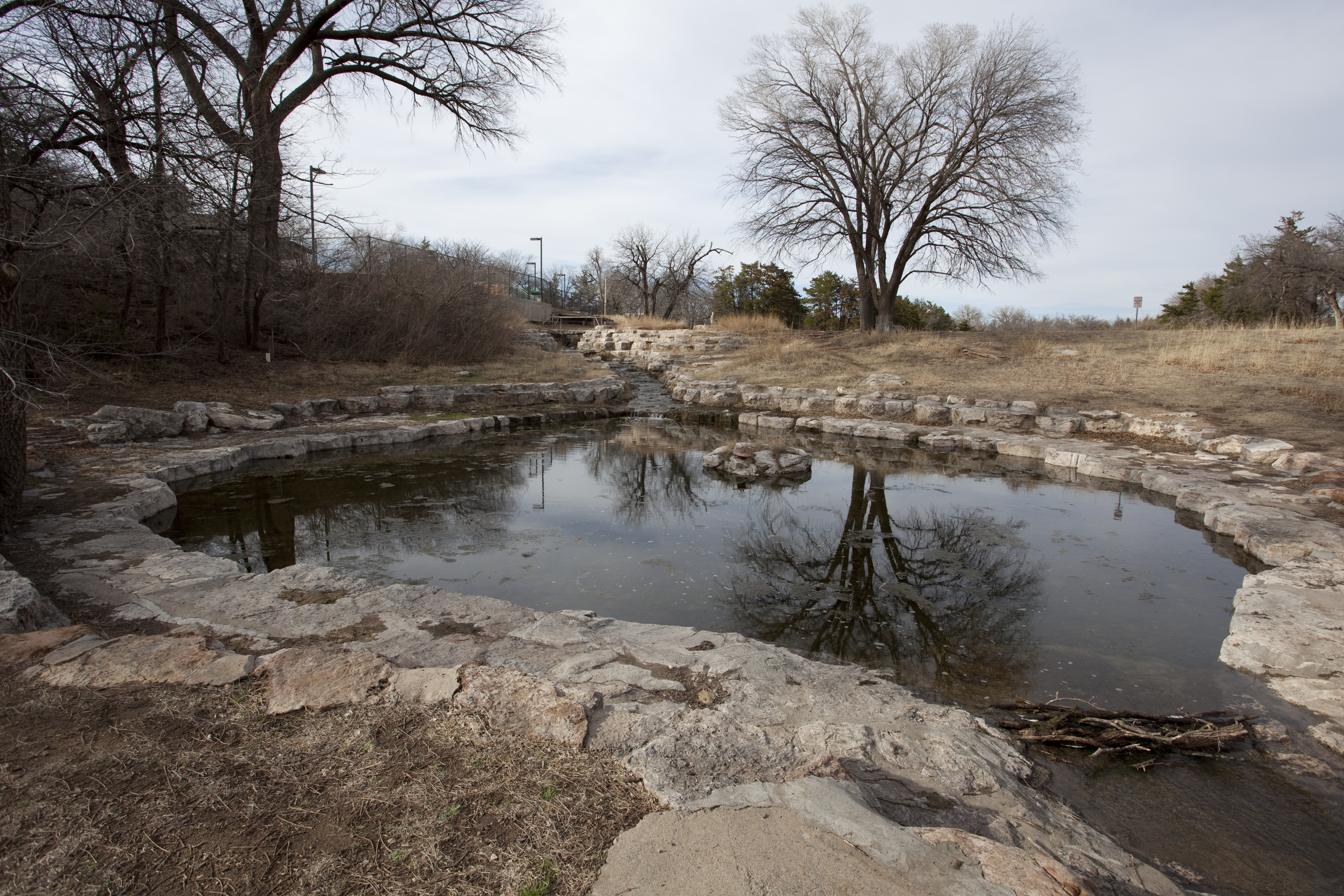
- Spring-fed pond in Boiling Springs State Park

- Location within Oklahoma Location within the United States
- Location: Woodward County, Oklahoma, United States
- Nearest city: Woodward
- Coordinates: 36.4555920°N 99.2989945°W
- Area: 820 acres (330 ha)
- Established: 1935
- Visitors: 283,261 (in FY 2016)
- Governing body: Oklahoma Tourism and Recreation Department
- Website: www.travelok.com/listings/view.profile/id.672

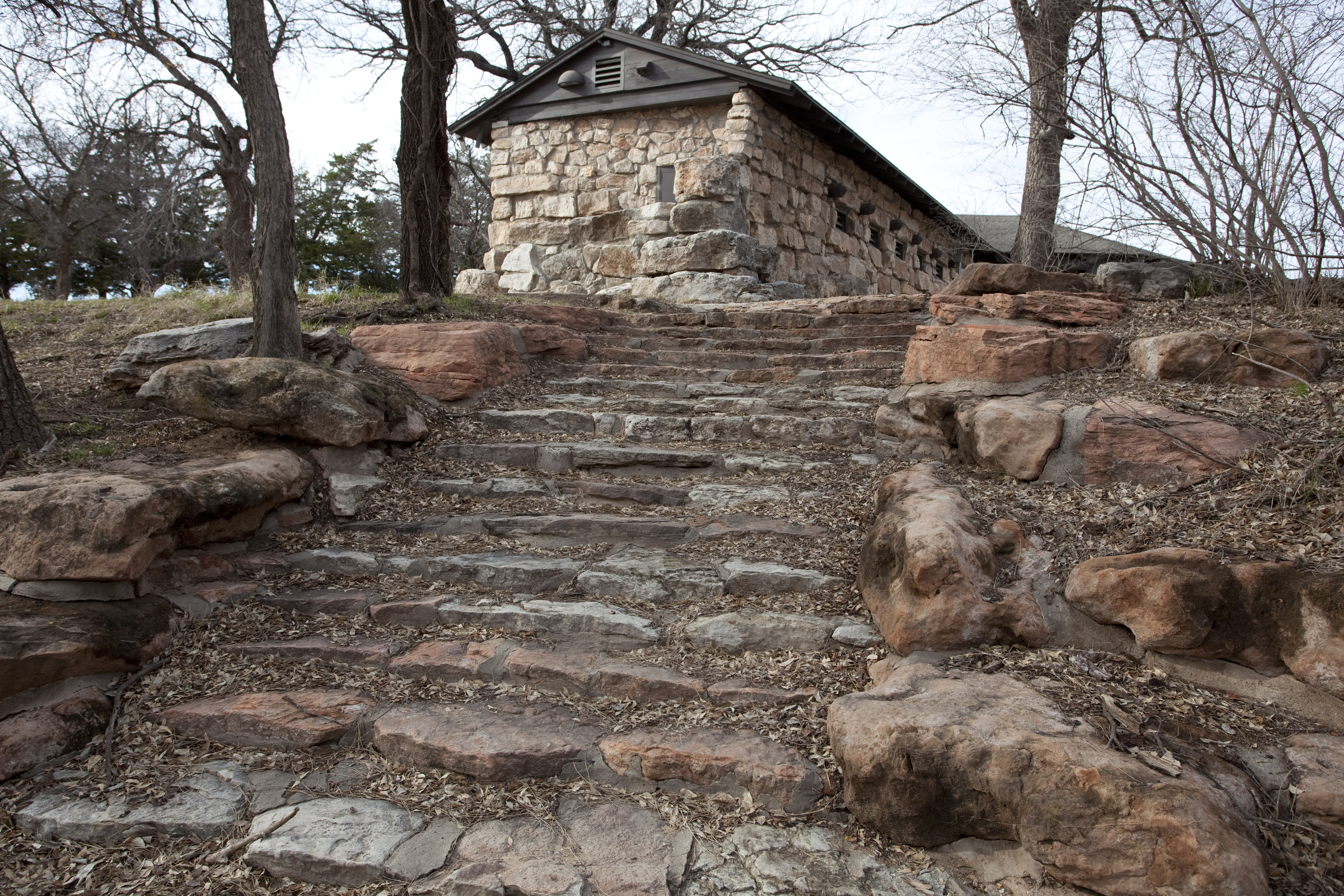
Stone stairway built in the 1930s by the CCC.

Boiling Springs State Park is a park built 6 miles (9.7 km) northeast of Woodward, Oklahoma, USA. It was built by the Civilian Conservation Corps in the 1930s.

== History ==
The park originated in the 1930s and was named for its springs. It was constructed as a park from the natural environment by the Civilian Conservation Corps. The park received its current name because its sandy-bottom springs appear to be boiling because of the inrush of subsurface water. The water temperature is actually far cooler than boiling.

Native Americans, Spanish explorers, and pioneers have visited and inhabited the land used for the park. Spanish expeditions from Mexico are believed to have visited the area as early as 1541 as part of Francisco Vázquez de Coronado’s search for the fabled "Seven Cities of Gold". In 1641, another Spanish explorer – Juan de Oñate - reported that several Indian encampments were found near the cool springs and heavy timber of the area. In 1823, U.S. Cavalry General Thomas James established a fur trading post here. Captain Nathan Boone, son of Daniel Boone, explored the vicinity of the park in 1843 on an expedition originating from Fort Gibson in eastern Oklahoma. Pioneers flocking into this area during the land run of 1893 found the location quite suitable for farming and hunting. In the early 1900s, area residents were just beginning to find and enjoy the recreation potential of this site.

In 1935, much of the land comprising the present day park was acquired by the City of Woodward to provide a place for recreation for its citizens and visitors. Although the local "swimming hole" was already present, the primary development work was accomplished by the young men of Company 2822 of the Civilian Conservation Corps (CCC) from 1935 to 1939. A monument stands in the main picnic area of the park in honor of the contributions made by these men in making the park a place for so many to enjoy.

== Geography ==
The park covers 820 acres and includes a small lake. It is located northeast of Woodward in a portion of Oklahoma known for a semi-arid climate and sparse vegetation. The park itself includes a forest of hackberry, walnut, soapberry (also called chinaberry), oak, and elm, attracting whitetail deer, wild turkey, raccoon, coyote, bobcat, beaver, badger, skunk, and opossum.

Northwestern Oklahoma includes three eco-regions known as the Sandstone Hills, Gypsum Hills and High Plains. Water rising rapidly to the surface from underground streams creates the appearance of "boiling" water on the springs.

== Amenities ==
The park offers cabins, RV sites and tent campsites. It has an 18-hole golf course and hiking trails. The park provides a variety of services and facilities for the enjoyment of more than 200,000 visitors each year. Two camping areas can accommodate everything from pup tents to modern recreational vehicles. Cabins are situated beside the park's 5-acre lake. Group camps, community building, and numerous picnic facilities are available here along with a host of other activities including hiking, camping, swimming, fishing, exercise walking and wildlife observation.

== Fees ==
To help fund a backlog of deferred maintenance and park improvements, the state implemented an entrance fee for this park and 21 others effective June 15, 2020. The fees, charged per vehicle, start at $10 per day for a single-day or $8 for residents with an Oklahoma license plate or Oklahoma tribal plate. Fees are waived for honorably discharged veterans and Oklahoma residents age 62 & older and their spouses. Passes good for three days or a week are also available; annual passes good at all 22 state parks charging fees are offered at a cost of $75 for out-of-state visitors or $60 for Oklahoma residents. The 22 parks are:

- Arrowhead Area at Lake Eufaula State Park
- Beavers Bend State Park
- Boiling Springs State Park
- Cherokee Landing State Park
- Fort Cobb State Park
- Foss State Park
- Honey Creek Area at Grand Lake State Park
- Great Plains State Park
- Great Salt Plains State Park
- Greenleaf State Park
- Keystone State Park
- Lake Eufaula State Park
- Lake Murray State Park
- Lake Texoma State Park
- Lake Thunderbird State Park
- Lake Wister State Park
- Natural Falls State Park
- Osage Hills State Park
- Robbers Cave State Park
- Sequoyah State Park
- Tenkiller State Park
- Twin Bridges Area at Grand Lake State Park

== See also ==
- Artesian Beach Park (Gage, Oklahoma)
- Salt Plains National Wildlife Refuge
- Great Salt Plains State Park
- Beaver Dunes Park
