= KMZE =

- Woodward, Oklahoma; United States
- Frequency: 92.3 MHz
- Branding: Z92

Programming
- Format: Talk radio

Ownership
- Owner: FM 92 Broadcasters, Inc.
- Sister stations: KWOX

History
- First air date: 1984
- Former frequencies: 92.1 MHz (1984–2015)

Technical information
- Licensing authority: FCC
- Facility ID: 21841
- Class: C1
- ERP: 11,000 watts
- HAAT: 368 meters (1,207 ft)
- Transmitter coordinates: 36.26833°N 99.44889°W

Links
- Public license information: Public file; LMS
- Webcast: Listen live
- Website: z92online.com

KMZE (92.3 FM) is a radio station licensed to Woodward, Oklahoma. The station broadcasts a talk radio format and is owned by FM 92 Broadcasters, Inc.

== History ==
FM92 signed on the air in the late 80's playing adult contemporary. FM92 later changed its name to "Z92". Z92 became the "Voice of the Boomers airing Woodward Boomer Sports. In 2012 Z92 switched formats to News/Talk airing Fox News/Talk radio programs. In August 2015 KMZE's frequency moved to 92.3 for better coverage area.

== Current programs ==
- Sports Nutz with Sean Gallagher and Colin Yee Weekdays 5-6pm - Local Sports Talk Show
- Woodward Boomer Coach Show - Wednesdays at 6-7pm Sports
- Heartland College Sports - Thursdays at 6-7pm
