= Woodward County, Oklahoma =

County in Oklahoma, United States

- County
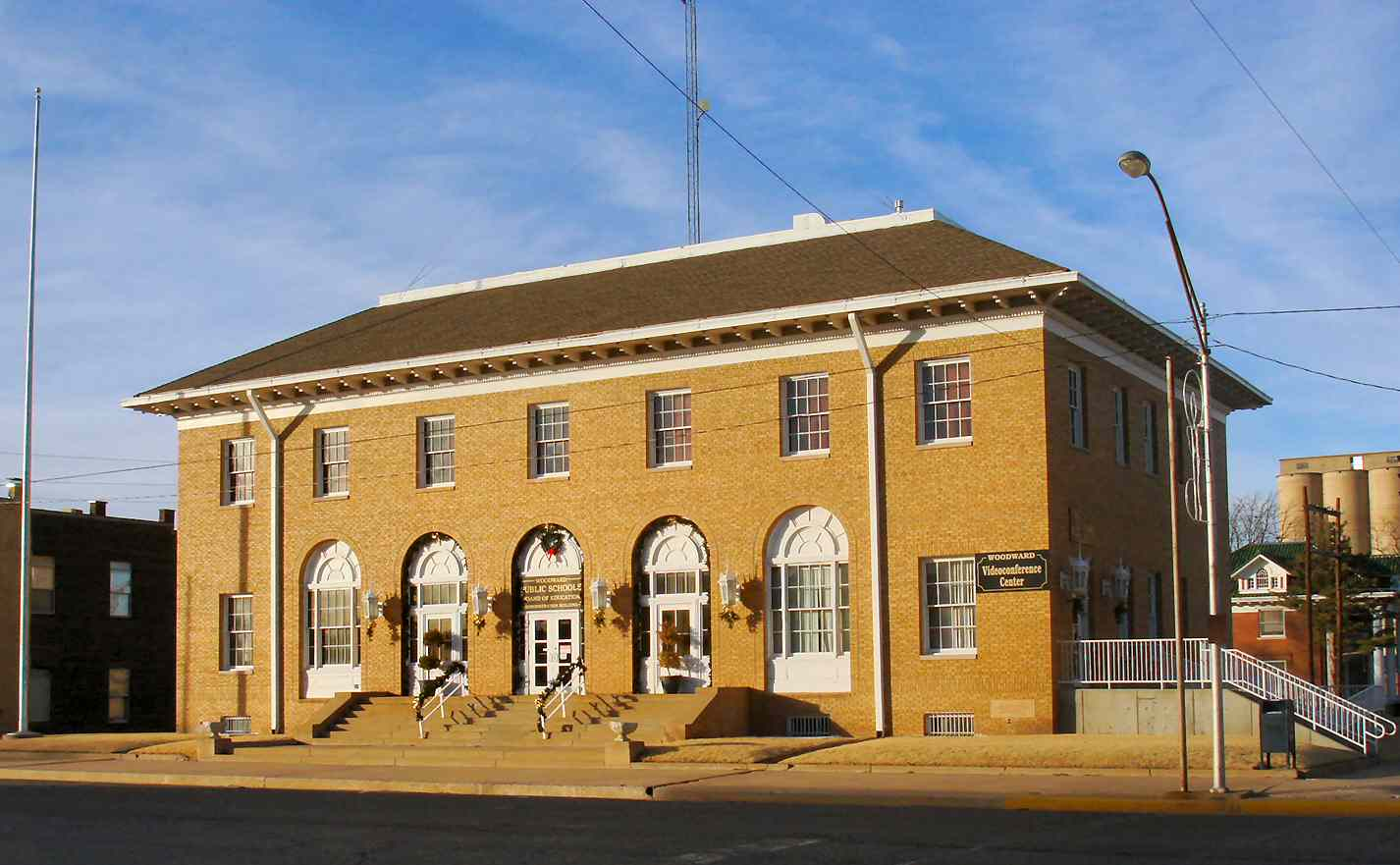
- Woodward Federal Courthouse and Post Office

- Location within the U.S. state of Oklahoma
- Coordinates: 36°25′N 99°16′W
- Country: United States
- State: Oklahoma
- Founded: 1893
- Seat: Woodward
- Largest city: Woodward

Area
  - Total: 1,246 sq mi (3,230 km^{2})
  - Land: 1,242 sq mi (3,220 km^{2})
  - Water: 3.7 sq mi (9.6 km^{2}) 0.3%

Population (2020)
  - Total: 20,470
  - Estimate (2025): 19,827 ▼
  - Density: 16.48/sq mi (6.364/km^{2})
- Time zone: UTC−6 (Central)
  - Summer (DST): UTC−5 (CDT)
- Congressional district: 3rd
- Website: woodward.okcounties.org

Woodward County is a county located in the U.S. state of Oklahoma. As of the 2020 census, the population was 20,470. Its county seat is Woodward.

Woodward County comprises the Woodward, OK micropolitan statistical area.

Woodward County was originally known as "N" County and was composed of present-day Woodward County and portions of Harper, Ellis, and Woods County. Before its division at statehood, Woodward County, then 60 miles square, was the westernmost county of the Cherokee Outlet and adjoined Texas and the Oklahoma Panhandle on the west and Kansas on the north. Political pressure applied by William H. Murray during Oklahoma's Constitutional Convention resulted in the reduction of the size of Woodward County to its present boundaries. It is unknown exactly whom the county (and the town) is named after, but the two leading candidates are Brinton W. Woodward, a Santa Fe railway director, or Richard Woodward, a buffalo hunter.

== History ==
In the 19th century, the county was part of a well-used military transportation corridor that was important to frontier defense. In 1868, Camp Supply, was established as a depot leading up to a campaign against the Cheyenne. From 1876 through the 1880s massive herds of cattle passed through the southwestern corner of the county along the Great Western Trail from Texas to Kansas.

The Southern Kansas Railway, later acquired by the Atchison, Topeka and Santa Fe Railway built a line southwest from Kiowa, Kansas, through the region and into Texas during 1886–1887. It began the town of Woodward where the railroad crossed the military road. The Wichita Falls and Northwestern Railway, controlled by the Missouri, Kansas and Texas Railway, constructed a north–south line from Elk City through Sharon, Woodward, and the town of Fort Supply to Forgan, in Beaver County, in 1911–12.

In September 1893, when the Cherokee Outlet opened for non-Indian settlement, Woodward County was created as County N in Oklahoma Territory, though its area was much larger than at present. In a November 6, 1894, election, the county was renamed Woodward County. Statehood in 1907 redrew the boundaries of the county, while the remainder was given to the present Harper, Ellis and Woods counties.

== Geography ==
According to the U.S. Census Bureau, the county has a total area of 1,246 square miles (3,230 km^{2}), of which 1,242 square miles (3,220 km^{2}) is land and 3.7 square miles (9.6 km^{2}) (0.3%) is water. The Cimarron River forms part of the northern boundary and drains the northwestern section of the county. The North Canadian River flows through the county from the northwest to the southeast. The southern part of the county drains into the Canadian River. Fort Supply Lake, on Wolf Creek, lies in Woodward County.

The county is part of the Osage Plains and lies within the Western Red Prairies physiographic region and Gypsum Hills subregion. There are gypsum hills in the eastern and northwestern parts of the county. Protected areas in the county are Alabaster Caverns State Park and Boiling Springs State Park.

=== Adjacent counties ===
- Dewey County (south)
- Ellis County (west)
- Harper County (northwest)
- Major County (east)
- Woods County (northeast)

== Demographics ==
Historical population
Census	Pop.	Note	%±
1910	16,592		—
1920	14,663		−11.6%
1930	15,844		8.1%
1940	16,270		2.7%
1950	14,383		−11.6%
1960	13,902		−3.3%
1970	15,537		11.8%
1980	21,172		36.3%
1990	18,976		−10.4%
2000	18,486		−2.6%
2010	20,081		8.6%
2020	20,470		1.9%
2025 (est.)	19,827	▼	−3.1%
U.S. Decennial Census; 1790-1960 1900-1990; 1990-2000 2010

=== 2020 census ===
As of the 2020 census, the county had a population of 20,470. Of the residents, 24.2% were under the age of 18 and 16.0% were 65 years of age or older; the median age was 38.0 years. For every 100 females there were 111.5 males, and for every 100 females age 18 and over there were 114.4 males.

The racial makeup of the county was 78.8% White, 1.7% Black or African American, 3.1% American Indian and Alaska Native, 0.6% Asian, 6.0% from some other race, and 9.7% from two or more races. Hispanic or Latino residents of any race comprised 14.7% of the population.

There were 7,728 households in the county, of which 33.0% had children under the age of 18 living with them and 23.0% had a female householder with no spouse or partner present. About 28.2% of all households were made up of individuals and 12.3% had someone living alone who was 65 years of age or older.

There were 9,386 housing units, of which 17.7% were vacant. Among occupied housing units, 68.6% were owner-occupied and 31.4% were renter-occupied. The homeowner vacancy rate was 3.3% and the rental vacancy rate was 21.0%.

=== 2010 census ===
As of the 2010 United States census, there were 20,081 people and 5,106 families residing in the county. The population density was 16.1 people per square mile (6.2 people/km^{2}). There were 8,838 housing units at an average density of 7.1 units per square mile (2.7/km^{2}). The racial makeup of the county was 86.7% white, 1.6% black or African American, 2.8% Native American, 0.6% Asian, less than 0.1% Pacific Islander, 5.6% from other races, and 2.6% from two or more races. 10.6% of the population were Hispanic or Latino of any race.

In 2010, there were 7,654 households in the county, out of which 2,322 (30.3%) included children under the age of 18, 4,132 (54%) were married couples living together, 8.5% had a female householder with no husband present, and 32% were non-families. Individuals living alone accounted for 28% of households. The average household size was 2.46 and the average family size was 3. In the county, the population was spread out, with 24.3% under the age of 18, 8.5% from 18 to 24, 27.1% from 25 to 44, 25.9% from 45 to 64, and 14.2% who were 65 years of age or older. The median age was 37 years. For every 100 females there were 79 males. For every 100 females age 18 and over, there were 89 males.

The median income for a household in the county was $51,087, and the median income for a family was $60,684. Males had a median income of $48,228 versus $26,993 for females. The per capita income for the county was $24,735. About 6.5% of families and 12.4% of the population were below the poverty line, including 16% of those under age 18 and 11.8% of those age 65 or over.

== Politics ==
Voter Registration and Party Enrollment as of June 30, 2023
Party	Number of Voters	Percentage
Democratic	1,596	14.57%
Republican	7,662	69.93%
Others	1,699	15.51%
Total	10,957	100%

United States presidential election results for Woodward County, Oklahoma
Year	Republican		Democratic		Third party(ies)	
Year	No.	%	No.	%	No.	%
1908	1,614	48.88%	1,308	39.61%	380	11.51%
1912	1,403	45.57%	1,083	35.17%	593	19.26%
1916	1,092	37.35%	1,130	38.65%	702	24.01%
1920	2,492	59.07%	1,437	34.06%	290	6.87%
1924	1,831	45.64%	1,418	35.34%	763	19.02%
1928	3,188	69.06%	1,347	29.18%	81	1.75%
1932	1,614	28.81%	3,988	71.19%	0	0.00%
1936	2,430	41.67%	3,361	57.64%	40	0.69%
1940	3,403	54.51%	2,806	44.95%	34	0.54%
1944	3,055	58.47%	2,152	41.19%	18	0.34%
1948	2,391	52.31%	2,180	47.69%	0	0.00%
1952	4,463	72.53%	1,690	27.47%	0	0.00%
1956	3,405	67.79%	1,618	32.21%	0	0.00%
1960	4,185	73.78%	1,487	26.22%	0	0.00%
1964	3,094	51.33%	2,934	48.67%	0	0.00%
1968	3,748	64.01%	1,444	24.66%	663	11.32%
1972	5,350	80.05%	1,104	16.52%	229	3.43%
1976	3,782	56.52%	2,807	41.95%	102	1.52%
1980	5,318	72.96%	1,703	23.36%	268	3.68%
1984	6,376	79.08%	1,647	20.43%	40	0.50%
1988	4,996	66.68%	2,408	32.14%	89	1.19%
1992	4,006	46.99%	2,063	24.20%	2,457	28.82%
1996	4,093	54.59%	2,403	32.05%	1,002	13.36%
2000	5,067	71.37%	1,950	27.46%	83	1.17%
2004	6,193	80.94%	1,458	19.06%	0	0.00%
2008	6,404	82.59%	1,350	17.41%	0	0.00%
2012	5,945	83.99%	1,133	16.01%	0	0.00%
2016	6,347	83.57%	873	11.49%	375	4.94%
2020	6,611	84.92%	1,005	12.91%	169	2.17%
2024	6,231	85.22%	967	13.22%	114	1.56%

In 2015, surveys identified Woodward County as one of the most climate science doubting counties in the United States.

== Economy ==
Agriculture and cattle production have been very important to the county income since before statehood. Grains, especially wheat, were the largest crop. However, broomcorn grew abundantly. Broom factories operated in Woodward and Mooreland. Castor beans, grown during World War I, were processed into castor oil, which was used as a lubricant for aircraft engines.

Extractive industries became relatively more important during the 1920s, while agriculture began to decline. Mineral production included salt, bentonite and petroleum. Natural gas production began in 1956. In 1975, a plant was built near Woodward to extract iodine from oil field brine. It soon supplied 14% of the nation's supply of the chemical.

== Communities ==
=== City ===
- Woodward (county seat)

=== Towns ===
- Fort Supply
- Mooreland
- Mutual
- Sharon

=== Unincorporated communities ===
- Belva
- Cedardale
- Curtis
- Gerlach
- Keenan
- Quinlan (also a census-designated place)
- Richmond
- Tangier

== Transportation ==
=== Major highways ===
- US 183
- US 270 / SH-3
- US 412
- SH-15
- SH-34
  - SH-34C
- SH-50
  - SH-50A
  - SH-50B

== NRHP sites ==
Woodward county has the following site on the National Register of Historic Places

- Fort Supply
  - Fort Supply Historic District
- Woodward
  - L. L. Stine House
  - Woodward Crystal Beach Park
  - Woodward Federal Courthouse and Post Office
