= KZUH =

- Minneapolis, Kansas; United States
- Broadcast area: Salina-Manhattan
- Frequency: 92.7 MHz
- Branding: KJIL

Programming
- Format: Christian adult contemporary

Ownership
- Owner: Great Plains Christian Radio, Inc.

History
- Former call signs: KILS
- Call sign meaning: K ZUH sounds like ZOO (former branding)

Technical information
- Licensing authority: FCC
- Facility ID: 37127
- Class: C2
- ERP: 50,000 watts
- HAAT: 142 meters (466 ft)
- Transmitter coordinates: 39°00′52.0″N 97°37′43.1″W

Links
- Public license information: Public file; LMS
- Website: kjil.com

KZUH (92.7 FM) is a radio station licensed to Minneapolis, Kansas, United States, the station serves the Salina-Manhattan area. The station is currently owned by Great Plains Christian Radio, Inc.

== History ==
KZUH signed on as KILS on February 24, 1993, with a country format. At the time, KILS was owned by Lesso, Inc., which was founded by longtime Kansas broadcaster Larry Steckline. Goodstar Broadcasting bought the station in March 1997. On August 20, 1997, KILS began stunting with a loop of "I Love Rock and Roll" by Joan Jett & the Blackhearts; around Labor Day weekend, the station flipped to classic rock as "92.7 The Zoo". At this time, the station's morning show began to grow and become popular; "The Morning Zoo" with Phill & JJ was ranked #1 in ratings.

In 2001, Goodstar sold the station to Waitt Media, who kept the "Zoo" branding. Waitt merged with NRG Media in 2006. Rocking M Radio purchased the station in 2007 and changed the call sign to KZUH.

In February 2009, the station flipped to sports talk as "92.7 The Fan." The station was an affiliate of Sporting News Radio, and then ESPN Radio. This format was well-liked among listeners, but due to low advertising revenues, the station made another change.

On August 12, 2010, at 5 p.m., the station flipped to Top 40/CHR as "92.7 The New Zoo." Initially, the station carried the satellite-fed "Hits Now!" format from Dial Global. A few months later, the station dropped the satellite feed and switched to a locally oriented direction with DJ's. However, in the Fall of 2012, the station switched back to Westwood One/Dial Global. In Fall of 2013, KZUH-FM became the #1 most listened to station in Saline County by males/females ages 18–49.

In June 2012, the station became an affiliate for the syndicated "Sunday Nite Slow Jams", hosted by R. Dub. The station also aired the "Hot Mix", a weekend dance mix, on Saturdays from 8 p.m. to Midnight.

The station aired local Minneapolis high school games.

In October 2020, newly formed company Meridian Media, LLC began operating KZUH under a local marketing agreement, while remaining under Rocking M ownership.

As part of owner Rocking M Media's bankruptcy reorganization, in which 12 stations in Kansas would be auctioned off to new owners, it was announced on October 31, 2022, that Great Plains Christian Radio, owner of KJRL in Herington, was the winning bidder for KZUH for $280,000. While the bankruptcy court had already approved the purchase, the sale would officially be filed with the FCC on January 26, 2023. Upon the sale's approval on April 28, KJRL's Contemporary Christian music/talk and teaching format, which has been relayed in the Salina area on translator K243BD (96.5 FM), was moved to KZUH. Not long after, Great Plains announced that K243BD would be sold to Ad Astra Per Aspera Broadcasting, who would relocate the translator to Lindsborg, change frequencies to 96.3 FM, and relay McPherson station KMCP (1540 AM).
