= KGCR =

- Goodland, Kansas; United States
- Broadcast area: Northwestern Kansas
- Frequency: 107.7 MHz
- Branding: KJIL

Programming
- Format: Christian radio

Ownership
- Owner: Great Plains Christian Radio Inc.
- Sister stations: KPRD, KJIL

History
- First air date: March 1, 1988

Technical information
- Licensing authority: FCC
- Facility ID: 24987
- Class: C1
- ERP: 100,000 watts
- HAAT: 136 meters (446 ft)
- Transmitter coordinates: 39°22′02″N 101°26′46″W

Links
- Public license information: Public file; LMS
- Webcast: Listen online
- Website: kgcr.org

Former KGCR logo.

Former Classic KGCR logo.

KGCR is a Christian radio station broadcasting on 107.7 FM, licensed to Goodland, Kansas, serving Northwestern Kansas. The station is owned by Great Plains Christian Radio Inc.

KGCR began broadcasting March 1, 1988. The station was donated to The Praise Network in 1998. In 2026, Great Plains Christian Radio acquired stations from The Praise Network, including KPRD and KGCR. The stations flipped to the KJIL branding on June 1, 2026.

The station's format prior to the acquisition consisted of Christian adult contemporary, along with Christian talk and teaching programs. Christian talk and teaching programs heard on KGCR include; Revive Our Hearts with Nancy Leigh DeMoss, Focus on the Family, Insight for Living with Chuck Swindoll, and Joni and Friends. KGCR also broadcast "Classic KGCR" on a digital sub-carrier, which plays traditional Christian hymns and lite southern gospel, along with Christian talk and teaching programs. Some of the Classic KGCR stations switched to KHYM on June 1, 2026.

== Translators ==
KGCR is also heard on KZCK in Colby, Kansas, KGCD in Wray, Colorado, as well as translators in Cheyenne Wells, Colorado, and McCook, Nebraska.

Call sign	Frequency	City of license	FID	ERP (W)	HAAT	Class	FCC info
KGCD	90.3 FM	Wray, Colorado	172509	430	77 m (253 ft)	A	LMS
K203DL	88.5 FM	Cheyenne Wells, Colorado	122132	236	24.5 m (80 ft)	D	LMS
K237DV	95.3 FM	McCook, Nebraska	147652	205	70.5 m (231 ft)	D	LMS

=== Classic KGCR ===
Call sign	Frequency	City of license	FID	ERP (W)	HAAT	Class	FCC info
KZCK	88.1 FM	Colby, Kansas	175547	2000	109 m (358 ft)	A	LMS
K214AU	90.7 FM	Sharon Springs, Kansas	33373	180	46 m (151 ft)	D	LMS
