= Woodward Federal Courthouse and Post Office =

- U.S. National Register of Historic Places
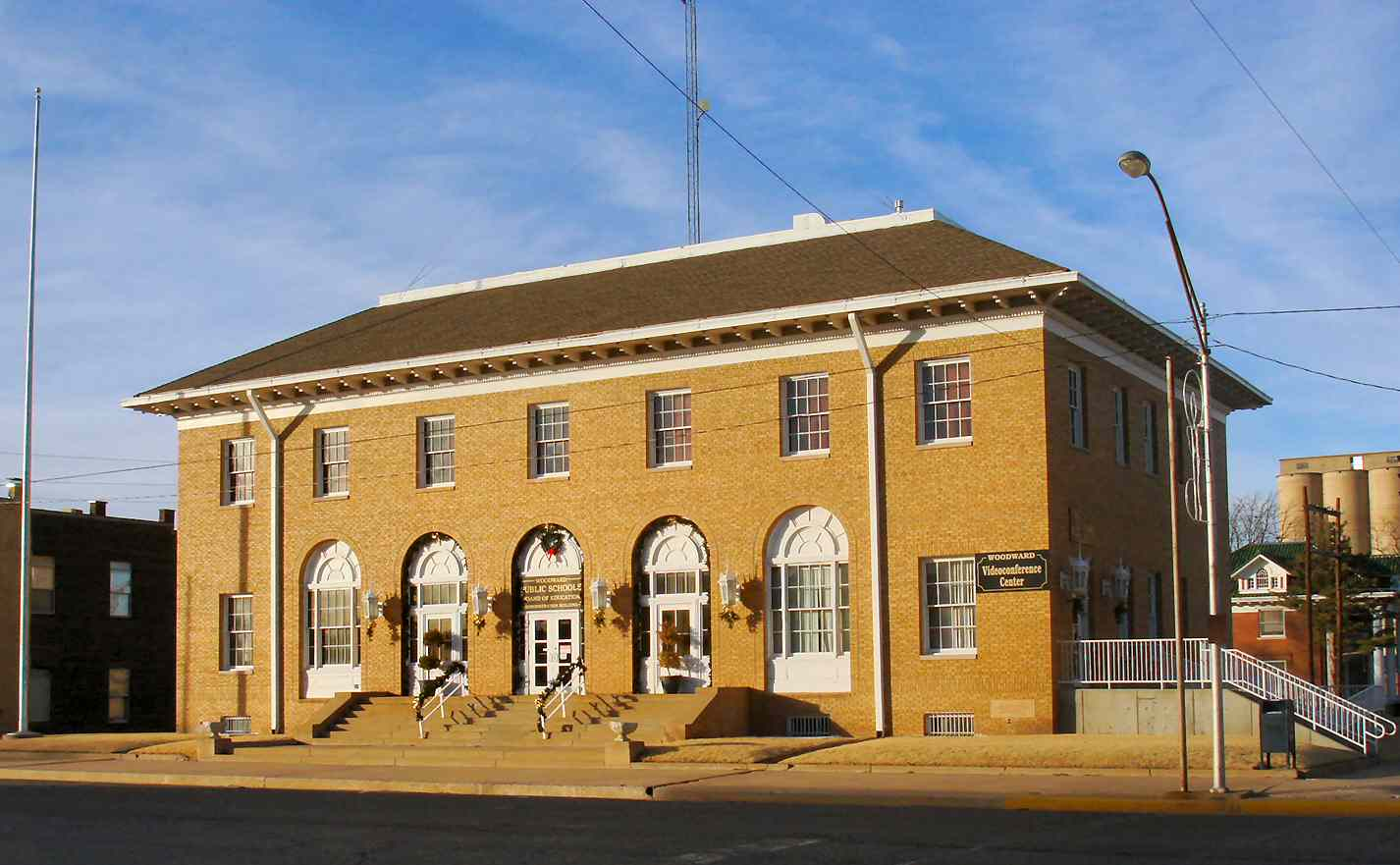

- Location within Oklahoma Location within the United States
- Location: 1023 10th St., Woodward, Oklahoma
- Coordinates: 36°26′10″N 99°23′31″W
- Area: 1 acre (0.40 ha)
- Built: 1921
- Built by: Henry & Hatfield
- Architect: Wetmore, James A.
- Architectural style: Renaissance Revival
- NRHP reference No.: 07000915
- Added to NRHP: September 6, 2007

The Woodward Federal Courthouse and Post Office in Woodward, Oklahoma is a Renaissance Revival-style building that was built in 1921. Also known as Woodward Public Schools Administration Building it historically served as a post office and as a courthouse of the United States District Court for the Western District of Oklahoma. It was listed on the National Register of Historic Places in 2007.

Its construction in Woodward was locally held to be important as a signal of success of the town, for its obtaining the Federal spending and the stately building.
