= L. L. Stine House =

Historic house in Oklahoma, United States

- L. L. Stein House
- U.S. National Register of Historic Places
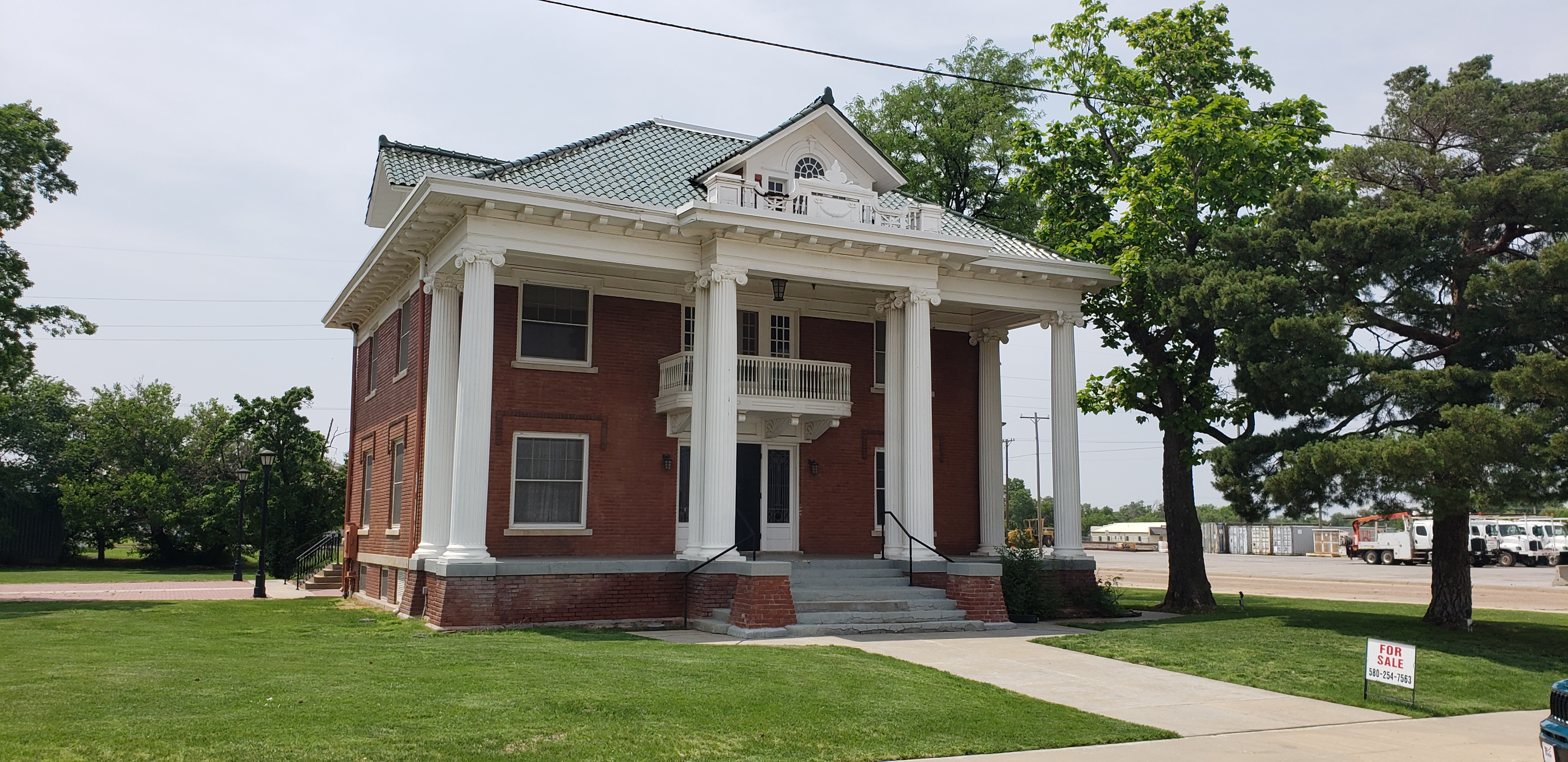

- Location within Oklahoma Location within the United States
- Location: 1001 10th St., Woodward, Oklahoma
- Coordinates: 36°26′12″N 99°23′35″W
- Area: less than one acre
- Built: 1918
- Architectural style: Classical Revival
- MPS: Woodward MRA
- NRHP reference No.: 83004225
- Added to NRHP: October 7, 1983

The L. L. Stine House, or L.L. Stein House, is a historic house in Woodward, Oklahoma.

It has also been known as the Bradbury Home. It was listed on the National Register of Historic Places in 1983 as "L.L. Stein House".

It was deemed significant for its association with L.L. Stein, who was one of the original 5,000 or so land-run settlers of Woodward and was a prominent banker, and for it being one of few surviving homes built by pioneer settlers in the town, and for being the only large Classical Revival style building in Woodward.

The House was built in 1916 by architect U. G. Charles of Wichita, Kansas for L. L. Stine, an early banker in Woodward. The house is a three-story brick which was picked out of the Sears Catalog. Stine was the owner of Woodward's First National Bank which was built on the corner of 8th and Main in 1901. Fifteen years later he built the elaborate mansion that is known today as the Stine-Bradbury House.

Mr. L.L. Stine & his wife separated, There was a small fire in the house, so Mr. Stine moved into a smaller house next to the Large house. The house was purchased after a small fire by Mr. & Mrs. Harold B. Bradbury in 1935 with their Daughter Mary Vivian and 10-year-old son Harold Madison.

H.B. Bradbury owned the Bradbury Produce Company. Mr. & Mrs. H.B. Bradbury cared for Mr. Stine until he passed. The Bradburys had purchased a few items from the Stine Auction. Both Mr. & Mrs. H.B. Bradbury died in the house. Their Son, Harold Madison, Wife Maudie Lea Bradbury & two daughters lived in the house while caring for Mr. H.B. Bradbury before he died. The House is a Classical Revival building and is the only large Classical Revival building in Woodward. The house was listed on the National Register of Historic Places on October 7, 1983, by Mr. & Mrs. H.M. Bradbury, remained in their family until 1994. It is now owned by the Great Plains Preservation and Development Foundation and is used as a venue for receptions, weddings, and other community events.
