= Mooreland, Oklahoma =

- Town
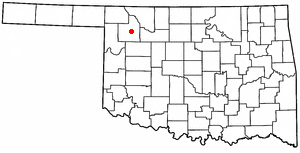
- Location of Mooreland, Oklahoma
- Coordinates: 36°26′16″N 99°12′17″W
- Country: United States
- State: Oklahoma
- County: Woodward

Area
  - Total: 0.88 sq mi (2.28 km^{2})
  - Land: 0.88 sq mi (2.28 km^{2})
  - Water: 0 sq mi (0.00 km^{2})
- Elevation: 1,890 ft (580 m)

Population (2020)
  - Total: 1,178
  - Density: 1,335.6/sq mi (515.67/km^{2})
- Time zone: UTC-6 (Central (CST))
  - Summer (DST): UTC-5 (CDT)
- ZIP code: 73852
- Area code: 580
- FIPS code: 40-49250
- GNIS feature ID: 2413012

Mooreland is a town in Woodward County, Oklahoma, United States, 10 miles (16 km) east of the city of Woodward, the county seat. As of the 2020 census, Mooreland had a population of 1,178. Mooreland lies in a valley approximately 5 miles (8.0 km) north of the North Canadian River. This area of shallow-water land lies at an altitude of 1,900 feet (580 m).

== History ==
The Southern Kansas Railway, later the Atchison, Topeka and Santa Fe Railway, constructed a line in 1886/1887 and then furnished an accessible shipping point for the region. After the opening of Cherokee Outlet in 1893, homesteaders made efforts that resulted in the town of Mooreland.

Prosperous area resident J. H. Dail joined F. J. Knittel, John J. Bouquot, John E. Moseley, and William M. Holmes in founding the Mooreland Town Company. They and others realized the agricultural potential of the area and the possibility of immense crop production.

Mooreland Town Company founded the town of 'Dail City, named for its chief proprietor, in 1901. The company purchased land from the Knittel homestead and the W. F. Jones homestead for the platting of the original town site. Others helpful in development of Mooreland included John T. Davis, C. L. Lambert, J. C. Krouth, and John Arnold. Residents quickly petitioned the federal government for a post office. Because of already another "Dail" in Oklahoma Territory, the government denied the request. Residents then selected the name "Moreland." An error occurred when an extra "o" inadvertently crept into the name on the official plat and registration.

In March 1902, the government established the first Mooreland post office with F. M. Jones as first appointed postmaster. Mooreland Leader newspaper began publishing in 1903 and continues today.

The economy always depended on farming, primarily wheat and grain. An agricultural service center within a few years of its founding, the community supported four stores, two liveries, three grain elevators, a feed mill, saloons, restaurants, hotels, and medical personnel.

A minor oil boom occurred around the time of World War I. Mooreland began smaller than Woodward, Curtis, and Quinlan, Oklahoma. Curtis and Quinlan withered, but Mooreland and Woodward continued to prosper.

Mooreland celebrated its centennial in 2001 with the publication of a history book. The community includes a school district, six churches, a newspaper, an airport, farmers cooperative and elevators, and several dozen retail and service businesses necessary for survival of the town. Primary employers include Mooreland Public Schools, Western Farmers Electric Cooperative, and Prather Cues (a pool cue stick company).

== Geography ==
According to the United States Census Bureau, the town has a total area of 0.8 square miles (2.1 km^{2}), all land.

== Demographics ==
Historical population
Census	Pop.	Note	%±
1910	493		—
1920	592		20.1%
1930	706		19.3%
1940	811		14.9%
1950	867		6.9%
1960	871		0.5%
1970	1,196		37.3%
1980	1,383		15.6%
1990	1,157		−16.3%
2000	1,226		6.0%
2010	1,190		−2.9%
2020	1,178		−1.0%
U.S. Decennial Census

=== 2020 census ===
As of the 2020 census, Mooreland had a population of 1,178. The median age was 36.1 years. 28.7% of residents were under the age of 18 and 18.4% of residents were 65 years of age or older. For every 100 females there were 85.5 males, and for every 100 females age 18 and over there were 88.8 males age 18 and over.

0.0% of residents lived in urban areas, while 100.0% lived in rural areas.

There were 460 households in Mooreland, of which 37.2% had children under the age of 18 living in them. Of all households, 48.9% were married-couple households, 20.0% were households with a male householder and no spouse or partner present, and 23.5% were households with a female householder and no spouse or partner present. About 26.3% of all households were made up of individuals and 13.4% had someone living alone who was 65 years of age or older.

There were 582 housing units, of which 21.0% were vacant. The homeowner vacancy rate was 5.6% and the rental vacancy rate was 22.2%.

Racial composition as of the 2020 census
Race	Number	Percent
White	993	84.3%
Black or African American	1	0.1%
American Indian and Alaska Native	30	2.5%
Asian	0	0.0%
Native Hawaiian and Other Pacific Islander	2	0.2%
Some other race	28	2.4%
Two or more races	124	10.5%
Hispanic or Latino (of any race)	119	10.1%

=== 2000 census ===
As of the census of 2000, there were 1,226 people, 477 households, and 336 families residing in the town. The population density was 1,484.9 inhabitants per square mile (573.3/km^{2}). There were 554 housing units at an average density of 671.0 per square mile (259.1/km^{2}). The racial makeup of the town was 95.02% White, 2.37% Native American, 0.08% Asian, 1.88% from other races, and 0.65% from two or more races. Latino or Latino of any race were 3.83% of the population.

There were 477 households, out of which 34.2% had children under the age of 18 living with them, 56.8% were married couples living together, 10.7% had a female householder with no husband present, and 29.4% were non-families. 27.5% of all households were made up of individuals, and 15.7% had someone living alone who was 65 years of age or older. The average household size was 2.47 and the average family size was 2.99.

In the town, the population was spread out, with 27.6% under the age of 18, 5.7% from 18 to 24, 23.8% from 25 to 44, 20.9% from 45 to 64, and 22.0% who were 65 years of age or older. The median age was 40 years. For every 100 females, there were 82.2 males. For every 100 females age 18 and over, there were 80.9 males.

The median income for a household in the town was $31,680, and the median income for a family was $38,654. Males had a median income of $28,906 versus $21,574 for females. The per capita income for the town was $16,657. About 9.0% of families and 10.4% of the population were below the poverty line, including 15.0% of those under age 18 and 2.7% of those age 65 or over.

== Notable person ==
- Troy Ruttman, Indianapolis 500 winner 1952, at age 22 the youngest winner of the Indy 500.
