= KWFX =

- Woodward, Oklahoma; United States
- Frequency: 100.1 MHz

Programming
- Format: Country music
- Affiliations: Westwood One

Ownership
- Owner: Classic Communications, Inc.

Technical information
- Licensing authority: FCC
- Facility ID: 22823
- Class: C1
- ERP: 100,000 watts
- HAAT: 264.5 meters (868 ft)
- Transmitter coordinates: 36.37528°N 99.47528°W

Links
- Public license information: Public file; LMS
- Website: www.woodwardradio.com/kwfx/

KWFX is a radio station airing a country music format licensed to Woodward, Oklahoma, broadcasting on 100.1 FM. The station is owned by Classic Communications, Inc. Music is distributed by Westwood One Hot Country format.
