= 2012 in radio =

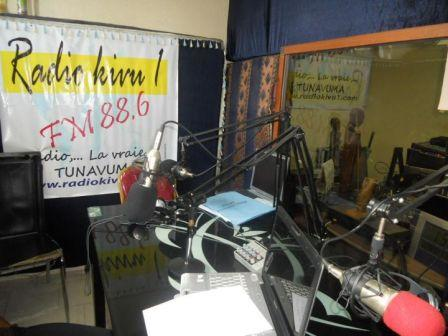
A radio studio in 2012

The following is a list of events affecting radio broadcasting in 2012. Events listed include radio program debuts, finales, cancellations, and station launches, closures and format changes, as well as information about controversies and deaths of radio personalities.

== Notable events ==
=== January ===
Date	Event	Source
1	Red Eye Radio and the Midnight Trucking Radio Network, both syndicated by Cumulus Media Networks, "merge" into one show. Midnight Trucking, hosted by Eric Harley and Gary McNamara (from WBAP—Dallas) is rebranded as Red Eye while Doug McIntyre, host of the original iteration of Red Eye, was reassigned to KABC—Los Angeles; a weekend version of Red Eye hosted by Marc Germain was also dropped.	
1	Rhythmic Top 40 KHTC—Edina/Minneapolis–Saint Paul flips to adult Top 40 KTWN.	
1	Classic rock WZRR—Birmingham, Alabama flips to CHR "99.5 The Vibe".	
1	Adult Top 40 WNNF—Cincinnati flips to country as "Great Country".	
1	Cherry Creek makes a frequency swap in Missoula Top 40 KXDR to the stronger signal of 106.7 FM formerly held by clustermate KBQQ, which moves its main signal from 106.7 to 96.9 FM and its translator to KXDR's former signal at 98.7 FM for better coverage in the Missoula metropolitan area.	
2	Country KTWI—Omaha flips to classic country "93.3 The Wolf".	
2	Oldies WMTI—Picayune, Mississippi/New Orleans flips to sports.	
2	As part of a frequency swap, 95.7 FM in Cedar Rapids officially switches from country (which had moved to 96.5 FM on December 27, 2011) to simulcasting WMT's AM signal; on January 17, the call letters change to KWMG-FM.	
3	The Buffalo Bills Radio Network ends its relationship with Cumulus Media (purchasers of Citadel Broadcasting's assets, including former flagship WGRF and four other network affiliates) and signs a deal with Entercom Communications; as a result, the network's new flagship becomes Entercom's WGR (who already has the Sabres Hockey Network as well) effective that summer.	
4	Talk WPLZ—Chattanooga, Tennessee flips to country.	
4	Co-owned oldies WKAD—Cadillac, Michigan, and adult standards WMBN—Petoskey, Michigan, flip to sports.	
5	The owners of KMVV—Anchorage, which exited the Rhythmic AC MOViN' format in November 2011 before signing off December 31, 2011, announced it plans to return to the air with a Smooth Jazz format as "104.9 The Oasis".	
6	Country KTFW—Fort Worth rebrands to "Hank FM".	
6	Talk WXTL—Syracuse, New York, switches to classic rock "105.9 The Rebel".	
6	Rhythmic Top 40 WHTI—Lakeside/Richmond, Virginia, shifts to CHR but retains the "Hot 100.9" name.	
6	CHR CKHZ—Halifax, Nova Scotia overhauls the format and airstaff, by returning to its dance roots as "Energy 103.5".	
6	Family Radio files papers with the FCC to change the licensing status of WFME—Newark/New York City from non-commercial to commercial, preparing it for a possible sale.	
9	Adult contemporary WDOK—Cleveland rebrands as "The New 102", dropping both longtime midday host Nancy Alden and Delilah.	
9	iHeartRadio announces a deal to bring Greater Media's 22 outlets to its streaming platform, starting in April.	
12	Alternative rock KEXX—Phoenix flips to classic rock "My 103.9".	
12	Classic rock CKQK-FM—Charlottetown, Prince Edward Island flips to CHR "Hot 105.5."	
12	Veteran voiceover artist Bill St. James announces his departure from Cumulus Media Networks' syndicated classic rock series Flashback. Matt Pinfield, host of MTV/MTV2's 120 Minutes, takes over as host.	
13	Clear Channel Communications changes the name of its radio division to Clear Channel Media & Entertainment.	
15	Classic hits/brokered WOLT—Greenville adds dance-oriented hits and remixes via Jamtraxx's Spin-FM service.	
19	The bandwagon of FM sports talk stops in Missoula, Montana as Cherry Creek installs a simulcast of AM KGRZ at 92.7 fm the former home of CHR top 40 KXDR which displaced KBQQ's 106.7 signal.	
20	Adult Top 40 KLZR—Lawrence/Topeka, Kansas flips to CHR "105.9 Kiss-FM".	
20	90s-centric classic hits WMHX—Harrisburg flips to country "The New Z 106.7".	
20	Adult Top 40 KFLX—Flagstaff, Arizona flips to 80s-centric classic hits "Rewind 92.5 & 104.1".	
23	The Canadian Radio-television and Telecommunications Commission has ruled that College-run radio stations in Canada can no longer use students as on-air DJs. This move will mean that CKIC—Winnipeg will be the first station to be forced off the air due to this decision.	
24	Sirius XM Radio offers a free three-month subscription to anyone who buys a used vehicle that was equipped with a satellite radio feature that was made by the Chrysler Group LLC.	
27	Country WPKX—Enfield, Connecticut/Springfield, Massachusetts is relaunched as ESPN Radio affiliate WUCS—Windsor Locks/Hartford.	

=== February ===
Date	Event	Source
3	Adult hits KSZR—Tucson switches to CHR "i97.5".	
5	CHR KCKS—Chico, California flips to sports with the Fox Sports Radio lineup.	
8	The Spanish Top 40 format of XHGTS-FM—Nuevo Laredo, Mexico moves over to KQUR—Laredo, Texas, displacing KQUR's Active Rock format, which moves over to the internet.	
10	Christian contemporary WFGZ—Nashville flips to classic hits WHPY-FM "Hippy Radio 94.5".	
14	Adult contemporary CJGV-FM—Winnipeg flips to adult Top 40 "99.1 Fresh FM".	
14	Country KOAZ—Isleta/Albuquerque flips to smooth jazz "103.7 The Oasis."	
15	WWPW—Charlestown, Indiana/Louisville returns to the air as 80s-centric classic hits WLUE.	
17	Nearly six years after the death of longtime owner Bernie Dittman, the family sells heritage CHR WABB-FM—Mobile to Educational Media Foundation, while WABB—Mobile is retained for the time being. It is regarded as the "end of an era" as WABB and WABB-FM held a Top 40/CHR format continuously in some capacity dating back to Bernie Dittman's purchase of WABB in 1959.	
17	Fort Walton Beach, Florida outlets WFFY and WMXZ adjusts formats, with WFFY shifting from Rhythmic Top 40 to CHR as "Q92." WMXZ flipped from Adult Top 40 to Rock on March 2 and adopting the moniker "103.1 The Blaze."	
20	The Quad Cities picks up another CHR, as KUUL drops its oldies format (which had been in place since 1989) to become "101.3 KISS-FM." Several of KUUL's former syndicated programs are shuffled to sister-station KMXG to create a "retro/oldies" weekend programming block at that station. In response to the format switch, another FM station in the Quad Cities' market, WYEC (93.9 FM), expands its oldies programming by rebranding itself "Rewind 93.9" and adding a block of 50s and 60s music on Fridays.	
22	WFNL—Raleigh returns to the air with programming from 24/7 Comedy Radio. The station, formerly classic country WQDR, had been silent for ten months after its tower was destroyed by a tornado in April 2011.	
24	Cumulus Media expands the "Great Country" branding to current Country outlet WSJR—Wilkes-Barre, and former CHR WKOS—Kingsport.	

=== March ===
Date	Event	Source
1	Concurrent with CHR WABB-FM—Mobile joining the K-Love network as WLVM, Cumulus Media flips adult hits "Jack FM" WYOK—Saraland/Mobile to CHR "104.1 WABD", hiring several WABB-FM personalities and their morning show.	
1	Soft AC KVWE—Missoula, Montana flips to a simulcast of talk KGVO.	
2	Adult contemporary KJMK—Joplin switches to classic hits as "Classic Hits 93.9".	
3	Adult contemporary WIOP—Isle of Palms/Charleston, South Carolina segues to adult Top 40 WMXZ "Mix 95.9".	
4	A series of advertisers including LegalZoom, Citrix, Sleep Number, The Sleep Train, ProFlowers, Quicken Loans and Carbonite, drop or suspend their sponsorship of The Rush Limbaugh Show after host Rush Limbaugh made derogatory remarks toward activist Sandra Fluke, who testified in favor of a rule requiring religious institutions to pay for birth control as part of their health insurance plans. The Sleep Train asked to resume advertising four days later, but Limbaugh refused.	
5	Classical KUDL—Kansas City switches to business programming; the classical format originated as KXTR on 96.5 FM in the 1950s but had been on AM since 2000.	
8	Cumulus Media announced that they are dropping Billy Bush's nighttime program from their CHR outlets. Cumulus, which had an agreement with Westwood One to carry the show (and several other of the network's offerings), acquired the former ABC Radio Networks in fall 2011 and began phasing out programs from Westwood One (which merged with Dial Global at the same time) on its stations.	
9	Entercom purchases KBLX—San Francisco from Inner City Broadcasting for 25 million. The deal comes in the wake of Inner City's bankruptcy and to prevent an attempt by Cumulus Media to acquire the Urban AC outlet.	
9	80s-centric adult hits KBJX—Idaho Falls flips to easy listening "Easy Rock 106".	
9	Hot AC KRMX—Waco, Texas flips to country "Shooter FM"	
9	Adult hits KRXX—Kodiak, Alaska flips to CHR "Hot FM".	
13	Curtis Media Group shuffles its talk programming in the Piedmont Triad and Research Triangle, dropping the format from WZTK—Burlington, North Carolina. Some of WZTK's programming moves to WSJS—Winston-Salem and WPTK—Raleigh, ending the oldies format of WKIX; WPTK also inherits most of WPTF's talk programming as that station moves to an emphasis on news programming.	
15	Federated Media announces that it will simulcast Fort Wayne talk station WOWO on the FM dial starting April 1, displacing classic rock WFWI. The simulcast actually starts on March 28.	
16	Montreal-based Astral Media announces an agreement to merge its assets with Bell Media for $3.38 billion; among the assets included in the sale are 85 Astral-owned radio stations in the Canadian provinces of Alberta, British Columbia, Manitoba, New Brunswick, Nova Scotia, Ontario, Quebec and Saskatchewan.	
16	CHR WXKR-HD2/W246AK—Port Clinton/Toledo flips to alternative rock as "The Zone".	
16	Classic rock KRWK—Fargo, North Dakota flips to syndicated conservative talk as a complement to co-owned talk KFGO—Fargo.	
19	Adult contemporary WWWM-FM—Sylvania/Toledo flips to CHR, retaining the "Star 105.5" name.	
22	Cumulus Media expands the AC formatted "Warm" brand to two markets: alternative rock KYNF—Fayetteville, Arkansas, and Jack FM formatted KBIU—Lake Charles, Louisiana.	
23	Gospel WFJO—Jacksonville Beach/Jacksonville, Florida, flips to sports WJXL-FM, simulcasting WJXL.	
23	WLOV-FM Daytona Beach Shores/Daytona Beach, Florida signs on with a soft AC format.	
24	Country KIXZ—Opportunity/Spokane, Washington flips to CHR "Hits 96.1".	
26	KLIF—Dallas begins a transition from talk to an all-news format, debuting news-intensive blocks in both morning and afternoon drive as "News/Information 570.".	
29	Modern AC KSCF—San Diego flips to CHR "Energy 103.7." A few days later, the call letters changed to KEGY.	
30	KDHT-FM—Denver flips from CHR to Dance.	

=== April ===
Date	Event	Source
1	WARG—Summit, Illinois a student and volunteer-run radio outlet operated by Argo Community High School and whose signal covers the southwestern portions of Chicago and Cook County, dropped the alternative rock format after 36 years in favor of Dance, with most of the music provided by internet broadcaster Fusion Radio. The station's staff and volunteers were retained, as well as their programming lineup when Dance music is not aired.	
1	WCMQ-FM—Miami flips from Spanish Oldies to Salsa and adopts the "Zeta" moniker that was once used at WINZ and WZTA.	
2	Bloomington, Illinois becomes the latest radio market to see two stations flip formats within 72 hours of each other, with WVMG dropping AC for CHR as "Hits 100.7" WWHX, and WZIM dropping classic hits for Sports Talk on April 5.	
4	Clear Channel expand its Top 40 roster, and adds a three-way race in two markets: WVMA—Norfolk, and KVJM—Bryan/College Station, Texas.	
9	Another Clear Channel outlet flips to CHR, as WMRV—Binghamton, New York returns to the format after spending time as an Adult Top 40 but continues to bill itself as "Star 105.7."	
10	CBS Radio sells their West Palm Beach cluster of Rhythmic Top 40 WMBX, Adult Top 40 WPBZ, AC WEAT, Country WIRK and Adult R&B WHFS to locally based Palm Beach Broadcasting LLC (the owners of WRMF; and headed by GoodRadio.TV chairman Dean Goodman) for $50 Million, pending FCC approval. WEAT and WHFS will be resold to a third party along with plans to move WEAT's format and call letters to WPBZ and a possible frequency relocation for WEAT's 104.3 signal into the Miami-Ft. Lauderdale area; the WHFS call letters will remain with CBS.	
10	As a result of Canada's Conservative Government's announced plan to make a $115 million (CDN) reduction in funding over the next three years, The CBC announces that it will eliminate 650 jobs and for the first time since 1975 will begin airing commercials on their stations, but limiting it to their music outlets only.	
11	Double O Radio sells their Panama City, Florida cluster of Rhythmic Top 40 WPFM, classic rock WRBA, Bob FM formatted WASJ and Country WAKT to Powell Broadcasting for $950,000. No changes will be made under the turnover.	
13	Adult Top 40 KQHN—Waskom, Texas/Shreveport, Louisiana flips to CHR "i97.3".	
13	The Minneapolis–St. Paul "Love 105" oldies trimulcast of WGVX-—Lakeville/WGVY—Cambridge/WGVZ—Eden Prairie shifts to adult contemporary.	
16	After 43 years, WKDN—Philadelphia ceases its broadcast of Family Radio following its sale to Merlin Media. The station launched a news talk format on May 7 under the new call letters WWIQ.	
17	Howard Stern loses his lawsuit against Sirius XM Radio in which Stern sought $300 million in stock from the company for meeting benchmarks. The ruling determined Stern did not meet those benchmarks and resulted in the case being dismissed with prejudice.	
17	WQTL—Tallahassee goes from Oldies "Q106.1" to a hybrid classic rock/AAA format as "106.1 The Path."	
18	WJGH—Jacksonville trades classic hits "Magic 107.3" for adult hits "Jack FM".	
23	Keeping "The Bone" name intact, WHPT—Tampa makes the shift from classic rock to Hot Talk.	
23	After less than eight months on the air, Cumulus Media drops the 80s/90s "Journey" format from WJLQ—Pensacola in favor of a simulcast of news/talk WCOA.	
24	Merlin Media assumes operational control of WLFM-LP channel 6 (the audio carrier of which functions as a radio station at 87.7 FM) via a local marketing agreement (LMA). WLFM flips from smooth jazz to alternative rock as "Q87.7" WKQX-LP on May 7, but is unrelated to Q101 Chicago, an internet station launched after the intellectual property of "Q101" was divested prior to WKQX—Chicago's flip to all-news WIQI. Broadcast Barter Radio Networks, owners of "Q101 Chicago", start carrying that stream's programming over WJJG—Elmhurst as "Q101 on 1530" hours before "Q87.7" launches.	
26	ESPN Radio announces that it will be taking over Emmis' New York urban AC WRKS starting April 30 via a LMA. ESPN's flagship station, WEPN, will simulcast, and eventually move to, the 98.7 frequency (retitled WEPN-FM on May 14). Emmis then announced that they would be selling off the intellectual property of "98.7 Kiss" to YMF Media, slated to take over WRKS's main competitor WBLS, along with WLIB, from Inner City Broadcasting.	
30	Townsquare Media and Cumulus Media swap 65 stations in 13 US radio markets in a deal worth $116 million. With this deal, Cumulus enters Peoria and Bloomington, Illinois while Townsquare enters 11 small markets as part of the trade.	

=== May ===
Date	Event	Source
7	FM 107.3 in South Bristol, New York resumes independent operations, ending its simulcast of WHTK—Rochester and adopting an oldies format as WODX.	
16	The Boston Phoenix announces on their blog that their co-owned alternative rock outlet WFNX—Boston will be sold to Clear Channel Communications for $11 Million. The station flipped to adult hits two months later and adopted new call letters as WHBA.	
16	Albuquerque, New Mexico adds yet another CHR, as KLQT drops AC to become "Channel 95.1".	
16	The Larry H. Miller Group acquires KZNS-AM & FM from the SLC Divestiture Trust, which was set up to spin off stations that was placed on sale from Simmons Broadcasting after it purchased Mill Creek Broadcasting in 2010. The Sports Talk combo will become the new broadcast home for the Utah Jazz, which is owned by Miller.	
17	WNUE—Orlando flips from Spanish adult hits to Salsa as "Salsa 98.1".	
18	Hot AC KDMX—Dallas switches to adult Top 40 "102.9 NOW".	
23	Alternative rock WMMS-HD2—Cleveland rebrands as "99X" after adding a relay overlow-power translator W256BT.	
23	WSGX—St. Louis flips from "Gen-X" Hot AC to 80s-focused classic rock as "100.3 The Brew."	
24	"She 103.5" returns to Miami as WMIB moves to adult hits, leaving behind Spanish AC "Super X." The "She" name was used at the station previously until 1995.	
25	WXKT—Athens drops Talk for classic hits as "103.7 Chuck FM".	
29	Cumulus Media flips WYAY—Atlanta's format from classic hits to all-news, marking the third attempt at the format in the market's recent history. Former KDKA—Pittsburgh program director Marshall Adams was tabbed by Cumulus for like duties at the new station.	
30	Adult Top 40 WLER—Butler, Pennsylvania flips to active rock.	
30	Urban WGBZ—Anniston, Alabama flips to classic rock.	

=== June ===
Date	Event	Source
1	Palm Beach Radio makes a series of changes in South Florida, all triggered by the sale of CBS Radio's West Palm Beach, Florida cluster to Palm Beach Broadcasting, LLC. Country-formatted WIRK moves from its 107.9 frequency to 103.1, replacing Adult Top 40 WPBZ. Adult contemporary station WEAT moves from its longtime home at 104.3 to the 107.9 frequency. The 104.3 signal officially changed its COL from West Palm Beach to Miramar, targeting Miami with a Smooth AC format under the new call letters WMSF. It is expected to be a temporary placement until Palm Beach Broadcasting finds a buyer for the station.	
4	Federated Media flips its four Indiana stations WFGA, WLEG, WAOR and WNIL to Sports.	
6	KXLI—Las Vegas is sold to Radio Activo Broadcasting. A format change to Spanish CHR occurred on July 1.	
7	KEXX—Phoenix makes the transition from adult hits to Adult Top 40.	
11	The Glenn Beck Program is renewed for another five years on Premiere Networks as Premiere and host Glenn Beck reach a contract extension that runs through 2017.	
12	KOGM—Lafayette, Louisiana drops classic hits for Adult Top 40 as "Mix 107.1".	
13	Bernard Radio sold WRBP—Youngstown, Ohio to Educational Media Foundation for $500,000. The station will flip from urban contemporary to Christian Music. On Jan 24 2013, call letters were changed to WYLR.	
14	WTDA and WMNI—Columbus flip their formats to all-news, branded as "NewsRadio 103.9 and 920". The flip also reduces the number of Oldies/classic hits outlets in Columbus from five stations to three.	
14	WOBE—Iron Mountain, Michigan flips from classic hits to CHR, branded "100.7 Radio Now".	
18	Urban AC KRMP—Oklahoma City adds an FM translator at 92.1 and rebrands its moniker from "1140 The Touch" to "Heart & Soul 92.1 & 1140," thus allowing the AM daytimer to broadcast around the clock.	
25	Spanish AC WRMA—Miami flips to bilingual Dance Top 40 as "DJ 106.7," with former crosstown Rhythmic Top 40 WPOW morning host DJ Laz adding similar duties via voicetracking from sister station KXOL—Los Angeles starting July 4.	
25	Boston.com, the website of The Boston Globe, announces the launching of an internet alternative rock radio station, employing the former air staff of WFNX, which was sold to Clear Channel in May.	
25	WLFN—La Crosse, Wisconsin flips from Adult Standards to All Talk as "Today's Talk 1190".	
26	iHeartRadio announces that Cox Radio and Emmis Communications will join the platform. Two days later, the same two companies, along with Entercom, also signed a similar deal with TuneIn to add their stations to the platform.	
28	Classic hits WODS—Boston flips to CHR "103.3 AMP Radio"; the prior format is moved to WODS-HD2.	
28	Rhythmic oldies KOKO—Fresno shifts to classic hits.	
28	Univision makes format changes in the Dallas-Ft. Worth radio market. KESS drops Spanish Oldies for Bilingual Top 40/CHR, billing itself as "Radio H2O" with most of the presentation in English. At the same time, sister station KDXX goes from Spanish Oldies to Regional Mexican and KFZO goes from Regional Mexican to Spanish AC.	
29	WWNU—Columbia, South Carolina flips from soft AC to Triple-A as "92.1 The Palm".	

=== July ===
Date	Event	Source
1	WBOW-FM—Terre Haute, Indiana drops AC for Country as "Q102.7" and changes call letters to WDWQ.	
2	WLYT—Charlotte departs the AC format and becomes adult hits as "102.9 The Lake".	
2	Rhythmic oldies KJHM—Denver switches to rhythmic AC.	
3	90s-centric classic hits KTGX—Tulsa switches to country "106.1 The Twister."	
3	Just a year after making a return to morning drive, Rick Dees parts ways with KHHT—Los Angeles.	
10	Cumulus Media spins off classic hits WRQQ—Nashville to Educational Media Foundation, giving Nashville its first K-LOVE outlet. The station flipped on July 15.	
15	As part of a station trade between Cumulus and Educational Media Foundation that included WRQQ, Cumulus acquires the license for K-Love outlet WLVM—Mobile, Alabama in exchange for the license of urban AC WDLT—Chickasaw/Mobile. Cumulus flips WLVM to CHR as WABD (restoring the format on the 97.5 FM frequency) and flips CHR WABD Saraland/Mobile to urban AC WDLT (restoring the format on the 104.1 FM frequency), while EMF changes WDLT to K-Love WLVM.	
16	CHLQ-FM Magic 93 Charlottetown flips to classic rock Q93 filling a void left in the market after Newcap's K-Rock 105.5 became CHR Hot 105.5 earlier this year	
17	Plagued by low ratings and uneven programming methods, Merlin Media ends the all-news formats of both WEMP—New York and WIQI—Chicago after less than a year, flipping them back to music-based formats. With the move, WEMP reverts to alternative rock as "New Rock 101.9" (exactly one year and two days after predecessor WRXP signed off) and WIQI takes an adult hits format as "i101." The format changes were sudden, and a vast majority of personnel for both stations were dismissed as a result.	
17	Alternative rock KHJK—Houston flips to Air1 upon its change of ownership from Cumulus to EMF via a LMA.	
21	Randy Owen, lead singer of Alabama, takes over Country Gold, the long-running Saturday night classic country request program currently heard on Dial Global. In doing so, the new program mostly abandons its request format dating to its launch on Westwood One in the early 1990s.	
27	WUTQ-AM and WRCK, a pair of daytime-only AM radio stations in the Mohawk Valley, are sold to new ownership. The two stations, the former of which is to change call signs to WUSP, will adopt a sports radio format with elements of the predecessor's full service trappings; the stations' previous adult contemporary format will continue on WUTQ-FM, which is not included in the sale.	

=== August ===
Date	Event	Source
1	The HD2 and translator of Urban WQUE—New Orleans drops its Old School Hip-Hop format for CHR as "96.3 KISS FM." This marks the second time in this market that Clear Channel has used the Top 40 "KISS-FM" brand, which was last used at KSTE.	
2	CBS Radio flips WSJT—Tampa from Hot AC "Play 98.7" to Sports Talk as "98.7 The Fan".	
8	The Montreal Canadiens file a request of intervention with the CRTC to oppose Bell Globemedia's plan to change the language of Sports Talk CKGM—Montreal from anglophone to Francophone. The NHL team are worried that the move will displace their English-language listeners and is asking that the station broadcast the games in both languages	
13	WXKS-AM drops the Talk format for Comedy as "Matty's Comedy 1200." Some of WXKS' existing programming, including The Rush Limbaugh Show and Coast to Coast AM were picked up by WRKO.	
13	Talk WOR—New York City (as well as its associated syndication network) is sold by Buckley Broadcasting to Clear Channel for $30 million.	
13	WQJK—Knoxville flipped from Jack FM to CHR as "95.7 Power FM."	
16	Radio One announced that it has acquired Spanish Sports Talk WZZQ-AM (including its translator) and its Regional Mexican sister station WNOW-FM—Charlotte from Gaffney Broadcasting for $7.75 Million, but will hold on to the FM and will start programming the station via a LMA on September 4, 2012, ending Davidson Media Group's involvement with the station. The AM and translator will be spun off to a third party. WNOW flipped to a Rhythmic Oldies format on August 27.	
17	CIQM—London, Ontario drops Hot AC and the EZ Rock format for CHR, adopting parent company Astral Media's "Virgin Radio" branding.	
21	CHAM—Hamilton, Ontario abandons its country music format and joins Cumulus Media Networks's 24/7 Comedy Radio network. CHAM joins CKSL—London, Ontario, a corporate sister station, in programming the American network. (Because the network is entirely spoken word, it is not subject to Canadian content requirements.)	
24	Lincoln Financial Media announced that they will purchase WMSF—Miami from Palm Beach Radio for $13 Million and will flip the Smooth AC outlet to Sports, simulcasting sister AM WAXY under a LMA deal until the deal is approved by the FCC.	
25	Salem Communications purchases WMUU-FM—Greenville from Gospel Fellowship Association, affiliated with Bob Jones University. The Christian/Beautiful Music outlet will move to online as the station flips to Conservative Talk programming from Salem Radio Network	
27	WDXX—Montgomery flips from Country to broad-based adult hits, branded as "Fuzion 100.1."	
28	Talk Radio Network files an antitrust lawsuit against Dial Global.	
29	Springfield, Missouri picks up a Rhythmic Top 40 outlet, as KOSP exits classic hits to become "92.9 The Beat."	
29	Mainstream rock WKLS—Atlanta flips to CHR WWPW "Power 96.1" while WWWQ-HD2 flips to active rock a few days later.	
31	CHR CKMM—Winnipeg is the latest station in Canada to adopt parent company Astral Media's Virgin Radio branding.	
31	Cumulus and EMF swap stations, with EMF exchanging K-LOVE outlet KXPC—Eugene, Oregon for Cumulus' Adult Top 40 KRUZ—Santa Barbara, California. Cumulus will hang onto the KRUZ call letters.	
31	WJSE—Cape May, New Jersey drops classic hits in favor of alternative rock.	
31	KMRJ—Palm Springs drops classic rock for Rhythmic Hot AC as "Jammin' 99.5."	

=== September ===
Date	Event	Source
1	MOViN' returned to Anchorage, as KNLT exits AC to pick the Rhythmic AC format that was dropped by KMVV back in November 2011. KMVV, which flipped to Christmas music after dropping the MOViN' brand, has been silent since February 2012 and has yet to return to the air.	
1	Adult contemporary KOLL—Lonoke/Little Rock flips regional Mexican, bringing its first Spanish formatted outlet to the market.	
2	Classic rock KQBW—Omaha flips to CHR "95.7 Kiss FM".	
4	Country WZKT—Lewes, Delaware flips to talk radio WXDE "Delaware 105.9".	
4	Adult hits WCHY—Madison changes to adult Top 40 "Mix 105.1".	
4	NBC Sports Radio launches, competing with ESPN Radio and Fox Sports Radio as a sports radio network.	
7	For the first time since WLUM flipped to alternative rock in 1994, the Rhythmic Top 40 format returned to Milwaukee, as WZBK-FM dropped Classic Country to become "Energy 106.9" and changes call letters to WNRG-FM.	
7	90s-centric classic hits WQSH—Albany flips to adult Top 40 "PopCrush 105.7".	
7	Adult hits KJAC—Fort Collins, Colorado, the first station to adopt the Jack FM format in the United States in 2004, flips to a simulcast of KDSP—Denver.	
10	WOSW—Fulton, Oswego County, New York ends its simulcast of Radio Disney (which will remain heard on WOLF/WWLF) and adopts a classic country format, which has not been heard in Central New York since WSCP abandoned the format in 2007.	
10	Florence, South Carolina picks up a R&B/Hip-Hop simulcast, as AC WRZE and Gospel combo WWRK & W290CD become "Swagga 94.1 & 105.9."	
11	Abilene, Texas sees two sister stations owned by Doud Media Group switch signals and format flips, with CHR KORQ moving from 95.1 to 96.1, replacing Fox News Radio affiliate KFNA due to lackluster ratings. The 95.1 signal will be replaced with Country, as it brings back "The Wolf" moniker that was last heard at the 96.1 signal in 2010.	
12	WROO—Greenville drops its hybrid Christian/AC format for classic rock, branded as "96.7 The Road".	
13	Mainestream Media takes control of WBQW—Kennebunkport, Maine (serving the Portland area), and drops its simulcast of WBACH for a stunt of Christmas music. The station adopted a CHR format the following day.	
13	Urban AC WQNC—Harrisburg/Charlotte, North Carolina, flips to a simulcast of gospel WPZS—Indian Trail.	
14	90s-centric classic hits WIGX—Smithtown, New York flips to mainstream rock "94.3 The Shark".	
17	Hot AC KYYY—Bismarck, North Dakota is the latest Clear Channel outlet to make a return to its former CHR format.	
19	KRPT—San Antonio drops Conservative Talk for Rhythmic Top 40 as "WiLD 92.5 & 105.7," the latter being the former FM translator simulcast of AM News sister WOAI due to KRPT being signal challenged in San Antonio proper.	
26	Talk WGST—Atlanta switches to ESPN Deportes Radio, dismissing the station's entire airstaff including afternoon host Rusty Humphries. Two syndicated WGST programs, The Rush Limbaugh Show and The Glenn Beck Program were picked up by WSB—Atlanta/WSBB—Doraville and WCFO—East Point, respectively.	

=== October ===
Date	Event	Source
1	Adult Top 40 KDMX—Dallas (which competed directly against co-owned CHR KHKS—Denton/Dallas) reverts to hot AC while retaining the "102.9 Now" brand.	
4	Adult Top 40 WERZ—Portsmouth, New Hampshire reverts to CHR "Z107", while co-owned CHR WSKX—York Center, Maine flips to adult contemporary "95.3 The Coast" moniker on October 10.	
4	Talk simulcast WOLH—Florence, South Carolina and WHYM/W255BD—Lake City, South Carolina flip to rhythmic oldies "Jammin' 98.9."	
8	CBS Radio purchases alternative WRXP—New York City from Merlin Media for $75 million, relaunching the signal as sports WFAN-FM (a round-the-clock simulcast of WFAN New York City) on November 2.	
11	Clear Channel expands the iHeartRadio platform to Australia and New Zealand, with a customized version being launched through part-owned Australian Radio Network.	
15	KRML—Monterey, California, the station made famous in the 1971 film "Play Misty for Me," drops its longtime Jazz format for CHR as "Radio Yummi." Their slogan is "All the hits, over and over again." However, this is later revealed to be a stunt as KRML unveiled a Triple-A format that includes Jazz and Blues programming on October 29.	
16	Family Radio sells WFME—Newark/New York City to Cumulus Media.	
18	The CRTC has denied Bell Media's proposed plan to merge with Astral Media, citing that the deal was "not in the public interest," and added that the merger would not provide "significant and unequivocal benefits to the Canadian broadcasting system and to Canadians sufficient to outweigh its concerns." In addition, the proposed plan that was tied to that deal, the conversion of CKGM—Montreal from anglophone to francophone, was also turned down due to lack of support.	
19	KCAR—Joplin, Missouri drops All-Comedy for Adult Top 40 as "Star 104.3".	
23	Radio One sells adult hits "Jack FM" WJKR—Upper Arlington/Columbus to Salem Communications, which flips the station to conservative talk "98.9 The Answer".	
23	Mel Karmazin announces that he stepping down as CEO of Sirius XM Radio effective February 1, 2013. The decision comes as Liberty Media prepares to acquire the remaining 50.5% ownership of the satellite radio broadcaster.	
24	Adult album alternative WZGC—Atlanta flips to sports "92.9 The Game", utilizing an entirely local airstaff and no syndicated programming.	
25	Sports WBNS-FM—Columbus fires morning host Scott Torgerson after an October 13, 2012, tweet written by him — wishing ESPN personality (and Michigan Wolverines alum) Desmond Howard could "get fired or die" so he can watch College GameDay again — went viral.	
25	Urban AC WEOA—Evansville adds an FM translator at 98.5 and rebrands to "Magic 98.5."	

=== November ===
Date	Event	Source
1	Adult hits WCHK—Seymour/Appleton, Wisconsin begins stunting with Christmas music, flipping to Hot AC WKZG after the holidays.	
1	Talk WLRS—Shepherdsville/Louisville also begins stunting with Christmas music, ultimately flipping to soft AC "Easy 105.1."	
2	Rhythmic hot AC WMOV—Norfolk also stunts with Christmas music, but returns to the same "Movin'" format on December 26.	
2	Killer Radio and Flashback In 60 Minutes are pulled from WKCB-FM, and the station is met with overwhelming backlash from fans of both shows.	
7	Urban AC KTLK-FM—Columbia, Illinois/St. Louis flips to Rhythmic Top 40 "WiLD 104.9", while classic rock KBWX—Bridgeton, Missouri/St. Louis assumes the KMJM call sign and urban AC format.	
7	Urban AC WFUN-FM—St. Louis flips to rhythmic oldies "Old School 95.5."	
8	After 27 years, CBS Radio retires the call letters of CHR WXRK/New York City, replaces them with WNOW-FM to match the 92.3 NOW moniker	
9	Sports CFAC—Calgary suspends morning host Dean "Boomer" Molberg after he made comments that he hoped the Saskatchewan Roughriders' plane to Calgary for the November 11 CFL playoff against the Calgary Stampeders would crash and four players would die, a reference to a 1956 plane crash that took the lives of four Stampeders and a member of the Winnipeg Blue Bombers, whose grandson happens to be a current player with the Stampeders. Molberg later apologized for the comments. CFAC also announced that it would make a donation to a charity of the Roughriders' choice and that Molberg's suspension will be lifted after the CFL season ends.	
9	Progressive talk KPOJ—Portland switches to sports, while similarly formatted KPTK—Seattle announces they will do the same five days later.	
10	Gospel WPRF—Reserve/New Orleans switches to classic country WGUO "Gumbo 94.9"	
15	CHR CFWD—Saskatoon, Saskatchewan releases their airstaff and begins stunting with Christmas music, flipping to classic hits "96.3 Cruz FM" after the holidays.	
15	Dial Global announces it has extended its exclusive agreement with the National Football League through the 2017 NFL season. The agreement was originally scheduled to expire in 2014.	
21	Talk WTDY-AM/FM—Madison, Wisconsin terminates their airstaff and begins stunting Christmas music.	
22	Spanish contemporary KXOS—Los Angeles flips to bilingual rhythmic Top 40 featuring English-language music and Spanish-speaking DJs; this is patterned after XHFAJ—Mexico City, whose owner Grupo Radio Centro has a partial ownership stake in KXOS.	
22	CHR WDCG—Raleigh-Durham issues an apology to the city of Raleigh, its mayor Nancy McFarlane, the Greater Raleigh Merchants Association and CBS affiliate WRAL after a float featuring an African-American man dressed as an angel hanging from a Christmas tree sponsored by WDCG was featured in WRAL's telecast of their annual Christmas Parade on November 17. The float, which also featured WDCG morning stars Bob and the Showgram, was blasted by officials and parade goers as a depiction of a lynching, and as a result of this incident the show's producer, who did not approve of the float's concept, was terminated.	
30	Dance KDHT—Bennett/Denver begins stunting as "Pot 107.1" playing songs with drug references, flipping to adult hits "Jack FM" on December 2.	

=== December ===
Date	Event	Source
1	Suburban Los Angeles area rimshot AC trimulcasts KLST/KLSN/KLSI (serving Orange, Ventura and San Bernardino counties respectively) all flip to the satellite feed of Air1 under a leasing agreement between owner Amaturo Group and Educational Media Foundation.	
2	KRUZ—Santa Barbara drops Modern AC to begin carrying Air1 from Educational Media Foundation, who acquired the station in a trade deal with Cumulus Media in exchange for EMF's KXPC—Eugene.	
4	Australian radio presenters Mel Greig and Mike Christian, impersonating the Queen and Prince of Wales, make a prank call to King Edward VII's Hospital in London which is providing prenatal care to Catherine, Duchess of Cambridge. The following day, their conversations with two nurses are broadcast without consent on their Hot30 Countdown show on 2Day FM in Sydney. On 7 December follows the suicide of Jacintha Saldanha, one of the nurses involved.	
14	Progressive talk WVKO—Columbus reverts to gospel music after the local marketing agreement by station operator Gary Richards ends, citing a lack of support from advertisers and the Ohio Democratic Party itself.	
18	The A.C. Nielsen Co. announces that they will acquire Arbitron, bringing together two of America's largest rating services. The deal, which has been approved by the boards of both companies, is subject to customary closing conditions, including regulatory review.	
20	Adult hits WHBA—Lynn/Boston switches to EDM "Evolution 101.7".	
21	KOSY-FM—Salt Lake City drops AC for Active Rock, which had previously been used on its FM translator.	
26	Former talk KOGO simulcast KOGO-FM—San Diego flips to rhythmic oldies KSSX "95.7 Kiss FM" after stunting with Christmas music for one month.	
26	Adult Top 40 WARM—York, Pennsylvania reverts to adult contemporary.	
26	Adult Top 40 WRIK-FM Metropolis, Illinois/Paducah, Kentucky flips to CHR using the "Jelli" branding.	
28	CHR KGKS—Scott City/Cape Girardeau, Missouri assumes the classic hits format of KLSC—Malden, Missouri, which flips to a simulcast of sports KGIR—Cape Girardeau/KMAL—Maiden.	

== Debuts ==
Date	Event	Source
January 3	Chris Plante, late-morning host at WMAL AM/FM—Washington, D.C., begins a temporary run in limited syndication via Cumulus Media Networks. The run ends in April, but Chris's WMAL show is eventually simulcast on WCOA-FM—Pensacola, Florida via a separate arrangement.	
January 3	Fox News Channel personality Geraldo Rivera debuts a late-morning show at WABC (AM)—New York City, and then launches another late-morning show specifically for KABC (AM)—Los Angeles on January 30. The series is expected to go national in August.	
January 12	National Latino Broadcasting teams up with Christina Saralegui to launch a new Spanish channel, Christina Radio, on SiriusXM 146, targeting multi-generational Hispanics	
February 27	WJJF—Montauk, New York–New London, Connecticut signed on with a news/talk format.	
March 5	After intermittently operating for a number of years as a translator of WDMO, a station targeted at the larger Eau Claire-Menomonie market, WRDN relaunches as a locally programmed station based in Durand, Wisconsin.	
April 1	NBC News and Dial Global extend NBC News Radio into a 24-hour radio news operation. Established in 2003 by preceding syndicator Westwood One and NBC, the network features a mix of reports from NBC News anchors and correspondents, along with simulcasts of breaking news coverage from NBC and MSNBC. It is NBC's first entry in a full-time radio news operation since then-majority owner General Electric sold off the original NBC Radio Network to Westwood One in 1987. The lone program from the original "NBC Radio" still in active production, First Light with Dirk Van, also concurrently resurrects the long-ago silenced "NBC" branding (it was primarily branded as either a Westwood One or Dial Global program throughout the 2000s).	
April 2	Talk Radio Network begins producing its own in-house hourly newscasts under the America's Radio News banner.	
April 3	WZFT—Baltimore, Maryland adds The Kane Show in morning drive, replacing Jackson Blue, who left for WXKS—Boston.	
April 4	KWXS—Bend, Oregon debuts with a Rhythmic contemporary format.	
April 5	WDMO, formerly licensed to Durand, Wisconsin but operating from studios in Menomonie, relaunches as a country format station licensed to Baldwin, Wisconsin.	
April 9	Mike Huckabee begins in national syndication via Cumulus Media Networks, airing in the noon to 3 p.m. time slot, directly opposite market leader The Rush Limbaugh Show.	
May 21	Perez Hilton begins a nightly program in national syndication via Cumulus Media Networks, airing in the 7 to 11 p.m. time slot. The program will air on Cumulus' Top 40 and Adult Top 40 outlets as the replacement for Billy Bush's syndicated program, which Cumulus dropped in February.	
June 7	After seven days of testing out a Polka format, KJQY—Pueblo debuts with a Rhythmic/Dance Top 40 format, billed as "Power 103.3"	
June 24	Premiere Networks soft-launches a satellite talk radio program hosted by convicted ex-lobbyist Jack Abramoff.	
August 17	WDDE—Dover, Delaware, a public radio formatted joint venture of Delaware State University and the University of Delaware, begins broadcasting.	
August 27	Premiere Networks launches Ground Zero with Clyde Lewis into national syndication.	
September 4	Two competing sports radio networks, NBC Sports Radio and CBS Sports Radio, launch limited programming at the same time; CBS is distributed through Cumulus Media Networks while NBC is distributed by Dial Global. The moves effectively sever CBS's sports ties to Dial Global, the new owner of former CBS subsidiary Westwood One's assets.	
October 10	KYXE—Yakima, Washington signs on, carrying a stunt of Christmas music.	
November 16	WEHP—Erie, Pennsylvania debuts with a CHR format, billing themselves as "Happi 92.7"	
December 20	Andrea Tantaros and Jason Mattera launch a daily program on Talk Radio Network.	

== Endings ==
Date	Event	Source
January 24	After 46 years of serving Milwaukee's African-American community, WNOV and its FM translator W273AT both went off the air. Although a filing have yet to be made with the FCC, both stations have gone silent for the time being.	
February 1	Martz Communications Group shuts down the operations of their Detroit HD/FM translator outlets W284BQ and W232CA (WGPR-HD3) due to financial issues.	
February 16	Nick Cannon departs the morning show on CHR WXRK—New York City, due to ongoing health problems.	
February 17	The MJ Morning Show on CHR WFLZ-FM—Tampa, Florida, ends after host Todd Schnitt (aka "MJ Kelli") opts to concentrate on his talk radio show.	
February 29	Lou Dobbs ends his radio show.	
March 1	WBFO—Buffalo, New York, the University at Buffalo's radio station, ceases operations and switches to a simulcast of WNED, following the sale of the station to WNED's ownership. The move marks the end of jazz on Buffalo radio.	
April 1	CNN will shut down its radio news division. Most of CNN Radio's affiliation roster will switch over to carry "NBC News Radio"; coincidentally, CNN Radio replaced most affiliates of the original NBC Radio Network, and that of the Mutual Broadcasting System, when both networks were absorbed into Westwood One in the late 1990s.	
June 4	Neal Boortz announces his retirement, with Boortz's regular fill-in, former presidential candidate Herman Cain, slated as his replacement. The change takes effect in January 2013.	
June 8	Car Talk announces it will cease production and enter reruns in September 2012, due to the retirement of hosts Tom and Ray Magliozzi. The program continues to be distributed in reruns (repurposing content from prior broadcasts) over NPR stations.	
June 22	After 20 years as a morning host, Jack Murphy has stepped down from that position at CHR WKZL—Greensboro/Winston-Salem.	
June 29	After 22 years as a morning co-host, CHR WKRZ—Wilkes-Barre/Scranton air personality Sue Barre will retire from broadcasting to concentrate on her real estate business.	
July 2	Bates Technical College's KXOT—Tacoma goes silent after a deal to sell the station to LMA partner KUOW—Seattle through a loan deal falls through, resulting in the bank taking over the station until new owners are found. KUOW has moved KXOT's programming over to its HD2 channel.	
July 4	CKIC—Winnipeg officially signs off the air and returns its license back to the CRTC after its owners decided not to challenge its decision that college run radio stations in Canada can no longer use students as airstaffers.	
July 14	Fox All Access ends its run after 19 years and 938 episodes in syndication.	
July 27	G. Gordon Liddy ends his nationally syndicated radio show after 20 years, with Peter Schiff designated as his successor.	
August 17	After 25-year run, KLOS—Los Angeles' Mark and Brian Show airs its final broadcast. The decision to end the program came when co-host Mark Thompson announced on June 13 that he was retiring from radio and move to Charlotte with his wife and that co-host Brian Phelps would continue solo for the time being after Thompson leaves, but on the same day of the final broadcast as a morning team, Phelps surprises listeners by announcing that he was also leaving KLOS on-air because he and KLOS' owner Cumulus Media couldn't come to terms on a new contract deal.	
September 27	The Savage Nation abruptly ends its run after Savage wins a two-year-old lawsuit against syndicator Talk Radio Network over the terms of his contract. Host Michael Savage also gains control of his entire show archive (as a result TRN cannot air "best of" reruns) but also agrees to a non-compete clause, which will prevent him from doing radio for an undisclosed amount of time. At the time of the show's ending it was the fifth most-listened-to radio program in the United States, with nine million listeners. A new incarnation of the show debuts four weeks later on Cumulus Media Networks.	
September 30	Quebec 800 (CHRC), the last AM radio station in Quebec City, ceases operations.	
November 27	The Laura Ingraham Show ends its run after host Laura Ingraham's contract with Talk Radio Network expires without being renewed, marking the second major defection from the network's lineup this year. Ingraham later revives the show on Courtside Entertainment Group.	
November 30	CJRN—Niagara Falls, Ontario has its licence revoked for failure to follow the terms of its licence.	
December 1	Jim Santella, a longtime radio host associated with various Buffalo rock radio stations since 1969 (most recently as a weekend blues host at WBFO), retires.	
December 10	WEAG—Starke, Florida surrenders its license to the FCC. The license and callsign are deleted on December 17.	
December 20	WGN—Chicago cancels The World According to John Williams and Extension 720 with Milt Rosenberg, the latter of which had aired on WGN since 1973. Overnight hosts Steve and Johnnie had been dismissed nine days prior.	

== Deaths ==
Date	Name	Age	Nationality and notability	Source
January 3	Bill Heywood	75	Radio personality in the Phoenix, Arizona market.	
January 22	Jim Irwin	77	Former sportscaster for WTMJ—Milwaukee, WI and radio analyst for the Green Bay Packers, Milwaukee Bucks, Wisconsin Badgers football, and Milwaukee Brewers	
February 1	Don Cornelius	75	Radio host on WVON—Chicago, R&B music promoter, founder of the TV series Soul Train	
February 9	Dave Maynard	82	Radio host on WBZ-AM and television host on WBZ-TV	
March 1	Andrew Breitbart	43	American conservative radio, television and Internet pundit	
April 7	Mike Wallace	93	Radio actor and journalist, radio career spanned from 1939 to 2008	
April 16	Dick Clark	82	Host of the nationally syndicated radio programs U.S. Music Survey (a top-40 countdown) and Rock, Roll and Remember (an oldies program); founder of United Stations Radio Networks; substitute on American Top 40; radio station owner and disc jockey; top-40 music promoter	
April 23	Hal Jackson	96	Pioneering urban radio host, involved in several New York City radio stations	
May 4	Bob Stewart	91	Radio writer and host at WNEW and WNBC in New York; subsequently became known for his television work	
May 8	Bruce Baker	69	Country music radio personality at WKSN, WWSE and WHUG—Jamestown, New York	
May 9	Carl Beane	59	Radio host on WBZ-AM and public address announcer for the Boston Red Sox	
May 10	April Kaufmann	47	Talk show host on WOND—Atlantic City; shot dead	
June 18	Jim Packard	70	Wisconsin Public Radio producer/host and announcer for Michael Feldman's Whad'Ya Know?	
July 16	Kitty Wells	92	Frequent guest on the Grand Ole Opry and the Louisiana Hayride, pioneering female country music singer	
July 27	Joe "Butterball" Tamburro	70	Air personality in the Philadelphia radio market (DJ/PD/MD at WDAS-AM & FM)	
August 20	Phyllis Diller	95	Comedian at KROW and KSFO in San Francisco, later known for her stand-up career and television appearances	
August 24	Dale Sommers	68	Pioneering truck-talk radio host known on air as "The Truckin' Bozo"	
September 12	Derek Jameson	82	English tabloid newspaper editor and broadcaster (BBC Radio 2)	
September 22	Tedi Thurman	89	Model and actress best known for her role as "Miss Monitor" on the NBC Radio program Monitor	
October 9	Budd Lynch	95	Play-by-play voice of the Detroit Red Wings	
November 16	Jefferson Kaye	75	Radio and television announcer (stations include WBEN—Buffalo, WKBW—Buffalo, WBZ—Boston, WPVI-TV—Philadelphia)	
November 21	Art Ginsburg	81	American chef whose syndicated short-form program, Mr. Food, was broadcast on television and radio outlets throughout the United States	
December 8	Jenni Rivera	43	Mexican-American singer-songwriter, actress, reality television personality/producer, and syndicated radio personality.	
December 8	Arnold Dean	82	American radio host (credits include WKRT—Cortland, WAGE—Syracuse, WTIC—Hartford)	
