= WJTQ =

- Pensacola, Florida; United States
- Broadcast area: Pensacola, Florida; Mobile, Alabama
- Frequency: 100.7 MHz (HD Radio)
- Branding: Jet 100.7

Programming
- Format: Classic hits
- Affiliations: Westwood One

Ownership
- Owner: Cumulus Media; (Cumulus Licensing LLC)
- Sister stations: WABD, WBLX-FM, WCOA, WDLT-FM, WGOK, WMEZ, WRRX, WXBM-FM, WXQW

History
- First air date: September 1, 1965 (as WCOA-FM)
- Former call signs: WCOA-FM (1965–1975); WJLQ (1975–1994); WWRO (1994–2000); WJLQ (2000–2012); WCOA-FM (2012–2014)
- Call sign meaning: "Jet"

Technical information
- Licensing authority: FCC
- Facility ID: 12143
- Class: C
- ERP: 100,000 watts
- HAAT: 520.5 meters (1,708 ft)
- Transmitter coordinates: 30°36′45.7″N 87°38′42.9″W

Links
- Public license information: Public file; LMS
- Webcast: Listen live; Listen live (via iHeartRadio)
- Website: pensacolasjet.com

WJTQ (100.7 FM) is an American commercial radio station serving the Pensacola, Florida, and Mobile, Alabama, markets. The station, established in 1965, is owned by Cumulus Media and its broadcast license is held by Cumulus Licensing, LLC. Its studios are in Pensacola and its transmitter is near Foley, Alabama.

== History ==
WJTQ was an automated beautiful music station when it debuted as WCOA-FM. In the mid-1970s the format was switched to Top 40 with live and local disc jockeys and moniker "Q100," with the call sign WJLQ. WJLQ is Pensacola's affiliate with Dan Ingram's Top 40 Satellite Survey. In the early 1990s, the branding was changed by Barry Richards to "Super Q 100.7" with an emphasis on rhythmic and dance music. As a hit music station, WJLQ competed at different times with WABB-FM and WKRG-FM, which were both Mobile stations. When new owners grew weary of the "Super Q" moniker, the station began a gradual shift to the adult contemporary format and returned to the familiar branding of "Q100.7".

WJLQ shifted from top 40 to adult contemporary in the early 1990s, maintaining its "Q100" identity. In 1993, WJLQ shifted to urban adult contemporary as "Magic 100.7", which lasted only about a year before the station became "Arrow 100.7" with a classic rock format on April Fools' Day 1994, with the WWRO call letters being assigned on April 22, 1994.

Classic rock lasted until September 2000, when the station reverted to Top 40, regaining the WJLQ call letters and heritage "Q100" branding. This time, however, WJLQ focused more on the Pensacola side, while sister station WYOK served Mobile as a separate Top 40 station. In 2003, the top 40 format moved exclusively to WYOK as "Hot 104" and WJLQ shifted to a Hot Adult Contemporary format.

After six years as a hot AC outlet, the station began stunting with a "Wheel of formats" known as "Storm 100" on the morning of Tuesday, November 3, 2009. On November 5, 2009 at noon, the station shifted to Top 40 as "i100, Today's Hit Music", mirroring similar (and Cumulus owned) contemporary hit radio stations KLIF-FM in Dallas, Texas and WNFN in Nashville, Tennessee.

On August 31, 2011, the station began stunting again, this time with TV show theme songs from the 1970s, 1980s and 1990s. It also advertised a change on Friday, September 2 at 1 pm, which at that time, WJLQ launched a 1980s/1990s adult hits format, branded as "Journey 100". The station began the "Journey" format with Journey's "Don't Stop Believin'".

On Monday, April 23, 2012, at midnight, WJLQ dropped its 1980s/1990s hits format after just eight months on the air and replaced it with an FM simulcast of sister station WCOA. The final song on the "Journey" format was "What You Need" by INXS. Cumulus also applied to change the station's call sign back to WCOA-FM, which it carried during the 1960s and early 1970s; the change of calls was accepted the day of the format change.

On February 28, 2014, WCOA-FM changed its format from news/talk to classic hits, branded as "Jet 100.7" under new call letters, WJTQ.

== HD radio ==
Cumulus Broadcasting began upgrading its stations to HD Radio broadcasting in 2005. One of the first ten stations to be upgraded was WJLQ.
