= KOAN (AM) =

Radio station in Anchorage, Alaska

- Anchorage, Alaska; United States
- Frequency: 1080 kHz
- Branding: Tu Familia Radio

Programming
- Language: Spanish
- Format: Contemporary Christian

Ownership
- Owner: Iglesia Pentecostal Vispera de Fin

History
- First air date: May 10, 1975; 51 years ago (as KANC)
- Former call signs: KANC (1975–1982); KTNX (1982–1985); KASH (1985–1988); KKSD (1988–1995); KASH (1995–2002); KUDO (2002–2013)

Technical information
- Licensing authority: FCC
- Facility ID: 12961
- Class: A
- Power: 10,000 watts unlimited
- Transmitter coordinates: 61°7′10″N 149°53′50.9″W
- Translator: 95.1 K236CG (Anchorage)

Links
- Public license information: Public file; LMS
- Webcast: Listen Live
- Website: tufamiliafm.com

KOAN (1080 AM) is a commercial radio station in Anchorage, Alaska. It is owned by Iglesia Pentecostal Vispera del Fin. Its studios are located on Business Park Boulevard in Anchorage, and its transmitter is located in South Anchorage.

KOAN is an Alaskan clear-channel Class A station, broadcasting with 10,000 watts with a non-directional antenna. Programming is also heard on 250-watt FM translator K236CG on 95.1 MHz.

== Programming ==
Hot Talk 1080 aired a talk radio format, with mostly syndicated programs, many from the Salem Radio Network. Weekday hosts include Dennis Prager, Larry Elder, Todd Schnitt, Alex Jones and Brian Kilmeade. It used to be the home station of “Last Frontier Evangelism Radio,” a Christian talk show hosted by self-designated, controversial Christian “pastor” and former U.S. Department of Energy security guard David Grisham. Weekends feature shows on money, health, home repair, travel, cars and cigars. Hosts include Rudy Maxa, Ric Edelman, Gary Sullivan and Lee Habeeb. Most hours begin with world and national news from Fox News Radio.

In November 2020, the conservative talk format was replaced with an all-Spanish music format.

== History ==
=== KANC era ===
In the early 1970s, Mt. Susitna Broadcasting Corporation applied to the U.S. Federal Communications Commission (FCC) for a construction permit for a new broadcast radio station. The FCC granted a permit for a new 10,000 watts station to broadcast as a clear-channel station on 1080 kHz. The new station was assigned the call sign KANC. After construction and testing were completed, the station was granted its broadcast license and began regular broadcasting on May 10, 1975.

KANC was launched with a "progressive" country music format. By 1979 the station had switched to a Top 40 radio format before shifting to "crossover country" music after the 1980 film Urban Cowboy touched off a surge in country's popularity across the United States.

In September 1980, KANC applied to allow the control of broadcast license holder Mt. Susitna Broadcasting Corporation to transfer from Media, Inc., to Yukon Broadcasting Company. The FCC approved the move on January 16, 1981. In June 1982, the KANC license and station assets were sold by the Mt. Susitna Broadcasting Corporation to Community Pacific Broadcasting through their Community Anchorage Broadcasting, Inc. subsidiary. The deal gained FCC approval on October 21, 1982, and formal consummation took place on November 15, 1982.

=== Era of change ===
The new owners had the FCC change the station's call sign to KTNX on November 16, 1982, while maintaining a format described as "continuous hit country". Still a country music outlet, the station's call sign was changed to KASH on December 10, 1985. Late in the 1980s, the station transitioned to a middle of the road/adult standards music format with a corresponding call sign change to KKSD on September 15, 1988.

In November 1991, Community Pacific Broadcasting applied to the FCC to transfer the KKSD license internally from its Community Anchorage Broadcasting, Inc., subsidiary to Community Pacific Broadcasting Company, L.P. The FCC approved the move on January 13, 1992, and the transfer took place on March 20, 1992. Station management had the FCC return the station to the KASH call sign on November 20, 1995.

In January 1997, Community Pacific Broadcasting reached an agreement to sell KASH to Capstar Broadcasting subsidiary Community Acquisition Company, Inc. The sale was approved by the FCC on March 13, 1997, and the deal completed on July 14, 1997. This began a series of internal moves that saw control of the license passed from Capstar Broadcasting Partnert, L.P., to Capstar Broadcasting Corporation effective July 21, 1997, and on to Capstar Radio Broadcasting Partners, Inc., on July 31, 1997, and Pacific Star Communications, Inc., in August 1997. (Capstar Broadcasting was itself acquired by Clear Channel Communications in October 1999.)

=== KUDO era ===
In August 1997, Capstar Broadcasting subsidiary Pacific Star Communications, Inc., made a deal to sell KASH to Chinook Concert Broadcasters, Inc. The FCC approved the deal on October 14, 1997. The new owners changed the format to progressive talk radio and had the FCC change the call sign to KUDO on January 25, 2002.

Former branding

In July 2005, Chinook Concert Broadcasters, Inc., contracted to sell KUDO to International Brotherhood of Electrical Workers Local 1547 through a holding company called IBEW Local 1547 Investments, LLC. The station sold for a total cash price of $244,000. The sale was approved by the FCC on September 19, 2005, and the transaction was completed on September 26, 2005. With a mix of syndicated and local programming, including shows hosted by Camille Conte and journalist Shannyn Moore, by late 2007 KUDO was the lowest-rated of the 22 radio stations in the Anchorage market.

On January 21, 2010, KUDO's provider of syndicated talk programming Air America Media filed for Chapter 7 Bankruptcy and ceased live programming the same night. Reruns of Air America's programming continued to air until Monday January 25 at 4 pm Alaskan Time. In December 2010, KUDO was taken silent and its local talk talent (including Shannyn Moore) shifted to the newly reactivated KOAN for its relaunch under the moniker "Fox News Talk 1020."

On June 6, 2011, KUDO returned to the air with a sports radio format, branded as "The Ticket" and affiliated with Fox Sports Radio.

In December 2011, the International Brotherhood of Electrical Workers (through their IBEW Local 1547 Investments, LLC, license holding company) agreed to sell KUDO and its assets for $5,000 to Falcon Broadcasting, LLC, which is owned and operated by local broadcaster Tettyana Sevvina Robbins. Her husband, Mike Robbins, has a significant financial interest in Anchorage radio stations KVNT (1020 AM), KZND-FM (94.7 FM), KMVN (105.7 FM), and KLEF (98.1 FM) plus a local marketing agreement to operate KMVV (104.9 FM). After overcoming several legal objections, the station's sale was authorized by the FCC on June 28, 2012. The assignment of the station's license was consummated on July 9, 2012.

=== KOAN era ===
On November 26, 2013, KUDO changed its format to talk, branded as "Hot Talk 1080", and changed its call sign to KOAN on December 2, 2013.

As of June 2021, KOAN is now broadcasting in a Spanish contemporary Christian format and ultimately branded themselves as Tu Familia Radio. Effective July 30, 2021, Falcon Broadcasting sold KOAN and translator K236CG to Iglesia Pentecostal Vispera del Fin for $450,000.
