= WEAG =

WEAG can refer to:

- Western European Armaments Group, a subsidiary of the Western European Union
- WEAG (AM), a defunct radio station at 1490 kHz which was located in Starke, Florida, United States, and operated from February 23, 1957 to December 10, 2012.
- WEAG-FM, a radio station at 106.3 MHz located in Starke, Florida, United States
- WIBC (FM), a radio station (93.5 FM) licensed to serve Indianapolis, Indiana, that held the call sign WEAG from 1986 to 1987
- WBCR (AM), a radio station at 1470 kHz located in Alcoa, Tennessee that formerly held the call sign WEAG
