= WJLQ =

WJLQ may refer to:

- WJLQ-LP, a defunct low-power radio station (97.9 FM) formerly licensed to serve Jackson, Alabama, United States
- WJTQ, a radio station (100.7 FM) licensed to serve Pensacola, Florida, United States, which held the call sign WJLQ from 2000 to 2012
