= WXBM-FM =

Radio station in Pensacola, Florida

Coordinates: 30.611°N 87.607°W

- Milton, Florida; United States
- Broadcast area: Pensacola, Florida; Mobile, Alabama
- Frequency: 102.7 MHz (HD Radio)
- Branding: 102.7 WXBM

Programming
- Format: Country
- Subchannels: HD2: WCOA simulcast
- Affiliations: Westwood One

Ownership
- Owner: Cumulus Media Inc.; (Cumulus Licensing LLC)
- Sister stations: WCOA, WJTQ, WMEZ, WRRX

History
- First air date: 1964

Technical information
- Licensing authority: FCC
- Facility ID: 32946
- Class: C
- ERP: 100,000 watts
- HAAT: 488 meters

Links
- Public license information: Public file; LMS
- Webcast: Listen Live
- Website: wxbm.com

WXBM-FM (102.7 MHz) is a country music formatted radio station in Milton, Florida owned by Cumulus Media Inc. through licensee Cumulus Licensing LLC. Its studios are located in Pensacola and its transmitter is located near Robertsdale, Alabama.
