= Bernie Dittman =

Bernard Sidney Dittman (September 3, 1927 – October 25, 2006) was the longtime owner, president, and general manager of radio stations WABB and WABB-FM in Mobile, Alabama. Since Dittman assumed ownership in 1959, WABB has been one of the longest running Top-40 radio stations in the United States.

== Career ==
Born in Ohio, Dittman's interest in broadcasting became known in the sales and marketing department of his family's appliance store in Cleveland, Ohio. He was involved in the purchasing of advertising time on local radio stations. When Dittman attended St. Louis University, he did not study broadcasting, but engineering. After earning his engineering degree, Dittman's interest in broadcasting kept him away from a career in engineering. His interest finally peaked when he decided to buy a radio station up for sale, with the help of a broker. Dittman found out that the Mobile Register was selling its country music station WABB. He seized the opportunity in 1959 and shortly after arriving in Mobile a year later, the station began broadcasting Top-40 music. The format was such a success in the 1960s that WABB added a new FM simulcast in 1973. Dittman and his staff encouraged drivers in a series of on-air promotions to install low-cost FM radio receivers. WABB-FM eventually continued the Top-40 format after the AM station switched to a news/talk format.

== Personal life ==
Dittman's service to his fellow man extended beyond FM radio receivers. Since he came to Mobile, the WABB Community Club Awards Program of Greater of Mobile has provided thousands of dollars in financial awards to local organization. The station's longtime sponsorship of the Greater Gulf State Fair in Mobile began in 1965, along with the long-running High Striker game, a charitable promotion at the entrance to the fair's Midway. For years Dittman was seen operating the game himself. The Alabama Deep Sea Fishing Rodeo (sponsored by WABB since 1970) the Senior Bowl, and the GMAC Bowl received financial support from Dittman and WABB through the years. Since WABB was the Emergency Broadcast System primary station for Mobile, Dittman and his radio staff kept residents informed during severe weather, especially during, and after hurricanes. Dittman had three daughters, Betsy, Stephanie, and Marsha with his wife Judith (Judy) Dittman. His wife Judith (Judy) died in August of 2022.

== Awards and honors ==
Dittman received numerous awards of recognition for his professional and public service over the years. In 2005, he was named Broadcaster of the Year by the Alabama Broadcasters Association.

== Death ==
In October 2006, Dittman had a stroke and was placed in a hospital. On the night of October 25, he died at the age of 79 following an illness that had begun just the week before. In the days following his death, friends and family expressed their feelings and shared memories of the man many came to know as someone who cared deeply for his stations, current staff, and former staff. Betsy Dittman succeeded her father after relocating from Chicago, Illinois to Mobile, fulfilling the promise Bernie Dittman had of never selling out in an age when a single corporation can own multiple stations and radio stations are mostly automated.

In 2012 the Dittman Family sold WABB-FM to Educational Media Foundation (EMF) for an undisclosed price. That station flipped to the EMF's Christian Contemporary network, K-LOVE, on March 1, 2012, and soon after adopted the callsign WLVM. (EMF would trade WLVM to Cumulus Media that July, and became WABD, re-adopting the CHR format and many elements of WABB-FM's past identity.) The EMF sale excludes WABB AM, which the Dittman family has chosen to retain for the time being.

Bernie Dittman's favorite song was The Beatles' Strawberry Fields Forever; the staff of WABB-FM played the song several times throughout the station's final day on-air as a public tribute to Dittman. It was also WABB-FM's penultimate song, the last having been the station's first, Stuck Inside of Mobile with the Memphis Blues Again by Bob Dylan.
