= WMEZ =

- Pensacola, Florida; United States
- Broadcast area: Pensacola, Florida; Mobile, Alabama
- Frequency: 94.1 MHz
- Branding: Hot 94.1

Programming
- Format: Rhythmic contemporary

Ownership
- Owner: Cumulus Media Inc.; (Cumulus Licensing LLC)
- Sister stations: WCOA, WJTQ, WRRX, WXBM-FM

History
- First air date: November 11, 1960; 65 years ago
- Former call signs: WPEX-FM (1960–1972)
- Call sign meaning: Station formerly broadcast easy listening music

Technical information
- Licensing authority: FCC
- Facility ID: 73256
- Class: C0
- ERP: 77,000 watts
- HAAT: 488 m (1,601 ft)
- Transmitter coordinates: 30.611°N 87.607°W

Links
- Public license information: Public file; LMS
- Webcast: Listen live
- Website: hot941pensacola.com

WMEZ (94.1 FM) is a radio station in the Pensacola, Florida, market owned by Cumulus Media Inc. through licensee Cumulus Licensing LLC. It broadcasts a rhythmic contemporary format using the name "Hot 94.1". Its studios are in Pensacola, and its transmitter is near Foley, Alabama.

== History ==
Mello-Tone, Inc., was formed and applied in March 1960 to build a new FM radio station in Pensacola. A construction permit was approved on June 23, 1960, and WPEX-FM began broadcasting on November 11, 1960, with musical programming including classical and standards. The license was acquired by Frederic T. C. Brewer in 1965; Brewer owned an electronics shop and a background music business. WPEX-FM became WMEZ on July 4, 1972, and it continued the beautiful music format for more than 20 years. As late as 1989, it was the highest-rated station in Pensacola.

In February 1997, Brewer sold WMEZ after 31 years to Patterson Broadcasting of Atlanta, its format having shifted to adult contemporary by 1992. Two months later, Patterson Broadcasting agreed to be acquired by Capstar.

Chancellor Media acquired Capstar for $4.1 billion in 1999, changed its name to AMFM, and then merged with Clear Channel Communications in a $23 billion transaction that October. However, WMEZ and WXBM-FM were earmarked for divestiture to resolve antitrust concerns along with 70 other radio stations. Clear Channel initially intended to sell the stations to Urban Radio, which fell apart; instead, Pamal Broadcasting acquired the pair for $43.95 million in October 2000. Pamal then sold the two stations in 2012 to Cumulus Media for $6.5 million, allowing it to focus on its stations in New York state and Vermont.

The adult contemporary format was dropped at noon on January 1, 2024, when WMEZ flipped to a rhythmic CHR format as "Hot 94.1".
