= Alabama Deep Sea Fishing Rodeo =

The Alabama Deep Sea Fishing Rodeo is a 3-day long saltwater fishing tournament in the island town of Dauphin Island, Alabama. It has been held every year since 1929, making it the oldest fishing tournament in the United States. Attracting over 4,000 anglers and 75,000 spectators annually, it is also the world's largest fishing tournament.

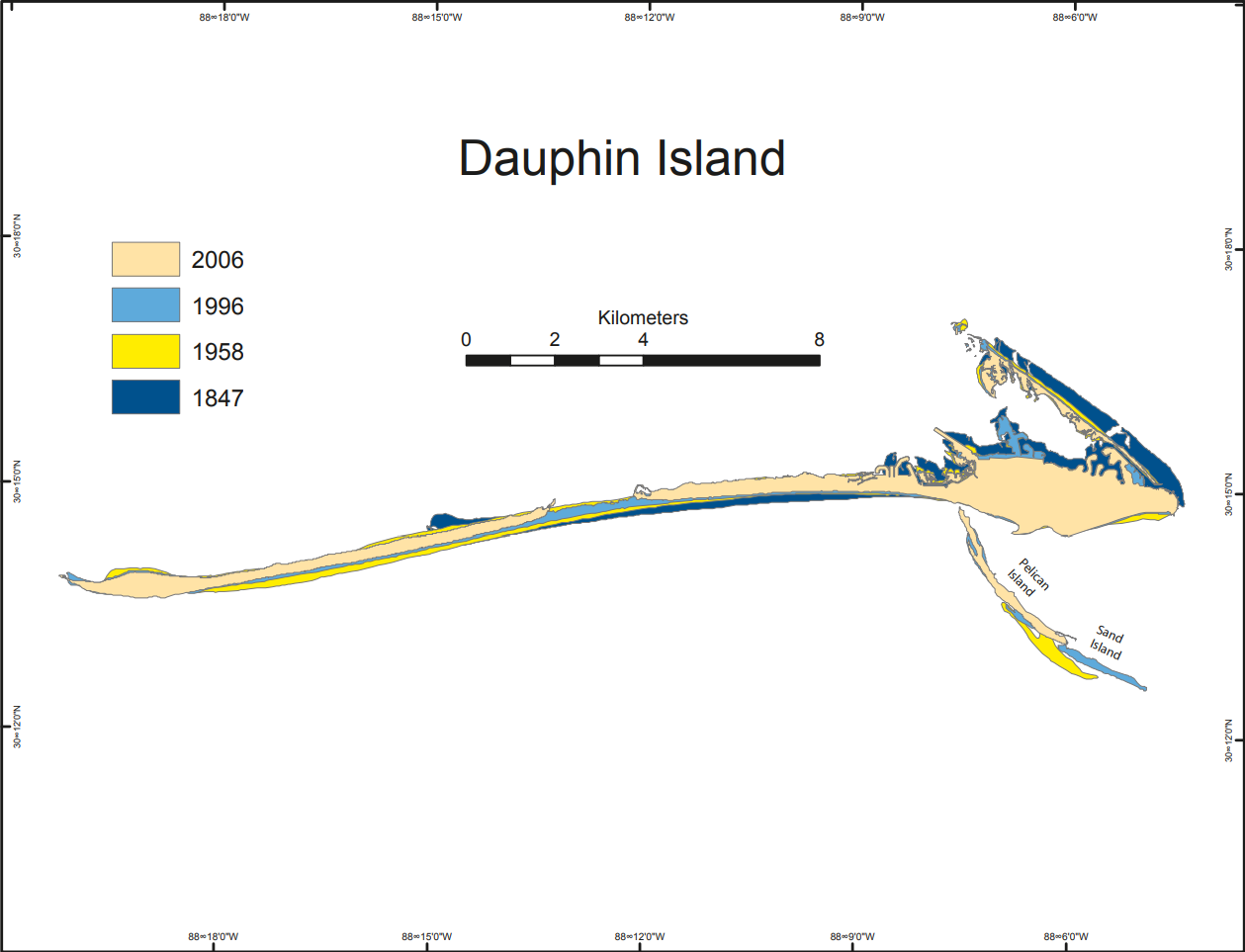

== History ==
The fishing rodeo was originally proposed by businessmen from the nearby city of Mobile in 1928, presenting the plan of a deep-sea fishing tournament to the Alabama State Game and Fisheries Commissioner Irvin T. Quinn. In its inaugural year of 1929, 260 anglers paid what was a $5 entry fee to compete in the tournament.

Steadily, more amateur anglers and professional teams alike began to compete in the tournament year-over-year, and both the entry fee and cash prize cool increased accordingly. In particular, the nationwide coverage that resulted from John McPhee's 1998 visit and subsequent publication titled "Catch and Dissect" in The New Yorker led to more out-of-state attendance and overall participation in the tournament.

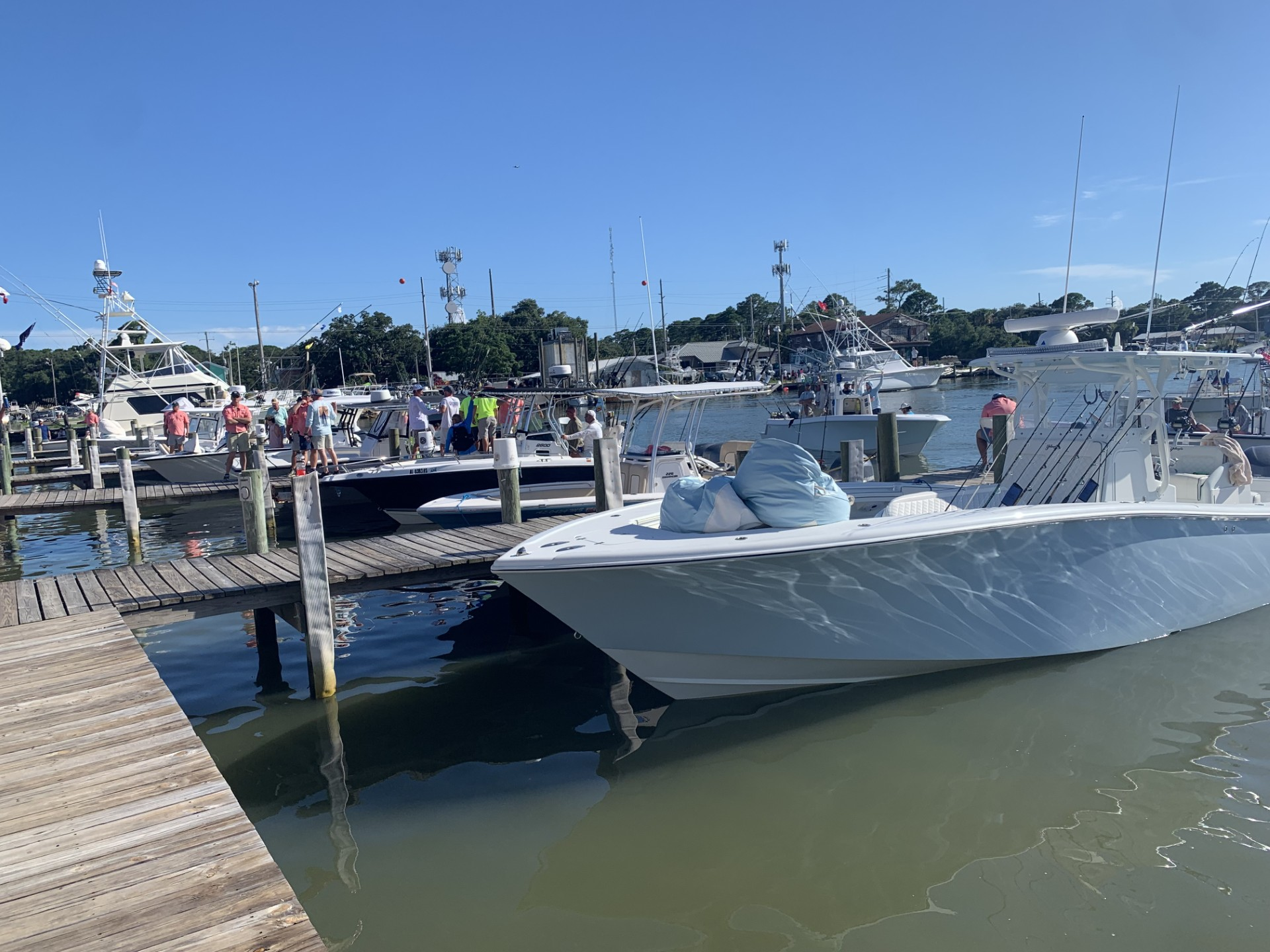

Currently, the project is overseen by the Mobile Jaycees, who organize the tournament proceedings which now include a wide range of prizes for each category, along with food, shopping, and entertainment offerings. Prizes are given to the first, second, and third place-finishers in each category. The current prize value available to competing anglers is $450,000. Entertainment includes live shows, concerts, and games and educational opportunities for kids.

== Categories and rules ==
There are currently 33 different categories in the rodeo. Amongst the most notable categories in the rodeo are the King Mackerel, "Speckled Trout," and Big Game, and large prizes such as boats, trailers, and the largest cash sums are awarded to the winners of these categories. The categories have changed over time in response to local fishing regulations, species classification changes, and controversies. There are live leaderboards for the categories, and there is also a jackpot in which an angler that weighs in a legal fish is selected at random to win a large prize that varies by the edition.

=== Shark category ===
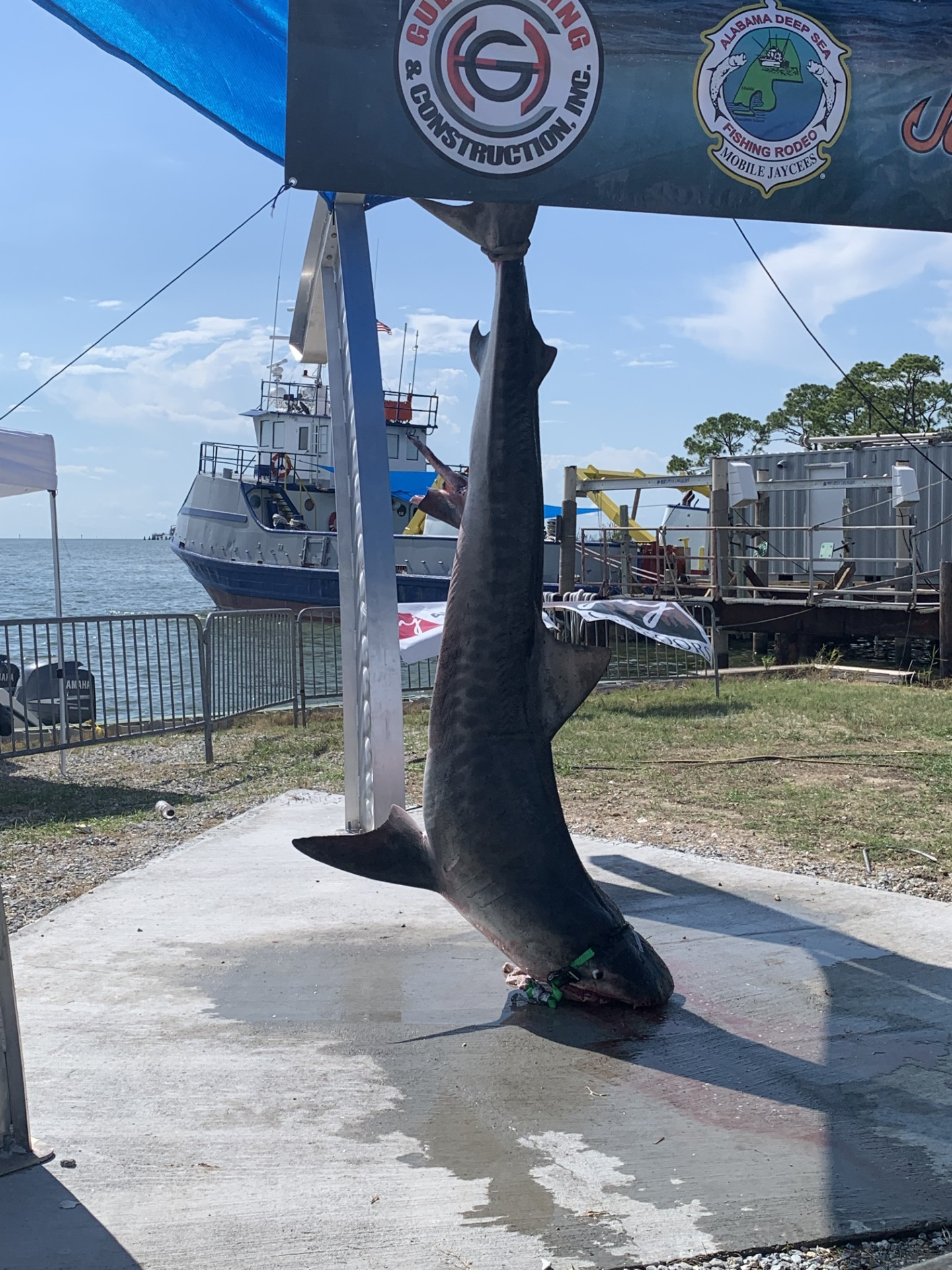

The category most famously removed due to community backlash is the shark category, which was removed in 2015. However, following an increase in shark populations throughout the Gulf of Mexico, the category was reinstated for the 89th edition of the rodeo in 2022. This was following pressure from anglers and spectators to bring it back, and fisheries experts including Dr. Marcus Drymon of Mississippi State University and Dr. Sean Powers of The University of South Alabama determined the local shark populations were stable enough to be harvested in accordance with local regulations.

=== Rodeo rules and weigh-ins ===
The Mobile Jaycees have an official, accessible list of rules and guidelines.

The main, general rules for participation in the rodeo include:

- Participants must pay $60 to compete.
- Participants must keep a copy of the rules in their boat.

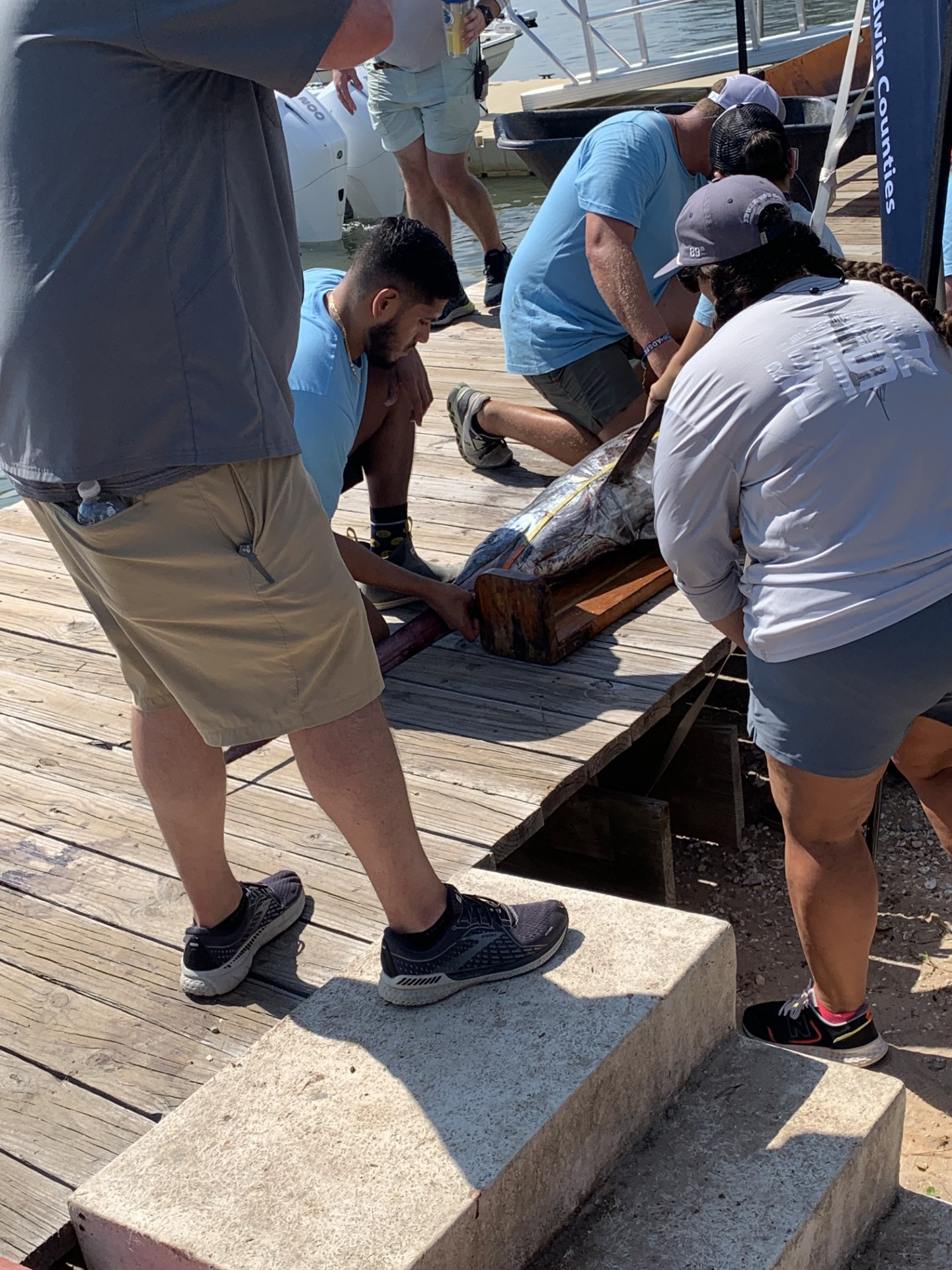

- Minimum lengths and maturities of species established by fisheries regulations must all be complied with or the fish will be deemed inadmissible, the anglers may be disqualified, and legal penalties may ensue.
- All fish must be caught in the officially specified territorial waters.
- All fish must be entered back at the rodeo site during the established hours for each day of the tournament.
- Once deemed admissible and the correct species, winners are determined based on the heaviest fish by weight in each category.
- Local experts, including Dr. Drymon and Dr. Powers, serve as the judges at the weigh-ins
- Jackpot tickets need to be purchased separately from rodeo rickets. Prices vary for each jackpot.

== Community impact ==
As an event that attracts over 75,000 people annually for the weekend, the rodeo is of critical economic importance to Dauphin Island and the surrounding Mobile community. The money raised in the tournament is also reinvested in the community, including in the form of scholarships for local students studying at nearby University of South Alabama. From the years 2015-2023, these contributions amounted to a total of $500,000.

== Research contributions and opportunities ==
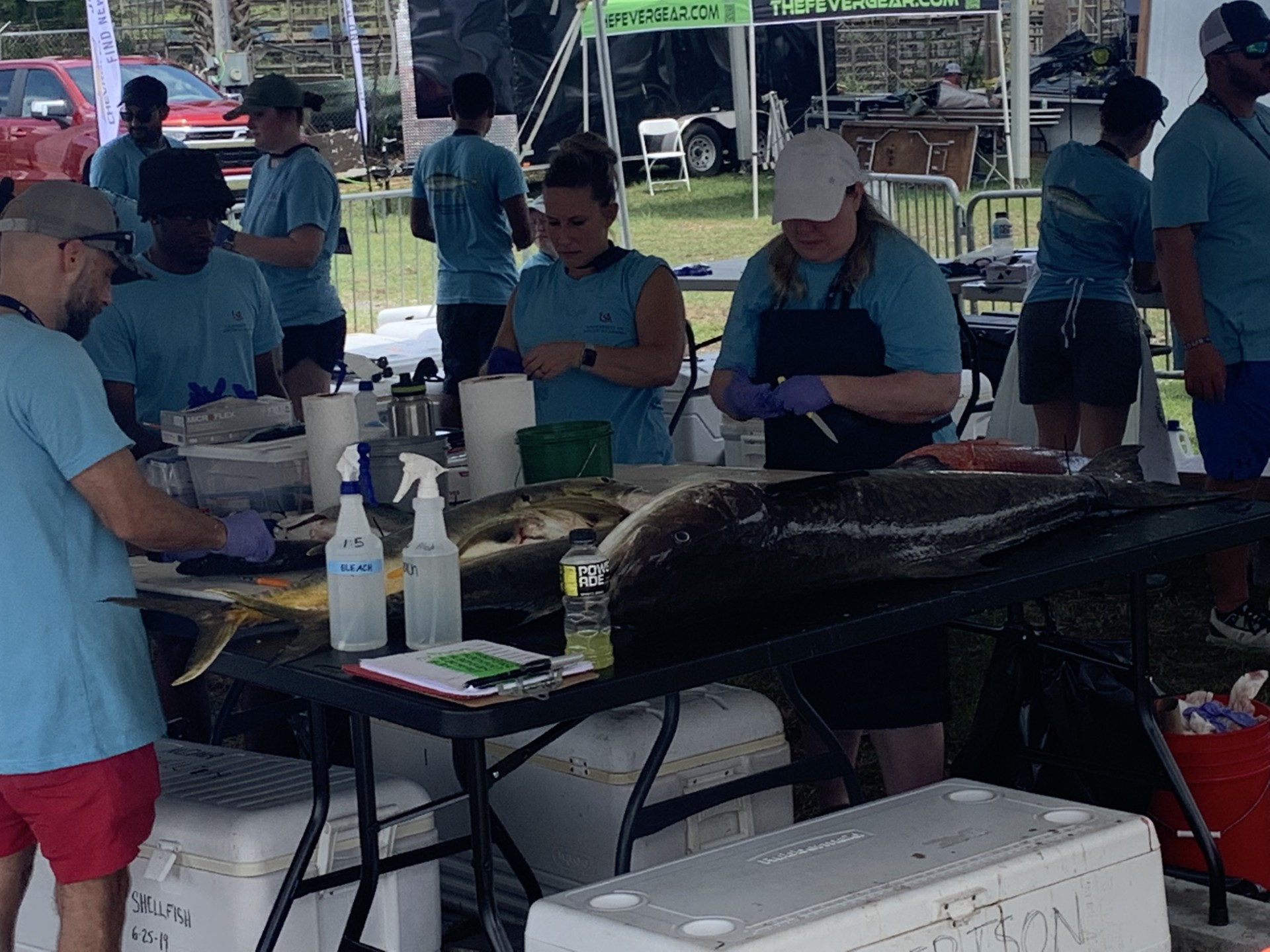

In striving to be "conservation minded" in the tournament, the Mobile Jaycees not only coordinate with local fisheries experts in each step of the process, but also collaborate with the nearby Dauphin Island Sea Lab, the University of South Alabama, Mississippi State University, and other local organizations to ensure research access is provided. This includes enabling the collection of data on numerous species present at the tournament, allowing scientists from these institutions to collect scientific samples from thousands of specimens. The data collected are highly beneficial to developing understandings of local population counts as well as greater knowledge of the species observed.
