= WEAG (AM) =

- Starke, Florida; United States
- Frequency: 1490 kHz
- Branding: Eagle Country

Programming
- Format: Defunct (formerly country)

Ownership
- Owner: Dickerson Broadcasting, Inc
- Sister stations: WEAG-FM

History
- First air date: February 23, 1957
- Last air date: December 17, 2012
- Former call signs: WRGR (1957–1963); WPXE (1963–1988)

Technical information
- Facility ID: 16907
- Class: C
- Power: 650 watts unlimited
- Transmitter coordinates: 29°55′50.00″N 82°6′16.00″W

WEAG (1490 AM) was a radio station broadcasting a country music format. Formerly licensed to Starke, Florida, United States, the station was owned by Dickerson Broadcasting, Inc.

The owners surrendered the station's license to the Federal Communications Commission on December 10, 2012. The FCC cancelled the license and deleted the WEAG call sign from their database on December 17, 2012.
