= WLVM =

K-Love radio station in Chickasaw-Mobile, Alabama

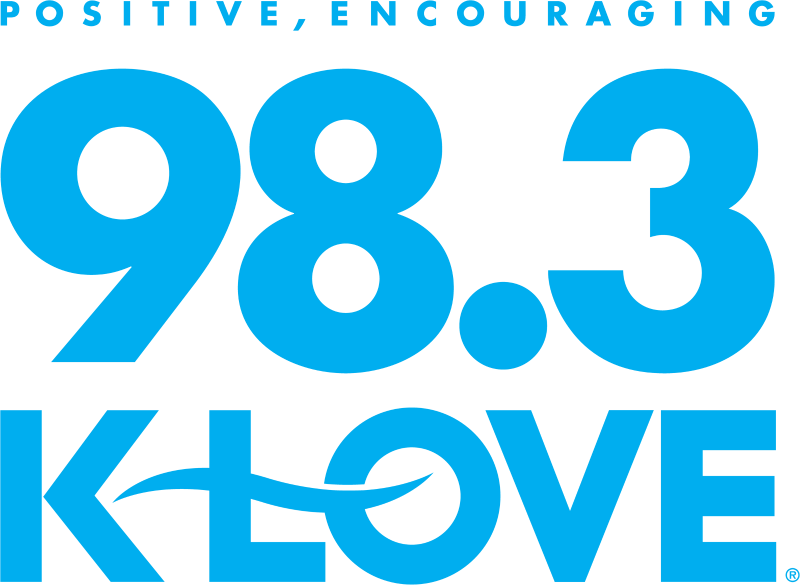
- Chickasaw, Alabama; United States
- Broadcast area: Mobile, Alabama
- Frequency: 98.3 MHz

Programming
- Format: Christian Contemporary
- Network: K-LOVE

Ownership
- Owner: Educational Media Foundation; (Educational Media Foundation)

History
- First air date: 1981 (as WJQY)
- Former call signs: WTUX (1980–1981); WJQY (1981–1984); WDLT (1984–1998); WDLT-FM (1998–2012)
- Call sign meaning: K-Love Mobile

Technical information
- Licensing authority: FCC
- Facility ID: 68843
- Class: C2
- ERP: 40,000 watts
- HAAT: 167 meters (548 ft)
- Transmitter coordinates: 30.585°N 88.266°W

Links
- Public license information: Public file; LMS
- Webcast: Listen Live
- Website: www.klove.com

WLVM (98.3 FM) is an American radio station licensed to serve the community of Chickasaw, Alabama, and broadcasting to the Mobile metropolitan area. The station is owned by the Educational Media Foundation.

== Programming ==
WLVM began broadcasting a Christian Contemporary music format branded as "K-LOVE" on July 15, 2012. The shift from the previous urban adult contemporary music format was a result of a multi-station deal that saw the programming formerly on WDLT-FM move to WABD (now WDLT-FM, 104.1 FM), the contemporary hit radio format on WABD moved to WLVM (now WABD, 97.5 FM), and the Christian programming on WLVM moved to WDLT-FM.

== History ==
In 1980, this station was constructed with the assigned callsign WTUX. By the time it signed on, the call sign had been changed to WJQY and the station operated as "Joy-FM", a light music station. Initial license holder was broadcaster W.H. ("Bill") Phillips, who opened the station on a tiny patch of land annexed to the city of Chickasaw that actually was located in Mobile. Programmed by radio personality Bob Martin from Detroit, Michigan, it transmitted with a 3,000-watt signal. Despite outperforming crosstown rival WLPR-FM in its first ratings period, the station's ownership decided to transition to a new country music format and renamed it "Q Country," facing tough local competition from market leader WKSJ-FM.

In January 1984, WJQY was sold by Phillips Radio Inc. to EJM Broadcasting, owned by New Orleans, Louisiana, broadcaster Ed Muniz. The call sign was changed to WDLT on February 15, 1984, and the format was switched to light rock. The staff underwent changes, with Bob Martin moving to WKSJ-FM (as personality Kelly Martin) and later shifting to WMXC (as Robert Gauge), with a brief return to WOMC-FM in Detroit, Michigan.

In July 1986, EJM Broadcasting sold WDLT to JAB Broadcasting Co., owned by J. Alex Bowab. One year later, in July 1987, control of the station transferred from JAB Broadcasting Co. to JAB Broadcasting Inc.

The station changed hands in July 1992 from JAB Broadcasting Inc. to United Broadcasting, Inc. The new owners adopted an Urban Adult Contemporary/Jazz format. In August 1993, a new transmitter and an authorization to increase the ERP to 6,000 watts boosted coverage.

In May 1997 United Broadcasting reached an agreement to sell WDLT to April Broadcasting, Inc. The deal was approved by the FCC on July 8, 1997, and the transaction was consummated on October 31, 1997.

When AM sister station WHOZ changed its callsign to WDLT, the FM station was assigned the WDLT-FM callsigns by the Federal Communications Commission on January 31, 1998. (That AM station changed callsign again in 2007, first to WWFF then to the current WXQW.) In October 1999, control of WDLT-FM was transferred from M&F Associates L.P. to Cumulus Media, Inc.

On July 9, 2012, Cumulus Broadcasting announced that WLVM (97.5 FM) had been sold by the Educational Media Foundation to its holding company, Cumulus Licensing, LLC, as part of a multi-station deal. As a result, several format shifts were scheduled to take place simultaneously at noon on July 15, 2012. The urban AC format on WDLT-FM moved to WABD (now WDLT-FM, 104.1 FM), the CHR format on WABD moved to WLVM (now WABD, 97.5 FM), and the Christian programming on WLVM moved to WDLT-FM (now WLVM, 98.3 FM). The FCC accepted the WLVM license transfer application on July 10, 2012, and changed its call sign to WABD on July 16, 2012, but as of July 17, 2012, had yet to approve the sale of the station. WABD and WDLT-FM are being operated under local marketing agreements until the sales are approved and the transactions consummated.
