= WCOA (AM) =

- Pensacola, Florida; United States
- Broadcast area: Emerald Coast
- Frequency: 1370 kHz
- Branding: WCOA News Talk 104.9 FM & 1370 AM

Programming
- Format: Talk radio
- Affiliations: ABC News Radio; Westwood One

Ownership
- Owner: Cumulus Media; (Cumulus Licensing LLC)
- Sister stations: WJTQ, WMEZ, WRRX, WXBM-FM

History
- First air date: February 3, 1926
- Call sign meaning: Wonderful City Of Advantages

Technical information
- Licensing authority: FCC
- Facility ID: 12142
- Class: B
- Power: 5,000 watts (day); 4,400 watts (night)
- Transmitter coordinates: 30°26′59″N 87°15′47″W
- Translator: 104.9 W285FY (Pensacola)
- Repeater: 102.7 WXBM-HD2 (Milton)

Links
- Public license information: Public file; LMS
- Webcast: Listen live
- Website: http://www.wcoapensacola.com

WCOA (1370 AM) is a commercial radio station licensed to Pensacola, Florida, United States, serving the Emerald Coast. It is owned by Cumulus Media and broadcasts a talk format. The studios and offices are on North W Street off Pensacola Boulevard (U.S. Route 29).

The transmitter is on Hollywood Avenue near Massachusetts Avenue in Brent, Florida.

== History ==
On February 3, 1926, hundreds of people gathered in Plaza Ferdinand in downtown Pensacola. They were there to hear the first sounds of radio in Northwest Florida. At precisely 8:30 p.m. WCOA went on the air, and the broadcast was piped over a large horn on top of City Hall. Locals who owned receivers could tune into the 250-watt signal that was broadcast from two 100-foot towers located behind City Hall.

City Clerk John E. Frenkel Sr., who used the moniker Breezy Boy from the Gulf, hosted the first program. It featured local talent, city officials and representatives of area military bases. The grand finale was a rendition of a song called "Down Pensacola Way" that was composed especially for the big unveiling. According to letters and calls, over 700 people listened to the first broadcast.

When the city government changed form in 1931, WCOA was purchased by John C. Pace for $6,500. When he purchased the station on December 1, 1931, he indicated he would spend $20,000 in modernizing the station. The studios were moved to the San Carlos Hotel where they remained until 1949. Pace eventually sold the station to the company that owned the Pensacola News Journal newspaper, which sold it in 1957.

The station increased its power to 5,000 watts September 8, 1947.

WCOA operated for many years as a network affiliate of NBC Radio. The programming featured middle of the road music, news and sports. The station's popularity grew. In 1956, when WCOA celebrated 30 years on the air, congratulatory telegrams were received from musicians such as Nat King Cole and Frank Sinatra.

The station changed ownership, location and network affiliation several more times over the years. In 1991, the programming switched to a news-talk format.

WCOA also has a place in the Congressional Record, recognizing the 80th anniversary of WCOA.

== Programming ==
Rick Outzen hosts the station's lone local program in morning drive. The rest of the schedule is nationally syndicated conservative talk shows, largely sourced from Westwood One.

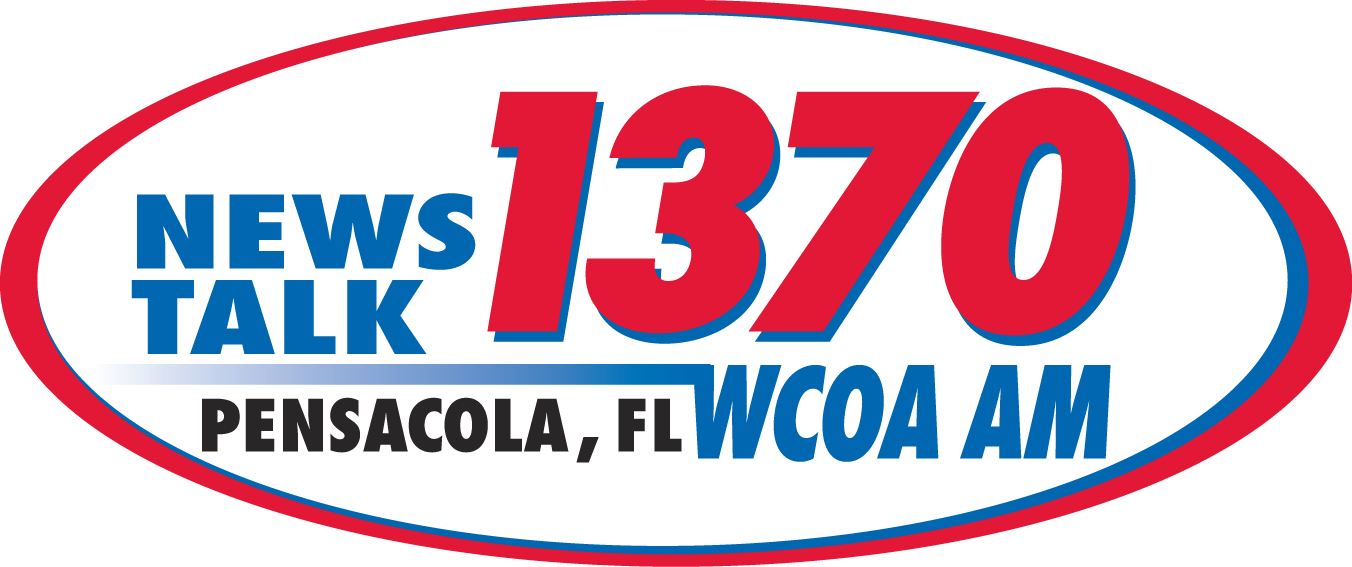
Logo before translator sign on
