= Alabama Commissioner of Game and Fisheries =

Former political position in Alabama

Commissioner of Game and Fisheries
- Formation: 1907
- Final holder: Walter B. Jones
- Abolished: ~1940 (Note: Final known mention of an incumbent commissioner)

The Alabama Commissioner of Game and Fisheries was an elected state constitutional officer in the U.S. State of Alabama. It was created in 1907 and the final election was in 1930.

== Selection ==
The position was an elected statewide position, with elections every four years. There are no records for elections after 1930.

== Responsibilities ==
The Commissioner designated hunting seasons for different species. The commissioner also appointed members to the Alabama State Conservation Board, beginning in 1935.
