= WBLX-FM =

Radio station in Mobile, Alabama

- Mobile, Alabama; United States
- Broadcast area: Lower Alabama/Florida Panhandle
- Frequency: 92.9 MHz (HD Radio)
- Branding: 93BLX

Programming
- Format: Urban contemporary
- Affiliations: Premiere Networks

Ownership
- Owner: Cumulus Media; (Cumulus Licensing LLC)
- Sister stations: WABD, WDLT-FM, WGOK, WXQW

History
- First air date: October 1, 1973; 52 years ago
- Former call signs: WBLX (1973–1988)
- Call sign meaning: A play on "Blacks", its target audience; see KBLX

Technical information
- Licensing authority: FCC
- Facility ID: 2540
- Class: C
- ERP: 100,000 watts
- HAAT: 520.5 meters (1,708 ft)
- Transmitter coordinates: 30°36′45″N 87°38′43″W

Links
- Public license information: Public file; LMS
- Webcast: Listen live
- Website: thebigstation93blx.com

WBLX-FM (92.9 MHz, "93BLX") is an American urban contemporary music-formatted radio station that serves Mobile, Lower Alabama, and Pensacola, Florida. The station has served the Gulf Coast for more than 50 years. Owned by Cumulus Media, its studios are on Dauphin Avenue in Midtown Mobile, and its transmitter is near Robertsdale, Alabama.

The station was assigned the WBLX-FM call letters by the Federal Communications Commission on July 4, 1988. In 2006, WBLX began broadcasting in IBOC digital radio, using the HD Radio system from iBiquity.

== History ==
WBLX began in October 1973 as FM counterpart to gospel station WMOO (1550 AM). As WBLX, with the CHUrban format and then as an Urban Contemporary format, has been one of the market's leading stations with the same calls and format for 45 years. In 1998, Cumulus acquired competitor WDLT-FM, and skewed it to being an Urban Adult Contemporary. This has allowed WBLX to skew its programming towards a younger audience as a Mainstream Urban. For many years, WBLX also carried "The Beat of the Bay 93BLX!" and "93BLX Jamz!" brandnames, however in 2000 they changed their current slogan to "The Big Station 93BLX".

Cumulus Broadcasting began upgrading its stations to HD Radio broadcasting in 2005. One of the first ten stations to be upgraded was WBLX-FM.

WBLX is one of the most powerful radio stations in the Gulf region. It can be heard from New Orleans, Montgomery, AL, South Georgia, Panama City, Fl, and 100 miles out in the Gulf of Mexico.
