= WGOK =

- Mobile, Alabama; United States
- Broadcast area: Mobile metropolitan area
- Frequency: 900 kHz
- Branding: WGOK Gospel 900

Programming
- Format: Gospel music

Ownership
- Owner: Cumulus Media; (Cumulus Licensing LLC)
- Sister stations: WABD, WBLX-FM, WDLT-FM, WXQW

History
- First air date: 1959
- Call sign meaning: OK Group (original owners)

Technical information
- Licensing authority: FCC
- Facility ID: 56716
- Class: B
- Power: 1,000 watts (day); 380 watts (night)
- Transmitter coordinates: 30°42′31″N 88°03′53″W
- Repeater: 104.1 WDLT-FM HD2 (Saraland)

Links
- Public license information: Public file; LMS
- Webcast: Listen live
- Website: gospel900.com

WGOK (900 AM, "Gospel 900") is a radio station serving the Mobile, Alabama, area with a gospel music format. The station is under ownership of Cumulus Media. Its studios are on Dauphin Avenue in Midtown Mobile, and its transmitter is northwest of downtown.

== History ==
The radio station in the early 1960s was located at 900 Gum Street right in the middle of a swamp. The station was part of the largest chain of black radio stations in the country called The OK Group. All of the stations in the OK Group had an OK at the end of their call letters, including WGOK in Mobile, KYOK in Houston, and WBOK in New Orleans. There were other OK stations in the cities of Memphis, Tennessee, and Baton Rouge, Louisiana, among others. There was one White station in Alice, Texas, with the OK reversed, KOPY.

Starting around 1959, WGOK was managed by Robert Irwin Grimes, Jr. He had been a radioman in the Navy, had served at Pearl Harbor on the USS Enterprise and was there in Hawaii on the day Pearl Harbor was attacked.

In the early 1960s disc jockeys had names like Topsy Turvey, Miss Mandy, and the Reverend A. J. Crawford. The station was very popular and played rhythm and blues records as well as gospel records.

Currently, it plays gospel music.

== Ownership ==
In 1999, the station was acquired by Citadel Communications Corp. (Lawrence R. Wilson, chairman) from Fuller-Jeffrey Broadcasting Co. Inc. (Robert Fuller, president) along with sister station WYOK for a reported sale price of $6 million.
