= Mr. Food =

American television chef (1931-2012)

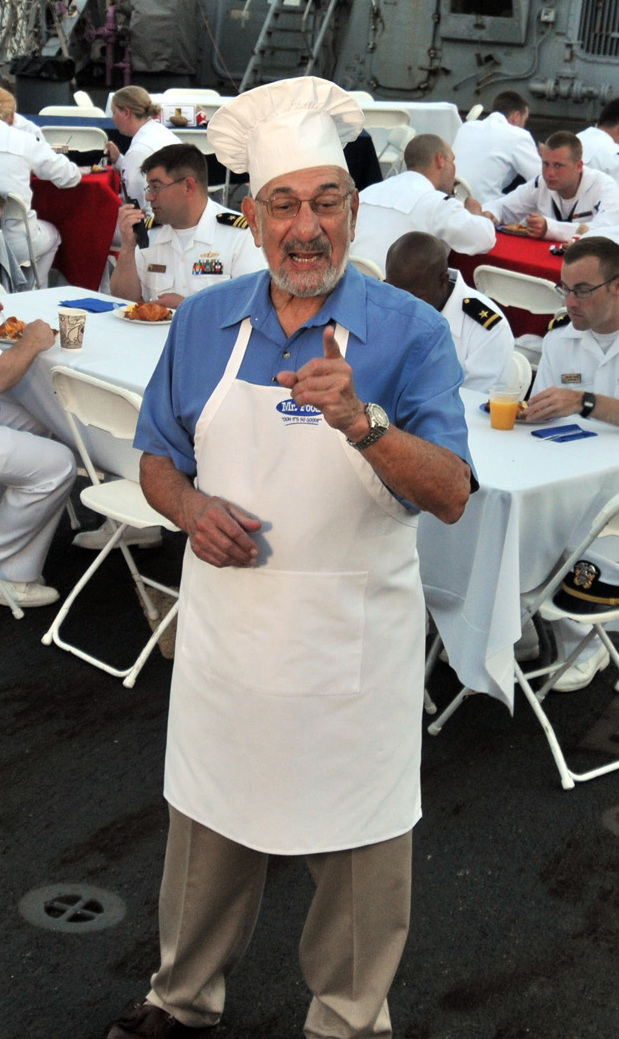
- Ginsburg in 2011
- Born: Arthur Ginsburg; July 29, 1931; Troy, New York, US
- Died: November 21, 2012 (aged 81); Weston, Florida, US
- Resting place: Beth David Memorial Gardens, Hollywood, Florida; 26.036°N 80.231°W
- Occupations: Celebrity chef; Author
- Years active: 1975-2012
- Spouse: Ethel Ginsburg (m. 1955)
- Children: 3

Art Ginsburg (July 29, 1931 – November 21, 2012), commonly known as Mr. Food, was an American television chef and best selling author of cookbooks. He was known for ending each of his TV segments with the catch phrase "Ooh! It's so good!" The signature phrase, as spoken by Mr. Food, is registered as a sound trademark with the U.S. Patent and Trademark Office. Ginsburg was a pioneer of "quick & easy cooking" who, for over 30 years, paved the way for other TV food personalities to follow. With his enthusiastic style, Mr. Food specialized in practical food preparation techniques, using readily available ingredients. He extolled an "anybody can do it" philosophy of cooking and remains today as one of the early pioneers of cooking on modern television.

== Early life ==
Arthur Ginsburg was born on July 29, 1931, in Troy, New York to Jewish parents who were deeply involved in the local meat trade. His father owned several butcher shops in the city.

== Career ==
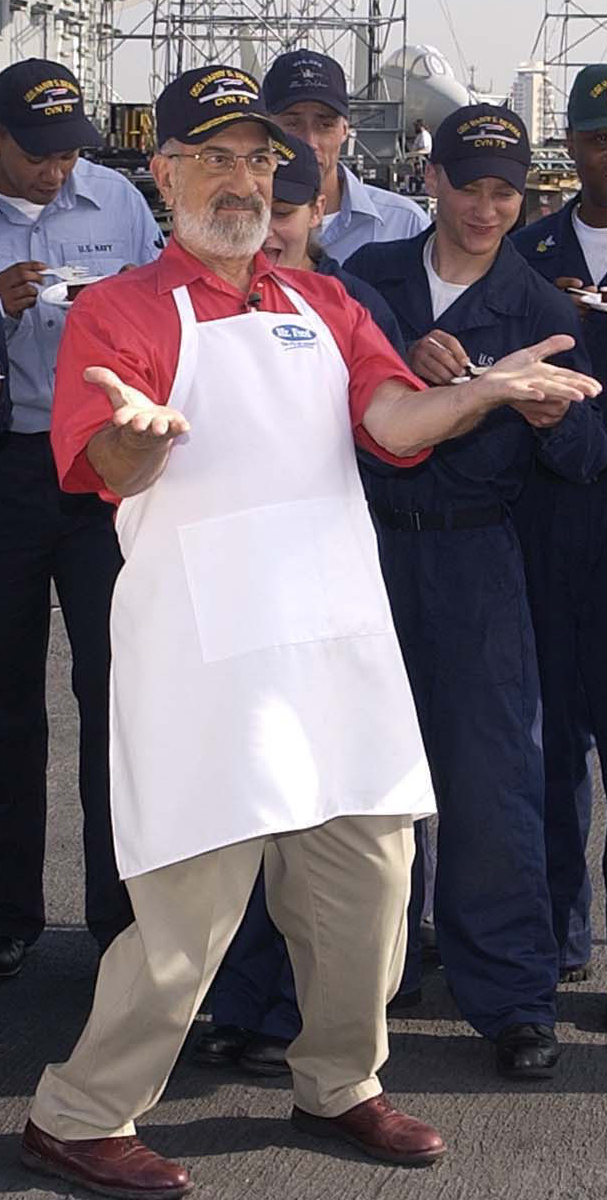
Ginsburg in 2002

Ginsburg was originally a butcher. He owned and ran a catering business prior to his work in television. In 1975, Ginsburg turned his flair for acting into a local television food program at WRGB in Schenectady, New York. It is believed that he filmed 1 or 2 episodes at KWWL in Waterloo, Iowa. By 1980, his 90-second Mr. Food segments were being syndicated to nine U.S. television markets, including WKBN-TV in Youngstown, Ohio, which still airs the "Mr. Food's Test Kitchen" segments today. At its peak in 2007, the program appeared on 168 television stations through King World Productions.

In addition to his television career, Ginsburg became a prolific writer, with 52 cookbooks published and sales of over 8 million copies. Three of Ginsburg's cookbooks were devoted to recipes for people with diabetes and published by the American Diabetes Association; one of these has also been published in Spanish. For his other cookbooks, he teamed with such notable publishers as William Morrow and Company, HarperCollins, Chicken Soup for the Soul Enterprises, and Oxmoor House, a division of Southern Progress Corporation and Time Warner. Since 2009, Mr. Food brand has self-published their own books.

Ginsburg was a co-host of the annual Variety Kids Telethon at WKBW-TV (a Mr. Food affiliate) in Buffalo, New York, to raise funds for Children's Hospital.

As he aged, Ginsburg stepped away from most of the daily operations of his company, Ginsburg Enterprises Incorporated. In addition to the Mr. Food segments, the company produced other segments called "Mr. Food's Test Kitchen" (in which he did not appear). It also produced his line of cookware.

== Death ==
Ginsburg was diagnosed with pancreatic cancer in 2011. He underwent treatments, including surgery, which caused the cancer to go into remission. However, it returned in early November 2012. Ginsburg died at his home that he shared with his wife Ethel in Weston, Florida, on November 21, 2012. He was 81. On November 23, memorial services were held at B'nai Aviv Synagogue in Weston and he was buried at Beth David Memorial Gardens in Hollywood, Florida. The week following his death, the Mr. Food team produced a series of memorial broadcasts featuring his favorite recipes.

== Legacy ==
"Mr. Food's Test Kitchen" continues on most of the stations that originally carried Mr. Food, with Howard Rosenthal (chief operating officer of Ginsburg Enterprises) as the series' primary host.
