= KZND-FM =

Radio station in Houston–Anchorage, Alaska

Coordinates: 61.336°N 149.515°W

- Houston, Alaska; United States
- Broadcast area: Anchorage Metro
- Frequency: 94.7 MHz
- Branding: 94/7 Alternative Anchorage

Programming
- Format: Alternative rock

Ownership
- Owner: Robert and Tor Ingstad; (Last Frontier Mediactive, LLC)
- Sister stations: KMVN

History
- Founded: 1999, at 87.7 MHz
- First air date: March 30, 2006
- Call sign meaning: From "End"

Technical information
- Licensing authority: FCC
- Facility ID: 10770
- Class: C1
- ERP: 21,500 watts
- HAAT: 270 metres (890 ft)

Links
- Public license information: Public file; LMS
- Webcast: Listen Live
- Website: alternativeanchorage.com

KZND-FM (94.7 FM, "94/7 Alternative Anchorage”) is a commercial radio station licensed to Houston, Alaska, and broadcasting to the Anchorage metropolitan area. KZND airs an alternative rock format and is locally owned by Last Frontier Mediactive. Its studios are on Business Park Boulevard in midtown Anchorage, and its transmitter is on Golden Eagle Drive in Eagle River, Alaska. It shares its tower with KASH-FM 107.5.

== History ==
The station originally signed on as KZND-LP in 1999. At first, it broadcast on 87.7 FM. KZND-LP was a low power television station marketed as an FM radio station. It took advantage of the fact that the audio of TV channel 6 can be heard on 87.7 FM. But the station was limited in its power. On March 30, 2006, KZND-LP began to simulcast on 94.7 FM, at 21,500 watts. This significantly expanded the station's coverage area.

This simulcast also allowed the station to be included in the Arbitron ratings, as Arbitron did not rate LPTV stations. Secondly, some radios cannot tune to 87.7 FM, so ownership hoped that a more "mainstream" frequency would bring in new listeners.

On August 1, 2014, KZND shifted its format to active rock, branded as "Pure Rock 94.7 KZND". That lasted three and a half years.

On February 2, 2018, KZND flipped formats to alternative rock, as "94.7 KZND - Alaska's Rock Alternative".

On March 8, 2019, Alaska Integrated Media sold KZND and its sister station Rhythmic AC 105.7 KMVN to Robert and Tor Ingstad's Last Frontier Mediactive, a Fairbanks, Alaska-based radio company, for $1.25 million. The sale was consummated on May 31, 2019.

In May 2019, the station reverted to its former imaging as “94.7 The End”, debuting a new logo at that time.

On June 17, 2019, KZND changed its playlist to a more current-based Alternative sound. It unveiled a new logo and website, and rebranding as “94/7 Alternative Anchorage”.
