= WRRX =

Coordinates: 30.444°N 87.234°W

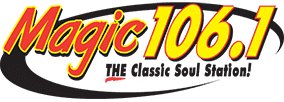
- Gulf Breeze, Florida; United States
- Broadcast area: Pensacola and Vicinity
- Frequency: 106.1 MHz
- Branding: Magic 106.1

Programming
- Format: Urban AC

Ownership
- Owner: Cumulus Media; (Cumulus Licensing LLC)
- Sister stations: WCOA, WJTQ

History
- Former call signs: WZRO (3/2000-4/2000)

Technical information
- Licensing authority: FCC
- Facility ID: 94009
- Class: A
- ERP: 3,900 watts
- HAAT: 124 meters (407 ft)

Links
- Public license information: Public file; LMS
- Webcast: Listen live
- Website: mymagic106.com

WRRX (106.1 FM) is an urban adult contemporary music formatted radio station in the Pensacola, Florida, market owned by Cumulus Media. Its studios and transmitter are separately located in Pensacola.

WRRX signed on in 2000 as WZRO with an active rock format as "Rock 106, Pensacola's Real Rock." Shortly thereafter, WZRO changed calls to WRRX. In 2004, WRRX changed format to Urban AC. It is one of two Urban ACs that Cumulus owns in the Gulf Coast area, the other being WDLT-FM in Mobile, Alabama.
