= Movin' (brand) =

The green circle MOViN' Logo used on most "MOViN" branded stations.

“Movin'” (capitalized as “MOViN'”) is a brand name used for a variety of rhythmic AC and top 40 radio stations in numerous broadcast markets in the United States. The name is a registered trademark of Alan Burns & Associates, a radio consultancy firm based in Perdido Key, Florida.

== Format background ==
This format started in the city of Seattle when hot AC outlet KLSY (Mix 92.5) became KQMV MOViN 92.5 on May 1, 2006.

"MOViN" stations played an upbeat dance-leaning rhythmic adult contemporary format and used the same logo, which features a hue of green circles (except for Norfolk, whose hues are brown and dark orange). Although the stations are consulted by Burns, some have carved their own niche and identity.

In most of the markets where the "MOViN'" stations were located, a series of television commercials featured women dancing to a montage of rhythmic hits. In the case of KMVN/Los Angeles, a customized version had morning host Rick Dees dancing.

Of the thirteen stations that adopted the "MOViN'" brand, one shifted directions but kept the name and jingle packages intact, with aforementioned KMVN shifting to rhythmic oldies with emphasis on '70s and '80s product. KMVN would later be joined by another convert, WYEZ/Myrtle Beach, South Carolina, who also adopted the same rhythmic oldies approach as KMVN, but with an extended library that includes '60s product.

Meanwhile, others began using a more current based model, as KMVQ/San Francisco, California and KYMV/Salt Lake City, Utah took their direction even further, both evolving to top 40 Mainstream in 2009. But after a year as a top 40, KYMV returned to rhythmic AC on June 11, 2010. Even the original "MOViN'", KQMV, has shifted to contemporary hit radio as it has refocused its direction on more current hits and less old school, likewise with KYMV.

Until late 2008, only a single "MOViN'" outlet had outright flipped formats, but since then, four more stations have dropped the brand. The first, KVMX/Portland, Oregon evolved to rhythmic contemporary in May 2008 as Jammin 107.5. Its former sister station, KMVK/Dallas, Texas, evolved to Spanish hot adult contemporary in February 2009, followed by WMUV/Jacksonville, Florida's flip to classic country that same month. The other, WMVN/St. Louis, began shifting towards an adult Hot Hits/CHR top 40 direction in 2007, only to drop the format in October 2008 for Christmas music until January 2009, when they flipped to sports radio. KMVN in Los Angeles dropped MOViN on April 15, 2009, and outsourced the station's operations to a Mexican radio network, Grupo Radio Centro, based in Mexico City. However, in April 2011 one station in Norfolk, WKUS, picked up the branding for their flip from urban AC, while the following September it saw KYMV dropping the brand for '80s-based variety hits. In August 2012, KNLT/Anchorage, the sister station of KMVV, picked up the format after latter dropped it in November 2011, reducing the "MOViN" brand to just three stations.

On December 26, 2024, at midnight, WMOV rebranded as "Party 107.7", leaving KQMV and KMVN as the remaining two stations still using the brand.

== See also ==
- KISS-FM, is also a brand of CHR/Pop (Top 40) radio stations, where unless they were under iHeartMedia, each individual station is independently operated. They are owned by iHeartMedia by a market by market basis. There are exceptions to this. For example, St. Cloud, Minnesota has a KISS station owned and operated by Regent, Milwaukee, Wisconsin has a KISS owned and operated by Entercom, and Charlotte, North Carolina has a KISS that until recently was owned and operated by CBS Radio. The KISS brand (WSKS/WSKU) is also being used by Roser Communications in the Utica/Rome, New York market.
- Froggy, is also a brand of country music radio stations, which are also independently owned and operated, and generally are unrelated with each other, but use the same or similar logo.
- Jack FM and Bob FM, are both a brand of radio stations that play a large variety of music from the '70s, '80s, and '90s.
- ESPN Radio, is also a brand of radio stations, where they are generally tied to the same set of broadcast programs, but are not all necessarily owned by the same operator. Most local broadcasts of these stations have nothing to do with the national network.

== US Stations ==
Note: these stations are in order by market size.

Station	Frequency	Region	Website	Debut	Format
KQMV	92.5	Seattle, Washington	http://www.movin925.com/	May 1, 2006	top 40
KMVN	105.7	Anchorage, Alaska	http://movin1057.com/	August 31, 2012	rhythmic hot AC

Many of the original US Movin stations have dropped the rhythmic AC format for top 40. Slogans for Movin rhythmic AC stations were/are "Makes You Feel Good", "Move To It" and/or "Picks You Up". The top 40 Movin format station called Movin 92.5's is "Seattle's #1 Hit Music Station". In 2011, Movin 107.7 flipped to a rhythmic AC format.

== Canadian Stations ==
Station	Frequency	Region	Website	Debut	Format
	102.5	Victoria, British Columbia	https://web.archive.org/web/20120426014145/http://www.movin1025.ca/	November 18, 2011	rhythmic AC

== Former stations ==
- KMVN (now KLLI)/Los Angeles, California
- KMVK/Dallas, Texas
- KVMX (now KXJM)/Portland, Oregon
- WMVN/Syracuse, New York
- WMVN (now WXOS)/St. Louis, Missouri
- WMUV/Jacksonville, Florida
- KMVA (now KGNN)/Phoenix, Arizona
- KMVQ/San Francisco, California
- KYMV/Salt Lake City, Utah
- KMVV/Anchorage, Alaska
- WTKN/Myrtle Beach, South Carolina
- WMOV/Norfolk, Virginia
