= KYKA =

Air 1 radio station in Anchorage, Alaska

Coordinates: 61.33806°N 149.5093°W

- Meadow Lakes, Alaska; United States
- Broadcast area: Anchorage, Alaska
- Frequency: 104.9 MHz

Programming
- Format: Contemporary worship music
- Network: Air1

Ownership
- Owner: Educational Media Foundation
- Sister stations: KAKL

History
- First air date: 2008
- Former call signs: KANC (2007–2008); KMVV (2008–2013)

Technical information
- Licensing authority: FCC
- Facility ID: 164296
- Class: C1
- ERP: 19,000 watts
- HAAT: 269.5 meters (884 ft)

Links
- Public license information: Public file; LMS
- Webcast: Listen Live
- Website: air1.com

KYKA (104.9 FM) is a radio station serving the Anchorage, Alaska, area. The station is currently owned by the Educational Media Foundation.

KMVV was the eleventh station in the United States to adopt the Alan Burns-consulted MOViN' rhythmic adult contemporary format. In November 2011, the station dropped the rhythmic AC format and began stunting with Christmas music as "Rudolph Radio". The rhythmic AC format returned briefly on December 31, but then the station went off the air at midnight on January 1, 2012. KYKA was sold to Educational Media Foundation in December 2012, and the station adopted the Air1 Christian contemporary hit radio format. On March 11, 2013, KMVV changed their call letters to KYKA.
