= WXQW =

- Fairhope, Alabama; United States
- Broadcast area: Mobile metropolitan area
- Frequency: 660 kHz
- Branding: Jox Mobile 660

Programming
- Format: Sports
- Affiliations: ESPN Radio

Ownership
- Owner: Cumulus Media; (Cumulus Licensing LLC)
- Sister stations: WABD; WBLX-FM; WDLT-FM; WGOK

History
- First air date: 1964
- Former call signs: WMOE (1964); WMOO (1964–1988); WLIT (1988); WBLX (1988–1996); WHOZ (1996–1998); WDLT (1998–2007); WWFF (2007)
- Former frequencies: 1550 kHz (1964–1988)

Technical information
- Licensing authority: FCC
- Facility ID: 2541
- Class: D
- Power: 10,000 watts (day); 19 watts (night)
- Transmitter coordinates: 30°35′50.7″N 87°52′58″W
- Repeater: 104.1 WDLT-FM HD3 (Saraland)

Links
- Public license information: Public file; LMS
- Webcast: Listen live
- Website: joxmobile.com

WXQW (660 AM) is a radio station licensed to Fairhope, Alabama, and serving the Mobile metropolitan area. The station is owned by Cumulus Media with studios on Dauphin Street in Midtown Mobile. WXQW carries a sports format, carrying local programming from WJOX-FM in Birmingham. The station's transmitter is sited in Daphne, Alabama.

The station began as a country & western outlet in 1964, later broadcasting contemporary Christian music, children's radio, urban contemporary gospel, all-news radio from CNN Headline News, blues music, and syndicated talk formats in its years on the air.

== History ==
=== Launch ===
In the early 1960s, Springhill Broadcasting, Inc., applied to the Federal Communications Commission (FCC) for a new AM radio station in Mobile which would be powered at 50,000 watts. It would broadcast on 1550 kHz as a daytime-only station, required to go off the air at sunset. The FCC granted the company a construction permit to build this new station and assigned call sign WMOE while construction was under way. Springhill Broadcasting was initially led by Marvin Burton as president and Samuel R. David as both vice president and general manager.

Assigned the new call letters WMOO, the station began licensed broadcast operations in 1964 with a country & western music format. By 1969, Samuel R. David took over as president of license holder Springhill Broadcasting. Under his leadership, Springhill Broadcasting reached a deal to sell WMOO to Trio Broadcasters, Inc. (George Beasley, president) which was consummated on December 17, 1969. The new owners flipped the format from country to southern gospel music with some Christian talk and teaching programs. This format was maintained through the 1970s and into the 1980s.

=== Move to 660 kHz ===
In March 1981, Trio Broadcasters, Inc., applied to the FCC to make extensive changes to the broadcast license for WMOO. The company applied to change the community of license from Mobile to Fairhope, to convert from daytimer status to a 24-hour operation with reduced daytime power plus nighttime service at 1,000 watts, to change broadcast frequency from 1550 kHz to 660 kHz, and to move the reconfigured antenna system to a new location just outside Daphne, Alabama.

The FCC accepted the filing on May 15, 1981, and finally granted a construction permit for these changes on September 26, 1984. This permit was scheduled to expire one year later, on September 2, 1985. After a long series of modifications and extensions, the station completed construction and applied for a license to cover these changes in August 1988. The FCC granted this request and the station began licensed operation on the new frequency from the new location with new operating hours and power levels on November 10, 1988. As part of these changes, the station requested a new call sign from the FCC. It became WLIT on January 24, 1988. That change proved short-lived as the station switched its call sign to WBLX on July 4, 1988.

The new WBLX was sold shortly after it was completed. Trio Broadcasters, Inc., reached a deal to sell the station to Central Life Broadcasting of Alabama, Inc., in September 1988. The FCC approved the sale on November 2, 1988, and the transaction was formally consummated on May 11, 1989.

=== 1990s ===
Less than a year later, in April 1990, a deal was reached to sell WBLX to April Broadcasting, Inc. The FCC approved the sale on July 23, 1990, and the transaction was formally consummated on October 31, 1990.

On October 4, 1996, the station's call sign was changed to WHOZ when the station flipped to children's radio as a network affiliate of Radio AAHS. The new format made its formal debut with a promotion at Bayfest on October 5, 1996. WHOZ became the first radio station in the Mobile metropolitan area to air a radio format designed for children. Unable to compete with Radio Disney, the entire Radio AAHS network discontinued programming in January 1998.

=== Cumulus era ===
On January 21, 1998, the FCC assigned this station the WDLT call sign. Cumulus Media agreed to purchase WDLT from April Broadcasting, Inc., in November 1999. After a legal challenge to the sale was dismissed, the FCC approved the sale on November 30, 1999, and the transaction was formally consummated the same day.

Nine years later, the station was briefly assigned the call letters WWFF on September 21, 2007. It switched to the current WXQW on December 31, 2007. This WXQW call sign was most recently used by a sister station (now WHRP, 94.1 FM) in the Huntsville, Alabama, market.

=== Switch to talk ===
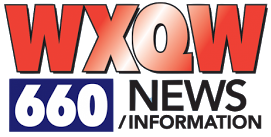
Logo as a talk station

On October 12, 2015, WXQW changed its format from urban gospel (simulcasting WGOK 900 AM in Mobile) to talk radio. It mostly carried nationally syndicated conservative talk shows from Westwood One, a subsidiary of Cumulus Media. They included Dan Bongino, Chris Plante, Ben Shapiro, Mark Levin, Michael J. Knowles, Red Eye Radio, America in The Morning and First Light. From Fox News Talk, Brian Kilmeade was heard in middays. National news from CBS News Radio began each hour.

=== Change in power ===
On January 20, 2016, WXQW was granted an FCC construction permit to decrease the night power to 180 watts. On January 4, 2017, WXQW filed an application for a construction permit to decrease night power to 19 watts. The application was accepted for filing on January 20, 2017.

In July 2025, WXQW changed its format from conservative talk to sports radio as "Jox Mobile". It carries Alabama-centered sports shows from co-owned WJOX-FM in Birmingham, with ESPN Radio airing nights and weekends.
