= WEAG-FM =

- Starke, Florida; United States
- Broadcast area: Gainesville, Florida
- Frequency: 106.3 MHz
- Branding: Eagle Country

Programming
- Format: Country

Ownership
- Owner: Florida Broadcast Media Group Inc

History
- First air date: February 28, 1978
- Former call signs: WPXE-FM (1978–1988)

Technical information
- Licensing authority: FCC
- Facility ID: 16906
- Class: A
- ERP: 2,700 watts
- HAAT: 151 meters (495 ft)
- Transmitter coordinates: 29°55′50.00″N 82°6′16.00″W

Links
- Public license information: Public file; LMS
- Website: WEAG-FM's website

WEAG-FM (106.3 FM) is a radio station licensed to Starke, Florida, United States, and airs a country music format using the moniker "Eagle Country". As of April 10, 2026, the station is owned by Florida Broadcast Media Group Inc.

== History ==
The station went on the air as WPXE-FM on February 28, 1978. On February 29, 1988, the station changed its call sign to the current WEAG-FM.

== Programming ==
WEAG-FM airs American Country Countdown with Kix Brooks.
