= WABD =

- Mobile, Alabama; United States
- Broadcast area: Mobile, Alabama; Pensacola, Florida; Biloxi, Mississippi
- Frequency: 97.5 MHz
- Branding: 97-5 WABD

Programming
- Language: English
- Format: Contemporary hit radio
- Affiliations: Westwood One

Ownership
- Owner: Cumulus Media; (Cumulus Licensing LLC)
- Sister stations: WBLX-FM; WDLT-FM; WGOK; WXQW

History
- First air date: February 5, 1973
- Former call signs: WABB-FM (1973–2012); WLVM (2012)
- Call sign meaning: Derived from WABB-FM

Technical information
- Licensing authority: FCC
- Facility ID: 70657
- Class: C
- ERP: 100,000 watts
- HAAT: 473 meters (1,552 ft)
- Transmitter coordinates: 30°41′20.6″N 87°49′48.9″W

Links
- Public license information: Public file; LMS
- Webcast: Listen live
- Website: www.975wabd.com

WABD (97.5 FM) is an American radio station licensed to serve the community of Mobile, Alabama. The station, established in 1973 as WABB-FM, is owned and operated by Cumulus Media. Its studios are on Dauphin Street in Midtown Mobile, and its transmitter is near Spanish Fort, Alabama.

This station began broadcasting a contemporary hit radio music branded as "97-5 WABD" on July 15, 2012. The shift from the previous "K-Love" branded Christian radio format was a result of a multi-station deal that saw the programming formerly on WLVM move to WDLT-FM (98.3 FM), urban adult contemporary programming on WDLT-FM move to WABD (now WLVM, 104.1 FM), the contemporary hit radio format on WABD move to WLVM (now WABD, 97.5 FM). On July 16, 2012, this station's legal call sign was changed by the FCC from WLVM to WABD.

== History ==
=== Early years ===
The station originally had its roots in WABB (1480 AM). WABB began broadcasting on June 19, 1948, when it was owned by the Mobile Register under call letters meaning "We are Alabama's Best Broadcasters". WABB was simulcast on FM from the very beginning, starting with 107.9 MHz and later 102.1 MHz until it was discontinued in the 1950s. Shortly after owner Bernie Dittman moved to Mobile from his native Ohio to join his father J.W. at the station in 1959, Top-40 music became the new format.

=== 97.5 WABB (1973–2012) ===
The modern WABB-FM on 97.5 signed on for the first time on February 5, 1973, with the song "Stuck Inside of Mobile with the Memphis Blues Again" by Bob Dylan. WABB-FM was originally a simulcast of its sister station before moving toward its long-running Top 40 format in 1984. Notable alumni of WABB include radio personalities Michael Scott Shannon and Leslie Fram.

WABB's longtime owner, president, and general manager Bernie Dittman died on October 25, 2006, after suffering from a stroke the previous week. Dittman's daughter Betsey succeeded him after relocating to Mobile from Chicago, Illinois.

=== Final WABB to "K-Love" (2012) ===
On February 17, 2012, the Dittman family announced on its website that it had decided to sell WABB-FM to Educational Media Foundation for $3.1 million. Following a day-long retrospective on the history of WABB, including its history on 1480 AM, on February 29, at Midnight, after bookending the station with the same song that launched 97.5 ("Stuck Inside of Mobile with the Memphis Blues Again" by Bob Dylan), the station flipped to the K-Love network, thus ending WABB-FM's 39-year run as a Top 40/CHR. The format would not be lost in the area, as Cumulus Media relaunched the format on its station on 104.1, with similar calls as WABD, at almost exactly the same time as WABB became K-Love. WABB-FM changed its call letters to WLVM on March 2, after EMF transferred the call sign from WKIW, the K-Love station in Ironwood, Michigan. The Dittman family chose to retain WABB (1480 AM) and the rights to the "WABB" callsign; however, they would later sell WABB AM to Omni Broadcasting on October 24, 2012, with the new owners changing its call sign to WTKD, following the flip to sports talk. Another broadcaster, Big Fish Broadcasting, reserved the "WABB" call letters for their silent AM radio station in Belton, South Carolina.

=== 97.5 WABD (2012–present) ===
On July 9, 2012, the Educational Media Foundation announced that WLVM had been sold to Cumulus Media holding company Cumulus Licensing, LLC, as part of a multi-station deal and that several format shifts would take place simultaneously at noon on July 15, 2012. The K-Love programming on WLVM moved to WDLT (98.3 FM), the urban AC format on WDLT moved to WABD (104.1 FM), and the CHR format on WABD moved to WLVM (97.5 FM). The FCC accepted the WLVM license transfer application on July 10, 2012, and changed that station's call sign from WLVM to WABD on July 16, 2012, with the first song on the new frequency being "Starships" by Nicki Minaj. The sale of the station was finalized the following week. WLVM and WDLT operated under local marketing agreements until the sales were approved and the transactions consummated.

=== Air staff ===
The station has gone through many personalities through the years. Currently WABD has two full-time local personalities. Jimmy Steele (program director) hosts mid days and Twiggins hosts afternoons. Twiggins has been with WABD since 2015 but got his start at the original WABB. Mornings became syndicated from Melbourne, Florida, in late 2016 by Tony Zazza and Cheree. The show is called "Zazza mornings with Cheree", and is broadcast in three markets (Melbourne, Florida; Fort Walton Beach, Florida; and Mobile, Alabama).
