= KMVN =

Radio station in Anchorage, Alaska

Coordinates: 61.336°N 149.516°W

Anchorage, Alaska; United States
- Broadcast area: Southcentral Alaska
- Frequency: 105.7 MHz
- Branding: Movin' 105.7

Programming
- Format: Rhythmic hot AC
- Affiliations: Premiere Networks

Ownership
- Owner: Robert and Tor Ingstad; (Last Frontier Mediactive Inc.)
- Sister stations: KZND-FM

History
- First air date: September 15, 1960
- Former call signs: KNIK-FM (1960–2009); KNLT (2009–2012)
- Former frequencies: 105.5 MHz (1960–1980); 105.3 MHz (1980–2000)
- Call sign meaning: "Movin"

Technical information
- Licensing authority: FCC
- Facility ID: 49628
- Class: C1
- ERP: 31,000 watts
- HAAT: 326 meters (1,070 ft)

Links
- Public license information: Public file; LMS
- Webcast: Listen live
- Website: movin1057.com

KMVN (105.7 FM) is a commercial radio station in Anchorage, Alaska. It airs a rhythmic hot AC radio format and is owned by Last Frontier Mediactive, Inc., headed by Robert and Tor Ingstad. KMVN's studios are on Business Park Boulevard in Anchorage.

KMVN is a Class C1 FM station with an effective radiated power (ERP) of 31,000 watts. The transmitter is on Golden Eagle Drive in Eagle River, Alaska.

== History ==
=== KNIK-FM ===
The station signed on the air on September 15, 1960. Its original call sign was KNIK-FM, the sister station to KNIK 1270 AM (now KBYR 700 AM). The call letters were a reference to the Knik River.

At first, KNIK-FM was only powered at 3,000 watts, broadcasting on 105.5 MHz, a Class A frequency limited in power and coverage area. KNIK-FM began by simulcasting with KNIK 1270. But after a few years, it broke away, airing its own beautiful music format. It played quarter hour sweeps of mostly automated soft instrumentals with some Broadway and Hollywood show tunes.

=== Smooth Jazz and Adult Contemporary ===
As the audience for easy listening was aging in the 1990s, KNIK-FM switched to a smooth jazz format. It was still soft music but designed for younger listeners.

KNIK-FM logo

On August 27, 2009, the station began stunting as a prelude to a format change. It played the top 100 songs of 1970 through 1989, one year per day. On September 15, 2009, KNIK-FM started playing what it called "Light Rock and Yesterday's Best Music," an adult contemporary music format, branded as "Lite 105.7". On September 16, 2009, KNIK-FM changed its call letters to KNLT.

=== KMVN ===
The AC format lasted three years. On August 31, 2012, at 2:00 PM, after playing "Mary Jane's Last Dance" by Tom Petty, KNLT flipped to Rhythmic AC, as "Movin 105.7". It launched with "Bust a Move" by Young MC. On September 18, 2012, KNLT changed its call sign to KMVN, to go with the "Movin’ 105.7 FM" branding.

On March 8, 2019, Alaska Integrated Media sold Alternative 94.7 KZND and KMVN to Last Frontier Mediactive. It is a Fairbanks, Alaska-based radio company, headed by Robert and Tor Ingstad. The price tag was $1.25 million. The sale closed on May 31, 2019.
