= WDLT-FM =

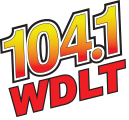
- Saraland, Alabama; United States
- Broadcast area: Mobile metropolitan area
- Frequency: 104.1 MHz (HD Radio)
- Branding: 104.1 WDLT

Programming
- Format: Urban adult contemporary/southern blues
- Subchannels: HD2: Gospel (WGOK); HD3: Sports (WXQW)
- Affiliations: Compass Media Networks; Premiere Networks

Ownership
- Owner: Cumulus Media; (Cumulus Licensing LLC)
- Sister stations: WABD, WBLX-FM, WGOK, WXQW

History
- First air date: May 19, 1966
- Former call signs: WATM-FM (1966–1980); WSKR (1980–1987); WIZD-FM (1987–1988); WGCX (1988–1994); WDWG (1994–1999); WYOK (1999–2012); WABD (2012); WLVM (2012)

Technical information
- Licensing authority: FCC
- Facility ID: 8680
- Class: C
- ERP: 100,000 watts
- HAAT: 508 meters (1,667 ft)
- Transmitter coordinates: 30°36′45″N 87°38′43″W

Links
- Public license information: Public file; LMS
- Webcast: Listen live
- Website: 1041wdlt.com

WDLT-FM (104.1 FM) is a radio station licensed to Saraland, Alabama, United States. The station, founded in 1966, broadcasts to the greater Mobile metropolitan area. The station is owned and operated by Cumulus Media. The WDLT broadcast license is held by Cumulus Licensing LLC.

WDLT's studios are on Dauphin Street in Midtown Mobile, and its transmitter is near Robertsdale, Alabama.

== Programming ==
This station began broadcasting an urban adult contemporary and Southern blues music format on July 15, 2012. On July 16, 2012, this station's call sign was changed to WLVM. The shift from the previous contemporary hit radio music format was a result of a multi-station deal that saw the contemporary hit radio format formerly on WABD move to WLVM (now WABD, 97.5 FM), the Christian programming on WLVM move to WDLT-FM (98.3 FM), and the urban AC programming on WDLT-FM move to WABD. (now WLVM).

E.J. Greig is the current Program director.

== History ==
=== Call letters ===
This station began broadcast operations on May 19, 1966, as WATM-FM. The call letters were changed to WSKR on October 6, 1980. On December 7, 1987, the call letters were changed to WIZD-FM, and then changed again on October 7, 1988, to WGCX Almost exactly six years later, on October 11, 1994, the Federal Communications Commission assigned the station new callsign WDWG. The station was assigned the WYOK call letters by the FCC on January 11, 1999.

On February 28, 2012, WYOK changed their call letters to WABD. On July 16, 2012, this station's call sign was changed by the FCC from WABD to WLVM. One week later, on July 23, 2012, the call sign was changed from WLVM to WDLT-FM.

=== Ownership ===
In June 1979, original owner Southland Broadcasting Company reached an agreement to sell WATM-FM to Talton Broadcasting Company of Escambia County. The deal was approved by the FCC on August 10, 1979.

In July 1984, Talton Broadcasting Company of Escambia County agreed to sell WATM-FM to Keymarket Gulf Coast, Inc. The deal was approved by the FCC on August 31, 1984, and the transaction was consummated on November 15, 1984.

In July 1988, Keymarket Gulf Coast, Inc., contracted to transfer the broadcast license for the station, then known as WIZD-FM, to Wescom of Alabama, Inc. The deal was approved by the FCC on September 22, 1988, and the transaction was consummated on October 3, 1988. The new owners had the callsign changed to WGCX.

In September 1994, Wescom of Alabama, Inc., reached an agreement to sell WIZD-FM to Capitol Broadcasting Company, LLC. The deal was approved by the FCC on November 16, 1994, and the transaction was consummated on December 6, 1994. While the sale was pending, the station's callsign was changed to WDWG.

In April 1997, Capitol Broadcasting Company, LLC, reached an agreement to sell WDWG to Clear Channel Communications subsidiary Clear Channel Radio License, Inc. The deal was approved by the FCC on November 21, 1997, and the transaction was consummated on December 31, 1997. As part of an internal reorganization, Clear Channel Radio License, Inc., agreed to transfer the license for WDWG to Clear Channel Metroplex Licenses, Inc., in December 1997. The transfer was approved by the FCC on December 18, 1997, and the transaction was consummated on December 31, 1997.

In August 1998, Clear Channel Metroplex Licenses, Inc., agreed to transfer the license for WDWG to Roberds Broadcasting's holding company WYOK Licenses, LLC, under president Kevin Wagner. The deal was approved by the FCC on December 7, 1998, and the transaction was consummated on January 5, 1999. The station's callsign was changed to WYOK just days later.

Roberds Broadcasting, through WYOK Licenses, LLC, agreed to sell WYOK to Cumulus Media subsidiary Cumulus Licensing Corp. in July 1999 for a reported $6 million as part of a two-station deal. The deal was approved by the FCC on October 18, 1999, and the transaction was consummated on February 18, 2000.

=== Programming ===
During the era as WATM, the station carried a beautiful music/easy listening format. In December 1987, the station flipped to adult contemporary as "Wizard 104" WIZD. Less than a year later, in October 1988, the station flipped to classic rock as "Gator 104" WGCX, eventually adding current rock into the playlist and shifting to AOR as "Rock 104." In 1994, the station briefly ran a country format as WDWG "104.1 the Dawg." The station was sold in 1995 and flipped to urban contemporary as "K104" WYOK. WYOK spent the mid- to late-1990s and early 2000s with an urban contemporary format (playing Hip-Hop, R&B, & Urban Gospel) and was the chief rival to WBLX-FM, the only other urban station in the Mobile, Alabama, market. But once Cumulus Media bought both stations, they switched to "Star 104" and began to go with more of a Top 40 music format, and was the main rival station to WABB-FM in the Mobile, Alabama market. With only one show beating WABB in ratings, The Rodman's Saturday Night Dance Party with Star 104 afternoon drive jock Rod "The Rodman" Cochran, WABB-FM hired "The Rodman" away from Star 104. Rod "The Rodman" Cochran is the only on-air personality to work on 104.1 under almost all of its different call letters, as WGCX and WYOK in its "Star" era. After briefly going to an all-80's format, they changed to "Hot 104" and another attempt at a Top 40 format.

WYOK then switched from "Hot 104" to "Kicks 104" and a country music format in April 2006. The new format signed on with notable on-air personality "Cadillac Jack" after two days of stunting with Lynyrd Skynyrd's "Sweet Home Alabama". Cadillac Jack left the station for Las Vegas' KCYE in September 2006.

WYOK's modern country format was dropped at 5 PM CST on March 18, 2009. The station then began stunting with a temporary format identified on-air as "TV 104.1" which played theme songs of popular classic television programs. Liners pointed to a change occurring on March 19 at 1:04 PM, and at that time, WYOK flipped to variety hits as "104.1 Jack FM". The station broadcast one of the Dial Global satellite-distributed versions of the Jack FM format, which is licensed to be broadcast in smaller markets. Jack104Online.com was registered on March 18, and was active before the format change. As of May 3, 2009, RDS-equipped radios still indicated a Country format for the station, but with "Jack-FM Playing What We Want" also being sent to the radios' displays.

On March 1, 2012, at midnight, after stunting with funeral bells for an hour, the Jack FM format was dropped in favor of CHR once again, this time as "104.1 WABD" under new call letters WABD. The change in format came as a result of WABB-FM being sold to Educational Media Foundation, which changed WABB-FM's longtime CHR format to EMF's Contemporary Christian network, K-LOVE, at the same time, with its calls changed to WLVM shortly afterward. The rights to the WABB callsign are retained by the Dittman family, which continues to own WABB AM. WABD's CHR format, branding, logo and callsign serve as a tribute to WABB-FM.

2012 branding

On July 9, 2012, Cumulus Broadcasting announced that WLVM (now WABD, 97.5 FM) had been sold by the Educational Media Foundation to its holding company, Cumulus Licensing LLC, as part of a multi-station deal. As a result, several format shifts were scheduled to take place simultaneously at noon on July 15, 2012. The Christian programming on WLVM moved to 98.3, the urban AC format of WDLT-FM moved to 104.1, and the CHR format on WABD moved to 97.5, (effectively returning to its "original" frequency; 104.1 ended the CHR format with "International Love" by Pitbull, as well as the first minute of "Firework" by Katy Perry, before fading into static, silence, and the famous Big Ben chimes). The FCC accepted the WLVM license transfer application on July 10, 2012, and changed that station's call sign from WLVM to WABD on July 16, 2012. The sale of the station was finalized the following week. WABD and WLVM operated under local marketing agreements until the sales were approved and the transactions consummated.

== HD radio ==
Cumulus Broadcasting began upgrading its stations to HD Radio broadcasting in 2005. One of the first ten stations to be upgraded was WYOK.
