= Mass media in Mobile, Alabama =

This is a list of mass media in the Mobile, Alabama, metropolitan area.

== Radio ==
=== FM ===
- 88.5 WBHY-FM Mobile (Christian Contemporary)
- 89.1 WPAS Pascagoula, MS (AFR Talk)
- 89.5 WPCS Pensacola, FL (Rejoice Broadcast Network)
- 90.3 WMAH Biloxi, MS (Public Radio)
- 91.3 WHIL Mobile (Classical)
- 92.1 WZEW Fairhope, AL (Adult album alternative)
- 92.9 WBLX-FM Mobile (Urban contemporary)
- 94.1 WMEZ Pensacola, FL (Soft AC)
- 94.9 WKSJ-FM Mobile (Country)
- 96.1 WRKH Mobile (Classic rock)
- 97.5 WABD Mobile (Contemporary hit radio)
- 98.3 WLVM Chickasaw (K-Love)
- 98.7 WYCT Pensacola, FL (Country)
- 99.9 WMXC Mobile (Adult contemporary)
- 100.7 WJTQ Pensacola, FL (Classic hits)
- 101.5 WTKX-FM Pensacola, FL (Rock)
- 102.1 WQUA Citronelle (Southern gospel)
- 102.7 WXBM-FM Milton, FL (Country)
- 104.1 WDLT-FM Saraland (Urban adult contemporary)
- 104.9 WBUV Moss Point, MS (Talk)
- 105.5 WNSP Bay Minette (Sports)
- 106.5 WAVH Daphne (Talk)
- 107.3 WRGV Pensacola, FL (Urban contemporary)

=== AM ===
- 540 WASG Daphne (Urban gospel)
- 660 WXQW Fairhope (Sports/ESPN)
- 710 WNTM Mobile (Talk)
- 840 WBHY Mobile (Religious)
- 900 WGOK Mobile (Gospel)
- 960 WLPR Prichard Religious)
- 1000 WJNZ Robertsdale (Talk)
- 1110 WTOF Bay Minette (Christian)
- 1220 WERM Fairhope (Gospel)
- 1270 WIJD Prichard (Talk/Religious)
- 1410 WNGL Mobile (Catholic)
- 1440 WVGG Lucedale, MS (Country)
- 1480 WABF Mobile (Adult standards)

== Television ==
Mobile is included in the Mobile-Pensacola-Fort Walton Beach designated market area, as defined by Nielsen Media Research, and is ranked 58th in the United States for the 2018-19 television season.

- 3 WEAR-TV Pensacola, FL (ABC, NBC on 3.2)
- 5 WKRG-TV Mobile (CBS)
- 10 WALA-TV Mobile (Fox)
- 15 WPMI-TV Mobile (Roar)
- 18 WDPM-DT Mobile (Daystar)
- 21 WMPV-TV Mobile (TBN)
- 35 WFGX Fort Walton Beach, FL (Independent with MyNetworkTV)
- 42 WEIQ Mobile (APT/PBS)
- 55 WFNA Gulf Shores (The CW)

== Print ==
Mobile's Press-Register is Alabama's oldest active newspaper, dating back to 1813. The paper focuses on Mobile and Baldwin counties and the city of Mobile, but also serves southwestern Alabama and southeastern Mississippi. Mobile's alternative newspaper is the Lagniappe. The Mobile area's local magazine is Mobile Bay Monthly. Mod Mobilian is a website with a focus on cultured-living in Mobile. MobileALnews.com is a local news website.

== See also ==
- Alabama media
  - List of newspapers in Alabama
  - List of radio stations in Alabama
  - List of television stations in Alabama
  - Media in cities in Alabama: Birmingham, Huntsville, Montgomery

== Bibliography ==
- "Alabama: Mobile". American Newspaper Directory. New York: George P. Rowell. 1900. hdl:2027/umn.31951002273861a.
- "Alabama: Mobile". American Newspaper Annual & Directory. Philadelphia: N. W. Ayer & Son. 1922. hdl:2027/umn.31951001295695n – via HathiTrust.
- Stephanie C. Hardin (1986). "Climate of Fear: Violence, Intimidation, and Media Manipulation in Reconstruction Mobile, 1865-1876". Gulf Coast Historical Review. 2. ISSN 0892-9025.

== Images ==
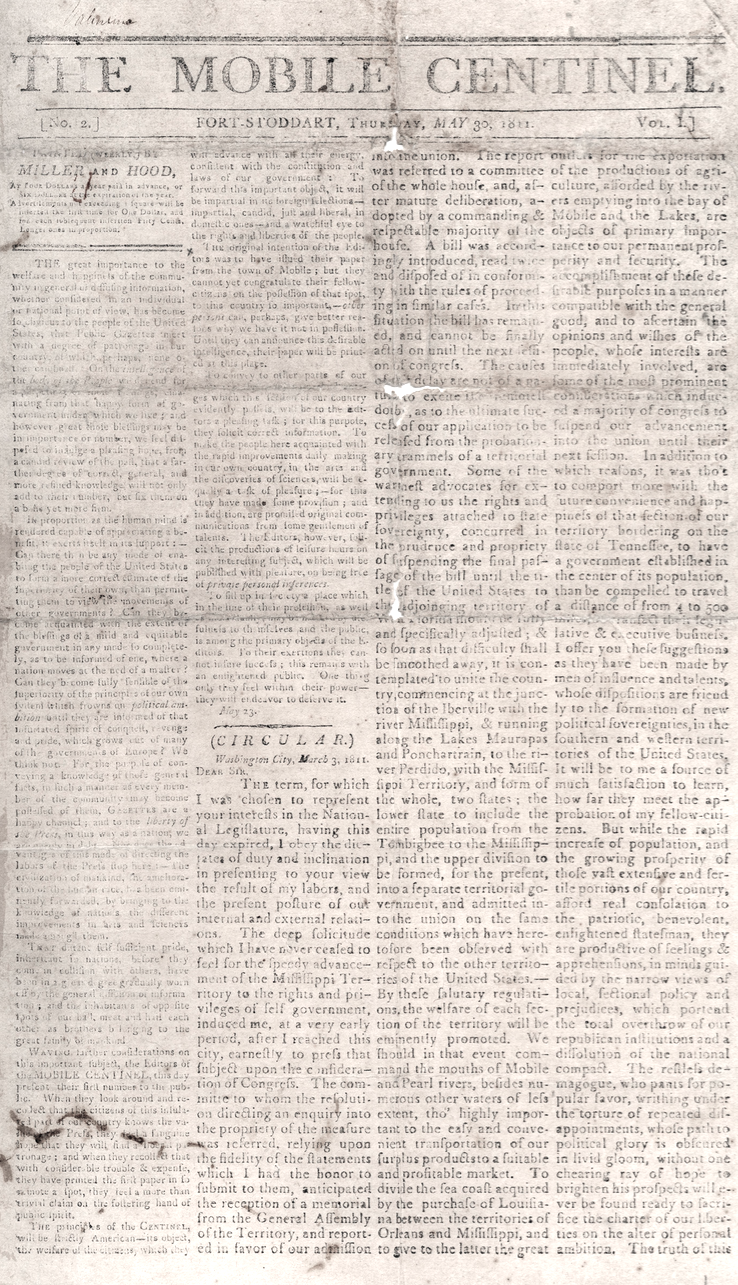
Issue of Mobile Centinel newspaper, 1811

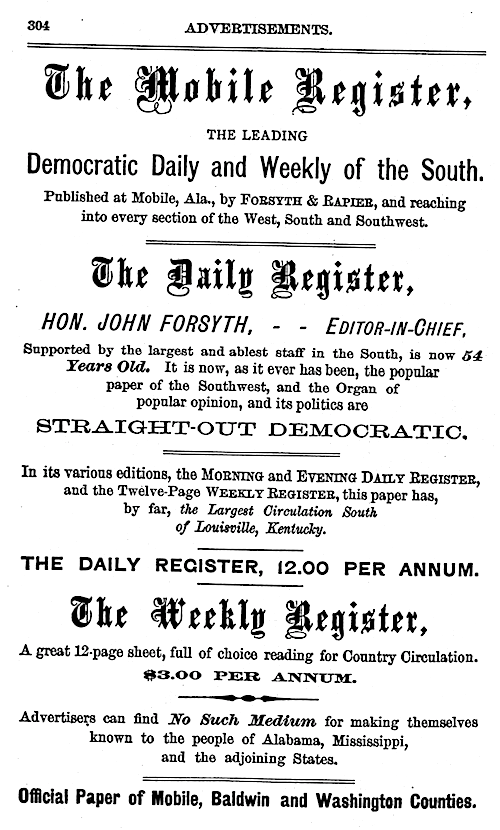
Advertisement for Mobile Register newspaper, 1875
