= Bob Sikes =

American politician (1906–1994)

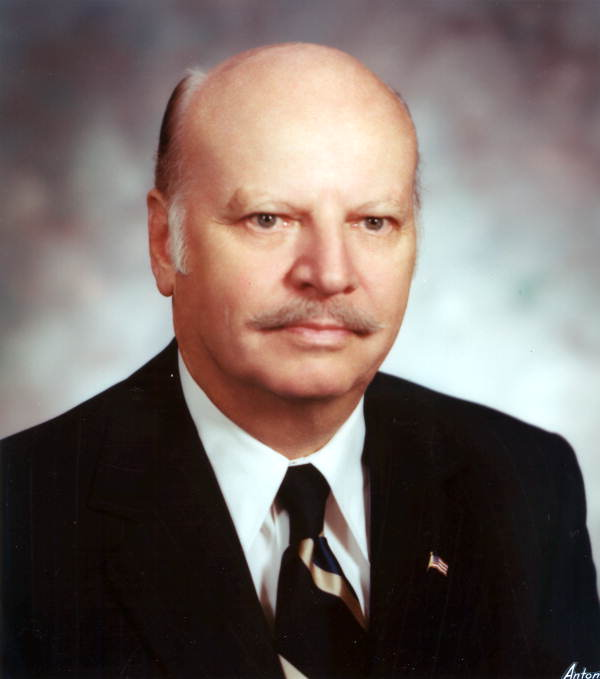

Member of the U.S. House of Representatives from Florida
- In office January 3, 1945 – January 3, 1979
- Preceded by: Himself
- Succeeded by: Earl Hutto
- Constituency: 3rd district (1945–1963); 1st district (1963–1979)
- In office January 3, 1941 – October 19, 1944
- Preceded by: Millard Caldwell
- Succeeded by: Himself
- Constituency: 3rd district

Member of the Florida House of Representatives
- In office 1937–1941

Personal details
- Born: Robert Lee Fulton Sikes; June 3, 1906 Isabella Station, Georgia, U.S. (now Sylvester)
- Died: September 28, 1994 (aged 88) Crestview, Florida, U.S.
- Party: Democratic
- Spouses: Mildred Tyner (m. 1949; div. 1983) Joan Thomas Dunning (m. 1983–1994)
- Children: 2
- Education: University of Georgia (BS); University of Florida (MS)

Military service
- Branch/service: United States Army
- Years of service: 1944
- Rank: Major
- Unit: U.S. Army Air Corps
- Battles/wars: World War II

Robert Lee Fulton Sikes (June 3, 1906 – September 28, 1994) was an American politician of the Democratic Party who represented the Florida Panhandle in the United States House of Representatives from 1941 to 1979, with a brief break in 1944 and 1945 for service during World War II.

During his tenure in Congress, Sikes supported racial segregation in the United States.

In 1975, Sikes was accused by Common Cause of financial misconduct and was investigated and censured by the House in 1976. He did not seek re-election in 1978.

== Career ==
Sikes entered the publishing business in Crestview, in the Florida Panhandle near Destin and Fort Walton Beach, working in that field from 1933 to 1946.

He soon became active in politics, joining the Democratic Party. At the turn of the century, the Democratic-dominated legislature had passed a new constitution and laws that disenfranchised most African Americans, crippling the Republican Party, of which they had been the majority. Sikes was elected in 1936 to the Florida House of Representatives, during the Great Depression and a landslide year for the Democrats, aligned with the popular President Franklin D. Roosevelt. Sikes was re-elected, serving until 1940.

=== Congress ===
Sikes was elected in 1940 to the Seventy-seventh Congress from what was then the 3rd District, and was re-elected to a second term in the Seventy-eighth Congress. His victory followed a bitter Democratic primary campaign. As Florida was then essentially a one-party state, most races were effectively decided in the Democratic primary.

=== World War II ===
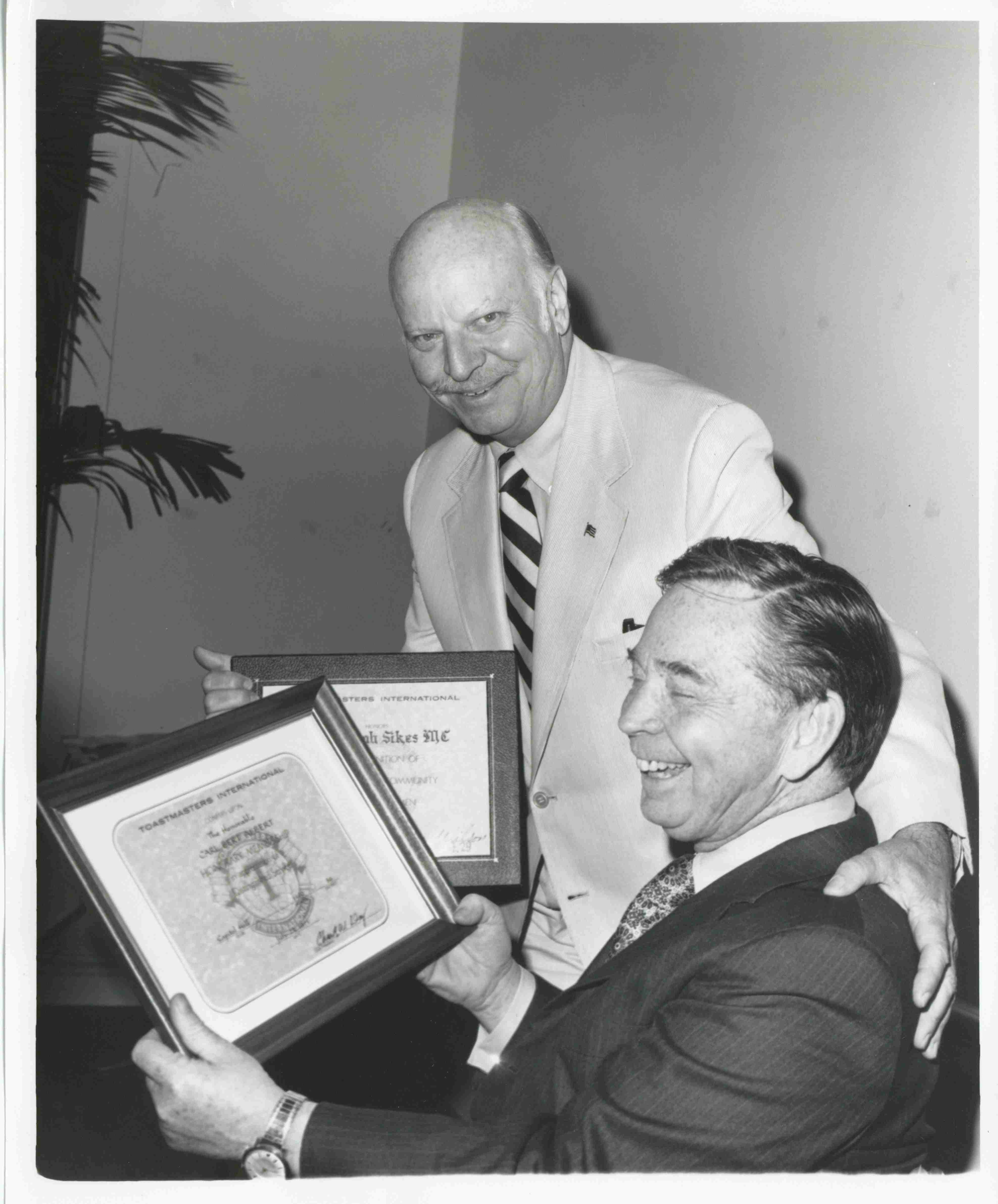
Sikes and Carl Albert.

Sikes served from January 3, 1941, until his resignation on October 19, 1944, to enter the United States Army during World War II. He was commissioned as a major. As a Congressman, Sikes had pressed for development in the state, including of Eglin Field as a test facility of the United States Army Air Forces, and later, the U.S. Air Force.

=== Return to Congress ===
When President Franklin D. Roosevelt ordered all legislators on active duty to return to Washington, Sikes ran for his old seat in 1944 and won. He served in the 79th and sixteen succeeding Congresses. After the war, Sikes was selected as a delegate to the Interparliamentary Conference in Warsaw, Poland, in 1959.

Sikes was a signatory to the 1956 Southern Manifesto that opposed the desegregation of public schools ordered by the Supreme Court in Brown v. Board of Education. Sikes voted against the Civil Rights Acts of 1957, the Civil Rights Acts of 1960, the Civil Rights Acts of 1964, and the Civil Rights Acts of 1968 as well as the 24th Amendment to the U.S. Constitution and the Voting Rights Act of 1965.

Sikes was a colleague of representatives Courtney W. Campbell, a fellow Democrat, and William C. Cramer of St. Petersburg, who defeated Campbell in 1954 to become the first Republican elected in Florida to the House delegation since 1880 after Reconstruction.

Sikes's district, which was renumbered as the 1st District in 1963, began moving away from its Yellow Dog Democratic roots after World War II. The district's voters began splitting their tickets as early as the 1950s, and voted for the Republican presidential candidate in every election from 1964 onward, except when the segregationist third-party candidacy of George Wallace won a majority in 1968. However, Sikes remained very popular at home. He never won less than 80 percent of the vote, and usually faced "sacrificial lamb" Republican challengers on the occasions he faced any opposition at all. In 1964, for instance, Sikes was reelected unopposed even as Barry Goldwater won the district by such a large margin it almost pushed Florida into the Republican column.

In Congress, Sikes became one of the most powerful men in Washington; he was often called "Florida's third Senator". He used his seniority to help build fourteen military bases in the Panhandle. He also had a reputation for strong constituent service, which garnered him the nickname "the He-Coon". Sikes said the nickname was derived from a Panhandle legend about a male raccoon that not only knew where food and water were, but also fended off his enemies and looked after his territory. As Sikes put it, a he-coon was expected to "look after those around him."

Along with Republican congressmen Jack Edwards of Alabama and Trent Lott of Mississippi, Sikes helped originate the Gulf Coast Congressional Report on WKRG-TV in Mobile, Alabama (the CBS affiliate for most of his district) in 1973. He left the program in 1979 upon his retirement.

== Reprimand ==
In 1975, Common Cause, a public-affairs lobbying group, accused Sikes of using his office for personal gain. He owned stock in First Navy Bank at Naval Air Station Pensacola, a bank that had been established by government officials at his urging, as well as in military contractor Fairchild Industries, which benefited from government contracts. He failed to disclose his interest in both these companies in the requisite financial reports. Sikes was reprimanded by a 381-3 vote of the House of Representatives on July 26, 1976, for the financial misconduct. Sikes, a strong conservative, believed "flaming liberals" had conspired against him.

== Later years, death and legacy ==
Sikes did not seek reelection in 1978 to Congress, having never lost an election in 45 years as an elected official. Upon his political retirement, Sikes returned to Crestview and devoted himself to his business interests. He died on September 28, 1994.

- Bob Sikes Bridge, connecting Gulf Breeze to Santa Rosa Island, is named after him.
- Bob Sikes Airport near the city of Crestview, in Okaloosa County, is named for him.
- Bob Sikes Elementary School, located in Crestview, Florida
- The Robert LF Sikes Center, located in Crestview, Florida is named for him (part of Northwest Florida State College).
- County Road 280, known as "Bob Sikes Road", connects U.S. Route 331 in DeFuniak Springs, FL to Florida State Road 285 in the west.
- Robert L. F. Sikes Library in Crestview

== See also ==
- List of federal political scandals in the United States
- List of United States representatives expelled, censured, or reprimanded

U.S. House of Representatives
Preceded by Millard F. Caldwell	Member of the U.S. House of Representatives from Florida's 3rd congressional district 1941–1944	Succeeded by Himself
Preceded by Himself	Member of the U.S. House of Representatives from Florida's 3rd congressional district 1945–1963	Succeeded by Claude Pepper
Preceded by William C. Cramer	Member of the U.S. House of Representatives from Florida's 1st congressional district 1963–1979	Succeeded by Earl Hutto
