= WBHY =

WBHY may refer to:

- WBHY (AM), a radio station (840 AM) licensed to Mobile, Alabama, United States
- WBHY-FM, a radio station (88.5 FM) licensed to Mobile, Alabama, United States
