= Woman's World (TV program) =

American television series

- Created by: Kenneth R. Giddens
- Starring: Connie Bea Hope; Estella Payton; Monica Knight; Jackie Richards
- Country of origin: United States

Production
- Running time: 30 minutes

Original release
- Network: WKRG-TV
- Release: 1955 – 1981

Woman's World is a lifestyle program that ran for more than two decades on WKRG-TV channel 5 in Mobile, Alabama. It was hosted by Connie Bea Hope and Estella Payton. It aired at noontime and lasted for 30 minutes. The show included guest appearances and interviews.

== Show history ==
Hope joined WKRG from its inception in September 1955 and began hosting Connie's Cupboard with Bea Hope, with Estelle Payton (1904–1999) as her assistant. In the early years, Payton, an African American, did not appear on camera unless her hands slipped into the shot while setting up or removing utensils. Later, in the 1960s, Payton began to appear on air. She was eventually given third billing on the program's opening titles, given her own microphone, and occasionally offered comments on Hope's demonstrations.

The show aired at the same time and in direct competition with Gulf Coast Today, a local women's show on WALA-TV hosted by Dot Moore. Woman's World was included in the Mobile Chamber of Commerce article celebrating WKRG's 50th anniversary, where it was listed as one of the TV station's favorite shows from the channel's early days of broadcast. Notable guests on the program included well-known celebrities, such as Michael Landon.

A columnist suggested in 2006 that the show was an example of Mobile's progressivity in race relations.

== Additional sources ==
- Herman W. Land Associates Inc. Television and the Wired City a Study of the Implications of a Change in the Mode of Transmission 1968, July (1111) ASIN: B000RL0X18
- Archival video footage of the show (bottom of page)
