= KPCS =

KPCS may refer to:

- Kevin Pollak's Chat Show
- Kiloparsecs, Units of measurement used in astronomy
- Kimberley Process Certification Scheme
- Korean Personal Communications Service
- KPCS (FM), a radio station (89.7 FM) licensed to serve Princeton, Minnesota, United States
