= WWAX =

WWAX may refer to:

- WWAX-LD, a low-powered television station (channel 27) licensed to serve Hartford-New Haven, Connecticut; a semi-satellite of WFSB
- WWPE-FM, a radio station (92.1 FM) licensed to serve Hermantown, Minnesota, United States, which held the call sign WWAX from 1996 to 2020
- WGMF (AM), a radio station (750 AM) licensed to serve Olyphant, Pennsylvania, United States, which held the call sign WWAX from 1987 to 1993
- WBHY (AM), a radio station (840 AM) licensed to serve Mobile, Alabama, United States, which held the call sign WWAX from 1982 to 1984
