= WRRD =

WRRD may refer to:

- WRRD (FM), a radio station (89.9 FM) licensed to Greensboro, Georgia, United States
- WGKB, a radio station (1510 AM) licensed to Waukesha, Wisconsin, United States, which held the call sign WRRD from 2008 to 2020
- WAUK, a radio station (540 AM) licensed to Jackson, Wisconsin, United States, which held the call sign WRRD from 2001 to 2008
- WLOL (AM), a radio station (1330 AM) licensed to Minneapolis, Minnesota, United States, which held the call sign WRRD from 1978 to 1980
- WCIS-FM, a radio station (105.1 FM) licensed to DeRuyter, New York, United States, which held the call sign WRRD from 1954 to 1961
