= WLPR =

WLPR may refer to:

- WLPR (AM), a radio station (960 AM) licensed to Prichard, Alabama, United States
- WLPR-FM, a radio station (89.1 FM) licensed to Lowell, Indiana, United States
