= KARJ =

KARJ may refer to:

- KARJ (FM), a radio station (92.1 FM) licensed to serve Escondido, California, United States
- KRRB, a radio station (88.1 FM) licensed to serve Kuna, Idaho, United States, which held the call sign KARJ from 2002 to 2017
