= WKSJ-FM =

- Mobile, Alabama; United States
- Broadcast area: Mobile, Alabama; Pensacola, Florida
- Frequency: 94.9 MHz (HD Radio)
- Branding: 94.9 95 KSJ

Programming
- Format: Country
- Affiliations: Premiere Networks

Ownership
- Owner: iHeartMedia; (iHM Licenses, LLC)
- Sister stations: WMXC, WNTM, WRGV, WRKH, WTKX-FM

History
- First air date: April 12, 1971
- Former call signs: WZAM-FM (1971–1972); WKSJ (1972–1973); WKSJ-FM (1973–1977); WKSJ (3/9/1977-9/19/1977)
- Call sign meaning: Kenneth S. Johnson (former owner)

Technical information
- Licensing authority: FCC
- Facility ID: 53145
- Class: C
- ERP: 98,000 watts 100,000 watts (with beam tilt)
- HAAT: 520.5 meters (1,707.7 ft)
- Transmitter coordinates: 30°36′45.7″N 87°38′42.9″W

Links
- Public license information: Public file; LMS
- Webcast: Listen Live
- Website: 95ksj.iheart.com

WKSJ-FM (94.9 MHz) is a radio station licensed to serve Mobile, Alabama, United States. The station is owned by San Antonio–based iHeartMedia and the broadcast license is held by iHM Licenses, LLC. Its studios are located inside the building of unrelated television station WKRG-TV on Broadcast Drive in Mobile, and the transmitter is near Robertsdale, Alabama.

WKSJ-FM broadcasts a country music format to the Mobile metropolitan area.

Notable programs include The Bobby Bones Show on mornings, Johnna on middays, Bill & Shelby on afternoons, Wayne D on nights, and the syndicated CMT After Midnite with Cody Alan from Premiere Networks overnight.

== History ==
=== Launch ===
On April 21, 1971, this station signed on as WZAM-FM under the ownership of Broadcast Enterprises, Inc., (who had in turn acquired it from the original permit holders Duke Broadcasting Co. on November 1, 1970) with 31,000 watts of power at 94.9 MHz. In 1972, the station changed its callsign to WKSJ. In 1973, former AM sister station WZAM (now WIJD) changed its callsign to WKSJ which forced a change in this station's call letters to the current WKSJ-FM. In 1974, the licensee changed to Capitol Broadcasting Corp.

For legal and accounting purposes, the licensee of WKSJ-FM applied to the FCC to shift the license from Capitol Broadcasting Corp. (A West Virginia Corporation) to Capitol Broadcasting Corp. (An Alabama Corporation) in December 1985. The transfer was approved by the FCC on December 24, 1985.

=== 1990s ===
In May 1992, Capitol Broadcasting Corporation agreed to sell this station to Franklin Communications Partners, L.P. The deal was approved by the FCC on July 16, 1992, and the transaction was consummated on September 30, 1992.

In October 1993, Franklin Communications Partners, L.P., reached an agreement to sell this station to WAVH-FM, Inc. The deal was approved by the FCC on December 13, 1993, and the transaction was consummated on February 15, 1994. This would prove to be a very short-lived ownership as in January 1994, WAVH-FM, Inc., reached an agreement to sell this station to Pourtales Radio Partnership. The deal was approved by the FCC on February 10, 1994, and the transaction was consummated on February 14, 1994.

In January 1996, Pourtales Radio Partnership reached an agreement to sell this station to Gardner Broadcasting, Inc. The deal was approved by the FCC on March 28, 1996, and the transaction was consummated on June 10, 1996. This ownership stint would also prove short-lived as in March 1996, Gardner Broadcasting, Inc., reached an agreement to sell this station to Capitol Broadcasting Company, LLC. The deal was approved by the FCC on May 8, 1996, and the transaction was consummated on May 31, 1996.

In April 1997, Capitol Broadcasting Company, LLC, reached an agreement to sell this station to Clear Channel Communications (now iHeartMedia) through Clear Channel Radio License, Inc. The deal was approved by the FCC on November 21, 1997, and the transaction was consummated on December 31, 1997.

=== The Breakfast Club ===
WKSJ's morning show was The Breakfast Club since the station hit airwaves. The longest running hosts of the morning program are Dan Brennan & Shelby Mitchell. Dan and Shelby premiered in 2000. The morning show also featured Uncle Henry, notable talk radio personality; and Colton Bradford, rising radio & television personality. Dan & Shelby were hugely successful with many nominations for CMA and ACM Radio Personalities of the Year. They welcomed the Bobby Bones Show to mornings in 2016 and moved the Dan & Shelby Show to Afternoons.
