= Estella Payton =

American television personality

- Born: August 17, 1904; Wilcox County, Alabama, U.S.
- Died: December 12, 1999 (aged 95); Mobile, Alabama, U.S.
- Other name: Estelle Payton
- Spouses: information withheld

Estella Payton, sometimes Estelle Payton (August 17, 1904 – December 16, 1999), was a co-star on the Woman's World cooking show that aired on WKRG-TV in Mobile, Alabama, for decades. Payton, an African American woman, appeared with Connie Bea Hope, a white woman, on the show starting in 1956. In the early years, Payton did not appear on camera unless her hands slipped into the shot while setting up or removing utensils. Later, in the 1960s, Payton began to appear on air and she eventually received third billing on the program's opening titles, was given her own microphone, and offered comments on Hope's demonstrations. The two women were known in the station for their usually good-natured backstage squabbles.

The Mobile Bay Convention and Visitor's Bureau website describes the pair as being "the Mobile version of Martha Stewart and Julia Child" and notes that when the long-running show appeared on Channel Five at a time when there were only two channels in the city. Payton lived to age 95.

Payton was the great-aunt of baseball legend Hank Aaron, who is also from Mobile.

== Additional sources ==
- Archival video of show (bottom of page)
