= Clara Stone Fields Collins =

American politician

Clara Stone Fields

Member of the Alabama Legislature
- In office 1963–1971

Personal details
- Born: February 5, 1908 Mobile, Alabama, US
- Died: June 2, 1981 (aged 73) Decatur, Alabama, US
- Party: Democratic

Clara Stone Fields Collins (February 5, 1908 – June 2, 1981) was a businesswoman and politician from Mobile, Alabama. The first woman to represent Mobile in the Alabama legislature and the first to qualify to run for Congress from Alabama, she was elected in 1962 and re-elected twice, becoming the only woman in the legislature during that decade, but failed to win re-nomination in the 1970 Democratic primary.

== Early and family life ==
Clara Stone was born on February 5, 1908, in Mobile, Alabama, to Claudia K. Stone and her husband George E. Stone, the long-time treasurer of Mobile County. Her grandmother lived with the family when she was a girl, though by the 1920 census, the household included two middle-age male boarders and a live-in African-American cook. She had two brothers, the elder of whom died as a child, though her younger brother George E. Stone Jr. would survive her. She graduated from the University of Alabama, receiving honors in chemistry. She married twice, first Edward Fields (1894–1956) and later Neal Collins, whom she also survived. Her sons Edward Fields and George Fields survived her, as did several grandchildren.

== Career ==
In the 1930 census, Stone still lived at home with her parents and brother and taught in the public schools. By 1940, she worked in her husband's insurance business.

In 1954, Fields was named "First Lady of Mobile", in 1963 she became Alabama Woman of the Year and in 1964 was named Outstanding Life Insurance Underwriter by her peers. She had served as President of Mobile's Junior League in 1945, succeeded by her sister-in-law. She also served as a trustee of the Alabama Institute for the Deaf and Blind in Talladega.

In 1962, Fields won election to the Alabama State Legislature, and by year's end had been selected one of three outstanding legislators. A Democrat, she unsuccessfully ran for Congress in 1964. She became the first woman to run for Congress in her state, although she lost the May Democratic primary to lawyer and veteran politician John M. Tyson Sr., who then lost the general election to Republican Jack Edwards. Republican presidential candidate Barry Goldwater swept Alabama in that year, although Democrat Lyndon B. Johnson won the national election in a landslide. Veteran Democrat Frank W. Boykin had served since 1930 and become known for his support of the Southern Manifesto, but Alabama lost one of its 9 seats as a result of the 1960 census redistricting, an held an unusual at-large election for all 8 congressional seats in November 1962 (the same election in which Fields was elected to the Alabama house). Boykin came in last and was eliminated, presumably also because had also been convicted of conspiracy and misuse of his public office, although he did not appeal as did his co-defendants including Congressman Thomas F. Johnson of Maryland.

Fields/Collins (after her remarriage) did win re-election to the Alabama House of Representatives after her Congressional defeat, and served as president of the National Order of Women Legislators and of Alabama Women Legislators. In 1970, Collins became one of three incumbent Mobile Democrats unseated in the primary.

== Death ==
Clara Stone Fields Collins died on June 2, 1981.
