= Gulf Coast Congressional Report =

- Created by: D.H. 'Buck' Long
- Starring: Jack Edwards (1973-85); Trent Lott (1973-89); Bob Sikes (1973-79); Earl Hutto (1979-89); Sonny Callahan (1985–2003); Jo Bonner (2003-06)
- Country of origin: United States

Production
- Running time: 30 minutes

Original release
- Network: WKRG-TV
- Release: 1973 – 2006

The Gulf Coast Congressional Report, or Congressional Report, is a public service television program broadcast by WKRG-TV in Mobile, Alabama from 1973 to 2006. Originally hosted by Representatives from the three congressional districts within the reach of WKRG's signal, the commercial-free talk show gave viewers a local perspective of Washington, D.C., and the central Gulf Coast from their congressman's standpoint. The program was free to broadcast and was paid for by tax dollars. It was recorded in one of the United States Capitol recording studios and in Mobile.

== History ==
D.H. "Buck" Long, vice president of WKRG, brought the idea of Congressional Report to the attention of Jack Edwards, who represented Alabama's 1st congressional district. The program would be a collaboration of Edwards, Trent Lott of Mississippi's 5th congressional district and Bob Sikes of Florida's 1st congressional district. Sikes was reluctant at first, according to Lott, but he ultimately joined the program from its first broadcast. Sikes was a Democrat; Edwards and Lott were Republicans. Throughout the years, the hosts made sure the program would remain non-partisan and free of conflicts.

After succeeding Sikes in 1979, fellow Democrat Earl Hutto joined the program. Edwards retired from Congress in 1985, and fellow Republican Sonny Callahan succeeded him in Congress and on the program. Shortly after Lott was elected to the U.S. Senate in 1988, Callahan took over as sole host. Lott and Hutto would reappear on the program during Callahan's term in Congress.

In 2002, Callahan announced his retirement from Congress and his chief of staff, Jo Bonner, became his successor. Like his former boss, Bonner also hosted Congressional Report on his own, and invited numerous guests. As an aide to Callahan, Bonner helped produce the program during the mid-1980s. In the July 2003 Nielsen ratings, the program in its 10:00 a.m. timeslot (following Face the Nation on CBS) still ranked higher in viewers than those of Mobile's three other major network TV affiliates. It continued to be profitable for WKRG, which had estimated that it could earn $1500 or more for airing the commercial-free program.

== Hiatus ==
On June 4, 2006, WKRG halted further airings of Congressional Report in response to an equal-time complaint by Jo Bonner's opponent in the 2006 election for Congress. Mobile lawyer Vivian Beckerle also accused the program of being a political promotion for Bonner's campaign. The station had planned on putting the program on hiatus August 6 due to federal rules requiring that such programs not air 90 days or less before an election, but the May 26 letter to WKRG made station officials put the program on hiatus two months earlier than expected.

The last pre-recorded program, which never aired, featured not a politician, but two emergency management officials from Mobile County and Baldwin County discussing hurricane preparedness. In exchange of the hiatus, Beckerle was offered two 30-minute segments of airtime. The segments aired respectively on June 11 and June 18 in Congressional Report's former timeslot. Bonner was re-elected in November, but never received word on when the Congressional Report would return to WKRG. In February 2007, Bonner's spokeswoman Nancy Wall acknowledged that her boss accepted that Congressional Report would not return to WKRG, but was actively exploring alternative methods of returning the program to the air. However, none of those efforts went anywhere before Bonner retired in 2013.
