= WRRD (FM) =

Coordinates: 33°32′53″N 83°04′15″W

- Greensboro, Georgia; United States
- Frequency: 89.9 MHz

Programming
- Network: Rejoice Broadcast Network

Ownership
- Owner: Pensacola Christian College, Inc.

History
- Former call signs: WEEZ (2011–2021)

Technical information
- Licensing authority: FCC
- Facility ID: 172936
- Class: A
- ERP: 630 watts
- HAAT: 95 meters (312 ft)
- Translator: See § Translators

Links
- Public license information: Public file; LMS

WRRD (89.9 FM) is a radio station licensed to Greensboro, Georgia. The station is part of the Rejoice Radio network owned by Pensacola Christian College.

Formerly easy listening WEEZ, original owner Community Public Radio sold WEEZ and its associated translator in Milledgeville to Pensacola Christian College effective April 23, 2021 for $142,500. The station changed its call sign to WRRD on April 26.
