= KRRB =

- Kuna, Idaho; United States
- Broadcast area: Boise, Idaho
- Frequency: 88.1 MHz
- Branding: Rejoice Radio

Programming
- Format: Christian radio
- Affiliations: Rejoice Broadcast Network

Ownership
- Owner: Pensacola Christian College, Inc.

History
- First air date: 2005 (as KARJ at 88.3)
- Former call signs: KARJ (2002–2017)
- Former frequencies: 88.3 MHz (2005–2016)

Technical information
- Licensing authority: FCC
- Facility ID: 88927
- Class: C1
- ERP: 45,000 watts
- HAAT: 298 meters (978 ft)
- Transmitter coordinates: 43°37′15″N 117°12′35″W

Links
- Public license information: Public file; LMS
- Webcast: Listen Live
- Website: rejoice.org

KRRB (88.1 FM) is a radio station licensed to Kuna, Idaho, United States. The station is an affiliate of Rejoice Broadcast Network, airing a Christian format, and is owned by Pensacola Christian College, Inc.

== History ==
The station was granted a construction permit on October 27, 1997, and assigned the call letters KARJ by the Federal Communications Commission on September 30, 2002. On January 20, 2017, Educational Media Foundation sold the station's license to Pensacola Christian College, Inc. for $275,000, at which point the station changed its call sign to the current KRRB.
