= Jack Edwards (American politician) =

American lawyer and politician (1928–2019)

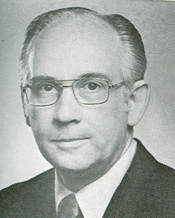

Member of the U.S. House of Representatives from Alabama's 1st district
- In office January 3, 1965 – January 3, 1985
- Preceded by: District reestablished (redistricting)
- Succeeded by: Sonny Callahan

Personal details
- Born: William Jackson Edwards; September 20, 1928 Birmingham, Alabama, U.S.
- Died: September 27, 2019 (aged 91) Fairhope, Alabama, U.S.
- Party: Republican
- Spouse: Jolane
- Relations: William F. Aldrich (great-great grandfather)
- Children: 2
- Occupation: Attorney, lawmaker

Military service
- Allegiance: United States
- Branch/service: United States Marine Corps
- Years of service: 1947-1951
- Battles/wars: Korean War

William Jackson "Jack" Edwards III (September 20, 1928 – September 27, 2019) was an American lawyer and politician from Alabama who served as a member of the United States House of Representatives representing Alabama's 1st congressional district from 1965 to 1985. A member of the Republican Party, Edwards first won election to Congress in 1964, one of five Republicans elected to the House from Alabama amid Republican presidential nominee Barry Goldwater's sweep of the state in that year's presidential election.

During Ronald Reagan's presidency, Edwards became the vice chairman of the Republican leadership and was a member of the United States House Appropriations Subcommittee on Defense. He oversaw the funding for the rebuilding efforts of Alabama's Dauphin Island Bridge in 1979.

== Early life and education ==
William Jackson Edwards III was born near Birmingham, Alabama in 1928. His father, William Jackson Edwards Jr., had grown up in Decatur, Alabama and worked for the Rural Electrification Administration at various jobs and receiving promotions until he headed the engineering department. Young Jack also knew and shared his formal name with his long-lived grandfather, William Jackson Edwards. He had a sister, Julia Caroline Edwards Brock, and grew up in Homewood, Alabama during the Great Depression. His great-grandfather was Perry Jackson Edwards (1847–1919) of Decatur, Alabama (nicknamed "Captain Jack"), who rose to become chief inspector of the Louisville and Nashville Railroad. Young Jack also knew his long-lived great uncle Perry Jackson Edwards. When young Jack was 17, he joined the U.S. Marine Corps and served until 1951 (as the Korean War began). His great-great-grandfather, William F. Aldrich, had been the last Republican congressman from the state, serving (with a few months' break) from 1896 to 1901.

He attended the University of Alabama and became the president of the Student Government Association, then attended the University of Alabama School of Law, graduating in 1954.

== Legal career ==
After becoming a member of the Alabama Bar, Edwards eventually moved to Point Clear, a suburb of Mobile and opened a law practice there. He became president of the Mobile Area Jaycees and in 1961 was named one of the Outstanding Young Men in America by the national Jaycees organization. Edwards also served as president of the Alabama Deep Sea Fishing Rodeo as well as chairman of America's Junior Miss Pageant. Beginning in 1960, he advised Mobile's Planning Commission's Transportation Policy Committee.

== Congressional career ==
In November 1964, Edwards defeated Democrat John M. Tyson Sr. and Mobile activist Noble Beasley to become the U.S. Congressman representing Alabama's 1st congressional district. Alabama had lost one of its nine seats after the 1960 federal census, and after a statewide vote, the first district's Democratic incumbent, Frank W. Boykin, a 28-year congressional veteran recently again implicated in a corruption scandal, had been the lowest vote-getter and thus redistricted out of his office. Since Alabama could not actually lose its first district, Tyson (a lawyer like Edwards and who served in both houses of the Alabama legislature) had become his party's candidate after the Democratic primary in which he defeated Clara Stone Fields, the only woman in the Alabama legislature during that decade.

Edwards became one of five Republicans elected to the House from Alabama (the others being James D. Martin, John H. Buchanan Jr., Glenn Andrews, and William L. Dickinson) amid Republican presidential nominee Barry Goldwater's sweep of the state in that year's presidential election. Edwards defeated Democrat John Tyson Sr. by 19 points. He went on to be reelected nine times and served alongside five American presidents. The Mobile area's voters, like most of their counterparts in Alabama, turned against the Democrats after Lyndon Johnson signed the Civil Rights Act of 1964. Parts of the district had been among the first parts of Alabama where old-line Democrats began splitting their tickets as early as the 1940s. Edwards also picked up long coattails from Goldwater, who carried the district by well over 70 percent of the vote.

Although most of the 1st's living residents had never been represented by a Republican before, Edwards became very popular in his district, to the point that he would never face a close contest for reelection. He only dropped below 59 percent of the vote once, in 1968. Despite this, Democrats would hold most of the area's seats in the state legislature well into the 1990s.

During his time in Congress, Edwards worked for development of the Tennessee–Tombigbee Waterway and served on the House Appropriations Committee as well as became the ranking Republican on the Defense subcommittee. Reportedly President Ronald Reagan's point man to improve national defense, Edwards also led efforts to establish both the Bon Secour National Wildlife Refuge and the Weeks Bay National Estuarine Research Reserve. During Reagan's presidency, he became the vice chairman of the House Republican conference leadership. He was the ranking Republican member on the Appropriations Subcommittee on Defense. After serving on the committee for ten years, he had become a national defense expert. He was also a member of the House Banking Committee.

From 1973 to 1985, he was co-host of the Gulf Coast Congressional Report, which aired on WKRG-TV in Mobile.

According to the Alabama governor's office, Edwards was a strong supporter of Reagan's military buildup. In 1979, after a devastating hurricane, Alabama's Dauphin Island bridge had to be rebuilt, and Edwards oversaw the funding.

== Later years ==
Edwards announced he would not run again in 1984, and Vice-president George H. W. Bush spoke at his retirement dinner. Edwards then joined the Hand Arendall law firm, where he practiced law for another two decades. in 1988, he chaired the Base Realignment and Closure Commission.

Edwards continued his civic involvement in Mobile, becoming as chairman of the board of the Mobile Area Chamber of Commerce, as well as serving on various boards of trustees, including of the University of Alabama System, his alma mater (from 1988 til 1999), and became its president after his retirement from the law firm. He was a member on the boards of the Mobile Opera, Mobile Economic Development Council and the Mayor's Waterfront Advisory Committee, among others. From 1987 to 1996, he served on the board of the Metropolitan Washington Airports Authority. In 1988, he served as co-chairman of the Secretary of Defense's first commission, known as the 1988 Base Realignment and Closure Commission (BRAC I). In his final years Edwards, worked in the areas of constitutional reform, education, the environment and economic development in the Mobile area. He also served on the corporate boards of several companies such as The Southern Company, Holcim Inc., Northrop Grumman Corporation, QMS Inc., Dravo Corporation and The Aerospace Corporation. According to Alabama governor Kay Ivey, Edwards was respected by both Democrats and Republicans.

== Awards ==
In 1987, Edwards was named Alabama's Volunteer Industrial Developer of the Year. In 1985, he was inducted into the Alabama Academy of Honor. In 1987, he was named Mobilian of the Year. In 2005, he was inducted into the Hall of Fame of the University of Alabama's College of Communications and Information Sciences.

== Death ==
Edwards died of pancreatic cancer at his home in Fairhope, Alabama, on September 27, 2019, one week after his 91st birthday. Alabama governor Kay Ivey said Edwards "served his state and nation with the highest degree of integrity" and said flags at the Alabama State Capitol would be flown at half-staff in his honor.

A statement released by Edwards' family quoted him as having said "My hope is that my great grandchildren will grow up in a country where civility will have been returned to common discourse and to the efforts to solve the country’s problems."

U.S. House of Representatives
Preceded by Frank W. Boykin	Member of the U.S. House of Representatives from Alabama's 1st congressional district 1965–1985	Succeeded by Sonny Callahan
