= WRGV =

Radio station in Pensacola, Florida

Coordinates: 30.611306°N 87.607472°W

- Pensacola, Florida; United States
- Broadcast area: Pensacola, Florida; Mobile, Alabama
- Frequency: 107.3 MHz (HD Radio)
- Branding: 107.3 The Beat

Programming
- Format: Mainstream urban
- Affiliations: Premiere Networks

Ownership
- Owner: iHeartMedia, Inc.; (iHM Licenses, LLC)
- Sister stations: WKSJ-FM, WMXC, WNTM, WRKH, WTKX-FM

History
- First air date: 1976; 50 years ago
- Former call signs: WAJB (1976–1980); WOWW (1980–1996); WYCL (1996–2010)
- Call sign meaning: former Groove branding

Technical information
- Licensing authority: FCC
- Facility ID: 63931
- Class: C0
- ERP: 50,000 watts
- HAAT: 488 meters (1,601 ft)

Links
- Public license information: Public file; LMS
- Webcast: Listen live (via iHeartRadio)
- Website: thebeatgulfcoast.iheart.com

WRGV (107.3 FM) is a radio station licensed to serve the community of Pensacola, Florida, United States. The station is currently owned by San Antonio-based iHeartMedia and the broadcast license is held by iHM Licenses, LLC. WRGV broadcasts a mainstream urban music format to the greater Pensacola, Florida, and Mobile, Alabama, area. Its studios are located inside the building of unrelated television station WKRG-TV on Broadcast Drive in Mobile, and the transmitter is near Robertsdale, Alabama.

== History ==
In 1976, 107.3 FM belonged to WAJB, which was a beautiful music station with studios at the Tiger Point Country Club in Gulf Breeze, until it was purchased by Colonial Broadcasting in 1979. The format was changed to country music along with new call letters, WOWW to become known as "WOW 107", moving its studios to Davis Highway in Pensacola.

As the 1980s progressed, "WOW 107" would rise up to become a country music power house, overthrowing the heritage country station in the market, WXBM-FM, and winning several Billboard Magazine's Station of the Year (small market) awards. It was also known for its full-time News department, winner of multiple AP news awards.

As the 1980s ended, so did WOW 107's run of being a ratings king, now owned by Sun Media Group. The 1990s saw several re-imaging attempts, including "The New WOW 107.3" and "107 Thunder Country", until its demise as a country station in 1995 when it became "New Rock One Zero Seven", flipping to alternative rock. Riding the popularity wave of mid-1990s alternative music, WOWW debuted at #1 in Arbitron's Persons 18-34, where it remained until the purchase and format flip by Paxson. "New Rock 107" staff included Steve Williams as Operations Manager/Morning Show host, Program Director/Midday host Joel Sampson, Music Director/Afternoon host LaLaine, and evening host Suzy Boe, among others.

In 1996, the station was purchased by Southern Broadcasting, which owned New Rock 107's only competition, WTKX, "TK101". Two months later, both were purchased by Paxson Communications. After the Paxson purchase, TK101, being a heritage rock station since the mid-1970s, brought over WOWW's PD Joel Sampson, retained Midday personality Mark "the Shark" Dyba and added a majority of WOWW air staff and re-imaged itself as "The Rock Station", dropping the moniker "The New Rock Alternative", leaving WOWW without an airstaff or a format.

After stunting for two days playing "Macarena" by Los del Rio non-stop, WOWW changed formats to oldies from the 1950s and 1960s, and changed its call letters to WYCL (which stood for "Way Cool"). As time went on, they phased out the 1950s music to include more 1970s songs.

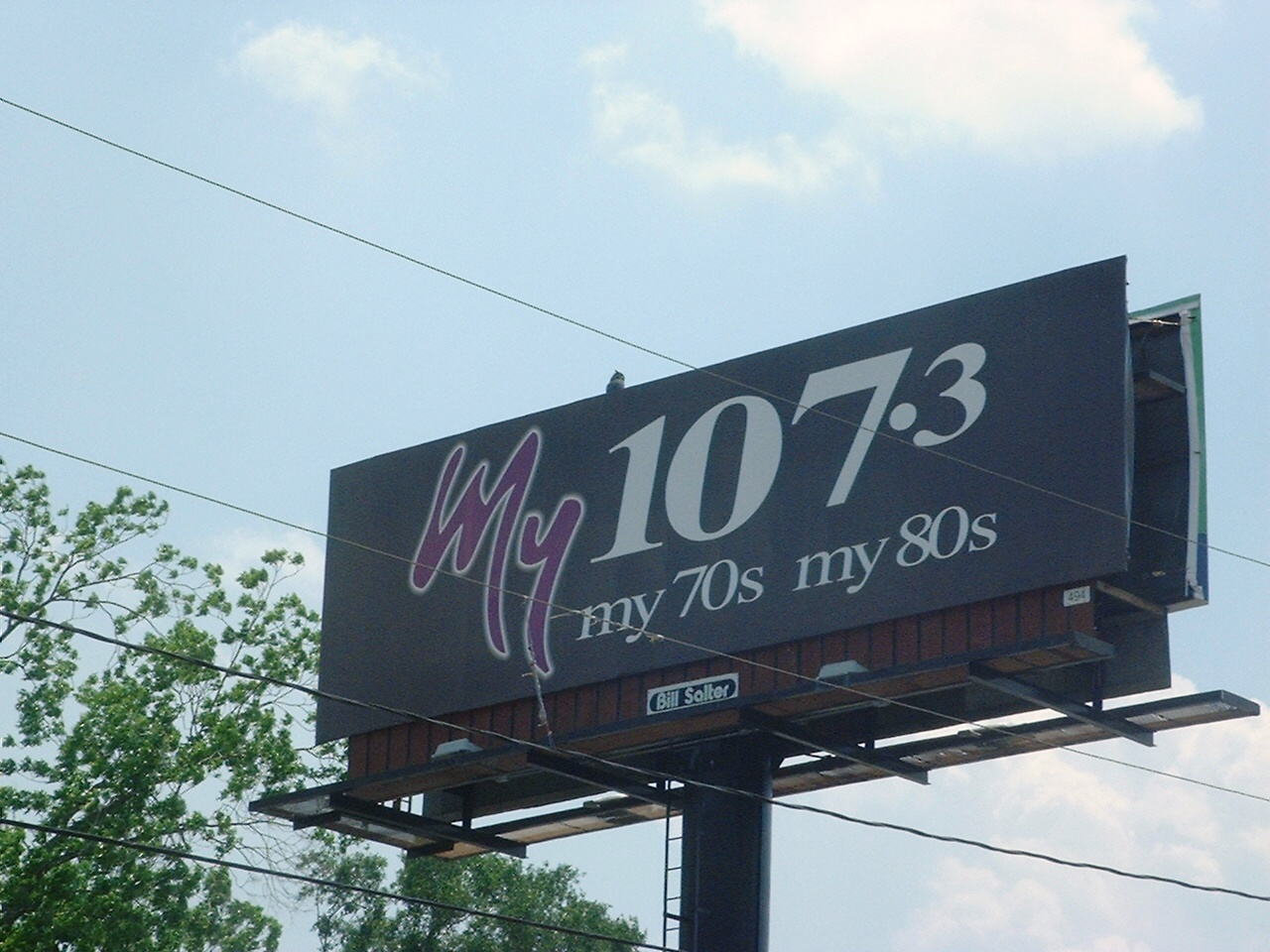
A billboard in downtown Pensacola advertising the change in format.

Then, in late 2004, the station's owner, now iHeartMedia, Inc. (formerly Clear Channel Communications), switched the format to "My 107.3", and played 1970s and 1980s music. However, the "My 70s, My 80s" positioner was discontinued and the station used "My Variety" as its main positioner, in order to include a slightly wider variety of music. The playlist remained mostly 1970s and early 1980s, with a fair amount of 1960s and other 1980s songs, making it a classic hits format.

For three years after the September 11, 2001 attacks, the station played breaking news bulletins every hour on top of the hour (first provided by ABC News, then by Clear Channel Worldwide News), as well as "The Star-Spangled Banner" at the start and close of each workday.

In February 2010, the station ceased the "My 107.3" format and began simulcasting sister station WMXC. On February 26, 2010, at 8:00 a.m., WYCL flipped to rhythmic adult contemporary format, branded as "107.3 The Groove". The first song on The Groove was "Into the Groove" by Madonna. On March 5, 2010, WYCL changed their call letters to WRGV to go with "The Groove" branding. After a year as a Rhythmic AC, WRGV evolved to Rhythmic Top 40 in April 2011. On September 2, 2011, WRGV changed their format to Top 40 (CHR), branded as "107.3 Hit Music Now". It featured the syndicated Elvis Duran Morning Show and former WABB staffers Reid and Matt McCoy. On July 20, 2015, WRGV rebranded as "107.3 Kiss FM".

On December 8, 2017, at 5 p.m., after playing "1-800-273-8255" by Logic featuring Alessia Cara and Khalid, WRGV adopted W262BL/WMXC-HD2's urban contemporary format as "107.3 The Beat". The first song on "The Beat" was "Love" by Kendrick Lamar featuring Zacari.
