= WPCS (FM) =

Rejoice Radio station in Pensacola, Florida

Rejoice Broadcast Network Flagship Station
- Pensacola, Florida; United States
- Broadcast area: Pensacola, Florida; Mobile, Alabama
- Frequency: 89.5 MHz
- Branding: Rejoice Radio

Programming
- Format: Christian Radio
- Affiliations: Rejoice Broadcast Network

Ownership
- Owner: Pensacola Christian College, Inc.
- Sister stations: KPCS

History
- First air date: June 21, 1971
- Call sign meaning: W Pensacola Christian School

Technical information
- Licensing authority: FCC
- Facility ID: 52230
- Class: C0
- ERP: 95,000 watts
- HAAT: 414 meters
- Transmitter coordinates: 30°35′16″N 87°33′13″W
- Translator: See § Translators

Links
- Public license information: Public file; LMS
- Webcast: Listen Live
- Website: rejoice.org

WPCS (89.5 MHz, "Rejoice Radio") is an FM radio station broadcasting a Christian radio format. Licensed to Pensacola, Florida, United States, the station is currently owned by, and is a ministry of, Pensacola Christian College.

WPCS is the flagship station of the Rejoice Broadcast Network, a network of 41 stations that receive, via satellite uplink, the programming of WPCS. The programming of the Rejoice Broadcast Network includes Christian talk and teaching and Christian music.

Previous logo

== Translators ==
Broadcast translators of WPCS
Call sign	Frequency (MHz)	City of license	State	Facility ID
K219DH	91.7	Grand Junction	Colorado	86638
W203BT	88.5	Vero Beach	Florida	81575
W215BA	90.9	Rome	Georgia	85816
K207DL	89.3	Twin Falls	Idaho	121885
W212CO	90.3	Kankakee	Illinois	79410
W220BL	91.9	Rockford	Illinois	78668
W209AW	89.7	Fort Wayne	Indiana	79392
W224AX	92.7	Lafayette	Indiana	86448
W217AS	91.3	Terre Haute	Indiana	86934
W208BY	89.5	Wabash	Indiana	85820
W217BZ	91.3	Warsaw	Indiana	89540
W216BB	91.1	Williamsport	Indiana	78884
K220HO	91.9	Sioux City	Iowa	93065
K215FP	90.9	Manhattan	Kansas	88627
W210CC	89.9	Salisbury	Maryland	78890
W212CL	90.3	Benton Harbor	Michigan	78882
W219CA	91.7	Kalamazoo	Michigan	86418
W214CA	90.7	Muskegon	Michigan	84429
W216BA	91.1	Hattiesburg	Mississippi	84370
W204BT	88.7	Meridian	Mississippi	121802
K212FO	90.3	Great Falls	Montana	85870
K213DF	90.5	Kalispell	Montana	86636
K208GD	89.5	Grand Island	Nebraska	89518
K220GF	91.9	Las Cruces	New Mexico	78657
W205BR	88.9	Elmira	New York	88492
W206CI	89.1	West Schuyler	New York	87055
K210BY	89.9	Klamath Falls	Oregon	85688
K209CP	89.7	Talent	Oregon	88015
K215FR	90.9	Toledo	Oregon	76814
W214CF	90.7	Mansfield	Pennsylvania	89607
W206BE	89.1	Johnson City	Tennessee	121234
K206EV	89.1	Huntsville	Texas	121879
K218DI	91.5	Woodrow	Texas	122140
W208BR	89.5	Wheeling	West Virginia	90545
W212BB	90.3	Wausau	Wisconsin	88618
K209CS	89.7	Casper	Wyoming	88618
