= CCNE =

CCNE may refer to:

- Cisco Career Certifications
- Commission on Collegiate Nursing Education
- Cyclin E
