= WTKX-FM =

Radio station in Pensacola, Florida

- Pensacola, Florida; United States
- Broadcast area: Pensacola, Florida; Mobile, Alabama
- Frequency: 101.5 MHz (HD Radio)
- Branding: TK101

Programming
- Format: Active rock
- Affiliations: Compass Media Networks; United Stations Radio Networks

Ownership
- Owner: iHeartMedia, Inc.; (iHM Licenses, LLC)
- Sister stations: WKSJ-FM, WMXC, WNTM, WRGV, WRKH

History
- First air date: 1971 (as WBOP-FM)
- Former call signs: WONF (CP, 1967-1971); WBOP-FM (1971–1978); WTKX (1978–1989)

Technical information
- Licensing authority: FCC
- Facility ID: 61243
- Class: C
- ERP: 100,000 watts
- HAAT: 488 meters (1,601 ft)
- Transmitter coordinates: 30°36′40.7″N 87°36′26.3″W

Links
- Public license information: Public file; LMS
- Webcast: Listen Live
- Website: tk101.iheart.com

WTKX-FM (101.5 MHz) is an active rock music formatted radio station licensed to serve Pensacola, Florida. The broadcast area reaches far into northwest Florida, nearly all of southwest Alabama and as far as Kiln, Mississippi.

== History and content ==
In November 2014 the station studio and broadcast center was moved to Mobile, Alabama to be consolidated with other iHeartMedia facilities. In early 2020, WTKX opened a downtown Pensacola office and studios.

WTKX features syndicated personalities "Lex & Terry" on the morning drive.

The station broadcasts in HD Radio and formerly carried "Hit Nation Junior" on its HD2 sub-channel.

WTKX has been a rock radio station for over 43 years as it was first established as TK-101 in 1978. The station was sold to ClearChannel in 1996, ending its run as an independent station programmed in-house.

Local on-air personalities and alumni include: APD/MD "Mark The Shark" Dyba (deceased 2019), PD/OM Joel Sampson, Candy Cullerton (now AM Drive at WYCT-FM Pensacola), Steve Smith, PD/MD Strummer, Linda J, Greg Golden (Linda J/Greg Golden = Nuts & Honey), PD Ken Clark, Dave Collins, Tommy Robinetti (Dave Collins/Tommy Robinetti = Tommy & Collins), Bedpan Andy, Rick Allen, Scott Free, Nick At Nite, Rory Suchet, Mike Ondako, Scotty, Suzy Boe, Alex, Lalaine, Linda Lawrence, Elvis Jones, Nick Flynn, Dick Danger, Gus Brandt, plus Jon Stewart, Jeffrey Stevens, and Chip Nelson a.k.a. The Breakfast Flakes. 1985 saw Mark Dagwell assume the PD reins with J.D.Stone doing afternoon drive and handling the MD duties. The local newspaper, The Pensacola News Journal, held a contest to see who was the most popular DJ in the area and Stone won the competition.

Current Program Director and PM Drive host is Brian "Crash" Edwards (2018–present)
