= WNTM =

- Mobile, Alabama; United States
- Broadcast area: Mobile metropolitan area
- Frequency: 710 kHz
- Branding: NewsRadio 710 WNTM

Programming
- Format: Talk radio
- Affiliations: Fox News Radio; Premiere Networks; WKRG-TV

Ownership
- Owner: iHeartMedia, Inc.; (iHM Licenses, LLC)
- Sister stations: WKSJ-FM, WMXC, WRGV, WRKH, WTKX-FM

History
- First air date: September 26, 1946
- Former call signs: WKRG (1946–1994); WNTM (1994–2004); WPMI (2004–2007)
- Call sign meaning: News Talk of Mobile

Technical information
- Licensing authority: FCC
- Facility ID: 8695
- Class: B
- Power: 1,000 watts
- Transmitter coordinates: 30°43′13″N 88°3′34″W
- Repeater: 99.9 WMXC-HD3 (Mobile)

Links
- Public license information: Public file; LMS
- Webcast: Listen Live
- Website: newsradio710.iheart.com

WNTM (710 AM) is a commercial radio station licensed to Mobile, Alabama, United States. The station features a talk format branded as "News Radio 710." WNTM is owned by iHeartMedia and the broadcast license is held by iHM Licenses, LLC. Its studios are located in the same building as Channel 5 WKRG-TV on Broadcast Drive in Mobile, and the transmitter is just north of downtown. (Both stations had been co-owned at one time.) WKRG-TV supplies local news and weather, while Fox News Radio supplies national newscasts.

== History ==
The station was originally owned by movie theater owner, architect, and broadcasting pioneer Kenneth R. Giddens, whose family-owned WKRG-TV Inc. put WKRG (710 AM) on the air on September 26, 1946. It became a CBS affiliate on December 15, 1947. At that time it operated with 1 KW power during the day and 250 W at night.

The station would have an FM companion broadcasting on 99.9 MHz starting on October 16, 1947 (today's WMXC), followed by television partner WKRG-TV on September 5, 1955. Like competitor WABB-FM, WKRG-FM was a simulcast of the AM station before finding its own format of beautiful music in 1965. In March 1970, the Federal Communications Commission (FCC) enforced new rules preventing future radio and television ownership combinations in the same market, which allowed the stations of WKRG-TV, Inc. to remain standing, or "grandfathered".

For much of its history, the former CBS-affiliated WKRG had a format of middle of the road music and talk shows. Such talk shows included an afternoon program hosted by future WKRG-TV sports director Randy Patrick, but the talk radio format would soon dominate the schedule later in the 1980s as FM reigned with its superior sound. The next change for WKRG Radio in the 1980s was a new location, as WKRG-TV, Inc. moved from its long-time home on downtown Mobile's St. Louis Street to its current facility close to the city's two malls, Springdale Mall and Bel Air Mall. WKRG Radio, including both 710 AM and 99.9 FM were sold off in late 1994. A new journey awaits these two legendary stations.

On October 12, 1994, WKRG became known as WNTM, with call letters standing for "News Talk of Mobile", making it clear that the new owners at Capital Broadcasting want to keep the talk radio format. Along with radio programs such as The Rush Limbaugh Show, some former WKRG Radio staff would stay in this midst of change. The station's owners would also inherit studio & office space on the third floor of WKRG-TV's facility. Clear Channel Communications would take ownership of 710 AM and 99.9 FM in 1997. Interesting enough, Clear Channel also owns what would become WKRG-TV's biggest rival in decades, the new NBC affiliate WPMI. After WPMI started its news operation in January 1996, the resources of this new addition to the Mobile-Pensacola news media would be put to good use for WNTM in the years to come.

=== Expanded Band assignment ===
On March 17, 1997, the FCC announced that eighty-eight stations had been given permission to move to newly available "Expanded Band" transmitting frequencies, ranging from 1610 to 1700 kHz, with WNTM authorized to move from 710 to 1660 kHz. However, the station never procured the Construction Permit needed to implement the authorization, so the expanded band station was never built.

=== Later history ===
Logo as "Fox NewsRadio 710 WNTM"

On August 12, 2004, WNTM received another change in call letters, this time to WPMI, due to the station's close relationship with WPMI-TV. The station has also seen an expansion of local news from WPMI-TV, along with the timeslots of regularly scheduled programs. The new partnership also meant the end of affiliation with ABC News Radio, meaning no more of Paul Harvey's daily and weekend broadcasts for listeners on the central Gulf Coast. In the three-year period as WPMI, the station changed its radio network affiliation twice. After almost a year with NBC News Radio, WPMI radio became affiliated with Fox News. Ironically, WPMI-TV was affiliated with the Fox television network before joining NBC in 1996. On June 28, 2007, the call sign reverted to WNTM. On August 1, 2007, the station entered into a strategic partnership with WKRG-TV, similar to its previous relationship with WPMI-TV, gaining access to its former sister station's news and weather resources. However, the radio/tv news partnership has now been re-established with WPMI NBC 15.

== Programming ==
WNTM has a local wake-up show hosted by "Uncle Henry", followed by nationally syndicated shows from Premiere Networks.

== Notable personalities ==
Numerous radio personalities have been heard over Mobile's 710 AM, including a few voices from the WKRG Radio years still around today. Until November 2007, former WKRG-FM disc jockey Scott O'Brien hosted "Mobile's First News" and "Ask the Expert" in the morning. Michael P. Sloan was a newsbreak reader and Daniel Shane McBryde hosted his own afternoon program during the first WNTM era; both are WABB veterans. Alex Mathis later joined McBryde as producer and fill-in host. Long time radio personality Yvonne Morrison hosted "The Garden Show" alongside reporter Charlie Moss on Saturday mornings.

Overnight, the station broadcasts the syndicated Coast to Coast AM hosted by George Noory. The station also broadcasts the syndicated Saturday night program Somewhere In Time hosted by Art Bell.
