= Rejoice Broadcast Network =

Christian radio network in the United States

Rejoice Radio
- Type: Radio network
- Branding: Rejoice Radio
- Country: United States
- Owner: Pensacola Christian College, Inc.
- Launch date: December 1996
- Webcast: Streaming
- Official website: rejoice.org

Rejoice Radio is a network of Christian radio stations airing a format of Christian talk and teaching and Christian music. The network is owned by Pensacola Christian College.

== History ==
Since 1971, Rejoice Radio has broadcast Christian music and programs to encourage listeners and witness in the community. In the early 1970s, Dr. Arlin Horton was inspired to start a Christian radio station for listeners along the upper Gulf Coast. On June 21, 1971, WPCS began operation. In December 1996, WPCS expanded its outreach by broadcasting the Rejoice Broadcasting Network on its first translator station in Eugene, Oregon. Now through the financial support of its listeners, Rejoice Radio is broadcast on over 40 stations and the Internet, reaching listeners across America and around the world. Rejoice Radio continues the vision of broadcasting Christian music and programming to encourage believers and provide a gospel witness in the community.

Previous logo

== Timeline ==
On June 21, 1971, WPCS signed on the air as an educational, noncommercial, nonprofit, Christian radio ministry for the northwest Florida area. From its frequency 89.3 FM, WPCS broadcast Christian programming 17 hours a day.

In 1985 WPCS began broadcasting 24 hours a day. In 1987 WPCS moved to a new tower, and the frequency changed to 89.5 FM. In 1988 WPCS moved to its current location in the Visual and Performing Arts building of Pensacola Christian College. In December 1996, the Rejoice Broadcast Network began with its first station in Eugene, Oregon.

1997

- RBN became available on the Internet, extending its ministry to listeners around the globe.
- In March, the translator of Toledo, Oregon 88.7 FM began broadcasting.
- In June, the translator of Vero Beach, Florida 88.5 FM began broadcasting.
- In October, the translator of Klamath Falls, Oregon 89.9 FM began broadcasting.
- In December, the translator of Kalamazoo, Michigan 91.7 FM began broadcasting and Muskegon, Michigan 90.7 FM began broadcasting.

1998

- In January, the translator of Rockford, Illinois 91.9 FM began broadcasting, Las Cruces, New Mexico 91.9 FM began broadcasting, and Talent, Oregon 89.7 FM began broadcasting.
- In April, the translator of Grand Junction, Colorado 91.7 FM began broadcasting and Hattiesburg, Mississippi 91.1 FM began broadcasting.
- In May, the translator of Kankakee, Illinois 89.3 FM began broadcasting.
- In July, the translator of Terre Haute, Indiana 91.3 FM began broadcasting.
- In August, the translator of Salisbury, Maryland 89.9 FM began broadcasting.
- In September, the translator of Manhattan, Kansas 90.7 FM began broadcasting.
- In October, the translator of Fort Wayne, Indiana 89.7 FM began broadcasting, Wabash, Indiana 88.5 FM began broadcasting, Benton Harbor, Michigan 90.3 FM began broadcasting, and Wausau, Wisconsin 90.3 FM began broadcasting.
- In November, the translator of Warsaw, Indiana 91.3 FM began broadcasting, Mansfield, Pennsylvania 89.1 FM began broadcasting, and Casper, Wyoming 89.7 FM began broadcasting.
- In December, the translator of Great Falls, Montana 90.3 FM began broadcasting and Kalispell, Montana 90.5 FM began broadcasting.

1999

- In April, the translator of Grand Island, Nebraska 89.7 FM began broadcasting.
- In June, the translator of Wheeling, West Virginia 89.7 FM began broadcasting.
- In August, the translator of West Schuyler, New York 88.5 FM began broadcasting. In October, the translator of Lafayette, Indiana 92.7 FM began broadcasting.

2000

- In March, the translator of Rome, Georgia 90.9 FM began broadcasting.

2002

- In January, the translator of Johnson City, Tennessee 89.1 FM began broadcasting.
- In April, the translator of Elmira, New York 88.9 FM began broadcasting.
- In June, the translator of Sioux City, Iowa 91.9 FM began broadcasting. In November, the translator of Williamsport, Indiana 91.1 FM began broadcasting.

2003

- In March, the translator of Meridian, Mississippi 89.7 FM began broadcasting.
- In July, the translator of Twin Falls, Idaho 89.3 FM began broadcasting.
- In October, the translator of Woodrow, Texas 91.5 FM began broadcasting.

In January 2004, the translator of Huntsville, Texas 91.1 FM began broadcasting.

On April 23, 2010, the full-power station KPCS 89.7 FM began broadcasting in the Minneapolis/St. Paul, Minnesota area.

In 2015 Rejoice Radio became available on mobile devices.

On February 10, 2017, the full-power station KRRB 88.1 FM began broadcasting in the Boise, Idaho area.

In October 2018, the low-power station WJQY-LP 101.1 FM began broadcasting in the Wilson, North Carolina area.

== Online streams ==
Rejoice Radio is home to multiple online streaming options.

Title	Description	
Still Waters	Refreshing instrumental melodies	https://www.rejoice.org/streams/?stream=instrumental
Seasons	Music that changes with the seasons	https://www.rejoice.org/streams/?stream=seasons
Sonshine Kids	Fun, faith-based children's programming and music	https://www.rejoice.org/sonshine.aspx
Timeless Praise	Classic hymns and songs of the faith	https://www.rejoice.org/streams/?stream=praise
Rejoice Pulpit	Classic preaching from the eternal Word	https://www.rejoice.org/streams/pulpit-schedule.aspx
Old Country Church	Down-home gospel music	https://www.rejoice.org/streams/?stream=gospel

== Streaming methods ==
Rejoice Radio is available to listen to via online stream anywhere in the world.

== Stations ==
Rejoice Radio is heard on 41 stations and 2 affiliates. The network's flagship station is WPCS in Pensacola, Florida.

Call sign	Frequency	City of license	State	Facility ID	Class	Power (W)	ERP (W)	Height (m (ft))
WPCS (Note: Flagship station; for WPCS translators, see WPCS (FM) § Translators)	89.5 FM	Pensacola	Florida	52230	C0	—	95,000	414 m (1,358 ft)
WRRD	89.9 FM	Greensboro	Georgia	172936	A	—	630	95 m (312 ft)
KRRB	88.1 FM	Kuna	Idaho	88927	C1	—	45,000	298 m (978 ft)
WRRI	91.9 FM	Monticello	Indiana	767053	A	—	220	85 m (279 ft)
KPCS	89.7 FM	Princeton	Minnesota	93446	C3	—	15,500	42.4 m (139 ft)
WJQY-LP	101.1 FM	Wilson	North Carolina	191639	LP1	—	10	17.8 m (58 ft)
