= WMXC =

- Mobile, Alabama; United States
- Broadcast area: Mobile - Pensacola - Gulf Coast
- Frequency: 99.9 MHz (HD Radio)
- Branding: Mix 99.9

Programming
- Format: Adult contemporary
- Subchannels: HD2: Urban gospel "Hallelujah 100.3"; HD3: News/talk (WNTM simulcast)
- Affiliations: Premiere Networks

Ownership
- Owner: iHeartMedia, Inc.; (iHM Licenses, LLC)
- Sister stations: WKSJ-FM; WNTM; WRGV; WRKH; WTKX-FM

History
- First air date: September 16, 1947; 79 years ago (as WKRG-FM)
- Former call signs: WKRG-FM (1947–1994); WKRD (1994)
- Call sign meaning: "Mix"

Technical information
- Licensing authority: FCC
- Facility ID: 8696
- Class: C
- ERP: 94,000 watts; 100,000 watts (w/beam tilt)
- HAAT: 535 meters (1,755 ft)
- Transmitter coordinates: 30°41′20.7″N 87°49′49″W
- Translator: HD2: 100.3 W262BL (Mobile)

Links
- Public license information: Public file; LMS
- Webcast: Listen live (via iHeartRadio); HD2: Listen live (via iHeartRadio); HD3: Listen live (via iHeartRadio)
- Website: mixgulfcoast.iheart.com; HD2: 1003hallelujahfm.iheart.com; HD3: newsradio710.iheart.com

WMXC (99.9 FM) is a commercial radio station licensed to Mobile, Alabama, and serving the Mobile and Pensacola metropolitan areas. The station broadcasts an adult contemporary radio format, switching to Christmas music for much of November and December. It is owned by iHeartMedia, with the broadcast license held by iHM Licenses, LLC. The studios are co-located with former sister television station WKRG-TV on Broadcast Drive in Mobile. WMXC carries several syndicated shows from co-owned Premiere Networks: Murphy, Sam & Jodi in morning drive time, Delilah in the evening and Ellen K on Saturday mornings.

WMXC's transmitter is in Robertsdale, Alabama. It broadcasts using HD Radio technology. The HD2 digital subchannel airs an urban gospel format which feeds 250-watt FM translator W262BL at 100.3 MHz. The HD3 subchannel simulcasts the talk radio format of WNTM 710 AM.

== History ==
=== WKRG-FM ===
The station traces its history back to October 16, 1947, when it signed on as WKRG-FM. The original call letters represented the initials of Kenneth R. Giddens, a movie theatre owner, broadcast pioneer, and architect. Giddens also owned WKRG 710 AM (now WNTM). In 1955, he also put WKRG-TV on the air, the latter of which continues to broadcast with the same call letters. Giddens would go on to head the Voice of America from 1969 to 1977 and served as acting director of Radio Marti in 1985. Giddens, a former board member of the National Association of Broadcasters, died in May 1993.

In its early days, WKRG-FM simulcast its AM counterpart. But in 1965, it adopted a beautiful music format, featuring quarter-hour sweeps of soft instrumental music with limited talk and commercials. During the 1970s, WKRG-FM became the area's first Top-40 station on the FM dial and was known as "G-100". WKRG-FM operated as a Top-40/CHR station until 1986 when it flipped to adult contemporary under the name "WKRG 99.9 FM". By the early 1990's the format remained under the name "Coast100".

For a time in the 1960s, WKRG-TV, Inc., which was the license holder for WKRG, WKRG-FM, and WKRG-TV, was 50%-owned by the Mobile Press-Register daily newspaper. In 1966, when S. I. Newhouse acquired the Mobile newspaper company, he also acquired that 50% broadcasting ownership stake. Newhouse, who also owned radio stations associated with his other two Alabama-based newspapers, later sold all of these stations to focus on the print side of his media empire.

=== Change in ownership ===
After nearly five decades of operation by the Giddens family, WKRG-TV, Inc., reached an agreement in April 1994 to sell WKRG-FM to Coast Radio, LLC. The deal was approved by the FCC on July 21, 1994.

In September 1994, Coast Radio, LLC, flipped the station to Capitol Broadcasting Company, LLC. The deal was approved by the FCC on December 15, 1994, and the transaction was consummated the same day.

=== WMXC ===
The station was assigned the call letters WKRD by the Federal Communications Commission on September 12, 1994. This change would prove short-lived as the station was assigned the current WMXC call sign on October 3, 1994.

In April 1997, Capitol Broadcasting Company, LLC, made a deal to sell this station to Clear Channel Communications through the Clear Channel Radio License, Inc, subsidiary. The deal, part of the $24 million complete acquisition of Capital Broadcasting, was approved by the FCC on November 21, 1997, and the transaction was consummated on December 31, 1997.

Hurricane Ivan struck the Gulf Coast in 2004, and Hurricane Katrina followed in 2005. On both occasions, the station dropped all regular programming, and along with WKSJ, broadcast local hurricane and recovery information. It was the market's only radio-specific storm coverage. During Katrina, WMXC's continuous local coverage ran for 122 consecutive hours.

In 2006, WMXC began streaming on the Internet but with a different commercial schedule than its over-the-air signal. During 2007, the station started broadcasting in HD. A secondary HD-2 channel is also operating with a full-time Smooth Jazz format, a complement to the primary station's Smooth Jazz Sunday Brunch.

=== HD Radio ===
When it first began broadcasting using HD Radio technology, WMXC aired an urban contemporary format on its HD2 subchannel. It was branded as "100.3 The Beat" (simulcast on FM translator W262BL 100.3 FM Mobile). On January 29, 2018, W262BL/WMXC-HD2 changed its format to urban gospel, branded as "Hallelujah 100.3".

On its HD3 subchannel, WMXC rebroadcasts the talk radio programming of co-owned WNTM 710 AM.

=== Translator ===
Broadcast translator for WMXC-HD2
| Call sign | Frequency | City of license | FID | ERP (W) | HAAT | Class | Transmitter coordinates | FCC info |
|---|---|---|---|---|---|---|---|---|
| W262BL | 100.3 FM | Mobile, Alabama | 150837 | 250 | 127 m (417 ft) | D | 30°43′34.7″N 88°9′6″W | LMS |
