= Kenneth R. Giddens =

American broadcast executive (1908–1993)

Kenneth R. Giddens (September 10, 1908 – May 7, 1993) was an architect and movie theater owner, but most notably the broadcaster who put two radio stations and one television station based in Mobile, Alabama, on the air, all at one point in time bearing the call sign WKRG (only the TV station still has that callsign today). Giddens also served as director of the Voice of America longer than any other person in the broadcast service's history.

== Life ==
Giddens was born in Pine Apple, Alabama, in 1908. He attended Alabama Polytechnic Institute (now known as Auburn University) in 1928, studying architecture before graduating in 1931. Giddens used his newfound knowledge in the creation of a chain of movie theaters spanning three states, which would become the foundation of his journey into the young broadcasting industry. Kenneth's interest in broadcasting peaked when buying radio advertisements for his Giddens & Rester theaters. Giddens and his family would start up Mobile's new broadcast operation WKRG-TV, Inc. in 1946. Under Giddens' direction, radio station WKRG went on the air on September 26, 1946, followed by WKRG-FM in 1947, and WKRG-TV on September 5, 1955. While in Mobile, Giddens partnered in the construction of the city's first air-conditioned enclosed shopping mall called Bel Air Mall. Giddens contributions to broadcasting and his fellow man would not end in southwest Alabama and its surrounding areas, but continue in Washington, D.C., as the new director of the Voice of America starting in September 1969 until April 1977. Giddens also served as president of the Alabama Broadcasters Association and the National Broadcasters Association, where he was also part of its international committee. After Kenneth's death on May 7, 1993, the Giddens family continued his broadcast legacy until the WKRG radio stations were sold in 1994, and the TV station was sold in 1998; the former WKRG-AM is now WNTM, and WKRG-FM is now WMXC.

== Recognition ==
Kenneth Giddens was among the first inductees in the Communication Hall of Fame at the University of Alabama's College of Communication and Information Sciences. The college now recognizes Giddens as someone who has brought lasting fame to the state of Alabama, as said in the following statement: "Kenneth Giddens will be remembered for his many contributions to Alabama and the nation through his outstanding leadership as a businessman, broadcaster, and public servant."
