= WRKH =

Radio station in Mobile, Alabama

- Mobile, Alabama; United States
- Broadcast area: Mobile, Alabama; Pensacola, Florida
- Frequency: 96.1 MHz (HD Radio)
- Branding: 96.1 The Rocket

Programming
- Format: Classic rock
- Subchannels: HD2: 99.5 Kiss FM (Top 40 (CHR)); HD3: Radio by Grace (Christian radio)
- Affiliations: Premiere Networks

Ownership
- Owner: iHeartMedia, Inc.; (iHM Licenses, LLC)
- Sister stations: WKSJ-FM, WMXC, WNTM, WRGV, WTKX-FM

History
- First air date: 1964
- Former call signs: WLPR (1964–1987); WAVH (1987–1994); WMYC (1994–1996)
- Call sign meaning: "Rocket Hits"

Technical information
- Licensing authority: FCC
- Facility ID: 53142
- Class: C
- ERP: 73,000 watts; 77,000 watts (w/beam tilt)
- HAAT: 535 meters (1,755 ft)
- Transmitter coordinates: 30.689083°N 87.830278°W
- Translators: HD2: 99.5 W258AY (Mobile); HD3: 101.1 W266CM (Mobile)

Links
- Public license information: Public file; LMS
- Webcast: Listen live (via iHeartRadio); Listen live (via iHeartRadio) (HD2); Listen live (HD3)
- Website: 961therocket.iheart.com 995kissfm.iheart.com (HD2) radiobygrace.com (HD3)

WRKH (96.1 FM) is the call sign for the Mobile, Alabama classic rock formatted radio station known as "96.1 The Rocket". The station is owned by San Antonio–based iHeartMedia. Its studios are located inside the building of unrelated television station WKRG-TV on Broadcast Drive in Mobile, and the transmitter is near Spanish Fort, Alabama.

== Programming ==
The station is primarily classic rock. Since 2002, the station has competed with WZNF, a Gulfport, Mississippi, classic rock station. That station's signal can reach Mobile, WRKH's primary listening area. WRKH also broadcasts the syndicated John Boy and Billy Big Show on Monday-Saturday mornings, and Chip Nelson on afternoons. Starting with the 2016 season, as part of an agreement with iHeartMedia and the University of South Alabama, coverage of USA Jaguars football moved from WMXC to WRKH.

== HD Radio ==
On June 29, 2026, WRKH-HD2 flipped from "Sports Talk 99.5" to Contemporary hit radio as "99.5 Kiss FM, Mobile's Hit Music Station." The station features "The Alabama Show" in mornings, based out of 103.7 The Q (WQEN) in Birmingham, Alabama.

== Translators ==
Call sign	Frequency	City of license	FID	ERP (W)	HAAT	Class	Transmitter coordinates	FCC info	Notes
W258AY	99.5 FM	Mobile, Alabama	150854	250	148 m (486 ft)	D	30°44′6.7″N 88°7′16″W	LMS	Relays HD2
W266CM	101.1 FM	Mobile, Alabama	150912	250	101 m (331 ft)	D	30°43′34.7″N 88°9′6″W	LMS	Relays HD3
