= WBHY-FM =

- Mobile, Alabama; United States
- Broadcast area: Mobile, Alabama; Pensacola, Florida
- Frequency: 88.5 MHz
- Branding: Power 88

Programming
- Format: Contemporary Christian

Ownership
- Owner: Goforth Media, Inc.
- Sister stations: WBHY, WLPR

History
- First air date: 1992
- Former call signs: WAYF (1989–1991)

Technical information
- Licensing authority: FCC
- Facility ID: 24452
- Class: C1
- ERP: 100,000 watts
- HAAT: 269.5 meters
- Transmitter coordinates: 30°40′55″N 87°49′41″W

Links
- Public license information: Public file; LMS
- Webcast: Listen Live
- Website: www.goforth.org/Power88

WBHY-FM (88.5 MHz, "Power 88") is a radio station licensed to Mobile, Alabama and serves Mobile, Alabama and Pensacola, Florida. The station is owned by Goforth Media, Inc. It airs a Contemporary Christian music format.

The station was assigned the WBHY-FM call letters by the Federal Communications Commission on April 15, 1991.

Plans have been underway since December 2000 to increase power to 100 kW, as soon as funding for the upgrade becomes available. The station was finally granted a construction permit for 100 kW in late March 2017. (Taken from Alabama Broadcast Media Page)
