= Pensacola Christian College =

Liberal arts college in Pensacola, Florida

Coordinates: 30.4709°N 87.2325°W

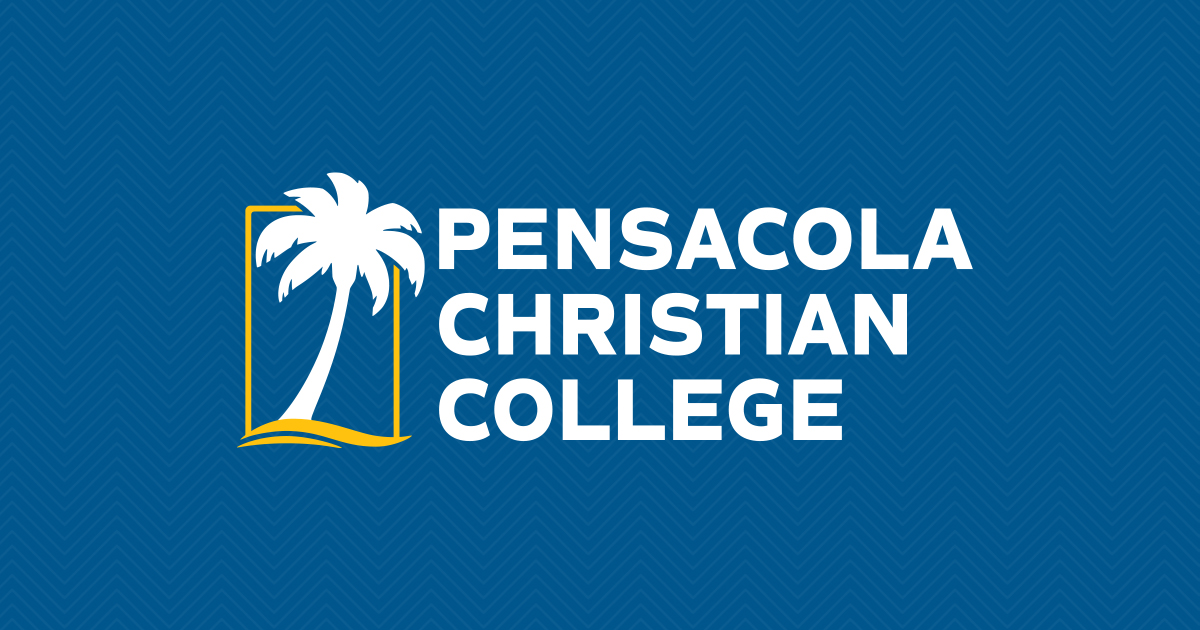
- Motto: Strength. Truth. Beauty.
- Type: Private college
- Established: 1974
- Founders: Arlin and Beka Horton
- Accreditation: TRACS-ABET-CCNE
- Religious affiliation: Non-Denominational
- President: Troy Shoemaker
- Students: 4,882 (2017)
- Location: Pensacola, Florida, U.S.
- Campus: 150 Acres
- Colors: Blue, white, yellow
- Nickname: Eagles
- Sporting affiliations: NCCAA Division II – South
- Mascot: Eagor the Eagle
- Website: www.pcci.edu

Pensacola Christian College (PCC) is a private Christian college in Pensacola, Florida, United States. Founded in 1974 by Arlin and Beka Horton, it has been accredited by the Transnational Association of Christian Colleges and Schools since 2013.

== History ==
Arlin and Beka Horton graduated from Bob Jones University in 1951, and moved to Pensacola, Florida, in 1952 to found a Christian grade school. That school, Pensacola Christian Grade School, opened in 1954; it was later renamed Pensacola Christian Academy.

In 1974, the Hortons opened Pensacola Christian College to further their vision of "Education from a Christian Perspective." The college had 100 students in its first year open, and was based in a single building, Ballard Hall.

Pensacola Theological Seminary, an extension of PCC's graduate school, was founded in 1998. Its avowed purpose is "to fill each student's mind and heart with what the Bible says."

In February 2012, Arlin Horton announced that he would be retiring from the ministry after May 2012. The school's board voted unanimously to install Troy Shoemaker, a PCC graduate, as president of the college. Shoemaker, a former administrator at Pensacola Christian Academy, completed his undergraduate education at PCC and holds a Doctor of Education degree from the institution as well as an education specialist degree from the University of West Florida. In July 2019, Shoemaker hired Jon Lands as the executive vice president. Lands completed his undergraduate education at PCC, graduating with a bachelor's degree in pastoral ministries. He also received his honorary doctorate from PCC in 2011.

A concert at the school on February 11, 2023, by the British a capella ensemble the King's Singers was cancelled with two hours' notice due to "concerns" about the "lifestyle" and sexual orientation of a member of the group. Pensacola Christian College's Articles of Faith classify homosexuality as a form of sexual immorality along with adultery, fornication, bestiality, incest, and use of pornography, citing passages in the Book of Matthew, the First Epistle to the Corinthians, and the Book of Hebrews.

== Gallery ==
The Four Winds, one of the main dining halls

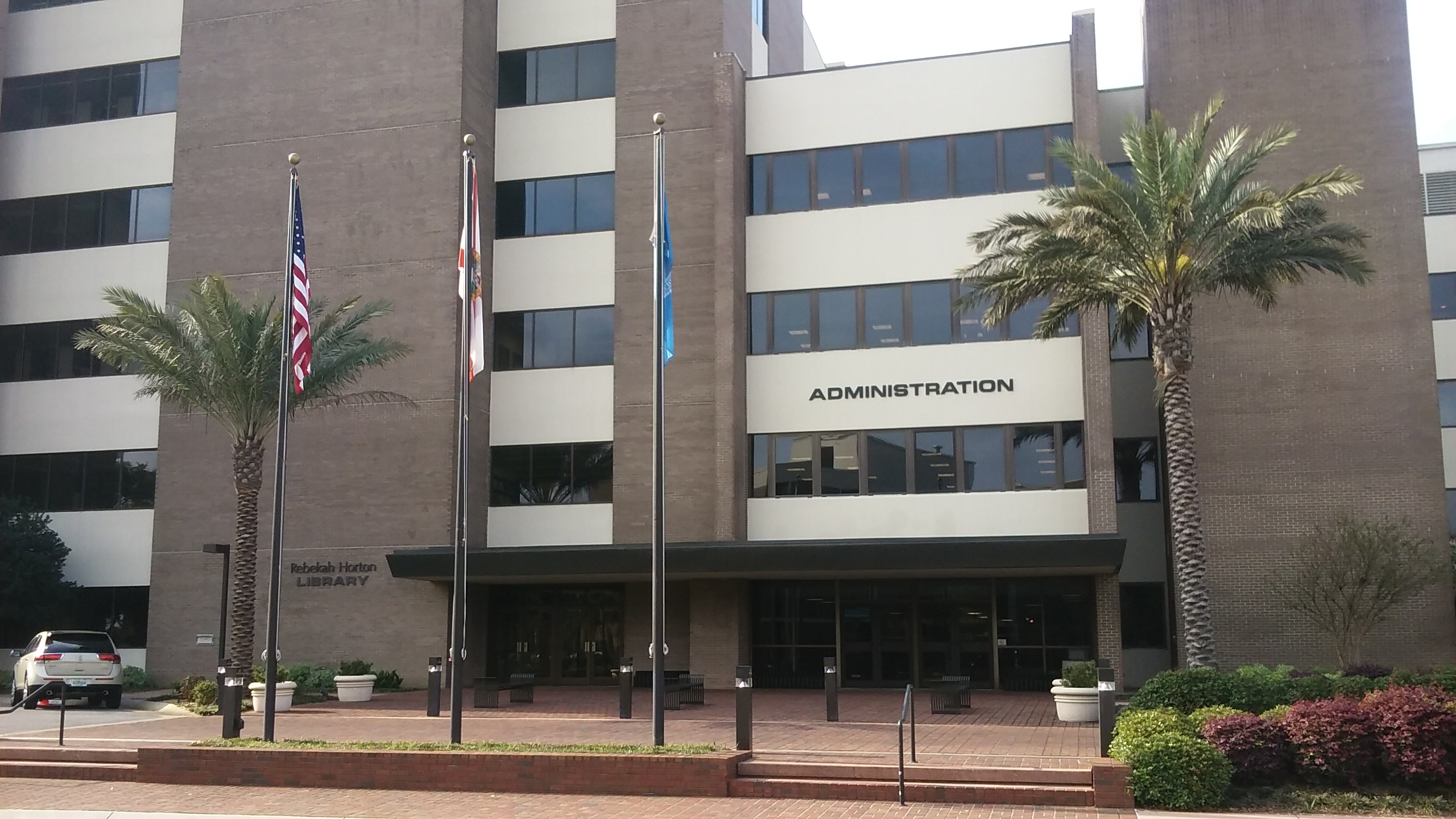
The main entrance to the academic and administration building

== Academics ==
PCC ensemble at Carnegie Hall

PCC has nine academic divisions including Bible, business, education, electrical engineering, mechanical engineering, and computer science, humanities, natural sciences, nursing, performing arts, and visual arts. Graduate degrees are offered through the graduate school at PCC and through Pensacola Theological Seminary in the fields of Bible, business administration, communicative arts, divinity, education, ministry, music, and nursing.

The college markets its education programs as being specifically intended to prepare educators for employment at Christian schools rather than public schools, though graduates of the programs have been eligible to apply for public school teacher certification in Florida since 2000.

Because the college accepts a literal interpretation of the Genesis creation narrative from the Bible and rejects evolution and other mainstream theories about the origins and age of Earth, students are taught young Earth creationism, and that God created the Earth in six literal 24-hour days. PCC's biology classes are based on creationism.

=== Accreditation ===
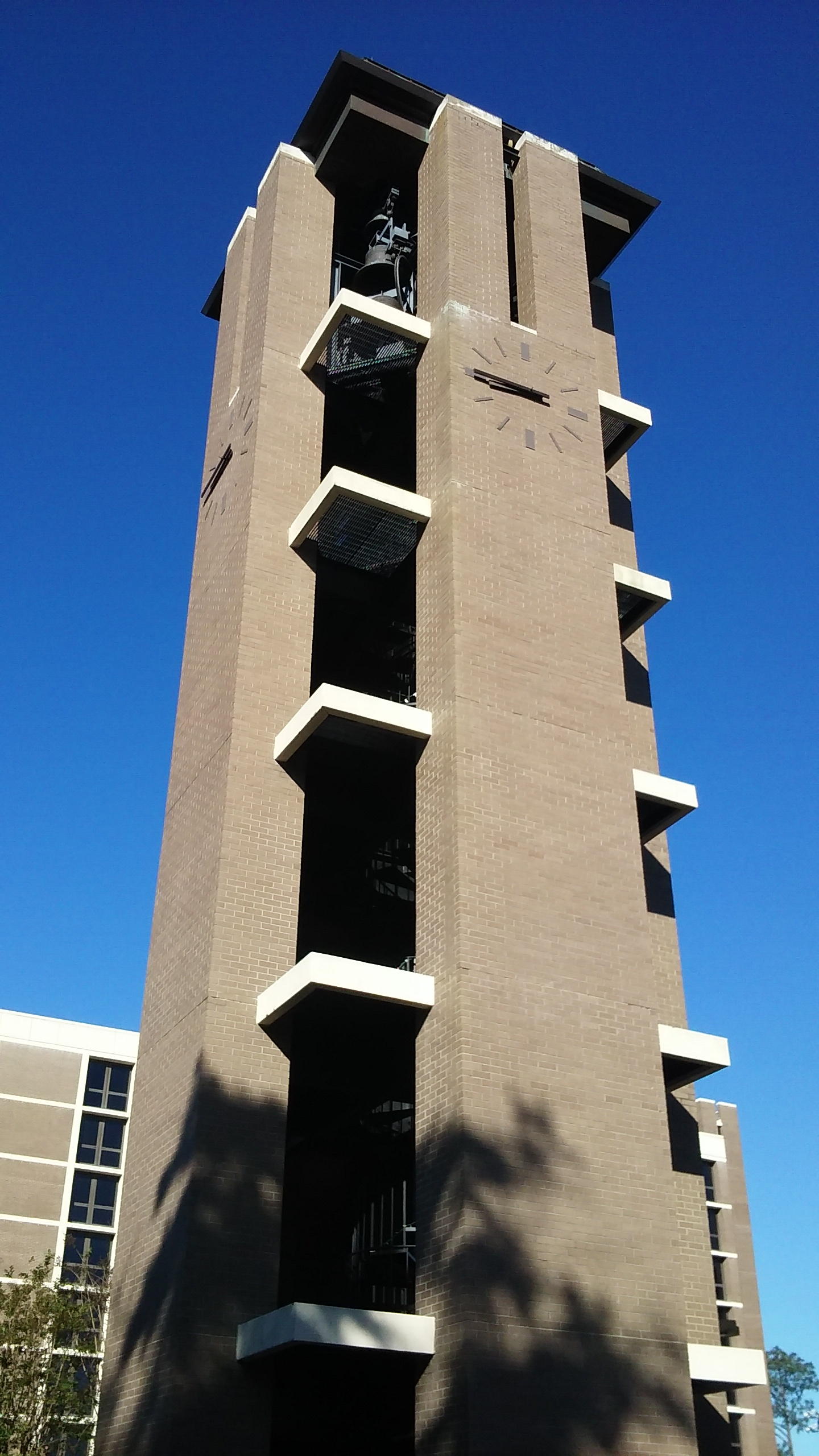
The Campanile at PCC

Since 2013, Pensacola Christian College has been accredited by the Transnational Association of Christian Colleges and Schools (TRACS), a religious institutional accreditation agency, to offer associates to doctorate degrees. However, Pensacola Christian College does not participate in any federal or state funded financial aid programs. In consequence, the college is exempt from federal guidelines concerning many forms of discrimination (e.g., Title IX of the Education Amendments of 1972), investigations into accusations of sexual abuse, and sharing of information about crimes on campus (Clery Act).

From 1974 until 2011, Pensacola Christian College did not seek accreditation. In numerous publications the school explained that it eschewed accreditation, indicating that an outside agency that did not share its religious and moral views might try to pressure the college to change or eliminate its beliefs. The college changed course on November 9, 2011, when the administration informed its students that PCC had been awarded candidacy for accreditation, a pre-accreditation status, by Transnational Association of Christian Colleges and Schools. In October 2013, PCC was officially accredited by TRACS.

The baccalaureate and master's degrees in nursing at Pensacola Christian College are also accredited by the Commission on Collegiate Nursing Education and the baccalaureate degrees in engineering are accredited by ABET, the national standard accreditation across major engineering schools.

== Student life ==
=== Athletics ===
The Arlin R Horton Sports Center

PCC participates in the National Christian College Athletic Association (NCCAA) for intercollegiate sports. Sports include men's basketball and soccer and women's basketball and volleyball. The men's wrestling team won the NCCAA national championship in 1994, 1995, 1996, and 1998, the last year before the NCCAA discontinued the sport. The Eagles men's basketball games as well as Lady Eagles basketball games and volleyball are played in the arena level of the Sports Center. PCC also hosts a number of invitational high school sporting tournaments and camps.

In addition to intercollegiate athletics, PCC students are also afforded the opportunity to play intramural sports through their Collegians. Sports offered through collegians include soccer, basketball, softball, volleyball, and broom hockey among others, and the Eagles have a cheerleading squad called the Blue Crew. Every fall Collegian Soccer culminates with the winners of the playoffs facing each other in the annual Turkey Bowl held over the Thanksgiving weekend. In the spring, students can play softball and basketball.

=== Recreation ===
The campus offers opportunities for individual or group recreation, such as the Arlin R. Horton Sports Center which opened in 1993. The Sports Center has facilities for ice skating, bowling, racquetball, miniature golf, table tennis, and weight lifting. A 2008 expansion by Hewes & Company, LLC added a waterpark with a FlowRider Double and water cannons, an inline skating track, a rooftop sun deck, a snack bar, and climbing walls. This makes PCC the only college in the country to have a FlowRider. The campus also has the John Ray Hall Field House, the former home of Eagle men's basketball, in which students can play basketball, swim, work out in the weight room, and play tennis. The West Campus has 24 Hobie catamarans with classes "offered in sailing, kayaking, swimming, and lifeguarding."

=== Academia ===
PCC offers many collegiate clubs and opportunities for its students to grow academically. The newest addition to these clubs, is the forming of a student chapter on campus of IEEE-the largest organization of electrical engineers in the country. PCC recently competed at IEEE's SoutheastCon robotics competition.

=== Rules and regulations ===
PCC guidelines cover various aspects of student life, such as dress, hairstyles, residence hall upkeep, borrowing, and internet access. For example, "All students are expected to dress modestly,and ... men are not to wear effeminate hairstyles or apparel."

PCC also prohibits some kinds physical contact and interaction between unwed members of the opposite sex. Mixed groups must obtain a "3+ Pass" to hang out off campus. Generally, men and women are not allowed to ride in the same vehicle to a destination without an approved chaperone. Students over the age of 23 are not required to have a chaperone on a date, but cannot go to a beach or a park after dark for safety reasons.

Other prohibited activities at PCC include "fornication, adultery, homosexual behavior, or any other sexual perversion. Also, any involvement in pornography or sexual communications, including verbal, written, or electronic." In addition, "most forms of dancing," profanity, hazing, discrimination, gambling, stealing and "witchcraft, séances, astrology, or any other satanic practices" are also banned. Students are also not allowed to use, possess, or "associate" with alcohol, tobacco, and illicit drugs. Policy violations also include visiting movie theaters, patronizing unauthorized area businesses, being off campus after hours, and being in a residence hall belonging to a member of the opposite sex.

==== Demerits and discipline ====
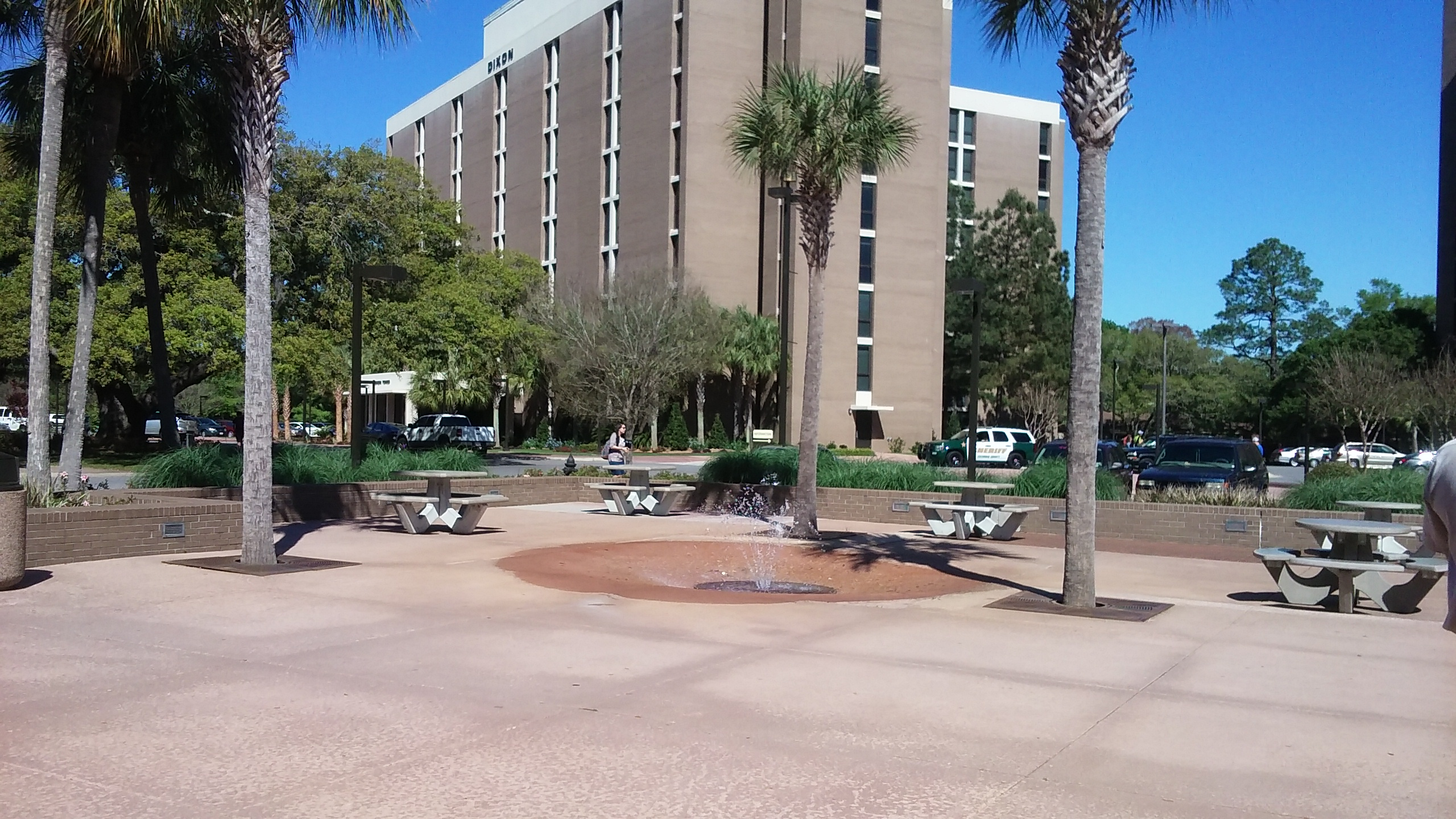
Area outside of the student union, known as the Commons building

PCC has three levels of enforcement; students can be given "infractions," "demerits," or be expelled. The school operates a "demerit" system where "demerits" are "recorded on a student's record for the purpose of limiting continued misconduct, given for continued neglect of responsibilities or for more serious offenses." Students may be given notices, charges, demerits, or be expelled. Students who have these demerits are subject to administrative review by the Student Court, during which demerits are assigned or canceled corresponding to the degree of the infraction or circumstantial conditions surrounding the incident in question."

In the past (at least until 2008), students who acquired a certain number of demerits in a semester were "campused," meaning they were not allowed to leave campus for a period of time. Students suspected of more serious violations could be subject to being "shadowed," where they were assigned to a Residence Assistant (a fellow student who was selected by PCC to provide leadership in the residence hall and to enforce college regulations). This included being required to attend the Residence Assistant's classes and moving to the Residence Assistant's room. While being shadowed the student was prohibited from speaking with any student other than with the Floor Leader who was shadowing them.

The rules and disciplinary policies at Pensacola Christian College have been the subject of criticism. In 1996 a PCC alumnus started an electronic newsletter entitled The Student Voice, which criticized PCC, particularly the school's rules and demerit system. It was originally published in a newsletter format distributed exclusively via e-mail, and it was later published online. Following numerous attempts by the college to have the website shut down through arbitration and lawsuits, the website's owners relinquished control of the domain to the college, who has redirected the domain to the main PCC website.

=== Faith and Bible versions ===
PCC rejects hyper-Calvinism, Modernism, Neo-orthodoxy, and the modern day charismatic movement and specifically states that "Pensacola Christian is not a part of the 'tongues movement' and does not allow students to participate in or promote any charismatic activities, nor do we permit students to promote hyper-Calvinism."

PCC also states the belief that the Textus Receptus is the most honest Greek text of the Bible and upon this basis uses the King James Version of the Bible for all pulpit ministry and classroom Bible instruction, as it gives an eloquence and academic value.

== Affiliated organizations of PCC ==
=== The Congressional Library of Cathy McMorris Rodgers ===
PCC recently opened the Congressional Library of Cathy McMorris Rodgers, a former congresswoman and representative who decided the college would be the home of her congressional library. According to PCC, "The focal collection is the Cathy McMorris Rodgers Congressional Archive. The exhibit houses papers and artifacts donated by the respected alumna, making PCC the seventh college or university in Florida to hold such an exhibit."

=== Campus Church ===
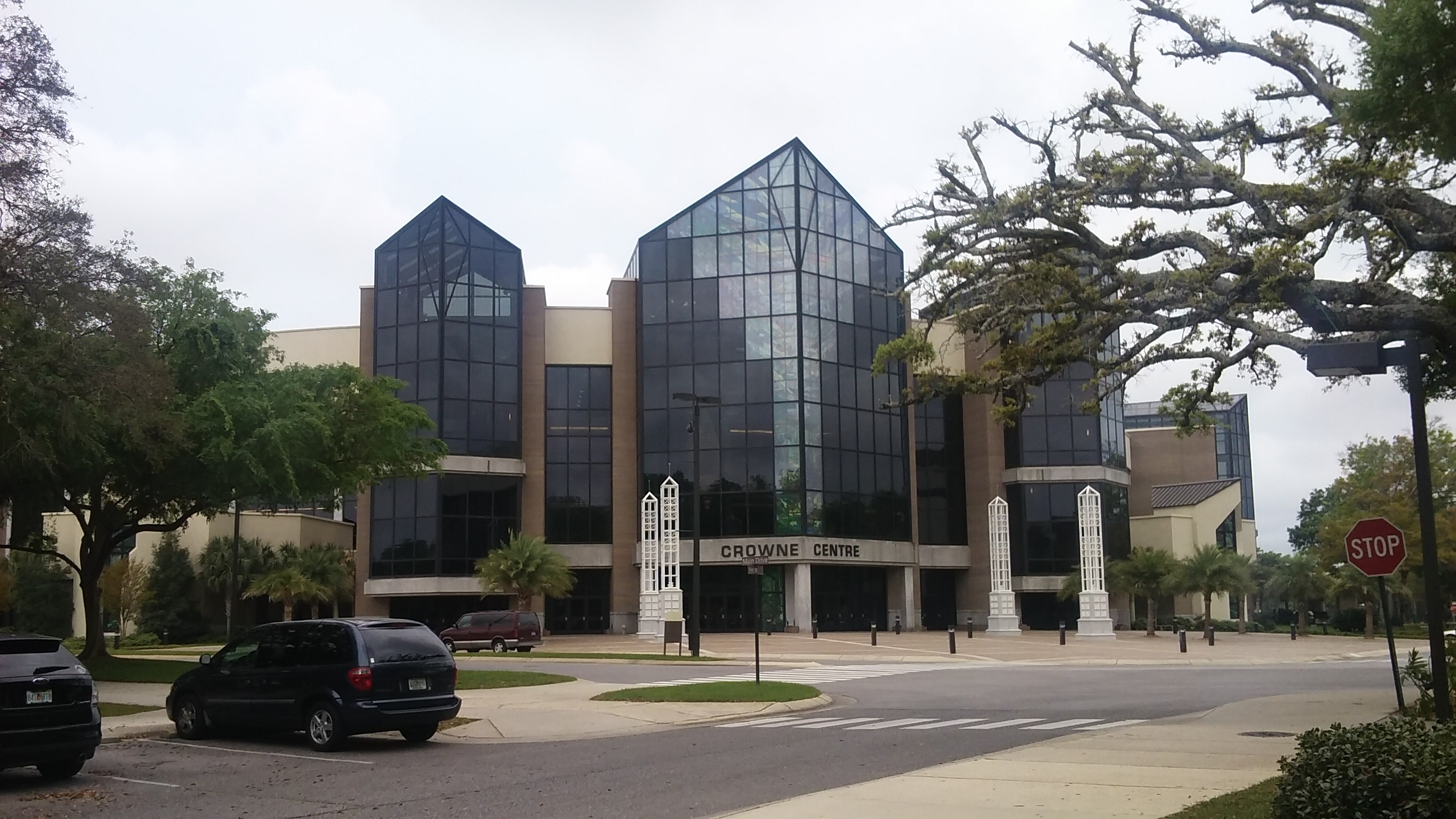
The Crowne Center, which serves as an auditorium and campus church, was built in 2001

The Campus Church, an Independent Baptist church, meets in the 6,200-seat, 314,000 square feet (29,200 m^{2}) Crowne Center on Pensacola Christian College's campus and has Sunday morning, evening and Wednesday evening services. The Campus Church is not a department of the college, but is a separate entity operating alongside the college.

=== Rejoice in the Lord ===
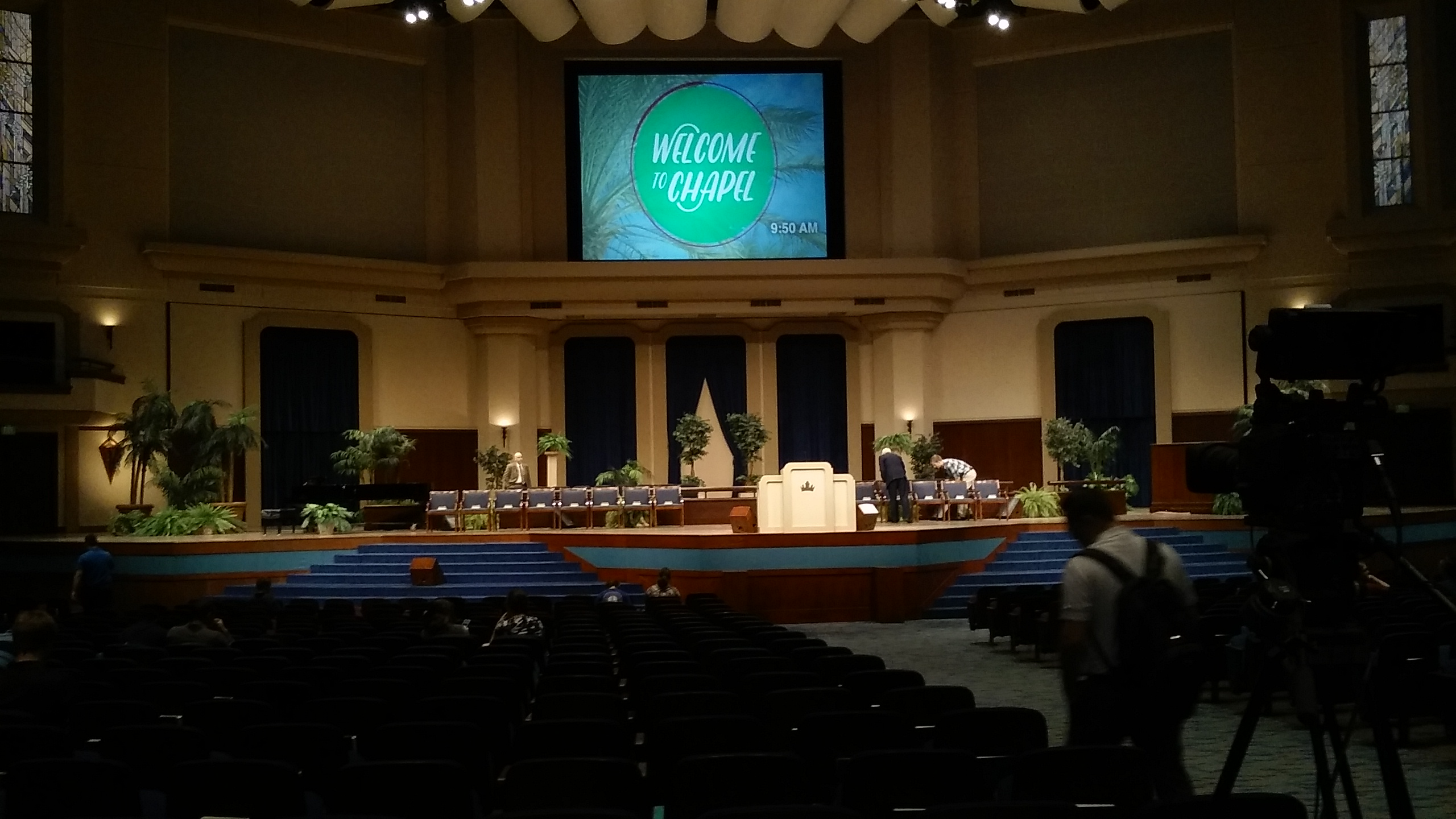
Crowne Center Auditorium

The Campus Church holds weekly services from the Crowne Center at Pensacola Christian College. The services are recorded and edited for the weekly television broadcast of Rejoice in the Lord. The programming of Rejoice in the Lord consists of musical numbers performed by the Rejoice Choir, various PCC musical ensemble groups, congregational singing recorded in the Campus Church and preaching by Pastor Jeff Redlin. The hour-long television program is broadcast at 8 p.m. Eastern on Sundays on the Daystar Television Network.

=== WPCS ===
Pensacola Christian College owns radio station WPCS 89.5 FM, known on-air as Rejoice Radio. WPCS is the main station of the Rejoice Broadcasting Network (sometimes referred to as "RBN"). The content heard on Rejoice Radio consists primarily of inspirational music and syndicated Christian radio programming.

=== Abeka ===
Abeka, formerly known as A Beka Book, is a publisher affiliated with Pensacola Christian College that produces K–12 curriculum materials that are used by Protestant fundamentalist and other conservative Evangelical Christian schools, as well as non-fundamentalist Christian schools and homeschooling families around the world. It is named after Rebekah Horton, wife of college president Arlin Horton, both of whom founded both PCC and Abeka, administering them simultaneously. Abeka and BJU Press (formerly Bob Jones University Press) have been considered the two major publishers of Christian-based educational materials in America.

Abeka has been criticized for selling works that do not follow a scientific consensus regarding the origins of the universe, origins of life, and evolution. In Association of Christian Schools International et al. v. Roman Stearns et al., a judge upheld the University of California's rejection of Abeka publications for preparatory use because the books are "inconsistent with the viewpoints and knowledge generally accepted in the scientific community."

In 1996, state and federal agencies requested millions of dollars of unpaid taxes between 1988 and 1995 from A Beka Book, at the time a division of PCC. In a settlement without any admission of wrongdoing, Pensacola Christian College paid $44.5 million in federal taxes. The organization also voluntarily paid $3.5 million Florida state taxes in full even though it had received legislative relief from them and no longer bore any legal liability for them, to avoid any appearance of offense or subsidization by the state. Amy Yohe is the administrator of Abeka.

=== Chris-Tex ===
Chris-Tex is a public foundation based in Pensacola, Florida, that was founded in 1998 made to function as the investment and endowment manager for Pensacola Christian College. For the fiscal year 2022, revenue was $61 million with assets reported of $1.36b.

== Notable alumni ==
- Joshua Dunlap: American lawyer who has served as a United States circuit judge of the United States Court of Appeals for the First Circuit since 2025.
- Maria Boren: Job candidate on the second season of NBC's reality TV show, The Apprentice in 2004
- James Van Huss: Tennessee politician Huss graduated from PCC with a degree in computer science in 2003.
- John Libka: professional baseball umpire for Major League Baseball
- Garrett Mason: Maine politician Mason graduated from PCC with a degree in management in 2006.
- Cathy McMorris Rodgers: Washington politician
- Wendi Stearman, former Oklahoma state representative
- Phil Green, Michigan representative
- Christy Stuzman, Indiana representative
