= WLPR (AM) =

Prichard, Alabama; United States
- Broadcast area: Mobile, Alabama
- Frequency: 960 kHz

Programming
- Format: Southern Gospel
- Affiliations: Salem Communications

Ownership
- Owner: Goforth Media, Inc.
- Sister stations: WBHY, WBHY-FM

History
- First air date: 1986
- Former call signs: WGRR (1983–1989)

Technical information
- Licensing authority: FCC
- Facility ID: 24454
- Class: D
- Power: 6,000 watts (day); 32 watts (night)
- Transmitter coordinates: 30°45′50″N 88°06′36″W
- Translators: 93.3 W227DA (Mobile); 106.9 W295BB (Daphne)

Links
- Public license information: Public file; LMS
- Website: www.goforth.org/WLPR960

WLPR (960 AM, "Solid Gospel 960 AM") is a radio station licensed to serve Prichard, Alabama, United States. The station is owned by Goforth Media, Inc.

WLPR broadcasts a Southern Gospel music format to the Mobile, Alabama, area. The station features programming from Salem Communications.

== History ==
This station received its original construction permit from the Federal Communications Commission on July 29, 1983. The new station was assigned the call letters WGRR by the FCC on October 11, 1983. WGRR received its license to cover from the FCC on February 27, 1987.

The station had the FCC change its callsign to the current WLPR call letters on April 1, 1989.

In January 1994, Mobile Broadcast Service, Inc., reached an agreement to sell this station to Goforth Media, Inc. The deal was approved by the FCC on April 11, 1994, and the transaction was consummated on July 7, 1994.
