= WIJD =

- Prichard, Alabama; United States
- Broadcast area: Mobile, Alabama
- Frequency: 1270 kHz
- Branding: Truth Talk 1270; Truth Talk 97.9

Programming
- Format: Christian Talk

Ownership
- Owner: Wilkins Communications Network, Inc.; (Mobile Bay Corporation)

History
- First air date: 1954 (as WAIP)
- Former call signs: WAIP (1954–1962); WSIM (1962–1966); WZAM (1966–1973); WKSJ (1973–1977; 1978–1981; 1983–2003); WXLK (1977–1978); WLLF (1981–1983)

Technical information
- Licensing authority: FCC
- Facility ID: 53144
- Class: D
- Power: 5,000 watts day 103 watts night
- Transmitter coordinates: 30°44′44″N 88°5′40″W
- Translator: 97.9 W250CB (Mobile)

Links
- Public license information: Public file; LMS
- Webcast: WIJD 1270 Listen Live; WIJD 97.9 Listen Live
- Website: WIJD 1270 Online; WIJD 97.9 Online

WIJD (1270 AM) is a radio station licensed to the community of Prichard, Alabama, United States, and serves the greater Mobile, Alabama, area. The station is owned by Wilkins Communications Network Inc. and the license is held by the Mobile Bay Corporation. It airs a Christian talk radio format.

== History ==
This station signed on in the 1954 as WAIP, a daytime-only station with a country music format. In the early 1960s, under the ownership of Holt Broadcasting, it flipped to an easy listening format with the call letters WSIM (for "Wonderful Sound In Mobile"). The station briefly flipped to Top 40 then changed callsigns to WZAM and resumed a country format. In 1965, Kenneth S. Johnson bought the station, later changing its call letters to WKSJ in 1973 as a complement to and simulcast of country formatted WKSJ-FM. In the early 1980s, the station was briefly a Music of Your Life station known as WLLF, before switching back to country music within two years.

The AM station finally broke from simulcasting the FM's country format on June 30, 1997, when it became a talk radio station with the tagline "Your Station for Life". In April 1999, the station flipped to a syndicated adult standards format, and flipped again in 2001 to a syndicated talk radio format as "Impact 1270". The station changed callsigns again to WIJD on October 1, 2003. This corresponded with a brief experiment as a simulcast of the contemporary Christian music format of WGCX in Pensacola, Florida, before returning to talk. The station returned to religious broadcasting full-time in the summer of 2004.

In April 2006, Satellite Radio Network (Michael Glinter, president) reached an agreement to sell WIJD to Wilkins Communications Network Inc. (Robert Wilkins, president) for a reported sale price of $450,000.

In 2012, Wilkins Radio started broadcasting on its FM translator (W239AP) at 95.7 in Mobile, Alabama. The programming on FM is a simulcast of WIJD AM 1270. The translation is operating as W250CB at 97.9 as of December 12, 2016.
