= WBHY (AM) =

Mobile, Alabama; United States
- Frequency: 840 kHz
- Branding: Christian 840

Programming
- Format: Christian radio
- Affiliations: Salem Radio Network

Ownership
- Owner: Goforth Media, Inc.
- Sister stations: WBHY-FM, WLPR

History
- First air date: 1948
- Former call signs: WKAB (1948–1962); WTUF (1962–1969); WMOB (1969–1982); WWAX (1982–1984)

Technical information
- Licensing authority: FCC
- Facility ID: 24453
- Class: D
- Power: 10,000 watts (day only)
- Transmitter coordinates: 30°45′50″N 88°6′36″W
- Translators: 103.3 W277CS (Spanish Fort); 103.5 W278AP (Mobile)

Links
- Public license information: Public file; LMS
- Website: www.goforth.org/Christian840

WBHY (840 AM, "Christian 840") is a radio station broadcasting a Christian radio format. Licensed to Mobile, Alabama, United States, the station serves the greater Mobile area. The station is currently owned by Goforth Media, Inc. and features programming from the Salem Radio Network.

The station was assigned the WBHY call letters by the Federal Communications Commission on December 23, 1984.
