= WKRG-TV =

Television station in Mobile, Alabama

- Mobile, Alabama; Pensacola, Florida; United States
- City: Mobile, Alabama
- Channels: Digital: 20 (UHF); Virtual: 5
- Branding: WKRG 5; WKRG News 5

Programming
- Affiliations: 5.1: CBS; 5.2: CW; for others, see § Technical information and subchannels

Ownership
- Owner: Nexstar Media Group; (Nexstar Media Inc.)
- Sister stations: WFNA

History
- First air date: September 5, 1955
- Former channel numbers: Analog: 5 (VHF, 1955–2009); Digital: 27 (UHF, 1999–2019)
- Call sign meaning: Kenneth R. Giddens (station founder)

Technical information
- Licensing authority: FCC
- Facility ID: 73187
- ERP: 961 kW
- HAAT: 578 m (1,896 ft)
- Transmitter coordinates: 30°41′20.4″N 87°49′50.6″W

Links
- Public license information: Public file; LMS
- Website: www.wkrg.com

WKRG-TV (channel 5) is a television station licensed to Mobile, Alabama, United States, serving southwest Alabama and northwest Florida as an affiliate of CBS. It is owned by Nexstar Media Group alongside CW outlet WFNA (channel 55). The two stations share studios with several radio stations owned by iHeartMedia on Broadcast Drive in southwest Mobile; WKRG-TV's transmitter is located in unincorporated Baldwin County near Spanish Fort, Alabama.

== History ==
WKRG-TV first signed on the air September 5, 1955. The station was founded by the architect and movie theater owner Kenneth R. Giddens, who also put WKRG radio (710 AM, now WNTM, and 99.9 FM, now WMXC) on the air. Owing to the radio station's ties with the CBS Radio Network, WKRG-TV has served as the market's CBS affiliate from its sign-on. It is the only commercial station in the market that has never changed its primary affiliation. WKRG-TV originally operated from studios located on St. Louis Street in downtown Mobile until around 1982, when it relocated its operations to an area near the Bel Air Mall, which Giddens also had a hand in developing. The TV station operates on the bottom floor while the radio stations operate on the second and third floors of the building.

Giddens originally had a 20% stake in WKRG-TV, and the other stakes were held by local businesses and colleges. On April 4, 1958, Giddens sold 50% of the station to Mobile Press-Register, Inc. He regained full control of the station in 1966.

For years, WKRG-TV was the only locally owned station in the Mobile–Pensacola–Pascagoula area. This changed after the death of Giddens in 1993. The radio stations were sold off in 1994, although they remain housed in the same building as the television station. Spartan Communications purchased WKRG-TV in 1998; the station then came under the ownership of Media General after it purchased Spartan in 2000. The station celebrated its 60th year of broadcasting in 2015.

In 2007, WKRG entered into a radio partnership with Clear Channel Communications (now iHeartMedia), in effect re-establishing ties with former sister stations WNTM and WMXC, as well as WKSJ-FM (94.9 FM) and WRKH (96.1 FM). The radio stations were previously partnered with NBC affiliate WPMI-TV (channel 15), an association that ended as a result of Clear Channel selling its television stations (including WPMI) to Newport Television in 2008.

Between the early 1980s and 2012, WKRG served as the default CBS affiliate for the eastern half of the Pascagoula–Biloxi, Mississippi market as that market did not have a CBS affiliate of its own; WKRG was available to cable subscribers in Biloxi and Gulfport, Mississippi, and usually serves the area's "B" CBS station behind New Orleans affiliate WWL-TV. This changed in 2012, when ABC affiliate WLOX signed an affiliation agreement to carry CBS programming on one of its digital subchannels.

On March 21, 2014, LIN Media entered into an agreement to merge with Media General in a $1.6 billion deal. Because LIN had already owned Fox affiliate WALA-TV and CW affiliate WFNA (channel 55), and WKRG and WALA rank among the four highest-rated stations in the Mobile–Pensacola market in total day viewership, the companies were required to sell either WKRG or WALA to another station owner in order to comply with FCC ownership rules as well as planned changes to those rules regarding same-market television stations which would prohibit sharing agreements. On August 20, 2014, Media General announced that it would keep WKRG and WFNA, and sell WALA to Meredith Corporation.

On September 8, 2015, less than nine months after the previous purchase was approved and finalized, Media General announced that it would acquire the Meredith Corporation for $2.4 billion, with the combined group to be renamed Meredith Media General if the sale had been finalized. Because Meredith recently acquired WALA as a required divestment from the LIN Media acquisition, and the two stations continue to rank among the four highest-rated stations in the Mobile–Pensacola market in total day viewership, the companies would once again have been required to sell either WKRG or WALA to comply with FCC ownership rules as well as recent changes to those rules regarding same-market television stations that restrict sharing agreements; sister station WFNA could have legally been acquired by Meredith Media General either by maintaining its new duopoly with WKRG or reuniting it with WALA, as its total day viewership ranks below the top-four ratings threshold. However, on January 27, 2016, Nexstar Broadcasting Group announced that it had reached an agreement to acquire Media General, resulting in the termination of Meredith's acquisition by Media General. The merger with Nexstar reunited WKRG with Panama City sister station WMBB, which was sold by Media General in 2008 to Hoak Media and eventually was acquired by Nexstar after Hoak merged with Gray Television, the owner of its closest competitor, which required its sale.

== Programming ==
Shows that aired on WKRG in the past include Woman's World, The Popeye Show, Rosie's Place and Small Fry News, a show featuring local fifth graders. WKRG-TV was also the longtime home of Congressional Report from 1973 to 2006, billed as the longest-running program of its kind in the nation, featuring local members of Congress giving viewers a local perspective of Washington, D.C., and the central Gulf Coast from their standpoint.

On September 7, 2017, a video of WKRG meteorologist Alan Sealls covering Hurricane Irma, Hurricane Jose, and Hurricane Katia went viral on Reddit and YouTube.

=== Notable former on-air staff ===
- Jack Drees
- Estella Payton
- Alan Sealls
- Mel Showers
- John Edd Thompson

== Technical information and subchannels ==
The station's signal is multiplexed:

Subchannels of WKRG-TV
| Subchannel | Res. | Short name | Programming |
|---|---|---|---|
| 5.1 | 1080i | WKRG-HD | CBS |
| 5.2 | 1080i | GC CW | The CW (WFNA) |
| 5.3 | 480i | WKRGANT | Antenna TV |
| 5.4 | 480i | Outlaw | Outlaw |
| 5.5 | 480i | ION TV | Ion |
| 55.1 | 1080i | WFNA-TV | The CW (WFNA) |

Simulcast of subchannels of another station
Broadcast on behalf of another station

WKRG replaced the Retro Television Network with MeTV on its third digital subchannel in September 2011.

On September 25, 2025, Antenna TV replaced MeTV on WKRG 5.3. Antenna TV is also owned by Nexstar.

=== Analog-to-digital conversion ===
WKRG-TV discontinued regular programming on its analog signal, over VHF channel 5, on June 12, 2009, the official date on which full-power television stations in the United States transitioned from analog to digital broadcasts under federal mandate. The station's digital signal remained on its pre-transition UHF channel 27, using virtual channel 5.
