= WABF =

WABF may refer to:

- WABF (AM), a radio station (1480 AM) licensed to serve Mobile, Alabama, United States
- WBAI, a radio station (99.5 FM) licensed to serve New York, New York, United States, which held the call sign WABF from 1941 to 1953
- WERM (AM), a radio station (1220 AM) licensed to serve Fairhope, Alabama, United States, which held the call sign WABF from 1961 to 2017
- WZEW, a radio station (92.1 FM) licensed to serve Fairhope, Alabama, United States, which held the call sign WABF-FM from 1966 to 1973
- the ICAO code for Kornasoren Airport
