= WDXZ =

WDXZ may refer to:

- WJNZ (AM) (1000 AM), a radio station in Robertsdale, Alabama, which held the call sign WDXZ from 1999 to 2004 and from 2013 to 2016
- WBZR-FM (105.9 FM), a radio station in Atmore, Alabama, which held the call sign WDXZ in 2004
- WRFQ (FM) (104.5 FM), a radio station in Mount Pleasant, South Carolina, which held the call sign WDXZ from 1985 to 1993
- WSPA-FM (106.3 FM), a radio station in Simpsonville, South Carolina, which held the call sign WDXZ from 1995 to 1999
