= WBZR =

WBZR may refer to:

- WBZR-FM, a radio station (105.9 FM) licensed to Atmore, Alabama, United States
- WJNZ (AM), a radio station (1000 AM) licensed to Robertsdale, Alabama, which held the call sign WBZR from 2010 to 2013
