= WERM (disambiguation) =

WERM is a radio station (1220 AM) licensed to serve Fairhope, Alabama, United States.

WERM or Werm may also refer to:

- WFGF, a radio station (92.1 FM) licensed to serve Wapakoneta, Ohio, United States, which held the call sign WERM from 1965 to 1978
- WABF (AM), a radio station (1480 AM) licensed to serve Mobile, Alabama, United States, which held the call sign WERM from 2014 to 2017
- Werm, Belgium, a village in the municipality of Hoeselt, province of Limburg
