= USS Arkansas (SSN-800) =

US Navy Virginia-class submarine

History

United States
- Name: USS Arkansas
- Namesake: State of Arkansas
- Ordered: 28 April 2014
- Builder: Newport News Shipbuilding, Newport News, Virginia
- Laid down: 19 November 2022
- Sponsored by: Melba Pattillo Beals, Minnijean Brown-Trickey, Elizabeth Eckford, Gloria Ray Karlmark, Carlotta Walls LaNier and Thelma Mothershed-Wair (members of Little Rock Nine)
- Christened: December 7, 2024
- Identification: Hull number: SSN-800

General characteristics
- Class & type: Virginia-class submarine
- Displacement: 7,800 tons
- Length: 377 ft (115 m)
- Beam: 34 ft (10.4 m)
- Draft: 32 ft (9.8 m)
- Propulsion: S9G reactor auxiliary diesel engine
- Speed: 25 knots (46 km/h)
- Endurance: can remain submerged for up to 3 months
- Test depth: greater than 800 ft (244 m)
- Complement: 15 officers; 120 enlisted men
- Armament: 12 x VPT tubes for Tomahawk BGM 109 Cruise missiles, 4 x 21 inch (530 mm) torpedo tubes for Mk-48 torpedoes UGM-84 Harpoon

USS Arkansas (SSN-800) is a Virginia-class nuclear powered attack submarine of the United States Navy. She is the twenty-seventh boat of the class and the fifth vessel to be named for the U.S. state of Arkansas. She was ordered on 28 April 2014, and named during a ceremony on 15 June 2016 by Secretary of the Navy Ray Mabus. Arkansas's keel was laid on 19 November 2022 at Newport News Shipbuilding.

== Service History ==
=== Construction ===
On 27 September 2023, Huntington Ingalls Industries, which oversees Newport News Shipbuilding, announced that the pressure hull of Arkansas had been completed. On 7 December 2024, the submarine was christened by Carlotta Walls LaNier, a member of the Little Rock Nine, at HII's Newport News Shipbuilding Division in Newport News, Virginia.

== In popular culture ==
A fictionalized version of Arkansas was featured in the 2018 film Hunter Killer, which was based on the novel Firing Point by George Wallace and Don Keith.
