= WNWT =

WNWT may refer to:

- WNWT-LD, a low-powered television station (channel 3, virtual 37) licensed to serve New York, New York, United States
- WPAY (AM), a radio station (1520 AM) licensed to serve Rossford, Ohio, United States, which held the call sign WNWT from 2008 to 2017
- WNSP, a radio station (105.5 FM) licensed to serve Bay Minette, Alabama, United States, which held the call sign WNWT from 1992 to 1993
