= WCSN =

WCSN can refer to:

- WCSN-FM, a radio station (105.7 FM) in Orange Beach, Alabama, United States
- WCSN-LD, a low-power television station (channel 26, virtual 32) in Columbus, Ohio, United States
- World Championship Sports Network, an NBC Sports cable television network, now Universal Sports
