= Operation Sunshine (USS Nautilus) =

United States Navy scientific expedition

Operation Sunshine was a scientific expedition conducted by the United States Navy in the summer of 1958. A crew of just over 100 sailors piloted USS Nautilus (SSN-571) under the North Pole. Nautilus was chosen for the mission because her nuclear reactor allowed her to remain submerged longer than a conventional submarine. The mission was completed successfully on August 3, 1958, when Nautilus and crew crossed under the North Pole.

== Vanguard ==
One of the "fronts" of the Cold War was a technology race between the governments of the United States and the Soviet Union. There was tension between the two governments over nuclear weapons, and a "space race" developed during the late 1950s, in which each government aimed to demonstrate its superiority through demonstrations of scientific and technological advances. Russia celebrated the successful launch of their Sputnik I satellite into orbit in October 1957. Shortly after, the United States attempted to launch their Vanguard I satellite, which exploded before lifting off.

Soviet researchers were ahead of their U.S. counterparts in rocket technology, and the American public was aware of this technology gap. There was concern that the Soviet government would be able to use the same rockets that had propelled Sputnik to launch nuclear-armed missiles at targets within the United States. President Eisenhower's aim was to speed the development of U.S. rocketry to keep pace with the Soviets, but also to minimize American fears related to this technological disparity. Eisenhower needed something to show Americans, and the rest of the world, that there were technological areas in which the U.S. government was ahead of the Soviets. The chosen solution was to combine submarine technology and nuclear reactor technology – two areas where U.S. science was ahead of the Soviets – in order to create a technological showpiece to reinforce American public perception.

== Nautilus ==
USS Nautilus was the first nuclear submarine built for the U.S. armed forces. She was designed by Admiral Hyman G. Rickover. Rickover ordered the hull of the boat built at Electric Boat Company in Groton, Connecticut, while the reactor was built and tested in Idaho.

== Mission ==
It was not enough that the United States had just built a nuclear submarine, Nautilus had to be tested to show how much more advanced the technology was. Ideas were bounced around including for Nautilus and USS Skate (SSN-578) to complete a submerged lap around the Earth. Until Nautilus commander, William Anderson, suggested the submerged trip under the North Pole, it had not even been considered.

Nautilus departed from Groton on 19 August 1957 for the first attempt at sailing under the Pole, but was unsuccessful because of the ice being too deep. Another attempt was not made until the next summer. On 23 July 1958, Nautilus left the Pearl Harbor naval base heading north towards the Bering Strait. The submarine and crew crossed under the pole at 2315 on August 3 and continued for four more days until exiting from under the polar ice northeast of Greenland where Commander Anderson radioed to the President the message, "Nautilus 90 North".

Even the second attempt did not go without issues, the crew having to deal with large amounts of ice blockage as well as mechanical failures aboard the sub. The hope was that the mission was timed to where the ice levels in the Arctic would be at their lowest making it easier to navigate through the waters under the pole without hitting the bottom or the top with the periscope. The expedition was also used as a testing ground not only for the sub, but as an opportunity for the Navy to experiment with different types of navigational equipment.

An example of such research related to navigation by compass. Normally a ship or small craft relies on a magnetic compass which works by comparing one's position to magnetic north. A major flaw with magnetic compasses is that magnetic north is not exactly on the North Pole but south of it so the crew was experimenting with a new design of the gyro-compass. As they inched farther north, the gyro-compass was much more reliable than the magnetic which pointed in nearly the opposite direction.
