= WJNZ (AM) =

- Robertsdale, Alabama; United States
- Broadcast area: Mobile, Alabama
- Frequency: 1000 kHz
- Branding: Talk Radio 1000

Programming
- Format: Talk

Ownership
- Owner: Noah Britt; (Tri City Radio, LLC)
- Sister stations: WERM, WCSN-FM

History
- First air date: 1985
- Former call signs: WXWY (1984–1999); WDXZ (1999–2004); WNSI (2004–2010); WBZR (2010–2013); WDXZ (2013–2016)

Technical information
- Licensing authority: FCC
- Facility ID: 50377
- Class: D
- Power: 1,000 watts (day only)
- Transmitter coordinates: 30°32′13″N 87°42′18″W

Links
- Public license information: Public file; LMS
- Webcast: WJNZ Listen Online

WJNZ (1000 AM, "Talk Radio 1000") is a daytime-only American radio station licensed to serve the community of Robertsdale, Alabama. The station, launched in 1985, is owned and operated by Noah Britt, through licensee Tri City Radio, LLC.

== Programming ==
WJNZ broadcasts a talk format.

On August 16, 2012, the station's transmitter was damaged by lightning and the station had fallen temporarily silent. WBZR-FM continued to broadcast, dropping the AM call sign from its branding.

On February 20, 2013, the call sign of WBZR was changed to WDXZ and it was launched as a Southern gospel format to separate it from the FM in Atmore, which continued to broadcast country music. The station returned to the air full-time on February 25, 2013.

== History ==
=== Launch ===
This station received its original construction permit for a new 1,000 watt AM station broadcasting at 1000 kHz from the Federal Communications Commission on July 25, 1984. The new station was assigned the call letters WXWY by the FCC. WXWY received its license to cover from the FCC on April 30, 1985.

=== Sale to Bowen ===
In December 1993, Opal Carrol Coley reached an agreement to sell this station to Bowen Broadcasting, Inc. The deal was approved by the FCC on January 19, 1994, and the transaction was eventually consummated on August 2, 1994. However, a complication arose and the license reverted to Coley. In June 1995, Opal Carrol Coley reached another agreement to sell this station, this time to JTL Broadcasting. The deal was approved by the FCC on October 26, 1995, and the transaction was consummated on November 15, 1995.

In March 1999, JTL Broadcasting reached an agreement to sell this station to Gulf Coast Broadcasting Company, Inc. The deal was approved by the FCC on May 19, 1999, and the transaction was consummated on June 9, 1999. On November 16, 1999, the new owners had the FCC assign new call letters WDXZ for "Dixie" to match the station's country music format.

In February 2001, Gulf Coast Broadcasting Company, Inc. (R. Lee Hagan, principal) reached an agreement to sell this station to Great American Radio Network, Inc. (Walter J. Bowen, owner) for a reported sale price of $180,000. The deal was approved by the FCC on March 16, 2001, and the transaction was consummated on August 24, 2001.

=== WNSI years ===
The station was assigned the WNSI call letters by the FCC on April 6, 2004, after a swap with a sister station in preparation for a switch from country music to news/talk on June 4, 2004.

In March 2006, Great American Radio Network, Inc. (Walter Bowen, president) announced an agreement to sell WNSI along with sister stations WNSI-FM and WBCA to Gulf Coast Broadcasting Inc. (R. Lee Hagan, president) for a reported combined sale price of $550,001. At the time of the announcement, WNSI aired a sports/talk radio format. The deal was dismissed at the request of the applicants on May 17, 2006, and the transaction was never consummated so the license remained with Great American Radio Network Inc.

=== Acquisition by Gulf Coast Broadcasting ===
In March 2010, the broadcast license for WNSI was involuntarily transferred from Great American Radio Network, Inc., to Lonnie L. Mixon, acting as the Chapter 11 bankruptcy trustee. The station was assigned new call letters WBZR by the FCC on May 4, 2010. In July 2010, the trustee reached an agreement to sell WBZR to Gulf Coast Broadcasting Company, Inc., for $190,000 in settlement of the owner's debts. This bankruptcy sale, along with sister station WBZR-FM, for a combined price of $410,000 is at a significantly reduced from the March 2006 agreement with Gulf Coast for $550,001. The sale was formally consummated on September 27, 2010.

Before switching to its classic country format, WBZR broadcast a news/talk radio format. Local programming included "The Morning Buzz" with Dale Jones and The Sports Table hosted by Scott Moore. Syndicated programming included talk shows hosted by Glenn Beck, Fred Thompson, Dave Ramsey, Dennis Miller, Dr. Dean Edell, Jim Bohannon, Leo Laporte, and Phil Valentine.

On January 28, 2013, an Application was filed with the Federal Communications Commission seeking consent to the Assignment of Broadcast Licenses of Radio Stations WBZR (AM), Robertsdale, Alabama and WBZR-FM, Atmore, Alabama from Gulf Coast Broadcasting, Inc., to 21st Century Broadcasting, Inc.

WBZR (AM) operates on an assigned frequency of 1000 Kilohertz, with an effective radiated power of 1 Kilo...watts and WBZR-FM operates on an assigned frequency105.9 Megahertz, with an effective radiated power of 5.5 Kilowatts. The Officer, Director and Shareholder with 10% or more interest in Gulf Coast Broadcasting, Inc., is R. Lee Hagan. The Officers, Directors with 10% or more interest in 21st Century Broadcasting, Inc., are Norma Jean Lewis and Bryan Covey. A copy of the Assignment Application is available for public inspection on-line at www.fcc.gov, or can be viewed in person during regular business hours at: the WBZR Studios located at 301 North Main Street Atmore Al right behind Coleys heating and ac.

On February 26, 2013, Gulf Coast Broadcasting Co., Inc. asked for a silent STA for WDXZ-A/Robertsdale, AL while new equipment was installed.

On August 5, 2013, WDXZ returned to the air full-time.

In November 2014, WDXZ changed their format to sports, branded as "The Game".

Gulf Coast Broadcasting sold WDXZ to Noah Britt's Tri City Radio, LLC in a transaction that was consummated on March 8, 2015. The purchase price was $65,000.

On July 1, 2016, WDXZ changed their call letters to WJNZ.

== Controversy ==
Former owner Walter Bowen made national headlines in 2008 due to a dispute over music licensing with the performance rights organization known as the American Society of Composers, Authors and Publishers. The WNSI and WNSI-FM combo did not itself play music—the clips at issue were played during the syndicated Dave Ramsey Show—and hadn't since a June 2004 switch from country music to talk radio. Bowen, upset by ASCAP's refusal to reduce his licensing fee from about $80 per month to the talk radio rate of $17 per month, stopped paying the fee altogether. Citing the airing of two song clips in September 2006 on the Ramsey program, ASCAP sued Bowen's Great American Radio Network, Inc., for damages. Bowen's attorneys and ASCAP reached a $15,000 settlement with a payment plan but Bowen refused to pay, calling the settlement "legal extortion". In September, 2010, Bowen was sentenced to ten years in prison for sexual abuse of a girl under the age of 12
