= WBZR-FM =

- Atmore, Alabama; United States
- Frequency: 105.9 MHz
- Branding: Hot Country 105.9

Programming
- Format: Country
- Affiliations: CBS Radio News

Ownership
- Owner: Larry and Earnest White; (Tri-County Broadcasting Inc.)
- Sister stations: WERM, WJNZ, WCSN-FM

History
- First air date: 1991
- Former call signs: WYDH (1991–2004); WDXZ (4/04-10/04); WNSI-FM (2004–2010)

Technical information
- Licensing authority: FCC
- Facility ID: 51140
- Class: A
- ERP: 5,500 watts
- HAAT: 100 meters (328 feet)
- Transmitter coordinates: 31°02′14″N 87°29′42″W

Links
- Public license information: Public file; LMS

WBZR-FM (105.9 FM, "Hot Country 105.9") is an American radio station licensed to serve Atmore, Alabama. The station, which began regular broadcast operations in 1991, is currently owned and operated by Larry and Earnest White, through licensee Tri-County Broadcasting Inc.

== Programming ==
WBZR-FM broadcasts a country music format specializing in country music from the 1970s and 1980s, with a few songs from the 1950s, 1960s, and 1990s. WBZR-FM programming is available on the web via streaming audio to listeners around the world.

The majority of WBZR-FM's daytime programming was normally simulcast on its sister station, the then-WBZR (1000 AM). The AM station's transmitter was damaged by lightning on August 16, 2012, and that station is temporarily dark.

== History ==
=== Launch ===
This station received its original construction permit for a new 3,700 watt FM station broadcasting at 105.9 MHz from the Federal Communications Commission on December 7, 1990. The new station was assigned the call letters WYDH by the FCC on February 1, 1991. WYDH received its license to cover from the FCC on August 7, 1991.

In July 1992, original owner Alabama Native American Broadcasting, reached an agreement to sell this station to PCI Communications, Inc. Alabama Native American Broadcasting was a partnership between family members Randy Dale Gehman, Martin Eby Gehman, Vernie L. Gehman, Martin Gerald Gehman, and David Wayne Gehman. The deal was approved by the FCC on August 14, 1992.

In October 1994, PCI Communications, Inc., agreed to sell this station to Creek Indian Enterprises. The deal was approved by the FCC on November 15, 1994, and the transaction was consummated on the same day.

In December 1997, Creek Indian Enterprises reached an agreement to sell this station to Southern Media Communications, Inc. The deal was approved by the FCC on March 4, 1998, and the transaction was consummated on May 22, 1998.

=== Changing signs ===
The station applied for a change in callsigns and was assigned WDXZ by the FCC on April 26, 2004. Less than six months later, on October 4, 2004, the station's call letters were changed again, this time to WNSI-FM.

In March 2006, parent company Great American Radio Network, Inc. (Walter Bowen, president) announced an agreement to sell WNSI-FM along with sister stations WNSI and WBCA to Gulf Coast Broadcasting Inc. (R. Lee Hagan, president) for a reported combined sale price of $550,001. At the time of the announcement, WNSI aired a sports/talk radio format. The deal was dismissed at the request of the applicants on May 17, 2006, and the transaction was never consummated so the license remained with Great American Radio Network Inc.

=== Controversy ===
Station owner Walter Bowen made national headlines in 2008 due to a dispute over music licensing with the performance rights organization known as the American Society of Composers, Authors and Publishers. The WNSI and WNSI-FM combo did not itself play music—the clips at issue were played during the syndicated Dave Ramsey Show—and hadn't since a June 2004 switch from country music to talk radio. Bowen, upset by ASCAP's refusal to reduce his licensing fee from about $80 per month to the talk radio rate of $17 per month, stopped paying the fee altogether. Citing the airing of two song clips in September 2006 on the Ramsey program, ASCAP sued Bowen's Great American Radio Network, Inc., for damages. Bowen's attorneys and ASCAP reached a $15,000 settlement with a payment plan but Bowen refused to pay, calling the settlement "legal extortion".

=== Acquisition by Gulf Coast Broadcasting ===
In March 2010, the broadcast license for WNSI-FM was involuntarily transferred from Southern Media Communications, Inc., to Lonnie L. Mixon, acting as the Chapter 11 bankruptcy trustee. The station was assigned new call letters WBZR-FM by the FCC on May 4, 2010. In July 2010, the trustee reached an agreement to sell WBZR-FM to Gulf Coast Broadcasting Company, Inc., for $220,000 in settlement of the owner's debts. This bankruptcy sale, along with sister station WBZR, for a combined price of $410,000 is at a significantly reduced from the March 2006 agreement with Gulf Coast for $550,001. The sale was formally consummated on September 27, 2010., following Bowen's conviction for child sex abuse.

On November 2, 2010, the station received its license to cover changes completed in 2008 after full repairs to its broadcasting equipment damaged by Hurricane Ivan in 2004.

=== Acquisition by Tri-County Broadcasting Inc. ===
On January 28, 2013, an Application was filed with the Federal Communications Commission seeking consent to the Assignment of Broadcast Licenses of Radio Stations WBZR, Robertsdale, Alabama, and WBZR-FM, Atmore, Alabama, from Gulf Coast Broadcasting, Inc., to 21st Century Broadcasting, Inc.

While this transaction was never consummated, WBZR-FM's license was assigned to Larry and Earnest White's Tri-County Broadcasting Inc. effective November 25, 2014, at a purchase price of $140,000.
