= Jamie Moss =

American screenwriter

- Born: Canada
- Citizenship: United States
- Occupation: Screenwriter
- Writing career
- Language: English
- Genres: Screenwriting, film

Jamie Moss is an American screenwriter.

== Filmography ==
- Street Kings (2008)
- X-Men: First Class (2011, uncredited)
- Rise of the Planet of the Apes (2011, uncredited)
- Spectral (2016)
- Ghost in the Shell (2017)
- Hunter Killer (2018)
