= WZEW =

Radio station in Fairhope–Mobile, Alabama

- Fairhope, Alabama; United States
- Broadcast area: Mobile, Alabama
- Frequency: 92.1 MHz (HD Radio)
- Branding: 92 ZEW

Programming
- Format: Adult album alternative
- Subchannels: HD2: 96.5 The Crab (Classic rock, Blues); HD3: 92.5 The Bandit (Classic country)
- Affiliations: Westwood One; Crimson Tide Sports Network

Ownership
- Owner: Dot Com Plus, LLC
- Sister stations: WNSP

History
- First air date: August 28, 1966 (as WABF-FM)
- Former call signs: WABF-FM (1966–1973); WGOK-FM (1973–1978); WHSP-FM (1978–1982); WZEW (1982–1994); WGCX (1994–1997)

Technical information
- Licensing authority: FCC
- Facility ID: 74287
- Class: C3
- ERP: 20,500 watts
- HAAT: 110.6 meters (363 ft)
- Transmitter coordinates: 30°31′23″N 88°6′32″W
- Translators: HD2: 96.5 W243CY (Mobile); HD3: 92.5 W223BX (Saraland)

Links
- Public license information: Public file; LMS
- Webcast: Listen Live
- Website: 92zew.net thecrabfm.net (HD2); 92.5 The Bandit (HD3)

WZEW (92.1 FM) is an adult album alternative-formatted broadcast radio station licensed to Fairhope, Alabama, serving the Mobile, Alabama metropolitan area. WZEW and sister station WNSP broadcast the two-story building at 824 Western America Dr. (the stations were previously located at the former Smith Bakery building on Dauphin St.) in Mobile, Alabama, and WZEW's transmitter is south of Theodore, Alabama.

The station was launched as WABF-FM on August 28, 1966, as a simulcast of sister station WABF. In the 1970s, it became an urban dance-formatted station as WGOK, and then religious as WHSP. In the early 1980s, the station was renamed WZEW (on air as 92ZEW) and began broadcasting an eclectic mix of alternative and local music. It was purchased again and returned as WZEW. It has broadcast alternative and local music ever since.

WZEW is owned and operated by Dot Com Plus, LLC, and is the only remaining locally owned music station based in Mobile. As of 2018, Dot Com Plus, LLC added two new stations 96.5FM THE CRAB which plays Rock and Blues genres and 92.5FM which previously played Soul and R&B as The SOUL of Mobile but has since been rebranded as 92.5 THE BANDIT which plays classic country.

== History ==
=== Early years (1966–1981) ===
WABF-FM first began broadcasting on August 28, 1966, as a simulcast of sister station WABF. In December 1973, the station was purchased by WGOK Inc. and renamed WGOK-FM, broadcasting an urban dance format. It was acquired by Christ for the World Foundation in 1978 and renamed WHSP (for With Holy Spirit Power).

=== WZEW, debut, and demise (1982–1996) ===
In November 1982, the station was purchased by Shores BCSTG, and was assigned the call letters WZEW by the FCC on June 3, 1982. The following year, the station was sold to Sherri Brice and Don Keith, who "moved the antenna from a pecan grove in Fairhope (where the station was originally licensed)," to the top of the First Southern Tower in downtown Mobile. who enlisted Catt Sirten (1955-2023) to helm its first broadcast. The station as familiar today began on September 1, 1984, when it began broadcasting album-oriented rock (AOR) with "Jungleland" by Bruce Springsteen. The station became known for its eclectic mix of alternative and local music. WZEW received its license to cover from the FCC on April 28, 1986.

On June 19, 1989, it was acquired by WZEW Inc. for $750,000.

=== Return to airwaves (1997–present) ===
In June 1997, the Baldwin Broadcasting Company reached an agreement to sell the station to American General Media through their AGM-Nevada, LLC, subsidiary. The deal was approved by the FCC on August 5, 1997. This change revived the album adult alternative format and the call letters WZEW. It was sold back to Baldwin Broadcasting Company on October 1, 1998, for $1.4 million. In 2000, Barry Wood, co-owner of Baldwin Broadcasting Company, filed for bankruptcy. An application was made to transfer control of WZEW to DotCom Plus, LLC. The transfer was approved by the FCC on February 21, 2007, and the transaction was consummated on May 22, 2007.

== Notable former staff ==
The original staff of WZEW, from the early 1980s, included Catt Sirten, John Guidry, Phil Coulloudon, Wendy, Uncle Tim, and Terry James. In 2013, the station parted ways with Emily Hayes, best known as the host of 92NEW (a new music showcase), when a potential conflict of interest arose from her involvement with local entity Mod Mobilian.

== Programming ==
In addition to its daily adult album alternative format, the station also broadcasts Radio Avalon, "an eclectic nightly musical blend that has included New Age, jazz, worldbeat and other styles." On Sundays, the station broadcasts Catt's Sunday Jazz Brunch, another jazz showcase. Both programs are hosted by station veteran Catt Sirten. Jazz Brunch debuted on WZEW in 1984, but later moved to WHIL-FM, where Avalon began. Both moved from WHIL to WZEW in 2008.
