= USS Arkansas =

USS Arkansas may refer to one of these ships of the United States Navy named in honor of the 25th state.

- USS Arkansas (1863), a screw steamer originally named the Tonawanda that served in the American Civil War. After that war, she was renamed Tonowanda, and lost off Key Largo in 1866.
- USS Arkansas (BM-7), an Arkansas-class monitor with a single gun turret. She was one of the last monitors of the U.S. Navy, commissioned in 1902, but having her name changed to the USS Ozark in 1906. Scrapped in 1922.
- USS Arkansas (BB-33), one of two Wyoming-class battleships, commissioned in 1912. One of the oldest ships of World War II, she was expended and wrecked in an atomic bomb test at Bikini Atoll in July 1946, where her wreckage still lies.
- USS Arkansas (CGN-41), one of four Virginia-class nuclear-powered guided missile cruisers; commissioned in 1980 and decommissioned in 1998.
- USS Arkansas (SSN-800), a Virginia-class nuclear-powered attack submarine, announced in June 2016.

== See also ==
- CSS Arkansas
