= Robin Beard =

American politician

Robin Jerald Beard Jr.
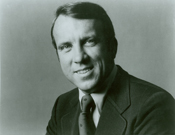

Member of the U.S. House of Representatives from Tennessee's 6th district
- In office January 3, 1973 – January 3, 1983
- Preceded by: William R. Anderson
- Succeeded by: Don Sundquist (Redistricting)

Personal details
- Born: August 21, 1939 Knoxville, Tennessee, U.S.
- Died: June 16, 2007 (aged 67) Isle of Palms, South Carolina, U.S.
- Cause of death: Brain cancer
- Party: Republican
- Spouse: Catherine Beard
- Education: Vanderbilt University

Military service
- Allegiance: United States
- Branch/service: United States Marine Corps
- Rank: Colonel

Robin Jerald Beard Jr. (August 21, 1939 – June 16, 2007) was an American politician who served as a Republican member of the United States House of Representatives from Tennessee's 6th congressional district, who served from 1973 to 1983.

== Early life ==
Beard was born in Knoxville, Tennessee. He was educated at Montgomery Bell Academy and graduated from Vanderbilt University, where he was a member of the Sigma Chi fraternity. He was a former colonel in the United States Marine Corps Reserve.

== Political career ==
In 1970, Beard was appointed Tennessee personnel commissioner by newly elected Republican Governor Winfield Dunn. In 1972, he entered the GOP primary for the newly reconfigured 6th Congressional District. The district had been significantly redrawn by the state legislature, which shifted several Republican-trending portions near Memphis into the Sixth and removed several solidly Democratic areas.

In November, Beard defeated Anderson by twelve percentage points. Beard's victory was not considered an upset, given the considerably more Republican bent of the redrawn district. Beard worked this district well over the next decade, building up a large following in a district where most of the living residents had never been represented by a Republican before. However, conservative Democrats continued to hold most of the district's seats in the state legislature well into the 1980s.

Proving just how Republican this district had become at the national level, Beard was easily reelected in 1974 with 56.6 percent of the vote even as Republicans across the country were turned out of office due to anger over Watergate. In 1976, Beard faced former Senator Ross Bass, who had represented the 6th from 1955 to 1964. However, Beard turned back this challenge fairly easily, winning by almost 29 points. Despite his name recognition, Bass was unable to overcome the challenge of running in territory that he did not know and that did not know him. Beard took over 74 percent of the vote in 1978, and was unopposed in 1980.

Beard did not run for a sixth term in the 1982 elections, opting instead to run for the Republican nomination to oppose freshman Democratic Senator Jim Sasser. While Beard won the primary, he lost in a massive 20-point landslide. The Republicans would not win another statewide race until 1994, when they captured the governorship and both Senate seats.

Beard was appointed as a NATO deputy secretary-general in Belgium from 1984 to 1987, and from 1992 to 1995.

Beard later ran a Washington, D.C.–based import-export business and was at one time a resident of Alexandria, Virginia. Beard retired to Charleston County, South Carolina, where he later ran for a seat on the county school board in 2006 (Arthur Ravenel Jr., also a former U.S. Representative, ran successfully in the race.)

== Death ==
Beard died from a brain tumor in Isle of Palms, South Carolina. His funeral was held at the Huguenot Church in Charleston, South Carolina.

U.S. House of Representatives
Preceded by William R. Anderson	Member of the U.S. House of Representatives from Tennessee's 6th congressional district 1973–1983	Succeeded by Albert Arnold Gore, Jr.
Party political offices
Preceded by Bill Brock	Republican nominee for United States Senator from Tennessee (Class 1); 1982	Succeeded by Bill Andersen
