= Hunter Killer (film) =

2018 film by Donovan Marsh

- Theatrical release poster
- Directed by: Donovan Marsh
- Screenplay by: Arne Schmidt; Jamie Moss
- Based on: Firing Point by: Don Keith; George Wallace
- Produced by: Neal H. Moritz; Toby Jaffe; Gerard Butler; Alan Siegel; Tucker Tooley; Mark Gill; John Thompson; Matt O'Toole; Les Weldon
- Starring: Gerald Butler; Gary Oldman; Common; Linda Cardellini; Toby Stephens
- Cinematography: Tom Marais
- Edited by: Michael J. Duthie
- Music by: Trevor Morris
- Production companies: Millennium Media; Original Film; G-BASE; Relativity Media; Tucker Tooley Entertainment
- Distributed by: Summit Premiere (through Lionsgate)
- Release date: October 26, 2018 (United States)
- Running time: 121 minutes
- Country: United States
- Languages: English; Russian
- Budget: $40 million
- Box office: $31.7 million

Hunter Killer is a 2018 American action thriller film starring Gerard Butler and Gary Oldman. Based on the 2012 novel Firing Point by Don Keith and George Wallace, the film follows a submarine crew and a group of United States Navy SEALs who rescue the captured Russian President from a coup. Directed by Donovan Marsh and written by Arne Schmidt and Jamie Moss, it features Michael Nyqvist (in his penultimate film role), Common, Linda Cardellini and Toby Stephens in supporting roles.

Hunter Killer was released in the United States on October 26, 2018, by Summit Premiere. The film bombed at the box-office and received mixed reviews from critics, who saw it as "an undemanding, by-the-numbers actioner".

== Plot ==
The U.S. Los Angeles-class submarine USS Tampa Bay disappears while shadowing the Russian Akula-class submarine RFS Konek in the Barents Sea. Rear Admiral John Fisk orders the newly promoted and unconventional Commander Joe Glass to lead the investigation on board the Virginia-class submarine USS Arkansas.

At the same time, Lieutenant Bill Beaman leads a Navy SEAL team on a covert mission to observe a Russian naval base in Polyarny, Murmansk Oblast. At the base, the SEALs witness Defense Minister Admiral of the Fleet Dmitriy Durov staging a coup d'état and capturing Russian President Nikolai Zakarin. They quickly realize that Durov's intention is to instigate a war. The SEALs narrowly avoid detection during a radio intercept check by the Russians but Martinelli is shot in the leg by a Russian officer who blindly fires at their concealed position. Consequently, the team is forced to leave him behind.

Meanwhile, Arkansas makes a distressing discovery as they come across the wreckage of Tampa Bay, with no survivors found. Additionally, they stumble upon the sunken Russian submarine Konek, which appears to have been damaged from within, indicating possible internal sabotage rather than an external attack. Their situation takes a turn for the worse when they are ambushed by another Russian submarine, the Akula-class submarine RFS Volkov, which had been concealed beneath an iceberg. It becomes evident that Volkov was responsible for the unprovoked torpedoing of Tampa Bay. However, Arkansas manages to retaliate and successfully rescues the Russian survivors from Konek, including their commanding officer, Captain 2nd rank Sergei Andropov.

The U.S. government uncovers the coup, leading Admiral Charles Donnegan to recommend war preparations. However, Fisk suggests that Arkansas should rendezvous with Beaman's team once they rescue Zakarin. Glass persuades the hesitant Andropov to provide assistance and must also convince his crew to accept Andropov's presence and trust him. Utilizing Andropov's expertise in navigating the challenging underwater terrain and the minefield guarding the base, Glass successfully guides Arkansas near the base undetected.

Beaman's team manages to save Oleg, an agent of the Russian Presidential Security Service, who was previously shot while protecting Zakarin by Durov's men. They work together to infiltrate the base and successfully retrieve President Zakarin, but lose Oleg, Devin Hall, and Matt Johnstone in the process. With Martinelli providing sniper cover, Beaman brings the injured president to Arkansas's deep-submergence rescue vehicle and then returns alone to rescue Martinelli.

As the U.S. and Russian fleets prepare for battle, Arkansas suffers more damage when it is attacked by the Udaloy-class destroyer RFS Yevchenko, Andropov's old ship, which is now under the command of Captain Vlade Sutrev, a member of Durov's conspiracy. However, Andropov manages to convey a message to the Yevchenko that President Zakarin is on board the submarine. When Durov instructs his forces at the base to fire missiles at the surfaced Arkansas, Glass refuses to take action, realizing that retaliating could initiate the war he is trying to prevent.

In the final moments, Andropov's former crew disobey orders and successfully destroy the incoming missiles with their close-in weapon system before they can hit the Arkansas. They then proceed to destroy the naval base headquarters with their own missiles, killing Durov. With the war avoided, Glass docks the Arkansas at the Russian naval base to return Zakarin and the surviving Konek crew members to their country. The Arkansas picks up Beaman and Martinelli and leaves Polyarny, escorted by the Russian Navy.

== Cast ==
- Gerard Butler as Commander Joe Glass, Captain USS Arkansas
- Gary Oldman as CJCS Charles Donnegan
- Common as RADM John Fisk
- Michael Nyqvist as Captain Andropov, RFS Konek
- Stefan Ivanov as Captain, RFS Volkov
- Hristo Mitzkov as sonar operator, RFS Volkov
- Linda Cardellini as Jayne Norquist, National Security Agency
- David Gyasi as COB Wallach, USS Arkansas
- Shane Taylor as TMC Turner, USS Arkansas
- Sarah Middleton as Liddy, radio operator, USS Arkansas
- Gabriel Chavarria as Jimenez, DSRV pilot, USS Arkansas
- Ryan McPartlin as Matt Johnstone, U.S. Navy SEAL
- Carter MacIntyre as Lt. Commander Brian Edwards, XO USS Arkansas
- Zane Holtz as Paul Martinelli, U.S. Navy SEAL
- Taylor John Smith as Belford, ST, USS Arkansas
- Michael Trucco as Devin Hall, U.S. Navy SEAL
- Michael Gor as Admiral Dmitriy Durov, Minister of Defence
- Alexander Diachenko as President Zakarin
- Igor Jijikine as Tretiak, Russian Special Forces
- Yuri Kolokolnikov as Oleg, Presidential Security
- Ilia Volok as Captain Vlade Sutrev, RFS Yevchenko
- Caroline Goodall as President Dover
- Toby Stephens as Bill Beaman, U.S. Navy SEAL
- Christopher Goh as Navigator Park, USS Arkansas

== Production ==
Relativity Media first purchased the spec script, written by Arne Schmidt and adapted from the novel Firing Point, in 2008. Pierre Morel was in talks to direct. In February 2011, Variety reported that Phillip Noyce was hired to direct the film. John Kolvenbach and Jamie Moss provided rewrites to the script; the latter's rewrites was what interested Noyce to direct. Production was set to begin at the end of the year before Noyce left the project, citing similarities between other films that he previously helmed, and moved on to films like Above Suspicion. Antoine Fuqua was later hired to replace him, and a release date was set for December 21, 2012. Gerard Butler was cast as Joe Glass and Sam Worthington was considered for Bill Beaman. Fuqua and Butler later left production to work on Olympus Has Fallen, and the film remained in development hell as directors like McG and Steven Quale passed on the film. Gerard Butler eventually returned to the film as Martin Campbell was chosen to direct. Common, Billy Bob Thornton, and Willem Dafoe were added to the cast, and Peter Craig provided uncredited rewrites.

On November 12, 2015, it was announced that a deal between producers of the film had been made, that Relativity, Neal H. Moritz, and Toby Jaffe's Original Film would now produce the film along with Millennium Films, which would also co-finance and distribute. On March 3, 2016, it was announced that Donovan Marsh would direct the film and Gerard Butler and Gary Oldman would star, with Original Film's Neal H. Moritz and Toby Jaffe producing the film along with Butler, Tooley Productions' Tucker Tooley, Alan Siegel, and Millennium's Mark Gill, John Thompson, Matt O'Toole and Les Weldon. On June 23, 2016, Taylor John Smith was cast in the film to play a sonar man on the sub. On July 6, 2016, Gabriel Chavarria joined the film to play a Navy SEAL aboard the U.S. submarine, next day, Zane Holtz also joined the film to play "Martinelli," a brave and skilled member of the elite unit. On July 13, 2016, Michael Trucco and Ryan McPartlin also came aboard to play a weapons specialist Devin Hall, and an ex-SEAL and CIA medic Matt Johnstone, respectively. On July 19, 2016, Michael Nyqvist was added to the cast to play Captain Sergei Andropov. On July 21, 2016, David Gyasi joined the film to play the Chief of the Boat of the submarine USS Omaha, with Toby Stephens cast to play Lt. Beaman, head of the black ops squad. On August 4, 2016, Linda Cardellini joined the cast.

Principal photography on the film began on July 25, 2016, in London, and in Bulgaria. Interior sets of a Virginia-class Hunter Killer submarine were built at Ealing Studios, using blueprints approved by the U.S. Navy, with the spaces expanded slightly to allow freer camera movement. The sets were mounted on a gimbal to simulate the movement of the sea. Ealing also hosted a Pentagon set from where U.S. military personnel track the submarine action. The Former Legal & General Building in Kingswood, Surrey, U.K. was also utilised as a part of The Pentagon.

Although the heroes of the movie are portrayed as U.S Navy SEALs the costuming department for the movie used commercially available uniforms in A-TACS FG camouflage which is not a pattern in use by the U.S Navy.

An exterior set of the main Hunter Killer submarine was built in Pinewood Studios’ 806,000-gallon exterior water tank, while underwater scenes were shot using a separate water tank at Warner Bros. Studios, Leavesden, also just outside London. Interiors of the Russian base were built as sets at Nu Boyana Film Studios in Bulgarian capital, Sofia.

== Release ==
The film was released in the United States on October 26, 2018, by Lionsgate through the Summit Premiere label. It was released in several territories, including the United Kingdom, the week before on October 19, 2018.

In Ukraine, the film was scheduled to premiere on October 25, but the Ukraine Ministry of Culture denied it an exhibition license based on a 2012 law on cinematography that banned "the distribution and screening of films, the goal of which is to popularise the bodies of an aggressor state and/or Soviet state security organs". According to a representative of the Ukrainian State Film Agency (Derzhkino), screening the film would be illegal because it contains a "positive image of the Russian president and admiral of the Russian army". Ukrainian-Russian relations have deteriorated since the 2014 Russian annexation of Crimea.

In Russia, the film was scheduled to premiere on November 1, but the film failed to obtain an exhibition license from the culture ministry. The ministry stated that the copy of the movie submitted by the distributor for review was of poor quality and the replacement was submitted too late for the ministry to review it in time.

=== Home media ===
Hunter Killer was released on digital on January 15, 2019, and on Ultra HD Blu-ray, Blu-ray and DVD on January 29, 2019, by Lionsgate Home Entertainment.

== Reception ==
=== Box office ===
Hunter Killer grossed $15.8 million in the United States and Canada, and $15.9 million in other territories, for a total worldwide gross of $31.7 million.

In the United States and Canada, Hunter Killer was released alongside Indivisible and Johnny English Strikes Again, and was projected to gross $5–9 million from 2,720 theaters in its opening weekend. The film made $2.6 million on its first day, including $420,000 from Thursday night previews. It went on to debut to $6.7 million, finishing fifth at the box office and marking the worst debut for Butler since Playing for Keeps ($5.8 million) in 2012. The film made $3.5 million in its second weekend, falling to ninth.

=== Critical response ===
On Rotten Tomatoes, the film has an approval rating of 38% based on 115 reviews, with an average score of 4.7/10. The website's critical consensus reads, "Much like the submarine in its story, Hunter Killer cruises the murky action depths, following a perfunctory course into territory that's been charted many times before." On Metacritic, the film has a weighted average score of 43 out of 100, based on 28 critics, indicating "mixed or average" reviews. Audiences polled by CinemaScore gave the film an average grade of "A−" on an A+ to F scale, while PostTrak reported filmgoers gave it 4 out of 5 stars.

Bilge Ebiri of Vulture.com wrote:

Hunter Killer won't win any awards for originality, but it may win a couple for the brazenness with which it stacks clichés upon clichés. Basically, it's Crimson Tide meets Lone Survivor meets Under Siege meets a Russian variation on Olympus Has Fallen, with a bit of Geostorm thrown in. At least three of those movies are pretty good, so the overall math works in the film's favor.

Norman Wilner of Toronto's Now accused Marsh of ripping off John McTiernan's The Hunt For Red October and stated that "The constant agitation and bone-deep respect for all things military is straight out of Clancy’s playbook, but there’s no Jack Ryan figure to humanize it all."
