= USS Nautilus (SSN-571) =

First nuclear-powered submarine of the US Navy

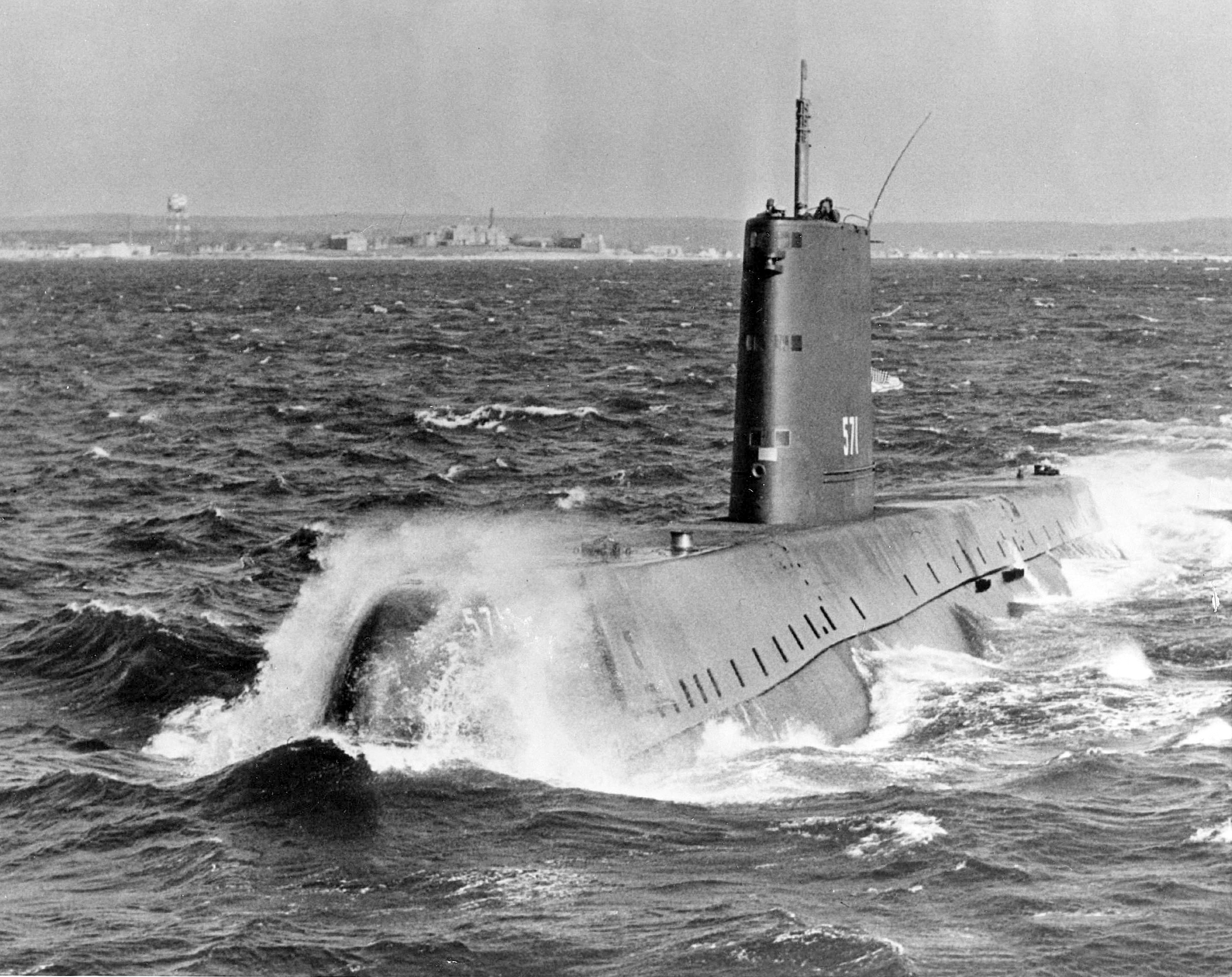
- USS Nautilus (SSN-571) on sea trials

Class overview
- Builders: General Dynamics Electric Boat
- Operators: United States Navy
- Preceded by: Tang class
- Succeeded by: USS Seawolf
- Built: 1952
- In commission: 1954–1980

History

United States
- Name: Nautilus
- Namesake: Jules Verne's "Nautilus" submarine
- Awarded: 2 August 1951
- Builder: General Dynamics Electric Boat
- Laid down: 14 June 1952
- Launched: 21 January 1954
- Sponsored by: Mamie Eisenhower (First Lady of the United States)
- Completed: 22 April 1955
- Commissioned: 30 September 1954
- Decommissioned: 3 March 1980
- Stricken: 3 March 1980
- Status: Museum ship

General characteristics
- Type: Nuclear submarine
- Displacement: 3,533 long tons (3,590 t) (surface); 4,092 long tons (4,158 t) (submerged)
- Length: 320 ft (97.5 m)
- Beam: 28 ft (8.5 m)
- Draft: 26 ft (7.9 m)
- Installed power: 13,400 hp (10,000 kW)
- Propulsion: STR nuclear reactor (later redesignated S2W), geared steam turbines, two shafts
- Speed: 23 kn (43 km/h; 26 mph)
- Complement: 13 officers, 92 enlisted
- Armament: 6 torpedo tubes
- U.S.S. Nautilus (Nuclear Submarine)
- U.S. National Register of Historic Places
- U.S. National Historic Landmark
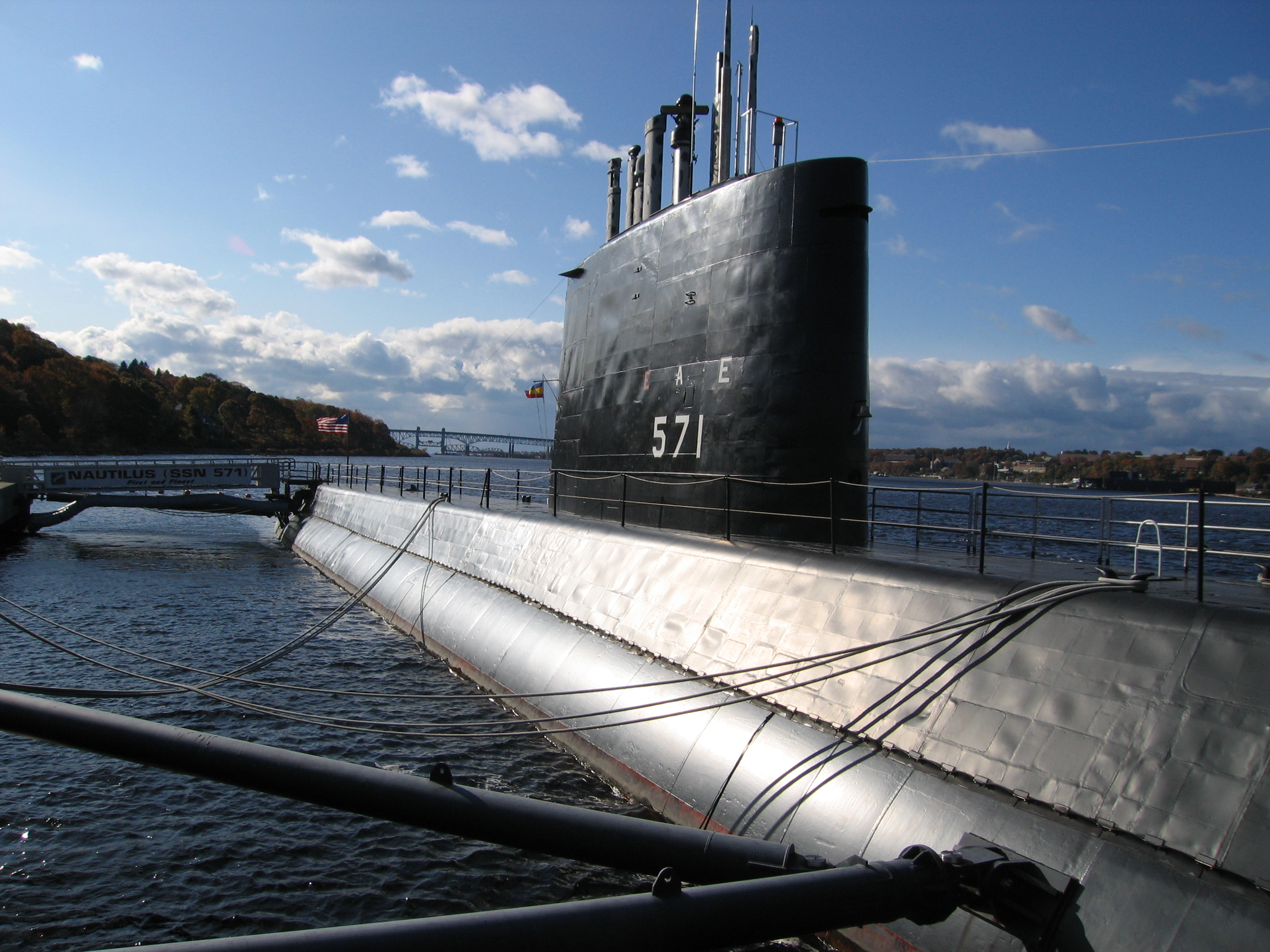
- USS Nautilus docked at the Submarine Force Library and Museum

- Location within Connecticut
- Location: Groton, Connecticut
- Built: 1952-1955, (commissioned 1954)
- Architect: General Dynamics Corporation
- NRHP reference No.: 79002653

Significant dates
- Added to NRHP: 16 May 1979
- Designated NHL: 20 May 1982

USS Nautilus (SSN-571) was the world's first nuclear-powered boat, nuclear-powered submarine, and submarine to complete a submerged transit of the North Pole on 3 August 1958. Her initial commanding officer was Eugene "Dennis" Wilkinson, a widely respected naval officer, who set the stage for many of the protocols of today's Nuclear Navy in the U.S. and who had a storied career during military service and afterwards.

Nautilus shares the name of the fictional submarine in Jules Verne's classic 1870 science-fiction novel Twenty Thousand Leagues Under the Seas and the USS Nautilus (SS-168) that served with distinction in World War II.

The USS Nautilus was authorized in 1951, construction began in 1952, and she was launched in January 1954, sponsored by Mamie Eisenhower, wife of President Dwight D. Eisenhower. She was commissioned the following September into the United States Navy (USN) and was delivered in 1955.

Her nuclear propulsion allowed her to remain submerged far longer than diesel-electric submarines, and she broke many records in her first years of operation and traveled to locations previously beyond the limits of submarines. In operation, she revealed a number of limitations in her design and construction, and this information was used to improve subsequent submarines.

Nautilus was decommissioned in 1980 and designated a National Historic Landmark in 1982. She has been preserved as a museum ship at the Submarine Force Library and Museum in Groton, Connecticut, where she receives around 250,000 visitors per year.

== Planning and construction ==
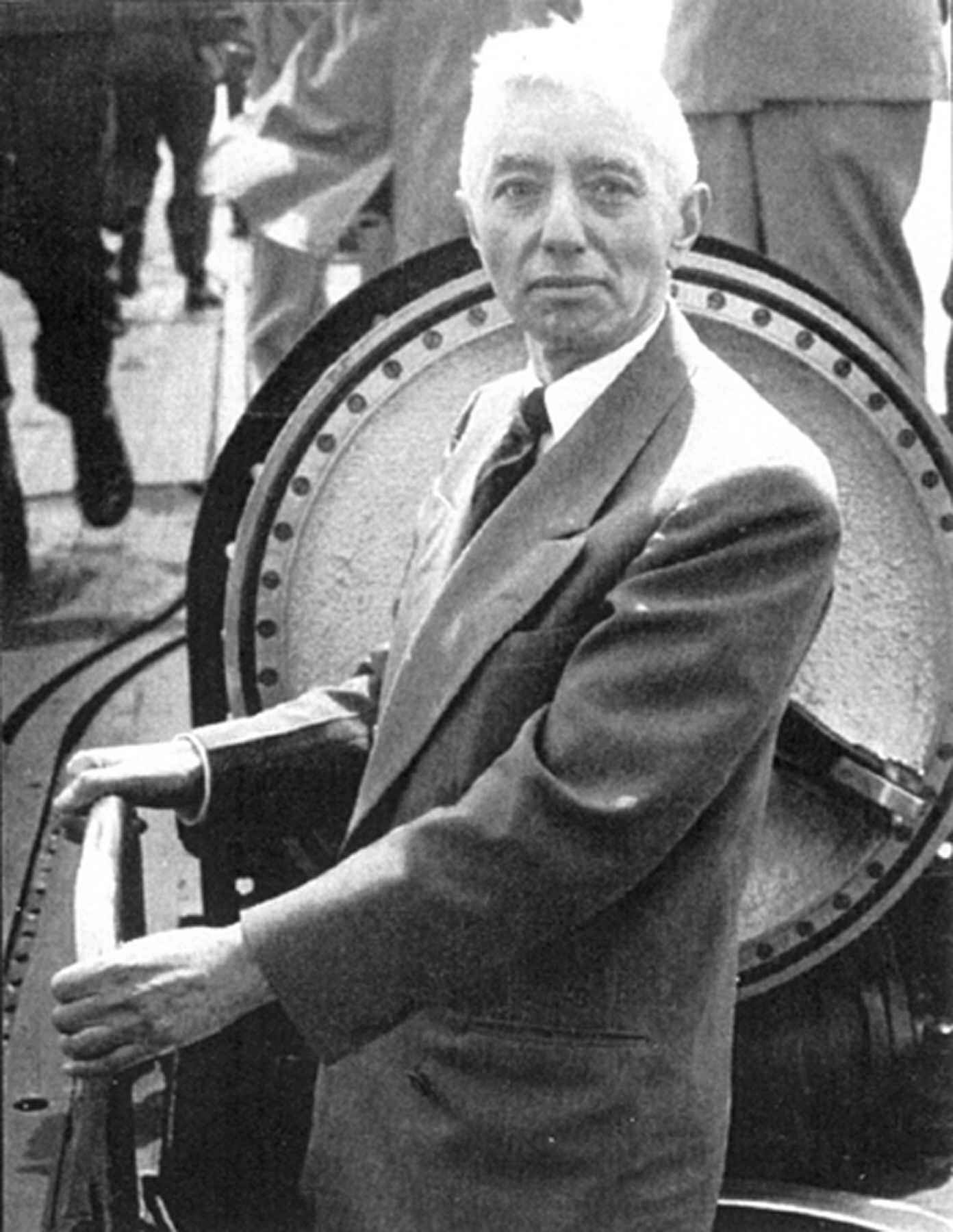
Admiral Hyman G. Rickover aboard the Nautilus

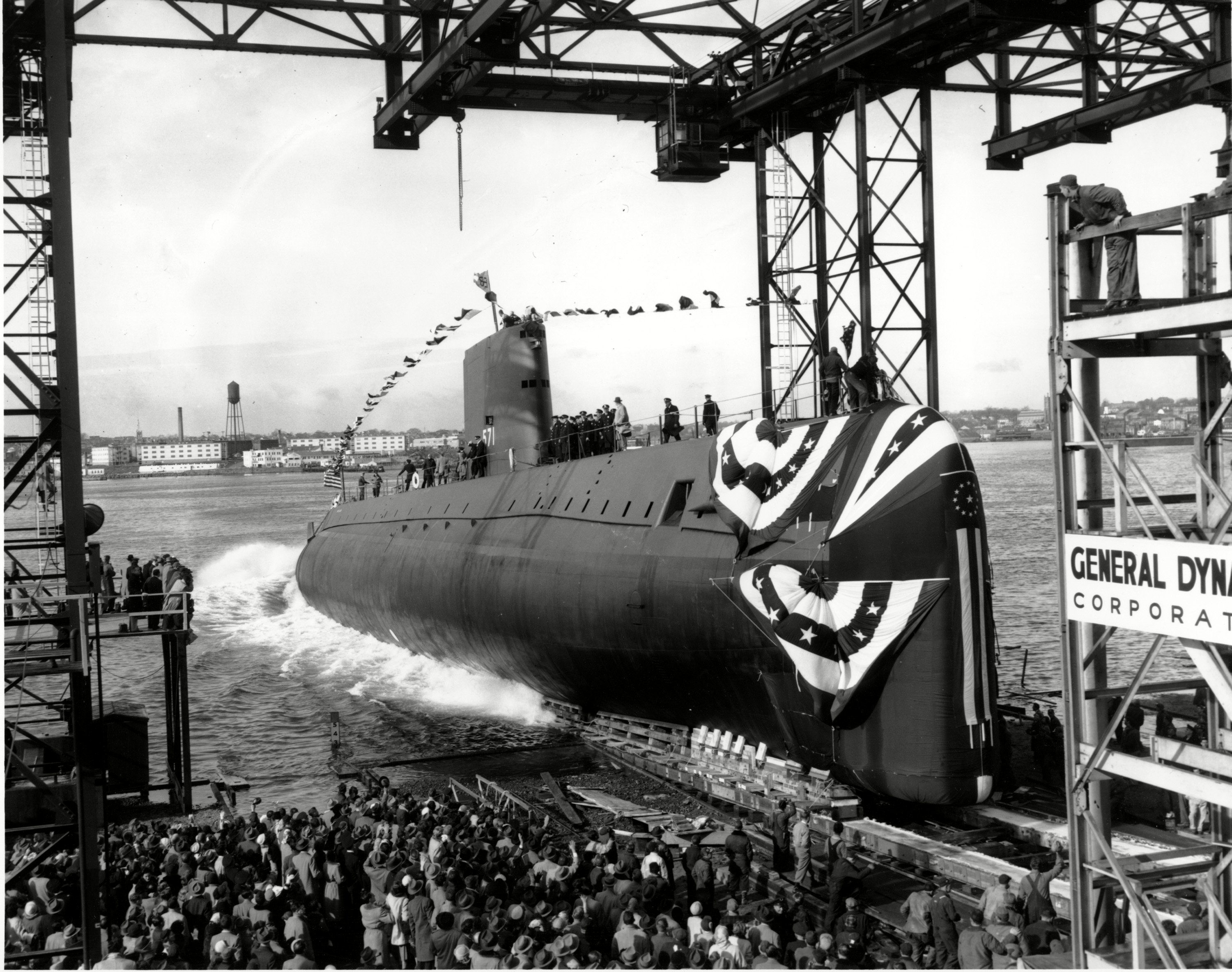
Launching Nautilus

The conceptual design of the first nuclear submarine began in March 1950 as project SCB 64. In July 1951, Congress authorized the construction of a nuclear-powered submarine for the USN, which was planned and personally supervised by Captain Hyman G. Rickover, known as the "Father of the Nuclear Navy". On 12 December 1951, the Department of the Navy announced that the submarine would be called Nautilus, the fourth USN vessel to bear the name. The boat carried the hull number SSN-571.

Designers drew inspiration from the advanced hydrodynamic hull design of the German Type XXI U-boat developed during World War II. This U-boat featured a streamlined shape, which enabled greater underwater speed and efficiency compared to earlier submarine designs that were primarily optimized for surface travel. Her revolutionary approach to underwater performance influenced postwar submarine development worldwide, including the USN's decision to focus on fully submerged operations.

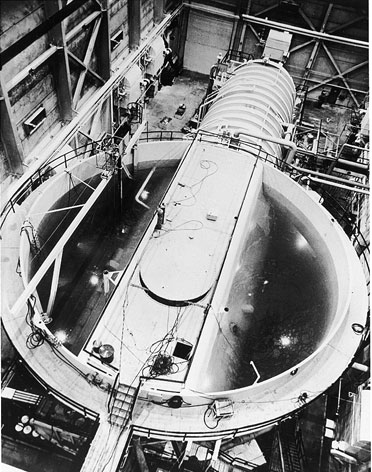
Nautilus's reactor core prototype at the S1W facility in Idaho

Nautilus's keel was laid at General Dynamics' Electric Boat Division in Groton, Connecticut, by Harry S. Truman on 14 June 1952. She was christened on 21 January 1954 and launched into the Thames River, sponsored by Mamie Eisenhower. Nautilus was commissioned on 30 September 1954 under the command of Commander Eugene P. Wilkinson.

Nautilus was powered by the Submarine Thermal Reactor, later designated the S2W reactor, a pressurized water reactor produced for the USN by Westinghouse Electric Corporation. Bettis Atomic Power Laboratory developed the basic reactor plant design used in Nautilus after being given the assignment on 31 December 1947 to design a nuclear power plant for a submarine. Nuclear power had a crucial advantage in submarine propulsion because it is a zero-emissions process that consumes no air. This design is the basis for nearly all of the US nuclear-powered submarines and surface combat ships and was adapted by other countries for naval nuclear propulsion. The first actual prototype for Nautilus was constructed and tested by the Argonne National Laboratory in 1953 at S1W at the Naval Reactors Facility, part of the National Reactor Testing Station in Idaho.

== "Underway on nuclear power" ==
Nautilus remained dockside after her commissioning for further construction and testing. At 11:00 am on 17 January 1955, the crew dropped the mooring lines and Wilkinson, on the bridge with Rickover, gave the command to back. When the boat was scarcely clear of the pier, the engineering officer in the maneuvering room reported to Wilkinson on the bridge that a loud noise was heard in the starboard reduction gear and that he had switched to electrical propulsion. Under normal circumstances, Wilkinson would have returned at once to the dock, but in full view of the press boats and other small craft attracted to the scene, Rickover was determined not to terminate the trial unless necessary. While the boat proceeded down the river on the port propeller alone, Panoff and the engineering officer inspected the noisy gear. A few minutes were needed to replace a loose locking pin on a retaining nut, and Wilkinson shifted back to steam propulsion. As the Nautilus slipped down the Thames into Long Island Sound, a signalman on the submarine blinked to the escort tug Skylark: "Underway on nuclear power." On 10 May, she headed south for her shakedown cruise. She traveled 1,100 nmi (2,000 km; 1,300 mi) from New London to San Juan, Puerto Rico, and covered 1,200 nmi (2,200 km; 1,400 mi) in less than 90 hours, submerged the entire way. This was the longest submerged cruise by a submarine at the time, and at the highest sustained speed ever recorded.

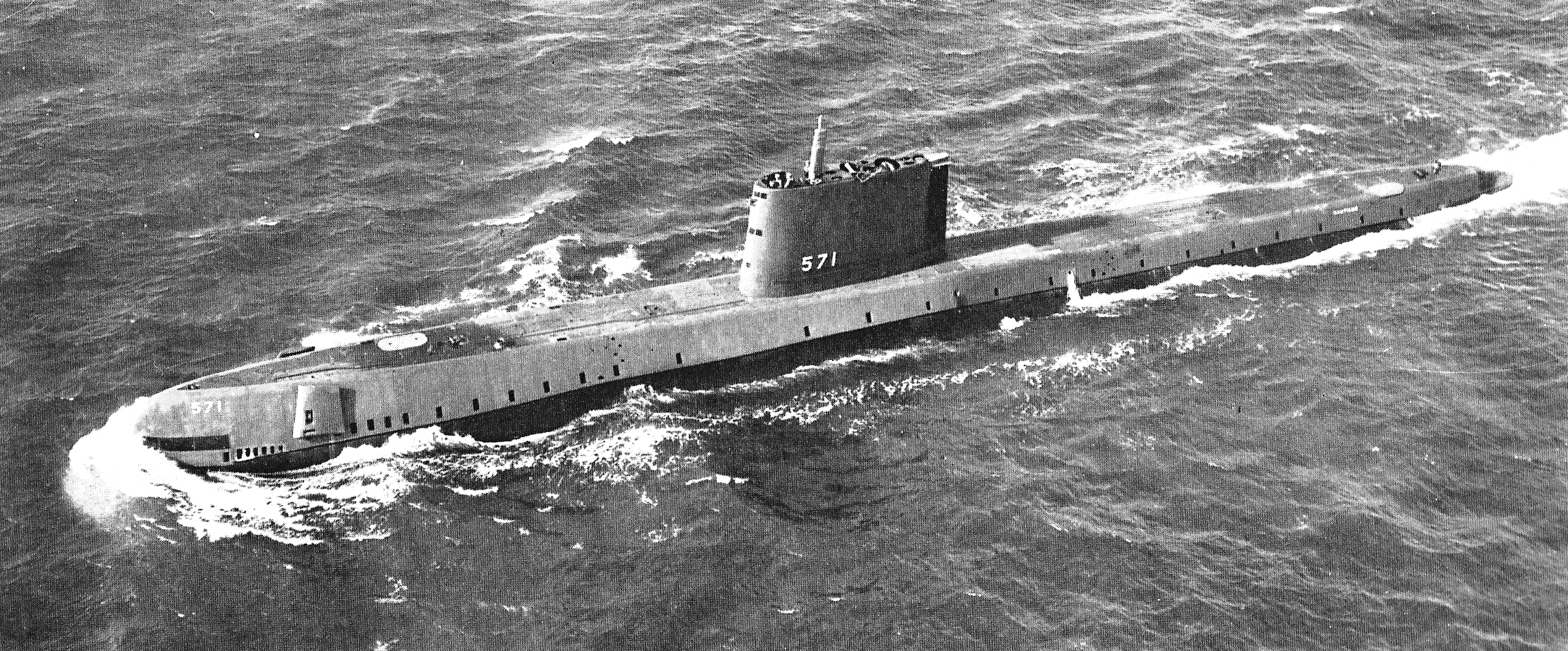
USS Nautilus during its initial sea trials, 20 January 1955

From 1955 to 1957, Nautilus continued to be used to investigate the effects of increased submerged speeds and endurance. These improvements rendered the progress made in antisubmarine warfare during World War II virtually obsolete. Radar and antisubmarine aircraft had proved crucial in defeating submarines during the war, but they proved ineffective against a vessel able to move quickly out of an area, change depth quickly, and stay submerged for very long periods.

On 4 February 1957, Nautilus logged her 60,000th nautical mile (110,000 km; 69,000 mi), matching the endurance of the fictional Nautilus described in Jules Verne's novel Twenty Thousand Leagues Under The Sea. In May, she departed for the Pacific Coast to participate in coastal exercises and the fleet exercise operation Home Run, which acquainted units of the Pacific Fleet with the capabilities of nuclear submarines.

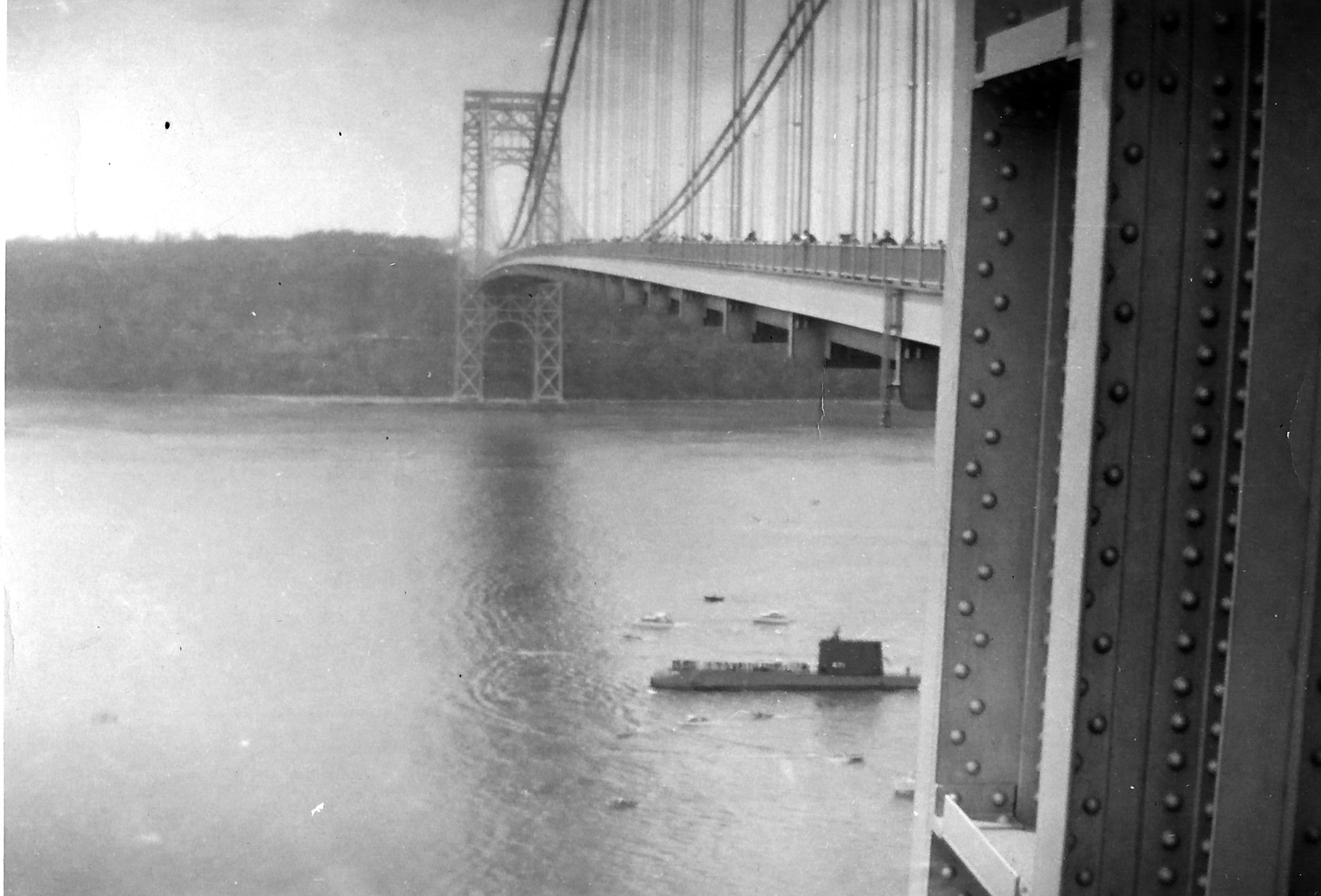
Nautilus passes under the George Washington Bridge during a visit to New York Harbor in 1956

Nautilus returned to New London on 21 July and departed again on 19 August for her first voyage of 1,200 nmi (2,200 km; 1,400 mi) under the polar pack ice. She then headed for the Eastern Atlantic to participate in NATO exercises and to conduct a tour of various British and French ports, where she was inspected by defense personnel of those countries. She arrived back at New London on 28 October, underwent upkeep, and then conducted coastal operations until the spring.

=== Operation Sunshine – under the North Pole ===
President Eisenhower ordered the USN to attempt a submarine transit of the North Pole as a technological showpiece following the Soviet Union's successful launch of Sputnik. On 25 April 1958, Nautilus was underway again for the West Coast under Commander William R. Anderson. She stopped at San Diego, San Francisco, and Seattle, then began her history-making polar transit under "Operation Sunshine", leaving Seattle on 9 June. On 19 June, she entered the Chukchi Sea, but was turned back by deep drift ice in those shallow waters. On 28 June, she arrived at Pearl Harbor to await better ice conditions.

By 23 July, she set a course northward. She submerged in the Barrow Sea Valley on 1 August and became the first watercraft to reach the geographic North Pole on 3 August at 23:15 EDT. The ability to navigate at extreme latitudes without surfacing was enabled by the technology of the North American Aviation N6A-1 Inertial Navigation System, a naval modification of the N6A used in the Navaho cruise missile; it had been installed on Nautilus and Skate after initial sea trials on USS Compass Island in 1957. She continued on from the North Pole and surfaced northeast of Greenland after 96 hours and 1,590 nmi (2,940 km; 1,830 mi) under the ice, having completed the first successful submerged voyage around the North Pole. The technical details of this mission were planned by scientists from the Naval Electronics Laboratory, including Dr. Waldo Lyon who accompanied Nautilus as chief scientist and ice pilot.

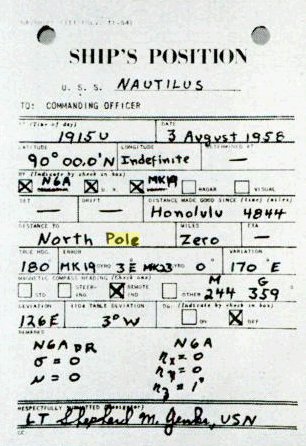
Navigator's report: Nautilus, 90°N, 19:15U, 3 August 1958, zero to North Pole

Navigation was difficult beneath the arctic ice sheet. Both magnetic compasses and normal gyrocompasses become inaccurate above 85°N. A special gyrocompass built by Sperry Rand was installed shortly before the journey. A risk existed that the submarine would become disoriented beneath the ice and that the crew would have to play "longitude roulette". Commander Anderson had considered using torpedoes to blow a hole in the ice if the submarine needed to surface.

The most difficult part of the journey was in the Bering Strait. The ice extended as much as 60 ft (18 m) below sea level. During the initial attempt to go through the Bering Strait, insufficient room was available between the ice and the sea bottom. During the second attempt, the submarine passed through a known channel close to Alaska.

During the address announcing the journey, the President mentioned that one day, nuclear cargo submarines might use that route for trade.

As Nautilus proceeded south from Greenland, a helicopter airlifted Commander Anderson to connect with transport to Washington, DC. At a White House ceremony on 8 August, President Eisenhower presented him with the Legion of Merit and announced that the crew had earned a Presidential Unit Citation.

Her next port of call was the Isle of Portland, England, where she received the Unit Citation from American Ambassador J.H. Whitney, the first ever issued in peacetime. She then crossed the Atlantic reaching New London, Connecticut, on 29 October. For the remainder of the year, Nautilus operated from her home port of New London.

=== Operational history ===
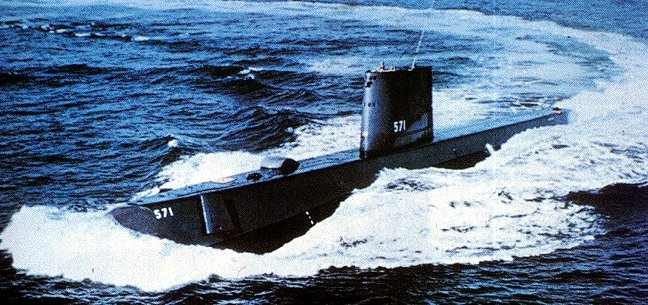
USS Nautilus, c. 1965

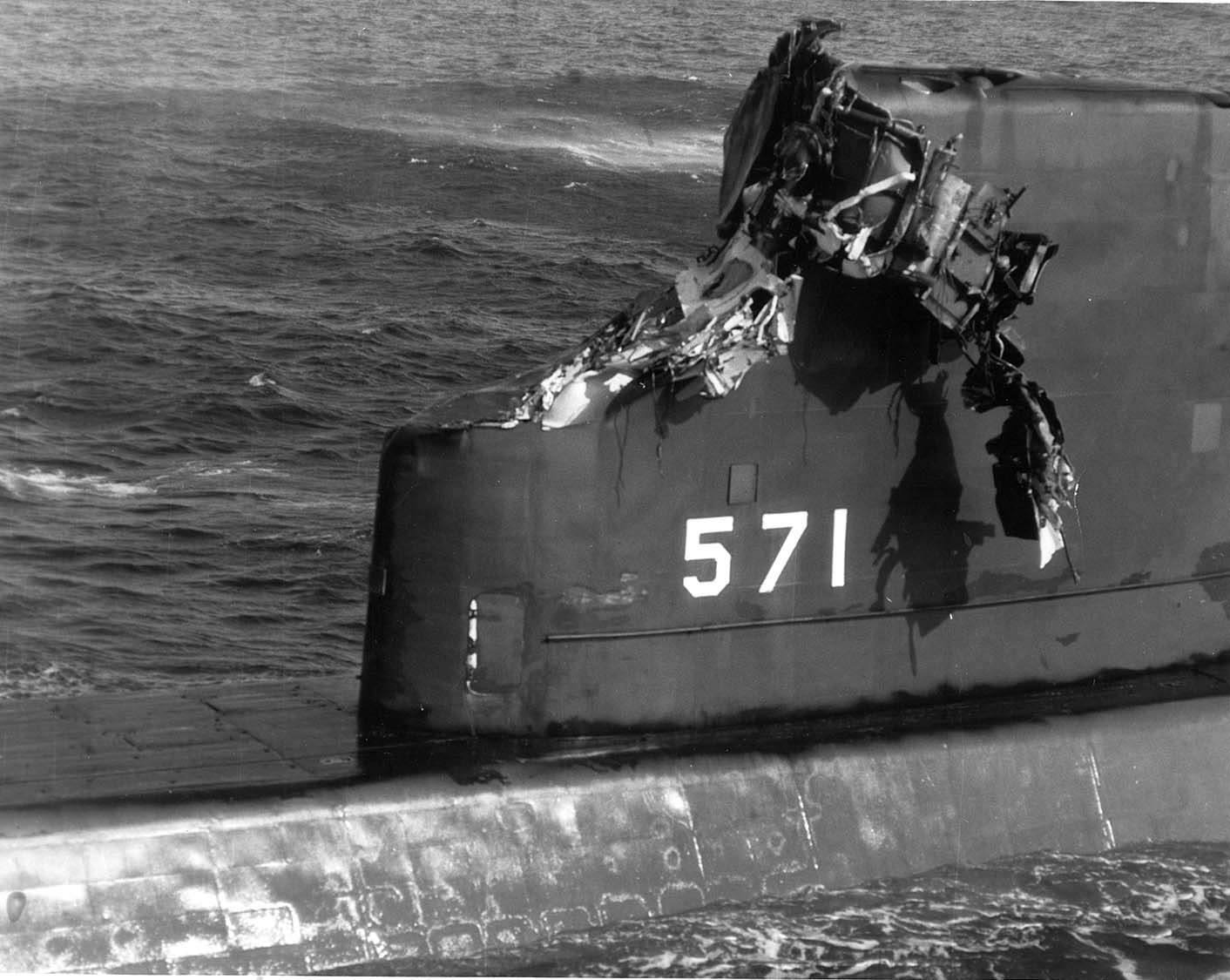
USS Nautilus after collision with Essex

USS Nautilus profile

Nautilus entered the Portsmouth Naval Shipyard in Kittery, Maine, for her first complete overhaul from 28 May 1959 to 15 August 1960. Overhaul was followed by refresher training. She departed New London on 24 October for her first deployment with the Sixth Fleet in the Mediterranean Sea, returning to her home-port on 16 December.

Nautilus spent most of her career assigned to Submarine Squadron 10 (SUBRON 10) at State Pier in New London. The other submarines in the squadron and she made their home tied up alongside submarine tender USS Fulton (AS-11), where they received preventive maintenance and repairs from the crew of machinists, millwrights, and other craftsmen.

Nautilus operated in the Atlantic, conducting evaluation tests for antisubmarine warfare improvements and participating in NATO exercises. During October 1962, she participated in the naval blockade of Cuba until she headed east again for a two-month Mediterranean tour in August 1963. On her return, she joined in fleet exercises until entering the Portsmouth Naval Shipyard for her second overhaul on 17 January 1964.

On 2 May 1966, Nautilus returned to her homeport to resume operations with the Atlantic Fleet, and she logged her 300,000th nautical mile (560,000 km; 350,000 mi) underway that month. She next conducted special operations for ComSubLant and then returned to Portsmouth in August 1967 for another year's stay. During an exercise in 1966, she collided with the aircraft carrier USS Essex on 10 November while at shallow depth. Following repairs in Portsmouth, she conducted exercises off the southeastern seaboard. She returned to New London in December 1968 and operated as a unit of SUBRON 10 for most of the remainder of her career.

On 9 April 1979, Nautilus set out from Groton on her final voyage under the command of Richard A. Riddell. She reached Mare Island Naval Shipyard of Vallejo, California, on 26 May 1979, her last day underway. She was decommissioned and stricken from the Naval Vessel Register on 3 March 1980.

=== Noise ===
Toward the end of her service, the hull and sail of Nautilus vibrated such that sonar became ineffective at more than 4 kn (7.4 km/h; 4.6 mph) speed, making the vessel vulnerable to sonar detection. Lessons learned from this problem were applied to later nuclear submarines.

== Awards and commendations ==
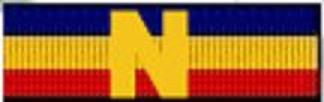
Presidential Unit Citation with Operation Sunshine clasp	National Defense; Service Medal

=== Presidential Unit Citation ===
For outstanding achievement in completing the first voyage in history across the top of the world, by cruising under the Arctic ice cap from the Bering Strait to the Greenland Sea.

During the period 22 July 1958 to 5 August 1958, USS Nautilus, the world's first nuclear powered ship, added to her list of historic achievements by crossing the Arctic Ocean from the Bering Sea to the Greenland Sea, passing submerged beneath the geographic North Pole. This voyage opens the possibility of a new commercial seaway, a Northwest Passage, between the major oceans of the world. Nuclear-powered cargo submarines may, in the future, use this route to the advantage of world trade.

The skill, professional competency and courage of the officers and crew of Nautilus were in keeping with the highest traditions of the Armed Forces of the United States and the pioneering spirit which has always characterized the country.

To commemorate the first submerged voyage under the North Pole, all Nautilus crewmembers who made the voyage may wear a Presidential Unit Citation ribbon with a special clasp in the form of a gold block letter N (image above).

== Museum ==
Nautilus was designated a National Historic Landmark by the United States Secretary of the Interior on 20 May 1982.

She was named as the official state ship (boat) of Connecticut in 1983. Nautilus was towed back to Groton after an extensive conversion at Mare Island Naval Shipyard under the command of Captain John Almon, arriving on 6 July 1985. On 11 April 1986, she opened to the public as part of the Submarine Force Library and Museum.

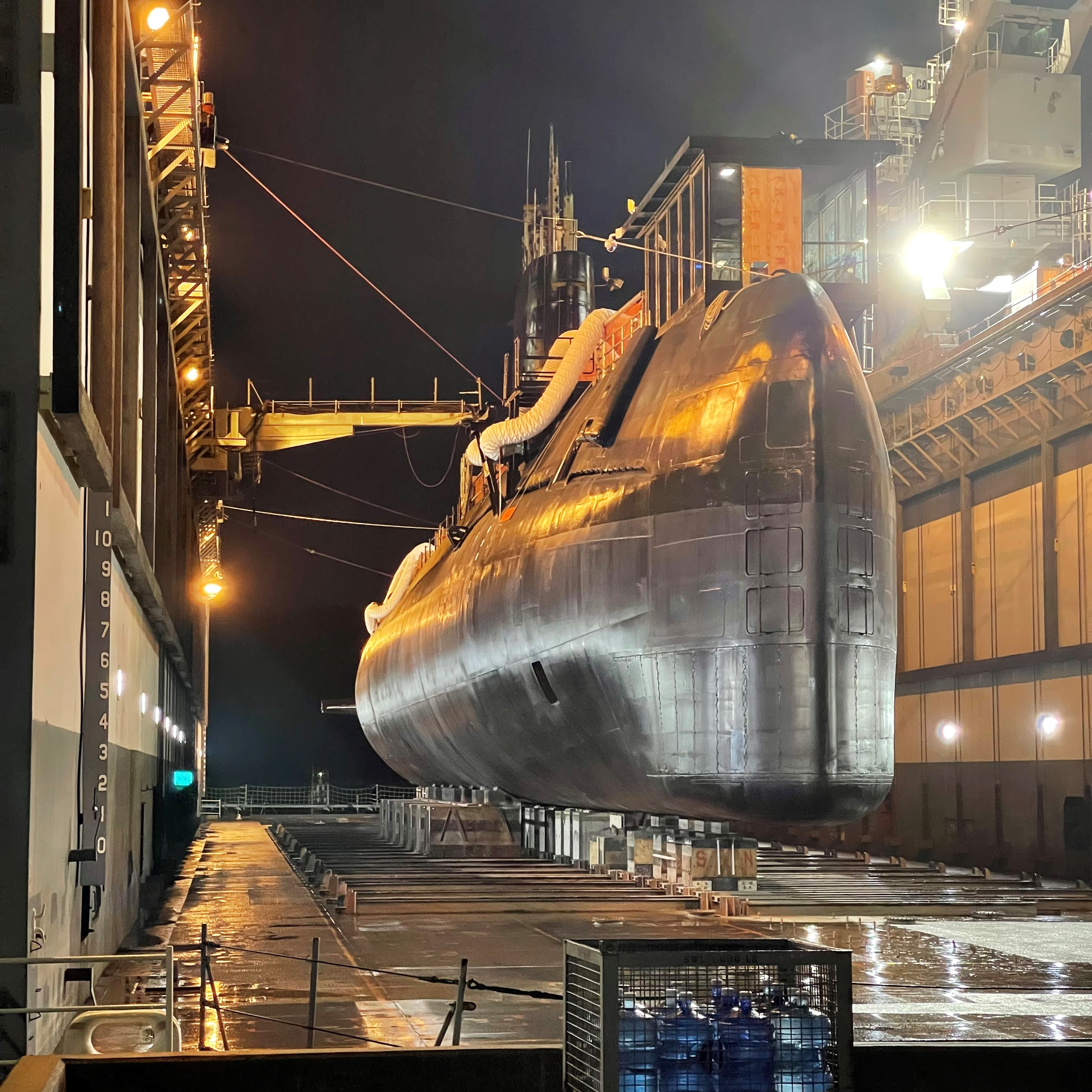
Nautilus in ARDM-4, 6 July 2022

Nautilus now serves as a museum of submarine history operated by the Naval History and Heritage Command. She underwent a five-month preservation in 2002 at Electric Boat at a cost around $4.7 million ($8.03 million in 2025). She attracts some 250,000 visitors annually to her berth near Naval Submarine Base New London. Visitors may tour the forward two compartments, with guidance from an automated system.

Nautilus celebrated the 50th anniversary of her commissioning on 30 September 2004 with a ceremony that included a speech from Vice Admiral Eugene P. Wilkinson, her first commanding officer, and a designation of the ship as an American Nuclear Society National Nuclear Landmark.

In March 2022, Nautilus began a restoration process that was expected to last 6 to 8 months, including blasting and painting of the hull, installation of new top decks, and upgraded interior lighting and electrical equipment. The restoration was completed at a cost of US$36 million.

== See also ==
- USS Skate (SSN-578) (first submarine to surface at the North Pole)
- National Register of Historic Places listings in New London County, Connecticut
- List of museum ships
- Merchant submarine
