= William Anderson (naval officer) =

American naval officer and politician

William Robert Anderson
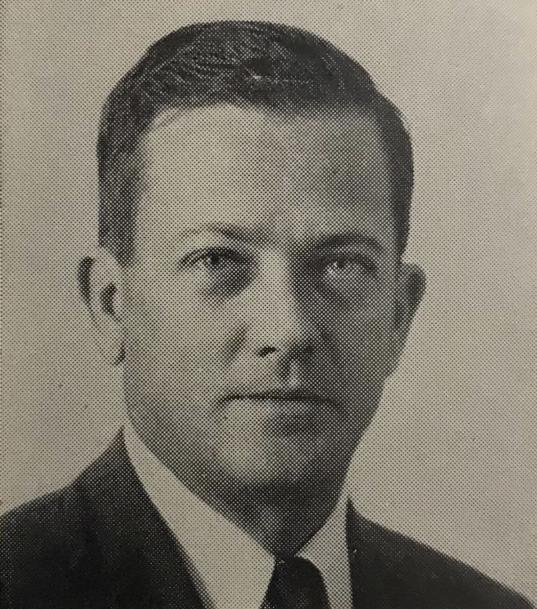

Member of the U.S. House of Representatives from Tennessee's 6th district
- In office January 3, 1965 – January 3, 1973
- Preceded by: Ross Bass
- Succeeded by: Robin Beard

Personal details
- Born: June 17, 1921 Bakerville, Tennessee, U.S.
- Died: February 25, 2007 (aged 85) Leesburg, Virginia, U.S.
- Resting place: Arlington National Cemetery
- Party: Democratic
- Spouse: Patricia Anderson
- Children: 4
- Education: Columbia Military Academy; United States Naval Academy
- Civilian awards: Founder's Medal

Military service
- Branch/service: United States Navy
- Years of service: 1942–1962
- Rank: Captain
- Commands: USS Nautilus
- Battles/wars: World War II; Operation Sunshine
- Military awards: Legion of Merit; Bronze Star Medal

William Robert Anderson (June 17, 1921 – February 25, 2007) was an officer in the United States Navy, and a U.S. Representative from Tennessee from 1965 to 1973.

== Early life and naval career ==
Anderson was born in Humphreys County, Tennessee in the rural community of Bakerville, south of Waverly. He attended primary school in Waynesboro, Tennessee where his father ran a sawmill. He graduated from the former Columbia Military Academy in Columbia, Tennessee in 1939, and from the United States Naval Academy in 1942.

Anderson's service in World War II was distinguished. He was awarded the Bronze Star Medal and participated in a total of eleven combat submarine patrols.

== USS Nautilus ==
Anderson was selected by Admiral Hyman G. Rickover to be the second commanding officer of the first nuclear submarine to be placed into service, the USS Nautilus and was its commander from 1957 to 1959. Anderson and his crew received international notice when the Nautilus became the first submarine to sail successfully under the polar ice cap surrounding the North Pole.

That transit was completed under direct orders of President Dwight Eisenhower, under extreme secrecy and was in direct response to the launch of the Sputnik satellite by the Russians. The president felt that such a display of technological and military capability would offset the advantage won by the Soviets with Sputnik. The voyage by Anderson and his crew led the way for other submarine exploration beneath the ice cap and gave a decided military advantage to the US. Anderson received the Legion of Merit from Eisenhower for leading his crew and ship on the historic mission.

After completing his tour as commander of the Nautilus, Anderson became an assistant to Admiral Rickover. He was promoted to the rank of captain at the relatively young age of 39 in 1960. He retired from the Navy shortly thereafter to pursue a career in politics.

== Author ==
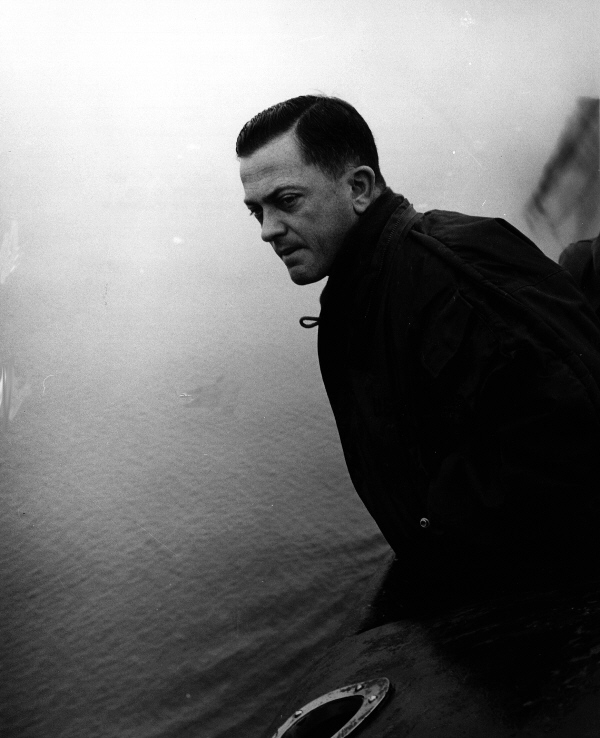
Anderson aboard the Nautilus

He wrote a 1959 book about his journey under the North Pole, Nautilus 90 North, co-written with Clay Blair Jr. An updated and more complete book about the North Pole transit, The Ice Diaries, with co-author Don Keith, was completed just before Anderson's death. The book features previously classified information and many details that were not available for the first book.

He was awarded, in 1959, the Founder's Medal of the Royal Geographical Society of London "for his services to Arctic exploration".

== Political career ==
Upon retiring from the Navy, Anderson entered politics. He mounted an independent campaign for governor of Tennessee in 1962, finishing second to former Democratic governor Frank G. Clement.

In 1964, Anderson entered the Democratic primary to replace Sixth District Representative Ross Bass, who was running for the United States Senate to finish the term of the late Estes Kefauver, and he won both the nomination and the subsequent general election. Anderson was re-elected three times.

Anderson proved to be somewhat more liberal than expected for a naval veteran representing a largely-rural district in western and central Tennessee. In fact, in the Tennessee congressional delegation of that time, only Richard Fulton of the neighboring 5th District (Nashville) had a more liberal voting record. Anderson voted in favor of the Voting Rights Act of 1965 and Civil Rights Act of 1968. After touring South Vietnam June 1970, Anderson and fellow Democratic Representative Augustus F. Hawkins drafted a House Resolution urging Congress to "condemn the cruel and inhumane treatment" of prisoners in South Vietnam. Anderson and Hawkins had visited South Vietnam with nine other representatives, but they were the only two to visit a civilian South Vietnamese prison on Con Son Island, which they described as being akin to "tiger cages". The two representatives also pressured President Nixon to send an independent task force to investigate the prison and "prevent further degradation and death".

Anderson was well regarded in some Democratic circles and was sometimes mentioned as potentially having a bright future, some even suggesting him as a potential vice presidential nominee in 1972 based largely upon his military record. However, Anderson's independent gubernatorial race and his progressive tendencies had not been forgotten by many of his fellow Democrats, particularly in the General Assembly. Tennessee was slated to lose a district as a result of reapportionment following the 1970 census, and Anderson's district was considerably reconfigured prior to the 1972 elections. Anderson's district received a large area around Memphis, where Republican influence was strong and growing and simultaneously lost some solidly Democratic areas.

Observers felt that if there was a vulnerable Democratic incumbent in the Tennessee congressional delegation in 1972, it was probably Anderson. That came to pass in the Republican landslide of 1972, in which President Nixon carried 49 of 50 states and 90 of Tennessee's 95 counties, and Anderson lost to Republican state personnel commissioner Robin Beard by 12 percent. Since then, the district, renumbered the Seventh District in 1983, has become the state's most Republican region outside of East Tennessee, and Democrats have made only three subsequent serious bids for the seat as of 2016.

Anderson retired from public life. He served as an officer with the Public Office Corporation, and lived in Alexandria, Virginia. He died from kidney failure after living in Leesburg, Virginia during the final years of his life.

After leaving office, Anderson had played a key role in automating the administrative procedures in the constituent offices of the House of Representatives. His son, William, was the classic "early adopter" of mini-computer technology, the DEC PDP-11/70 specifically, and the two of them helped establish a timesharing company that offered members of Congress an opportunity to improve constituent services. The firm's offerings not only improved efficiency but also allowed members to deal efficiently with the tsunami of "interest group" postcards, then flooding the Hill.

He was survived by his wife, Patricia, and his four children, Michael, William, Jane and Thomas Anderson, also known as "Mac".

== Awards ==
William Anderson received the following medals and decorations:

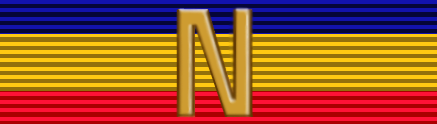

Submarine Warfare insignia
1st Row		Legion of Merit		
2nd Row	Bronze Star Medal	Navy and Marine Corps Commendation Medal	Presidential Unit Citation with "N" device	American Defense Service Medal with star
3rd Row	American Campaign Medal	Asiatic-Pacific Campaign Medal with nine battle stars	World War II Victory Medal	National Defense Service Medal with star
4th Row	Korean Service Medal	Korean Presidential Unit Citation	United Nations Service Medal	Philippine Liberation Medal with two stars
Submarine Combat Patrol insignia

U.S. House of Representatives
Preceded by Ross Bass	Member of the U.S. House of Representatives from Tennessee's 6th congressional district 1965–1973	Succeeded by Robin Beard
