= 1982 United States Senate election in Tennessee =

- November 2, 1982
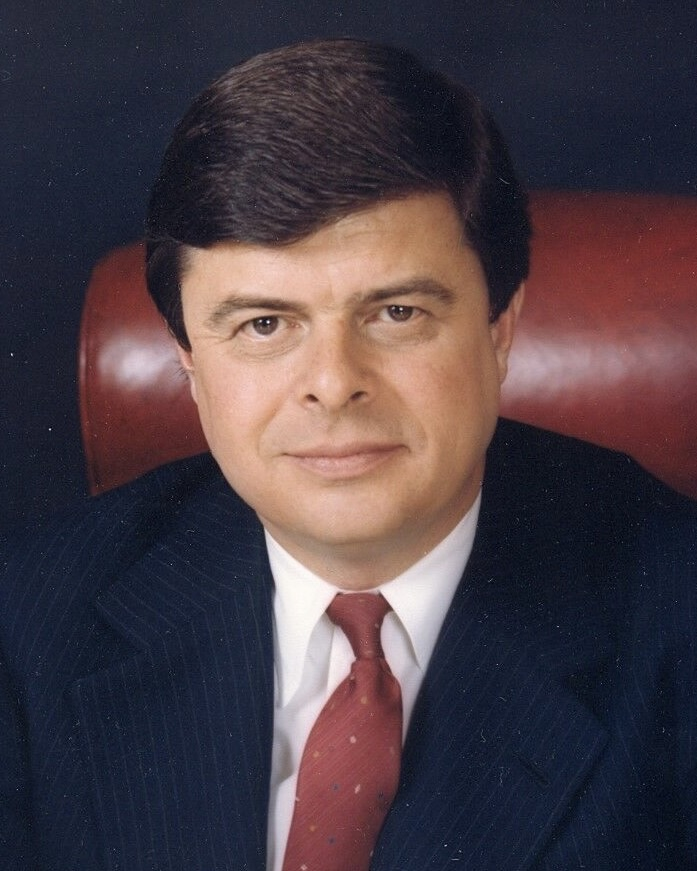

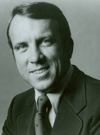
Nominee	Jim Sasser	Robin Beard
Party	Democratic	Republican
Popular vote	780,113	479,642
Percentage	61.93%	38.07%
- County results Sasser: 50–60% 60–70% 70–80% 80–90% Beard: 50–60%
U.S. senator before election
Jim Sasser
Democratic
Elected U.S. Senator
Jim Sasser
Democratic

The 1982 United States Senate election in Tennessee was held on November 2, 1982, concurrently with other elections to the United States Senate in other states as well as elections to the United States House of Representatives and various state and local elections. Incumbent Democratic U.S. Senator Jim Sasser won re-election. Sasser defeated Republican Robin Beard.

Sasser received 92% of the black vote.

== Democratic primary ==
=== Candidates ===
- Jim Sasser, incumbent U.S. Senator
- Charles Gordon Vick, perennial candidate

=== Results ===
Democratic Party primary results
Party	Candidate	Votes	%
Democratic	Jim Sasser (incumbent)	511,059	88.95%
Democratic	Charles Gordon Vick	63,488	11.05%

== Republican primary ==
=== Candidates ===
- Robin Beard, U.S. Representative
- William Bryce Thompson, Jr.

=== Results ===
Republican Party primary results
Party	Candidate	Votes	%
Republican	Robin Beard	205,271	91.41%
Republican	William Bryce Thompson, Jr.	19,277	8.59%

== Results ==
General election results
Party	Candidate	Votes	%
Democratic	Jim Sasser (incumbent)	780,113	61.93%
Republican	Robin Beard	479,642	38.07%
Total votes			100.00%
Democratic hold			

== See also ==
- 1982 United States Senate elections

== Works cited ==
- Black, Earl; Black, Merle (1992). The Vital South: How Presidents Are Elected. Harvard University Press. ISBN 0674941306.
