= Street Kings =

2008 action thriller film directed by David Ayer

- Theatrical release poster
- Directed by: David Ayer
- Screenplay by: James Ellroy; Kurt Wimmer; Jamie Moss
- Story by: James Ellroy
- Produced by: Lucas Foster; Alexandra Milchan; Erwin Stoff
- Starring: Keanu Reeves; Forest Whitaker; Hugh Laurie; Chris Evans; Common; The Game
- Cinematography: Gabriel Beristain
- Edited by: Jeffrey Ford
- Music by: Graeme Revell
- Production companies: 3 Arts Entertainment; Regency Enterprises
- Distributed by: Fox Searchlight Pictures
- Release dates: April 3, 2008 (Hollywood); April 11, 2008 (United States)
- Running time: 109 minutes
- Country: United States
- Language: English
- Budget: $20 million
- Box office: $66.5 million

Street Kings is a 2008 American crime action thriller film directed by David Ayer from a screen play by James Ellroy, Kurt Wimmer and Jamie Moss. It stars Keanu Reeves, Forest Whitaker, Hugh Laurie, Chris Evans, Common and The Game. The film follows a troubled undercover police detective (Reeves) who is implicated in the murder of another officer.

The film was released in theaters on April 11, 2008. It received mixed-to-negative reviews, but was a commercial success. It was followed by a direct-to-video stand-alone sequel, Street Kings 2: Motor City, in 2011.

== Plot ==
Thomas "Tom" Ludlow, an alcoholic undercover detective for the LAPD's Vice-Special unit, arranges an arms deal with Korean gangsters suspected of kidnapping two teenage girls. He provokes the gangsters into beating him and stealing his car, allowing him to track them to the gang's hideout. Ludlow storms the hideout and kills the gangsters, staging the scene to make the shootings appear justified, and rescues the captive girls.

While Captain Jack Wander and the rest of his unit congratulate him, Ludlow is confronted by his former partner, Terrence Washington, who disapproves of the unit's corrupt tactics. Ludlow is later approached by Captain James Biggs of Internal Affairs. Wander warns that Washington has reported Ludlow to Biggs.

Ludlow follows Washington to a convenience store, where they are ambushed by two gunmen under the pretense of a robbery. Accidentally shot when Ludlow returns fire, Washington is killed by the gunmen. The clerk is killed as well. Wander advises Ludlow to remove the surveillance footage, telling the press Ludlow was first on the scene but too late to save Washington. Temporarily reassigned to fielding civilian complaints, Ludlow enlists the cooperation of investigator Paul Diskant, determined to find the killers himself. Washington is implicated in stealing drugs from the evidence room and selling them to the gunmen, identified as criminals Fremont and Coates.

Joined by a reluctant Diskant, Ludlow brutalizes informants until local drug dealer Scribble leads them to the bodies of the real Fremont and Coates in a shallow grave, killed long before Washington. Giving the surveillance footage to Washington's widow, Linda, Ludlow reveals that he lost his own wife recently and vows to avenge Washington.

Ludlow and Diskant pose as dirty cops, forcing Scribble to arrange a meeting with the killers masquerading as Fremont and Coates. Diskant recognizes them, but he and Scribble are killed in the ensuing gunfight. Ludlow kills both assailants, but sees on the news that they were Los Angeles County Sheriff's Department deputies.

Declared a "cop killer", Ludlow is arrested by fellow detectives Santos and Demille, who admit to killing the real Fremont and Coates and planting evidence to frame them for Washington's murder. He realizes that Washington was actually informing on Wander, who is the one behind the evidence room theft. Before Santos and Demille can execute him, Ludlow manages to break free and kill both of them. He saves Linda from Sergeant Mike Clady, sent by Wander to recover the surveillance footage and kill her, subduing him and locking him in his trunk.

Ludlow confronts Wander at home, handcuffing him after a brawl. Wander confesses that he has incriminating evidence against high-ranking officials to use to become LAPD chief and, eventually, mayor. Revealing a stash of ill-gotten money and blackmail documents hidden inside his walls, Wander declares his actions were for the sake of Ludlow and their unit, but Ludlow shoots him dead. Biggs arrives, admitting he used Ludlow to bring down Wander on behalf of those in power, and tells him that the department still needs him.

== Cast ==
- Keanu Reeves as Detective Thomas "Tom" Ludlow
- Forest Whitaker as Captain Jack Wander
- Hugh Laurie as Captain Jimmy Biggs
- Chris Evans as Detective Paul "Disco" Diskant
- Cedric the Entertainer as Winston "Scribble"
- Jay Mohr as Sergeant Mike Clady
- Terry Crews as Detective Terrence Washington
- Naomie Harris as Linda Washington
- Common as Fake Coates
- The Game as "Grill"
- Martha Higareda as Grace Garcia
- John Corbett as Detective Dante Demille
- Amaury Nolasco as Detective Cosmo Santos
- Cle Shaheed Sloan as Fake Fremont
- Noel G. as "Quicks"
- Clifton Powell as Sergeant Green
- Daryl F. Gates as The Chief
- Kenneth Choi as Boss Kim

== Production ==
In 1997, David Fincher had entered negotiations to direct the film, under its original title The Night Watchman, from a screenplay by James Ellroy for New Regency and Warner Bros.

In 2004, it was announced that Spike Lee would be directing the film for a 2005 release. In 2005, it was announced that Oliver Stone was in talks to direct the film. However, Stone later denied this. Training Day screenwriter David Ayer took over the project.

On February 5, 2008, it was announced that Fox Searchlight Pictures changed the film's title from The Night Watchman to Street Kings.

== Reception ==
=== Critical response ===
On Rotten Tomatoes 37% of 150 reviews of the film are positive with average rating of 5.11/10. The site's consensus reads, "Street Kings contains formulaic violence but no shred of intelligence." On Metacritic, the film has a score of 55 out of 100 based on 28 critics, indicating "mixed or average reviews".

=== Box office ===
In its opening weekend, the film grossed $12.5 million from 2,467 theaters, finishing second at the box office. It went on to gross $26.4 million domestically and $39.2 million internationally for a total of $65.6 million.

== Home media ==
The DVD was released on August 19, 2008, as a single-disc offering with director commentary, and 2-disc special-edition set with numerous documentaries, interviews and a digital copy of the film. It is also available on Blu-ray disc with all the special features of the 2-disc DVD version. By January 2009, the film had made $14.6 million from DVD sales.

== Sequel ==
The film is followed by a sequel, Street Kings 2: Motor City, released direct-to-video in 2011. Other than both featuring Clifton Powell (playing different roles), the films are unrelated.
