= WNSP =

- Bay Minette, Alabama; United States
- Broadcast area: Mobile, Alabama
- Frequency: 105.5 MHz
- Branding: Sports Radio 105.5

Programming
- Format: Sports
- Affiliations: ABC; Infinity Sports Network (selected programing); Crimson Tide Sports Network; New Orleans Saints Radio Network

Ownership
- Owner: Dot Com Plus, LLC
- Sister stations: WZEW

History
- First air date: October 1, 1964 (as WBCA-FM)
- Former call signs: WBCA-FM (1964–1967); WWSM (1967–1989); WMMV (1989–1992); WYMZ (3/92-10/92); WNWT (1992–1993)

Technical information
- Licensing authority: FCC
- Facility ID: 21227
- Class: A
- ERP: 5,300 watts
- HAAT: 106 meters (348 feet)
- Transmitter coordinates: 30°49′34″N 87°51′52″W

Links
- Public license information: Public file; LMS
- Webcast: Listen Live
- Website: wnsp.com

WNSP (105.5 FM, "Sports Radio 105.5") is a radio station licensed to serve Bay Minette, Alabama, United States. The station, founded in 1964, is currently owned by Dot Com Plus, LLC. WNSP and sister station WZEW broadcast from the former Smith Bakery building in Mobile, Alabama. WNSP is in the midst of a move out of historic Midtown, to a newly renovated building located along the I-65 corridor. WNSP's transmitter is near Bay Minette.

== Programming ==
Since September 11, 1993, WNSP has broadcast a sports talk format to the greater Mobile metropolitan area. In addition to its daily lineup of local programs covering the Southeastern Conference, golf, hunting, fishing, NASCAR, and other regional sports, the station features select programming from Infinity Sports Network. WNSP was the original flagship station of the University of South Alabama radio network. The station is the Mobile affiliate of the New Orleans Saints radio network and previously the Auburn Tigers football and Auburn Tigers basketball radio networks. Beginning with the 2009 college football season, WNSP became the flagship for the University of South Alabama Jaguars football program. The longtime partnership between WNSP and South Alabama ended in April of 2016. With South Alabama moving all athletics programming to a partnership with iHeart Radio and local competitor Sports Talk 99.5 FM WRKH-HD2.

The current local programming from the station includes:

The Opening Kickoff: Monday-Friday - 6am-9am. Hosted By Mark Heim and Lee Shirvanian. Produced by Michael Brauner.

SportsDrive: Monday-Friday - 3pm-6pm Hosted by Andrew Spivey and Taylor Tanner.

John Racciatti's Miller Lite Golf Show - Monday 6pm-7pm - with local golf pros including Danny Spybey. Michael Brauner and Taylor Tanner are also show regulars alongside long time host John Racciatti.

Tommy Praytor's Inside Alabama Racing - Wednesdays - 6pm-7pm Produced by Taylor Tanner

WNSP Outdoors - Thursday 12noon-1pm with Alan White and Doug Max. Produced by Michael Brauner

During High School Football season the station airs Live coverage of games and scores until midnight each Friday night.

Notable regular guests across the station include South Alabama Basketball Head Coach Richie Riley, Assistant GM of the Washington Nationals Dan Jennings, South Alabama Baseball Head Coach Mark Calvi, Alabama play-by-play commentator Chris Stewart, Jake Crain of The Daily Wire, former San Diego Chargers Quarterback and NC State Head Coach Philip Rivers and former Alabama Crimson Tide football center and The Biggest Loser contestant Roger Shultz.

== History ==
This station began regular broadcast operations on October 1, 1964, as WBCA-FM. Broadcasting with 3,000 watts of effective radiated power, the Faulkner Radio, Inc.-owned station was the FM sister station to WBCA (1110 AM). As with the AM station, the WBCA callsign was said to stand for "Wonderful Baldwin County Alabama". James H. Faulkner, owner of Faulkner Radio, also owned The Baldwin Times newspaper and had served as the mayor of Bay Minette from 1941 to 1943.

In 1967, the station raised its antenna to 104 meters (340 feet), lowered its effective radiated power to 2,300 watts, and changed its call letters to WWSM. Programmed separately from its country music formatted AM sister station since its launch in 1964, WWSM played a soul music format for most of the 1970s. However, by 1979, the station had adopted a Top 40 format and was simulcasting as much as 60% of the AM station's programming.

In August 1985, the Faulkner family agreed to transfer control of licensee Faulkner Radio Inc. to Faulkner University. The deal was approved by the FCC on October 3, 1985, and the transaction was consummated on January 10, 1986. In March 1986, Faulkner Radio Inc. agreed to formally transfer the broadcast license for WWSM to Faulkner University. This transfer was approved by the FCC on April 2, 1986, and the transaction was consummated on August 4, 1986.

In March 1987, Faulkner University reached an agreement to transfer the WWSM license to a new company called Faulkner-Phillips Media Inc. The deal was approved by the FCC on April 15, 1987, and the transaction was consummated on May 22, 1987. In 1987, the station acquired the intellectual property from Mobile's 96.1 FM. Consequently, the station's call sign was changed to WLPR and the format was changed to beautiful music. The station was assigned the WMMV call letters by the Federal Communications Commission on September 1, 1989. The station was assigned new call letters WYMZ on March 9, 1992, but this was a short-term change as the station made another application to the FCC and was granted WNWT on October 12, 1992. These too would prove short-lived as the station was assigned the current WNSP callsign less than a year later on August 31, 1993.

The new callsign was chosen to accompany a new sports talk format which launched on September 11, 1993. WNSP claims to be the first sports talk station in the United States to operate on the FM band. Operation of the station was taken over by Capitol Broadcasting in 1995 as part of a local marketing agreement. Capitol Broadcasting was bought out and absorbed by Clear Channel Communications in mid-1997. With Clear Channel unwilling to continue the LMA, WNSP's owners reached an agreement in May 1998 to sell this station to Dot Com Plus, Inc. The deal was approved by the FCC on July 6, 1998, and the transaction was consummated on July 9, 1998.

== Personalities ==
- Lee Shirvanian - The Opening Kickoff - Shirvanian, a native of Upper Saddle River, New Jersey has been with the station since the switch to “All-Sports All the Time” in 1993. Longtime lead host of the Morning Sportscenter which rebranded in the late 2010s as “The Opening Kickoff”. He is a member of the University of South Alabama Hall of Fame as well as the Mobile Sports Hall of Fame for his many years as the play by play voice of the hometown South Alabama Jaguars.
- Mark Heim - The Opening Kickoff - Heim a native of New Orleans, Louisiana hosts The Opening Kickoff with Lee Shirvanian.
- Taylor Tanner - SportsDrive - Tanner is the co-host of the reboot of the station's afternoon brand, SportsDrive. Tanner joined the station in 2026.
- Andrew Spivey - SportsDrive - Spivey is the host of SportsDrive. Spivey joined the station in 2026.
- Tommy Praytor - Inside Alabama Racing - Praytor is the father of former ARCA Menard's Series Driver, Thomas Praytor. He is also a real estate agent. Praytor joined the station in 1999.
- Tim Taylor - “Pigskin Pete” - Host of the Prep Spotlight, The Friday Night Scoreboard, and the High School Pregame Show. Taylor has donated his time to high school sports coverage for over 25 years at the station.
- Michael Brauner - “Brauner” - A native of New Jersey and a graduate of the University of Alabama.
- Michael Brauner serves as the producer and an On Air Personality for The Opening Kickoff. He also is a regular in the rotation for the Miller Lite Golf Show on the Station.
- John Racciatti - Miller Lite Golf Show

Notable former on-air personalities include Mobile Press-Register sports reporter Neal McCready. McCready said he lost his job co-hosting the weekday "Afternoon Sports Drive" show in part due to complaints by advertisers over his negative coverage of University of Alabama football and current Tennessee Titans play-by-play announcer Taylor Zarzour.
