= Don Keith =

American writer (born 1947)

- Born: 12 December 1947 (age 78); Springville
- Education: University of Alabama, Springville High School
- Occupations: Writer (1995–), screenwriter, filmmaker, freelance writer, radio personality (1970–1979), radio producer, radio personality (1979–1983), programmer (1990–2002), vice president (2002–2012)
- Website: www.donkeith.com

Don Keith (born December 12, 1947, in Springville, Alabama) is an American writer, best known for his books series Hunter Killer (2003–2023) co-authored with George Wallace, of which the novel Firing Point (2011) was adapted into the film Hunter Killer (2018). He has also authored several biographies, young adult novels, and military history books.

== Biography ==
Keith was born on December 12, 1947, in Springville, Alabama. In 1970, he was a graduate of the University of Alabama with a degree in Broadcast and Film.

He has been an amateur radio operator since 1969 and he co-owned with Sherri Brice the radio station WZEW in Mobile, Alabama from 1983 to 1986.

Keith's first novel, The Forever Season (1995), received the Fiction of the Year award from the Alabama Library Association.

He and his wife, Charlene, live in Indian Springs Village, Alabama.

== Works ==
=== Novels ===
Hunter Killer series (with George Wallace):

1. Final Bearing (2003), ISBN 9780765304155
2. Dangerous Grounds (2015), ISBN 9781518760501
3. Cuban Deep (2019), ISBN 9781951249229
4. Fast Attack (2019), ISBN 9781951249014
5. Arabian Storm (2020), ISBN 9781648759031
6. Warshot (2021), ISBN 9798507883295
7. Silent Running (2022), ISBN 9781648752148
8. Snapshot (2023), ASIN B0B1F79QP1

The Ride series (as Jeffery Addison, with Edie Hand):

1. A Christmas Ride: Miracle of the Lights (2009), ISBN 9781933251684
2. The Soldier's Ride (2009), ISBN 9781933251677
3. The Last Christmas Ride: A Novella (2007), novella, ISBN 9781581826241

Stand-alones:

- The Forever Season (1995), ISBN 0312146035
- Wizard of the Wind (1997), ISBN 9780312147693
- Firing Point, or Hunter Killer (2011), with George Wallace, ISBN 9780451237392
- On the Road to Kingdom Come (2012), ISBN 9781481840330
- The Spin (2012), ISBN 9781479109876

=== Young adult novels ===
Rolling Thunder Stock Car Racing series (with Kent Wright):

1. White Lightning (1999), ISBN 0812575067
2. Road to Daytona (1999), ISBN 0812575075
3. Race To Glory (1999), ISBN 0812575083
4. On to Talladega (2000), ISBN 0812575091
5. Young Guns (2000), ISBN 0812545060
6. First to the Flag (2000), ISBN 0812545079
7. Inside Pass (2000), ISBN 0812545087
8. On the Throttle (2001), ISBN 0812545095

=== Non-fiction ===
Biographies

- Bear The Legendary Life of Coach Paul "Bear" Bryant (2006), ISBN 9781581825626
- The Ice Diaries: The Untold Story of the USS Nautilus and the Cold War's Most Daring Mission (2008), with William R. Anderson, ISBN 9780785227595
- We Be Big: The Mostly True Story of How Two Kids from Calhoun County, Alabama, Became Rick & Bubba (2011), with Rick Burgess and Bill Bussey, ISBN 9781401604004
- Mattie C.'s Boy: The Shelley Stewart Story (2013), ISBN 9781603063135
- The Indestructible Man: The True Story of World War II Hero "Captain Dixie" (2015), with David Rocco, ISBN 9781548322595
- Dream On: A Journey to Deliverance (2017), with Steve R. Skipper, ISBN 9781544212494
- The Indestructible Man: The Incredible True Story of the Legendary Sailor the Japanese Couldn't Kill (2021), with David Rocco, ISBN 9780811739641
- Chuck Yeager: World War II Fighter Pilot (2022), ISBN 9780593187272
- Richard Bong: America's #1 Ace Fighter Pilot of World War II (2023), ISBN 9780593187296

Guides

- Riding the Shortwaves: Exploring the Magic of Amateur Radio (2012), ISBN 9781478298519
- Untold Millions: How You Can Capture and Save Eyewitness History (2012), ASIN B00A1SYS5Y
- Writing to be Published... and Read (2012), ISBN 9781370148226
- Get on the Air... Now!: A practical, understandable guide to getting the most from Amateur Radio (2015), ISBN 9781514780893
- The Amateur Radio Dictionary: The most complete glossary of Ham Radio terms ever compiled (2015), ISBN 9781514810040
- Dial Dancing: Tales of the fascinating, fabulous, frequency-hopping, wavelength-walking, power punching, ionosphere-scorching, ditting and dahing, ... wide and wonderful world of amateur radio (2015), ISBN 9781548962685

History

- Gallant Lady: A Biography of the USS Archerfish (2004), with Ken Henry, ISBN 0765305682
- In the Course of Duty: The Heroic Mission of the USS Batfish (2005), ISBN 9780451216595
- Final Patrol: True Stories of World War II Submarines (2006), ISBN 9781101232330
- Once upon a Universe: Perspectives on Our Past (2006), ISBN 9780978065706
- Bar Beneath the Waves: A True Story of Courage and Leadership Aboard a World War II Submarine (2010), ISBN 9780451229281
- Undersea Warrior: The World War II Story of "Mush" Morton and the USS Wahoo (2011), ISBN 9780451234889
- The Ship That Wouldn't Die: The Saga of the USS Neosho: A World War II Story of Courage and Survival at Sea (2015), ISBN 9780451470003
- Only the Brave: July 1944 – The Epic Battle for Guam (2021), ISBN 9780593184592
- Torpedo Run: The Story of WWII Submarine Hero Eugene B. Fluckey (2022), ISBN 9780593185971

Society

- Understanding Sectoral Determination 6: The Private Security Sector, South Africa (2010), ISBN 9780702184918

== Adaptations ==
- Hunter Killer (2018), film directed by Donovan Marsh, based on novel Firing Point
