= WCSN-FM =

- Orange Beach, Alabama; United States
- Frequency: 105.7 MHz
- Branding: Sunny 105.7 FM

Programming
- Format: Classic hits
- Affiliations: United Stations Radio Networks

Ownership
- Owner: Gulf Coast Broadcasting Co., Inc.
- Sister stations: WERM

History
- First air date: 1996
- Former call signs: WXAH (1991–1996); WCSN (1996–2001)

Technical information
- Licensing authority: FCC
- Facility ID: 52820
- Class: A
- ERP: 5,000 watts
- HAAT: 75 meters (246 ft)
- Transmitter coordinates: 30°17′45″N 87°33′42″W

Links
- Public license information: Public file; LMS
- Webcast: Listen Live
- Website: sunny1057.com

WCSN-FM (105.7 MHz, "Sunny 105.7 FM") is a radio station licensed to serve Orange Beach, Alabama, United States. The station is owned by Gulf Coast Broadcasting Co., Inc. It airs a classic hits music format. Its transmitter is near Robertsdale, Alabama.

The station was assigned the WCSN-FM call letters by the Federal Communications Commission on March 26, 2001.
