= WABF (AM) =

Radio station in Mobile, Alabama, United States

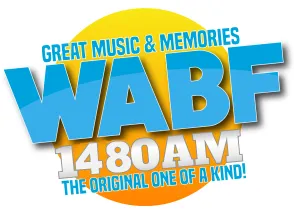
- Mobile, Alabama; United States
- Frequency: 1480 kHz
- Branding: WABF 1480 AM

Programming
- Format: Oldies; adult standards

Ownership
- Owner: Donald Pugh; (Eternity Media Group WABF, LLC)
- Sister stations: WERM

History
- First air date: June 19, 1948; 77 years ago (as WABB)
- Former call signs: WABB (1948–2012); WTKD (2012–2014); WERM (2014–2017)

Technical information
- Licensing authority: FCC
- Facility ID: 70656
- Class: B
- Power: 5,000 watts (day); 4,400 watts (night)
- Transmitter coordinates: 30°43′11.7″N 88°4′16″W

Links
- Public license information: Public file; LMS
- Webcast: Listen live
- Website: www.wabf1480.com

WABF (1480 kHz) is a commercial AM radio station licensed to Mobile, Alabama. It is owned by Donald Pugh, through licensee Eternity Media Group WABF, LLC, broadcasting an oldies and adult standards radio format. WABF's radio studios are on North Church Street in Fairhope.

By day, WABF is powered at 5,000 watts non-directional. At night, to avoid interference to other stations on 1480 AM, WABF reduces power to 4,400 watts and uses a directional antenna. The transmitter is on Dumaine Road at Conception Street Road in Mobile. WABF shares its transmitter site with co-owned WERM (1220 AM). The current hosts are Lori DuBose and Mark Swalley.

== History ==
=== WABB ===
The station first signed on the air on June 19, 1948. It was owned by the Mobile Register daily newspaper, and had the call sign WABB (for "Alabama's Best Broadcasters"). The studios were on Government Street in downtown Mobile until 1969. WABB was a network affiliate of the Mutual Broadcasting System, carrying its dramas, comedies, news and sports during the "Golden Age of Radio".

Owner Bernie Dittman moved to Mobile from his native Ohio to join his father J.W. at the station. Dittman switched WABB to a Top 40 format, aimed at young listeners looking for their favorite contemporary hits.

=== FM stations ===
WABB was simulcast on FM from the very beginning, starting with 107.9 MHz and later 102.1 MHz until it was discontinued in the 1950s. As FM broadcasting became more popular, the station put a new station on the air. WABB-FM 97.5 began on February 5, 1973, with the song "Stuck Inside of Mobile with the Memphis Blues Again" by Bob Dylan. WABB-FM was originally a simulcast of its AM sister station before switching to album oriented rock a few years later.

During its long history, WABB-AM-FM were home to many disc jockeys and news anchors who moved up to major markets and radio networks, including Scott Shannon (later with WHTZ, WPLJ and WCBS-FM in New York City), Leslie Fram, Norman Robinson, Ron Anthony, Dennis "Hound Dog" Stacy, Michael Stuart (Marathon Mike) and Raymond Bannister.

=== Switch to talk ===
Station's last logo as WABB

When WABB-FM made the move to the contemporary hit radio format in 1984, the AM station segued to Adult Top 40. As FM became the preferred band for music listening, WABB flipped to a talk radio format.

WABB's longtime owner, president, and general manager Bernie Dittman died on October 25, 2006, after suffering from a stroke the previous week. Dittman's daughter Betsey succeeded him after relocating to Mobile from Chicago.

In its final years as WABB, the station's talk format featured a line-up of primarily nationally syndicated conservative talk programming along with some locally produced programs. Some of the personalities on the station included national hosts such as Laura Ingraham, Michael Smerconish, Lou Dobbs, and Jerry Doyle. WALA-TV's morning newscast was simulcast weekdays from 5:00 a.m. to 8:00 a.m. WABB was the radio home of Mobile's minor league baseball team the Mobile BayBears from the 2001 through the 2006 seasons.

=== Ownership changes ===
On February 17, 2012, the Dittman family announced on its website that it had sold WABB-FM to the Educational Media Foundation (EMF). That station flipped to the K-LOVE network on March 1, 2012, under the call sign WLVM.

The EMF sale excluded WABB AM and the rights to the WABB call sign, which the Dittman family had chosen to retain for the time being. The family closed the sale of the AM station to Omni Broadcasting on October 24, 2012, and the new owners changed the call sign to WTKD, following a flip to sports talk. Big Fish Broadcasting reserved the WABB call letters for their silent AM radio station in Belton, South Carolina.

WABF was sold to Donald Pugh's Eternity Record Company LLC at a purchase price of $175,000. The transaction was consummated on July 15, 2014. On August 19, 2014, the station changed its call sign to WERM, airing an urban gospel format.

=== Transmitter relocation ===
The station's gospel format gave way to the standards and swap shop programming from sister station WABF (1220 AM) in early February 2017. WABF lost its transmitter site and ran into issues finding a new site, leading to that format migrating to 1480. WERM's urban gospel music migrated to the 1220 facility, which is diplexed on the 1480 tower site. On December 6, 2017, the stations swapped call signs, with WERM assuming its current WABF calls.
