= WERM =

- Fairhope, Alabama; United States
- Broadcast area: Mobile, Alabama
- Frequency: 1220 kHz
- Branding: Gospel 1220

Programming
- Format: Urban Gospel

Ownership
- Owner: Donald H. Pugh, Sr.; (Eternity Media Group WERM, LLC)
- Sister stations: WABF

History
- First air date: August 12, 1961
- Former call signs: WABF (1961–2017)
- Call sign meaning: Eternity Records Mobile

Technical information
- Licensing authority: FCC
- Facility ID: 32848
- Class: D
- Power: 1,000 watts day 30 watts night
- Transmitter coordinates: 30°43′13″N 88°4′16″W

Links
- Public license information: Public file; LMS
- Webcast: Listen live
- Website: wermradio.com/wp/

WERM (1220 AM) is an American radio station licensed to serve the community of Fairhope, Alabama, since 1961. The station's broadcast license is currently held by Donald H. Pugh Sr., through licensee Eternity Media Group WERM, LLC.

WERM broadcasts an Urban Gospel music format to the greater Mobile metropolitan area, including Mobile County and Baldwin County, Alabama. This station formerly broadcast a tradio show called The Gulf Coast Swap Shop, local news, and select programming from the CBS Radio Network.

== History ==
This station began regular operations as WABF on August 12, 1961. Licensed to Eastern Shore Broadcasters, Inc., the station was originally part of the J. Dige Bishop Stations Group. It broadcast with 1,000 watts of power, daytime-only, to protect WGAR (now WHKW) in Cleveland, Ohio, from skywave interference.

Almost two decades later, Eastern Shore Broadcasters, Inc., sold WABF to Bee Cee Broadcasting, Inc., in a deal that closed on July 1, 1978. In March 1992, Bee Cee Broadcasting, Inc., reached a deal to sell WABF to Jubilee Broadcasting Company, Inc., for $350,000. The deal was approved by the FCC on April 20, 1992, and consummated on May 11, 1992. In February 1999, Jubilee Broadcasting Company, Inc., contracted to transfer the broadcast license for WABF to Gulf Coast Broadcasting Company, Inc. The deal gained FCC approval on May 5, 1999, and the transaction was formally consummated on May 20, 1999.

In June 2001, the station applied to increase its nighttime signal strength from 4 to 30 watts while eliminating the directional array in use both day and night to reduce skywave interference. The FCC granted a construction permit for these changes on October 1, 2001, with a scheduled expiration date of October 1, 2004. With construction and testing complete in January 2002, the station applied for a new broadcast license to cover these changes. The FCC granted the new license on March 11, 2002.

Effective August 10, 2016, Gulf Coast sold WABF to Donald H. Pugh, Sr.'s Eternity Media Group, LLC for $105,000.

The station was granted special temporary authority in April 2016 to operate daytime only with 1 kW from one of the WERM towers in Mobile, and it began using that facility as of September 2016. The tower at the WABF studios on Section Street in Fairhope was later taken down. Although the new ownership moved the studios and transmitter, the format remained more or less the same, with a mix of softer oldies and standards. Within a month of beginning operation from the STA site at the WERM tower in Mobile, coverage issues in Fairhope became apparent and the station moved the temporary broadcast back to Fairhope, first from a location near their new studio in downtown and later from a longwire off Twin Beech Road, just a half mile from the old transmitter site. In early February 2017, the format and programming moved to WERM 1480 in Mobile, while that station's gospel programming moved to this frequency. This change was reported to be permanent. On December 6, 2017, the stations swapped call signs, with this station assuming the WERM calls.
