= WPMI-TV =

Television station in Mobile, Alabama

- Mobile, Alabama; Pensacola, Florida; United States
- City: Mobile, Alabama
- Channels: Digital: 15 (UHF); Virtual: 15

Programming
- Affiliations: 15.1: Roar; for others, see § Subchannels

Ownership
- Owner: Deerfield Media; (Deerfield Media (Mobile) Licensee, LLC)
- Operator: Sinclair Broadcast Group
- Sister stations: WEAR-TV; WFGX; WJTC

History
- First air date: March 12, 1982
- Former call signs: WPMI (1982–2004)
- Former channel numbers: Analog: 15 (UHF, 1982–2009); Digital: 47 (UHF, 2000–2009)
- Former affiliations: Independent (1982–1986); Fox (1986–1996); NBC (1996–2025)
- Call sign meaning: Pensacola–Mobile Independent (reference to previous status)

Technical information
- Licensing authority: FCC
- Facility ID: 11906
- ERP: 1,000 kW
- HAAT: 563 m (1,847 ft)
- Transmitter coordinates: 30°36′41″N 87°36′26.4″W

Links
- Public license information: Public file; LMS

WPMI-TV (channel 15) is a television station licensed to Mobile, Alabama, United States, serving southwest Alabama and northwest Florida with programming from the digital multicast network Roar. It is owned by Deerfield Media alongside independent station WJTC (channel 44); both stations are operated by Sinclair Broadcast Group, owner of WEAR-TV (channel 3), a dual affiliate of ABC and NBC, and WFGX (channel 35), an independent station with MyNetworkTV.

WPMI-TV and WJTC share studios on Azalea Road in Mobile; master control and some internal operations are based at the shared facilities of WEAR-TV and WFGX on Mobile Highway (US 90) in unincorporated Escambia County, Florida (with a Pensacola mailing address). WPMI-TV's transmitter is located in unincorporated Baldwin County, Alabama (northeast of Robertsdale).

== History ==
=== Early history ===
WPMI first signed on the air on March 12, 1982, and was the first independent station in the state of Alabama. It was also the first new commercial station to sign on in the Mobile–Pensacola market since future sister station WEAR signed on 28 years earlier. The station was originally owned by Hess Broadcasting and ran a general entertainment programming format consisting of cartoons, westerns, classic sitcoms, old movies, drama shows, and religious programs. WPMI's original studios were located on St. Michael Street in Mobile. In 1985, Hess sold WPMI to Michigan Energy Resources. However, the sale did not affect programming practices. By that time, WPMI was acquiring stronger programming, such as more recent cartoons and off-network sitcom reruns. On October 9, 1986, WPMI became a charter affiliate of the Fox network and began offering prime time programming six months later.

In January 1989, Michigan Energy Resources sold WPMI to Clear Channel Communications; the company (the current-day iHeartMedia) at the time was still a small radio broadcaster in the pre-Telecommunications Act of 1996 era, and WPMI's purchase was its first foray into television.

In 1991, Clear Channel entered into a local marketing agreement, which became a common practice at that time, with Mercury Broadcasting-owned WJTC (channel 44). The company purchased programming time on WJTC to run shows on that station that either did not fit onto WPMI's schedule or were being burned off.

=== NBC affiliation ===
Fox wanted to upgrade affiliates in many markets when it acquired the rights to broadcast games from the NFL's National Football Conference in the mid-1990s. After signing an affiliation deal with New World Communications to switch its "Big Three" affiliates to Fox, the network decided to make affiliate upgrades in smaller markets. In 1995, Fox formed SF Broadcasting in a joint venture with Savoy Pictures, which the network owned a voting stock in, and bought three NBC affiliates and an ABC affiliate; one of the NBC stations it acquired was local rival WALA-TV (channel 10). Almost by default, WPMI was then left to take the NBC affiliation. On January 1, 1996, WALA switched its affiliation to Fox, while the NBC affiliation moved to WPMI. The first NBC program to air on WPMI was Today at 7 a.m. Central Time.

Upon becoming an NBC affiliate, the station began airing more syndicated talk and reality shows. The NBC affiliation's move to WPMI resulted in the station having to move most of the syndicated cartoons and most of the off-network sitcoms that it would no longer have time to air due to network programming commitments to LMA partner WJTC, which became a UPN affiliate two weeks after the switch on January 16, 1995. Clear Channel purchased WJTC outright in 2004, creating a duopoly with WPMI.

On April 20, 2007, Clear Channel Communications entered into an agreement to sell its television stations to private equity firm Providence Equity Partners, in order to focus on its radio properties. On March 15, 2008, WPMI and the other Clear Channel television properties were sold to Providence Equity-operated Newport Television.

In 2009, WPMI began using digital billboards within its viewing area, which featured headlines from the station's Twitter feed alongside a photo of anchors Greg Peterson and Kym Thurman, and chief meteorologist Derek Beasley, a juxtaposition that would prove to be awkward when a headline regarding three people accused in a gang rape which occurred in Monroeville, Alabama, appeared next to the staff picture. A motorist took a picture of the digital billboard and sent it to a South Carolina–based blog, "The Palmetto Scoop". The picture would later appear on Mashable, and was then distributed worldwide in e-mails and other blogs, becoming an internet meme. WPMI general manager Shea Grandquest and news director Wes Finley were reportedly suspended over the incident, though it was never officially confirmed by station executives.

On July 19, 2012, Newport Television announced the sale of WPMI and WJTC, along with five other television stations to the Sinclair Broadcast Group (the owner of WEAR-TV and WFGX). However, due to Federal Communications Commission (FCC) rules which disallowed one company from owning two of the four highest-rated stations or more than two stations overall in the same market, the licenses of WPMI and WJTC were transferred to Deerfield Media, although Sinclair would operate the two stations under a local marketing agreement. The transaction was completed on December 3, 2012. As in certain other markets where Sinclair operates two "Big Three" or "Big Four" affiliates, and due to the stations' distance from Pensacola, many of the operations of WPMI and WJTC remain separate from those of WEAR-TV and WFGX.

On July 28, 2021, the FCC issued a Forfeiture Order against Deerfield Media stemming from a lawsuit involving WPMI-TV. The lawsuit, filed by AT&T, alleged that owner Deerfield Media failed to negotiate for retransmission consent in good faith for WPMI and other Sinclair-managed stations. Deerfield was ordered to pay a fine of $512,228 per station named in the lawsuit, including WPMI.

=== Move of "NBC 15" to WEAR-DT2 ===
On October 20, 2025, the NBC affiliation and the "NBC 15" channel moved to Sinclair-owned WEAR-TV on its second digital subchannel. Programming on WPMI 15.1 was replaced by the Sinclair-owned diginet Roar, and Charge! was relocated from WEAR 3.3 to WPMI 15.3, displacing The Nest to a newly-created subchannel at 15.4.

== News operation ==
Clear Channel Communications decided to start a full-fledged news department for WPMI shortly after the station took the NBC affiliation; the station debuted its local newscasts on January 1, 1996, with an hour-long 6 a.m. newscast, half-hour newscasts at noon and 5 p.m. on weekdays and evening newscasts at 5 and 10 p.m. nightly.

On March 17, 2006, WPMI aired a report featuring interviews with several unidentified African American residents in Crichton, Alabama, describing or speculating about a leprechaun that had reportedly been spotted in a neighborhood tree. The video went viral on the Internet and became widely known as the "Crichton Leprechaun" on websites such as YouTube and Google Video. The story gained national media attention from pundits such as Fox News' Bill O'Reilly and was referenced in episodes of South Park, Web Junk 20, and Tosh.0, where host Daniel Tosh called the "Crichton Leprechaun" the "Gone with the Wind of Internet videos." The video has registered millions of hits and has since spawned a website selling T-shirts inspired by the video.

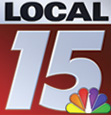
"Local 15" logo, used from August 2009 through September 2017

On August 24, 2009, WPMI adopted the "Local 15" branding, beginning with its 5 p.m. newscast; it also began using "The Weather Authority" as the brand for its weather forecasts. Both brands are a nod to Cincinnati sister station WKRC-TV, which has been known as "Local 12" since 2004 and used "The Weather Authority" name for its weather branding since the late 1980s. On April 22, 2012, WPMI-TV became the fourth and last television station in the Mobile-Pensacola market to begin broadcasting its local newscasts in high definition; the transition occurred the day after WALA-TV upgraded its own newscasts to HD.

On September 9, 2013, WPMI expanded its weekday morning newscast by a half-hour to 4:30 a.m. That same day, it also expanded its weekday noon newscast to one hour with the addition of a half-hour at 12:30 p.m. On September 23, 2013, WPMI began producing two half-hour evening newscasts on sister station WJTC that airs weeknights at 6:30 and 9 p.m.; the 9 p.m. newscast competed with WALA's longer-established prime time newscast (which comparatively runs for one hour) and also competed with fellow sister station WFGX's 9 p.m. newscast that is produced by WEAR-TV (a half-hour program that debuted one month earlier on August 12, 2013). The 6:30 p.m. newscast was canceled in 2016 and the 9 p.m. newscast was moved to 7 p.m. in 2018.

In June 2015, the 4:30 a.m. newscast was canceled; under FCC regulations, a company providing more than 15% of a station's programming per week would have an "attributable interest" in the station, thus counting as ownership. Sinclair could not hold an attributable interest in WPMI due to its ownership of WEAR, as both stations ranked among the top four in the market.

In September 2016, WPMI scaled their noon newscast back to a half-hour to make room for the daily lifestyle program Gulf Coast Today.

In November 2019, WPMI announced they were hiring meteorologist Alan Sealls, who had worked at rival station WKRG for over 20 years until failing to reach a new contract with station management. He made his on-air debut in January 2020.

In April 2023, the morning and noon newscasts and Gulf Coast Today were canceled and 20 members of WPMI's news staff were laid off. The morning newscast was replaced with The National Desk and the noon newscast and Gulf Coast Today were replaced with reruns of Family Feud. Weekend newscasts are now produced by WEAR in Pensacola and are either pre-recorded or simulcast on NBC 15.

As of March 2025, all of the station's main anchors had departed, leaving only four local news personalities remaining.

== Technical information ==
=== Subchannels ===
The station's signal is multiplexed:

Subchannels of WPMI-TV
Subchannel	Res.	Short name	Programming
15.1	1080i	WPMI	Roar
15.2	480i	Quest	Quest
15.3	480i	Charge!	Charge!
15.4	480i	TheNest	The Nest
44.1	1080i	WJTC	WJTC (Independent)

Broadcast on behalf of another station

=== Analog-to-digital conversion ===
WPMI-TV ended regular programming on its analog signal, over UHF channel 15, on June 12, 2009, the official date on which full-power television stations in the United States transitioned from analog to digital broadcasts under federal mandate. The station's digital signal relocated from its pre-transition UHF channel 47 to channel 15 for post-transition operations.
