= Leprechaun (disambiguation) =

A Leprechaun is a type of male faerie in Irish mythology.

Leprechaun may also refer to:

== Film ==
- Leprechaun (film), a 1993 horror film
  - Leprechaun (film series), a horror film and comic franchise

== Music ==
- The Leprechaun (Chick Corea album) (1976)
- The Leprechaun (Lil' Flip album) (2000)

== Other uses ==
- Leprechaun (video game), a 1982 arcade game
- Leprechaunism or Donohue syndrome
- Notre Dame Leprechaun, mascot of the University of Notre Dame
- DeWayne Bruce or (Braun) The Leprechaun, professional wrestler

== See also ==
- Crichton Leprechaun, a news story of a purported leprechaun in Mobile, Alabama
- Kobold, (occasionally cobold) is a sprite stemming from Germanic mythology and surviving into modern times in German folklore
- Leprechaun economics, a term coined by Paul Krugman for Ireland's 2015 26.3% GDP growth rate
- Leprecon (disambiguation)
- Lucky the Leprechaun, the mascot of Lucky Charms brand breakfast cereal
- Menninkäinen, in Finnish mythology, an equivalent to the leprechaun
