= WJTC =

Television station in Pensacola, Florida

ATSC 3.0 station
- Pensacola, Florida; Mobile, Alabama; United States
- City: Pensacola, Florida
- Channels: Digital: 35 (UHF); Virtual: 44
- Branding: UTV 44 (general); NBC 15 News (newscasts)

Programming
- Affiliations: 44.1: Independent; 44.2: Rewind TV; 44.3: True Crime Network

Ownership
- Owner: Deerfield Media; (Deerfield Media (Mobile) Licensee, LLC)
- Operator: Sinclair Broadcast Group
- Sister stations: WEAR-TV; WFGX; WPMI-TV

History
- First air date: December 24, 1984
- Former channel numbers: Analog: 44 (UHF, 1984–2009); Digital: 45 (UHF, 2001–2020)
- Former affiliations: Independent (1984–1995); UPN (1995–2006)

Technical information
- Licensing authority: FCC
- Facility ID: 41210
- ERP: 1,000 kW
- HAAT: 457 m (1,499 ft)
- Transmitter coordinates: 30°35′16.7″N 87°33′12.7″W

Links
- Public license information: Public file; LMS
- Website: utv44.com

WJTC (channel 44) is an independent television station licensed to Pensacola, Florida, United States, serving northwest Florida and southwest Alabama. It is owned by Deerfield Media alongside WPMI-TV (channel 15); both stations are operated by Sinclair Broadcast Group, owner of WEAR-TV (channel 3), a dual affiliate of ABC and NBC, and WFGX (channel 35), an independent station with MyNetworkTV.

WJTC and WPMI-TV share studios on Azalea Road in Mobile, Alabama; master control and some internal operations are based at the shared facilities of WEAR-TV and WFGX on Mobile Highway (US 90) in unincorporated Escambia County, Florida (with a Pensacola mailing address). WJTC's transmitter is located near Robertsdale, Alabama.

== History ==
WJTC signed on the air on December 24, 1984 as an independent station; the station was founded by its original owners, the Mercury Broadcasting Company. The station—which was branded as "C44"—maintained a general entertainment programming format consisting of old movies, cartoons, westerns, dramas, and a few classic sitcoms.

In 1991, Clear Channel Communications, then-owner of WPMI, entered into a local marketing agreement with WJTC. Mercury Broadcasting retained the license, but Clear Channel owned local rights to programming broadcast on the station. WJTC affiliated with the United Paramount Network (UPN) upon its debut on January 16, 1995. Clear Channel acquired WJTC outright in 2001, creating a duopoly with WPMI.

On January 24, 2006, CBS Corporation and Time Warner announced the shutdown of both UPN and The WB effective that fall. A new "fifth" network—"The CW" (named after its corporate parents), to be jointly owned by both companies, would launch in their place, with a lineup primarily featuring the most popular programs from both networks. On February 22, 2006, News Corporation announced that it would launch a network of its own called MyNetworkTV, which would be operated by Fox Television Stations and its syndication division Twentieth Television. WJTC was passed over for both the CW affiliation (which went to WBPG; channel 55, now WFNA) and that of MyNetworkTV (which went to WFGX), both former WB affiliates (from 2001 to 2006 and from 1995 to 2001, respectively). As a result, WJTC became an independent station once again on September 10, 2006, five days before UPN was to shut down.

On April 20, 2007, Clear Channel entered into an agreement to sell its entire television station group to Providence Equity Partners. On March 15, 2008, WJTC, WPMI and the other Clear Channel television properties were sold to Newport Television, a company created by Providence to run the newly acquired stations.

Newport announced on July 19, 2012, that it would sell five of its stations, including WJTC and WPMI, to the Sinclair Broadcast Group. As Sinclair already owned WEAR-TV and WFGX in the Mobile–Pensacola market, which would violate rules set by the Federal Communications Commission (FCC) restricting the maximum number of television stations in a single market owned by one company to two, the stations' licenses were instead acquired by Deerfield Media; however, Sinclair began operating both stations through a local marketing agreement. The sale was completed on December 3, 2012. However, due to the stations' distance from Pensacola along with the Florida-Alabama border separating the two cities, the operations of WJTC and WPMI remained separate from those of WEAR-TV and WFGX.

=== 2020 tower accident ===
On October 20, 2020, one individual died when a contracting crew was working on the WJTC television tower. According to Sheriff Hoss Mack, debris fell and hit the workers, killing one of them. The workers climbed the tower to repair a guy cable as part of an ongoing maintenance project. Expert technical high-rise crews with the Mobile Fire Department, the Foley Fire Department and Escambia County, Florida, were called in. The Occupational Safety and Health Administration (OSHA) investigated the incident.

=== 2021 FCC fine ===
On July 28, 2021, the FCC issued a Forfeiture Order against Deerfield Media stemming from a lawsuit involving WJTC. The lawsuit, filed by AT&T, alleged that Deerfield Media failed to negotiate for retransmission consent in good faith for WJTC and other Sinclair-managed stations. Deerfield was ordered to pay a fine of $512,228 per station named in the lawsuit, including WJTC.

== Programming ==
=== Sports programming ===
WJTC broadcasts local high school football games on Friday nights during the fall season. Playoff games were aired as well, but unlike the regular season, these were tape-delayed because of the Alabama High School Athletic Association's regulations. This playoff coverage ended after the 2016 season.

=== Newscasts ===
When WJTC signed on the air in 1984, the station produced a morning news program called Mornin' along with the market's first prime time newscast at 9 p.m. (predating the launch of WALA's 9 p.m. newscast by 14 years). The broadcasts originated from studios in downtown Pensacola. The 9 p.m. weeknight newscast was moved to 10 p.m. in the hopes of attracting more viewers, while the weekend evening newscast continued to air in the 9 p.m. timeslot, supplemented with the syndicated national and international news program Independent Network News. The morning and evening newscasts were discontinued by May 31, 1986. Another attempt at a 9 p.m. newscast on the station was made many years later (after WJTC was sold and its facilities moved to Mobile).

Outside of promotions for WPMI's newscasts and simulcasts of that station's severe weather coverage, WJTC did not air any news programming. However, on September 23, 2013, WPMI began producing two half-hour evening newscasts on WJTC that air weeknights at 6:30 and 9 p.m.; the 9 p.m. newscast competes with WALA's longer-established prime time newscast (which comparatively runs for one hour) and also competed with sister station WFGX's 9 p.m. newscast produced by WEAR-TV (a half-hour program that debuted one month earlier on August 12, 2013).

WJTC canceled its 6:30 p.m. newscast on July 29, 2016, and replaced it with Inside Edition the following Monday. The 9 p.m. newscast was moved to 7 p.m. in June 2018.

== Technical information ==
=== Subchannels ===
The station's ATSC 1.0 channels are carried on the multiplexed signals of sister stations WEAR-TV and WPMI-TV:

Subchannels provided by WJTC (ATSC 1.0)
Subchannel	Res.	Short name	Programming	ATSC 1.0 host
44.1	1080i	WJTC-TV	Independent	WPMI-TV
44.2	480i	Rewind	Rewind TV	WEAR-TV
44.3	480i	TCN	True Crime Network	WEAR-TV

44.2 was silent until March 1, 2022, when it was reactivated with Rewind TV; it was the home of Grit from 2014 until 2021 when it moved to a fourth digital subchannel of WFNA.

=== Analog-to-digital conversion ===
WJTC discontinued regular programming on its analog signal, over UHF channel 44, on February 17, 2009, the original target date on which full-power television stations in the United States were to transition from analog to digital broadcasts under federal mandate (which was later pushed back to June 12, 2009). The station's digital signal remained on its pre-transition UHF channel 45, using virtual channel 44.

=== ATSC 3.0 ===
Subchannels of WJTC (ATSC 3.0)
Subchannel	Res.	Short name	Programming
3.1		WEAR	ABC (WEAR-TV)
3.10	1080p	T2	T2
3.11		PBTV	Pickleballtv
10.1	1080p	WALA	Fox (WALA-TV)
15.1		WPMI	Roar (WPMI-TV)
44.1		WJTC	Independent

Subchannel streamed via the Internet
