= List of Comet affiliates =

The following is a list of affiliates for Comet, a digital subchannel network owned by the Sinclair Broadcast Group.

== Affiliates ==
List of Comet TV affiliates
Media market	State/Dist./Terr.	Station	Channel
Birmingham	Alabama	WTTO	21.3
Phoenix	Arizona	KTVK	3.2
Harrison	Arkansas	K26GS-D	26.6
Little Rock	Arkansas	KATV	7.2
Bakersfield	California	KBFX-CD	29.3
Chico–Redding	California	KRCR-TV	7.3
Eureka	California	KAEF-TV	23.3
Fresno	California	KMPH-TV	26.3
Los Angeles	California	KCAL-TV	9.3
Sacramento–Stockton–Modesto	California	KXTV	10.5
San Francisco	California	KPIX-TV	5.5
Denver	Colorado	KWGN-TV	2.3
Hartford–New Haven	Connecticut	WCCT-TV	20.3
Washington	District of Columbia	WJLA-TV	7.3
Fort Walton Beach	Florida	WFGX	35.3
Gainesville	Florida	WNBW-DT	9.3
Jacksonville	Florida	WTLV	12.7
Miami–Fort Lauderdale	Florida	WBFS-TV	33.4
Orlando	Florida	WOTF-TV	26.3
Tallahassee	Florida	WTLF	24.2
West Palm Beach	Florida	WPEC	12.3
Albany	Georgia	WFXL	31.3
Atlanta	Georgia	WUPA	69.3
Macon	Georgia	WGXA	24.3
Savannah	Georgia	WTGS	28.2
Honolulu	Hawaii	KIKU	20.3
Boise	Idaho	KYUU-LD	35.3
Lewiston	Idaho	KLEW-TV	3.3
Chicago	Illinois	WBBM-TV	2.5
Peoria	Illinois	WHOI	19.2
Springfield	Illinois	WICS	20.2
Urbana	Illinois	WICD	15.2
Bloomington–Indianapolis	Indiana	WTTV	4.3
Fort Wayne	Indiana	WLMO-LD	2.2
Des Moines	Iowa	KDSM-TV	17.2
Cedar Rapids-Waterloo-Dubuque	Iowa	KFXA	28.3
Sioux City	Iowa	KMEG	14.3
Wichita	Kansas	KSAS-TV	24.3
Lexington	Kentucky	WDKY-TV	56.4
Lafayette	Louisiana	K21OM-D	20.5
New Orleans	Louisiana	WNOL-TV	38.3
Portland	Maine	WPFO	23.3
Baltimore	Maryland	WNUV	54.3
Boston	Massachusetts	WFXT	25.2
Cheboygan–Sault Ste. Marie	Michigan	WTOM	4.3
Detroit	Michigan	WKBD-TV	50.2
Flint	Michigan	WSMH	66.3
Grand Rapids	Michigan	WWMT	3.3
Traverse City	Michigan	WPBN-TV	7.3
Minneapolis–Saint Paul	Minnesota	WUCW	23.2
Cape Girardeau	Missouri	KBSI	23.3
Hannibal	Missouri	KHQA-TV	7.3
Jefferson City–Columbia	Missouri	KRCG	13.2
Kansas City	Missouri	KCTV	5.2
Kirksville	Missouri	KTVO	3.3
St. Louis	Missouri	KPLR-TV	11.3
Bozeman	Montana	KDBZ-CD	6.2
Butte	Montana	KTVM-TV	6.2
Kalispell	Montana	KCFW-TV	9.2
Missoula	Montana	KECI-TV	13.2
Omaha	Nebraska	KPTM	42.3
Elko	Nevada	KENV-DT	10.1
Las Vegas	Nevada	KSNV	3.4
Reno	Nevada	KNSN-TV	21.3
Reno	Nevada	KRNV-DT	4.2
Farmington	New Mexico	KOBF	12.3
Roswell	New Mexico	KOBR	8.3
Albany	New York	WRGB	6.3
Buffalo	New York	WNYO-TV	49.3
New York City	New York	WCBS-TV	2.5
Rochester	New York	WUHF	31.3
Syracuse	New York	WSTM-TV	3.3
Charlotte	North Carolina	WSOC-TV	9.4
Charlotte	North Carolina	WWJS	14.3
Durham–Raleigh	North Carolina	WRDC	28.3
Greensboro–Winston-Salem	North Carolina	WMYV	48.3
New Bern–Greenville	North Carolina	WCTI-TV	12.2
Bismarck–Minot	North Dakota	KNDB	26.7
Fargo–Grand Forks	North Dakota	KRDK-TV	4.3
Cincinnati	Ohio	WSTR-TV	64.5
Cleveland	Ohio	WJW	8.3
Columbus	Ohio	WWHO	53.3
Dayton	Ohio	WRGT-TV	45.4
Toledo	Ohio	WNWO-TV	24.3
Oklahoma City	Oklahoma	KOCB	34.3
Tulsa	Oklahoma	KOKI-TV	23.5
Coos Bay	Oregon	KMCB-DT	23.3
Eugene	Oregon	KMTR	16.3
Medford	Oregon	KTVL	10.3
Portland	Oregon	KATU	2.3
Roseburg	Oregon	KTCW-DT	46.3
Johnstown	Pennsylvania	WJAC-TV	6.3
Philadelphia	Pennsylvania	WPHL-TV	17.4
Pittsburgh	Pennsylvania	WPNT	22.3
Scranton–Wilkes-Barre	Pennsylvania	WSWB	38.3
Aguadilla	Puerto Rico	WSJP-LD	18.3
Providence	Rhode Island	WJAR	10.3
Columbia	South Carolina	WACH	57.3
Florence	South Carolina	WPDE-TV	15.3
Chattanooga	Tennessee	WDSI-TV	61.2
Memphis	Tennessee	WATN-TV	24.7
Nashville	Tennessee	WUXP-TV	30.3
Amarillo	Texas	KVII-TV	7.3
Dallas–Fort Worth	Texas	KTXD-TV	47.2
El Paso	Texas	KFOX-TV	14.2
Harlingen–Brownsville	Texas	KGBT-TV	4.3
Houston	Texas	KHOU	11.4
Midland–Odessa	Texas	KUPB	18.3
Port Arthur–Beaumont	Texas	KBTV-TV	4.3
Waco	Texas	KZCZ-LD	34.2
Salt Lake City	Utah	KJZZ-TV	14.2
Bristol	Virginia	WCYB-TV	5.3
Lynchburg	Virginia	WSET-TV	13.3
Norfolk	Virginia	WTVZ-TV	33.3
Richmond	Virginia	WRLH-TV	35.3
Seattle–Tacoma	Washington	KOMO-TV	4.2
Kennewick	Washington	KVVK-CD	15.2
Yakima	Washington	KUNW-CD	2.2
Charleston	West Virginia	WVAH-TV	11.3
Moorefield	West Virginia	W29DH-D	29.3
Green Bay	Wisconsin	WCWF	14.2
Madison	Wisconsin	WMSN-TV	47.2
Milwaukee	Wisconsin	WVTV	24.2
