= John Edd Thompson =

American meteorologist (1942 – 2025)

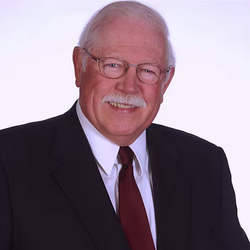
- Born: June 25, 1942; Mobile, Alabama
- Died: May 5, 2025 (aged 82); Mobile, Alabama
- Occupation: Chief meteorologist
- Years active: 1969–2009 (40 years)

John Edd Thompson (June 25, 1942 – May 5, 2025) was an American meteorologist who was the chief meteorologist for WALA-TV in Mobile, Alabama. Thompson reported the weather for people on the central Gulf Coast since 1969. Thompson retired on June 5, 2009, to spend more time with family.

== Life and career ==
Thompson, a Mobile native earned his degrees in geosciences and communications from Mississippi State University and the University of Alabama respectively. While studying journalism at the University of Alabama, Thompson decided he would rather pursue interests in radio and gained experience at WNPT-FM in Tuscaloosa. Thompson would later gain more radio experience in WARF in Jasper, Alabama, WTUF in Georgia and WABB in Mobile. In Mobile, he gained a job at WKRG doing a local country music show titled TV-5 Party Line. The station moved Thompson to weather in 1971, and he would end up doing weekend weather segments at WALA-TV in 1977, then affiliated with NBC. After six months, Thompson was moved to weekly weather. During Hurricane Katrina, Thompson found out on-air that his home in Dauphin Island was destroyed. "I didn't realize it was gone until I saw the aerial pictures the next morning," Thompson recalled in 2009. "Basically, since we were on the air I just kind of gulped and kept going." Thompson retired on June 5, 2009.

Thompson had several other interests, and dabbled in music for three decades. He was one of the founding members of the Mobile Songwriters Association and a member of the Nashville Songwriters Association International. He also participated in the Frank Brown Songwriters Festival that is held every November in Gulf Shores, Alabama.

Thompson's last newscast was broadcast the night of Friday, June 5, 2009. The special newscast featured former WALA newscasters and reporters and sports personalities extending their thanks. On the special, Thompson announced he had taken a job in Los Angeles, California teaching acting students (however, this would be part-time). Thompson still resided in Mobile until his death.

He was the grandfather of Brad, Caroline, Tanner, and Grace.

Thompson died on May 5, 2025, at the age of 82. His death was announced on May 6.

== Awards and recognition ==
Since the Press-Register introduced its Readers' Choice Awards in 2002, the final results always placed Thompson first. In the past the Mobile Press Club named him "Best Weather Anchor", but Thompson's biggest honor from these industry professionals came in September 2005 with the John Harris Achievement Award for his contributions to broadcasting over a long period of time.

== Filmography ==
- Soultaker (News Anchor)
- In the Heat of the Night ("Bailiff" in episode "Unfinished Business")
- Bloodlines: Murder in the Family (Jail Guard)
- Felony (Reporter)
- He also made a cameo appearance in the movie Close Encounters of the Third Kind, which was filmed in Mobile and surrounding areas.
