= CBS 29 =

CBS 29 may refer to one of the following television stations in the United States:

== Current ==
- KBAK-TV in Bakersfield, California
- KIMA-TV in Yakima, Washington
- WTTK in Kokomo–Indianapolis, Indiana
  - Full-time satellite of WTTV in Bloomington, Indiana

== Former ==
- KTVP (now KHOG-TV) in Fayetteville, Arkansas (1977 to 1978)
  - Was a translator for KFPW-TV (now KHBS-TV) in Fort Smith, Arkansas
- WCDB in Hagaman, New York
  - Was a satellite of WCDA (now WTEN) in Albany, New York (1957 to 1977)
