= WEAR-TV =

Television station in Pensacola, Florida

- Pensacola–Fort Walton Beach, Florida; Mobile, Alabama; United States
- City: Pensacola, Florida
- Channels: Digital: 17 (UHF); Virtual: 3
- Branding: 3.1: WEAR ABC 3 or Channel 3; WEAR News; 3.2: NBC 15

Programming
- Affiliations: 3.1: ABC; 3.2: NBC

Ownership
- Owner: Sinclair Broadcast Group; (WEAR Licensee, LLC)
- Sister stations: WFGX; WJTC; WPMI-TV

History
- First air date: January 13, 1954
- Former channel numbers: Analog: 3 (VHF, 1954–2009)
- Former affiliations: CBS (1954–1955); ABC (secondary, 1954–1955); Roar (3.2, until 2025)
- Call sign meaning: derived from WEAR radio, randomly assigned

Technical information
- Licensing authority: FCC
- Facility ID: 71363
- ERP: 1,000 kW
- HAAT: 579 m (1,900 ft)
- Transmitter coordinates: 30°36′45.4″N 87°38′41.6″W

Links
- Public license information: Public file; LMS
- Website: 3.1: weartv.com; 3.2: mynbc15.com

WEAR-TV (channel 3) is a television station licensed to Pensacola, Florida, United States, serving northwest Florida and southwest Alabama as an affiliate of ABC and NBC. It is owned by Sinclair Broadcast Group alongside WFGX (channel 35)—an independent station with MyNetworkTV—and is co-managed with WPMI-TV (channel 15) and WJTC (channel 44).

WEAR-TV and WFGX share studios—which also house master control and some internal operations for WPMI-TV and WJTC—on Mobile Highway (US 90) in unincorporated Escambia County, Florida (with a Pensacola mailing address); WEAR-TV's transmitter is located in unincorporated Baldwin County, Alabama (northeast of Robertsdale). Weekday newscasts and any remaining operations for "NBC 15" that were once part of WPMI-TV prior to October 20, 2025, remain in Mobile, Alabama, at the studios of WPMI and WJTC.

Although WEAR-TV's call letters represent both the words "wear" and "ear", the station spells out its calls as "W-E-A-R", rather than any word.

== History ==
In 1952, when the Federal Communications Commission (FCC) lifted its four-year television applications freeze, WEAR (1230 AM) and WCOA (1370 AM) both filed for new stations on channel 3 at Pensacola, Florida. WCOA dropped its bid in June 1953, allowing WEAR to be granted the permit; the withdrawal was half of an agreement by which WEAR dropped an application for channel 36 in Jacksonville to allow WJHP, sister station to WCOA, to get that channel unopposed.

The station first signed on the air on January 13, 1954. Initially, the station was a primary CBS affiliate with a secondary ABC affiliation. In 1955, WKRG-TV (channel 5) signed on as the CBS affiliate for the Mobile–Pensacola area, and WEAR became an exclusive ABC affiliate. In 1959, it was sold to Rollins Telecasting, which completed a construction project already in progress: the completion of a new tower in Baldwin County, Alabama. Rollins was purchased by Heritage Communications, an operator of cable systems in 1986; when Tele-Communications Inc. acquired the cable systems the next year, management carried out a leveraged buyout of the broadcast division to form Heritage Media.

In October 1997, WEAR and the other Heritage stations were sold to the Sinclair Broadcast Group just as the remainder of Heritage Media was merging with News Corporation (the then-parent company of Fox). This sale also protected former longtime NBC affiliate WALA-TV (channel 10) as the market's Fox outlet; otherwise WEAR would have been forced to switch its network affiliation to Fox. Sinclair prohibited its ABC affiliates, including WEAR, from airing a Nightline broadcast in 2004 that featured a segment displaying the names of those who died in the war in Iraq, because the company felt it was anti-war rhetoric against the invasion.

In late 2006, Sinclair entered into negotiations with Mediacom, the main cable provider for parts of the Florida side of the market (including Santa Rosa County and Pensacola Beach). The two companies could not reach an agreement over retransmission fees. As a result, Mediacom pulled all of Sinclair's stations (including WEAR) from its systems on January 6, 2007. The dispute ended on February 2, when the two sides reached an agreement that restored WEAR to Mediacom systems. Upon the expiration of the 2007 agreement on January 1, 2010, Mediacom was prepared to drop the station once again from its systems. Sinclair agreed to a temporary extension until January 8 in order to allow the Bowl Championship Series college football games to be viewed on Sinclair's ABC and Fox affiliates over Mediacom. Eventually, a one-year agreement was reached which would keep Sinclair stations on the cable television provider until 2011.

In 2012, Newport Television sold five of its stations, including WPMI and WJTC, to Sinclair. However, since Sinclair already owns WEAR and WFGX, WPMI and WJTC were sold to Deerfield Media, while Sinclair operates the two stations under local marketing agreements. The sale created one of the few instances where two "Big Three" stations are operated by the same company. However, the two operations have remained separate operations aside from master control for WPMI and WJTC moving to WEAR's building in 2017, and weekend newscasts for WPMI originating out of WEAR beginning in April 2023.

On October 20, 2025, "NBC 15" relocated from WPMI 15.1 to WEAR 3.2, bringing the NBC affiliation and programming for NBC 15 completely under Sinclair's ownership. Roar relocated to WPMI 15.1, and WEAR 3.3 was deleted to make WEAR 3.2 available in high definition. The Charge! network relocated to WPMI 15.3, resulting in The Nest moving to a newly-created WPMI 15.4 subchannel. The NBC 15 and UTV44 operation in Mobile remained.

== News operation ==
Since WEAR is the only major-network station licensed on the Florida side of the market, the station's newscasts tend to focus more on Pensacola. It does, however, operate a bureau on Dauphin Street in downtown Mobile. Because of WEAR's then-hour-long 10 p.m. newscast, it was one of the last ABC affiliates to continue to air the network's late night programming (including Nightline and presently Jimmy Kimmel Live! since the two shows switched timeslots nationally in January 2013) on a half-hour tape delay, starting at 11 p.m. The additional half-hour of the 10 p.m. broadcast began as Channel 3 News Extra, but has since evolved into an extension of the 10 p.m. newscast.

The station launched a 4 p.m. newscast in December 2007. On September 7, 2008, WEAR-TV was the first station in the Mobile–Pensacola market to begin broadcasting its local newscasts in high definition; field video remained pillarboxed for almost three years, until widescreen and eventually high definition video began supplementing the newscasts in 2011. On July 15, 2013, the weekday edition of WEAR's morning newscast, 3 in the Morning expanded by a half-hour, moving its start time to 4:30 a.m., putting them in competition with WALA's already existing 4:30 a.m. newscast.

On August 12, 2013, WEAR launched a new half-hour, weeknight-only newscast at 9 p.m. on sister station WFGX. The newscast airs in direct competition with WALA's long-established, dominant, and hour-long 9 p.m. newscast. This marked the first time that newscasts aired on WFGX since it shut down its in-house news department in 1998 after two years (the 6:30 and 9 p.m. newscasts WFGX produced specifically focused on Okaloosa County, Florida). This newscast was canceled in the fall of 2021 when Sinclair launched the evening editions of The National News Desk across their secondary stations.

In April 2023, after the downsizing of WPMI's operations in Mobile, weekend newscasts began to be produced out of WEAR for NBC 15 as either a straight simulcast or pre-recorded if it interfered with the air time of WEAR. Reporters and on-air staffers from WEAR supplement NBC 15's coverage and have filled in for staffers if they are not available.

On September 29, 2025, WEAR launched The Morning Current, a 7–8 a.m. extension of WEAR's morning news on sister station WFGX.

=== Notable former on-air staff ===
- Steve Berthiaume – sports anchor
- Mark Curtis – anchor/reporter

== Technical information ==
=== Subchannels ===
The station's signal is multiplexed:

Subchannels of WEAR-TV
Subchannel	Res.	Short name	Programming
3.1	720p	WEAR	ABC
3.2	1080i	NBC	NBC
44.2	480i	Rewind	Rewind TV (WJTC)
44.3	480i	TCN	True Crime Network (WJTC)

Broadcast on behalf of another station

WEAR formerly carried The Tube on its second digital subchannel until early 2007, when it was replaced with a standard definition feed of the station's main channel, which lasted until around 2010. In 2011, The Country Network began occupying the second subchannel, after the network moved from sister station WFGX.

=== Analog-to-digital conversion ===
WEAR-TV ended regular programming on its analog signal, over VHF channel 3, on June 12, 2009, the official date on which full-power television stations in the United States transitioned from analog to digital broadcasts under federal mandate. The station's digital signal remained on its pre-transition UHF channel 17, using virtual channel 3.
