= CW 55 =

CW 55 may refer to the following television stations in the U.S. owned-and-operated by the CW:

- WBNX-TV in Akron–Cleveland, Ohio
- WFNA-TV in Gulf Shores–Mobile, Alabama
- WMYT-TV in Charlotte, North Carolina–Rock Hill, South Carolina
