= WLVV =

WLVV may refer to:

- WLVV (FM), a radio station (88.3 FM) licensed to Midland, Maryland, United States
- WKKT, a radio station (96.9 FM) licensed to Statesville, North Carolina, United States, which held the call sign WLVV from 1981 to 1985
- WNGL, a radio station (1410 AM) licensed to Mobile, Alabama, United States, which held the call sign WLVV from 1991 to 2009
