= WFGX =

Television station in Fort Walton Beach, Florida

- Fort Walton Beach–Pensacola, Florida; Mobile, Alabama; United States
- City: Fort Walton Beach, Florida
- Channels: Digital: 14 (UHF); Virtual: 35
- Branding: WFGX 35

Programming
- Affiliations: 35.1: Independent with MyNetworkTV; 35.2: Story Television; 35.3: Comet

Ownership
- Owner: Sinclair Broadcast Group; (WFGX Licensee, LLC)
- Sister stations: WEAR-TV; WJTC; WPMI-TV

History
- Founded: December 20, 1983
- First air date: April 7, 1987
- Former call signs: WQAC (1983–1987)
- Former channel numbers: Analog: 35 (UHF, 1987–2009); Digital: 50 (UHF, until 2020)
- Former affiliations: Independent (1987–1996, 2001–2006); The WB (1996–2001)
- Call sign meaning: Family Group Broadcasting (founding owners), "X" as a placeholder

Technical information
- Licensing authority: FCC
- Facility ID: 6554
- ERP: 1,000 kW
- HAAT: 582.8 m (1,912 ft)
- Transmitter coordinates: 30°36′45.4″N 87°38′41.6″W

Links
- Public license information: Public file; LMS
- Website: wfgxtv.com

WFGX (channel 35) is a television station licensed to Fort Walton Beach, Florida, United States, serving northwest Florida and southwest Alabama. It is programmed primarily as an independent station, but maintains a secondary affiliation with MyNetworkTV. WFGX is owned by Sinclair Broadcast Group alongside dual ABC/NBC affiliate WEAR-TV (channel 3) and is co-managed with WPMI-TV (channel 15) and WJTC (channel 44).

WFGX and WEAR-TV share studios—which also house master control and some internal operations for WPMI-TV and WJTC—on Mobile Highway (US 90) in unincorporated Escambia County, Florida (with a Pensacola mailing address); WFGX's transmitter is located in unincorporated Baldwin County, Alabama (northeast of Robertsdale).

== History ==
WFGX signed on the air on April 7, 1987, as an independent station, the second in the market after WJTC. It was the third of four stations in Florida to be owned by Tampa-based Family Group Broadcasting, and the second Florida station founded by it after Tampa's WFTS-TV (which had been sold three years prior).

In 1995, Family Group Broadcasting entered into a local marketing agreement (LMA) with Heritage Media, then-owner of WEAR. This enabled WFGX to become the area's WB affiliate on September 29, 1996, taking the affiliation from WBQP-CD. The station's former analog signal on UHF channel 35 was very weak (509 kilowatts), resulting in marginal (at best) reception outside Okaloosa County. It was barely viewable even in Pensacola, and could not be seen at all over the air on the Alabama side of the market. Despite the shortfall in coverage, WFGX has long identified as "Pensacola–Fort Walton Beach," which is unusual since the city of license is normally listed first when a station references another city in its legal on-air identification. It had to rely on cable and satellite carriage in order to reach the entire market.

Sinclair Broadcast Group took over WFGX's operations after Heritage sold its television division to Sinclair in 1997. When the stronger WBPG (channel 55, now WFNA) signed on from Gulf Shores, Alabama, on September 2, 2001, it replaced WFGX as the area's WB affiliate. WFGX then became an independent station, airing home shopping programming from Jewelry Television, syndicated shows and infomercials. Sinclair purchased WFGX outright in 2004.

On February 22, 2006, News Corporation announced that it would launch a new network called MyNetworkTV, which would be operated by Fox Television Stations and its syndication division Twentieth Television. Sinclair opted to affiliate several of its stations (including WFGX) with the new programming service, which launched on September 5, 2006.

WFGX discontinued regular programming on its analog signal, over UHF channel 35, on June 12, 2009, the official date on which full-power television stations in the United States transitioned from analog to digital broadcasts under federal mandate. The station's digital signal remained on its pre-transition UHF channel 50, using virtual channel 35.

At the same time, WFGX increased its digital signal to 1 million watts (equivalent to 5 million watts in analog), which was enough to provide a good signal to viewers in Pensacola. However, it was still practically unviewable on the Alabama side of the market. In July 2010, WFGX's digital transmitter was moved from Gulf Breeze, Florida, to WEAR's tower east of Rosinton, Alabama. With the same power output at the new location, it is now able to offer a signal comparable to those of the other full-powered stations in the market. Within two months, the station began offering a high definition signal over-the-air for the first time, and the transmitter move allowed Sinclair to invoke must-carry status on the Alabama side of the market for the station in order to also carry WEAR through retransmission consent.

== Newscasts ==
In 1996, WFGX began producing nightly newscasts at 6:30 and 9 p.m. called Emerald Coast News originating from its original studios on Beach Drive in Fort Walton Beach. Each broadcast aired for 30 minutes and stories on the newscasts specifically focused on Okaloosa County, Florida, helping to provide better coverage for WEAR. On December 11, 1998, Emerald Coast News was canceled by WFGX.

On August 12, 2013, sister station WEAR-TV began producing a weeknight-only, half-hour prime time newscast at 9 p.m. for WFGX. The newscast competes with Fox affiliate WALA-TV (channel 10)'s long established, dominant and hour-long 9 p.m. newscast, but due to WEAR's Pensacola focus, provides some differing content from WALA's Mobile-centric news operation.

== Subchannels ==
The station's signal is multiplexed:

Subchannels of WFGX
Subchannel	Res.	Short name	Programming
35.1	1080i	WFGX	Main WFGX programming
35.2	480i	Story	Story Television
35.3	480i	Comet	Comet
55.2	480i	Bounce	Bounce TV (WFNA)
55.3	480i	Busted	Busted (WFNA)
55.4	480i	Grit	Grit (WFNA)

Broadcast on behalf of another station
