= Alan Sealls =

American television meteorologist and educator

- Born: Mount Vernon, New York, United States
- Education: Florida State University; Cornell University
- Occupation: Chief Meteorologist
- Employer(s): WPMI-TV; WKRG-TV; WGN-TV

Alan Sealls is a retired broadcast meteorologist and educator. For two decades, he worked as chief meteorologist for WKRG-TV in Mobile, Alabama, leaving that station in 2019 before moving in 2020 to WPMI-TV in Mobile, where he retired in 2024. Before settling in Mobile in 1999, Sealls worked at television stations in Georgia, Wisconsin, and Illinois.

A sixteen-time regional Emmy Award-winner, Sealls is a Fellow of the American Meteorological Society (AMS) and was elected 2025 president-elect of the organization (to serve as president in 2026). In 2017, his weather forecasting for Hurricane Irma went viral on social media, leading to national news coverage.

== Background ==
Sealls was born in Mount Vernon, New York. He earned his bachelor's degree in meteorology from Cornell University, and his master's degree from Florida State University. He began his broadcasting career at WALB-TV in Albany, Georgia. From 1988 to 1992, he worked at WTMJ-TV/AM in Milwaukee, Wisconsin. From there, he worked at Chicago's WGN-TV for five years (which included national exposure on WGN's superstation feed), and then at WMAQ-TV; he also taught meteorology classes at Columbia College Chicago.

He moved south to Mobile in 1999, where he joined WKRG-TV. He teaches weather broadcasting at the University of South Alabama each spring, according to the news station's website. In addition, he has produced over four dozen weather videos for schools, distributed throughout North America.

In 2017, a segment of Sealls updating viewers on Hurricane Irma went viral on social media, topping the front page of Reddit and becoming the third most trending clip on YouTube. A number of commenters praised Sealls' calm, patient demeanor, likening his delivery to Bob Ross or Mr. Rogers. The clips attracted news coverage from The Washington Post. For Sealls, the moment was gratifying: "It was amazing that something that I’ve always done, the exact same way, suddenly went viral. It was a positive thing, because most things that start trending on the internet are, in my opinion, either goofy or silly or somehow embarrassing – things that don’t necessarily have value in the long run. But this is one where people got excited about science, they got excited about learning, so to me, that was a really wonderful thing."

In 2019, he parted ways with WKRG after being unable to negotiate a contract renewal. Sealls confirmed he plans to "remain active both in the community and as a meteorologist."

It was announced on November 19, 2019 that Alan would be returning to the airwaves starting in January 2020 on WPMI-TV.

== Awards and recognition ==
Sealls is the current President-Elect for the American Meteorological Society. He holds his professional certifications from the AMS and the National Weather Association (NWA). He is a Fellow of the AMS. Sealls has served as a councilor and board chair for both the AMS and NWA, as well as a panelist for the NWA Seal of Approval. He also serves on the NWA Diversity Committee and acts as a NWA mentor.

Sealls is a sixteen-time regional Emmy Award-winner, and won a national award from the AMS in 2009 for a series on climate change. In 2015, he received a best-in-state award for his documentary retrospective on Hurricane Ivan. In 2017, he received a Dr. Martin Luther King Jr. award for community service from People United to Advance the Dream.
