= SF Broadcasting =

American media company

- Type: Private
- Industry: Broadcast television
- Predecessor: Burnham Broadcasting
- Founded: March 1994; 32 years ago
- Defunct: March 1996; 30 years ago
- Fate: Acquired by Silver King Broadcasting
- Headquarters: United States
- Owners: Fox Broadcasting Company; Savoy Pictures

SF Broadcasting was an American media company that owned and operated four television stations; the company operated from its founding March 1994, four months before its purchased stations owned by Burnham Broadcasting, until its merger with Silver King Broadcasting in 1996.

== History ==
SF Broadcasting was founded in March 1994, it was created as a joint venture between the Fox Broadcasting Company television network, which served as minority owner, and majority owner Savoy Pictures, a minority-owned communications firm. The initial capital of US$100 million was supplied with $58 million from Fox, $41 million from Savoy, and $1 million from Savoy Pictures chairmen Victor A. Kaufman and Lewis J. Korman, who held all the voting stock (had Fox owned any voting stock, the Federal Communications Commission (FCC) would have been considered its then-parent company News Corporation to be the owner of the stations purchased by SF, counting them against the Commission's ownership rules); instead, Savoy Pictures chairmen Victor A. Kaufman and Lewis J. Korman held all the stock.

SF Broadcasting acquired WLUK-TV in Green Bay, Wisconsin on July 29, 1994 for $38 million; this was followed by the purchase of Burnham's three other stations – WALA-TV in Mobile, Alabama, WVUE-TV in New Orleans and KHON-TV in Honolulu – almost one month later on August 25 for $229 million. Burnham-owned ABC affiliate KBAK-TV in Bakersfield, California (now a CBS affiliate) was excluded from the deal and was instead spun off by Burnham to Westwind Communications, a company that was founded by several former Burnham executives.

All of the stations acquired by SF Broadcasting had been affiliated with NBC, with the exception of WVUE, which was affiliated with ABC. As a result of Fox's interest in the stations, all four switched their affiliations to Fox; around this time, in the wake of the network's acquisition of broadcast rights to National Football Conference television package from the National Football League, Fox sought to upgrade its affiliates in major markets with an NFC franchise. The affiliation deal that resulted from the purchase gave Fox upgrades for the home markets of the Green Bay Packers (in the home market of WLUK) and the New Orleans Saints (in the home market of WVUE), giving Fox VHF affiliates in eleven of the fifteen markets with a team in the NFC. The purchase was challenged by NBC, which filed a petition with the Federal Communications Commission on September 23, 1994, alleging that News Corporation had improperly set up a shell corporation to circumvent FCC limits on the amount of capital that a foreign company is allowed to invest in an American television station in order to gain control of the network's Green Bay affiliate WLUK. NBC withdrew its petition against the SF Broadcasting acquisition on February 17, 1995.

On November 28, 1995, Silver King Communications (owned by former Fox executive Barry Diller) announced that it would acquire Savoy Pictures; at the time of the purchase, the majority of Silver King's existing stations had been affiliated with the Home Shopping Network (both Silver King and HSN were then owned by USA Networks). The sale of the stations to Silver King received federal approval in March 1996, with its other assets being merged into the company in November 1996. Silver King, which eventually became USA Broadcasting, later sold them to Emmis Communications in 2000. In 2004, Emmis put up its television stations for sale in order to concentrate on its radio stations. All of the stations were sold to different owners: WALA and WLUK were sold to the LIN TV Corporation; KHON was sold to the Montecito Broadcast Group, which was later acquired by New Vision Television and then by LIN Media in 2012; and WVUE, after its sale was delayed for three years as a result of Hurricane Katrina's effects on New Orleans, was sold to the Louisiana Media Company (a local firm owned by New Orleans Saints owner Tom Benson); then it was resold again in 2017 to Raycom Media after operating the outlet through a shared services agreement four years prior, under Benson's ownership. When LIN Media merged with Media General in 2014, WALA and WLUK were respectively sold to the Meredith Corporation and Sinclair Broadcast Group to resolve ownership conflicts with existing Media General stations in the Mobile and Green Bay markets. Media General was absorbed into Nexstar Media Group in 2017. Only two of the four former SF stations are under common ownership; WALA and WVUE are now owned by Gray Television, after it merged with Raycom and Meredith in 2019 and 2021 respectively.

== Former stations ==
Stations are arranged alphabetically by state and by city of license.

City of license / Market	Station	Channel TV (RF)	Years of ownership	Current status
Mobile, Alabama - Pensacola, Florida	WALA-TV	10 (9)	1995–1996	Fox affiliate owned by Gray Media
Honolulu, Hawaii	KHON-TV	2 (8)	1995–1996	Fox affiliate owned by Nexstar Media Group
Hilo, Hawaii	KHAW-TV (Satellite of KHON-TV)	11 (11)	1995–1996	Fox affiliate owned by Nexstar Media Group
Wailuku, Hawaii	KAII-TV (Satellite of KHON-TV)	7 (7)	1995–1996	Fox affiliate owned by Nexstar Media Group
New Orleans, Louisiana	WVUE-TV	8 (29)	1995–1996	Fox affiliate owned by Gray Media
Green Bay, Wisconsin	WLUK-TV	11 (11)	1995–1996	Fox affiliate owned by Sinclair Broadcast Group
