= KBFX-CD =

Television station in Bakersfield, California

- Bakersfield, California; United States
- Channels: Digital: 29 (UHF); Virtual: 58
- Branding: Fox 58; Eyewitness News

Programming
- Affiliations: 58.1: Fox; for others, see § Subchannels

Ownership
- Owner: Sinclair Broadcast Group; (Sinclair Bakersfield Licensee, LLC)
- Sister stations: KBAK-TV

History
- Founded: August 23, 1989
- First air date: November 1, 1990
- Former call signs: K58DJ (1989–1995); KMPH-LP (1995–1998); KBFX-LP (1998–2005); KBFX-CA (2005–2011)
- Former channel number: Analog: 58 (UHF, 1989–2010)
- Call sign meaning: Bakersfield Fox

Technical information
- Licensing authority: FCC
- Facility ID: 51501
- Class: CD
- ERP: 15 kW
- HAAT: 1,113.2 m (3,652 ft)
- Transmitter coordinates: 35°27′10.8″N 118°35′28.3″W
- Translator(s): KBAK-TV 58.2 Bakersfield

Links
- Public license information: Public file; LMS
- Website: bakersfieldnow.com

KBFX-CD (channel 58) is a low-power, Class A television station in Bakersfield, California, United States, affiliated with the Fox network. It is owned by Sinclair Broadcast Group alongside CBS affiliate KBAK-TV (channel 29). The two stations share studios on Westwind Drive west of Downtown Bakersfield; KBFX's transmitter is located atop Breckenridge Mountain.

In addition to its own digital signal, KBFX-CD is simulcast in high definition on KBAK's second digital subchannel (58.2) from the same transmitter site.

== History ==
KBFX signed on November 1, 1990, as K58DJ, a low-powered relay translator of KMPH, Fresno's Fox affiliate. It changed its call letters to KMPH-LP in 1995. Later, the Fox network wanted to include a new separate affiliate station for the Bakersfield market; as a result, in 1998, channel 58 was relaunched as KBFX-LP. Among the features on the new station was a KBAK-produced 10 p.m. newscast, Fox 58 News @ 10. It was so successful that KBAK's then-owner Westwind Communications bought the station in 2005 from KMPH's owners, Pappas Telecasting.

On August 6, 2007, Westwind Communications announced the sale of KBAK and KBFX-CA to Fisher Communications of Seattle, with the sale closing on January 1, 2008.

KBFX-CD's logo from 2010 to 2015, during a period in which the station branded simply with its call letters

On February 28, 2010, Bright House Networks (now Spectrum) announced that KBFX would be carried in Tehachapi on cable channel 6.

In January 2011, KBFX began airing its local news in high definition.

Fisher Communications announced on April 11, 2013, that it would be acquired by Sinclair Broadcast Group, pending Federal Communications Commission (FCC) approval. The deal was completed on August 8, 2013. On October 3, 2013, Sinclair announced the completion of the sale of four stations owned by Titan TV Broadcast Group, including KMPH, which reunites KBFX as sister-stations for the first time in eight years.

KBFX is the only Bakersfield television station to never change its affiliation, having always been a Fox affiliate.

== Technical information ==
=== Subchannels ===
The station's signal is multiplexed:

Subchannels of KBFX-CD
Channel	Res.	Short name	Programming
29.2 (Note: Per ATSC standards, a station on channel X must map to channel Y if another station on channel Y maps to channel X; channel 58.2 (an HD simulcast of 58.1) already exists on KBAK.)	480i	ROAR	Roar (4:3)
58.1	720p	FOX58	Fox
58.3	480i	Comet	Comet
58.4	480i	TheNest	The Nest

The analog signal went off the air in August 2010. KBFX just recently launched their new digital transmitter on RF channel 29. This signal carried This TV on its subchannel, which maps to virtual channel 29-2.

The station's 29.2 subchannel was an initial affiliate of the American Sports Network with its first broadcast on August 30, 2014.
