= Mobile Wolf Woman =

Legendary creature

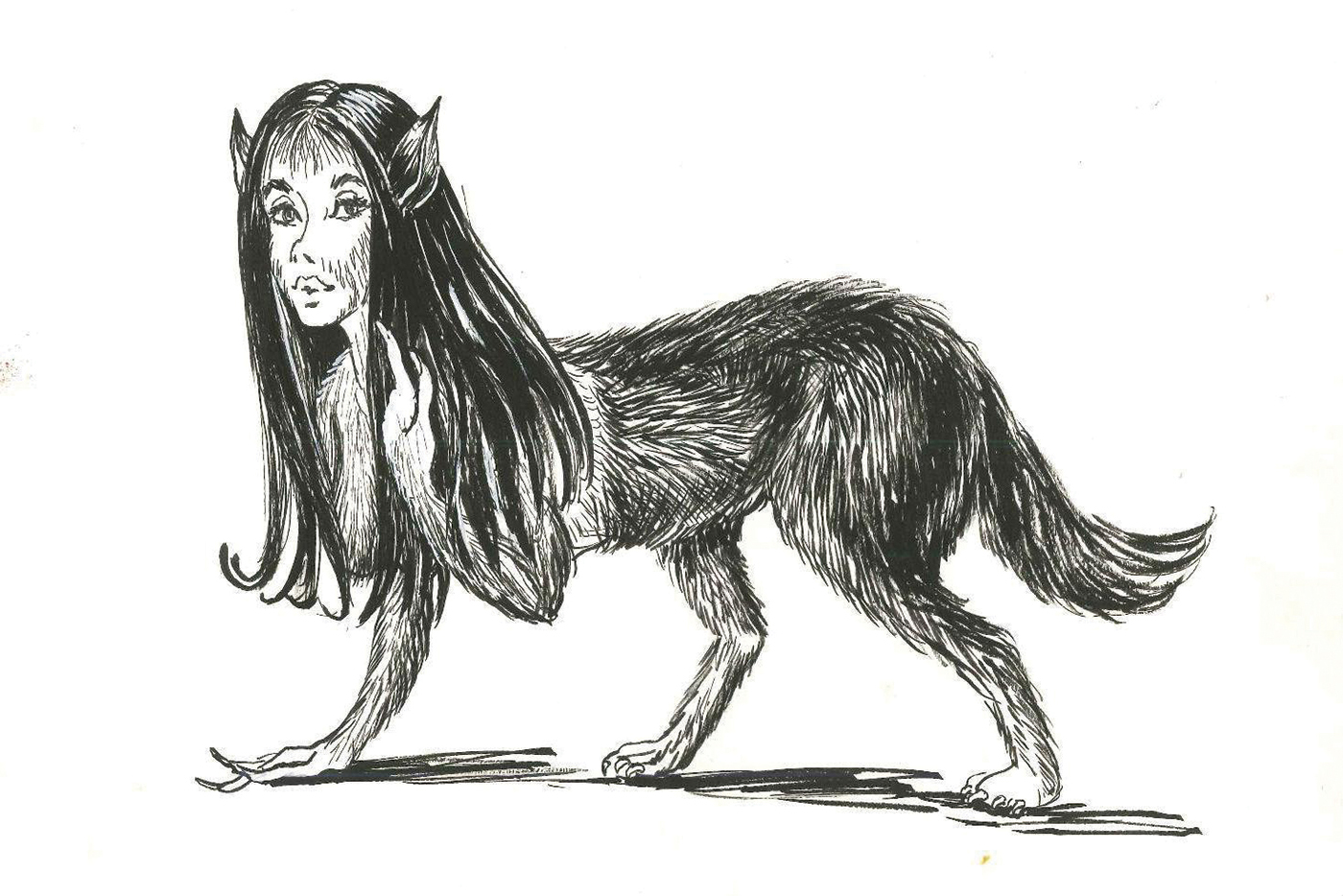
- An illustration of the Mobile Wolf Woman published in the Mobile Press

Origin
- First attested: April 1, 1971
- Country: United States
- Region: Mobile, Alabama

The Mobile Wolf Woman is a legendary creature reported to live in Mobile, Alabama, United States. Beginning on April 1, 1971, residents of Mobile began making calls to the Mobile Press (also called the Press-Register) newspaper reporting that they had seen a creature with the body of a wolf and the head of a woman. The Mobile Press published a story on the creature on April 8, reporting that they had received over 50 calls about it. It has since been suggested that the creature may have been an April Fools' Day prank or just a particularly long-haired dog.

== History ==
On April 1, 1971, multiple residents of Mobile, Alabama, made calls to the Mobile Press newspaper claiming that they had seen a mysterious creature on Davis Avenue and in the Plateau neighborhood. They had received over 50 calls, and residents were reportedly very frightened by the creature. Witnessed described the creature as "pretty and hairy" and that "the top half was a woman and the bottom was a wolf". Mobile police also received calls about the creature and investigated it but did not make any official comments on the case. The paper published their story on the creature on April 8. The story claimed that the fear felt by callers was genuine, and that several children were afraid to leave their homes. The story included an illustration of the creature by an unnamed staff member. The newspaper article noted that the calls were all secondary reports and that none of the callers had directly seen the creature.

The Press-Register received calls about the creature for approximately a week. Within days, reported sightings stopped, and the creature has never been seen since. There has been speculation about the true identity of the creature, including claims that it was a German Shepherd that was put in a wig as an April Fools' Day prank or that it was a long-haired Afghan Hound. Don Comeaux, director of the Mobile Exploreum Science Center, noted in 2023 that Mobile, Alabama, has a long history of urban legends, ghost stories, and legendary creatures.

== See also ==
- Crichton Leprechaun
