= Comet (TV network) =

American digital multicast television network

- Type: Digital broadcast TV network (science fiction)
- Country: United States
- Broadcast area: Nationwide, via Dish Network, OTA digital TV (coverage: 82%), webcasting & OTT TV
- Headquarters: Hunt Valley, Maryland

Programming
- Language: English
- Picture format: 1080i (HDTV); 480i (SDTV, widescreen) (downgraded to letterboxed 4:3 on some over-the-air affiliates)

Ownership
- Owner: Sinclair Broadcast Group
- Parent: Sinclair Television Group
- Key people: David Amy (vice chairman, Sinclair Broadcast Group)
- Sister channels: Charge!; Roar; Tennis Channel; The Nest

History
- Founded: June 29, 2015; 11 years ago
- Launched: October 31, 2015; 11 years ago

Links
- Webcast: Watch live
- Website: comettv.com

Availability

Terrestrial
- List of Comet affiliates

Streaming media
- Service(s): FuboTV, Sling TV, YouTube TV Hulu + Live TV

Comet is an American digital broadcast television network owned by the Sinclair Television Group subsidiary of the Sinclair Broadcast Group that focuses on science fiction, supernatural, horror, adventure and fantasy programming. The network was originally launched on October 31, 2015, as a joint venture with Metro-Goldwyn-Mayer, with much of its programming sourced from MGM's film and television library.

In addition to its broadcast affiliates, Comet is also available via Apple TV, FuboTV, YouTubeTV, Hulu + Live TV, Sling TV, and Dish Network.

== History ==
=== Background ===
Comet logo from 2015–2020

On June 29, 2015, Metro-Goldwyn-Mayer and the Sinclair Broadcast Group founded the broadcasting and programming subsidiary Sinclair Television Group, Inc., and announced an expected 4th quarter launch of a then-unnamed science fiction network. Sinclair chief operating officer David Amy, in announcing the partnership, noted that MGM "has an extensive collection of science fiction films and television movies that appeal to a vast audience who will now be able to access that content through broadcast television". Sinclair tapped its television stations in many of the 79 markets where the company owned or operated a broadcasting property at the time of the announcement to serve as the network's initial charter affiliates. On August 5, 2015, in its financial report for the second fiscal quarter, Sinclair Broadcast Group announced that the new network would be named Comet.

Comet is the first national multicasting venture by Sinclair, which aimed to develop content for the 162 television stations it ran at the time (many of which are operated through management outsourcing agreements with stations that Sinclair owns outright). The network operates in a similar fashion to a shared services agreement that is usually formed between two local TV stations, but in this case between a programmer-distributor and owner & station group. The network is offered on barter basis with the network with nine minutes of ad and the affiliate with five per hour with the ability to revenue share if MGM sells the local portion of the ads on behalf of the station. The network does not rely on the rating system, as most diginets do, using direct-response commercials in determining viewership.

=== Launch ===
The network formally launched on October 31, 2015 at 7AM (ET) with an airing of Johnny Sokko and His Flying Robot. The 1984 sci-fi/action film The Terminator and the 1979 sci-fi-themed James Bond film Moonraker were its premiere night programming.

As of 2020, along with sibling network Charge!, Comet is now owned-and-operated by Sinclair as MGM sold their operation stake in the two networks.

== Programming ==
Comet currently provides up to 19 hours of programming to its owned-and-operated and affiliated stations on weekdays from 9:00 a.m. to 4:00 a.m. Eastern Time and weekends from 11:00 a.m. to 4:00 a.m. Eastern Time. Beginning Monday, August 26, 2024, Comet began airing Buffy the Vampire Slayer daily at 3:00 a.m. Eastern Time. Beginning in June 2025 (since they no longer have the rights to Buffy), they began airing movies at 2:00 a.m. Eastern Time, still maintaining the same amount of programming as before. The remaining vacated hours are occupied by paid programming.

Comet draws from the extensive library of films and television programming owned by Metro-Goldwyn-Mayer and subsidiary United Artists, carrying more than 1,500 hours worth of sci-fi programming from the studio.

The network's programming consists of content from science fiction, horror, fantasy and other related genres, with a mix of theatrically released feature films and select off-network series from the 1960s to the 2000s (such as The Ray Bradbury Theater and the 1990s revival of The Outer Limits). This gives Comet a more demographically targeted format than on competitive networks such as MeTV, Heroes & Icons, Antenna TV and Catchy Comedy, which maintain a general entertainment programming format. Along with its sister terrestrial television networks, Comet airs infomercials at late night and early morning.

In May 2026, Comet started broadcasting the National Wrestling Alliance's weekly show NWA Powerrr.

=== Current programming ===
- The X-Files
- Stargate SG-1
- Xena: Warrior Princess
- Grimm
- The Outer Limits
- Tales from the Darkside
- Friday the 13th: The Series
- The Librarians
- The Outpost

=== Former programming ===
- The Ray Bradbury Theater
- Andromeda
- Dead Like Me
- Mystery Science Theater 3000
- Farscape
- Quantum Leap
- Johnny Sokko and His Flying Robot
- Babylon 5
- Night Gallery
- Men into Space
- The Outer Limits (1963–1965 series)
- Poltergeist: The Legacy
- Sliders
- Stargate Atlantis
- Stargate Universe
- Buffy the Vampire Slayer
- Battlestar Galactica
- Ring of Honor Wrestling

== Affiliates ==
In October 2015, for its debut, Comet had affiliation agreements with television stations covering 60% of the United States (or 150,891,489 households with at least one television set). By July 2016, the network had grown to 72 markets covering 72% of U.S. TV households.

Sinclair Broadcast Group initially planned to launch Comet on select television stations owned by the company (including those operated through outsourcing agreements with partner companies Deerfield Media, Howard Stirk Holdings, and Cunningham Broadcasting). The network also intended to seek carriage on the digital subchannels of television stations owned by other broadcasting companies. Titan Broadcast Management and Tribune Broadcasting were the first outside Sinclair operated stations to affiliate some of their stations with Comet.

Due to its co-ownership by Sinclair, some of the group's stations (as well as others not run by Sinclair, Deerfield, Howard Stirk, or Cunningham that are affiliated with the syndication service) may elect to pre-empt certain afternoon or evening programs within the national Comet schedule to carry telecasts from the Sinclair-owned American Sports Network. This capacity is currently utilized by Sinclair for many of its Fox, The CW and MyNetworkTV and other affiliated subchannels as an alternate outlet to air events not being carried by the affiliate's main channel.

== Availability ==
In early March 2017, the network started OTT streaming as a Roku channel and on Apple TV.

Sony's defunct service, PlayStation Vue add the network to its Core package in late 2018.

The network was a launch channel of the then Sinclair-owned streaming service, Stirr, in January 2019, and was added to Sling TV the following month on February 20, 2019.

== See also ==
- Syfy – a similar-themed American cable channel owned by Versant, featuring science fiction, fantasy, drama and horror genre programming
- CTV Sci-Fi Channel – a similarly formatted cable and satellite channel in Canada, owned by Bell Media
