= WNGL =

Radio station in Mobile, Alabama

- Mobile, Alabama; United States
- Frequency: 1410 kHz
- Branding: Archangel Radio

Programming
- Format: Catholic

Ownership
- Owner: Archangel Communications, Inc.

History
- First air date: February 7, 1930 (as WODX)
- Former call signs: WODX (1930–1933); WALA (1933–1963); WUNI (1963–1984); WMML (1984–1991); WLVV (1991–2009)
- Call sign meaning: Angel

Technical information
- Licensing authority: FCC
- Facility ID: 854
- Class: B
- Power: 5,000 watts (day); 4,600 watts (night)
- Transmitter coordinates: 30°42′24″N 88°3′43″W
- Translator: 94.5 W233CX (Mobile)

Links
- Public license information: Public file; LMS
- Webcast: Listen live
- Website: archangelradio.com

WNGL (1410 AM) is a radio station licensed to serve Mobile, Alabama, United States. Since September 2009, the station has been owned by Fairhope-based Archangel Communications, Inc.

== Programming ==
WNGL broadcasts a Catholic radio format to the Mobile metropolitan area. The station primarily airs programming from EWTN Global Catholic Radio and also broadcasts a local live hour program weekdays mornings, along with McGill–Toolen Catholic High School football games.

== History ==
=== The beginning ===
The oldest radio station in Mobile, Alabama, WODX first broadcast from the Battle House Hotel in downtown Mobile on February 7, 1930. Owned by W.O. Pape's Pape Broadcasting Company, the station changed its call sign to WALA in 1933. The book Alabama's First Broadcast Stations by Harry Butler says the calls WALA once stood for "We Are Loyal Alabamians".

January 1953 saw the launch of co-owned NBC-affiliated television station WALA-TV (channel 10) in Mobile and the start of a new era for the AM radio station. A shift by the Pape family in January 1956 saw WALA transferred to a new company called Pape Television Company.

=== The country era ===
In 1963 the ownership of the radio and television stations was split and the AM station's call sign was changed to WUNI. The call sign was intended to sound out the phrase "You and I". The re-christened radio station was acquired by a new company called WUNI Inc. on December 3, 1964. It was with this ownership change that WUNI became the first full-time country music radio station in Mobile. The station was sold again, this time to the similarly named Radio Station WUNI Inc. on August 1, 1976.

In October 1983, Radio Station WUNI, Inc., agreed to sell the station to country music legend Mel Tillis through his Tillis Communications, Inc. The deal was approved by the Federal Communications Commission (FCC) on December 2, 1983. Tillis had the FCC assign new call letters WMML on January 3, 1984. As with sister station KMML in Amarillo, Texas, the new callsign stood for "M-M-Mel Tillis" as a play on Mel's famous stutter. WMML continued to air the country music format it had adopted in 1964.

=== R&B and religion ===
Tillis exited the radio business in 1985 and WMML was sold to Bridgeway Communications, Inc., owned by St. Louis Media Hall of Fame inductee Doug Eason. Bridgeway changed the format to urban-oriented rap music which did well in the ratings but proved a tough sell to area advertisers. In December 1989, station owner Bridgeway Communications, Inc., faced financial difficulties and the license for this station was involuntarily transferred to Bridgeway Communications, Inc., Debtor-In-Possession. The transfer was approved by the FCC on December 11, 1989. In January 1990, Bridgeway Communications, Inc., Debtor-In-Possession gained approval to sell this station to Lonnie M. Tillis. The deal was approved by the FCC on April 2, 1990, and the transaction was consummated on May 30, 1990.

In March 1991, Lonnie M. Tillis made a deal to sell WMML to Albert L. Crain. The deal was approved by the FCC on April 26, 1991, and the transaction was consummated on June 17, 1991. The new owner had the FCC change the station's legal callsign to WLVV on June 28, 1991. The station aired religious programming branded as "Love Radio".

On February 19, 1997, station owner Albert L. Crain died and on April 21, 1997, Joy Crain Johns applied to the FCC to have the license legally transferred to the Estate of Albert L. Crain. The transfer was approved by the FCC on May 5, 1997, and the transaction was completed on May 9, 1997.

In February 1999, the Estate of Albert L. Crain reached an agreement to sell this station to WLVV, Inc., based in Baytown, Texas, for a reported sale price of $263,750. The deal was approved by the FCC on April 14, 1999, and the transaction was consummated on June 23, 1999. The station switched to a black gospel music format branded as Victory 1410 under the slogan "The Voice of Victory". The station's transmitter site and broadcast tower were severely damaged by Hurricane Katrina, and it operated under special temporary authority beginning in September 2005 while repairs and new construction brought the broadcaster back to regular licensed operation.

== WNGL today ==
In July 2009, WLVV, Inc., reached an agreement to sell this station to Archangel Communications, Inc., of Fairhope, Alabama. The deal, valued at $125,000, was accepted for filing by the FCC on August 3, 2009, approved by the Commission on September 18, 2009, and the transaction was consummated on September 29, 2009. The new owners flipped to a Catholic radio format. They had the station's call sign changed to WNGL on October 8, 2009.
