= Leprecon =

Leprecon may refer to:

- LepreCon, science fiction convention held annually in Phoenix, Arizona, United States
- LEPrecon, Lower Elements Police reconnaissance squad in the fictional Artemis Fowl series

== See also ==
- Leprechaun, a creature in Irish mythology
