= Crichton Leprechaun =

Supposed leprechaun in Mobile, Alabama

Coordinates: 30.6958239°N 88.1102674°W

- The "amateur sketch" of the purported Crichton Leprechaun

Creature information
- Grouping: Leprechaun

Origin
- First attested: March 14, 2006
- Country: United States
- Region: Mobile, Alabama

The Crichton Leprechaun (also the Mobile Leprechaun, Alabama Leprechaun) is a supposed leprechaun reported to have been spotted in a tree in Crichton, a neighborhood of Mobile, Alabama, following a 2006 news report filed at local NBC affiliate WPMI-TV. The video was posted to YouTube on Saint Patrick's Day 2006 and became one of the first YouTube viral videos and was referenced in mainstream media. As of 2023, the video has over 28 million views.

Since then the leprechaun has become an icon of the local community of Crichton. In 2023, the sign shop Sign Source started printing out cardboard cutouts of the Crichton Leprechaun and selling them, apparently with great success. An eight-foot-tall version of the Crichton Leprechaun cutout is displayed outside of their store.

== Original WPMI-TV report ==
The video was shot in the Mobile neighborhood of Crichton, located near Toulminville. The community is divided by Spring Hill Avenue into North Crichton and South Crichton, bounded generally by Mobile Street, Dauphin Street and Interstate 65. The leprechaun was purported to be seen in a tree on Le Cren Street near Bay Shore Avenue.

On March 14, 2006, local NBC affiliate WPMI-TV was alerted to crowds gathering in Crichton, and dispatched reporter Brian Johnson to investigate. Johnson had previously received numerous calls about possible leprechaun sightings and questions about it from friends at a barbershop and his church. "Things sort of snowballed" when the crew arrived, anchor Scott Walker later recalled, with multiple people claiming to have seen a leprechaun in a tree. Crichton resident Nina Thomas-Brown submitted a crudely drawn sketch of the supposed leprechaun.

Among those who were interviewed was a woman who opined that instead of a leprechaun, "[it] could be a crackhead who got hold of the wrong stuff." Another interviewee, Demarco Morrissette, claimed Irish ancestry and showed off a "special leprechaun flute," that he claimed was thousands of years old. Morrissette became known as the "Flute Man" due to his appearance in the report. "I actually saw what was sketched on paper," said Johnson at the time. "Some people say it is a shadow from some of the branches being too close and that there is moss on the tree that could explain it. Certainly I don't believe it's a leprechaun!"

The piece was aired twice, once on the nightly newscast and again on WPMI's morning newscast. That version, introduced by anchors Scott Walker and Nikole Patrick, was the broadcast that went viral.

== Virality and reception ==
The video was posted to YouTube on March 17, 2006 and soon became a viral sensation, attracting millions of views.

The report received attention from MSNBC, radio personality Howard Stern and received a piece in The New York Times, in which columnist Virginia Heffernan called the clip "a local Alabama news segment that seems too hilarious to be real." Reporter Brian Johnson was interviewed by radio stations in Dallas and Los Angeles following the report. Political commentator Bill O'Reilly of Fox News's The O'Reilly Factor debated whether or not the video perpetuated racial stereotypes. The video was also lampooned on Comedy Central's The Daily Show, Key and Peele, and South Park.

Tosh.0 featured the clip in a "Web Investigation" segment in 2011, with host Daniel Tosh visiting Crichton and interviewing those involved with the video. Tosh referred to the clip as "the Gone with the Wind of Internet videos. It's old. It's famous. And it makes the South look terrible." Many quotes and elements of the video, most notably the alleged leprechaun sketch, were printed on T-shirts, mousepads and other merchandise. WPMI-TV later auctioned off the leprechaun sketch for $1,100 on eBay, with the proceeds benefiting the American Cancer Society's Relay for Life.

The clip continues to receive media attention annually on St. Patrick's Day. In 2011, anchor Scott Walker wrote about the report: "It's fun to be part of something that's talked about so much for so long, although some of my co-workers are probably really tired of it. But I never get tired of hearing about it."

The fourth episode of the first season of Key and Peele, which aired on February 21, 2012, featured a sketch inspired by the news report on the Crichton Leprechaun. The sketch, a "nearly shot-for-shot remake of the original [report]", depicted a news crew inciting a "pegasus sighting" in a Black neighborhood. The Huffington Post praised the sketch, writing that "we think you'll agree it hits on most of the best moments in the original video."

The Bob and Dan Show on KTCK 1310 The Ticket in Dallas conducted a field investigation in 2014, interviewing locals about their memories of the incident. Numerous witnesses identified the Crichton Leprechaun as a local resident named "Midget Sean," a person of short stature. The interviewers met the man, who recounted the story as a prank played on the local community, in which he dressed in a leprechaun suit and climbed a tree while his friends alerted others about a leprechaun sighting.

In 2023, the National Leprechaun Museum in Dublin praised the Crichton Leprechaun news report as "one of the most significant pieces of documentary film over the last 20 years", announcing that they would certify the Crichton sighting as a "genuine" leprechaun sighting.

== See also ==
- Mobile Wolf Woman
- Little people (mythology) – Mythological humanoid creatures of small stature
- Leprechaun: In the Hood
