= Crichton, Alabama =

Neighborhood in Mobile, Alabama, US

Crichton
- Neighborhood
- Interactive map of Crichton
- Coordinates: 30°42′23″N 88°06′22″W
- Country: United States
- State: Alabama
- County: Mobile
- City: Mobile

Area
  - Land: 1.292 sq mi (3.35 km^{2})

Population (2019)
  - Total: 4,182
  - Density: 3,237/sq mi (1,250/km^{2})

Crichton is a neighborhood in Mobile, Alabama consisting of North Crichton and South Crichton.

== Population ==
At a 2019 Census, Crichton had a population of 4,182, with 2,179 from North Crichton and 2,003 from South Crichton.

== History ==
Crichton is the site of the alleged Crichton Leprechaun sighting in 2006. The sighting became a significant part of Crichton's culture, and cardboard cutouts depicting the leprechaun are produced in the neighborhood.
