= KBAK-TV =

Television station in Bakersfield, California

- Bakersfield, California; United States
- Channels: Digital: 33 (UHF); Virtual: 29
- Branding: KBAK CBS; Eyewitness News

Programming
- Affiliations: 29.1: CBS; 58.2: Fox; for others, see § Subchannels

Ownership
- Owner: Sinclair Broadcast Group; (Sinclair Bakersfield Licensee, LLC)
- Sister stations: KBFX-CD

History
- First air date: August 21, 1953
- Former call signs: KAFY-TV (1953–1954)
- Former channel number: Analog: 29 (UHF, 1953–2009)
- Former affiliations: ABC (1974–1996)
- Call sign meaning: Bakersfield

Technical information
- Licensing authority: FCC
- Facility ID: 4148
- ERP: 110 kW
- HAAT: 1,128 m (3,701 ft)
- Transmitter coordinates: 35°27′10.8″N 118°35′28.3″W

Links
- Public license information: Public file; LMS
- Website: bakersfieldnow.com

KBAK-TV (channel 29) is a television station in Bakersfield, California, United States, affiliated with CBS. It is owned by Sinclair Broadcast Group alongside low-power, Class A Fox affiliate KBFX-CD (channel 58). The two stations share studios on Westwind Drive west of Downtown Bakersfield; KBAK-TV's transmitter is located atop Breckenridge Mountain.

== History ==
The station signed on the air on August 21, 1953, as KAFY-TV. It was originally owned by Sheldon Anderson along with KAFY radio (550 AM, now 1100 AM). The station originally operated from studios located on Chester Avenue in Bakersfield. It is Bakersfield's oldest television station; KERO-TV (then on channel 10) followed a month later. Four months later, Anderson sold the station to the Chronicle Publishing Company of San Francisco. KAFY-TV was initially an affiliate of the Dumont television network, later becoming a primary CBS affiliate, sharing ABC programming with KERO-TV until KLYD-TV (channel 17, now KGET-TV) signed on in 1959.

In February 1954, shortly after becoming a full CBS affiliate, channel 29 changed its calls to the current KBAK-TV. The Chronicle sold the station to Reeves Telecom in 1960. As a CBS and later ABC affiliate, KBAK aired all of each network's color programs in color, and went to full color in 1967. In 1974, KBAK swapped affiliations with channel 17, then known as KJTV, and became an ABC affiliate.

In 1964, Reeves sold KBAK to Chicago-based Harriscope Broadcasting, which also owned WSNS in Chicago (now a Telemundo O&O) and a partial stake in KRQE in Albuquerque (now owned by Nexstar Media Group). In the late 1980s, KBAK started signing off only on Fridays and Saturdays, which, as a CBS affiliate, it continued to do until May 2008, when the sign-offs on KBAK and KBFX were discontinued and were replaced by a simulcast of the Kern Weather Channel, which is also available on digital cable systems in the Bakersfield area.

In 1986, Harriscope sold KBAK to Burnham Broadcasting, which also owned KHON-TV in Honolulu and would later acquire WVUE in New Orleans, WALA-TV in Mobile, Alabama, and WLUK in Green Bay, Wisconsin. In 1995, Burnham sold most of its stations to SF Broadcasting, a joint venture between Fox and Savoy Pictures, but KBAK was not included in the sale to SF Broadcasting, and was instead spun off to Westwind Communications, a locally based company linked to former Burnham executives.

After McGraw-Hill (then-owner of KERO-TV) learned in November 1994 that its KMGH-TV in Denver would be losing its CBS affiliation to KCNC-TV, it signed a groupwide affiliation deal which called for all of its stations, including KMGH-TV and KERO-TV, to become ABC affiliates. KBAK rejoined CBS on March 4, 1996, after KERO-TV's affiliation contract with CBS expired.

On August 6, 2007, Westwind Communications announced the sale of KBAK and KBFX-CA to Fisher Communications of Seattle. The deal closed on January 1, 2008. This marked a re-entry into the Central Valley for Fisher, who had previously bought and sold KJEO (now KGPE) in Fresno in the late 1990s.

In mid May 2010, KBAK became the first station in Bakersfield to begin broadcasting local newscasts in 16:9 widescreen standard definition. Then on January 16, 2011, KBAK took it one step further to become the first station in Bakersfield to launch local news in true high definition. The KBFX shows were included in the upgrade to HD; however, until recently, they were presented in downconverted standard definition widescreen on KBAK-DT2 (which serves as a full-power companion to KBFX's low-power Class A digital terrestrial signal).

KBAK-TV, KBFX, and Fisher Communications' other holdings were sold to Sinclair Broadcast Group in a transaction announced on April 10, 2013. The deal was completed on August 8, 2013. The transaction marked a re-entry into California for Sinclair since it sold off its Sacramento station KOVR to CBS at the end of April 2005.

== Technical information ==
=== Subchannels ===
The station's signal is multiplexed:

Subchannels of KBAK-TV
Channel	Res.	Short name	Programming
29.1	1080i	KBAK	CBS
29.3	480i	Charge!	Charge!
29.4	480i	TCN	True Crime Network
58.2	720p	FOX58	Fox (KBFX-CD)

Simulcast of subchannels of another station

=== Analog-to-digital conversion ===
KBAK-TV ended regular programming on its analog signal, over UHF channel 29, on June 12, 2009, the official date on which full-power television stations in the United States transitioned from analog to digital broadcasts under federal mandate. The station's digital signal remained on its pre-transition UHF channel 33, using virtual channel 29.
