= Leprechaun (video game) =

1982 video game

- Developer(s): Pacific Polytechnical
- Publisher(s): Enter-Tech; Game Plan (Pot of Gold)
- Platform(s): Arcade
- Release: 1982
- Genre(s): Action
- Mode(s): Single-player, multiplayer

Leprechaun is an arcade video game manufactured by Enter-Tech in 1982. It was licensed from Tong Electronic. Leprechaun was designed for children, with a low difficulty and a smaller cabinet, released in the Moppet Video line. Game Plan manufactured a version using a standard arcade cabinet as Pot of Gold.

== Gameplay ==
The player controls a sleuth running through a forest, trying to get a Leprechaun's pot of gold. The pot of gold is randomly placed on the screen. When the pot of gold is touched, the player is taken to the next level. The Leprechaun chases the sleuth through the forest, trying to catch him. If he is caught the player loses a life and starts over from the beginning of the level. After all lives are lost, the game ends. Should the Leprechaun reach the pot of gold first, it is then relocated to another place on the screen. By touching the trees, the player's score increases, as does the value of the pot of gold. Every time the Leprechaun touches a tree, the pot's value decreases though the player's score remains the same. After each level and after every 30 seconds the Leprechaun's speed increases.
