= Frank Brown Songwriters Festival =

The Frank Brown Songwriters Festival is a music festival held annually in the Florida and Alabama Gulf Coast region, US.

== History ==
The Frank Brown International Songwriters Festival was founded in 1984 by Joe Gilchrist to honor the songwriters and stories behind original music. Gilchrist was a co-founder of the Flora-Bama Lounge and named the Songwriters Festival as a tribute to the venue's long-term night watchman, Frank Brown.

The Frank Brown International Songwriters' Festival is held on an annual basis every November. Performances are held across multiple venues along the Florida and Alabama Gulf Coast regions, including Orange Beach, Gulf Shores, Perdido Key and Pensacola, anchored by the Flora-Bama Lounge as a key venue.

The festival schedule features both songwriters and artist-songwriters. Prominent among those featured in the schedule of recent festivals include Buddy Cannon, Rodney Clawson, Dean Dillon, Bob DiPiero, Wyatt Durrette, Hillary Lindsey, Gary Nicholson, Eric Paslay, Pam Tillis and The Band Perry.

In 2003, the 501(c)(3) non-profit Frank Brown Foundation for Music was established and in conjunction with the Frank Brown Songwriters Festival, it conducts a schools outreach program in Baldwin County, Cities of Gulf Shores and Orange Beach, AL and Escambia County, FL districts. In 2015, Frank Brown Foundation Board member Peggy Butler established the Larry Butler Memorial Music Award at the University of West Florida.
