= Deerfield Media =

American television broadcast company

Deerfield Media, Inc.
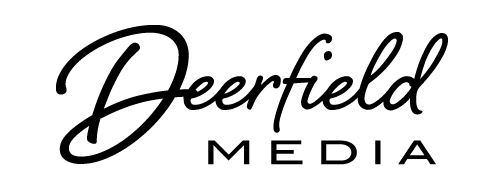
- Type: Private
- Industry: Broadcast media
- Founded: December 1, 2012; 13 years ago; New York City, New York, U.S.
- Founder: Stephen P. Mumblow
- Headquarters: Vail, Colorado, U.S.
- Owner: Stephen P. Mumblow
- Parent: Sinclair Broadcast Group

Deerfield Media, Inc. is a broadcasting company and a shell corporation owned and operated by Stephen P. Mumblow. It was established on December 1, 2012, by the acquisition of several television stations connected to the Sinclair Broadcast Group. Most of its stations are part of duopolies with another Sinclair-owned station, and are operated under local marketing agreements or similar by Sinclair.

As a part of its acquisition of multiple stations from Newport Television in Cincinnati and San Antonio, Sinclair sold WSTR-TV and KMYS (MyNetworkTV and The CW affiliates respectively) to Deerfield, and also gave them an option to purchase WJTC and WPMI at a later date. Deerfield Media also acquired KBTV-TV, a Fox affiliate in Beaumont, Texas, from Nexstar Broadcasting Group, whose operations were assumed by Sinclair's KFDM. Through an option exercised by Sinclair, Deerfield also acquired WUTB, a MyNetworkTV affiliate owned by Fox Television Stations. This purchase created a triopoly between Sinclair's Fox affiliate, WBFF, and CW affiliate, WNUV (owned by Cunningham Broadcasting, and also operated under an LMA by Sinclair). Deerfield also reached a deal to acquire the license assets of WHAM-TV, an ABC affiliate in Rochester, New York, also from Newport Television, and to acquire KAME-TV, the MyNetworkTV affiliate in Reno, Nevada, from Ellis Communications on February 1, 2013, as part of Sinclair's purchase of KRXI-TV from Cox Media Group.

In April 2018, Deerfield Media moved its headquarters from New York City to Park City, Utah.

In November 2022, Deerfield Media laid off all production and office staff at its Park City, Utah location and relocated its headquarters to Vail, Colorado. In March 2025, Deerfield then laid off all production and office staff at its Vail location as it announced its intent not to renew its lease on the studios there and would shut down its station there March 28.

== 2021 FCC fine ==
On July 28, 2021, the Federal Communications Commission (FCC) issued a Forfeiture Order against Deerfield Media related to the lawsuit DirecTV, LLC v. Deerfield Media, Inc., ordering the company to pay 6 fines of $512,228 each, totaling $3,073,368. The order was the result of a lawsuit filed by DirecTV and its parent AT&T alleging that Deerfield Media, along with several other station groups whose stations are managed by Sinclair Broadcast Group, failed to negotiate for retransmission consent in good faith for its stations KBTV, KMYS, WHAM, WJTC, WPMI, and WSTR. The FCC adopted a Memorandum Opinion and Order and Notice of Apparent Liability on September 2, 2020, affirming the lawsuit allegations. The stations affected by the fines were represented in retransmission negotiations by Duane Lammers of Max Retrans.

== Current stations ==
Stations are arranged alphabetically by state and by city of license.

City of license / market	Station	Channel	Owned since	Network affiliation
Pensacola, FL–Mobile, AL	WPMI-TV	15	2012	Roar
Pensacola, FL–Mobile, AL	WJTC	44	2012	Independent
Syracuse, NY	WTVH	5	2026	Roar
Kerrville–San Antonio, TX	KMYS	35	2012	Roar

== Former stations ==
City of license / Market	Station	Channel	Years owned	Current ownership status
Vail, CO	K34QB-D	34	2021–2025	Defunct, license canceled in 2025
Park City, UT	K36PL-D	45	2017–2024	Defunct, license canceled in 2024
Baltimore, MD	WUTB	24	2013–2025	Owned by Sinclair Broadcast Group
Reno, NV	KNSN-TV	21	2013–2025	Owned by Sinclair Broadcast Group
Rochester, NY	WHAM-TV	13	2013–2026	Owned by Sinclair Broadcast Group
Cincinnati, OH	WSTR-TV	64	2012–2025	Owned by Sinclair Broadcast Group
Port Arthur–Beaumont, TX	KBTV-TV	4	2012–2025	Owned by Sinclair Broadcast Group

K36PL (branded as Park City Television) and K34QB (branded as TV8 Vail) were operated directly by Deerfield Media with no involvement from Sinclair Broadcast Group.

== See also ==
- Cunningham Broadcasting
- Howard Stirk Holdings
- Duopoly (broadcasting)
- Mission Broadcasting and Vaughan Media—similar holding companies related to Nexstar Media Group
