= WFNA (TV) =

Television station in Gulf Shores, Alabama

ATSC 3.0 station
- Gulf Shores–Mobile, Alabama; Pensacola–Fort Walton Beach, Florida; United States
- City: Gulf Shores, Alabama
- Channels: Digital: 27 (UHF); Virtual: 55
- Branding: The Gulf Coast CW (general); WKRG News 5 (newscasts)

Programming
- Affiliations: 55.1: The CW; for others, see § Technical information and subchannels

Ownership
- Owner: Nexstar Media Group; (Nexstar Media Inc.)
- Sister stations: WKRG-TV

History
- Founded: August 1, 2000
- First air date: September 2, 2001
- Former call signs: WGMP (2000–2001); WBPG (2001–2009)
- Former channel numbers: Analog: 55 (UHF, 2001–2009); Digital: 25 (UHF, until 2019)
- Former affiliations: The WB (2001–2006)
- Call sign meaning: Florida and Alabama

Technical information
- Licensing authority: FCC
- Facility ID: 83943
- ERP: 1,000 kW
- HAAT: 505.9 m (1,660 ft)
- Transmitter coordinates: 30°41′20.4″N 87°49′50.6″W
- Translator(s): WKRG-TV 5.2 Mobile

Links
- Public license information: Public file; LMS
- Website: www.wkrg.com/gulf-coast-cw

WFNA-TV (channel 55) is a television station licensed to Gulf Shores, Alabama, United States, serving as the CW outlet for southwest Alabama and northwest Florida. It is owned by network parent Nexstar Media Group alongside CBS affiliate WKRG-TV (channel 5). The two stations share studios with several radio stations owned by iHeartMedia on Broadcast Drive in southwest Mobile; WFNA's transmitter is located in unincorporated Baldwin County near Spanish Fort, Alabama.

== History ==
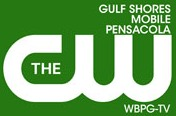
WBPG's first logo as a CW affiliate, introduced in 2006 and used until the station rebranded as WFNA in 2009.

Prior to the station's sign-on, WFNA's call letters were originally planned to be WGMP (standing for "Gulf Shores, Mobile, Pensacola"). The station first signed on the air as WBPG on September 2, 2001; it replaced WFGX (channel 35) as the area's WB affiliate after the station reverted to independent status two days earlier on August 31. The station was originally owned by Pegasus Broadcasting. At the time, WFGX's signal was all but unviewable over-the-air on the Alabama side of the market, but WBPG's signal decently covered the entire market.

In 2003, Emmis Communications purchased the station, which created a duopoly with Fox affiliate WALA-TV (channel 10); WBPG's operations were subsequently merged with WALA at the latter station's facility on Satchel Paige Drive. LIN TV Corporation acquired WALA-TV on November 30, 2005; instead of acquiring WBPG directly along with it, the company instead began to operate the station under a local marketing agreement. Just over seven months later, on July 7, 2006, LIN purchased WBPG outright.

On January 24, 2006, CBS Corporation and Time Warner announced the shutdown of both UPN and The WB effective that fall. In place of these two networks, a new "fifth" network—"The CW Television Network" (its name representing the first initials of parent companies CBS and Warner Bros.), jointly owned by both companies, would launch, with a lineup primarily featuring the most popular programs from both networks. WBPG joined The CW on September 18, 2006.

With WALA having been relaunched using the myFox format, WBPG is now relaunched on a separate website on late August 2007.

The station changed its call letters to WFNA in October 2009, as part of a larger rebranding campaign that took effect on December 18. The rebranding de-emphasized the CW network branding in favor of the station's call letters—a practice similar to that of what Tribune Broadcasting's CW affiliates adopted starting in 2008. However, in September 2012, WFNA reverted to using CW branding and became known as "CW 55."

WFNA logo used from 2012 until 2017.

On March 21, 2014, LIN Media entered into an agreement to merge with Media General (which itself would be acquired by Nexstar Media Group three years later) in a $1.6 billion deal. Because Media General already owned CBS affiliate WKRG-TV (channel 5), the companies planned to either sell WALA or WKRG to comply with Federal Communications Commission (FCC) ownership rules as well as planned changes to those rules regarding same-market television stations which would prohibit sharing agreements. In addition, WFNA would also either be retained by Media General to form a new duopoly with WKRG or remain part of the existing duopoly with WALA should the two stations be kept or sold off. On August 20, 2014, it was announced that WALA would be sold to the Des Moines-based Meredith Corporation for $86 million. WFNA, however, was not included in the sale; as a result, WFNA formed a new duopoly with WKRG under Media General ownership, which marked the first time since the FCC allowed legal television duopolies in August 1999 that a station has been involved in a sale transaction in which it was fully separated from its original duopoly partner to form another duopoly (a similar situation occurred in Phoenix, Arizona, with KTVK and KASW upon their sales to Meredith in December 2013, which already owned KPHO-TV in that market, although KASW was retained by Meredith through a shared services agreement). The merger was completed on December 19. Oddly, Meredith retained the domain for WFNA's website, and until the Nexstar merger closed the station had no site, even for minimum FCC and Equal Opportunity Employer disclosures. This has since been rectified.

WFNA logo used from 2017 until 2024.

== Newscasts ==
Under the ownership of WALA, WFNA did not carry any newscasts outside of shared severe weather coverage as WALA's Fox affiliation made it unnecessary to have WFNA carry newscasts in other timeslots. Under WKRG's ownership, WFNA began to simulcast WKRG's two-hour morning newscast on April 20, 2015, mainly as a stopgap solution to fill the timeslot of The Daily Buzz, which was abruptly canceled by its producer on April 16; the simulcast was made permanent for the 2015–16 television season.

In June 2016, WFNA introduced a prime time newscast produced by WKRG, CW 55 News at 9; it is focused primarily on the Pensacola portion of the market. In April 2018, the separate branding was dropped, and the newscast is now presented under WKRG's News 5 branding.

== Technical information and subchannels ==
The station's ATSC 1.0 channels are carried on the multiplexed signals of WKRG-TV and WFGX:

Subchannels provided by WFNA (ATSC 1.0)
| Subchannel | Res. | Short name | Programming | ATSC 1.0 host |
|---|---|---|---|---|
| 55.1 | 1080i | WFNA-TV | The CW | WKRG-TV |
| 55.2 | 480i | Bounce | Bounce TV | WFGX |
| 55.3 | 480i | Busted | Busted | WFGX |
| 55.4 | 480i | Grit | Grit | WFGX |

WFNA has carried Bounce TV on its second subchannel since the network's launch in September 2011.

=== Analog-to-digital conversion ===
Because it was granted an original construction permit after the FCC finalized the DTV allotment plan on April 21, 1997, WBPG did not receive a companion channel for a digital television station. However, because channel 55 was among the high band UHF channels (52-69) that were removed from broadcasting use as a result of the transition (and was auctioned to Qualcomm for use by its MediaFLO mobile video system), WBPG was assigned channel 25 by the FCC for its post-transition digital signal. Several months prior to the shutdown of its analog signal, WBPG signed on digital channel 25, but at a reduced power so as to interfere with the analog signal of WXXV-TV in Gulfport, Mississippi, which also broadcast on channel 25. Like WBPG, it shut down its analog signal on February 17, 2009. It would be over a year before WXXV's digital signal was broadcasting at full power. The station broadcast its digital signal on the second digital subchannel of then-sister station WALA-TV until March 2007.

WBPG ended regular programming on its analog signal, over UHF channel 55, on February 17, 2009, the original target date on which full-power television stations in the United States transitioned from analog to digital broadcasts under federal mandate (which was later changed to June 12). The station flash-cut its digital signal on UHF channel 25, using virtual channel 55.

=== ATSC 3.0 ===
The station's ATSC 3.0 signal is broadcast from a transmitter in unincorporated Baldwin County near Spanish Fort, Alabama.

Subchannels of WFNA (ATSC 3.0)
| Subchannel | Res. | Short name | Programming |
|---|---|---|---|
| 5.1 | 1080p | WKRG-HD | CBS (WKRG-TV) |
| 35.1 | 720p | WFGX | MyNetworkTV (WFGX) |
| 55.1 | 1080p | WFNA-TV | The CW |
