= Savoy Pictures =

American independent film production and distribution company (1992–1997)

Savoy Pictures Entertainment, Inc.
- Industry: Independent film studio, television station holdings company
- Founded: 1992; 34 years ago
- Founder: Victor Kaufman
- Defunct: 1997; 29 years ago
- Fate: Acquired by USA Networks, Inc.; USA's entertainment assets acquired by Vivendi Universal in 2002
- Successor: Studio: USA Films; Library: Universal Pictures (through Focus Features) (with some exceptions)
- Headquarters: United States
- Key people: Victor A. Kaufman; Lewis J. Korman
- Products: Motion Pictures
- Owner: IAC (1995–1997)
- Number of employees: 16 (1997)
- Subsidiaries: HBO Savoy Video; Savoy Pictures Television; SF Broadcasting

Savoy Pictures Entertainment, Inc. was an American independent motion picture company that operated from 1992 to 1997, when it was acquired by USA Networks, Inc.; USA's entertainment assets were acquired by Vivendi Universal in 2002. Among Savoy Pictures' noteworthy feature films were No Escape, and Last of the Dogmen.

== History ==
Former Columbia Pictures Entertainment chairman and TriStar Pictures founder Victor A. Kaufman became chairman and chief executive officer of Savoy Pictures in 1992 along with vice chairman executive, Lewis J. Korman. Kaufman has claimed that the name came from the Savoy Special bat Robert Redford's character used in The Natural. Savoy intended to finance and distribute films in the $12–25 million range, investing in up to $15 million per film. In June of that year, Savoy entered into a deal with HBO for the home video, pay-TV, and pay-per-view rights to its films.

Budgets for their films grew. However, with rather poor marketing, Savoy faced a major financial slump, only three years after being formed. For three years, Savoy then released box office failures including Exit to Eden and Getting Away with Murder. It also didn't help that two of its competitors in the independent film field, Miramax and New Line Cinema, were bought out by majors (The Walt Disney Company and Turner Broadcasting, respectively), giving them stability. As a result, Savoy focused on low-budget films and the occasional blockbuster, costing up to $80 million. Executives hoped to lure Sylvester Stallone with a then-hefty $20 million paycheck to star in a studio project that was ultimately never made.

In the meantime, Savoy expanded into broadcasting to help the investment of films. In March 1994, Savoy created SF Broadcasting as a venture with Fox Television Stations, with Kaufman and Korman owning controlling interest. As a result of purchasing these stations, all of them would become affiliates of the Fox network. Stations owned by SF Broadcasting were WALA-TV in Mobile, Alabama, WLUK-TV in Green Bay, Wisconsin, WVUE in New Orleans, and KHON-TV in Honolulu, Hawaii. Savoy also launched a television production division.

In January 1995, Kaufman announced that he was hiring Robert N. Fried to run the motion picture studio. Fried brought in executives Alan Sokol, Bob Levin, Cathy Schulman, Stan Brooks, Stan Wlodkowski and filmmakers Sam Raimi, and George Tillman, Rob Weiss and Peter Chelsom. In the middle of the year, the company started a television division, which was headed by Stanley Brooks. In September 1995, Kaufman announced that he was cutting back on his interest in the motion picture business and was re-positioning the company as a television station holding company.

Shortly thereafter, Savoy announced the sale of 14 films in its roster, in varying stages of production, to potential buyers. New Line Cinema picked up Martin Lawrence's directorial debut A Thin Line Between Love and Hate, American History X, The Adventures of Pinocchio, Heaven's Prisoners, Faithful, and The Stupids. Paramount Pictures picked up the rights to produce A Simple Plan, and the distribution rights of Private Parts. Only a single film Savoy had on their roster, Mariette in Ecstasy, was left unreleased, until 2019, when the film's director John Bailey, eventually saw a screening at the 2019 Camerimage International Film Festival. The other two films Savoy had on their roster Scenes for the Soul, and Let It Be Me went unreleased.

Savoy Pictures announced in November 1995 that Barry Diller's Silver King Communications was going to acquire Savoy for $210 million. The deal was finalized in 1997. Victor Kaufman was made vice chairman and sits on the board of directors of IAC. The SF stations were sold to Diller's Silver King Broadcasting in 1997.

Cineplex Odeon Films was the Canadian distributor for Savoy films, then Alliance Films became the Canadian distributor after New Line Cinema picked up the later films from 1996.

Much of Savoy's library now lies with Universal Pictures and Focus Features, most likely as a result of Diller selling off USA Networks' entertainment assets to Vivendi Universal for $10.3 billion. Warner Bros. Discovery owns the titles produced by New Line Cinema, while Paramount Pictures owns the titles produced by Rysher Entertainment, Pathé owns the rights to No Escape via Allied Filmmakers, rights to A Bronx Tale have since reverted to Robert De Niro's Tribeca Productions, and Joel B. Michaels owns the rights to Last of the Dogmen.

== Films ==
Release date	Title	Notes
September 29, 1993	A Bronx Tale	North American distribution only; produced by Price Entertainment, Penta Entertainment and Tribeca Productions
December 25, 1993	Shadowlands	North American distribution only; produced by Price Entertainment and Spelling Films International
March 11, 1994	Lightning Jack	North American distribution only; produced by Lightning Ridge Productions and Village Roadshow; distributed internationally by Buena Vista International outside Australia and New Zealand
April 13, 1994	Serial Mom	co-production with Polar Entertainment Corporation
April 29, 1994	No Escape	North American, U.K. and Irish distribution only; produced by Allied Filmmakers and Pacific Western; distributed in other territories by Columbia TriStar Film Distributors International under Escape from Absolom
October 14, 1994	Exit to Eden	
February 24, 1995	The Walking Dead	co-production with Price Entertainment and the Jackson/McHenry Company
March 15, 1995	Circle of Friends	North American distribution only; co-production with Price Entertainment and Lantana Productions; distributed internationally by Rank Film Distributors
April 28, 1995	Destiny Turns on the Radio	North American theatrical distribution only; produced by Rysher Entertainment
May 24, 1995	Tales from the Hood	distribution only; produced by 40 Acres and a Mule Filmworks
August 25, 1995	Dr. Jekyll and Ms. Hyde	North American distribution only; co-production with Rastar; distributed internationally by Rank Film Distributors
August 25, 1995	The Show	North American theatrical distribution only; produced by Rysher Entertainment
September 8, 1995	Last of the Dogmen	North American distribution only; produced by Joel B. Michaels Productions and Carolco Pictures
September 29, 1995	Steal Big Steal Little	North American distribution only; produced by Chicago Pacific Entertainment
October 27, 1995	Three Wishes	North American theatrical distribution only; produced by Rysher Entertainment
December 1, 1995	White Man's Burden	North American theatrical co-distribution with Rysher Entertainment only; produced by UGC
April 3, 1996	Faithful	co-production with Price Entertainment, Miramax Films and Tribeca Productions; distributed by New Line Cinema in North America and Miramax Films internationally
April 5, 1996	A Thin Line Between Love and Hate	co-production with the Jackson/McHenry Company and You Go Boy! Productions; distributed by New Line Cinema
April 12, 1996	Getting Away with Murder	North American distribution only; co-production with Parkway Productions and Price Entertainment; distributed internationally by Rank Film Distributors
May 17, 1996	Heaven's Prisoners	co-production with PVM Entertainment; distributed by New Line Cinema in North America and Rank Film Distributors internationally
July 26, 1996	The Adventures of Pinocchio	North American co-distribution with New Line Cinema only; produced by the Kushner-Locke Company and Twin Continental Films
August 14, 1996	House Arrest	original distribution only; distribution rights sold to Metro-Goldwyn-Mayer; produced by Rysher Entertainment
August 30, 1996	The Stupids	distributed by New Line Cinema in North America and Rank Film Distributors internationally
March 7, 1997	Private Parts	original distribution only; distribution rights sold to Paramount Pictures; produced by Rysher Entertainment and Northern Lights Entertainment
December 11, 1998	A Simple Plan	studio credit only; co-production with Mutual Film Company, Tele-München and BBC; distributed by Paramount Pictures
March 30, 1999	My Teacher's Wife	distributed by Trimark Pictures
Unreleased	Mariette in Ecstasy	co-production with Price Entertainment and Rastar
Unreleased	Scenes for the Soul	co-production with Jackson McHenry Entertainment
Unreleased	Let It Be Me	intended distribution only; produced by Rysher Entertainment
