= WALA-TV =

Television station in Mobile, Alabama

- Mobile, Alabama; Pensacola, Florida; United States
- City: Mobile, Alabama
- Channels: Digital: 9 (VHF); Virtual: 10
- Branding: Fox 10

Programming
- Affiliations: 10.1: Fox; for others, see § Subchannels

Ownership
- Owner: Gray Media; (Gray Television Licensee, LLC)
- Sister stations: WMBP-LD

History
- First air date: January 14, 1953
- Former channel numbers: Analog: 10 (VHF, 1953–2009)
- Former affiliations: NBC (1953–1996); CBS/ABC (secondary, 1953–1955); DuMont (secondary, 1953–1955); NTA (secondary, 1956–1961)
- Call sign meaning: Alabama or "We Are Loyal Alabamians"

Technical information
- Licensing authority: FCC
- Facility ID: 4143
- ERP: 29 kW
- HAAT: 381 m (1,250 ft)
- Transmitter coordinates: 30°41′17″N 87°47′54″W

Links
- Public license information: Public file; LMS
- Website: www.fox10tv.com

WALA-TV (channel 10) is a television station licensed to Mobile, Alabama, United States, serving as the Fox affiliate for southwest Alabama and northwest Florida. Owned by Gray Media alongside Telemundo affiliate WMBP-LD (channel 31), the station maintains studios on Satchel Paige Drive in Mobile, with an additional studio and news bureau on Executive Plaza Drive in Pensacola, Florida; its transmitter is located in Spanish Fort, Alabama.

WALA-TV previously operated a 24-hour local weather channel called "Weather Now" which was available on Cox Communications digital channel 698 in Pensacola; it was not carried on Comcast Xfinity on the Alabama side of the market.

== History ==
=== Early history ===
WALA signed on the air for the first time on January 14, 1953; it is Mobile's oldest existing television station (the first, WKAB-TV channel 48, had beaten WALA-TV to air by two weeks but closed on August 2, 1954). It was initially locally owned by W.O. Pape, along with WALA radio (1410 AM, now WNGL). It aired programs from all four major television networks of the time–NBC, ABC, CBS, and DuMont–but was a primary NBC affiliate, as WALA radio had been a longtime affiliate of the network's direct predecessor, the NBC Red Network. WALA lost CBS and ABC programming to WKRG-TV (channel 5) when it signed on, and to WEAR-TV (channel 3) relinquished CBS programming and became a full-time ABC affiliate for the newly enlarged Mobile/Pensacola market in 1955. During the late 1950s, WALA was also briefly affiliated with the NTA Film Network. Pape sold WALA in 1964 to the Roywood Corporation. In 1969, Roywood sold WALA to the Universal Communications Corporation, the television arm of the Detroit News.

For most its first four decades on the air, WALA was the market's ratings leader. As the more established outlet, WALA got the strongest syndicated programming and it had the top-rated local newscasts. Even today, WALA continues to dominate in local news viewership, even after the affiliation switch from NBC to Fox.

The Gannett Company bought out the Evening News Association in early 1986, but due to the company's ownership of the Pensacola News Journal, and Federal Communications Commission (FCC) regulations barring common ownership of television stations and newspapers in the same market, Gannett was forced to put channel 10 on the market only a month after the merger closed. Gannett sold WALA-TV to Knight Ridder Broadcasting on February 19, 1986 (similarly as Gannett owned television stations in both markets, two other stations involved in the Universal Communications sale—KTVY [now KFOR-TV] in Oklahoma City and KOLD-TV in Tucson, Arizona—were also sold to Knight Ridder as FCC rules of the time prohibited newspaper cross-ownership [in both the WALA-TV and KOLD-TV cases] and television duopolies in KTVY's case); Knight Ridder, in turn, sold WALA to Burnham Broadcasting in 1989.

=== Fox affiliation ===
After it acquired the television rights to broadcast games from the NFL's National Football Conference in December 1993, Fox wanted to upgrade its affiliates in many markets, approaching owners of VHF television stations (broadcasting on channels 2 to 13) that had more value with advertisers than those within Fox's predominately UHF station portfolio for affiliation deals. In May 1994, the network announced an extensive affiliation and programming agreement with New World Communications—which owned, and was in the process of acquiring, stations in several large and mid-sized markets—in which most of the group's stations would switch their affiliations from one of the "Big Three" networks (CBS, ABC and NBC) to Fox beginning in the fall of 1994 and continuing over the next two years as affiliation contracts lapsed. More stations would switch to the network in 1995, when New World merged with Argyle Television and bought several stations from Citicasters. In turn, News Corporation purchased New World in September 1996, and merged it into its Fox Television Stations subsidiary in January 1997. As a result of Fox's influence in striking affiliations with additional VHF stations to help establish itself as the fourth major network, it sought to upgrade its affiliates—this time in smaller markets.

In March 1994, Fox's then-parent News Corporation entered into a partnership with minority-owned film and television production company Savoy Pictures to form a television station ownership group called SF Broadcasting. On August 25, 1994, the company bought WALA, WVUE-TV in New Orleans, and KHON-TV in Honolulu for $229 million; fellow sister station WLUK-TV in Green Bay, Wisconsin, was sold to the company one month earlier in a separate $38 million deal, which for a time, was challenged by an FCC petition filed by NBC alleging that the deal violated foreign investment limits for U.S. broadcasters (a fifth Burnham station, KBAK-TV in Bakersfield, California, was excluded from the SF deal and was instead spun off to Westwind Communications, a new company formed by several former Burnham executives). As part of the deal, all four stations—which were then mostly NBC affiliates, aside from WVUE, then an ABC affiliate—would drop their Big Three affiliations and become Fox affiliates. Fox was slated to control the voting stock in the venture, but prior to the sale's closure in 1995, it was determined that Fox would still hold an interest in SF although it opted not to have voting stock in the company. Savoy Pictures controlled the day-to-day operations of the four stations. Almost by default, NBC was then left to go with WPMI.

The final NBC program to air on WALA-TV was an NBC Sunday Night Movie presentation of Final Analysis at 8 p.m. Central Time on December 31, 1995, the day that channel 10 ended its 42-year affiliation with the network and became a Fox affiliate with WVUE and KHON also switched to that network on that same date, while WLUK had joined Fox in August 1995. The NBC affiliation moved to former Fox affiliate WPMI-TV (channel 15). Unlike the New World Communications-owned Fox affiliates that joined the network during the previous 18-month span, WALA ran Fox Kids programming on weekdays and Saturday mornings; until Fox discontinued the weekday block in December 2001, Fox Kids ran Monday through Fridays from 1 to 4 p.m. (an hour earlier than most of its fellow Fox stations), replacing NBC's daytime soap opera lineup upon the switch; Fox Kids' Saturday morning block, meanwhile, aired in pattern. WALA, now rebranded as "Fox 10" upon the switch, also expanded its local news programming to around 25 hours each week, with expansions to its morning and evening newscasts.

==== Silver King Broadcasting and Emmis Communications ownership ====
On November 28, 1995, Silver King Communications (operated by former Fox executive Barry Diller) announced that it would acquire Savoy Pictures; as a result, Savoy Pictures and Fox ended their partnership and sold the SF Broadcasting stations, including WALA-TV, to the USA Networks division Silver King Broadcasting. Silver King, which later became known as USA Broadcasting, owned several stations in large and mid-sized U.S. markets that were affiliated with the Home Shopping Network (HSN), which USA Networks also owned at the time. The sale of WALA and the other SF Broadcasting stations was approved and finalized in March 1996, with its other assets being merged into the company that November. On April 1, 1998, USA sold all four of its Fox stations to Emmis Communications for $307 million in cash and stock, as part of a sale of its major network affiliates in order to concentrate on its formerly HSN-affiliated independent stations.

Fox discontinued its weekday afternoon children's programming block, then running for only two hours in December 2001, but retained its Saturday morning lineup. In 2002, the children's block was revamped as the FoxBox and then began to be programmed by 4Kids Entertainment in 2003, after which it was eventually renamed 4Kids TV (4Kids Entertainment ceased programming Fox's children's block in December 2008, with the network discontinuing its children's programming altogether). At this point WALA, like most Fox affiliates, would purchase more talk and reality-based shows to fill its daytime timeslots.

Emmis bought WB affiliate WBPG (channel 55, now CW owned-and-operated station WFNA) in 2003, creating a duopoly with channel 10; WBPG's operations were subsequently merged with WALA at the latter station's facility on Satchel Paige Drive.

==== LIN Media ownership ====
On May 15, 2005, Emmis Communications announced that it would sell its 16 television stations, including WALA and WBPG, in order to concentrate on its radio properties. WALA and WBPG were then sold to LIN TV Corporation on August 22, as part of a $260 million deal that included WLUK-TV, and CBS affiliates WTHI-TV in Terre Haute, Indiana and KRQE in Albuquerque, New Mexico; the sale of WALA closed on November 30, 2005, at which time LIN also began to operate WBPG under a local marketing agreement. LIN TV would purchase WBPG outright on July 7, 2006, reforming a legal duopoly between the stations.

Until March 2007, WALA carried a simulcast of WBPG on a second digital subchannel as that station did not have a digital signal of its own. WBPG eventually launched a low-power digital signal in late 2008 and boosted to full power in 2009, when WXXV-TV in neighboring Biloxi, Mississippi abandoned its analog signal on UHF channel 25, which shared the digital frequency that WBPG was assigned. On May 18, 2007, LIN TV announced that it was exploring strategic alternatives that would have resulted in the sale of the company.

In mid-June 2007, following the lead of most of the other LIN-owned Fox affiliates, WALA launched a new website using Fox Interactive's myFox interface. In October 2008, WALA and CBS sister station WPRI-TV in Providence, Rhode Island relaunched their websites through Fox Interactive as a result of a new partnership between LIN TV and News Corporation (since spun off as the independent company now known as EndPlay). The new sites were similar in format to the myFox sites (which WALA and the other LIN TV-owned Fox affiliates previously used) but without the flashy myFox owned-and-operated station-style look. Over the next few weeks, the other LIN-owned stations (irrespective of their network affiliation) followed suit.

==== Media General/LIN merger and spinoff to Meredith ====
On March 21, 2014, LIN Media entered into an agreement to merge with Media General in a $1.6 billion deal. Because Media General already owns CBS affiliate WKRG-TV (channel 5), and the two stations rank among the four highest-rated stations in the Mobile/Pensacola market in total day viewership, the companies were required to sell WALA or WKRG to comply with FCC ownership rules as well as planned changes to those rules regarding same-market television stations which would prohibit sharing agreements. To settle the ownership conflict, Media General announced on August 20, 2014, that it would keep WKRG, choosing to sell WALA to the Meredith Corporation for $86 million; the deal also resulted in the breakup of the duopoly between WALA and WFNA as Media General opted to acquire the latter station and operate it alongside WKRG. The sale was completed on December 19, 2014.

However, nearly nine months later on September 8, 2015, Media General announced that it would acquire Meredith for $2.4 billion, with the combined group to be renamed Meredith Media General upon the sale's expected closure by June 2016. Due to the same ownership conflicts with the LIN-Media General merger that resulted in WALA's sale to Meredith, the two companies would have been required to sell either WALA or WKRG to comply with FCC ownership rules; WFNA is the only station that can legally be acquired by Meredith Media General as it is not among the Mobile/Pensacola market's four highest-rated television stations, and can either be maintained in its new duopoly with WKRG, or reunited in a duopoly with WALA. On January 27, 2016, Media General announced that it was terminating its agreement to acquire Meredith and instead agreed to be acquired by Nexstar Broadcasting Group.

==== Sale to Gray Television ====
On May 3, 2021, Gray Television announced its intent to purchase the Meredith Local Media division for $2.7 billion. The sale was completed on December 1. As a result, WALA-TV became a sister station to numerous other stations in nearby markets, including fellow Fox affiliates WBRC in Birmingham and WVUE-DT in New Orleans (reuniting with the latter after being separated for 16 years); NBC affiliates WAFF in Huntsville, WSFA in Montgomery and WJHG-TV in Panama City; CBS affiliate WTVY in Dothan and ABC affiliates WLOX in Biloxi, WTVM in Columbus, Georgia and WTOK-TV in Meridian.

== Local programming ==
WALA broadcasts a local program called Studio 10, which features entertainment and local segments, which are usually paid for by the guests who appear on the show. The hour-long program, which airs weekdays at 9 a.m., is hosted by Joe Emer and Chelsey Sayasane, and features weather forecasts from meteorologist Jennifer Lambers.

On December 30, 2023, WALA-TV parent company Gray Television announced it had reached an agreement with the New Orleans Pelicans to air 10 games on the station during the 2023–24 season.

On September 17, 2024, Gray and the Pelicans announced a broader deal to form the Gulf Coast Sports & Entertainment Network, which will broadcast nearly all 2024–25 Pelicans games on Gray's stations in the Gulf South, including WALA-TV.

=== News operation ===
Channel 10 has led the news ratings in the Mobile–Pensacola market for most of the time since records have been kept, dating to its time as an NBC affiliate. After joining Fox, it maintained a news schedule very similar to what it had in its waning days as an NBC affiliate. It retained all of its existing newscasts, while adding several new newscasts to make up for the loss of network news programming.

On April 21, 2012, WALA-TV became the third television station in the Mobile–Pensacola market to begin broadcasting its local newscasts in high definition (WPMI-TV would soon follow one day later), with the introduction of a brand new set and graphics. On August 27, 2012, WALA became the first station in the market to debut a 4:30 a.m. newscast. However, due to Hurricane Isaac, other stations were doing expanded coverage as well due to the impending storm, which would eventually affect the New Orleans area and spare Mobile from the brunt of the storm. On January 27, 2014, WALA expanded its weekday morning newscast to 4 1/2 hours, running from 4:30 to 9 a.m.; as a result, the morning talk and lifestyle program Studio 10 was moved one hour later to 9 a.m.

On August 8, 2015, WALA debuted two-hour morning newscasts from 6 to 8 a.m. on Saturdays and Sundays, becoming the third weekend morning local news program in the Mobile–Pensacola market (WEAR-TV has had a weekend morning newscast since 2009, while WKRG debuted its own newscast in that daypart two months before WALA debuted theirs). Subsequently, on August 24, 2015, the station restored a 10 p.m. newscast—which airs only on Monday through Fridays—to its schedule after 14 years.

==== Notable former on-air staff ====
- Bill Evans
- John Oldshue
- John Edd Thompson

== Technical information ==
=== Subchannels ===
The station's signal is multiplexed:

Subchannels of WALA-TV
Subchannel	Res.	Short name	Programming
10.1	720p	WALA	Fox
10.2	480i	COZI	Cozi TV
10.3	480i	LAFF	Laff
10.4	480i	MYSTERY	Ion Mystery
10.5	720p	GCSEN	Gulf Coast SEN
10.6	480i	OXYGEN	Oxygen
10.7	480i	MeTV	MeTV

On August 7, 2009, WALA began offering a Mobile TV feed using BlackBerry.

=== Analog-to-digital conversion ===
WALA-TV discontinued regular programming on its analog signal, over VHF channel 10, on June 12, 2009, the official date on which full-power television stations in the United States transitioned from analog to digital broadcasts under federal mandate. The station's digital signal remained on its pre-transition VHF channel 9, using virtual channel 10.
