= KFIZ =

KFIZ may refer to:

- KFIZ (AM), a radio station (1450 AM) licensed to Fond du Lac, Wisconsin, United States
- KFIZ-TV, a defunct television station (channel 34) in Fond du Lac, Wisconsin, United States
- WFON, a radio station (107.1 FM) licensed to Fond du Lac, Wisconsin, United States, which used the call sign KFIZ-FM from November 1993 to February 2004
