= WSTM =

WSTM may refer to:

Current stations:

- WSTM-TV, a television station (channel 19, virtual 3) licensed to Syracuse, New York, United States
- WSTM (FM), a radio station (91.3 FM) licensed to Kiel, Wisconsin, United States

Former stations:

- WQNU, a radio station (103.1 FM) licensed to Lyndon, Kentucky, United States that used the WSTM call letters prior to 1978
