= WGXI =

Coordinates: 43°44′33″N 87°56′21″W

- Plymouth, Wisconsin; United States
- Broadcast area: Sheboygan County
- Frequency: 1420 kHz
- Branding: Cow Country

Programming
- Format: Classic country–classic rock
- Affiliations: Midwest Farm Report

Ownership
- Owner: Stu Muck and David Hendrickson; (Galaxie Broadcasting, LLC)

History
- First air date: April 1954; 72 years ago
- Former call signs: WPLY (1954–1991); WJUB (1991–2018)
- Call sign meaning: Galaxie Broadcasting (station owner)

Technical information
- Licensing authority: FCC
- Facility ID: 32846
- Class: D
- Power: 500 watts (day); 62 watts (night)
- Translators: 98.5 W253CW (Plymouth); 107.3 W297CK (Sheboygan) (WCLB)
- Repeater: 950 WCLB (Sheboygan)

Links
- Public license information: Public file; LMS
- Webcast: Listen live
- Website: cowcountry.us

WGXI (1420 AM) is a radio station licensed to Plymouth, Wisconsin and serving the Sheboygan County area, which features a classic country/rock hybrid format under the branding "Cow Country 1420AM 98.5FM". WGXI is affiliated with the Midwest Farm Report, Bill Baker's Dairy Minute, weather forecasts from WISN-TV in Milwaukee, and carries Plymouth High School boys varsity football. The station's studios are located on WI 57 North just east of Plymouth, with its transmitter behind the studio building. WGXI also utilizes an FM translator station, W253CW (98.5), which also broadcasts from the same facility and allows a clear stereo signal to be carried at all hours throughout most of Sheboygan County.

Additionally, Galaxy Broadcasting operates WCLB (950), licensed to Sheboygan, as a simulcast of WGXI's programming under an operating agreement with that station's owner, Mountain Dog Media, to serve the eastern portion of Sheboygan County. WCLB is translated via FM on W297CK (107.3), also licensed to Sheboygan. WCLB's AM transmitter is located in Sheboygan Falls, with W297CK's transmitter located behind the Sheboygan County Detention Center on Sheboygan's south side.

== Station history ==
The station flipped to an adult standards format in 2003, shifting to it shortly after WCLB in Sheboygan converted to ESPN Radio and the launch of WSTM, which allowed the offloading of some programming onto that FM signal. WGXI previously aired a Christian format, and as WPLY, adult contemporary, country music and Top 40 formats. It was the AM sister to WXER (104.5), also Plymouth-licensed, from its launch in 1990 until its 1995 sale to other interests who moved the station's broadcast facilities (though not main transmitter) closer to Sheboygan, where a secondary translator was eventually established.

After Evangel Ministries purchased WSTM in early 2017 with the then-WJUB to convert WSTM to its general contemporary Christian "The Family" format, WJUB was considered a surplus asset in the sale and was sold to Galaxie Broadcasting, a company made up of Stuart Muck and longtime WJUB on-air programmer and personality David Hendrickson, who continued to maintain the station's format as-is since Galaxie's purchase was completed. The first effect of the sale was the affiliation with the Marquette basketball network.

In early 2018, the station also filed for an FM translator station with the FCC as part of the agency's January 2018 AM revitalization translator window, transmitting from Plymouth on 98.5 at 250 watts. With WCLB signing on their translator in mid-November 2018, WGXI was the last of Sheboygan County's three AM stations to launch an FM translator.

The station changed its call sign to WGXI on April 5, 2018. Galaxie had attempted to re-acquire the former WPLY calls from the Roanoke, Virginia sports radio station that currently holds them, but was refused.

The translator did launch on October 30, 2019; with it, the standards format was dropped for a more FM-viable Soft/Gold AC format, and rebranded as "Love 98.5". After gauging listener feedback during a break in the format between Thanksgiving and Christmas for Christmas music, the station returned a number of standards to its playlist in 2020.

On January 20, 2021, WGXI changed their format to a classic rock/country hybrid, branded as "Cow Country", in honor of Antoinette, the locally known fiberglass Holstein cow statue standing outside the former Plymouth Utilities building downtown.

=== Addition of WCLB simulcast ===
Over the last week of 2023, WCLB's former operator (who provided the station's programming remotely, with its owner maintaining the actual facilities) wound down its programming agreement with Mountain Dog Media to carry its Rhythmic Top 40 format as Z107, and the station went silent over the New Year's weekend into 2024. During the afternoon of January 2, 2024, that station came back on the air, now simulcasting WGXI; Dave Hendrickson had been an on-air personality on WXER before WCLB's sale to Mountain Dog, and took on additional duties with WCLB before moving on to what was then WJUB in the early 2000s.

There has been no paperwork regarding a sale of WCLB to Galaxy Broadcasting, although the simulcast consolidates the two commercial Sheboygan County stations not owned by Midwest Communications into one unit. It also brings a solid FM signal for WGXI into Sheboygan via the FM translator; though WGXI has a translator itself, it has limited reach into Sheboygan. The arrangement was announced on January 9 after a soft launch through WGXI's social media channels.
