= WEMI =

WEMI may refer to:

- WEMI (FM), a radio station (91.9 FM) licensed to Appleton, Wisconsin, United States
- Work, Expression, Manifestation, and Item -- entities in the Functional Requirements for Bibliographic Records
