= WEMY =

Radio station in Green Bay, Wisconsin

Coordinates: 44°21′32″N 87°59′07″W

Simulcast of WEMI Appleton
- Green Bay, Wisconsin; United States
- Frequency: 91.5 MHz
- Branding: The Family

Programming
- Format: Christian Adult Contemporary / Christian Talk and Teaching

Ownership
- Owner: The Family Radio Network, Inc.
- Sister stations: WEMI, WGNV

History
- First air date: August 26, 1974
- Former call signs: WGBW (1974–1998)
- Call sign meaning: Evangel Ministries (variation of WEMI)

Technical information
- Licensing authority: FCC
- Facility ID: 69196
- Class: A
- ERP: 710 Watts
- HAAT: 226 meters

Links
- Public license information: Public file; LMS
- Webcast: Listen Online
- Website: thefamily.net

WEMY (91.5 FM) is a Christian radio station serving the Green Bay, Wisconsin area. The station's format consists of Christian adult contemporary music with some Christian talk and teaching. WEMY is also heard in the Manitowoc–Two Rivers area through a translator on 95.5. It is part of "The Family" radio network based at WEMI in Appleton.

Prior to being a Christian radio station, 91.5 in Green Bay was established as WGBW, the radio station of the University of Wisconsin–Green Bay (UWGB), which later was absorbed into the Wisconsin Public Radio (WPR) network. The establishment of the higher-powered WHID (88.1 FM) superseded WGBW as a public station and led to the sale of the frequency to its present owners.

== History ==
=== Early years ===
When UWGB was founded in 1968, there was consideration of building a radio station on the campus, but the idea was not immediately pursued. However, by 1973, the project was revived. The 91.5 frequency had become available that January when the Wisconsin Educational FM Network, WPR's predecessor, replaced its transmitters at Suring (WHMD-FM) and Chilton with one transmitter on Scray Hill; at the time, the only Green Bay-centric opt-outs on the network were weather reports. On October 4, the Federal Communications Commission granted UWGB a construction permit for a new 3,000-watt radio station on the campus. It took longer than expected to acquire equipment and train students to run the new WGBW, which debuted August 26, 1974. Some of the equipment used came from the defunct Suring state transmitter.

Offering a broad mix of "alternative radio" six days a week (expanding to Sundays in 1975), WGBW was among the stronger campus stations in the UW system, also airing coverage of UWGB athletics. Students were heavily involved in the operation; in 1979, one student's entire semester credit load at UWGB consisted of programming WGBW for six hours a day, which represented a major increase in the station's output.

=== A transition to public radio ===
By 1981, there were 11 campus stations in the UW System and nine in Wisconsin Public Radio, run by the Educational Communications Board. In January 1981, the board accepted a proposal that would make it the sole public broadcasting agency in the state of Wisconsin, as fears of budget cuts and new technologies prompted a proposal to team campus stations and WPR outlets covering the same areas. No changes were immediately felt after the move, with student programming continuing to air on the station. In 1985, however, a complaint about obscene descriptions of sexual activity led the station to temporarily halt broadcasting after 5 p.m. The self-imposed cutback lasted into October, when station staffers sought ways to restore evening programming.

In late 1985, WGBW became the new home for morning news and talk programs from Wisconsin Public Radio, whose main Green Bay transmitter, WPNE, began to air more classical music; the station had generally been off the air on weekday mornings. The move, expanded in 1986, was part of the shift that had been considered in 1981 and was the beginning of WPR's restructuring into two program services. The partial WPR schedule on WGBW was also carried by WLFM at Lawrence University in Appleton, which had established a similar relationship with the state network.

On July 1, 1989, after nearly 15 years as a student radio station, Wisconsin Public Radio took full programming and budget control of WGBW, marking the end of the station's rock programming, though UWGB athletics coverage would remain on the station, per the agreement, and one local origination program would continue to feature student and volunteer DJs. Despite protests from student staff, UWGB chancellor David Outcalt refused to concede to concerns, citing the ability of WPR to better support the station. The discontent was heard on air in the form of an obscenity, which prompted the station to briefly go off the air just days before the WPR handover.

Under full WPR control, WGBW was initially programmed as a complementary service to WPNE, though both stations featured speech and music programming and simulcast Morning Edition and All Things Considered; plans were also put in place to relocate the station to Scray Hill alongside WPNE-FM-TV. This changed in 1990—with the power increase plans stalled—when WPR shuffled its programming to create more distinct news and music networks, with the major NPR programs being heard on WPNE.

Power increase plans for WGBW itself did not come to fruition, but WPR still wanted to put what had become its Ideas Network on equal footing with WPNE in the Green Bay and Appleton area. This led to the construction of an entirely new station on Scrays Hill, WHID (88.1 FM). After a simulcast period, WHID would replace WGBW, which would then be sold.

=== Evangel Ministries ownership ===
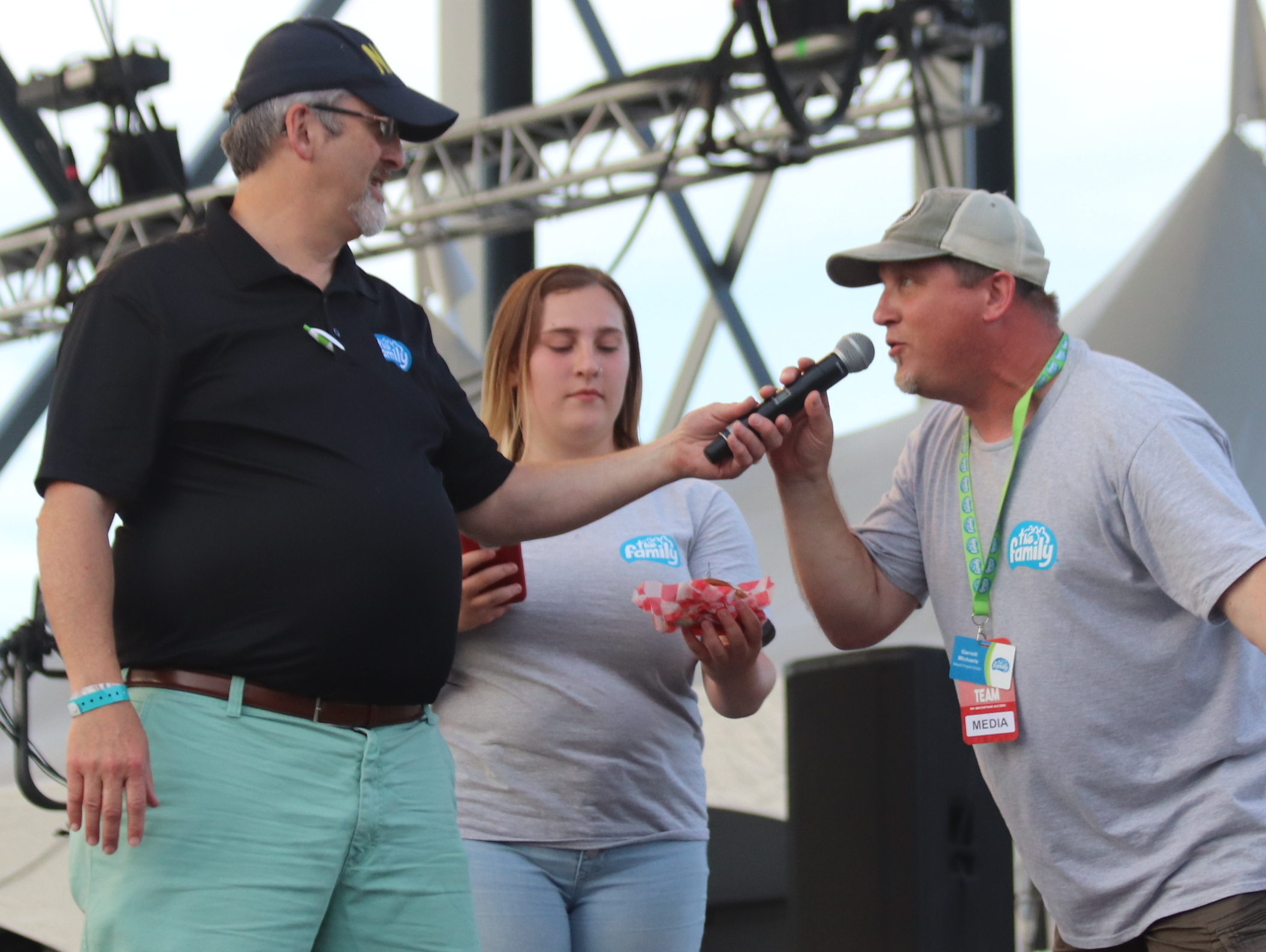
"The Family" DJs on stage at Lifest in 2019

Just before the launch of WHID in March 1998, WPR reached a deal to sell WGBW for $175,000 to Evangel Ministries, Inc., based in Appleton. Evangel, which had previously owned a Christian bookstore in Appleton and sold it to concentrate on its two existing Christian radio stations—WEMI and WGNV near Wausau—integrated the station into the network as WEMY and rebranded as "Christian Family Radio".

WEMI and WEMY rebranded as "The Family" in 2011; Evangel Ministries itself followed suit in 2017, changing its name to The Family Radio Network, Inc. After acquiring Sheboygan's WSTM in 2017, The Family network expanded to five main stations in 2020 when it purchased WDRK, now WGNW, in Eau Claire.

== Translator ==
Call sign	Frequency	City of license	FID	ERP (W)	Class	FCC info
W238BC	95.5 FM	Manitowoc, Wisconsin	144788	38	D	LMS
