= Randy Hopper =

American politician

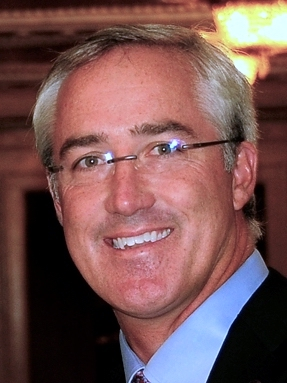
- Hopper in 2008

Member of the Wisconsin Senate from the 18th district
- In office January 3, 2009 – August 9, 2011
- Preceded by: Carol Roessler
- Succeeded by: Jessica King

Personal details
- Born: January 23, 1966 (age 60) Taylorville, Illinois, United States
- Party: Republican
- Spouse: Alysia Hopper (divorced)
- Education: Denison University (BA); Northwestern University (MA)
- Occupation: Broadcasting/radio station ownership

Randal B. Hopper (born 23 January 1966) is a former Republican member of the Wisconsin Senate, representing the 18th District from 2009 until losing his seat to Jessica King in a 2011 recall election. The 18th District includes the cities of Fond du Lac, Oshkosh, and Waupun.

== Early life, education and career ==
Born in Taylorville, Illinois, Hopper graduated from The Hill School. He then received his bachelor's degree from Denison University in 1989 and an MBA from Kellogg School of Management at Northwestern University in 2002.

Hopper is the co-owner of Mountain Dog Media, a radio station and broadcasting company that owns two Fond du Lac radio stations, KFIZ (1450) and WFON (107.1). In addition, Mountain Dog owns WCLB (950) in Sheboygan, which runs mainly automated programming from Fox Sports Radio. WCLB is run from MDM's Fond du Lac offices, and no staff is maintained in Sheboygan. He also operated New Holstein's WMBE (1530) in the same arrangement as WCLB, but with advertising meant for a Fox Cities audience. The station was sold to another party in late 2011, who terminated MDM's operating agreement and took the station silent to move it closer to Appleton as WLWB.

== Wisconsin Senate ==
Hopper showed strong support for Governor Walker's 2011 budget, which removed certain collective bargaining provisions for state and local government employees and made significant cuts to state budget and many programs. Hopper stated that the business climate would improve as a result of these Republican policies.

Hopper sat on the following committees 2011-2012:

- Economic Development, Veterans and Military Affairs (Chair)
- Energy, Biotechnology, Consumer Protection
- Finance
- Joint Committee on Finance
- Joint Survey Committee on Tax Exemptions (Co-chair)

=== Patronage alleged ===
Court records indicate Hopper filed a petition for divorce in August 2010. In a letter to Milwaukee television station WTMJ, Hopper's estranged wife, Alysia, wrote: "It is correct that my husband, Randy Hopper, started an affair in January 2010 with a then-25-year-old Republican aide. This affair has caused great emotional pain for my children and me. Randy moved out, without attempting marital counseling, as of May 2010 and now lives mostly in Madison."

Hopper's alleged mistress, Valerie Cass, was reportedly hired on February 7, 2011, by the State of Wisconsin Department of Regulation and Licensing as a limited-term communications specialist. Her salary was $5.35 per hour higher ($11,000 on an annualized basis) than that of her predecessor, explained by increased duties, professional experience, and relevant credentials. The limited-term position ended in August 2011. Hopper denied he had had any role in the hiring.

== 2011 recall ==
Hopper was subject to an active recall effort. On March 2, 2011, the "Committee to Recall Hopper" officially registered with the Wisconsin Government Accountability Board. 15,269 valid signatures of electors residing within the 18th district had to be collected by May 2, 2011, to generate a recall election. His estranged wife reportedly signed his recall petition.

A March 9, 2011, poll by Survey USA showed that voters in Hopper's district would vote for recall by 11 points. A March 10–13, 2011, poll by PPP (sponsored by Daily Kos) showed that voters in Hopper's district disapprove of his job performance 47-38 and support recall by 11 points. When asked if they would vote for Hopper or a generic Democratic candidate, Hopper trailed by 5% with 44% saying they would vote for Hopper again and 49% saying they would vote for the Democratic candidate. He was seen as particularly vulnerable to recall, considering that his victory in the 2008 election came only after a mandatory recount; the margin of victory was 163 votes.

On March 29, 2011, it was reported by the Milwaukee Journal Sentinel that the recall organizers appeared to have enough signatures to force a recall election. On April 7, 2011, organizers filed 23,946 signatures to recall Senator Hopper with the Government Accountability Board in Madison.

On April 13, 2011, Oshkosh Deputy Mayor Jessica King, who lost to Hopper by 163 votes in 2008, announced she would run against Hopper in a potential recall election.

In late May 2011, the Wisconsin Government Accountability Board verified petitions against Hopper, and scheduled the recall election for July 12, 2011. King defeated Hopper in the recall election with 51.13% of the vote, 28,188 to 26,937.

=== 2011 arrest ===
In October 2011, Hopper was arrested on a charge of drunk driving. In December, he pleaded not guilty and his jury trial started March 22, 2012. During the trial, Hopper's attorney, Dennis Melowski, argued that county employees, including the arresting officer, "were out to get him".

On March 23, 2012, a jury found Hopper not guilty.

=== Taxes ===
According to reporting by the Fond du Lac Reporter, Hopper paid state income tax once in the period between 1997 and 2008. The three businesses he owned had paid no net income tax during the same period.

== Electoral history ==
Wisconsin State Senate district 18 election 2008
Party	Candidate	Votes	%	±%
Republican	Randy Hopper	41,904	50.05%	
Democratic	Jessica King	41,741	49.86%	
	Scattering	79	.09%	

Wisconsin State Senate district 18 recall election 2011
Party	Candidate	Votes	%	±%
Democratic	Jessica King	28,811	51.13%	
Republican	Randy Hopper	26,937	48.86%	
