= WSTM (FM) =

- Kiel, Wisconsin; United States
- Broadcast area: Sheboygan and southern Manitowoc Counties
- Frequency: 91.3 MHz
- Branding: 91.3 The Family

Programming
- Format: Christian adult contemporary; Christian talk and teaching
- Affiliations: Salem Communications

Ownership
- Owner: The Family Radio Network

History
- First air date: May 12, 1998
- Call sign meaning: Serving the Master, a reference to the Parable of the Master and Servant

Technical information
- Licensing authority: FCC
- Facility ID: 90655
- Class: A
- ERP: 1,100 watts
- HAAT: 144 meters (472 ft)
- Transmitter coordinates: 43°43′23″N 88°3′52″W
- Translator: See § Translators

Links
- Public license information: Public file; LMS
- Webcast: Listen live
- Website: 913.thefamily.net

WSTM (91.3 FM) is a radio station broadcasting a Contemporary Inspirational format licensed to Kiel, Wisconsin, and broadcasting from the WXER transmitter west of Plymouth on WI 67. The station is currently owned by The Family Radio Network (the former Evangel Ministries), carrying a format shared with sister stations WEMI in Appleton, WEMY in Green Bay and WGNV in Milladore (serving Wausau and Stevens Point) known as "The Family". Studio facilities are located in Appleton.

As part of "The Family" schedule it also airs biblical and family-related programming, such as Insight for Living and Focus on the Family.

== History ==
The station went on the air as WSTM on May 12, 1998, becoming the second sister station to WJUB (1420) in its history on-air (from 1990 to 1995, WXER was run as a sister station from the WPLY-WJUB facility). On October 25, 2002, the station changed its call sign to the current WSTM. The merger between Evangel and The Family stations occurred in mid-2017; WJUB was considered surplus to the sale, and was sold to Galaxie Broadcasting, a company made up of Stuart Muck and longtime WJUB on-air programmer and personality Dave Hendrickson, who will continue to maintain the station's format as-is.

== Translators ==
In addition to the main station, WSTM is relayed by an additional translator to serve the city of Sheboygan, along with nearby Kohler.

Call sign	Frequency	City of license	FID	ERP (W)	Class	FCC info
W277BR	103.3 FM	Sheboygan, Wisconsin	150067	55	D	LMS
