= WHBZ =

- Sheboygan Falls, Wisconsin; United States
- Broadcast area: Sheboygan County, Wisconsin
- Frequency: 106.5 MHz
- Branding: 106.5 The Buzz

Programming
- Format: Mainstream rock
- Affiliations: Fox News Radio; United Stations Radio Networks

Ownership
- Owner: Midwest Communications; (Midwest Communications, Inc.)
- Sister stations: WHBL, WBFM, WXER

History
- First air date: 1997
- Former call signs: WWJR (1997–2001)
- Call sign meaning: Calls both denote its sister station WHBL and Buzz branding

Technical information
- Licensing authority: FCC
- Facility ID: 41614
- Class: A
- ERP: 6,000 watts
- HAAT: 73 meters
- Transmitter coordinates: 43°43′16.00″N 87°44′3.00″W

Links
- Public license information: Public file; LMS
- Webcast: Listen Live
- Website: 1065thebuzz.com

WHBZ (106.5 FM, "The Buzz") is a Sheboygan Falls, Wisconsin-licensed radio station based in Sheboygan that plays a mainstream rock format. The station is currently owned by Midwest Communications and features an all-local lineup, with Fox News Radio updates and forecasts provided by WLUK-TV in Green Bay.

== History ==
=== Intellectual property of WWJR (1972–2001) ===
The station originally went on the air as WHBL-FM in 1972 on 97.7 with an automated beautiful music format under the ownership of the (Sheboygan) Press Publishing Company. The WHBL stations were sold to Michael R. Walton in 1977, with its calls changing WWJR-FM on March 14, 1977, now featuring the initials of his son and future co-owner) Michael Walton Jr. The station vacillated between automated and live-hosted operation through most of those two decades, with occasional simulcasting with sister AM station WHBL, usually with adult contemporary formats. It moved to a new allocation in March 1993 at 93.7 as part of a large frequency swap throughout northeastern Wisconsin. A constant through the years was its annual broadcast of Christmas music throughout December.

The station's format and call letters moved to a new frequency licensed to Sheboygan Falls at 106.5 on April 4, 1997, to make room for country station WBFM on 93.7, moving towards an automated soft rock format, and was also the pre-WLKN home of Delilah. The WBFM facility holds the facility ID which originated with WHBL-FM in 1972, and the 106.5 frequency is officially a new radio station that launched in 1997.

=== WHBZ (2001–present) ===
After Midwest's purchase of the three Walton stations in mid-2001 and a transitional Hot AC format from July 2001, the station changed their calls to WHBZ on December 29, 2001, and on the same day changed over to rock as "The Buzz".

Until the second week of 2015 the station carried the syndicated Bob & Tom for their morning show with local news cut-ins, before deciding to switch to a nearly fully non-syndicated schedule outside of non-critical periods. Except for weeknights, where Nikki Sixx's Sixx Sense is aired, along with the Sunday night shows Rock Recall and hardDrive, all station programming is either originated locally from Sheboygan either live or recorded for overnight shifts, or voicetracked from other Midwest stations in Green Bay and Wausau. The station also is used to carry play-by-play from either the Packers or Brewers radio networks for the Sheboygan area in case of a conflict between the two teams on WHBL.
