= WHBL =

- Sheboygan, Wisconsin; United States
- Broadcast area: Sheboygan County
- Frequency: 1330 kHz
- Branding: 1330 & 101.5, WHBL

Programming
- Format: Conservative Talk
- Affiliations: Fox News Radio; Premiere Networks; Westwood One; Milwaukee Brewers Radio Network; Packers Radio Network; Wisconsin Badgers football Wisconsin Badgers men's basketball

Ownership
- Owner: Midwest Communications; (Midwest Communications, Inc.)
- Sister stations: WBFM, WHBZ, WXER

History
- First air date: February 23, 1928 (98 years ago)
- Call sign meaning: Though randomly-assigned, backronymed to stand for Wisconsin's Home By The Lake

Technical information
- Licensing authority: FCC
- Facility ID: 9967
- Class: B
- Power: 5,000 watts day 1,000 watts night
- Transmitter coordinates: 43°43′14″N 87°44′4″W
- Translator: 101.5 W268BR (Sheboygan)

Links
- Public license information: Public file; LMS
- Webcast: Listen Live
- Website: WHBL.com

WHBL (1330 AM) is a radio station in Sheboygan, Wisconsin with a Conservative talk radio format. The station is owned by Wausau-based Midwest Communications, along with three sister FM stations in the market.

WHBL's programming is also carried on an FM translator station in the immediate Sheboygan area, W268BR, 101.5 FM, which like WHBL transmits from the Midwest tower site on Sheboygan's south side. W268BR launched operations on April 16, 2016.

== Programming ==
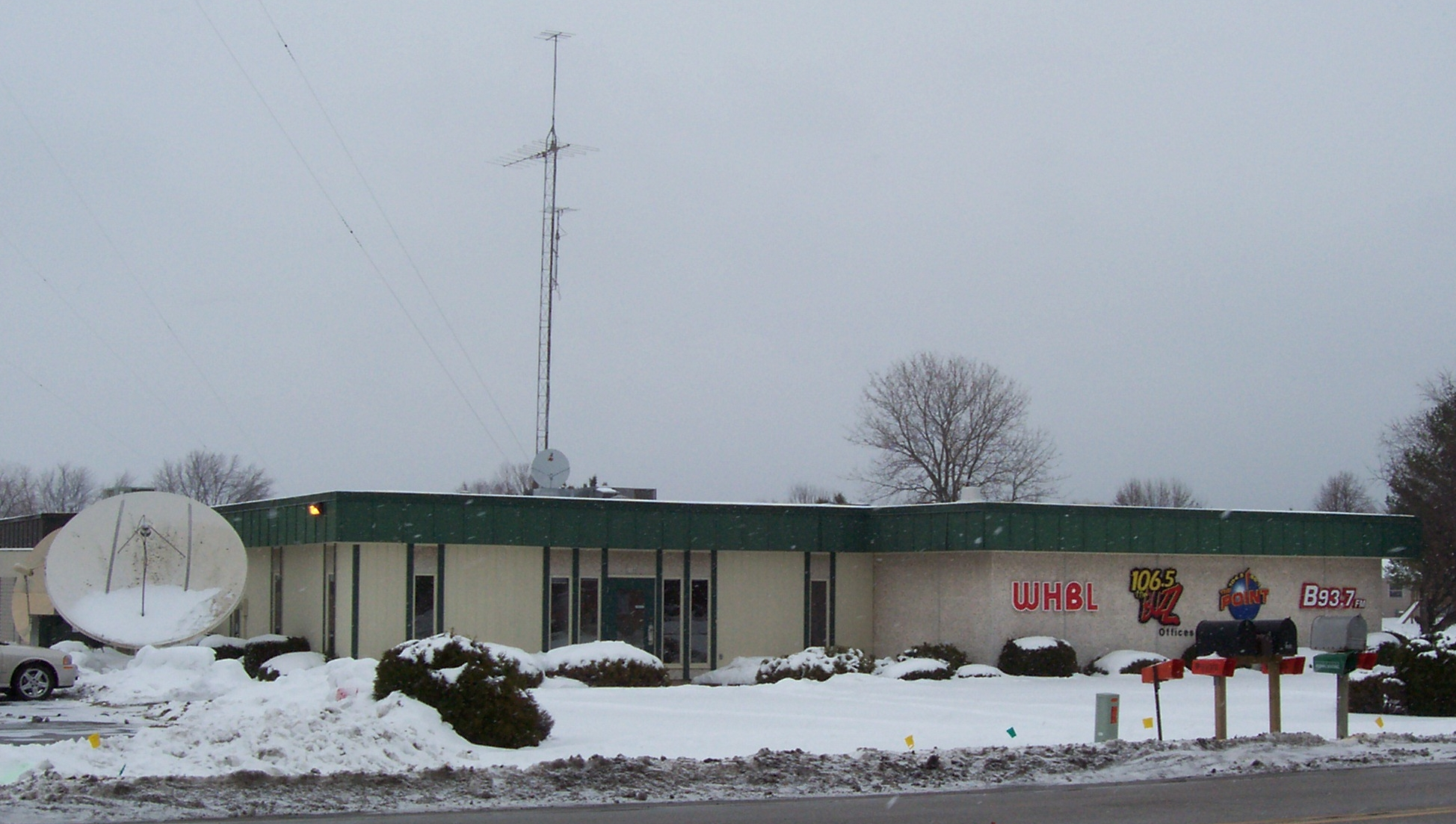
Studios

The station's programming is standard for an AM talk station, and organized, including imaging, in the same manner as Green Bay sister station WTAQ. It features a local morning show, Sheboygan's Morning News with Kelly Meyer, along with daily Focus on the Family commentary, and national conservative talk programs the rest of the day, including Dan Bongino, Sean Hannity, Mark Levin and Buck Sexton. The Clark Howard Show is at the end of the evening (along with a 'best-of' show on Sunday afternoons), followed by Coast to Coast AM nightly. The station also maintains local rights to the Glenn Beck Program, but only carries a weekend 'best-of' compilation of the daily series.

The station's weather forecasts are provided by WLUK-TV in Green Bay, a deal that was retained despite WLUK losing cable carriage in Sheboygan in 2011 due to outside corporate factors involving Fox programming.

Weekends consist mainly of general advice shows, including Kim Komando, Handel on the Law, Legal Defense with local attorney Kirk Obear via a brokered programming arrangement, the weekend best-of package of The Rush Limbaugh Show, and Leo Laporte's The Tech Guy, along with sports programs such as Pro Football Weekly and the regional outdoors show Outdoors Radio with Dan Small. Local church programming and The Lutheran Hour airs on Sunday morning, along with the polka-focused Polkatime America.

The station also carries Milwaukee Brewers baseball, Green Bay Packers football, Wisconsin Badgers football and men's basketball, and local high school sports. All programming on weekdays and weekends is subject to sports or breaking news pre-emption. It also previously hosted games played by the Sheboygan Red Skins back when they first existed in the National Basketball League and National Basketball Association before defecting from the latter league.

== History ==
WHBL was first licensed on March 5, 1925 to seventeen-year-old James H. Slusser in Logansport, Indiana. WHBL was an upgrade to Slusser's amateur radio station, 9EM, and he paid for the equipment with earnings from delivering newspapers. The call letters were randomly assigned from a sequential roster of available call signs, and Slusser adopted "We Heartily Boost Logansport" as the station's slogan.

The station was soon configured as a portable broadcasting station. Portable stations could be transported from place-to-place on movable platforms such as trucks. They were commonly hired out for a few weeks at a time to theaters located in small towns that didn't have their own radio stations, to be used for special programs broadcast to the local community. In early 1926 ownership was transferred to C. L. Carrell of Chicago, Illinois, joining a roster of what would ultimately become seven portable stations operated by Carrell. Starting on July 1, 1927, the station was reported to be operating from a Chicago, Milwaukee and St. Paul railcar, on a wave length of 205 meters [1470 kHz].

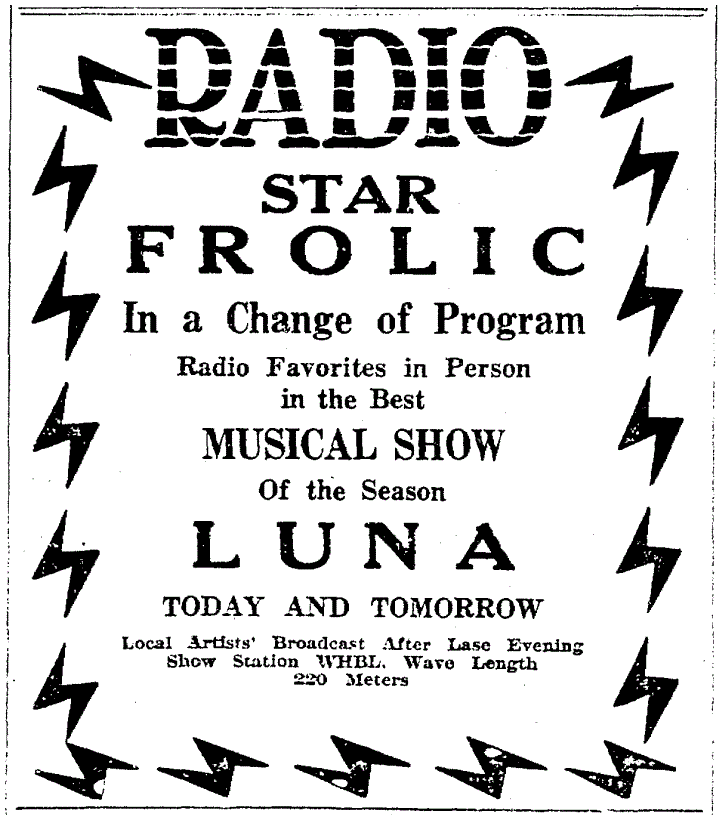
May 1925 advertisement promoting WHBL's theater broadcasts at Logansport, Indiana

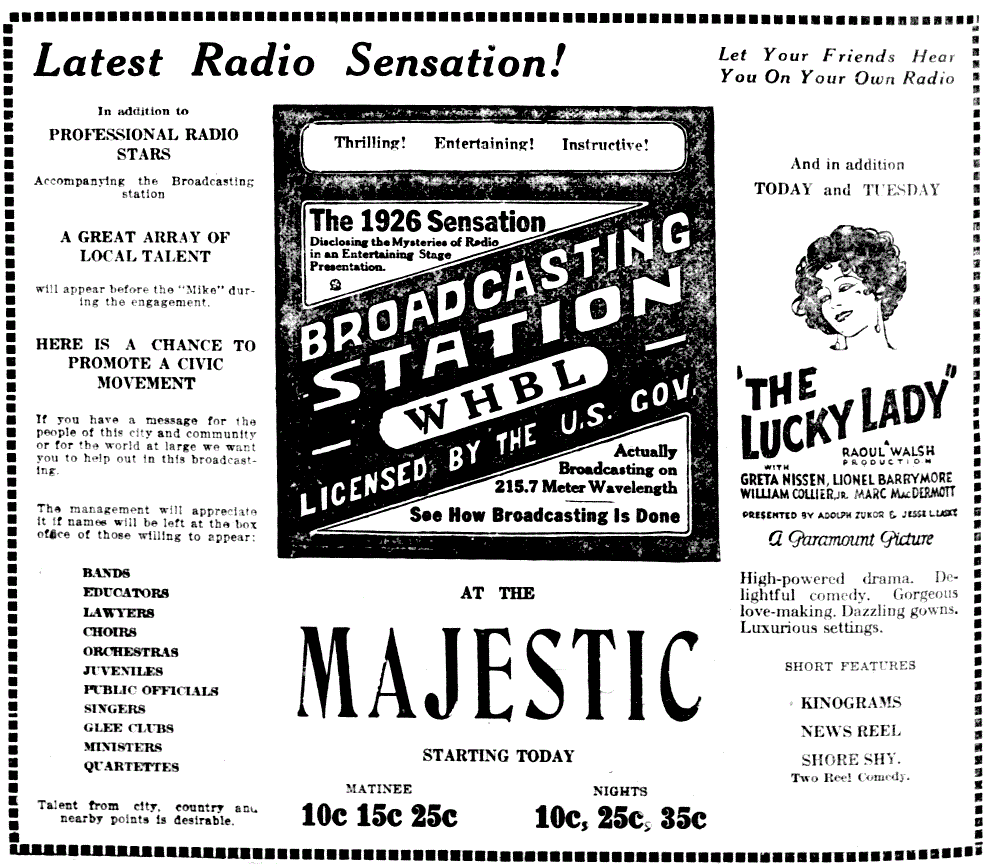
May 1926 advertisement promoting WHBL's theater broadcasts at La Crosse, Wisconsin

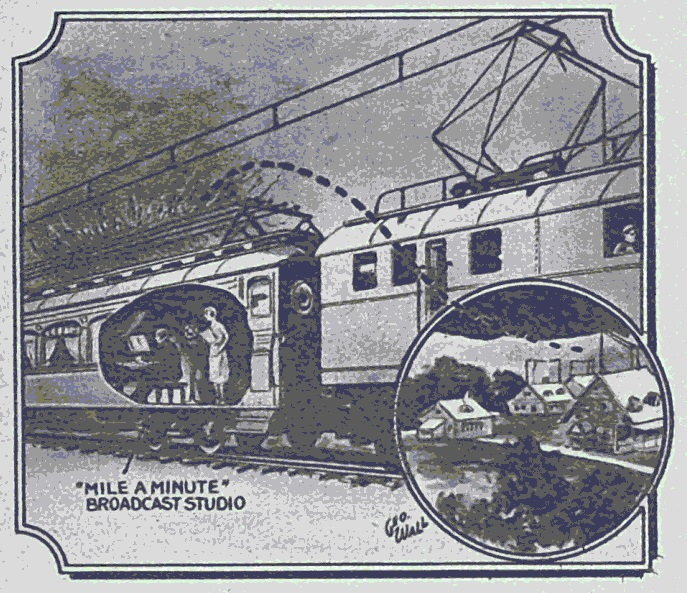
Beginning on July 1, 1927, WHBL was placed on a train railcar.

Regulating "moving targets" proved difficult, so in May 1928 the Federal Radio Commission announced it was ending the licensing of portable facilities. In early 1928 the Sheboygan Press made arrangements to have WHBL permanently moved to Sheboygan. WHBL was the third Carrell station sponsored by the Press to broadcast in Sheboygan. In April 1926, the newspaper arranged for station WIBJ to operate from the Van Der Vaart theater for a two week run, from the 5th until the 17th. Eighteen months later, in October 1927, the Press arranged for a second Carrell station, WHBM, to broadcast from the Eagles auditorium beginning on October 24, as part of the newspaper's "Radio Show and Home Exposition". This apparently was planned to be a more permanent endeavor, and WHBM continued to operate under the auspices of the newspaper following the close of the exposition. However, an unresolved financial dispute with the local musicians union resulted in the station being withdrawn at the end of the year.

Two months later, after reaching a settlement with the musicians, the Press brought in WHBL to restart operations. The debut broadcast took place at 7:30 p.m. on February 23, 1928, and editor Charles E. Broughton's opening statement summarized the events of the preceding months:

"Tonight we return to the air over WHBL, a new station taking the place of WHBM, which was closed December 30, owing to a ruling by the Musicians' Union establishing a minimum charge of $3 per person. When we announced in early December that the station would eventually close unless we had the wholehearted support of the union, there were many who felt it was an idle boast, but we were never more sincere. After the station was closed, radio fans in this and neighboring counties realized the loss to the community, and urged action on the part of the Musicians' Union for a more favorable rate.
"Under the date of January 24, after a conference with the editor of The Sheboygan Press, Sheboygan Musicians' Local No. 95 took action, reducing the minimum to one dollar, which was agreeable to us, and would have been from the very beginning. With that obstacle removed, we laid plans for again going on the air, but it required a lot of additional labor, on our part, as well as expense, for Station WHBM had been transferred to Oklahoma."

WHBL was now jointly owned by the Press Publishing Co. and C. L. Carrell. Two years later the publishing company assumed full ownership.

=== Jerry Bader controversy (2018) ===
Talk show host Jerry Bader was let go from Midwest Communications after his February 8, 2018 program, and he claimed his "never Trump" political stance had caused friction with station management, which ended his run on WHBL. WTAQ's John Muir was named the new mid-morning host by April 2018.

Bader had been with WHBL in some form since the 1980s, at first as the station's news director through the 1980s and most of the 1990s (outside of a year with WCNZ) until the 2000 purchase of WHBL by Midwest. Under new management, WHBL went from a full-service format to matching that of WTAQ, and Bader was groomed into a political talk show host. WHBL continued to carry the WTAQ version of the show live after he moved there in 2004, along with WSAU in Wausau, and Bader also had the title of program director for WTAQ. Bader has since left the broadcasting industry, attempting a new career as a Green Bay based religious leader.
