= Verhulst =

Verhulst is a Dutch toponymic surname. It is a contraction of "van der Hulst", meaning "from the (place where) holly (grows)". It may refer to:

- Adriaan Verhulst (1929–2002), Belgian historian, flamingant and freethinker
- Alfred Verhulst (1921–1975), American Air Force general
- Chris Verhulst (born 1966), American football player
- Davino Verhulst (born 1987), Belgian football player
- Dimitri Verhulst (born 1972), Belgian writer
- Frank Verhulst (born 1951), Dutch psychiatrist
- Gert Verhulst (born 1968), Belgian actor, film director and television presenter
- Hans Verhulst (1921–2005), Dutch sculptor and graphic designer
- Hobie Verhulst (born 1993), Dutch football goalkeeper
- Johannes Verhulst (1816–1891), Dutch composer, conductor, and music administrator
- Mayken Verhulst (1518–1599), Flemish painter
- Payton Verhulst (born 2003), American basketball player
- Pierre François Verhulst (1804–1849), Belgian mathematician
  - Verhulst equation and Verhulst diagram, named after him
- Raf Verhulst (1866–1941), Flemish poet and writer
- Rombout Verhulst (1624–1698), Flemish sculptor
- Stefaan Verhulst (born 1966), American technology writer
- Willem Verhulst (fl. 1625), director of the Dutch West India Company

== See also ==
- Dossier Verhulst, Dutch television drama series
