= Bemis Manufacturing Company =

American manufacturer of plastic products

- Company type: Private
- Industry: Injection molding, molded wood
- Founded: 1901
- Founders: Albert Bemis, Arthur White
- Headquarters: Sheboygan Falls, Wisconsin, United States
- Key people: Jeff Lonigro (CEO)
- Subsidiaries: BioBidet
- Website: www.bemismfg.com

The Bemis Manufacturing Company is an American manufacturing company based in Sheboygan Falls, Wisconsin, and is best known for its toilet seat products. Bemis also manufactures suction canisters, sharps waste containers, fluid management systems, gas caps, gauges and various contracted injection molded plastic parts for companies such as John Deere and Whirlpool Corporation. The company is a pioneer of co-injection molding, a process in which virgin resin is injected with scrap plastic.

Bemis's plastic work has won awards in the SPI Structural Plastics Div. design competition, particularly with the John Deere 7000 tractor, which is believed to represent the first instance of coinjection molding "to large parts where a recycled engineering material (ABS) is used in the core".

== History ==
In 1901, Arthur White incorporated White Wagon Works in Sheboygan Falls, Wisconsin, the precursor to Bemis that produced children's wooden wagons with a patented steering device. In the early 1920s, Al Bemis, with partner George Riddel, bought the majority of shares of White Wagon works and by 1928, Al Bemis took controlling interest in their shared company. In 1932, Bemis started producing toilet seats. By 1935, they started making seats for nearby Kohler Company.

== Management ==
Bemis CEO and part-owner Peter Bemis was inducted into the Plastics Hall of Fame on June 19, 2006, for innovative techniques for co-injection and other advance molding processes.

In June 2019, Jeff Lonigro was named as its new president and chief executive officer. Lonigro comes to the plastics and consumer goods manufacturer from Trilliant Food and Nutrition in Little Chute where he was vice president. Prior to joining Trilliant he spent 20 years at Illinois Tool Works, including as group president for the industrial welding platform.

== Products ==
Bemis Manufacturing Company is best known for its toilet seat products, which are produced under the Bemis, Mayfair, and Olsonite brands. While Olsonite is found primarily in wholesale markets, Mayfair and Bemis are found in retail stores such as Ace Hardware, Bed Bath & Beyond, Meijer and Do-It Best. Bemis and Mayfair by Bemis branded seats can be found in both wholesale markets and in retailers such as Home Depot, Lowe's and home improvement retailers in the UK including Homebase. Bemis also produces bathroom accessories in Europe under the Carrara & Matta brand.

Bemis produces custom plastics products for customers in commercial furniture, agricultural equipment, appliances, yard care, retail facility, and industrial products industries. Using technologies such as co-injection molding and extrusion, Bemis works with business partners to design and produce their products.

Since 1971, Bemis has produced various products for disposal of medical wastes, including sharps containers, suction canisters and liners, and a draining system for safe liquid management.

== Awards ==
- 2012 - Bemis was among three finalists in the 16th Plastics News' Processor of the Year Award.
- 2011 - The Target shopping cart, molded by Bemis, was a finalist in the Industrial Design Excellence Awards (IDEA)
- 2009 - Bemis Manufacturing won the 2009 International Plastics Design Competition Retail Award for the Target shopping cart.
- 2007 - Bemis Manufacturing took top honors at the SPI 2007 Alliance of Plastics Processors Awards for a high-end clothes dryer door window.
- 2006 - Bemis Manufacturing's Advance Technology Group won a Judges's award for the Sub Compact Utility Tractor and 9th Annual Industrial Designers Society of America/Plastics News Award for the John Deere Series 8000 Engine Enclosure.
