= Jedediah Brown =

American politician

Jedediah Brown was an American politician. He was a member of the Wisconsin State Assembly during the 1848 and 1849 sessions. A resident of Sheboygan Falls, Wisconsin, he represented Sheboygan County, Wisconsin. He was a Democrat.
