= WBFM =

- Sheboygan, Wisconsin; United States
- Broadcast area: Sheboygan County
- Frequency: 93.7 MHz
- Branding: Sheboygan's Country, B-93.7

Programming
- Format: Country music
- Affiliations: Compass Media Networks

Ownership
- Owner: Midwest Communications; (Midwest Communications, Inc.)
- Sister stations: WHBL, WHBZ, WXER

History
- First air date: 1972; 54 years ago
- Former call signs: WHBL-FM (1972–1977); WWJR (1977–1997)
- Former frequencies: 97.7 MHz (1972–1993)
- Call sign meaning: Its branding of B-93 FM

Technical information
- Licensing authority: FCC
- Facility ID: 9968
- Class: A
- ERP: 6,000 watts
- HAAT: 77 meters
- Transmitter coordinates: 43°43′14″N 87°44′4″W

Links
- Public license information: Public file; LMS
- Website: b93radio.com

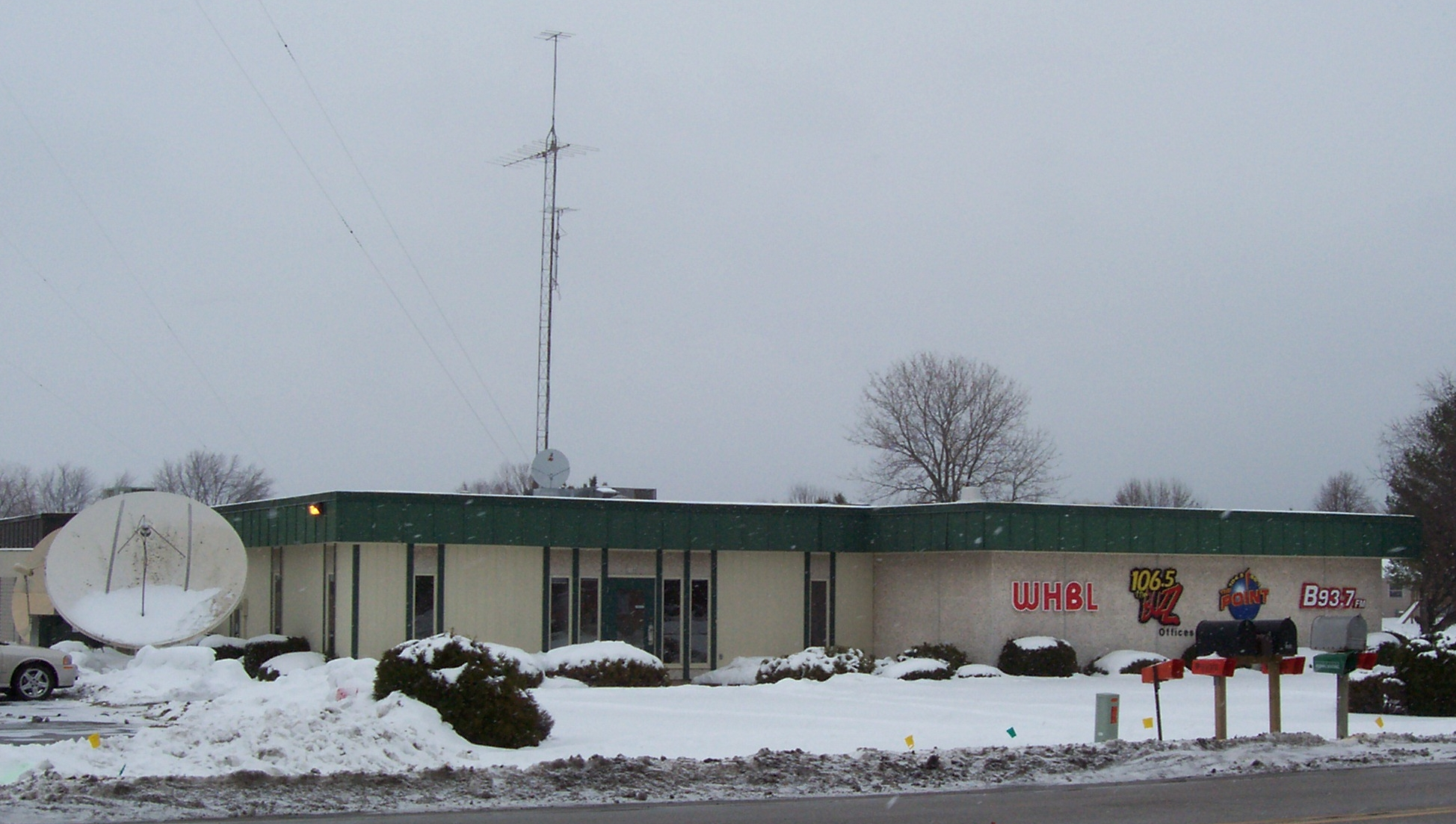
Studios

WBFM (93.7 FM) is a country music station licensed to Sheboygan, Wisconsin. WBFM is owned and operated by Midwest Communications under the sub-branding of Sheboygan Radio Group, which owns seven radio stations in Northeast Wisconsin and three other radio stations in the Sheboygan market. It shares studios with WHBL, WXER, and WHBZ on Washington Avenue in Sheboygan, with the station's transmitter and antenna based behind the studios.

== History ==
The station was created as the second iteration of heritage station WHBL's FM sister WWJR in 1993 as part of a large frequency swap in northeastern Wisconsin that also involved WKTT moving from 103.1 to 98.1, and WWJR from 97.7 to the new 93.7 frequency to facilitate the creation of Kaukauna-licensed WOGB on 103.1. For the first four years of 93.7's history as WWJR, it carried a basic adult contemporary format.

In early 1997, the Walton family, the longtime owners of WHBL and WWJR, acquired the license for a new station licensed to Sheboygan Falls at 106.5, which would transmit, like WHBL and WWJR, from their Washington Avenue three-tower array site on Sheboygan's south side. The Waltons determined that Sheboygan County was underserved by the lack of a locally based country music station, and at that time country listenership in the area was mainly split several ways in all areas of the county among WKTT and WCUB to the north from Manitowoc County, West Bend's WBWI-FM, and WMIL-FM from Waukesha-Milwaukee to the south.

On April 7, 1997, another frequency swap took place with the launch of 106.5. WWJR's format and calls were moved to 106.5, with 93.7 becoming a new radio country station, "B-93", taking the calls WBFM and mainly airing live programming during the day and voicetracked programming in the overnight hours. Officially, WBFM holds the FCC facility ID which originated with WWJR's original 97.7 facility in 1972.

WWJR would switch to an active rock format at the end of 2000 as "The Buzz" under the calls WHBZ, while WKTT would end up converting to adult contemporary as WLKN in 2003 as WBFM's stronger signal in Manitowoc reduced the ratings for WKTT after their launch, along with an intent to restore an adult contemporary format to a locally originated station.

Besides the purchase of the Walton stations by Midwest Communications in 2000, the addition of some voicetracked shifts from Midwest stations in Green Bay and Wausau, along with a current weather forecasting agreement with WLUK-TV in Green Bay, WBFM has remained relatively unchanged in format since April 1997. A minor change of branding with the decimal number was added in mid-2007 to avert any confusion with Milwaukee's WLDB (93.3), itself known for around two decades as "B93.3".
