= Hiram N. Smith =

American politician

Hiram N. Smith (February 19, 1817 – May 15, 1890) was an American farmer and politician.

Born in the township of Tinicum, Bucks County, Pennsylvania, Smith settled in Sheboygan Falls, Wisconsin Territory in 1847. Smith was a dairy farmer. Smith served on the town board and was a Republican. In 1871, Smith served in the Wisconsin State Assembly. He was also involved with the Wisconsin Dairymen Association. Smith was a regent of the University of Wisconsin and had suggested adding agricultural education to the University of Wisconsin. Smith died at his daughter's home in Sheboygan Falls, Wisconsin and had been in ill health.
