= Action Advertiser =

Action Advertiser, originally Action Advertising Co. and now officially known as Action Publications, is a newspaper based out of Fond du Lac, Wisconsin which features only "good news" along with retail, display and classified advertising. All Action products are free and delivered to homes in Fond du Lac, Dodge and Green Lake Counties, respectively. Action Publications newspapers, Action Sunday (Action Sunday West) and Action Advertiser were offered on Sunday and Wednesday. The Fond du Lac Reporter, Action Publication's sister paper, offers a daily news product.

Action Publications also has a commercial print division, Action Printing, established in 1973, which is a national printer of publications, manuals, directories and books, as well as other large-scale jobs. Its digital department offers small-scale short run printing capabilities. Darwin Bethke currently serves as general manager of Action Printing.

== Products ==
'Action Publications distributes a large number of products and special sections each year. The following are their core products:

- Action Sunday- A free "good news" newspaper for the Fond du Lac County area delivered every Sunday.
- Action Sunday West- A free "good news" newspaper for the area west of Fond du Lac, which includes Dodge, Green Lake and parts of Fond du Lac County.
- Action Advertiser- A free "good news" newspaper for the Fond du Lac County area delivered every Wednesday.
- Experience (formerly Maturity Times)- A free monthly publication geared towards those "mid-age and beyond."
- Clipper- A free coupon publication for Fond du Lac County.
- Waupun Book- A free yearly publication that includes news, events and photos from area clubs and organizations in and around Waupun
- Progress Edition- A free yearly publication that includes news and photographs from local businesses and organizations giving an update on their progress over the past year, plans for the future, and general news.

== History ==
Action Publications was started by Jim Carew and his family in 1970 in downtown Fond du Lac at 59 N. Main St. Action Printing, a division of Action Publications, was established in 1973. In 1980, Carew built a new facility on Rolling Meadows Drive, on the west side of Fond du Lac and moved the operation there. The Rolling Meadows facility underwent six expansions between 1980 and 1999 to keep up with the growing business. The facility is now in the excess of 100,000 sq. ft.. It was purchased by Gannett Company in 2002. At that time, Action had $25 million in revenue between the news division and the commercial print division. Action Printing in-house commercial printing produces large-scale projects (1000 copies and up) and their digital department offers short-run print capabilities. In 2009, The Reporter, also owned by Gannett, moved its offices to the Action Publications facility.

Timeline:

- 1970- Action Advertiser established at 59 N. Main St., first Action Advertiser, eight tabloid pages, published on Jan. 21, with 12,000 copies distributed.
- 1973- Action Printing opens at 61 N. Main St., Fond du Lac, next door to the newspaper office.
- 1980- 12,000 sq. ft. building built on Rolling Meadows Drive, first web press installed.
- 1986- Fond du Lac County Maturity Times, for seniors, begins distribution.
- 1989- In October, the first issues of the Action Sunday roll off the press.
- 1990- A second zone of the Action Sunday was added and delivered to Waupun, Ripon, and Markesan areas and called Action Sunday West
- 1991- A third expansion is added to the building, granting it an additional 53,000 sq. ft.
- 1994- Printed by Action Printing, Action Advertiser/Action Sunday became the first publication in the history of free papers to win back-to-back First Place General Excellence awards from both AFCP and IFPA.
- 1997- Jim Carew is presented with the Association of Free Community Papers Distinguished Service Award.
- 1998- Action completes a 45,000 sg. ft. addition to house printing equipment.
- 2002- The Gannett Company purchased Action Advertising from the Carew family.
- 2006- Action earned a "Best Workplace in the Americas" award from Master Printers if America (MPA) and Printing Industries of America (PIA)
- 2008- Action Publications Action Advertiser/Action Sunday won the General Excellence Award (first place) for the 2008 publication year.
- 2009- The Reporter relocated its operation into the Action's Rolling Meadows Dr. location.
- 2011- Printing and production of Action Sunday, Sunday West and Action Advertiser move to Appleton Production Facility.
- 2022- Printing and production of Action Sunday, Sunday West and Action Advertiser ceased, ended effectively on May 8, 2022.

== Awards ==
The Association of Free Community Papers awarded the General Excellence or Best of Show awards, the first free newspaper in history to receive the award back to back as the best free newspaper in North America. It has received the award over 20 times including the last six straight years. In 2008, it received the Wisconsin Community Papers General Excellence Award for newspapers with over 20,000 circulation, the fourth straight time it received the award. It received 33 awards for newspapers with over 10% news content.

Action Printing has received the National Association for Printing Leadership’s Gold Top Management Award in seven out of the past nine years.
