= WGNV =

Coordinates: 44°38′37″N 89°50′48″W

- Milladore, Wisconsin; United States
- Broadcast area: Wausau - Stevens Point - Wisconsin Rapids - Marshfield
- Frequency: 88.5 MHz
- Branding: The Family

Programming
- Format: Christian Adult Contemporary / Christian Talk and Teaching

Ownership
- Owner: Evangel Ministries, Inc.
- Sister stations: WEMI, WEMY

History
- First air date: 1986

Technical information
- Licensing authority: FCC
- Facility ID: 19877
- Class: C
- ERP: 50,000 watts
- HAAT: 178 meters
- Translators: 94.1 W231AS (Antigo); 107.3 W297AK (Waupaca)

Links
- Public license information: Public file; LMS
- Webcast: Listen Online
- Website: 885.thefamily.net

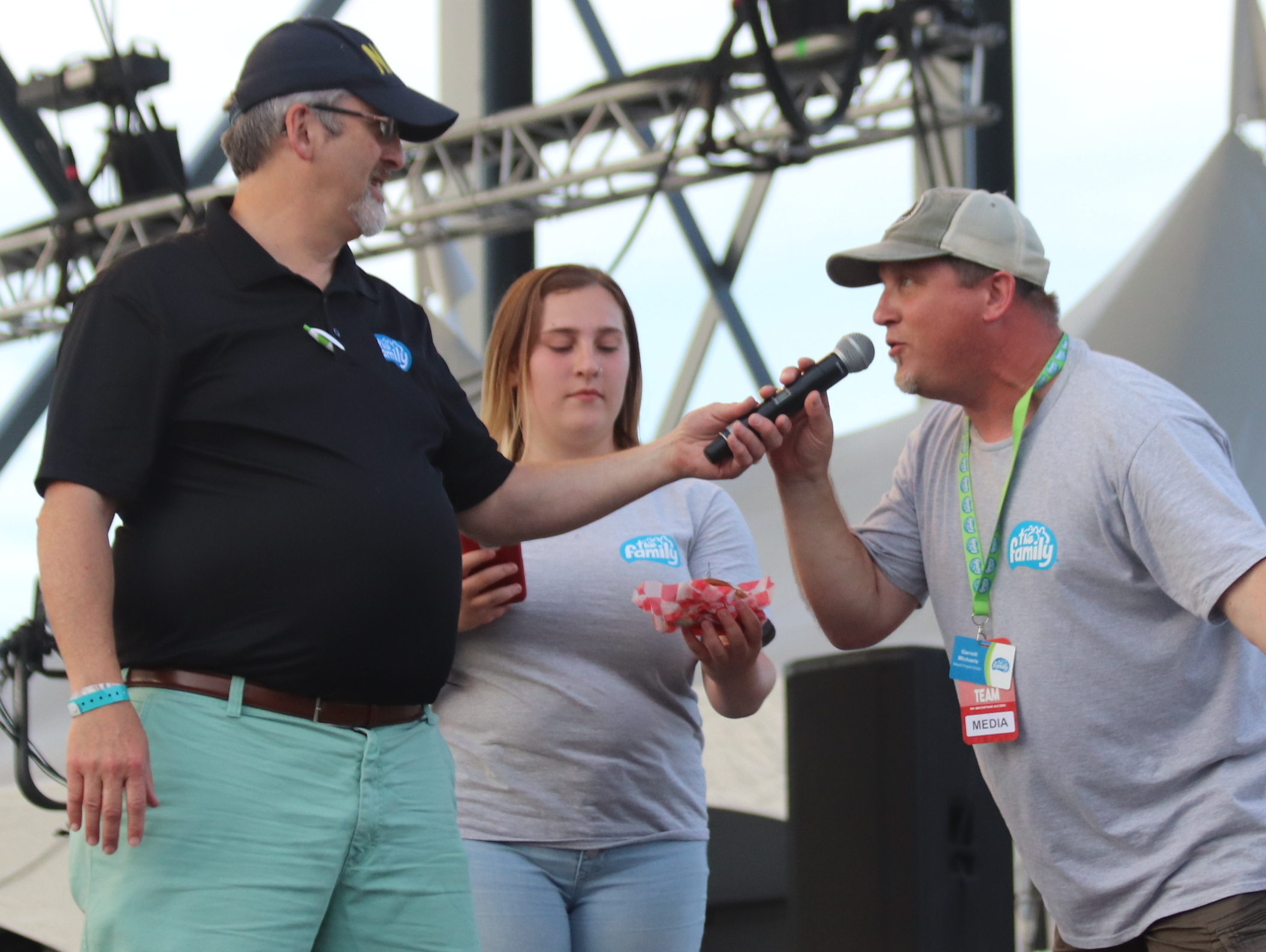
"The Family" DJs on stage at Lifest in 2019

WGNV (88.5 FM) is a Christian radio station licensed to Milladore, Wisconsin and serving the Wausau-Stevens Point area. The station's format consists of Christian adult contemporary music with some Christian talk and teaching. It is branded "The Family" radio network with stations WEMI and WEMY.

== Translators ==
Call sign	Frequency	City of license	FID	ERP (W)	Class	FCC info
W231AS	94.1 FM	Antigo, Wisconsin	144722	19	D	LMS
W297AK	107.3 FM	Waupaca, Wisconsin	144858	27	D	LMS
