= A. Matt Werner =

American politician and lawyer (1894–1977)

A. Matt Werner (February 19, 1894 – November 3, 1977) was an American politician, newspaper executive, and lawyer. He was a longtime executive of the The Sheboygan Press, and served on the Wisconsin Board of Regents for thirty years. He also served as Wisconsin state director of the National Recovery Administration and as city attorney of Sheboygan, Wisconsin.

== Biography ==
Werner was born in Kewaskum, Wisconsin on February 19, 1894.

Werner served as city attorney of Sheboygan, Wisconsin. He also served as the state director of National Recovery Administration. In the 1930s, he worked as general counsel for the Wisconsin alien property custodian.

Werner began working for The Sheboygan Press in 1947 as associate editor. In 1951, he was promoted to editor and president. In 1964, he was prompted to chairman of the newspaper company.

Werner served as a member of the University of Wisconsin Board of Regents from 1939 to 1969. His thirty years on the board was an unprecedentedly length tenure. He was first appointed by Governor Julius P. Heil in August 1934 to his first term. In April 1945, he was re-appointed by Governor Walter Samuel Goodland to an additional six-year term ending May 1, 1954. The Wisconsin Senate unanimously confirmed his re-appointment. He served as vice president for ten years of this tenure, and as its president for two years (1952–1954). His tenure ended when he resigned in March 1969.

Werner died November 3, 1977, at his home at the age of 83. He was survived by his wife, Dorothy Werner (née Bowler), four sons, one daughter, and twenty-five grandchildren. He had faced multiple hospitalizations in the six years prior to his death.

The University of Wisconsin–Madison has a journalism scholarship fund named for Werner.
