= WCLB =

Simulcast of WGXI, Plymouth
- Sheboygan, Wisconsin; United States
- Broadcast area: Sheboygan County
- Frequency: 950 kHz
- Branding: Cow Country

Programming
- Format: Classic country/rock

Ownership
- Owner: Mountain Dog Media/Randy Hopper; (RBH Enterprises, d/b/a Yellow Dog Broadcasting)
- Operator: Galaxie Broadcasting
- Sister stations: KFIZ, WFON

History
- First air date: January 1956 (as WSHE)
- Former call signs: WSHE (1956–1957); WKTS (1957–1993); WCNZ (1993–2000)
- Call sign meaning: When it had an adult standards format, the station was known on-air as "The Club"

Technical information
- Licensing authority: FCC
- Facility ID: 36423
- Class: D
- Power: 500 watts day 11 watts night
- Transmitter coordinates: 43°44′33.00″N 87°49′0.00″W
- Translator: 107.3 W297CK (Sheboygan)

Links
- Public license information: Public file; LMS
- Webcast: Listen live
- Website: cowcountry.us

WCLB (950 AM) is a radio station in Sheboygan, Wisconsin which airs a hybrid classic country/rock format simulcast from WGXI (1420) in Plymouth. WCLB's license is owned by Mountain Dog Media, a company owned by former State Senator Randy Hopper, with WGXI's owner, Galaxie Broadcasting, providing its programming from its studio facility on WI 57 in Plymouth.

The station is also translated via FM on W297CK (107.3), also licensed to Sheboygan. The station's AM transmitter is located in Sheboygan Falls, with W297CK's transmitter located behind the Sheboygan County Detention Center on Sheboygan's south side.

== History ==
=== WKTS era (1955–1990) ===
The station came on the air in 1956 as WSHE. They would soon ask for a call change to WKTL to stand for the Kettle Moraine range west of Sheboygan, but WHBL filed an objection to the calls, asserting the new calls sounded too alike and would cause issues with ratings diaries and branding. The station then chose the less-confusing WKTS calls in response. They would carry a general MOR format mixed with local talk, along with being a part of the Chicago Cubs Radio Network for several years.

Launching from a former gas station building in Sheboygan Falls, the station eventually moved its studios located to the second floor above a local office supply store in downtown Sheboygan, then the Walgreens building nearby. The station was a daytime-only operation until being authorized for night service by the FCC in 1987. WKTS moved to the corner of Union Avenue and South 12th Street in the early 1980s. The station stayed on the air as WKTS until 1991, when the ownership group was foreclosed by a local bank and the station was forced to go dark. An attempt by WKTS to acquire the open 93.7 FM allotment which eventually went to WBFM the next year had also failed to rescue the station.

Early owners included David A. Bensman, a prominent Sheboygan business man with interests in Two Rivers' The Free Press, the B&B Sound System, Radio and Record Center store, and Polkaland Records. Upon Bensman's death, the station was sold to Richard McKee and then later to long-time owners R. Karl Baker and his wife Jane, later sold to First Concord of Minnesota, headed by Steven T. Moravec for a short time, next to Sheboygan Broadcasting, headed by long-time Sheboygan announcer, Julian Jetzer.

=== Star/Marcus Cablevision era as WCNZ (1993–1997) ===
The station's license was next picked up by Don Jones' Star Cablevision (unrelated to the larger Cablevision corporation), the city's cable provider and a precursor company to Charter Communications. The station came back on the air on June 11, 1993 as WCNZ, airing an audio simulcast of CNN Headline News and local news updates during the network's local affiliate update time (:25/:55 after the hour), along with broadcasts of Sheboygan A's semi-pro baseball games and some high school sports, with coverage usually provided via simulcasts from Star Cablevision (later Marcus Cable)'s WSCS TV8 public access station. For a short time, WHBL's news director Jerry Bader moved to WCNZ as its news director and main on-air personality before being lured back to WHBL with a new contract which expanded his role with the station (and eventually springboarded him into a local daily talk show that eventually saw him moved to sister station WTAQ in Green Bay). Star had also purchased KFIZ AM/KFIZ-FM in Fond du Lac around the same time.

In 1997, WCNZ and the KFIZ stations were sold to Mountain Dog Media, the owners of WXER (104.5), upon the merger of Marcus Cable (which purchased Star Cablevision in 1994) into Charter Communications, which had no interest whatsoever in maintaining radio stations. Studios were merged with WXER's Falls Plaza facilities, and the station ended the Headline News simulcast by flipping back to its former MOR format.

=== Mountain Dog Media ownership as WCLB (1997–present) ===
==== "The Club" era (2000–2004) ====
On May 4, 2000, WCNZ changed their calls to WCLB, and then switched to an adult standards format as 950 The Club. Later, the station changed to oldies as "Cool 950". The station would remain so until January 3, 2004, when WCLB took an affiliation with ESPN Radio.

==== Sports talk era (2004–2018) ====
===== ESPN Radio (2004–2011) =====
Former logo as an ESPN Radio affiliate.

Local programming at the time consisted of an afternoon sports show based from Fond du Lac, while the station did not air ESPN Radio play-by-play broadcasts except for coverage of the Bowl Championship Series and NBA Finals due to a non-compete clause with Midwest Communications resulting from their sale of WXER and lasted until September 2010; with the end of the clause WCLB aired the 2010 MLB Playoffs for the first time, along with NFL and NCAA men's basketball tournament coverage from Westwood One. The station's offices were based at Fond du Lac sister operation KFIZ, with no local staff present in Sheboygan outside limited remote broadcasts.

====== Fox Sports Radio (2011–2018) ======
Former logo under Fox Sports Radio affiliation.

In March 2011, WCLB was dropped by ESPN Radio due to the network requesting monthly fees and clearance of their afternoon show and the refusal of Mountain Dog to do so to air their Fond du Lac-based afternoon program. The station was rebranded as 950 The Game and became an affiliate of Fox Sports Radio, replacing WHBL's weekends-only affiliation, along with a CBS Sports Radio affiliation for carriage of The Jim Rome Show. The local afternoon show was later ended due to a lack of listenership in both Fond du Lac and Sheboygan in 2018, though otherwise, WCLB was de facto a non-entity in a market dominated by Midwest Communications' four in-market stations.

By the end of the sports talk era for the station, the only programming not originated from either CBS or Fox Sports Radio was Saturday morning's Jerry Schneider Polka Show in a simulcast with KFIZ. The station also only featured national advertising from Fox Sports Radio, with that network's local breaks instead having national Ad Council public service announcements intended to be bedded over by local content being heard. The website was also seemingly dormant after the end of the local afternoon show, as a frame intended to show local content, along with the afternoon show's now-dormant Facebook presence was eventually taken over by the website of KFIZ. Also still visible was a November 2014 web poll question still asking for opinions regarding that month's trade of Marco Estrada from the Milwaukee Brewers to the Toronto Blue Jays.

In early August 2017, Mountain Dog Media filed for an FM translator within one of the FCC's AM revitalization translator windows, asking for a translator on 107.3 FM at 250 watts from the same site in Sheboygan Falls, which would allow the station a signal with far less interference, along with much more power at night than its 11 watt nighttime power on AM. The application for a construction permit (now under the calls W297CK) was approved on February 1, 2018.

W297CK began to carry programming on November 12, 2018; WCLB continued to originate Fox Sports Radio while testing the translator for a month further. In the interim period, Milwaukee's WRNW (97.3) converted from a CHR format to sports talk, including Fox Sports Radio programming overnights (itself a response to WKTI's switch to a simulcast of ESPN Radio affiliate WAUK), effectively making any attempt by WCLB to market as an automated FM sports talk station untenable in the long run.

==== Z107 era (2018–2023) ====
WCLB's logo from 2019 until 2023, referencing its translator in its branding rather than 950 AM.

Mountain Dog Media entered into an agreement with Martini Media in Oshkosh to operate and program the station in December 2018 with the launch of the FM translator; Martini had previously operated WBJZ in the Oshkosh area in lieu of another owner for ten years before Woodward Communications purchased the station in June 2018 and converted it to a simulcast of active rock station WZOR in Mishicot. On December 9, 2018, the Fox Sports Radio programming was dropped and replaced by Martini's Rhythmic Top 40 format, which features that company's personalities voice-tracking programming from Oshkosh and their home studios, though the Jerry Schneider Polka Show remained on Saturday mornings. It also placed it into competition with former sister station WXER, which continues to maintain near the same format it had when it was sold in 2005.

Though it had limited success, Z107 was hamstrung by several issues, including a lack of local advertisers, concerts, and events to promote (with many locked into exclusive regional contracts with Midwest Communications and its stations), along with technical issues, including loss of Internet service, which knocked the station off the air for days or weeks at a time. As described below, the 107.3 translator has limited coverage compared to the Midwest stations, and in practice, barely served the Sheboygan metropolitan statistical area, with its signal coverage fading out at the line between the towns of Sheboygan Falls and Plymouth, requiring the station to advertise its availability through smart devices outside the translator's limited range. The AM transmitter has also become a de facto afterthought with the FM translator, with its own signal range decreased over time due to deferred maintenance, a growing issue with AM stations with FM translators or simulcasts.

==== Simulcast with WGXI (2024–present) ====
Over the last week of 2023, Martini Media wound down the programming agreement with Mountain Dog and the station went silent over the New Year's weekend into 2024. During the afternoon of January 2, 2024, the station came back on the air, now simulcasting the classic country format of Galaxie Broadcasting's WGXI (1420) of Plymouth, known as Cow Country, including the 107.3 FM translator. WGXI's co-owner, Dave Hendrickson, had been an on-air personality on WXER before WCLB's sale to Mountain Dog, and took on additional duties with WCLB before moving on to what was then WJUB in the early 2000s.

There has been no paperwork regarding a sale of WCLB to Galaxie Broadcasting, although the simulcast consolidates the two commercial Sheboygan County stations not owned by Midwest Communications into one unit. It also brings a solid FM signal for WGXI into Sheboygan via the FM translator; though WGXI has a translator of its own at 98.5 FM in Plymouth, it has limited reach into Sheboygan. The arrangement was announced on January 9 after a soft launch through WGXI's social media channels.

== Technical details ==
The station has used a three-tower directional facility in Sheboygan Falls since its launch in the 1950s, located off Forest Avenue near the interchange between Highways 23 and 32. The station receives heavy interference due to the factors of cell phone traffic from towers nearby interfering with the signal, and the need to reduce the signal at night in order to protect WWJ of Detroit and Chicago's WSFS, also both at 950. WCLB's after-dusk license power is eleven watts, thus it can barely be heard in its city of license without interference, and why the FM translator is all but critical for the station's operation and existence. Even with the translator though, its signal reach is half of the translators of WXER and WHBL, who are based on WHBL's three-tower array and transmit at twice the height of that of W297CK's leased tower on Sheboygan's south side.
