= The Sheboygan Press =

Daily newspaper in Sheboygan, Wisconsin

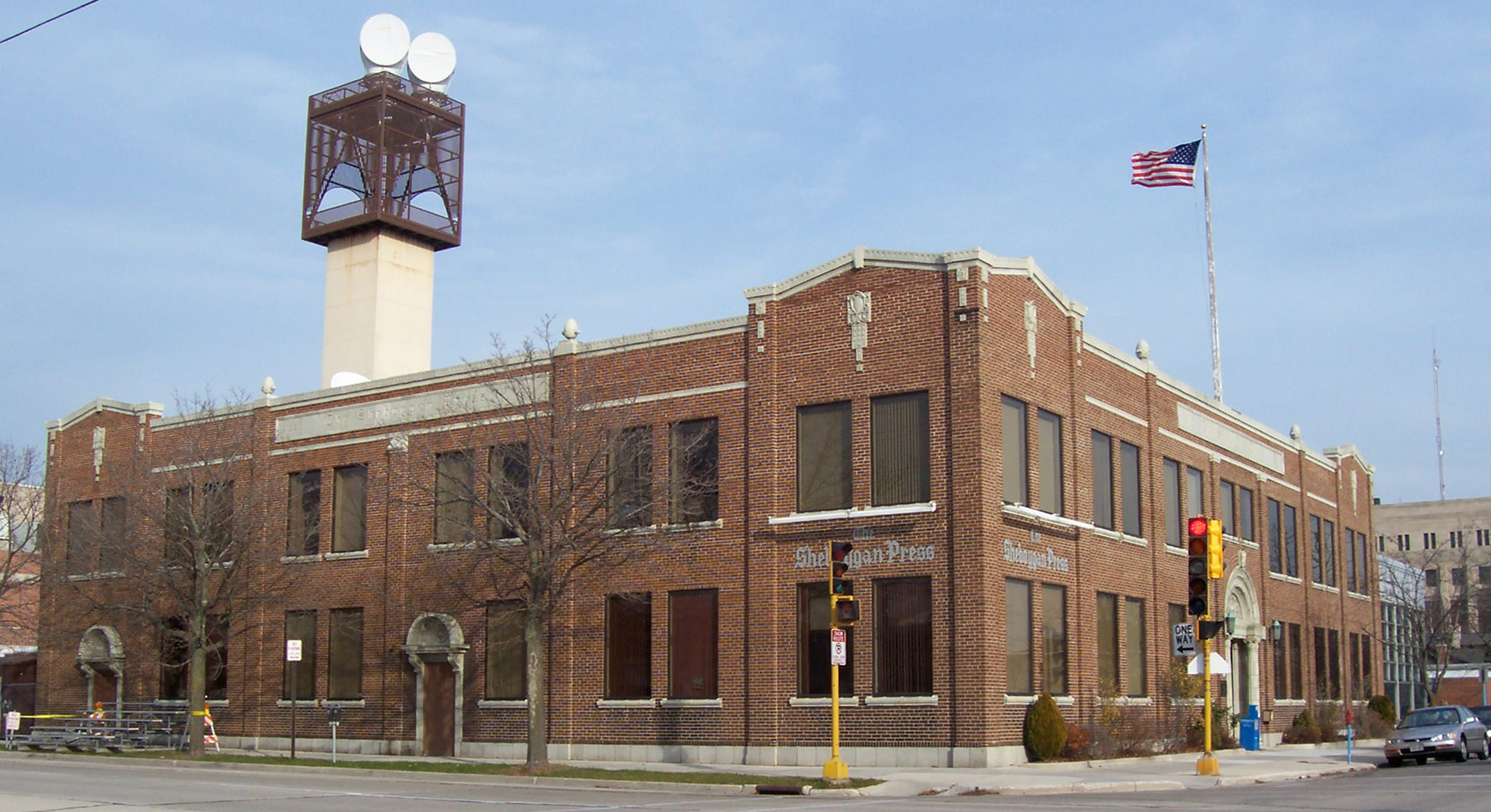
- The former headquarters building for the Press from 1924 to 2019.
- Type: Daily newspaper
- Format: Broadsheet
- Owner: USA Today Co.
- Publisher: Andy Fisher
- Editor: Matt Piper
- Founded: 1907; 119 years ago (as The Sheboygan Daily Press)
- Circulation: 4,600 (as of 2022)
- Website: sheboyganpress.com

The Sheboygan Press is a daily newspaper based in Sheboygan, Wisconsin, United States. It is one of a number of newspapers in the state of Wisconsin owned by USA Today Co., including the Milwaukee Journal Sentinel, Green Bay Press-Gazette and Appleton's The Post-Crescent, along with the nearby Herald Times Reporter of Manitowoc. The Sheboygan Press is primarily distributed in Sheboygan County.

The Sheboygan Press also publishes the Shoreline Chronicle, a free shopper paper, the Citizen, a weekly free "best-of" edition of the Press, Moxie, which features articles and news about senior citizens, and the Today's Real Estate local realty listings magazine.

== History ==
The Sheboygan Press began on December 17, 1907, with the first edition of The Sheboygan Daily Press. At the time the area was mainly dominated by the local German language newspapers in line with the city's heavy German immigrant population, which was the main source of news in the community until after World War I and the rise of Americanization, when eventually the Press ended up the lone English-language publication in the community through a line of mergers and foldings of other papers. Daily would be removed from the nameplate as time went on.

Eventually the paper enlisted the financial help of Charles H. Weisse, a Sheboygan Falls businessman and congressman, who hired Charles E. Broughton as editor in 1908. Ownership was shared with the Bowler family, who had invested in the paper in 1912. The Press grew in circulation over the decades, outgrowing three older buildings already existing downtown before moving into their current purpose-built building at the intersection of Center Avenue and North 7th Street in 1925. Broughton's influence remains in the community, with the north side road along the Lake Michigan shoreline named Broughton Drive in his honor as part of campaigns by him and his wife and the paper for beautification of the community.

In 1927, the newspaper founded radio station WHBL (1330), which remained with the company until the 1950s.

The paper continued to be locally owned by the Bowler and extended Werner families until 1986, when The Press was sold to Ingersoll Publications. The Press added a Sunday edition on October 18, 1987. The paper was sold to the Thomson Corporation in January 1990. In May 1998, The Sheboygan Press' 50-year-old letterpress was retired, which remained in the building until it was disassembled in 2012. Around this same time the publication converted from an afternoon newspaper, which it had been for its entire existence, to morning delivery in line with the decline of afternoon papers in general. Since then, the paper was printed by the facilities of The Reporter of Fond du Lac until its closure in 2009, then under contract with the Milwaukee Journal Sentinel from 2009 until September 2013, when The Post-Crescent in Appleton began to print all of Gannett's northeastern Wisconsin publications. Upon the Journal Sentinel becoming a part of Gannett in April 2016, the Press and its publications returned to being printed there; all Gannett newspapers in the eastern part of the state began to be printed from Milwaukee in April 2018 with the closing of the Appleton facility. That facility itself was closed in 2022, and Gannett's Wisconsin publications are now printed out of the Peoria Journal-Star facility in Peoria, Illinois.

Gannett purchased The Sheboygan Press in August 2000 as part of its purchase of the Thomson newspaper assets, making it part of their network of newspapers in the northeastern and north-central parts of Wisconsin, with collaborative publications and efforts between the publications occurring often. The newspaper's website, which began as a bare-bones effort in 1998, eventually took on most of the features found on most Gannett newspaper sites. The company's main small-market "eight free articles per month" subscription model took effect on the Press's website on June 26, 2012.

Gannett placed the Press building on the market in May 2013, citing that the newspaper's current operations only take up an eighth of the building's existing square footage. In the summer of 2019, the paper moved out of the building to offices based out of the U.S. Bank building across the street, and the Press building was remodeled to serve as apartments. In 2023 the paper moved to even smaller facilities out of Lakeland University's "Jake's" facilities, which were the former offices of Jacobson/Rost.

In March 2024, Gannett announced the end of carrier delivery for most of its newspapers, and the Press is now delivered to subscribers fully by mail.

== Images ==
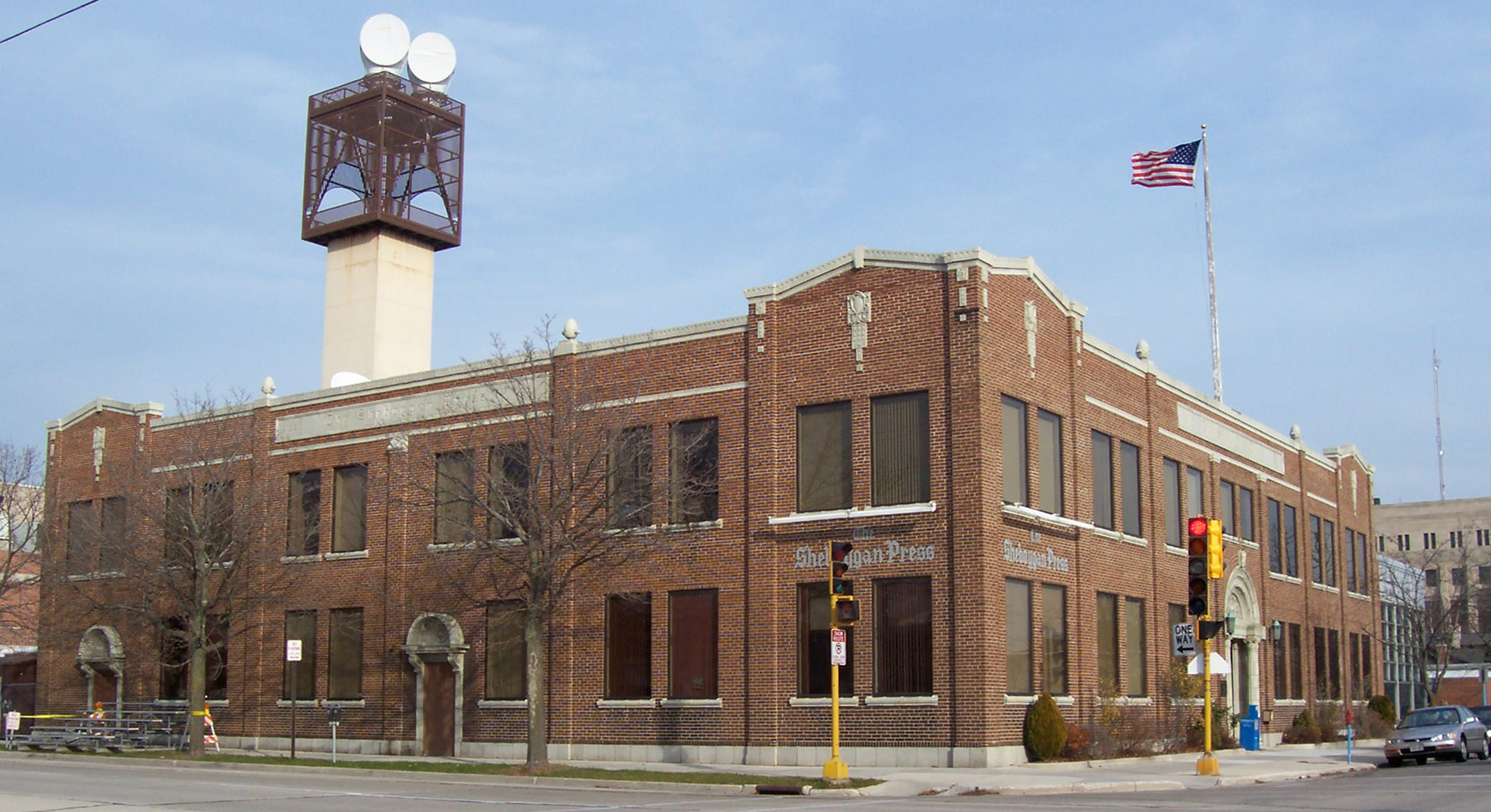
Building

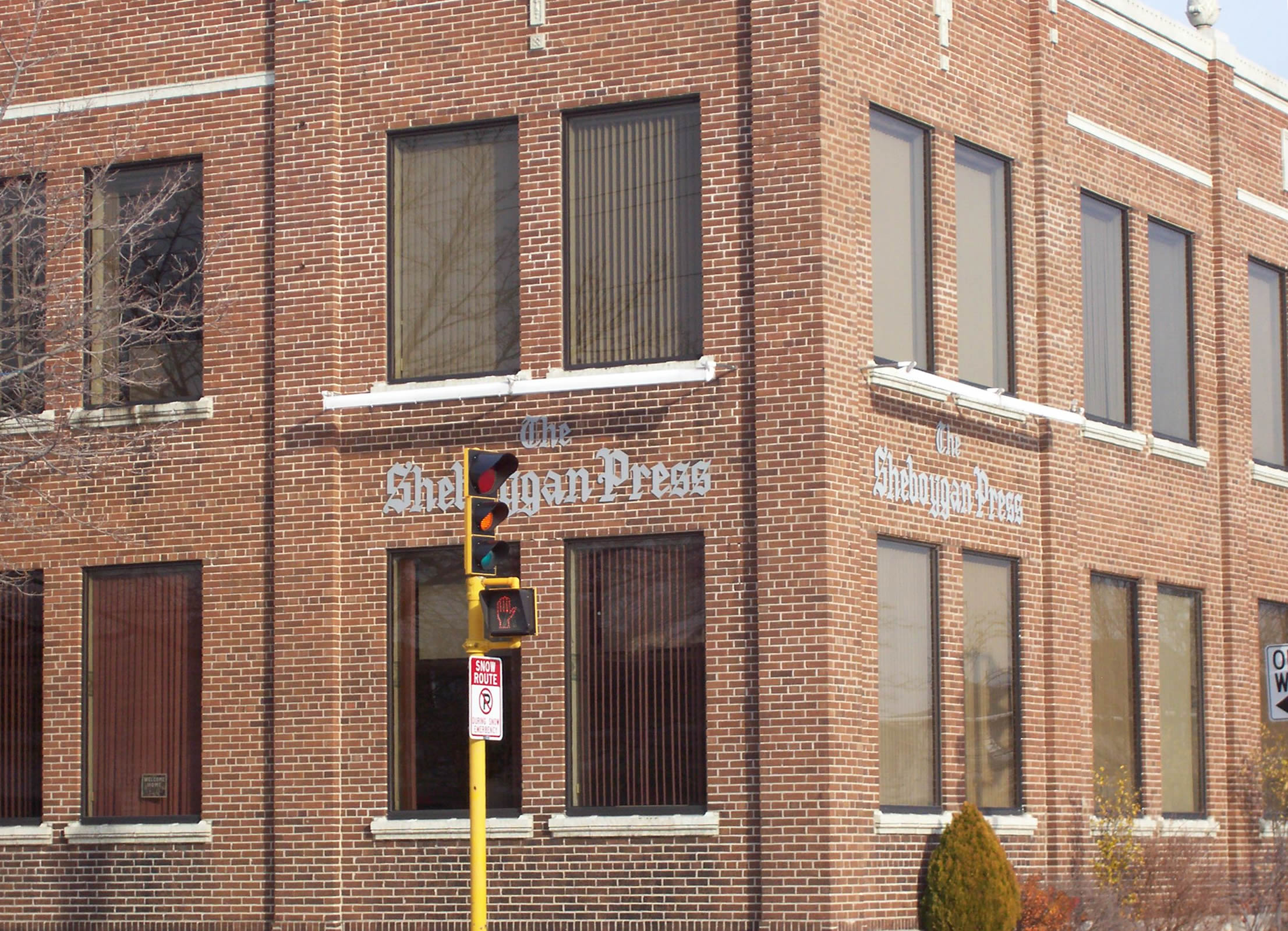
Building

== See also ==
- A. Matt Werner, longtime executive
