= Martin O. Galaway =

American politician

Martin O. Galaway (December 27, 1862, in Sheboygan Falls, Wisconsin – January 5, 1955, in Sheboygan County, Wisconsin) was a member of the Wisconsin State Assembly. He was elected to the Assembly in 1898 and again in 1900 as a member of the Republican Party.
