= WEMI (FM) =

Coordinates: 44.2547084°N 88.4370513°W

- Appleton, Wisconsin; United States
- Broadcast area: Fox Cities
- Frequency: 91.9 MHz
- Branding: The Family

Programming
- Format: Christian Adult Contemporary / Christian Talk and Teaching

Ownership
- Owner: Evangel Ministries, Inc.
- Sister stations: WEMY, WGNV

History
- Call sign meaning: Evangel Ministries, Inc.

Technical information
- Licensing authority: FCC
- Facility ID: 19878
- Class: A
- ERP: 3,100 Watts
- HAAT: 100 meters

Links
- Public license information: Public file; LMS
- Webcast: Listen Online
- Website: thefamily.net

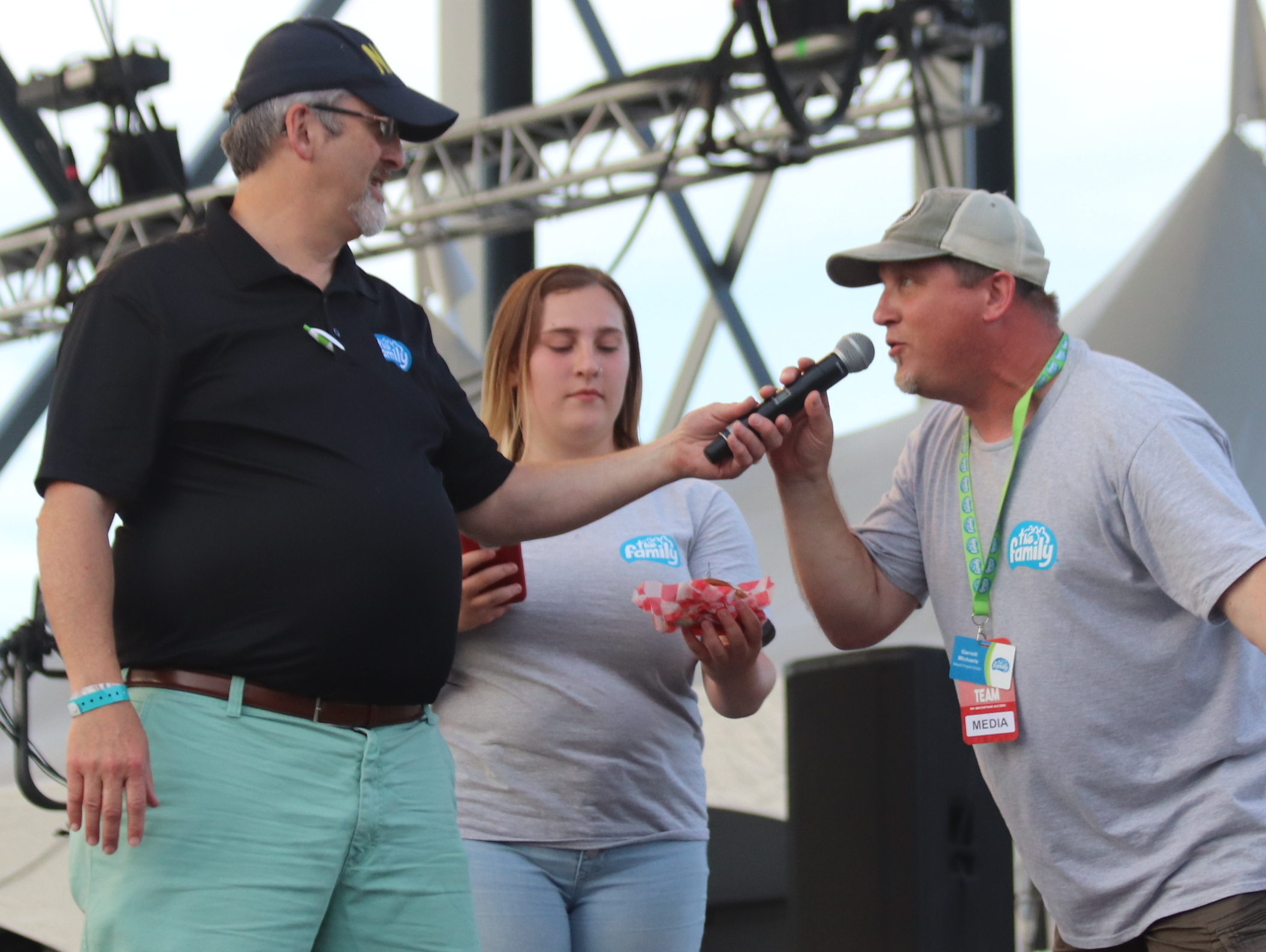
"The Family" DJs on stage at Lifest in 2019

WEMI (91.9 MHz) is a Christian FM radio station licensed to Appleton, Wisconsin serving the Fox Cities. WEMI is also heard in Fond du Lac and Ripon through translators on 101.7 FM. WEMI's format consists of Christian adult contemporary music with some Christian talk and teaching. WEMI is owned by Evangel Ministries, Inc. and also owns radio station WEMY 91.5 FM in Green Bay with a translator station in Two Rivers, WI 107.5 FM. Evangel Ministries, Inc. also owns WGNV 88.5 FM in central Wisconsin, with translator stations in Antigo, WI at 94.1 FM. and Waupaca WI at 107.3 FM.

== Translators ==
Call sign	Frequency	City of license	FID	ERP (W)	Class	FCC info
W269AZ	101.7 FM	Fond du Lac, Wisconsin	84360	80	D	LMS
W269BG	101.7 FM	Ripon, Wisconsin	144832	38	D	LMS
