= WFON =

- Fond du Lac, Wisconsin; United States
- Frequency: 107.1 MHz
- Branding: 107.1 The Bull

Programming
- Format: Country
- Affiliations: Packers Radio Network

Ownership
- Owner: Mountain Dog Media/Randy Hopper; (RBH Enterprises, Inc.)
- Sister stations: KFIZ; WCLB

History
- First air date: 1967
- Former call signs: WFON (1967–1993); KFIZ-FM (1993–2004)
- Call sign meaning: Fond du Lac

Technical information
- Licensing authority: FCC
- Facility ID: 36420
- Class: A
- ERP: 6,000 watts
- HAAT: 91 meters
- Transmitter coordinates: 43°50′20″N 88°22′8″W

Links
- Public license information: Public file; LMS
- Webcast: Listen live
- Website: www.107thebull.com

WFON (107.1 FM) is a radio station licensed to Fond du Lac, Wisconsin. The station is owned by RBH Enterprises, Inc.

== History ==
The station was originally owned by Lola Beckmann, and the original WFON studios were in the building that now houses a daycare.

== Programming ==
The station airs all games of the Green Bay Packers as a member of the Packers Radio Network.
