= The Reporter (Fond du Lac, Wisconsin) =

Daily newspaper in Fond du Lac, Wisconsin, U.S.

- The July 27, 2005 front page of The Reporter
- Type: Daily newspaper
- Format: Broadsheet
- Owner: USA Today Co.
- Publisher: Andy Fisher
- Editor: Katy Macek
- Founded: 1870 (as the Daily Commonwealth)
- Headquarters: N6637 Rolling Meadows Drive, Fond du Lac, Wisconsin 54936 United States
- Circulation: 3,240 (as of 2022)
- Website: fdlreporter.com

The Reporter is a daily newspaper based in Fond du Lac, Wisconsin owned by USA Today Co. It serves primarily Fond du Lac and northern Dodge County in East Central Wisconsin.

== History ==
The Reporter traces its founding to August 22, 1870 when the Fond du Lac Commonwealth, which had been a weekly newspaper since 1856, began daily circulation. However, the first incarnation of the Fond du Lac Daily Reporter did not start until 1883, when L. A. Lange founded a new newspaper for Fond du Lac to compete with the Commonwealth, publishing Monday through Saturday. This was the first paper to have a telegraph line in the Fond du Lac area, giving it a slight advantage over competing papers, with most eventually folding during the rest of the 19th and early 20th centuries.

In 1917, L. A. Lange was succeeded by his son A. H. Lange as publisher of the Daily Reporter, beginning a tradition of Lange family involvement with operations throughout the rest of the 20th century.

In 1926, the Fond du Lac Daily Commonwealth and Fond du Lac Daily Reporter merged to become the Fond du Lac Commonwealth Reporter. Its offices and presses were located at 18 West First Street. It would continue to be known as such until the 1970s, when "Commonwealth" was dropped from the nameplate. In the mid-1920s, the Commonwealth Reporter took ownership of radio station KFIZ, and launched the short-lived KFIZ-TV (channel 34) from 1970 until 1972.

In 1970, the paper was sold to Thomson Newspapers, which erected a new building at the corner of West Second and Macy Streets in Fond du Lac. It was also during this time that the Saturday evening edition of the paper was switched to a Sunday morning delivery.

In 1998 and 1999, a nearly 60,000-square-foot (5,600 m^{2}) addition was added to the present building to increase printing operations. In 2000, Thomson sold their newspaper interests to Gannett to concentrate on financial news and data. The additional press capacity was then used to print publications for nearby sister newspaper The Sheboygan Press, after that publication's older presses at their Sheboygan facilities broke down in mid-1998, and were judged to be too obsolete to repair.

Gannett eventually downsized their Fond du Lac operations upon the 2009 purchase of the parent company of Action Advertiser, a local shopper paper which also did contract publishing, moving out of downtown to an expansion of the Action Advertiser offices near the I-41/WI 23 interchange on September 20, 2009. This necessitated the move of The Reporter from publishing in-house to out of Gannett's Appleton facilities for the Post-Crescent, with the Oshkosh Northwestern also following suit. Publication of Sheboygan Press subsequently moved to Milwaukee under a contract with the Milwaukee Journal Sentinel until 2014, when Press publications were also printed out of Appleton (Gannett purchased the Journal Sentinel in April 2016; that latter paper now publishes all state Gannett publications as of the spring of 2018 when the Appleton printing facility was made redundant and closed down, including The Reporter).

As of 2015, the operations of Action Advertiser and The Reporter are branded together as Action Reporter Media.
