= KFIZ-TV =

Television station in Fond du Lac, Wisconsin (1968–1972)

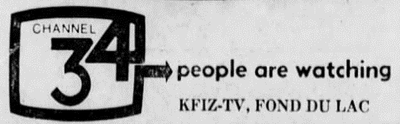
- Fond du Lac, Wisconsin; United States
- Channels: Analog: 34 (UHF)
- Branding: Channel 34

Programming
- Affiliations: Independent (primary); NET/PBS (secondary)

Ownership
- Owner: KFIZ Broadcasting Company
- Sister stations: KFIZ (AM)

History
- First air date: August 1, 1968
- Last air date: November 30, 1972

Article featuring KFIZ-TV from an International Video Corporation Publication

KFIZ-TV, UHF analog channel 34, was an independent television station licensed to Fond du Lac, Wisconsin, United States that operated from August 1, 1968, to November 30, 1972. The station was a sister station to KFIZ radio, and covered an 11-county area in east-central Wisconsin. Both stations were owned by RK Communications, parent company of Fond du Lac's daily newspaper, the Fond du Lac Reporter. Although this was contrary to regulations, the owners were "grandfathered" due to their cross-media ownership pre-dating the regulations.

Given the expense of broadcast quality equipment at the time, KFIZ-TV had to operate with severe limitations. Initially, only programming on 16mm film could be shown in color. Its three studio cameras were black and white, as was its only video tape machine. Later, two color cameras were purchased from International Video Corporation, as well as a color video tape machine (albeit in a non-standard 1" helical-scan format). Thus the only video taped programs that could be broadcast in color were locally produced.

The transmitter was located north of Fond du Lac near the unincorporated community of Johnsburg. It was operated via remote control. The tower, transmitter building, and downtown studios have since been razed. The transmitter site is now part of the Blue Sky Green Field Wind Farm.

A significant amount of local programming was produced outside of the studio (local sports, civic events, etc.). This required cameras, associated control equipment, and (later) the 1" helical-scan video tape machine to be removed from the studio and put in the station's truck.

For live remote broadcasts, the truck was equipped with a microwave transmitter. If the remote site was within the immediate Fond du Lac area, the signal could be sent directly to the downtown master control. If the site was too far away, the truck's signal would be sent to the transmitter (due to its height and height above average area terrain). An engineer would need to be posted at the transmitter to switch input between master control and the remote site.

Some of its programming was relayed from the over-the-air signal of Milwaukee stations. This was accomplished by building a private microwave relay system consisting of a tower near Slinger which captured the over the air signal of the desired station. From there the signal was relayed via Microwave to a repeater tower near Byron, and finally to the KFIZ master control in downtown Fond du Lac. The motivation for this unique arrangement was two-fold. First, for sports programming (e.g. Milwaukee Brewers) and the occasional network program which had been cleared (i.e.: not broadcast) by an affiliate, KFIZ could not afford the rates then charged by AT&T for microwave relay service. Second, for syndicated programming (e.g. Kup's Show), KFIZ did not have a (then standard) 2" Quad Video Tape Machine with color capabilities. Using the over-the-air system forced KFIZ to schedule such programming at the same time as Milwaukee stations.

For part of the day, the station simulcast educational programming from WHA-TV in Madison, which it began in September 1971.

Fond du Lac is located equidistant from Milwaukee, Madison and Green Bay, and KFIZ-TV had to compete with major network affiliates from those cities for viewers. However, the station's close proximity to Milwaukee and Green Bay was attractive to the University of Wisconsin-Madison, which was looking for a way to get programming from its educational television station, WHA-TV, into those cities. UW-Madison signed a contract with RK Communications calling for channel 34 to simulcast WHA-TV for part of its broadcast day.

When the owners of RK Communications decided to sell the entire company, the combination of what was now simply the Reporter and KFIZ-AM-TV lost its grandfathered protection, forcing RK Communications to sell the newspaper and broadcasting properties to separate buyers. While buyers were found for the newspaper and the radio station, there were no takers for the money-losing TV station. Earlier, the station had lost significant revenue when the Wisconsin Educational Communications Board decided to turn WHA-TV into a statewide public television network (what evolved into Wisconsin Public Television, now PBS Wisconsin). WPNE-TV in Green Bay was the first spoke in the network, launching on September 12, 1972. Fond du Lac is part of the Green Bay market, and WPNE's sign-on took away a considerable part of the station's broadcast day and its revenue. Under the circumstances, KFIZ-TV went off the air on November 30, 1972. KFIZ-TV's former antenna and transmitter were subsequently sold to PBS member station WNIT in South Bend, Indiana, a station which was founded in December 1972 and first went on the air in February 1974, also on channel 34.
