= Alfred Verhulst =

United States Air Force general

- Born: 1921; Sheboygan Falls, Wisconsin.U.S.
- Died: December 23, 1975 (aged 53–54)
- Military career
- Allegiance: United States
- Branch: United States Army
- Rank: Brigadier General
- Units: 39th Trooper Carrier Squadron; 437th Troop Carrier Group
- Commands: 438th Fighter-Bomber Group; 434th Tactical Airlift Wing
- Conflicts: Second World War: Philippines Campaign (1944–45); Battle of Okinawa

Alfred Verhulst (1921–1975) was a brigadier general in the United States Air Force.

He was born in Sheboygan Falls, Wisconsin, in 1921. He died on December 23, 1975.

== Career ==
Verhulst originally enlisted in the United States Army Air Forces in 1942. He was commissioned an officer the following year. During World War II he served with the 39th Trooper Carrier Squadron. Conflicts he took part in include the Philippines Campaign (1944–45) and the Battle of Okinawa. Following the war he was assigned to the 437th Troop Carrier Group. In 1956 he was given command of the 438th Fighter-Bomber Group. Later in his career he was given command of the 434th Tactical Airlift Wing and was named Vice Commander of the Air Force Reserve.

Awards he received include the Legion of Merit, the Air Medal with oak leaf cluster, the Presidential Unit Citation, the Armed Forces Reserve Medal with hourglass device, and the Small Arms Expert Marksmanship Ribbon.
