= Coinjection =

Polymer injection technology

Co-injection is a polymer injection technology in which different polymers are injected into the same mold. This specialized process can be used to improve part performance and cost while minimizing cycle time and production volume. Co-injection can be used to extend shelf life, improve production efficiencies, and allow for greater design flexibility depending on the materials used and the application.

Reasons for using co-injection are:

1. reducing cost by using a cheaper fill material as the non-visible core of a product
2. combining desired properties of polymers, such as colour (the differently colored parts in car tail lights), feel (soft-touch toothbrush) or mechanical properties.
3. alter the density and elasticity of the final project making it either float in water or shock absorbent.

Despite these advantages, co-injection requires machinery that is more expensive and difficult to maintain than standard single injection machines. The coinjection process also has difficulty with complex geometric shapes.
