= KFIZ (AM) =

- Fond du Lac, Wisconsin; United States
- Frequency: 1450 kHz
- Branding: News-Talk 1450 & 100.7

Programming
- Format: News/talk
- Affiliations: Compass Media Networks; Fox News Radio; Premiere Networks; Westwood One; Fond du Lac Dock Spiders; Milwaukee Brewers Radio Network; Milwaukee Bucks Radio Network; Packers Radio Network

Ownership
- Owner: Mountain Dog Media; (RBH Enterprises, Inc.)
- Sister stations: WCLB; WFON

History
- First air date: May 1922

Technical information
- Licensing authority: FCC
- Facility ID: 36419
- Class: C
- Power: 1,000 watts unlimited
- Transmitter coordinates: 43°47′28″N 88°28′16″W
- Translator: 100.7 W264DN (Fond du Lac)

Links
- Public license information: Public file; LMS
- Webcast: Listen live
- Website: www.kfiz.com

KFIZ (1450 kHz, "News-Talk 1450 & 100.7") is a commercial radio station licensed to Fond du Lac, Wisconsin. The station is owned by Randy Hopper's Mountain Dog Media and the license is held by RBH Enterprises, Inc. KFIZ airs a news/talk radio format. The station's studios and offices are on the southeast corner of Main and Cotton Streets in downtown Fond du Lac. KFIZ is among Wisconsin's oldest commercial radio stations, beginning experimental broadcasts in 1922.

KFIZ is powered at 1,000 watts, using a non-directional antenna, its transmitter is on West Scott Street in Fond du Lac. Programming is also heard on 250-watt FM translator W264DN at 100.7 MHz in Fond du Lac.

== Programming ==
The station begins weekdays with local talk, farming and information shows. KFIZ is a member of the Wisconsin Radio Network for regional news and sports programming.

Weekends feature programs on technology, travel and gardening, along with a polka music show. Weekends also include sydnicated programs.

Sports programming on KFIZ includes local high school football, high school basketball, college football and college basketball, plus Major League Baseball as part of the Milwaukee Brewers Radio Network. KFIZ also airs NBA basketball as part of the Milwaukee Bucks Radio Network. It carries a sports betting show from the Vegas Stats & Information Network (VSiN) on Saturday evenings.

KFIZ used CNN Radio for its national news coverage in the 1990s. Around 2007, it switched its affiliation to Fox News Radio. Its on-air staff includes Pam Jahnke (Wisconsin Farm Report), Shawn Kiser and Nick Van Nocker (KFIZ Today), and Jerry Schneider (The Jerry Schnieder Polka Show).

== History ==
=== Experimental broadcasts ===
According to Federal Communications Commission (FCC) records, KFIZ's first license was granted in July 1923. However, the station has traditionally traced its origin to earlier broadcasts by what was described as "an experimental station" beginning in May 1922. It was operated by Fond du Lac businessman Oscar A. Huelsman, who owned a Dodge automobile dealership at 22 Forest Avenue.

The station's studio was located on the third floor of the Haber Printing Company building at 18 Forest Avenue, next to Huelsman's auto showroom and garage. Edward "Cap" Conley was responsible for the technical side of the operation. On July 6, 1923, a license for a new broadcasting station operating on 1100 kHz in Fond du Lac was issued jointly to the Daily Commonwealth newspaper and Oscar A. Huelsman.

=== Unusual call letters ===
The station was randomly issued the call letters KFIZ from an alphabetical roster of available call signs. However, this was a rare exception to the standard practice of only stations west of the Mississippi River receiving call letters starting with "K", as stations east of this boundary normally received call letters starting with "W". No reason was given for this exception.

Ownership changed the next year to the Daily Commonwealth and Seifert Radio Corp., and the year after that was changed to the Daily Commonwealth and Wisconsin Radio Sales (Inc.), located at 22 Forest Avenue. In 1926 this was modified to just the Fond du Lac Commonwealth Reporter. On June 15, 1927, KFIZ was assigned to 1120 .

Following the establishment of the Federal Radio Commission (FRC), stations were initially issued a series of temporary authorizations starting on May 3, 1927. In addition, they were informed that if they wanted to continue operating, they needed to file a formal license application by January 15, 1928, as the first step in determining whether they met the new "public interest, convenience, or necessity" standard. On May 25, 1928, the FRC issued General Order 32, which notified 164 stations, including KFIZ, that "From an examination of your application for future license it does not find that public interest, convenience, or necessity would be served by granting it." The FRC reported that KFIZ was deleted as of August 1, 1928, due to failure to participate in a review hearing. However, the station eventually convinced the commission that it should remain licensed, and on November 11, 1928, under the provisions of the Federal Radio Commission's General Order 40, the station moved to 1420 kHz, still at 100 watts.

=== Changes in ownership ===
Ownership was changed in 1929 to the Reporter Printing Company, and in 1931 the station moved to studios on the second floor of the Reporter Building at 18 West First Street. In March 1941, with the implementation of the North American Regional Broadcasting Agreement (NARBA), KFIZ moved to its current frequency of 1450 kHz. In the mid-1940s the station increased transmitter power to 250 watts.

The KFIZ Broadcasting Company acquired the station in May 1946 and owned the station through the early 1960s. Through the 1930s, 1940s and 1950s, KFIZ was a network affiliate of the Mutual Broadcasting System (MBS). It carried Mutual's dramas, comedies, news and sports shows. By the 1950s, as network programming shifted from radio to television, KFIZ began a middle of the road format of popular adult music, news, sports and talk.

=== KFIZ-TV ===
In 1968, KFIZ put a sister station on UHF television. KFIZ-TV broadcast on Channel 34 as an independent television station. It covered an 11-county area in east-central Wisconsin. KFIZ-TV often simulcast popular shows from television stations in Milwaukee as well as educational children's shows from WHA-TV in Madison. But not having a network affiliation and covering a mostly rural area hurt advertising sales.

When the parent company decided to sell the newspaper and KFIZ radio, there were no parties interested in taking on the money-losing television operation. KFIZ-TV was taken off the air in 1972.

=== Wisconsin Cablevision ===
In November 1986, Wisconsin Cablevision & Radio Co., Inc. completed a merger by transferring the license for this station to Donald G. Jones and Wisconsin Cablevision Inc., a partnership doing business as the Wisconsin Cablevision Partnership. The deal was approved by the FCC on December 19, 1986, and the transaction was completed on December 28, 1986. In September 1987, the Cablevision Partnership made a deal to sell KFIZ to the Independence Broadcasting Wisconsin Corp. The deal was approved by the FCC on November 3, 1987, and the transaction was consummated on January 20, 1988. In the 1980s, as music listening shifted to FM radio, KFIZ reduced its music programs and increased spoken-word shows. It completed the transition to all talk by the 1990s.

In June 1993, Independence Broadcasting Wisconsin Corp. contracted to sell this station to Lakeside Cablevision Limited Partnership (doing business as Star Cablevision, a forerunner business to Charter Communications's Wisconsin operations). The deal was approved by the FCC on August 24, 1993, and the transaction was consummated on September 30, 1993.

=== Randy Hopper ===
In January 1997, Lakeside Broadcasting Wisconsin Limited Partnership reached an agreement to sell KFIZ to current owner RBH Enterprises, Inc., which does business as Mountain Dog Media. It is operated by former State Senator Randy Hopper. The deal was approved by the FCC on January 23, 1997, and the transaction was consummated on the same day.

The station launched its FM translator station W264DN 100.7 MHz in late October 2021. The license was granted during the AM revitalization window.

In 2022, Mountain Dog Media moved from its larger Winnebago Drive facility to a smaller facility in downtown. The older facility was outmoded and had a surplus of unused space originally built for the needs of KFIZ-TV. It was re-used by Star Cablevision/Marcus Cable/Charter Communications before the city's public access needs were reduced and Charter moved near the Interstate 41 frontage road as Fond du Lac became a major headend and call center for its Wisconsin operations.
