= Lifest =

Christian music festival

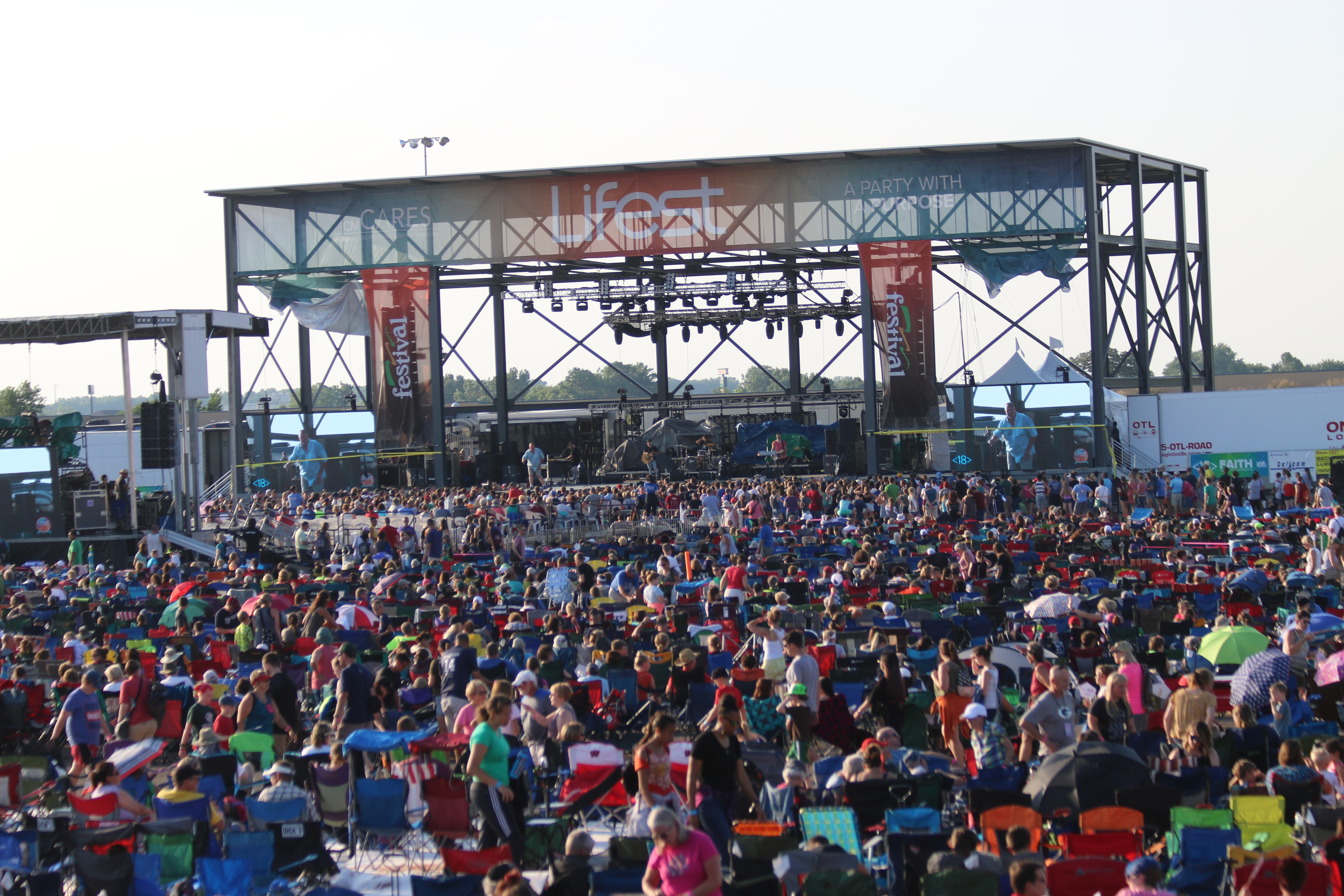
- Crowd at Lifest 2018
- Genre: Christian music
- Dates: second weekend of July
- Locations: Sunnyview Expo Center; Oshkosh, Wisconsin
- Years active: 1999–2019, 2021–
- Founders: Bob Lenz
- Website: lifest.com

Lifest is an annual Christian music festival that takes place in Oshkosh, Wisconsin, at the Sunnyview Expo Center. Lifest has the slogan "A Party with a Purpose." It is one of the largest Christian music festivals in America.

== History ==
Lifest started as a walk/run in 1990. Lifest became a music festival in 1999 and was attended by 7000. It became five days long for the first time in 2006. Starting in 2013, it was shortened to four days. It is held on or around the second weekend of July. In 2013, Lifest had an average of 20,000 attendees per day. The event had 23,000 attendees in 2017. As of 2018, Lifest featured around 150 artists on seven stages. The festival is a member of the Christian Festival Association.

The Winnebago County fairgrounds board approved allowing Lifest to build a $750,000 permanent main stage. The stage was built on the former site of the fairground's grandstand and stock car racing track. It was unveiled for the 2018 event.

The COVID-19 pandemic caused officials to scrap Lifest in 2020. It returned in 2021.

== Performers and speakers ==
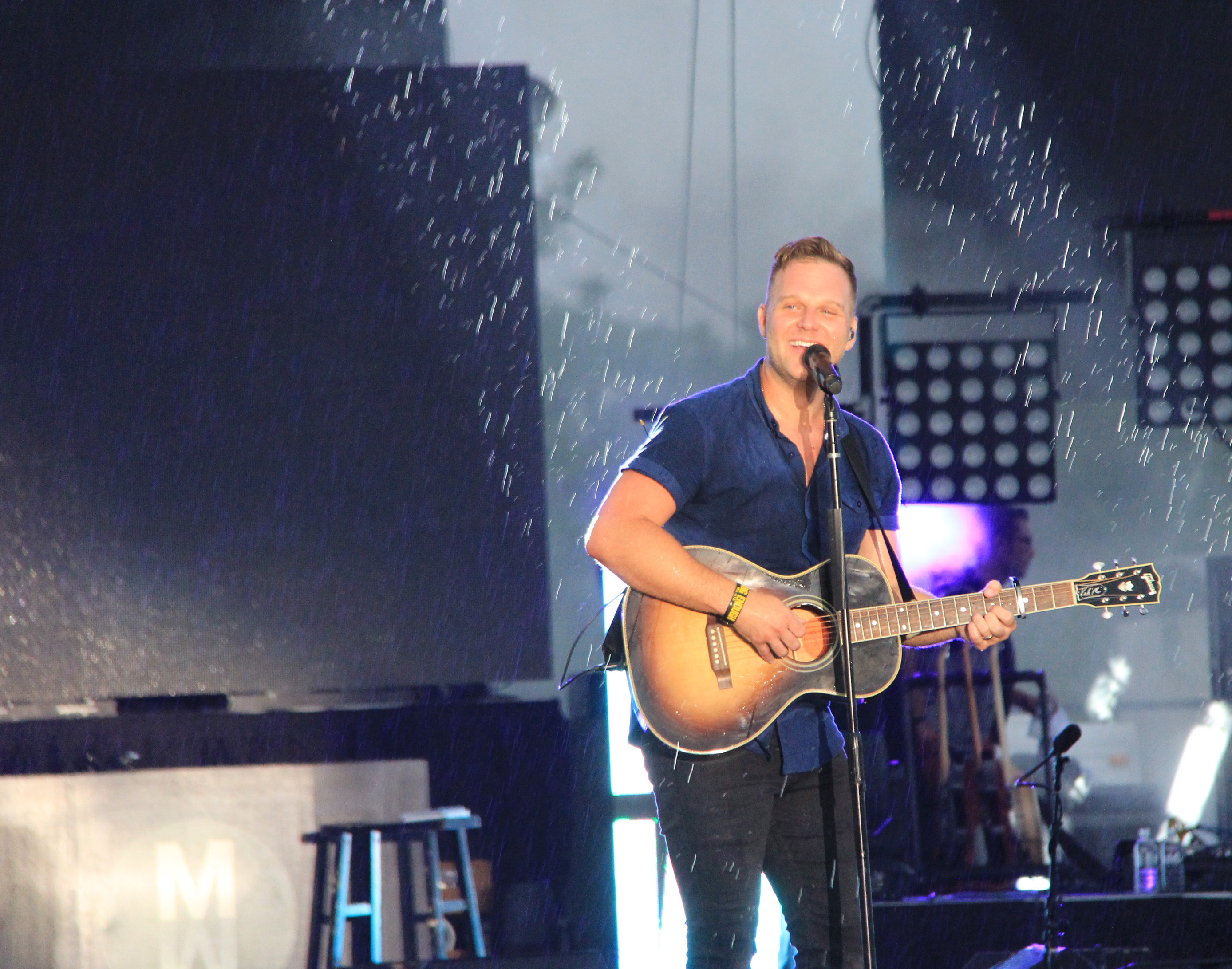
Matthew West playing in the rain at Lifest 2014

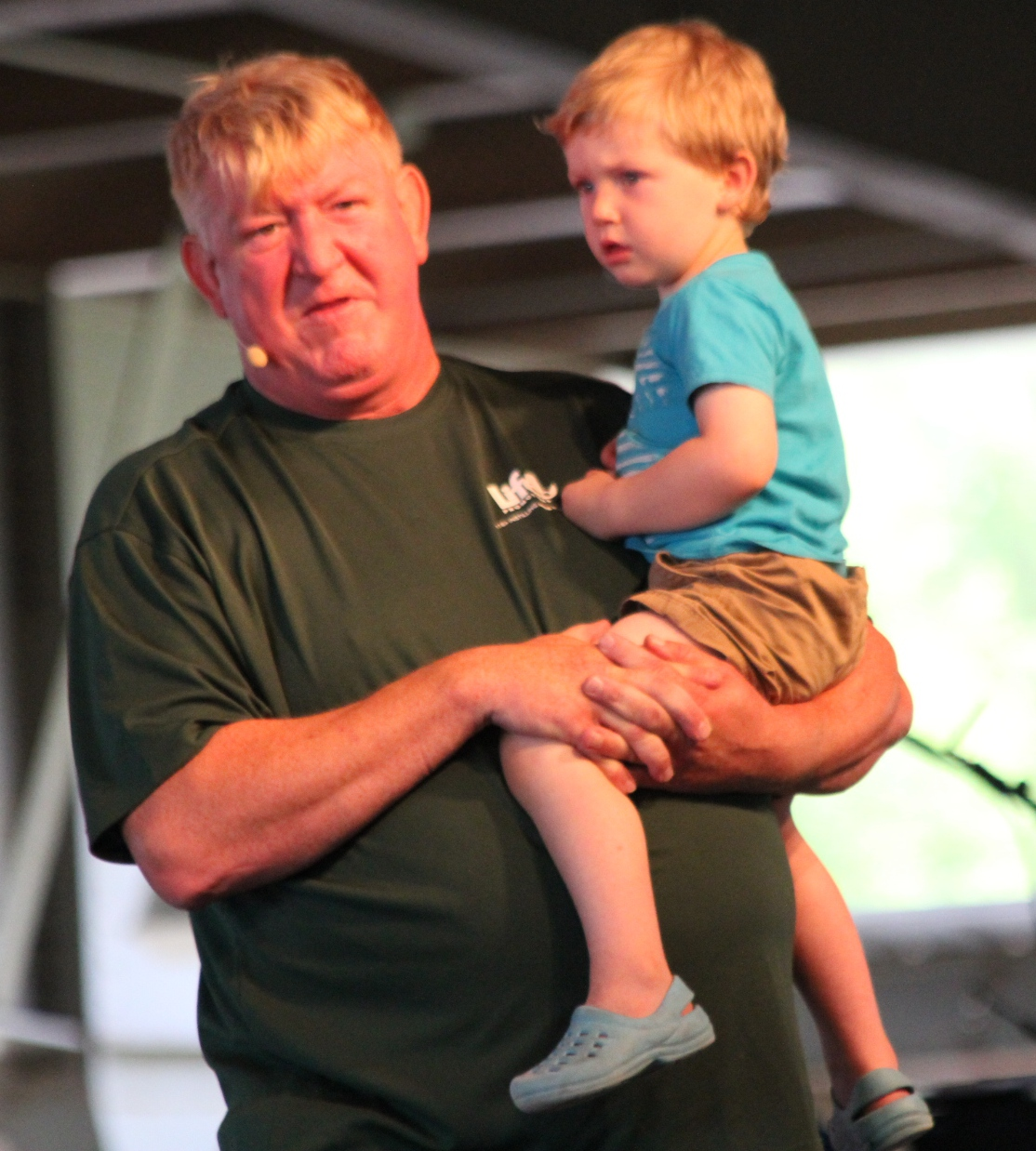
Bob Lenz closing 2014 Lifest

Musically, Lifest has featured a wide range of groups such as Toby Mac, Casting Crowns, Skillet, Newsboys, Steven Curtis Chapman, For King & Country, Matthew West, Family Force 5, Kutless, Downhere, Tenth Avenue North, Fireflight, FM Static, Sanctus Real, Building 429, Thousand Foot Krutch, 4th Point, Superchick, Matt Redman, The Letter Black, Needtobreathe, Matt Maher and Jimmy Needham. Superchick had their first concert at Lifest; they held at 2016 reunion concert at the venue.

Lifest also has speakers and seminars as an integral part of the festival. Speakers have included founder Bob Lenz, Luis Palau, John Ortberg, Tony Campolo, Scott Spencer, Ken Davis, and many more.

Lifest has approximately 3000 primitive and electric campsites available. Activities include dodgeball, 5K Fun Run, volleyball, inflatable games, prayer journey and KidZone. Lifest is run by Life Promotions and requires over 1000 volunteers.
