= Sheboygan Falls, Wisconsin =

- City
- Downtown Sheboygan Falls

- Location of Sheboygan Falls in Sheboygan County, Wisconsin.

- Location within Wisconsin Location within the United States
- Coordinates: 43°44′N 87°49′W
- Former Name: Town of Rochester
- Country: United States
- State: Wisconsin
- Counties: Sheboygan
- Settled: 1835
- Incorporated: 1913

Government
  - Type: Mayor-Council
  - Mayor: Randy Meyer

Area
  - Total: 5.53 sq mi (14.33 km^{2})
  - Land: 5.39 sq mi (13.97 km^{2})
  - Water: 0.14 sq mi (0.36 km^{2})
- Elevation: 660 ft (200 m)

Population (2020)
  - Total: 8,210
  - Density: 1,520/sq mi (588/km^{2})
- Time zone: UTC-6 (Central)
  - Summer (DST): UTC-5 (Central)
- ZIP Code: 53085
- Area code: 920
- FIPS code: 55-73025
- Website: cityofsheboyganfalls.com

Sheboygan Falls is a city in Sheboygan County, Wisconsin, United States, along the Sheboygan River. The population was 8,210 at the 2020 census. It is part of the Sheboygan metropolitan area.

== History ==
Sheboygan Falls took its name from the nearby falls on the Sheboygan River. The city was called Rochester for a brief time; the name was changed because a community in Racine County already held the same name.

== Geography ==
Sheboygan Falls is located along the Sheboygan River between its confluences with the Mullet and Onion Rivers near Lake Michigan. Rapids and a dam, which once supplied hydroelectric energy, prohibit most water transportation through the city.

According to the United States Census Bureau, the city has a total area of 5.41 square miles (14.01 km^{2}), of which, 5.28 square miles (13.68 km^{2}) is land and 0.13 square miles (0.34 km^{2}) is water.

== Demographics ==
Historical population
Census	Pop.	Note	%±
1870	1,174		—
1880	1,148		−2.2%
1890	1,118		−2.6%
1900	1,301		16.4%
1910	1,630		25.3%
1920	2,002		22.8%
1930	2,934		46.6%
1940	3,395		15.7%
1950	3,599		6.0%
1960	4,061		12.8%
1970	4,771		17.5%
1980	5,253		10.1%
1990	5,823		10.9%
2000	6,772		16.3%
2010	7,775		14.8%
2020	8,210		5.6%
U.S. Decennial Census

=== 2010 census ===
As of the census of 2010, there were 7,775 people, 3,480 households, and 2,152 families residing in the city. The population density was 1,472.5 inhabitants per square mile (568.5/km^{2}). There were 3,681 housing units at an average density of 697.2 units per square mile (269.2 units/km^{2}). The racial makeup of the city was 96.1% White, 0.6% African American, 0.3% Native American, 0.9% Asian, 0.8% from other races, and 1.4% from two or more races. Hispanic or Latino of any race were 2.5% of the population.

There were 3,480 households, of which 27.2% had children under the age of 18 living with them, 50.2% were married couples living together, 8.6% had a female householder with no husband present, 3.1% had a male householder with no wife present, and 38.2% were non-families. 33.0% of all households were made up of individuals, and 14.9% had someone living alone who was 65 years of age or older. The average household size was 2.22 and the average family size was 2.82.

The median age in the city was 42.6 years. 22.3% of residents were under the age of 18; 6% were between the ages of 18 and 24; 25.1% were from 25 to 44; 28.9% were from 45 to 64; and 17.7% were 65 years of age or older. The gender makeup of the city was 48.0% male and 52.0% female.

=== 2000 census ===
As of the census of 2000, there were 6,772 people, 2,745 households, and 1,869 families residing in the city. The population density was 1,658.3 people per square mile (640.3 people/km^{2}). There were 2,826 housing units at an average density of 692.0 units per square mile (267.2 units/km^{2}). The racial makeup of the city was 98.05% White, 0.34% Black or African American, 0.31% Native American, 0.30% Asian, 0.30% from other races, and 0.71% from two or more races. 0.86% of the population were Hispanic or Latino of any race.

There were 2,745 households, out of which 31.7% had children under the age of 18 living with them, 58.4% were married couples living together, 7.1% had a female householder with no husband present, and 31.9% were non-families. 26.7% of all households were made up of individuals, and 9.5% had someone living alone who was 65 years of age or older. The average household size was 2.39 and the average family size was 2.91.

In the city, the population was spread out, with 23.9% under the age of 18, 7.4% from 18 to 24, 30.1% from 25 to 44, 22.7% from 45 to 64, and 15.9% who were 65 years of age or older. The median age was 39 years. For every 100 females, there were 91.9 males. For every 100 females age 18 and over, there were 91.1 males.

The median income for a household in the city was $47,205, and the median income for a family was $55,668. Males had a median income of $40,006 versus $25,293 for females. The per capita income for the city was $22,456. About 2.6% of families and 2.7% of the population were below the poverty line, including 3.3% of those under age 18 and 4.6% of those age 65 or over.

== Economy ==
Major employers in Sheboygan Falls include:

- Bemis Manufacturing Company is the world's largest toilet seat manufacturer and a leading manufacturer of engineered plastics. Its headquarters is in Sheboygan Falls and it is the county's second largest employer.
- Richardson Industries is the longest running, privately held company in Wisconsin. Headquartered in Sheboygan Falls, they produce many wood products such as roof trusses, kitchen and bath products and yacht interiors.
- Curt G. Joa is an innovative manufacturer of paper converting product machinery.
- PolyVinyl Co. is headquartered in Sheboygan Falls. The company manufactures custom extrusions and color guard railing systems.
- Rockline Industries, headquartered in nearby Sheboygan, WI, has a distribution and co-packaging operation in Sheboygan Falls. Rockline Industries is a leading manufacturer in coffee filters and wet wipes.
- Johnsonville Sausage is a few miles to the north of Sheboygan Falls and is the largest producer of sausage in the United States.

There are two business parks in Sheboygan Falls: Sheboygan Falls Industrial Park, which is privately owned and fully developed, is located about one mile from State Highway 23. Vision Business Park has 70 city-owned acres available for development. The park is located less than one mile from State Highway 23, at the southwest corner of County Road C and County Road TT.

== Parks and recreation ==
- Ducktona 500 - 3,000 plastic ducks race down the Sheboygan River for cash prizes every July. The event also includes and antique car show, at River Park.
- Sheboygan Falls YMCA, located in downtown Sheboygan Falls has a full fitness center and day care.
- The Bull at Pinehurst Farms is a Jack Nicklaus signature golf course and one of the top 100 public golf courses in the United States.
- Rochester Park is a 10-acre community park with baseball diamond, soccer field, tennis/pickleball courts, grills shelter, playground equipment, sledding hills and dog park.
- River Park is a 10-acre park along the Sheboygan River near downtown Sheboygan Falls. Ducktona 500 is held every July here and there are 2 shelters used for community events.
- Settler's Park is a small park just north of downtown Sheboygan Falls, along the Sheboygan River. This park has hosted many weddings and offers a great view of the dam on the river.
- Camp Y-Koda is a YMCA youth and teambuilding camp just north of the community.
- Old Plank Road Trail is a 17-mile recreational trail from Sheboygan, passing north of Sheboygan Falls to Glenbeulah, WI. This trail doubles as a snowmobile trail in winter.

Sheboygan County, the only county in Wisconsin designated a “Bicycle Friendly Community” by the League of American Bicyclists, has built nearly 39 miles of off street bike trails and dozens of miles on on-street trails. The 17 mile Old Plank Road Trail runs from Sheboygan through Sheboygan Falls to Glenbeulah, WI. This trail doubles as a snowmobile trail in Winter.

== Government ==
Sheboygan Falls has six elected alderman from three districts elected for staggered two-year terms.

== Education ==
=== Public schools ===
The community is served by the public system of the School District of Sheboygan Falls, which accomplished a 99.3% high school graduation rate, one of the highest in the nation. The system has three schools consisting of an elementary school, (grades 4k-4), middle school (grades 5–8) and high school (grades 9–12) serving approximately 1,700 students. The district has received awards for its use in social media and newsletters to communicate with parents. The district does have summer school offerings for students who want to learn year round.

With 500 students, the middle schools offer several tracks for those who learn at different paces. The school has programs in the arts, including drama and music clubs.

=== Private schools ===
Families preferring private school education attend schools in Sheboygan, including Sheboygan Christian School and Sheboygan Lutheran High School; the city's Catholic school, St. Mary, closed in 2013 due to declining enrollment.

== Media ==
Sheboygan Falls is served by Spectrum and AT&T U-verse for wired pay-TV service locally. WHBZ (106.5 FM) is licensed to Sheboygan Falls, though for all intents and purposes that mainstream rock station serves and originates from Sheboygan. Sheboygan-licensed station WCLB (950/107.3) has their transmitter towers located on the city's north side.

== Infrastructure ==
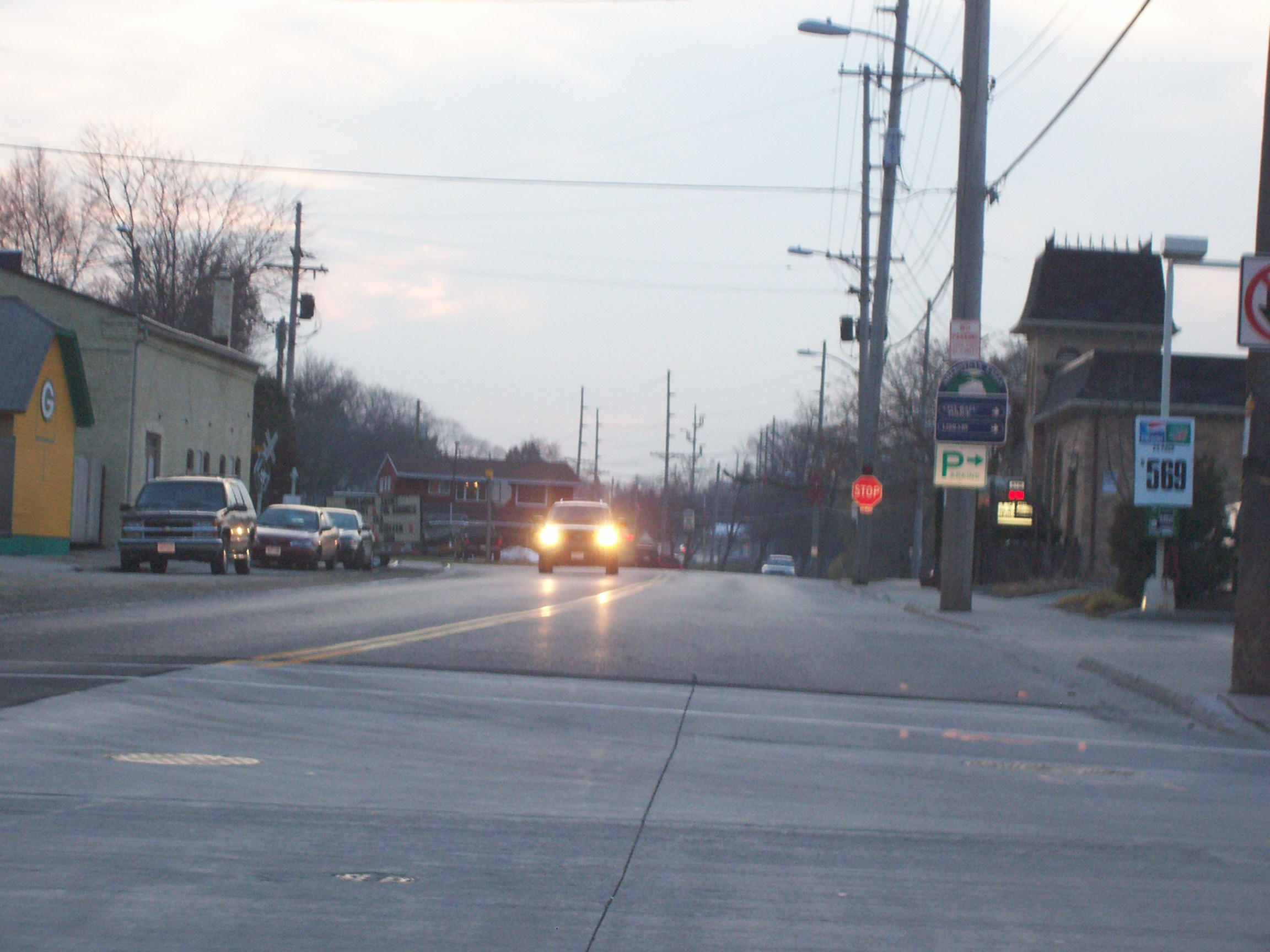
The intersection of County Highway PP and WIS-32

=== Transportation ===
The City of Sheboygan Falls is located along State Highways 23, 28, and 32. The free-way style four-lane Highway 23 connects the community with Interstate 43 located less than five miles east of Sheboygan Falls.

A single-track railroad branch line between Plymouth and Sheboygan runs through the city. Built by the Chicago & North Western (C&NW) Railroad, the track originally paralleled the electric interurban Wisconsin Power & Light line which terminated at Elkhart Lake. In later years it was primarily a freight line for the Chicago and North Western Transportation Company, and Union Pacific after UP acquired the C&NW in 1995. In 2006, citing low demand and degraded infrastructure, Union Pacific announced plans to abandon the line west of the Kohler Company factory in Kohler, thus terminating all service to Sheboygan Falls. In 2009, the Wisconsin Department of Transportation purchased the Plymouth-Sheboygan Falls portion of the line from Union Pacific, with the intent of repairing the long dormant line to allow the Wisconsin & Southern Railroad to provide restored service to Sheboygan Falls.

The track through downtown Sheboygan Falls has been of interest to railfans because of a number of interesting features, including an iron trestle over the Sheboygan River, a small section of street running where the line runs at grade along city streets, and antiquated "wig-wag" signals at several crossings. Many of these features have been threatened because of the Union Pacific's abandonment of the line; the trestle has been barricaded and parts of the tracks leading to it have been removed, and plans to restore the line for the resumption of service will require crossing signals to be upgraded. Wig wag signals have already been removed.

Sheboygan Falls is served by the Sheboygan County Memorial Airport (KSBM), which is located several miles north of the city. KSBM is the 7th busiest airport in Wisconsin with no commercial travel. The 700+ daily flight operations are primarily travel for business and pleasure, with its heaviest use from the Kohler Company, along with events at Road America and Whistling Straits. KSBM is capable of landing a 98,000 lbs. aircraft or a Boeing 737 with the longest concrete runway 6,800 feet long. The airport has fixed base operator with several private, industrial and commercial lots available for development. Milwaukee Mitchell International Airport (KMKE) is 64 mi away from Sheboygan Falls.

=== Emergency services ===
Sheboygan Falls was named one of the safest communities in Wisconsin by Safewise. The Sheboygan Falls Police Department maintains a full-time police presence in the city, with an administrative staff of four, 11 sworn officers and Emma, the community's K-9 unit. The city has a volunteer fire department. Orange Cross Ambulance Station 3 is quartered with the volunteer fire department at the Municipal Building.

=== Utilities ===
The city of Sheboygan Falls provides locally based water and sewerage services (both connected to Sheboygan's water/sewerage system and drawing water from Lake Michigan), along with electric service through Sheboygan Falls Utilities. Natural gas service is provided through Wisconsin Public Service Corporation.

== Notable people ==
- Herman E. Boldt, Wisconsin State Senator
- George H. Brickner, U.S. Representative
- Jedediah Brown, Wisconsin State Representative
- Emery Crosby, Wisconsin State Representative
- Marsena E. Cutts, politician
- Brian Donlevy, Irish-born actor
- George S. Graves, Wisconsin State Representative
- David Giddings, businessman, engineer, territorial legislator
- Martin O. Galaway, Wisconsin State Representative
- Harold F. Huibregtse, Wisconsin State Senator
- Rick Majerus, college basketball coach
- Louis H. Prange, Wisconsin State Senator
- Hiram N. Smith, Wisconsin State Representative
- George W. Spratt, Wisconsin State Representative
- John E. Thomas, Wisconsin State Senator
- Alfred Verhulst, U.S. Air Force general
- Charles H. Weisse, U.S. Representative
- Weldon Wyckoff, MLB player

== See also ==
- List of cities in Wisconsin
