= WISN-TV =

Television station in Milwaukee

- Milwaukee, Wisconsin; United States
- Channels: Digital: 28 (UHF); Virtual: 12
- Branding: WISN 12

Programming
- Affiliations: 12.1: ABC; for others, see § Subchannels

Ownership
- Owner: Hearst Television; (WISN Hearst Television Inc.)

History
- First air date: October 27, 1954
- Former call signs: WTVW (1954–1955)
- Former channel numbers: Analog: 12 (VHF, 1954–2009); Digital: 34 (UHF, 2003–2019)
- Former affiliations: ABC (1954–1961); DuMont (secondary, 1954–1955); CBS (1961–1977)
- Call sign meaning: The Wisconsin News (former Hearst-owned Milwaukee newspaper later merged by The Milwaukee Sentinel)

Technical information
- Licensing authority: FCC
- Facility ID: 65680
- ERP: 1,000 kW
- HAAT: 304.7 m (1,000 ft)
- Transmitter coordinates: 43°6′42″N 87°55′42″W

Links
- Public license information: Public file; LMS
- Website: www.wisn.com

WISN-TV (channel 12) is a television station in Milwaukee, Wisconsin, United States, affiliated with ABC and owned by Hearst Television. The station's studios are located on the west end of the Marquette University campus, and its transmitter is located at Lincoln Park in the northeastern part of Milwaukee.

== History ==
=== First tenure with ABC ===
The station first signed on the air on October 27, 1954, as WTVW (for its on-air slogan "Wisconsin's Television Window"). In early 1955, the station was purchased by the Hearst Corporation, publishers of The Milwaukee Sentinel and owners of WISN radio (1130 AM); the new owners changed channel 12's call letters to WISN-TV, after its radio sister (whose calls were derived from now-defunct newspaper The Wisconsin News. The station originally operated as a primary ABC affiliate with a secondary DuMont affiliation. WISN-TV lost the DuMont affiliation when that network ceased operations in 1956, leaving it exclusively with ABC.

In January 1958, WISN-TV became the flagship station of the Badger Television Network, a three-station network serving Wisconsin that also included WFRV-TV in Green Bay and WKOW-TV in Madison. Programs broadcast by the network included Homemaker's Holiday, a quiz show; Good Housekeeping, titled after the Hearst magazine of the same name; and Pretzel Party, a variety program originally. All three programs originated from WISN-TV's studios. During March 1958, the network also aired U.S. Senate Investigation Committee hearings during late-night hours. The network ceased operations on August 8, 1958. WISN-TV and WISN radio gained an FM radio sister when Hearst signed on WISN-FM (97.3, now WRNW) in 1961.

=== Switch to CBS ===
In 1961, CBS affiliated with WISN-TV, as its sister radio station had been a longtime affiliate of the CBS Radio Network. As a result, Storer Broadcasting-owned WITI-TV (channel 6) and WISN swapped networks: channel 12 switched its affiliation to CBS and channel 6 became an ABC affiliate on April 2, 1961.

During channel 12's time with CBS, it was the home station for the NFL's Green Bay Packers for the Milwaukee market, airing the team's first two Super Bowl appearances.

WISN-TV's main logo since the switch to ABC in 1976, used solely for news imaging from 2006 to 2012. It returned as the main logo on all programming on September 17, 2012. The ABC circle logo is added to the station-generated bug for syndicated programming.

WISN's 'contemporary 12' logo, used from 2006 as the station ID at the start of its newscasts, entertainment programming, and as the logo bug used during ABC network programs. Slowly fading from use after the station's September 2012 re-imaging.

=== Second tenure with ABC ===
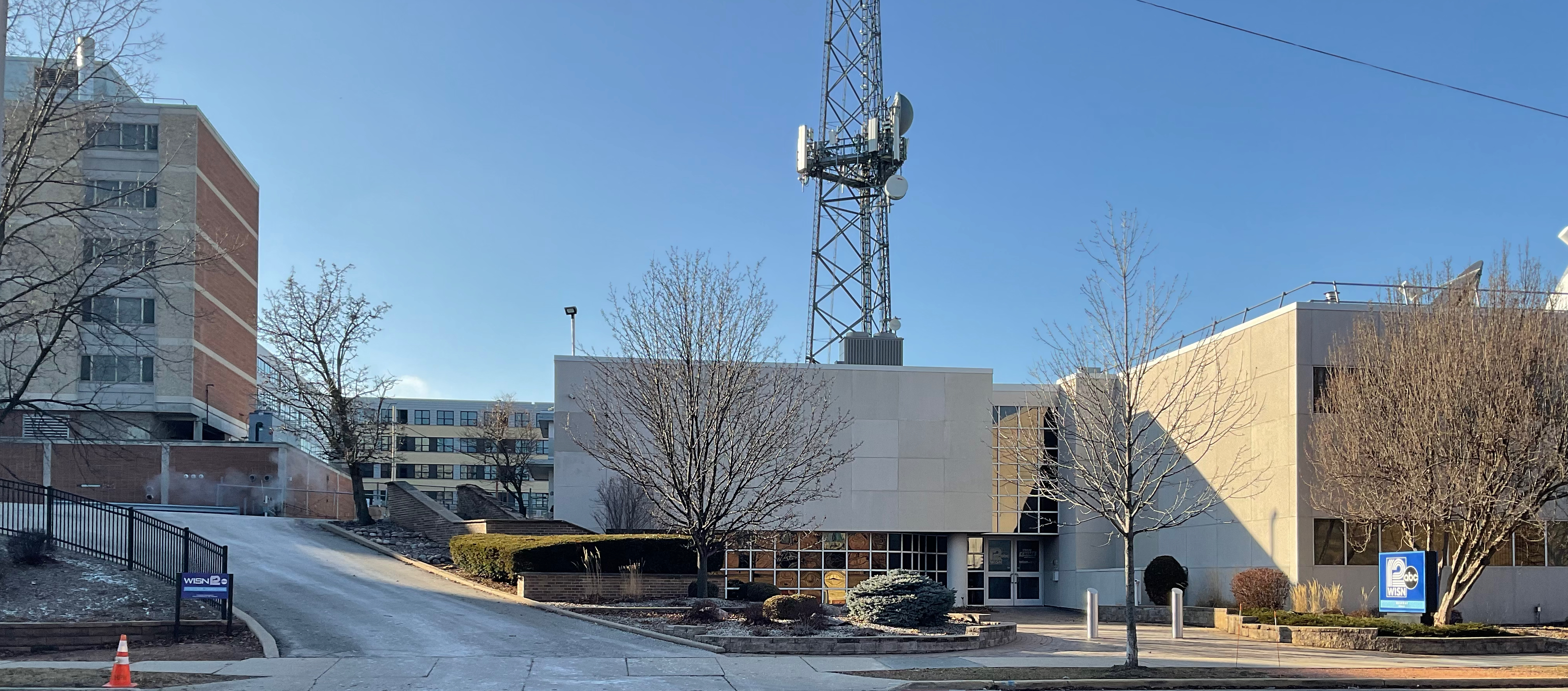
WISN-TV's studio facility near the campus of Marquette University.

On September 26, 1976, CBS announced it was moving its Milwaukee affiliation back to WITI-TV. Storer Broadcasting had much better relations with CBS than it reportedly had with ABC; weeks earlier, ABC opted to drop Storer's San Diego station KCST-TV from the network after a four-year dispute stemming from KCST's successful battle to strip that market's ABC affiliation from XETV-TV in nearby Tijuana, Mexico. Meanwhile, ABC had become the top-rated television network in the United States, thanks in large part to two Milwaukee-set sitcoms: Happy Days and Laverne & Shirley. WISN-TV and ABC agreed to a new affiliation contract about a month later; the two stations swapped networks once again on March 27, 1977; the final CBS program to air on channel 12 was an episode of The Carol Burnett Show with guest Ken Berry, which aired at 9 p.m. Central Time on the night before the station rejoined ABC (the station also aired the United Cerebral Palsy Telethon ahead of its return to ABC at 6 p.m. that Sunday evening). WISN even used Happy Days star Henry Winkler (in character as Arthur "Fonzie" Fonzarelli) to herald its return to ABC with the slogan "Happy Days are Here Again" in on-air and print campaigns leading up to the switch. To this day, WISN-TV has been one of ABC's most successful affiliates, and bills itself as such in its own promotions.

Around the same time, the station was the first which utilized newscast composer Frank Gari's "Hello News" package, which included an imaging song individualized to each market's city; in this case "Hello Milwaukee", which remains well-remembered and remains used in various ways by WISN-TV to the present day, and was cited as one of the factors in driving viewers to the station in the late 1970s and allowing it to be competitive.

For most of its years with ABC, the station did not include the network's logo next to theirs, branding solely with the channel number and/or call letters vocally and visually (outside of network-created radio promos which referred to the station as "12 ABC") until 2012, when the network began to contractually require the ABC logo be included with any affiliate's logo redesign. In November 2014, the station unveiled their current logo with the call letters beneath the long-used "12" logo form and the ABC logo on the right side of the "12" number mark, the first with the ABC logo blended in for all uses, including for news and entertainment programming, and ending a long run where the station's call letters were rendered in Bank Gothic font. Vocally, the station remains "WISN 12". The station is among the few in the nation which has their logo in a transparent bug at all times, including ABC network and news programming, though not during commercial breaks or paid programming.

Channel 12 was the first commercial station in the market to produce a high-definition broadcast, airing the Summerfest "Big Bang" fireworks show in HD on June 29, 2006. Milwaukee Public Television assisted WISN-TV in the production of the broadcast, and have continued to do so each year since, with additional help from sister stations in Sacramento and Boston in later years.

Hearst sold WISN radio and what by then became WLTQ to Clear Channel Communications in 1997, and the third floor WLTQ/WISN radio studios were vacated in 2000 after their move to the expanded WOKY facility in Greenfield. During the transition, WLTQ's live on-air personnel, who also acted as hosts for WISN's local programming and Wisconsin Lottery drawings and its game show, The Money Game (allowing the news department to avoid any on-air role with the lottery outside relaying winning numbers), became employees of Clear Channel, and after The Money Game ended production in the mid-2000s, the station virtually ceased local productions not connected to newscasts, advertising, or charity efforts. All ties between WISN-TV and its former sister radio stations were severed when a longtime agreement with channel 12 to provide forecasts for WISN (AM) and the then-WQBW (now WRNW) and four others within Clear Channel's Milwaukee radio cluster ended on July 27, 2009 (though WRNW continues to transmit from WISN-TV's tower), as WITI began its own weather/news content agreement with the stations. WISN-TV then began a news content agreement with Saga Communications for its five area radio stations (WKLH, WHQG, WJMR-FM, WJYI and WNRG-FM), along with providing weather forecasts to WGXI in Plymouth. Due to the now separate ownership of the two stations, WISN-TV's news staff disclaim both on-air and through their social networking channels that the station has no connections with WISN radio's conservative talk format other than sharing the same call letters, a point of contention and confusion during events such as live shots at the Wisconsin State Capitol for the 2011 state budget debate.

In February 2014, the station added an SAP audio channel, allowing the station to carry ABC programming featuring audio description or a Spanish-language dub, and complying with the FCC's requirements to offer audio description.

On April 30, 2021, the station added a third subchannel carrying Shop LC over-the-air as part of a broader year-long channel carriage agreement between that network's owners and Hearst (ShopLC already purchases several channel slots on pay television providers, thus Hearst does not need to seek cable carriage for that subchannel). A fourth subchannel carrying programming from theGrio launched at the end of September of the same year, though it is mapped to 12.5 rather than 12.4. 12.4 was activated for Weigel's Story Television at the end of March 2022, and 12.3 went dark upon the end of Shop LC's carriage deal with Hearst.

=== Summer 2012 Time Warner Cable carriage dispute ===
As Hearst and Time Warner Cable entered into a retransmission consent dispute that resulted in Hearst's stations being removed from TWC's systems in certain markets on July 10, 2012, WISN was not immediately removed from its Milwaukee area systems in an eleventh hour announcement, as the direct fiber connection between WISN and TWC was then the same line utilized to Charter Communications; before the two companies merged in 2017 as Spectrum, Charter served the outer portions of the market such as western Waukesha County and most of Washington, Fond du Lac and Sheboygan counties. Under a side agreement between the providers, TWC was bound to keep the fiber connection on the air, along with Hearst for Charter. It was the only Hearst station to remain on TWC during the dispute, but with both Start Over video on demand and the ability to record station programming to TWC DVRs completely removed. Charter then tried to pursue a different method of transmitting WISN's signal to remove itself as an intermediary from the dispute, and was able to make the arrangements by July 12, allowing WISN's removal from Time Warner Cable one day later, with WISN's SD and HD channel slots replaced with Hallmark Movie Channel. The dispute was resolved on July 19, returning the station to TWC's systems that evening.

== Programming ==
=== Sports programming ===
WISN airs any Milwaukee Bucks games that are selected to be broadcast on the NBA on ABC; this included the team's victory in the 2021 NBA Finals, the team's and the city's first championship in 50 years. The station also carries Monday Night Football games featuring the Green Bay Packers by virtue of Hearst's 20% ownership of ESPN.

=== News operation ===
WISN-TV presently broadcasts 39 hours of locally produced newscasts each week (with six hours each weekday and 4 1/2 hours each on Saturdays and Sundays); WISN is one of the few Hearst-owned stations that carries an hour-long midday newscast. The station utilizes two weather radars as part of its "Doppler 12 Radar Network", using radar sites based at the National Weather Service forecast office in Sullivan, and atop Froedtert's Community Memorial Hospital in Menomonee Falls, which is operated by the station. It is the only Milwaukee station to have a helicopter for newsgathering.

Longtime anchor Jerry Taff retired on May 26, 2005, as WISN's newscasts began to climb in the ratings. Its success stems from hiring popular local anchors and reporters released from other stations, a stronger ABC schedule, and a period of change at rival WTMJ-TV due to NBC's weaker ratings and changes in its newsroom staff. The station's biggest hire came when longtime WTMJ anchor Mike Gousha joined channel 12 in 2007, a year after he retired as WTMJ's evening news anchor in order to focus on his new position as a distinguished fellow in law and public policy at Marquette University. Gousha served as a political analyst for WISN, and hosted the Sunday morning program UpFront with Mike Gousha, which is a mix of the interview segments familiar to viewers of his former WTMJ program Sunday Night, and local political analysis. Hearst syndicated the show to other stations statewide, and in August 2010 all of the stations involved (along with Milwaukee Public Television, which provided technical assistance with HD production) broadcast a Gousha-moderated forum for the Wisconsin Republican gubernatorial candidates called the UpFront Town Hall Challenge from Marquette's new law building, which was purposefully structured to avoid classification as a traditional debate where either candidate could use the format to "sell" themselves. The format was repeated in October 2010 between the Democratic and Republican nominees for governor and U.S. Senate.

WISN has gradually expanded its newscast schedule since 2007, beginning to program hour-long newscasts, starting that year with a Sunday at 10 p.m. broadcast and for a time, an hour-long Saturday 6 p.m. newscast (the 6:30 p.m. half-hour currently features either paid programming, Project Pitch It [a local version of ABC's Shark Tank, which is syndicated to stations throughout Wisconsin] or 12 Sports Saturday). On July 30, 2010, WISN, like most of its ABC-affiliated sister stations under Hearst did on that date, added a one-hour extension of its weekend morning newscast from 8 to 9 a.m. On September 6, 2010, WISN expanded its weekday morning newscast a half-hour early to 4:30 a.m., extending the program to 2 1/2 hours.

On April 21, 2009, the station began using full-time pillarboxing with the station logo and callsign on the respective sides of the screen for newscasts and other standard-definition programming. Afterwards, the station began to slowly implement 16:9 graphical elements; in March 2010, WISN-TV unveiled 16:9-optimized weather alert graphics to allow programs to continue to be shown in HD rather than force a downscale to a modified 4:3 mode in which the program was displayed in 3:3 (to much viewer complaint over the years, especially with ABC prime time programming), with the weather warnings taking up the remainder of the screen. News tickers and logo bugs were also later upgraded; the only HD news segments until late June 2011 aired on its newscasts the day of the Summerfest "Big Bang" fireworks show, usually scenic and human interest pieces, along with Milwaukee Public Television co-productions. On October 10, 2010, the station began broadcasting its newscasts in 16:9 widescreen standard definition, with the pillarboxes being removed. Then on June 28, 2011, WISN-TV became the third station in Milwaukee (behind WTMJ-TV and WITI) to begin broadcasting its newscasts in high definition. Footage shot in-studio is broadcast in HD, while all news video from on-remote locations was initially upconverted to widescreen standard definition for broadcast. Since 2012, the station has upgraded its mobile units and field cameras to HD as equipment has needed replacement. In May 2013, the station unveiled its first HD skycam, overlooking the downtown Cathedral Square Park.

On January 24, 2011, WISN-TV expanded its 10 p.m. newscast to one hour (becoming the third Hearst-owned station with an hour-long late local newscast, along with Albuquerque's KOAT and Honolulu's KITV). This bumped Access Hollywood from its longtime 10:30 p.m. slot to 12:30 a.m., resulting in NBCUniversal Television Distribution asking for an opt-out from the program's syndication contract with WISN to move Access, ending up on WTMJ at 6:30 p.m. on April 11, 2011 (Access aired at 1:37 a.m. from January 2013 until September 2014 due to WTMJ's January 2013 relaunch of its 6:30 p.m. newscast as the newsmagazine Wisconsin Tonight; it now airs on WITI in overnights at 4 a.m.).

On September 10, 2018, the station added an hour-long 11 a.m. local newscast leading into GMA Day (now GMA3: What You Need To Know), which coincided with the station introducing a next-generation news set, replacing one utilized since October 2001 with multiple re-facings and equipment replacements in the interim. On January 14, 2019, the station reduced its 10 p.m. newscast to the standard 35 minutes due to Hearst's newest ABC affiliation agreement, allowing WISN-TV to carry the ABC late night lineup "live" and in pattern for the first time in the station's history. The station began to air a nightly half-hour 9 p.m. newscast on WISN-DT2 on April 1, 2019, entitled WISN 12 News at 9, joining WITI and WMLW-TV (via WDJT) in carrying news at that time. It joined with many of its fellow Hearst stations in programming a prime time newscast on their .2 subchannels, which are usually associated with MeTV. On days where TCN has an hour-long program in the news timeslots, alternate programming like Upfront and Matter of Fact with Soledad O'Brien is re-aired in the latter half to fill the entire hour. The 9 p.m. newscast ended on December 27, 2024, with resources re-allocated to updates through the station's social media presences during prime time programming. WISN-DT2 also carries the Saturday 6 p.m. newscast during the college football season, along with the premiere of that week's Big 12 Sports Saturday.

On June 6, 2022, the station launched a 4 p.m. hour-long newscast with the end of The Ellen DeGeneres Show on weekdays (which shifted back to 3 p.m. to complete its run through the summer), thus being the last station in the market to do so.

==== Notable former on-air staff ====
- John Coleman – weather anchor
- Dan Lewis – anchor (1982–1985)
- Joel Kleefisch – reporter (1994–2003)
- Rebecca Kleefisch – anchor (1999–2004)
- DeMarco Morgan – anchor/reporter (2004–2007)
- Shaun Robinson – anchor
- Jerry Taff – anchor (1979–2005)
- Ben Tracy – anchor
- Paul Weyrich – political reporter and weekend anchor

== Technical information ==
=== Subchannels ===
The station's signal is multiplexed:

Subchannels of WISN-TV
Subchannel	Res.	Short name	Programming
12.1	1080i	WISN TV	ABC
12.2	480i	CRIME	True Crime Network
12.4	480i	STORY	Story Television
12.6	480i	GET TV	Great

=== Analog-to-digital conversion ===
WISN-TV ended regular programming on its analog signal, over VHF channel 12, at 8:30 a.m. on June 12, 2009. The transition was led by a retrospective on the station's history narrated by former longtime anchor Jerry Taff, followed by a still of digital transition information that remained until noon, when its analog transmitter was permanently shut down. The station's digital signal continued to broadcast on its pre-transition UHF channel 34, using virtual channel 12. The channel 12 frequency was subsequently used as the post-transition digital signal of WBBM-TV in Chicago.

On May 17, 2010, WISN-TV filed an application to upgrade its digital transmitter's power to 1 megawatt, mainly to place the station's digital antenna at the taller height of the dormant analog antenna, which would be replaced by a new digital unit. The analog antenna was removed in September 2010, and the digital antenna was activated from the new placement in early October 2010.
