= Bob Reitman =

American radio personality

Robert "Bob" Reitman (born December 1941 ) is an FM radio personality (disc jockey, or deejay) from Milwaukee, Wisconsin, USA. Reitman was a pioneer in freeform radio, also known as "underground radio", and has been playing album-oriented rock music and providing on-air commentary for over 45 years at various radio stations in the Milwaukee market. Until retiring 2024 he hosted a show once a week on WUWM, the Milwaukee Public Radio station where he got his start. His primary inspiration is Bob Dylan.

== Early days ==
Reitman, son of an FBI agent, was born in Enid, Oklahoma and raised in the Milwaukee area village of Whitefish Bay. He received an English degree from Marquette University and a graduate degree in Urban Education from the University of Wisconsin–Milwaukee (UWM). His early interests included poetry, and it was while he was performing poetry to music in coffee shops that he was asked to take over a poetry show on WUWM (89.7 FM, "Milwaukee Public Radio") the National Public Radio station in Milwaukee, Wisconsin owned and operated by UWM. He was soon doing his own music show "It's Alright Ma, It's Only Music", one of the first "underground" FM music shows in the freeform style, where the disc jockey has full creative control and essentially makes up the programming as he goes along. The style was known for the hushed tones of the radio announcer in contrast to the blaring, shouting style of many AM radio personalities of the time, as well as the playing of long, extended album cuts (often from the deejay's personal collection), creative song sequencing across genres, and a general counterculture atmosphere that focused on the music rather than the announcer. The title of the show was taken from the Bob Dylan song It's Alright, Ma (I'm Only Bleeding) and Dylan's music would continue to be the dominant theme of Reitman's career. In 1967, he was also one of the founders of Milwaukee's first underground newspaper, Kaleidoscope.

== Commercial radio ==
In the late 1960s Reitman moved to FM radio station WZMF, a small 3000 watt station in Menomonee Falls, WI, where he performed his first full-time radio show in the freeform style that allowed deejays to be their own program directors. His show was called "The Eleventh House", which is also the name of an LP he released in 1972 of spoken word poetry and music. Some listeners went to great lengths to pick up the weak signal, and the station's slogan was along the lines of "WZMF ... We're Hard To Get, But It's Worth It". Over the years he hosted shows at numerous other commercial radio stations in the Milwaukee area including: WAWA, WTOS, WQFM and WKTI, although as the years went on he had to relinquish the freeform style and mostly conform to the stricter programming formats enforced by commercially owned stations. In 1976 while at WQFM, Reitman set the Guinness Book of World Records for continuous broadcasting by staying on the air at Wisconsin State Fair Park for 222 hours and 22 minutes. In 1980 he teamed up with Gene Mueller, and the pair co-hosted the morning show at WKTI for over twenty-five years. They broadcast from the Soviet Union as well as from six Olympic games. They were known as well for their large scale pranks, such as advertising they would be dropping the very hot Christmas toy ‘Cabbage Patch dolls’ from the sky over the parking lot of the Milwaukee Brewers County Stadium.

== Retirement ==
In 2006 Reitman retired from co-hosting the morning show at WKTI. He hosted a new version of his old WUWM radio show, "It's Alright Ma, It's Only Music" with his son, Robert "Bobby" Reitman III once a week until his retirement on April 19, 2024. He has another son, John, and a daughter, Jessica.
