= WJMR (disambiguation) =

WJMR-FM is a radio station (98.3 FM) licensed to Menomonee Falls, Wisconsin.

WJMR may also refer to:

- WGSO, a radio station (990 AM) licensed to New Orleans, Louisiana, which held the call sign WJMR from 1946 to 1964, and again from 1969 to 1972
- WVUE-DT, a television station (Channel 8 virtual/29 digital) licensed to New Orleans, Louisiana, which held the call sign WJMR-TV from 1953 to 1959
- WMAN-FM, a radio station (98.3 FM) licensed to Fredericktown, Ohio, which held the call sign WJMR from 1986 to 1992
- WSFQ, a radio station (96.3 FM) licensed to Peshtigo, Wisconsin, which held the call sign WJMR from 1992 to 1996
- WRXS, a radio station (106.9 FM) licensed to Brookfield, Wisconsin, which held the call sign WJMR from 1999 to 2000
- WQEZ, a radio station (1370 AM) licensed to Fort Campbell, Kentucky, which held the call sign WJMR from 2001 to 2003
