= FadeAway Basketball Magazine =

FadeAway Magazine is a quarterly magazine which is published in the United Kingdom that covers basketball. The publication was launched in June 2009.

== History ==
FadeAway was founded by Jake Green and Mike Baptiste, with Greg Tanner as editor and Harry Adams as art director. The magazine was renamed as MVP in 2010. The first issue appeared on 4 October 2010. The magazine is published by Response London on a quarterly basis.
