= American Dance Traxx =

American Dance Traxx was an American dance music countdown program that was syndicated by Westwood One and produced at KPWR/Los Angeles, California from March 1987 to December 1993. The three-hour program was distributed to more than 200 Top 40/CHR and Rhythmic stations internationally, including The Armed Forces Network.

The program was hosted by Jeff Wyatt, then a program director of KPWR and co-produced with Joel Salkowitz from sister station WQHT/New York City. Wyatt and Salkowitz came up with the concept of putting together a program, using a similar format that was used by other Westwood One-produced programs, which featured the 25 most popular Dance songs in the United States based on radio airplay and requests. Although Westwood One had a partnership with (and later acquiring) "Radio & Records" when it came to using their charts, this was the only program that never used the R&R chart, as there was no Dance chart in the magazine at the time. The show also used music bumpers and imaging elements were similar to the ones used at KPWR and WQHT.

In addition to the airing the most popular songs, it also featured the five newest songs that were future picks, as well as the most requested slow-jams by its listeners. Wyatt also made surprise phone calls to listeners (who also mentioned the station that they were listening the show on, like WLUM/Milwaukee) and at times gave away a prize even after they played their requested song. In-between the songs, artist interviews (taped or live) were also featured. The program also featured themed countdown shows that were devoted to house, Disco, Hip-Hop and 80s Dance music, as well as annual countdowns.

In October 1991, Wyatt stepped down as host after he resigned from the PD position at KPWR to join rival Los Angeles Top 40/CHR KIIS-FM and was temporarily succeeded by Deborah Rath (from WQHT) until March 1992, when former MTV VJ and Club MTV host Downtown Julie Brown became the permanent host, and continued in this capacity until its final broadcast in December 1993 (a year end countdown edition), when Westwood One discontinued domestic production of the program. However, the syndicated radio network continued to produce "American Dance Traxx" for international stations.
