= WFMR =

WFMR may refer to:

- WFMR (FM), a radio station (91.3 FM) licensed to serve Orleans, Massachusetts, United States
- WFMR (defunct), in Milwaukee, Wisconsin, United States
