= Drew Olson (sportswriter) =

American sportscaster

- Born: 1966 (age 59–60); Menomonee Falls, Wisconsin, U.S.
- Occupations: Sportscaster, sportswriter
- Website: Onmilwaukee.com

Drew Olson is an American sportscaster from Menomonee Falls, Wisconsin. He attended the University of Wisconsin–Milwaukee in Milwaukee, Wisconsin.

Olson was host of WAUK 540 ESPN's "The D-List," which aired weekdays from 10AM-1PM and featured Dan Needles, the longtime Sports Director at WISN-TV. Needles and Olson also co-host "Big 12 Sports Saturday with 540 ESPN," a weekly TV show that airs on Milwaukee's ABC-TV affiliate at 6:30 p.m. Saturday during football season. In 2016, Olson joined WOKY/The Big 1070 WTSO, where he hosts The Drew Olson Show and is a contributor on the Mike Heller Show.

In addition to his broadcast work, Olson served as senior editor/columnist for the radio station's website, ESPNWisconsin.com. Olson was also a frequent contributor on the Bob and Brian morning show on WHQG The Hog to discuss Milwaukee Brewers baseball. He also works occasionally as a sideline reporter for Fox Sports Wisconsin during Milwaukee Brewers broadcasts.

== Early life ==
Olson grew up in Menomonee Falls, Wisconsin and graduated from Menomonee Falls High School in 1984. Olson won five varsity letters in basketball and track at Menomonee Falls. Olson then attended the University of Wisconsin–Milwaukee and earned a B.S. degree in journalism in 1988. Olson played basketball for the University of Wisconsin–Milwaukee men's basketball team for one semester and often jokes about how desperate the program was at the time. Pulled out of the intramural ranks to be the 10th man on a 10-man squad, Olson was rewarded with varsity letter for his efforts even though he barely played for the Panthers and did not score a basket. "I was easily the most important guy on the team," he joked, "without me they wouldn't have had enough guys to scrimmage."

== Time at the Milwaukee Journal Sentinel ==
Olson began working at the Milwaukee Journal Sentinel in college and spent 19 1/2 years at the paper, almost all of it in the sports department. Olson had numerous beats at the paper before being named the Milwaukee Brewers beat writer, which he held for 11 years. Olson was named the president of the Baseball Writers' Association of America in 2004, after serving as vice president the previous year. He served as an official scorer for the 2002 All-Star Game in Milwaukee and the 2004 contest in Houston. As a 10-year member of the BBWAA, Olson maintained his Hall of Fame vote when he left the paper and was reinstated as an active member in the BBWAA prior to the 2012 season.

== OnMilwaukee.com ==
Olson joined OnMilwaukee.com on May 1, 2006, to be the senior editor and sportswriter for the online magazine. Olson also had done freelance work for The Sporting News, Baseball America, Sports Illustrated and numerous other publications but it was his first full-time job at an outlet other than The Milwaukee Journal and Milwaukee Journal Sentinel. He left OnMilwaukee.com in Sept. 2010 to join Good Karma Broadcasting full-time.

== Time at WAUK ==
After appearing on multiple radio outlets as a Brewers/baseball expert, Olson teamed with Needles on a Saturday morning show in the summer of 2004 and kicked off "The D-List" on Jan. 3, 2005. When the show began, Needles' participation was limited by WISN-TV management and Olson worked with a variety of co-hosts including local broadcasters like Bob Brainerd, Daron Sutton and others. Olson is considered the leader of the show, often moderating the segments and arguing with Needles, whom he first met in the late 1980s. Olson and Needles began "Big 12 Sports Saturday with 540 ESPN" on Aug. 20, 2011. The show, which airs before ABC's primetime college football broadcast, is a breezy 30-minute affair that analyzes the next day's Green Bay Packers game and features a "Stump Rainman" trivia segment, debate and coverage of other sports.

Olson also serves as a fill-in host for WAUK broadcasts such as "Extra Innings," a Brewers postgame show and Marquette University basketball pre- and post-game shows. is known for turning any subject or any sport into Major League Baseball or the Milwaukee Brewers. Also has an extensive knowledge of music and describes himself as "one of the worst guitarist in garage-band history." His college bands included "Proof of Purchase," and "The Lonely Guys."
