= WLVE =

Radio station in Milwaukee

- Milwaukee, Wisconsin; United States
- Broadcast area: Southeastern Wisconsin
- Frequency: 93.3 MHz (HD Radio)

Programming
- Format: Contemporary Christian
- Network: K-Love

Ownership
- Owner: Educational Media Foundation; (K-LOVE, Inc)
- Sister stations: WLDB, WLUM

History
- First air date: June 1958
- Former call signs: WQFM (1958–1996); WJZI (1996–2007); WLDB (2007–2026)
- Call sign meaning: “K-Love”

Technical information
- Licensing authority: FCC
- Facility ID: 59974
- Class: B
- ERP: 16,000 watts
- HAAT: 270 meters (890 ft)
- Transmitter coordinates: 43.096°N 87.904°W
- Translator: 96.9 W245AK (Sheboygan)

Links
- Public license information: Public file; LMS
- Webcast: Listen live
- Website: www.klove.com

WLVE (93.3 FM) is a non-commercial radio station in Milwaukee, Wisconsin. Currently owned and operated by the Educational Media Foundation and broadcasts the company's nation-wide Contemporary Christian music K-Love network.

WLVE has an effective radiated power (ERP) of 16,000 watts. The station's transmitter site is in Milwaukee's North Side off Humboldt Boulevard near Estabrook Park and the Milwaukee River.

== History ==
=== Early years (1958–1973) ===
WQFM signed on the air in 1958 under the ownership of Hugo Koeth Jr. The station had various programs and formats in its early years, including classical music, big band music, jazz and ethnic programming, After Koeth's death in 1972, the station was sold to Shamrock Broadcasting who first tried an automated Top 40 format.

=== Rock (1973–1996) ===
Starting in 1973, WQFM was Milwaukee's dominant album oriented rock station. The station competed with the eclectic free-form WZMF until 1979, and WLPX until 1983.

"93QFM" was the top rock station in town for over a decade, but faced its stiffest competition in 1987, when WBCS ended its country music format and became active rock WLZR, "Lazer 103". Seeing WLZR take away some listeners, WQFM shifted to a more heavy metal/hard rock direction, similar to that of "Lazer".

In 1992, WQFM switched to a more "adult rock" format, then became heavier again. In addition, the station had a succession of morning shows over the years, including an ill-fated attempt at airing Wisconsin native Jonathon Brandmeier's show from WLUP in Chicago. That backfired when WLUP shuffled its on-air lineup, moving Brandmeier to afternoons and put Kevin Matthews in morning drive time. At one point, WQFM put together one short-lived morning show that consisted of people who had never done radio, which included Lori Minetti, the hostess of the Wisconsin Lottery's Money Game television show and later, the host of WITI's Builder's Showcase.

=== Smooth jazz (1996–2007) ===
After years of falling ratings, on March 1, 1996, at 10:15 am, WQFM ended its rock format with "Long Live Rock" by The Who, and flipped to smooth jazz under new WJZI call letters. The first song under the new format was "I Wish" by Najee. The WQFM call letters were then transferred to a sister station in Scranton, Pennsylvania, WTZR, to prevent re-use by a Milwaukee competitor.

WJZI's smooth jazz format never dominated among Milwaukee radio listeners, but remained competitive in the middle portion of the Arbitron ratings. In the winter of 2005, the station tied for 9th place with WJMR among listeners 25 to 54, but rose to 7th place in the winter of 2006.

On March 5, 2007, WJZI began a transition in its format, gearing the station towards a slightly younger female demographic. This involved adding more adult contemporary music. De-emphasizing the smooth jazz instrumental music that was a staple of the station, WJZI changed its branding to "Smooth 93.3", as it slowly began to make the transition to full-fledged soft rock.

By June 18, 2007, the transition was complete, with revamped on-air imaging, station logo and website. In addition, the station rebranded as "The All New Smooth 93.3". A new morning show was also added, featuring Milwaukee radio veteran Ellen Stout and station program director Stan Atkinson. Competing station WFMR changed its format from classical music to smooth jazz on June 26, one week after WJZI's move. That station changed its call sign to WJZX.

=== Adult contemporary (2007–2025) ===
On July 30, 2007, WJZI adopted new positioning, changing its call letters to WLDB, with the new moniker "B93.3". This matched the imaging used by a popular station with the same format in Philadelphia, WBEB. The station uses the decimal number to avert confusion with Sheboygan's country-formatted WBFM, which likewise brands as "B93.7" and has fringe reception in the central reaches of Ozaukee County. The station's weather forecasts are prepared and delivered by WDJT-TV's weather staff.

In June 2009, WLDB tweaked its format from soft AC to mainstream AC, playing music from the 1980s, 1990s, and the 2000s. This type of format was on WKTI before it flipped to an adult hits format and changed its call sign to WLWK-FM in November 2008. WLDB was attempting to compete with hot AC station WMYX-FM, although "The Mix" plays more new music than old. As of 2011, the station played music from the 1970s through the present. The station's schedule all weekend between 5 pm on Fridays and 5 am on Mondays, consisted solely of 80s music.

The station rebranded as "Trending Radio 93.3" at 6:07 pm on April 1, 2015, after playing You Gotta Be by Des'ree, a title playing as a pun for a skit which followed where the station's former bee mascot was swatted to cue the branding change. The first song on "Trending Radio" was Let's Get It Started by The Black Eyed Peas. The playlist was then tightened towards more current and recent hits, focusing on competing more with WMYX, along with WXSS and WRNW to a lesser extent.

On February 23, 2016, at 3 pm, after playing "Royals" by Lorde, WLDB returned to its former adult contemporary format and "B93.3" branding, though lacking the "bee" elements and mascot. The first song after the relaunch was "Don't Stop Believin'" by Journey.

==== Christmas music ====
In previous years, the station usually has only had intermittent Christmas music in the period between Thanksgiving and mid-December, then all Christmas for a couple of weeks leading to the holiday, but since 2016, has raced WRIT-FM in converting in mid-November. In 2016, the station went all-Christmas on November 17, beating WRIT-FM for the first time.

=== K-Love (2025–present) ===
On August 25, 2025, the station announced it was being purchased (along with sister station WLUM) by K-Love Inc., and would change formats to Christian music.

On August 29, at noon, after a live goodbye show from the departing airstaff that ended with "End Of The Road" by Boyz II Men, WLDB dropped its adult contemporary format. In homage to the station's history as a Christmas station, and in response to some listener requests, WLDB opted to flip to an all-Christmas format early (stating it was doing so because it would not be there to do so come November and December) until K-Love closes on the purchase. However, the stunt only lasted a week; on September 4, the station reverted to adult contemporary, and went completely automated and jockless while the sales process was completed.

On October 13, WRNW, owned by rival company iHeartMedia, assumed the adult contemporary format and "B" branding. Though both stations would run separate from each other during WLDB's remaining time with the format, WRNW launched with an emphasis on welcoming displaced WLDB listeners to try the new version; by October 29, this had even extended to 93.3's social media accounts, which would explicitly promote the change as a transfer of the format, before effectively transforming into the official accounts for 97.3's version of the format following the move.

At 11:50 am on October 30, in the middle of "Love Somebody" by Maroon 5, the station's automation system was wound down and the station was temporarily taken dark as EMF took operational control, with K-Love launching on 93.3 FM at noon, ten minutes later.

On February 5, 2026, WLVE and WLDB swapped call signs.

== HD Radio ==
WLVE broadcasts in the HD Radio hybrid format, currently without any subchannels. The HD2 digital subchannel carried former sister station WZTI's oldies format.

On October 27, 2024, WLDB (now WLVE) activated an HD3 sub-channel; on the same date, WLDB-HD3 began stunting with Halloween music, branded as "The Haunt". WLDB-HD3 also fed FM translators W262CJ 100.3 MHz, broadcasting from the same site as WLDB's transmitter, and W297BY 107.3 MHz. On November 7, at noon, WLDB-HD3 launched a country music format, branded as "Froggy 100.3/107.3".

On September 16, 2025, the HD2 and HD3 signals and formats were discontinued.

== Translator ==
WLVE is relayed to a translator in Sheboygan that was formerly licensed to repeat WPFF until April 2026, although WLVE's main signal is already city-grade within most of Sheboygan County. The transmitter site is owned by the county and broadcasts within Taylor Park, and is shared with a translator on 94.9 of Milwaukee competitor WVCY-FM (107.7). The translator was established by Sturgeon Bay's WNLI in 2005, then began to relay WPFF in 2014 after WNLI's sale to another party.

Call sign	Frequency	City of license	FID	ERP (W)	Class	FCC info
W245AK	96.9 FM	Sheboygan, Wisconsin	139381	38	D	LMS
