= WMYX-FM =

Hot adult contemporary radio station in Milwaukee

- Milwaukee, Wisconsin; United States
- Broadcast area: Milwaukee metropolitan area
- Frequency: 99.1 MHz (HD Radio)
- Branding: 99-1 The Mix

Programming
- Language: English
- Format: Hot adult contemporary
- Subchannels: HD2: MeTV FM (soft oldies); HD3: Regional Mexican ("Caliente 97.9")
- Affiliations: Westwood One

Ownership
- Owner: Audacy, Inc.; (Audacy License, LLC)
- Sister stations: WSSP; WXSS

History
- First air date: November 1, 1962
- Former call signs: WEMP-FM (1962–70); WNUW (1970–81)
- Call sign meaning: "Mix"

Technical information
- Licensing authority: FCC
- Facility ID: 27029
- Class: B
- ERP: 50,000 watts
- HAAT: 137 meters (449 ft)
- Transmitter coordinates: 42.946°N 88.061°W
- Translator: HD3: 97.9 W250BN (Milwaukee)

Links
- Public license information: Public file; LMS
- Webcast: Listen live (via Audacy); Listen Live (HD3)
- Website: www.audacy.com/991themix

WMYX-FM (99.1 MHz) is a commercial radio station in Milwaukee, Wisconsin, US. Calling itself "99-1 The Mix", it was the first station in the U.S. to use the "Mix" moniker. WMYX-FM has been airing roughly the same hot adult contemporary radio format since late 1981. The station is owned by Audacy, Inc., along with sister stations WXSS-FM and WSSP. WMYX's studios and transmitter (sharing one of WSSP's towers) are co-located in Hales Corners. The playlist consists of current hits and recent hits from the 2000s and 2010s. WMYX is responsible for the activation of the Milwaukee metropolitan area Emergency Alert System.

WMYX-FM broadcasts in the HD Radio format, with its HD-2 sub-channel carrying a soft oldies format known as "MeTV FM". The HD-3 sub-channel airs a regional Mexican format branded as "Caliente 97.9", which is relayed on translator 97.9 W250BN.

== History ==
=== WEMP-FM (1962–1981) ===
On November 1, 1962, the station signed on as WEMP-FM, owned by the Milwaukee Broadcasting Company. At first, the station simulcast co-owned AM sister station WEMP, but by the late 1960s, WEMP-FM was airing its own programming for about half of its broadcast day. In 1970, the station flipped to its own full-time format: "WNUW Stereo FM", first with Drake's Chenault's automated Hitparade and then to their Solid Gold oldies format. Then it tried an Adult Top 40 format, followed by album-oriented rock known as "X-Rock 99".

Later, it switched to easy listening music. On October 31, 1978, the station flipped to "Disco 99" and played all-disco music. WNUW was the first disco station in Milwaukee, pre-dating WLUM's launch into the format four months later in February 1979. WNUW's run as a disco outlet lasted less than 10 months. Afterward, it became known as "Music FM 99" again, this time with a disco-leaning Top 40 hits format.

=== Adult contemporary (1981–1998) ===
In 1981, the station switched to AC with the call sign WMYX using the moniker "99 WMYX The Mix". During the 1980s and the 1990s, WMYX's playlist featured a mixture of Hot AC, Soft AC and dance/pop songs.

During the 1996 and 1997 NFL seasons when the Green Bay Packers went to the Super Bowl, the station gained fame when morning hosts Dan Weber and Jane Matenaer recorded parody songs with Packer and football themes. The most famous was the "Packarena" (parody of Los Del Rio's "Macarena"). The song was played heavily on the station during the 1996 season. For the 1997 season, Dan & Jane recorded a parody of "Wannabe" by the Spice Girls under the name "Packer Wannabe". Cassette tapes were sold of the songs at various southeast Wisconsin locations with proceeds going to the Child Abuse Prevention Fund.

=== Hot adult contemporary (1998–present) ===
When sister station WAMG switched to Top 40 and became WXSS in June 1998, WMYX evolved into a standard Hot AC format with a more focused playlist. In September 2004, longtime morning co-host Dan Weber was replaced with WXSS morning hosts Michael Knight and Rahny Taylor in an airstaff shakeup. Jane Matenaer remained on board with Knight and Taylor. At the same time, longtime afternoon host Mark Richards was replaced by crosstown WKTI-FM evening host Kidd O'Shea. Taylor returned to WXSS soon after. Knight was let go due to differences with management, and Kidd O'Shea was promoted from Afternoon drive time to Mornings.

The "Jane & Kidd In The Morning Show" won the 2006 AIR Award for favorite Milwaukee morning radio show. On May 15, 2009, longtime co-host Jane Matenaer was released from WMYX. Soon after, Elizabeth Kay, who had sometimes filled in for Matenaer when she was gone, joined Kidd O'Shea for the morning show. The show was known as "Kidd and Elizabeth in the Morning". Later, Tony "Radar" Hess was hired to replace Kidd O'Shea, with the show renamed "Elizabeth and Radar".

== Christmas music ==
From 2003-2011, "The Mix" aired Christmas music from November through Christmas Day every year. WRIT-FM began competing with WMYX on a yearly basis starting in 2005, when it switched to a Christmas format during the holiday season. In 2007, the holiday format started unusually early, as WMYX began its Christmas music programming on November 1. The move paid off, with WMYX becoming the highest rated music station in Milwaukee during that two-month time period.

In 2008, WMYX went All-Christmas on October 31 (Halloween) at 3:21 p.m. after crosstown Christmas rival WRIT started playing Christmas music at 3:13 p.m. In 2009, WMYX began Christmas programming at roughly 7:00 p.m. on November 13. WRIT made the switch about 20 minutes later. In 2010, WMYX lost its title as the leading Milwaukee-area Christmas station when rival WRIT switched at approximately 5:15 p.m. on November 18. WMYX waited to air the all-Christmas music format until 12:00 a.m. on November 22. In 2011, WMYX switched around 5:00 p.m. on November 10. WRIT followed shortly after at 5:55 p.m.

WMYX decided not to air the Christmas music format in 2012 for the first time in a decade. This resulted in a backlash on the station's Facebook page from angry listeners who considered WMYX's "Christmas Mix" a holiday tradition. Instead, WMYX provided a streaming channel of Christmas music on its web site and integrated a few Christmas songs into the station's regular playlist. Meanwhile, WRIT often referred to itself as "Milwaukee's Only Christmas Music Station". WMYX later did play a set of All-Christmas music, from Noon on Christmas Eve through Christmas Day.

For several years in the 2000s, 99.1 would jokingly "stunt" for an hour after ending the Christmas music, playing on radio fans on online industry message boards who would often predict a format flip on December 26, no matter WMYX's ratings standing and listener loyalty. In 2003, WMYX ran several liners alluding to a format change, including playing a few non-AC songs. In 2004, "Magic 99" was on for an hour, playing a mix of smooth jazz and light instrumentals (before the announcer gave up mid-liner and gave away the joke). In 2006, WMYX briefly flipped to Contemporary Christian music, similar to K-Love and the then-independent WFZH, calling itself "Spirit 99".

== HD2 sub-channel ==
WMYX's HD2 subchannel formerly carried a blues music format called "The Delta". In 2017, Radio Disney returned to Milwaukee through a leased access agreement in several markets between Entercom and The Walt Disney Company. Until 2013, the Radio Disney network had been heard on WKSH (1640; currently Relevant Radio station WSJP).

Radio Disney programming ended in mid-August 2018, when Entercom and Envision Networks entered an agreement for WMYX-HD2 to begin carrying Weigel Broadcasting's MeTV FM. Officially, it serves as a repeater of the audio of television station WRME-LD in Chicago, which operates a side-channel analog audio stream on channel 6 audible through 87.7 FM on analog radios in Chicago under special FCC authorization. Through the Audacy app, it is available nationwide, thus freeing Weigel from the responsibility of hosting the audio stream of WRME-LD otherwise.

The HD2 subchannel is cross-promoted through MeTV owned-and-operated station WBME-CD (channels 41.1/58.2).

=== HD3 sub-channel ===
In December 2021, WMYX activated a third HD sub-channel under a brokered programming agreement with El Sol Broadcasting to air a Regional Mexican format, branded as “Caliente 97.9”. The format is relayed on El Sol-owned translator W250BN (97.9 FM), which formerly relayed its AM station, WJTI (1460 AM, itself now translated via W273DQ, 102.5 FM). That HD subchannel is made available by El Sol through its website, and is not heard on the Audacy streaming platform and mobile app.

Broadcast translator for WMYX-FM HD3
Call sign	Frequency	City of license	FID	ERP (W)	Class	Transmitter coordinates	FCC info
W250BN	97.9 FM	Milwaukee, Wisconsin	155293	250	D	43°2′20.1″N 87°55′4.3″W	LMS
