= WKLH =

Radio station in Milwaukee

Coordinates: 43.097°N 87.905°W

- Milwaukee, Wisconsin; United States
- Broadcast area: Milwaukee metropolitan area
- Frequency: 96.5 MHz (HD Radio)
- Branding: Classic Rock 96-5

Programming
- Format: Classic rock
- Affiliations: Compass Media Networks; United Stations Radio Networks

Ownership
- Owner: Saga Communications; (Lakefront Communications, LLC)
- Sister stations: WHQG; WJMR-FM; WJOI; WRXS

History
- First air date: June 26, 1956 (as WFMR)
- Former call signs: WFMR (1956–1983); WMGF (1983–1986)
- Call sign meaning: For an earlier iteration of the classic hits format phonetically before station shifted to classic rock

Technical information
- Licensing authority: FCC
- Facility ID: 36370
- Class: B
- ERP: 20,000 watts
- HAAT: 247 meters (810 ft)

Links
- Public license information: Public file; LMS
- Webcast: Listen live
- Website: www.wklh.com

WKLH (96.5 FM) is a classic rock-formatted radio station in Milwaukee, Wisconsin, United States. The station is owned by Saga Communications, and operates as part of the Milwaukee Radio Group. Its studios are located on Milwaukee's West Side, and the transmitter is on the MPTV tower in Shorewood.

WKLH broadcasts in the digital hybrid HD Radio format.

== History ==
=== Classical (1956–1983) ===
The station received its Federal Communications Commission (FCC) license on November 30, 1955. They signed on the air as WFMR on June 26, 1956, with a classical music format from the Bayshore shopping center in Glendale, with an effective radiated power (ERP) of 24.5 kilowatts and an antenna height of 35 feet (11 m) above average terrain (HAAT). They began broadcasting in stereo in 1962. In June 1969, it boosted its power to 40 kW, becoming the most powerful FM station in Milwaukee at that time. They got another power upgrade in July 1974, this time to 50 kW.

=== Adult contemporary (1983–1986) ===
In January 1983, the station's owners switched the format to adult contemporary, picking up the call sign WMGF and named the station Magic 96.5. Three months later, on April 27, 1983, the owner of WXJY picked up the WFMR call sign, its classical music format, and several of its air talents.

=== Classic hits (1986–2005) ===
WMGF carried on for three years until flipping formats to classic hits as WKLH on January 27, 1986. WKLH was an immediate success, almost tripling its ratings and landing in the top five stations in the market in its first ratings book.

=== Classic rock (2005–present) ===
The station tweaked its format to classic rock in early 2005, as the classic hits format itself in the industry drifted towards a more pop-leaning sound with 1980s and early-'90s music. WKLH has long been a ratings success in the Milwaukee area, and has also won many awards, including Radio & Records "Classic Rock Station of the Year" in 2001. On April 23, 2015, WKLH rebranded as "Hometown Rock 96.5". The station's name was later changed to "Classic Rock 96-5."

The WKLH call letters previously belonged to an AM/FM pair of stations in St. Johns, Michigan, from October 1983 to September 1985, now known as WWSJ and WQTX, respectively. From 1973 to 1977, the WKLH call letters resided on what is now known as WLWI-FM in Montgomery, Alabama.

== Dave and Carole ==
The Dave and Carole morning show dominated the Milwaukee radio ratings since WKLH debuted in 1986. Based on a yearly 4-rating book average, the show finished either #1 or #2 in Adults 25–54 for 22 consecutive years.

The show was hosted by Dave Luczak and Carole Caine, who did the news and added the "female" perspective. The other regular was Kevin "KB" Brandt, a former stand-up comedian and a musician who also performs in several local bands. Since early 2002, the show has been produced by Marcus Allen.

During its 20+ year run, the show featured a rotating cast. Regulars have included many current or former athletes and coaches. These include former Milwaukee Brewer Paul Molitor, former Brewer manager Phil Garner, then-Green Bay Packer coach Mike Holmgren, QB Brett Favre, defensive lineman Kabeer Gbaja-Biamila, and former Brewer pitching coach Mike Maddux. Other sports guests include LeRoy Butler, a member of the Packer Hall of Fame and Jason Wilde of the Wisconsin State Journal, twice Wisconsin sports writer of the year and famed glee club aficionado.

Other current or former regular cast members include Mike Gousha from WISN-TV in Milwaukee, improv master Dylan Bolin "Out Of The Box", Segway King Angelo "Mort" Snotlocker, Rudy "Itchy" Itchkowski, Gino (The Judge) Salomone, "Mr. Angry", Dutch "Wandering Wisconsin", Joyce Garbaciak from WISN-TV, Katrina Cravy from WITI, Greg "The Gristleman" Koch, John McGivern, Willy Porter, Genesis touring guitarist Daryl Stuermer and more.

Dave and Carole have also hosted hundreds of thousands of comedians in their studios. Since 1988, they have featured the weekly headliner at the Comedy Cafe in Milwaukee. Other comedy "regulars" include Fred Klett, Jim Gaffigan, Kyle Cease, Kathleen Madigan, Stephen Lynch and Wisconsin native Frank Caliendo.

Dave and Carole also produce and host many live shows in the Milwaukee area. These include their yearly "Comedy 4 Kids" at the Riverside Theater, "Dave and Carole-ing" for Christmas, their annual Christmas show also at the Riverside Theater, and the "Music of the Morning 'KLH" featuring the talented musicians of the morning show. All of these shows are fund raisers for their various charity endeavors and all shows typically sell out within seconds.

On June 29, 2015, Carole Caine was let go by Saga after her contract was not renewed, ending a 29-year career at WKLH. In December 2024, Dave Luczak announced his retirement. He was replaced as morning host by Dave Coombs, who had hosted middays.

== Miracle Marathon ==
Once every year starting in 1998, WKLH's morning show hosts the "Miracle Marathon" to raise money for Children's Hospital of Wisconsin. Over the course of three days in 2008, they raised over $1.4 million.
