= WSSP =

Sports radio station in Milwaukee

- Milwaukee, Wisconsin; United States
- Broadcast area: Milwaukee metropolitan area
- Frequencies: 1250 kHz; SiriusXM channel 182
- Branding: 105-7 The Fan

Programming
- Format: Sports radio
- Affiliations: BetMGM Network; Westwood One Sports

Ownership
- Owner: Audacy, Inc.; (Audacy License, LLC)
- Sister stations: WMYX-FM; WXSS

History
- First air date: March 24, 1948
- Former call signs: WMAW (1948–52); WCAN (1952–55); WEMP (1955–2004)
- Call sign meaning: "Wisconsin Sports"

Technical information
- Licensing authority: FCC
- Facility ID: 27030
- Class: B
- Power: 5,000 watts
- Transmitter coordinates: 42°56′46.05″N 88°3′39.31″W
- Translator: WXSS-HD2: 105.7 W289CB (Milwaukee)
- Repeater: (103.7-2) WXSS-HD2 (Wauwatosa)

Links
- Public license information: Public file; LMS
- Webcast: Listen live (via Audacy)
- Website: www.audacy.com/thefanmilwaukee

WSSP (1250 AM) is a commercial radio station in Milwaukee, Wisconsin, owned by Audacy, Inc. It airs a sports radio format known as "105-7 The Fan". Most of its programs are from Westwood One Sports and the BetMGM Network.

WSSP is a Class B AM station, powered at 5,000 watts. To protect other stations on 1250 AM from interference, it uses a directional antenna with a four-tower array. The studios and transmitter are co-located on West Grange Avenue in Hales Corners.

== History ==
=== WMAW and WCAN ===
The 1250 AM facility went on the air as WMAW on March 24, 1948. On August 16, 1948, the 5,000-watt station became the area's affiliate of the ABC Radio Network. In June 1952, the call sign changed to WCAN. Station owner Lou Poller eventually started WCAN-TV (channel 25), one of the earliest UHF stations in the United States and an affiliate of the CBS Television Network, before CBS itself purchased rival UHF station WOKY-TV.

=== WEMP ===
In 1955, Poller sold the 1250 AM license to the owners of WEMP (1340 AM). The new owners moved the WEMP call sign to 1250 kHz; the station at 1340 AM, under new ownership, became WRIT and today is WJOI.

Over the years, WEMP aired a variety of formats, including Top 40, country music and adult contemporary. In January 1984, WEMP switched to oldies, featuring personalities such as John Gardner, Dick Alpert and Ernie Bottom. During the 1990s, WEMP ran Westwood One's syndicated oldies format with Gardner doing a local show in morning drive time. In August 1998, WEMP switched its format to brokered Christian talk and teaching after airing a Green Bay Packers preseason game (WEMP served as a longtime sports rights overflow station for WTMJ if the Packers and Brewers played at the same time).

=== Sports radio ===
Leading up to New Year's Day 2005, WEMP began stunting with a loop of Bobby Bare's "Drop Kick Me Jesus Through The Goalposts of Life". The novelty song made reference to both religion (the old format) and football (previewing a new format).

AM 1250 became an all-sports station on January 1, 2005. The new call sign, WSSP, stood for "Wisconsin Sports". Longtime Milwaukee broadcaster Chuck Garbedian anchored the morning show with Chicago native Johnny Vonn. Veteran sports talk show host Peter Brown was tabbed to do afternoon drive.

In late 2006, the sports station underwent a period of change. Program director Chip Ramsey, who had been with WSSP since it signed on in the sports format, was fired on August 9, 2006. He was replaced by Ryan Maguire, who directed a series of moves soon after. Weekday afternoon talk show host Peter Brown was fired on December 7, 2006. Mid-day hosts Cliff Saunders and Gary Ellerson were moved into Brown's slot. Morning show host Chuck Garbedian was let go in early January 2007. He was replaced by former WTMJ and Sporting News Radio personality Doug Russell, a Milwaukee native.

In 2006, WSSP acquired the rights to University of Wisconsin–Madison hockey games and coaches shows. Mike Wickett, who worked closely with Maguire when both were on the air at WTKA in Ann Arbor, Michigan, was hired to co-host mornings with Russell. Steve Fifer was tabbed to host the 9-11 a.m. shift.

In June 2007, the station acquired the rights to Milwaukee Admirals hockey, taking them away from cross-town rival WAUK. The contract ran up until the 2017-18 AHL season, when WOKY "The Big 920" acquired the rights.

The station modified its lineup in September 2008 using existing hosts in new positions. Cliff Saunders was moved into the morning slot after Doug Russell and Mike Wickett. Gary Ellerson stayed in the afternoon drive slot where he is joined by Josh Vernier and former morning host Steve Fifer as part of the "Big Show". In October 2008, Saunders was replaced by the nationally syndicated Dan Patrick Show.

In January 2009, Maguire left WSSP for Entercom sister station KCSP in Kansas City, Missouri. Former WTMJ program director Tom Parker replaced Maguire at WSSP. Jim Rome's syndicated show was replaced by Bill "The Big Unit" Michaels, formerly of WTMJ and the pre-game and post-game shows of the Packers Radio Network, in the summer of 2011. Entercom began syndicating The Bill Michaels Show across the state for live or tape-delayed airing the same day. WSSP also aired syndicated programming from Fox Sports Radio until the end of 2012. On January 1, 2013, WSSP became a CBS Sports Radio affiliate.

From October 2010 to October 2020, WSSP programming was heard on an HD Radio digital subchannel of co-owned 103.7 WXSS. In July 2014, WSSP began broadcasting on FM translator station W289CB at 105.7 FM. On October 1, 2014, the station rebranded using the translator's dial position as "105.7 The Fan".

In November 2018, the Milwaukee radio market got two new sports stations in the same month, both on the FM dial. WKTI (94.5 FM), owned by Good Karma Brands, flipped to sports at the beginning of the month. Three weeks later, WRNW (97.3 FM), owned by iHeartMedia, did the same. That left WSSP with only its AM signal and a 250-watt translator, competing against two full-power Class B FM sports stations.

On October 5, 2020, Entercom announced that WSSP would no longer be heard on the 105.7 FM translator, and the translator became a brand extension of WXSS as "Hot 105.7", carrying an urban contemporary format. WSSP would revert its branding to "1250 The Fan". On August 16, 2022, WSSP ended all local programming in Milwaukee, laid off its entire air staff, and converted to a near full-time feed of CBS Sports Radio outside a rebroadcast of WXSS's Sunday morning public affairs programming. The changes in programming were made as part of nationwide cuts to Audacy stations.

On October 14, 2024, WSSP resumed both simulcasting on FM translator W289CB 105.7 FM Milwaukee and its "105.7 The Fan" branding, along with a full weekday schedule of local sports programming, including a mid-morning program hosted by former Packers placekicker Mason Crosby.

== Wisconsin Sports Radio Network ==
Beginning on October 14, 2025, the station's programming is syndicated to four Midwest Communications stations, branded as the Wisconsin Sports Radio Network. It is made up of WNFL in Green Bay, WDKF in Sturgeon Bay, WRIG in the Wausau market, and WDSM in Duluth–Superior. In the fall of 2026, WSSP also became a part of SiriusXM as part of Audacy's agreement to offer its sports and all news radio stations on the platform, airing on channel 182.
