= WFMR (Milwaukee) =

Radio station in Milwaukee (1956–2007)

- Milwaukee, Wisconsin; United States
- Frequencies: 96.5 MHz (1956–1983); 98.3 MHz (1983–2000); 106.9 MHz (2000–2007)

Programming
- Format: Classical music

Ownership
- Owner: Saga Communications

History
- First air date: June 26, 1956
- Last air date: June 26, 2007
- Call sign meaning: "Wisconsin's Fine Music Radio"

Links
- Website: Archived WFMR website

WFMR was a classical music radio station that existed on three different FM frequencies around Milwaukee, Wisconsin, United States, during its 51-year history. Its last frequency was 106.9 MHz.

== History ==
Originally at 96.5 on the FM dial, WFMR signed on the air with a classical music format on June 26, 1956, from the Bayshore Shopping Center in Glendale, and was owned by the High Fidelity Broadcasting Corporation which was made up of principals James Baker and Hugo Koeth Jr. (Koeth later started 93.3 WQFM in 1958.) The next year, the studios moved to downtown Milwaukee, at 606 West Wisconsin Avenue. The 50,000-watt transmitter (the most powerful allowed by the FCC) was located in a room on the top floor of the 20-story structure—just outside the studio. After Bill Dunn and partners sold the station to Koss Broadcasting (John Koss of Koss Corporation), the studios were moved to the north side of the city, at 711 West Capitol Drive (not to be confused with the WTMJ station's "Radio City", which nearly has the same address number of 720, but on East Capitol Drive, fourteen blocks away).

In 1983, the station was sold and flipped to an adult contemporary format with the call letters WMGF, eventually becoming classic hits heritage station WKLH. The owner of a radio station in suburban Menomonee Falls, WXJY (98.3 FM), immediately picked up the classical format and later the WFMR call letters. The station remained at that frequency until December 12, 2000, when WKLH owner Saga Communications (who had purchased WXJY in 1997) moved it to the Brookfield-licensed 106.9 FM, using its old frequency of 98.3 for WJMR-FM's urban AC format and call letters. This was done primarily to boost WJMR-FM's signal in the urban areas of Milwaukee, and to target WFMR toward the western and northern suburbs. Saga moved the studios to Milwaukee the year before, in 1999.

During its time as a classical music station, WFMR was a four-time finalist for the National Association of Broadcasters' Marconi Award for Classical Station of the Year, and celebrated its 50th year as a classical station in 2006.

At midnight on June 26, 2007, on the 51st anniversary of its original sign-on, WFMR ended its classical music format when it flipped to a smooth jazz format. The decision was made when a rival station, WJZI, dropped the format a week earlier for light adult contemporary music. Just days after the flip, KING-FM in Seattle posted a banner on the Milwaukee Journal Sentinel website telling listeners that they have a new place to turn to for classical music by going to their website. Wisconsin Public Radio (WPR) eventually launched its HD Radio-only All Classical service on WHAD (90.7) to serve the market over-the-air, though it was unavailable on the analog band until 2024, when a realighment of WPR's networks saw WHAD join the WPR Music network, which primarily carries classical music.

On July 15, 2007, the station changed its call sign to WJZX. The callsign passed in early 2008 to WOMR in Provincetown, Massachusetts, to be used as a repeater. WFMR in Orleans, Massachusetts, signed on September 16, 2010, according to the originating station WOMR in Provincetown. The WFMR callsign now stands for "Furthermost Radio".

Former WFMR program director and morning host Steve Murphy is now heard on a nationally syndicated morning show on the World Classical Network.

Classical music is still heard in the area on analog radio, from a Brookfield-licensed station; Brookside Baptist Church's low-power FM station, WBQR-LP (104.3), whose signal range is limited to the Interstate 41 corridor in eastern Waukesha County and western Milwaukee County. WBQR-LP carries an automated classical playlist when the church is not holding services. On a full power signal, WHAD at 90.7 Mhz (owned by Wisconsin Public Radio) airs WPR's classical music network.

== See also ==
- WKLH
- WJMR-FM
- WRXS
