= Bob & Brian =

Talk radio show broadcast in Milwaukee, Wisconsin, U.S.

A logo from Bob And Brian In The Morning

Bob and Brian is a talk radio show broadcast from WHQG in Milwaukee, Wisconsin. Topics of discussion include politics, celebrity gossip, and sports, along with the random daily events.

The show broadcasts weekdays from 6:00 a.m. to 10:00 a.m. and repeats as a week-in-review show on Saturday mornings.

Longtime friends who grew up in Union Grove, Wisconsin, Bob Madden and Brian Nelson went to high school and technical college together before teaming up to work in radio in January 1981. They had brief stints for stations in Florida, Missouri, Michigan, and Toledo, Ohio, before moving to Milwaukee's "Lazer 103" (WLZR) on July 20, 1987 (WLZR has since become WHQG).

== Affiliates ==
- WHQG 102.9 FM "The Hog" Milwaukee - Flagship

=== Former affiliates ===
- WAPL 105.7 FM "The Rockin' Apple" Appleton
- WNFL 1440 AM Green Bay
- WTLX 100.5 FM "ESPN Radio" Madison
- WWHG 105.9 FM "The Hog" Janesville
- WWWX 96.9 FM "The Fox" Oshkosh/Fox Valley
- WMZK 104.1 FM "Z104" Wausau/Medford

== Cast ==
=== Current ===
- Bob Madden, 'The Voice Of Beef' — Host (1987-Current)
- Brian Nelson, 'The Gangster Of Love' — Host (1987-Current)
- Eric 'Rock' Jensen — Producer (1996-Current)
- Carrie Wendt, 'The First Lady Of WI News' — News (1999-Current)
- Stephanie 'Sportsbabe' Sutton — News Fill-in (2010-Current)
- Tim Murray — Sports (2018-Current)

=== Former ===
- Air Marshall Pedersen — Air Safety (1995–1998); Softball (1998)
- Dan Patrick — Sports (1989–1995)
- Dorene 'Firegirl' Michaels — News & Traffic (????-2004)
- Drew Olson— Brewers/Baseball Wednesday's (1997-2016)
- Duane Gay (1956-2005 RIP) — Guest Commentator; News Fill-in (199X-2005)
- Jeff Miller aka 'The Hawk' & 'Jeffrey Goodjudgement' — Producer; (1989–1996)
- Liz Borden — Traffic (1992–1997); News (1997–1999)
- Marilynn Mee — News (1989-1997); 'Jackpot Girl' (1989-2005)
- Mark Patrick — Sports (1995–1997)
- 'Sports Donkey', Steve Czaban — Sports (1997-2018)
- Steve 'Consumer of Caffeine' Radke — Backup Producer (????-2011)

== Segments ==
=== Daily ===
- "Who's The Stiff?" (7:00) — A game show pitting two phone-in contestants against each other, with up to five randomly drawn questions. The loser of each round, and the game, is "The Stiff". Daily prizes are awarded and winners are entered into a drawing for a getaway vacation.
- "Show Biz News" (7:20) - Bob and Brian's daily recap of the celebrity news from the previous day.
- "Sports (8:10) — with Tim Murray" ('It's Raining Men' by The Weather Girls)
- "This Day in History" (9:20) — Brian recaps the significant events, births, and deaths of that particular day in history.
- "One Question Line" (9:45) — Viewers are allowed to ask a single question. Callers are reminded not to say "Can you tell me ?" "DO you know ? "I was wondering" or "My question is"

=== Weekly ===
- Fireman Jim/ Baseball Expert (Baseball report on Wednesdays)
- Gary Graff/ Rabbi of Rock (Music Report on Fridays)

=== Occasional Guests ===
- A. J. Christopher — much-traveled veteran disc jockey
- Joe Panos aka "Mr. Halloween" ("Dance For Halloween" by Chris McKhool) — former offensive lineman for the Philadelphia Eagles and Buffalo Bills in the NFL; unofficial goodwill ambassador for the Halloween season
- Jimmy 'Masterlock' Dugan ('Viva Las Vegas' by Elvis Presley) — gambling "expert". Calls in on Fridays during football season to give his picks
- Keith Tozer ("Ole Ole Ole") — retired soccer player who coaches the Milwaukee Wave of Major Indoor Soccer League
- Kirk Rocker — shock jock who talks about "the Man"
- Matt Kenseth ("Dirt Track Date" by Southern Culture on the Skids) — interviewed each Thursday during NASCAR racing season
- Mark Metcalf ("Shama Lama Ding Dong" by Lloyd Williams) — actor who discusses movie news and reviews (was a weekly segment through May 2013)
- Mike Toomey ("Batman Theme" from TV series) — comedian and master impersonator
- Santana Dotson ("Atomic Dog" by George Clinton) — interviewed each Monday, with repeats on Tuesday, during the National Football League season to give his insights
- Seth Grunlode ("Shambala" by Three Dog Night) — Lost expert
- 'Skip' — baseball sportswriter with Tourette syndrome
- The Boogie Men — local Milwaukee Band
- Vern Cunningham aka 'Vern the Carny' — hard of hearing carnie who talks about life at the fair

=== Occasional segments ===
- Fan Letters — Listeners are given the opportunity to send in stories on various themes throughout the year. The debut series involved boat launch disasters. Letters are eligible for a grand prize.

Topics of fan letters:

- All My Packers
- Bad Breakups
- Bad Camping
- Bad First Dates
- Bad Job Interview Stories
- Bad Roommates
- Boat Launch Stories
- Bureaucracy
- Father Knows Least
- First Car
- Football Tales
- Great Outdoors
- Gym Class Stories
- Holiday Horror Stories
- Home Destruction
- Hunting
- Lawn Care Disasters
- Meals Gone Wrong
- Shortest Job
- Smashed In The Face
- Tee'd Off Golfing
- Vacation Disasters
- We're Thinking Of A Brewer
- Wedding Disasters
- Worst Jobs
- Wreck The Halls
- Where You Goin', What You takin' — Take calls from listeners usually around major holidays and simply ask "Where you goin', what you takin'".

== Charitable Contributions ==
B&B event logos

- 28 Hour Radiothon — During the second week in April, B&B host the 28-hour Radiothon for the Midwest Athletes Against Childhood Cancer (MACC Fund). The Radiothon includes guest interviews with those in the sports and entertainment industry.
- Gutter Bowl — On the last Friday of February, Bob and Brian host a bowling tournament to raise money for the Leukemia and Lymphoma Society of Wisconsin. During the event, items are given out and contests are held.
- HOG For Hunger — November around Thanksgiving, the Bob & Brian crew, along with the other rock jocks at the station, have a three-day remote broadcast where they seek food donations for the Hunger Task Force of Milwaukee.
- OPEN Golf Outing — Wisconsin's largest charity golf tournament, held annually on the last Friday in July. Money is raised by purchasing golfing spots.
- Plane Pull — Hosted every October, the Midwest Airlines-sponsored event features 30 teams of 12 attempting to pull a Midwest Airlines aircraft 15 feet across a tarmac in less than 10 seconds. Teams compete for the top prize of roundtrip travel to any Midwest Airlines destination. Money raised goes to the Midwest Athletes Against Childhood Cancer (MACC) Fund.

== Compilation Albums ==
Bob And Brian CD covers from 2011, 2010, 2009, & 2008

Bob and Brian annually release albums containing highlights of the broadcasting year. The cover artwork is illustrated by local Milwaukeean Matt Zumbo. Proceeds from the album sales go to the Hunger Task Force of Milwaukee and the MACC Fund.

Bob & Brian Albums
Year	Release
2026	Hollywood Hood Ride
2025	Queen's Request
2024	Space Apes
2023	Crash Test Polka
2022	Liberknievelis
2021	Mustache Fights
2020	Magnificent Bastards
2019	Sockets Of Mandoor
2018	Feces Flingin' Mad
2017	Vortex Of Tragedy
2016	Dumpster Fulla Bums
2015	Yankee Doodle S.O.B.
2014	Shut Yer Gob
2013	Toilet Cat
2012	Average Looking Donkeys
2011	Scrapbook Of Hate
2010	Lick'n The Beaters
2009	MyFaceTube
2008	Pounded Clowns
2007	Premium Hair Ring
2006	The Adventures Of Captain Wizzo
2005	Mexican Bologna Roll
2004	Stench Ranch
2003	Albanian Love Stories
2002	Horrifying Zubaz
2001	By The Numbers
2000	Very Close Enemies
1999	What A Blast
1998	Strange Load
1997	Warning: Do Not Eat The Contents Of This Package
1996	Individually Twisted
1995	Tahellwitchoo
1994	Ripped
1993	All My Packers II
1992	All My Packers
