= Downtown Julie Brown =

English-born actress and television presenter

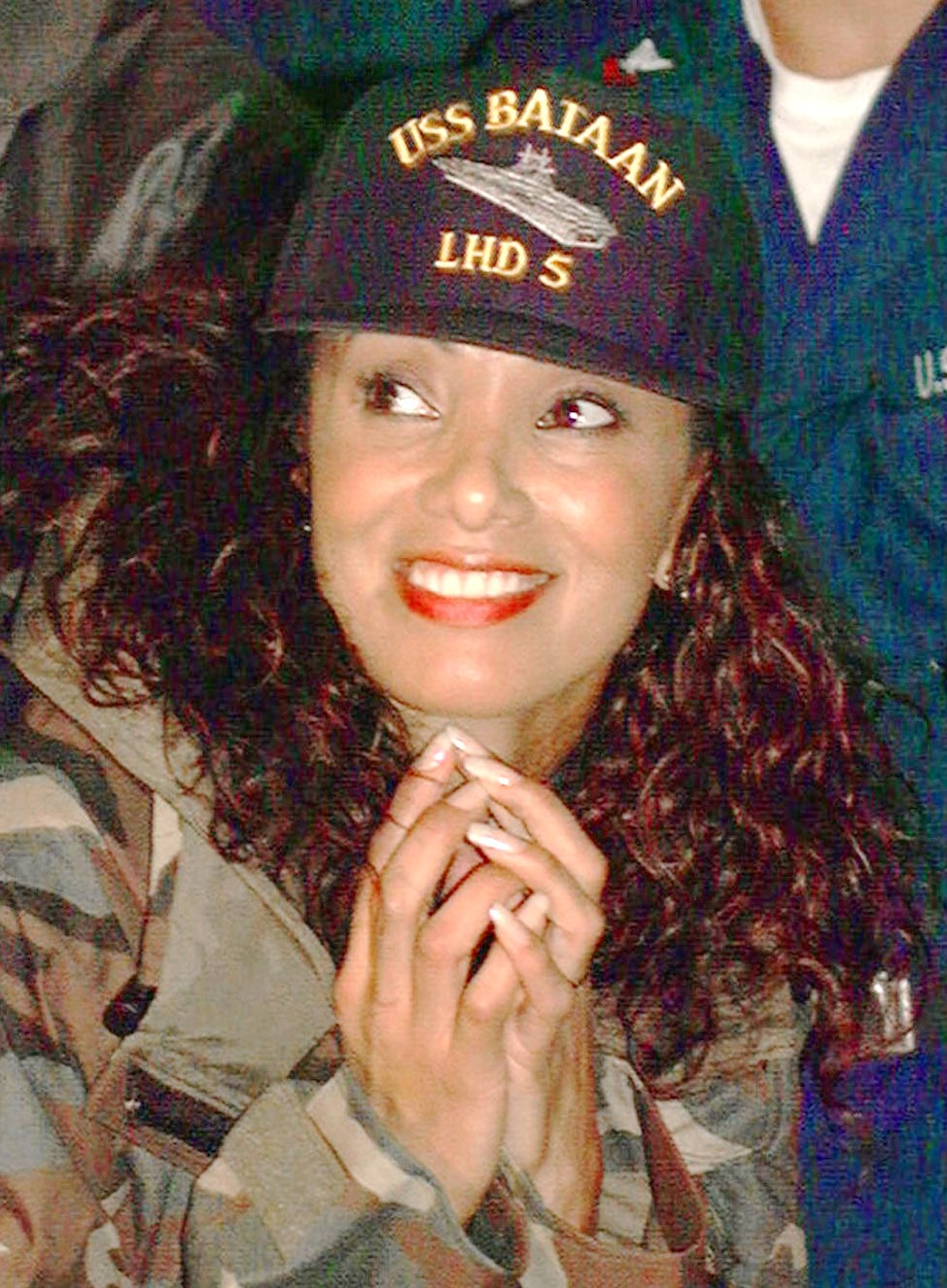
- Brown in a USO show, 1999
- Born: Julie Dorne Brown; Bedfordshire, England
- Occupations: Television personality; actress; DJ
- Years active: 1981–present
- Known for: Club MTV – VJ (1987–1992)
- Spouse: Martin Schuermann (m. 2001)
- Children: 1

Julie Dorne Brown, better known as Downtown Julie Brown, is a British-born actress, dancer, television personality, SiriusXM DJ and former MTV VJ. Brown is best known as the host of the television music show Club MTV, which ran from 1987 until 1992.

== Early Life ==
Brown's father was Jamaican and her mother British. Brown has six siblings. Her father was in the Royal Air Force, and she grew up on air force bases around the world, including Singapore and Cyprus, before returning to the United Kingdom, where they settled in Bridgend, Wales.

== Career ==
After winning the UK Disco Dancing Championships, she went on to win the World Disco Dancing Championship in 1979. Soon after, Brown began a career on British television as presenter and guest on a number of children's programmes, including the long-running show Crackerjack. Brown also appeared as a dancer on Top of the Pops in the early 1980s as a member of the dance troupe Zoo.

Brown became a presenter on the pan-European music channel Music Box and, after moving to the United States, eventually became an MTV VJ. Her personality as a host has been described as "brash (and) foul-mouthed." She had a rivalry both on- and off-air with another VJ, Adam Curry.

She went on to host the Club MTV show in the late 1980s. That show had a format similar to American Bandstand's but featured an exclusive lineup of dance music. From this came her catchphrase, "Wubba Wubba Wubba", after she accidentally read the T-shirt of a camera crewmember who was holding the cue cards while on live TV.

MTV capitalized on the confusion between Downtown Julie Brown and comic actress Julie Brown by sending the pair together as correspondents for MTV News as well as by their "facing" each other on both their shows (Club MTV and Just Say Julie).

After leaving MTV, Brown went on to work for ESPN conducting on- and off-field interviews with football athletes. Brown then moved to Los Angeles to host the E! channel's gossip show. She also became the host of the syndicated radio program American Dance Traxx in March 1992 until its final broadcast in December 1993.

Brown has appeared in a number of movies and TV shows, including Sharknado 5: Global Swarming; Spy Hard; Spring Break '83; The Weird Al Show; B*A*P*S; Ride; Walker, Texas Ranger; Battle Dome; Hey Arnold!; I'm a Celebrity, Get Me Out of Here!; The Dog Whisperer; The Eric Andre Show; Kenan & Kel; and RuPaul's Drag U.

She appeared in television's Wife Swap on 21 July 2013. She also appeared on the cover and posed nude for the August 1998 edition of Playboy. Brown is currently a host on the SiriusXM channel '90s on 9. In addition to hosting programmes, she also hosts The Back in The Day Replay Countdown, on which are played the 30 biggest songs of the week from a particular year in the 1990s.

== Personal life ==
During the 1980s, Brown was engaged. The engagement lasted approximately five years before she broke it off. While working as an MTV VJ, Brown dated John Salley and Billy Idol.

Brown married film producer and former CEO of Intermedia Martin Schuermann in 2001. They live in Marina del Rey, California, with their daughter.

== Filmography ==
=== Film ===
Year	Title	Role	Notes
1995	Fist of the North Star	Charlotte 'Charlie'	
1996	Spy Hard	Cigarette Girl	
1996	On Seventh Avenue	Francesca	TV movie
1997	B.A.P.S.	Herself	
1998	Ride	Bleau Kelly	
1998	Bug Buster	Katie Cunning	
1999	When	Mrs. Stephany	
2000	Shadow Hours	Speaker	
2000	Daybreak	Connie Spheres	
2001	The Homeboy	Tallulah Jones	
2014	Sharknado 2: The Second One	Nurse Fletcher	TV movie
2017	Sandy Wexler	Testimonial	
2017	Sharknado 5: Global Swarming	Consigliere	TV movie
2022	Christmas in the Caribbean	Ellie	

=== Television ===
Year	Title	Role	Notes
1981	Top of the Pops	Herself	Episode: "Episode #18.15"
1982	Record Breakers	Herself	Episode: "All Star Record Breakers 1982"
1982–83	Crackerjack!	Herself	Main Cast: Season 27–28
1985	Wacaday	Genie of the Kettle	Episode: "WAC-AYAY Panto"
1986–87	MTV Video Music Awards	Herself/Co-Host	Main Co-Host
1987	120 Minutes	Herself/Host	Main Host
1987–92	Club MTV	Herself/Host	Main Host
1989	The New Hollywood Squares	Herself/Panelist	Episode: "6 February 1989"
1990–92	Square One Television	Herself	Guest Cast: Season 3–5
1992	Circus of the Stars and Sideshow	Herself/Co-Host	Main Co-Host
1992–93	It's Showtime at the Apollo	Herself/Guest Host	Recurring Guest Host: Season 6
1993	Loving	Sam	Regular Cast
1995	Burke's Law	Paige Sinclair	Episode: "Who Killed the Lifeguard?"
1995	Dream On	Herself	Episode: "Music in My Veins: Part II"
1995	The Crew	Anita Cooper	Episode: "Around the World in 80 Ways (The T&A of PSA?)"
1995	Deadly Games	Herself	Episode: "The Motivational Speaker"
1996	Stand Up Comedy Specials	Herself	Episode: "Downtown Julie Brown"
1997	Behind the Music	Herself	Episode: "Milli Vanilli"
1997	The Weird Al Show	Herself	Episode: "Bad Influence"
1997	Lois & Clark: The New Adventures of Superman	Samantha	Episode: "Sex, Lies and Videotape"
1997	The Parent 'Hood	Herself	Episode: "Don't Go There"
1998	Walker, Texas Ranger	Cassandra	Episode: "The Children of Halloween"
1999	Hey Arnold!	Reporter (voice)	Episode: "It Girl/Deconstructing Arnold"
1999	Kenan & Kel	Herself	Episode: "Aww, Here It Goes to Hollywood: Part 2"
1999	Martial Law	Celine Vashon	Episode: "Sammo Blammo"
1999	Sabrina: The Animated Series	Herself (voice)	Recurring Cast
2000	Diagnosis: Murder	Herself	Episode: "The Unluckiest Bachelor in L.A."
2000	Cousin Skeeter	Herself	Episode: "The Feminine Ms. Skeet"
2003	I'm a Celebrity...Get Me Out of Here!	Herself/Contestant	Main Cast
2003	The Greatest	Herself	Recurring Guest
2011	RuPaul's Drag U	Herself/Contestant	Episode: "80s Ladies"
2013	RuPaul's Drag Race	Herself/Guest Judge	Recurring Guest Judge: Season 5
2013	Celebrity Wife Swap	Herself	Episode: "Downtown Julie Brown/Lisa Leslie"
2013	Unsung	Herself	Episode: "Lisa Lisa & Cult Jam"
2015	Days of Our Lives	Fashion Reporter Ms. Brown	Episode: "Episode #1.12750"
2016	The Eighties	Herself	Recurring Guest
2019	80's in the Sand	Herself/Host	Main Host
2019–20	A Year in Music	Herself/Host	Recurring Host: Season 1–2
