= WLUM =

Radio station in Milwaukee

- Milwaukee, Wisconsin; United States
- Broadcast area: Greater Milwaukee
- Frequency: 102.1 MHz

Programming
- Format: Contemporary worship music
- Network: Air1

Ownership
- Owner: Educational Media Foundation; (K-LOVE, Inc)
- Sister stations: WLDB, WLVE

History
- First air date: September 1960
- Former call signs: WMKE (1960–1964); WAWA-FM (1964–1979); WLUM-FM (1979–1980, 1982–2026); WLUM (1980–1982)
- Call sign meaning: "We love you, Milwaukee", with U representing "you"

Technical information
- Licensing authority: FCC
- Facility ID: 63595
- Class: B
- ERP: 8,800 watts
- HAAT: 257 meters (843 ft)
- Transmitter coordinates: 43.112°N 87.931°W

Links
- Public license information: Public file; LMS
- Webcast: Listen live
- Website: www.air1.com

WLUM (102.1 FM) is a non-commercial radio station in Milwaukee, Wisconsin. Currently owned and operated by the Educational Media Foundation and features a Contemporary worship music format as part of the "Air1" syndicated network.

WLUM is a Class B FM station, with an effective radiated power (ERP) of 8,800 watts. The studios are on Good Hope Road in Menomonee Falls and the transmitter site is in Milwaukee's North Side, near the Milwaukee River at Lincoln Park.

== History ==
=== Showtunes (1960–1964) ===
WMKE (102.1 FM) launched in September 1960, broadcasting from studios located on North Avenue in Milwaukee with a format consisting primarily of Broadway show tunes. The owners boasted that they were the nation's first "all-tape radio station", meaning that all programming would originate from reel-to-reel tape or other tape formats, rather than phonograph records, as they believed tape delivered higher quality.

=== Gospel/R&B (1964–1979) ===
The station was later sold and became WAWA-FM in 1964. The new format featured black gospel music during the day, and also featured after sunset the rhythm and blues format of the then-sister station WAWA (1590 AM) until 1979.

=== Disco (1979–1982) ===
Former Packer legend Willie Davis purchased the two stations, and on February 14, 1979, switched WAWA-FM to WLUM (meaning "We Love U Milwaukee!"), and giving 102.1 FM its own distinct format focusing on disco music. At the time that WAWA-FM became WLUM, they also became the second station in Milwaukee to adopt the Disco format, as WNUW had already beat them to it in October 1978, even though their success would be short lived by August 1979; by this point, WLUM would shift to a rhythmic contemporary direction.

The daytime-only 1590 AM, still WAWA, on October 1, 1987, also picked up the WLUM call letters. The AM station was long hampered by a weak signal, and when All Pro Broadcasting purchased stronger 24 hour station WMVP (1290 AM), the format and programming moved there. As a result, 1590 AM went dark in 1988, and its broadcast license was turned in to the FCC.

=== Rhythmic (1982–1991) ===
In 1982, WLUM began adding more urban music. By the summer of 1983, the station's format morphed into a Rhythmic Contemporary Hits presentation with the brandings "WLUM FM 102", "WLUM 102 Milwaukee's Hot FM", "Club 102 WLUM", "Power 102 WLUM", "WLUM 102 FM". It settled on "Hot 102 WLUM", and aired a mix of dance music (including freestyle, house and club imports) and Top 40 hits (including rock and modern/alternative tracks).

By 1989, WLUM was featuring shows like "Casey's Top 40" and "American Dance Traxx" as it began to shift further towards a dance-leaning direction that was loosely patterned after Power 106 in Los Angeles. Veteran Rhythmic program director and future consultant Rick Thomas was in charge, before moving on to launch XHITZ San Diego's rhythmic format in April 1990. Also during this period, noted radio personality Bubba the Love Sponge briefly did an air shift at Hot 102.

=== Top 40 (1991–1994) ===
By late 1991, WLUM evolved into a straightforward Top 40/CHR presentation. More hip-hop was added to the playlist by the following year, to better compete with upstart rival WKKV-FM for the urban audience.

By late 1993, WLUM began shifting back to a dance-leaning direction, and used the moniker "Hot 102 WLUM, Milwaukee's Party Station". This lasted until the Summer of 1994, when it shifted back to mainstream Top 40.

=== Alternative (1994–1998) ===
By 1994, WLUM began tweaking their on-air presentation. Hip-hop was slowly being phased out and more modern rock was added to the playlist, due to Davis' desire to distance his station from the violent image of most rap and hip-hop music, after finding out that the station had begun to carry a nightly hour of uncensored music after the FCC's "safe harbor" regulations were not in effect (a record homicide count in Milwaukee and several area violent crimes also played into the re-shift). This began to occur in earnest on December 1, 1993, when Wauwatosa West High School assistant principal Dale Breitlow was murdered by a former student, and the station immediately pulled Dr. Dre's "Dre Day" and Eazy-E's "Real Compton City G's" in reaction, dropping their usual music and allowing those affected to call-in about how the shooting affected them. The modern rock music was well received by listeners, and in October of that year, the station adopted modern rock full-time, as "New Rock 102ONE", leaving the Milwaukee market without a Top 40 station until the launch of WXSS-FM in 1998.

=== Adult alternative (1998) ===
Over the years, the format underwent much tweaking. After adding more classic rock tracks to the playlist, the station shifted to an adult album alternative format at 5 p.m. on June 23, 1998, and rebranded as simply "102ONE WLUM." Artists played during this era included Rolling Stones, Nirvana, Melissa Etheridge, Led Zeppelin, Dave Matthews Band, and The Doors.

=== Active rock (1998–2002) ===
The move was unsuccessful, so in December 1998, WLUM switched to hard rock with the syndicated Mancow Muller in the morning, and rebranded again as "Rock 102ONE." They initially avoided much of the then-popular nu metal music that WLZR played, but added a great deal to the playlist by 2001. Nonetheless, they were consistently a distant second to market leader WLZR.

As a straight-ahead rock station, WLUM experienced some of its lowest ratings ever, with the bottom coming after the September 11 attacks, which caused many rock stations to shift quickly from hard rock tracks inappropriate for play in the aftermath and change away from aggressive formats.

=== Alternative (2002–2025) ===
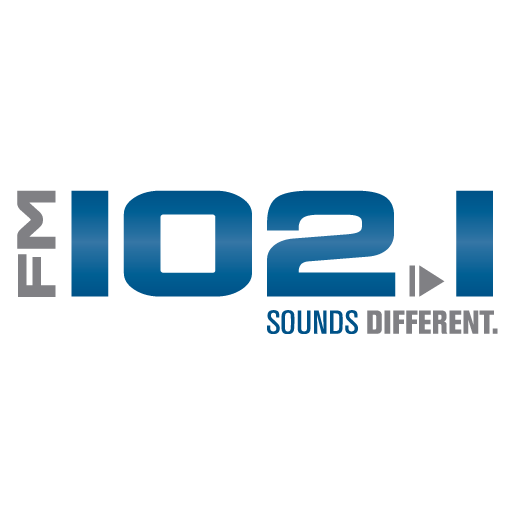
FM102.1 Logo

In March 2002, WLUM began making more changes. Mancow's morning show was dropped, along with most of the hard rock music on the playlist, and modern rock music returned to the playlist. By September, the station was once again a full-time reporter to alternative rock airplay charts for radio industry trade magazines. The station still experienced low ratings, as it worked to shake its male-oriented hard rock image. The station made heavy use of consultants who crafted a rather tight playlist. In March 2003, the Indianapolis-based Bob and Tom was added in the morning drive to compete against Bob & Brian up the dial on WLZR, but its older target audience (where it was often programmed on classic rock stations) proved wildly incompatible for the rest of WLUM's younger-skewing broadcast day.

The Bob and Tom agreement ran out in 2005, and a locally oriented morning show, "Kramp and Adler", debuted on St. Patrick's Day. This was a sign of more changes to come. On July 10, 2006, WLUM began stunting as "Quick 102" and started playing five-second song clips back-to-back. At the same time, via on-air promos, they poked fun at themselves and their many failed on-air tweaks and changes over the years. At 5:00 p.m. the next day, the modern rock format was relaunched with a new programming and on-air staff in place. The station admitted past mistakes, then announced their "independence", stating they were now free from corporate practices and radio consultants and pledged a stronger dedication to their listeners and the local community. As part of the new direction, Program Director Jacent Jackson rolled out a modified alternative rock format with a more diverse playlist, featuring, among other things, more indie rock. The first song after the relaunch was "Guerrilla Radio" by Rage Against the Machine. Jackson also added new DJs to the airstaff such as Michelle Rutkowski from WKQX in Chicago, and changed the name of the station to "FM 102.1" with the slogan, 'Independent. Alternative. Radio.' The station also removed their last remaining syndicated show, Loveline, vowing to be 100% local in their on-air presentation.

Later, the station sponsored a contest to name a new alternative rock festival on the Summerfest grounds that took place in June 2010, which became known as the "Verge Music Festival". During this time, the station also adjusted their positioning statement from 'Independent. Alternative. Radio' to 'Sounds Different.'

In 2014, Program Director Jacent Jackson departed WLUM to program KITS in San Francisco and Michelle Rutkowski took over as PD. In August 2024, afternoon host and assistant program director Ian McCain died after a brief illness.

In March 2025, longtime morning host Jonathan Adler and evening host John Schroeder exited due to budget cuts.

=== Sale to K-Love Inc. ===
On August 25, 2025, the station announced it was being purchased (along with sister station WLDB) by K-Love Inc. The religious broadcaster already operates WLVE (105.3), licensed to the community of Mukwonago in the Milwaukee-Racine market, which airs its K-Love format. Broker Bob Heymann, managing director of Media Services Group's Chicago office, says the Milwaukee Radio Alliance sale price equates to a per population price of $1.20 for each of the two stations. He says that is one of the lowest for a big market commercial station in recent memory.

The station's last full month of operation featured stunt-themed days recalling the station's history after Willie Davis's purchase of WAWA in 1979, including days themed around the "Hot 102" and "New Rock" eras, along with the station's "Retro Brunch" feature and a one-day return of Jon Adler to the station. Michelle Rutkowski, a longtime WLUM personality and vice president of MRA, was the last on-air voice on September 30. The station then became completely automated, which lasted until EMF assumed full control of WLDB and WLUM. Rutkowski, a native of Chicago, would fulfill a lifelong dream despite WLUM's end, becoming the brand manager for that market's own heritage AAA station, WXRT on October 13.

On October 28, 2025, at 7:10 p.m., WLUM-FM began airing the syndicated Air1 contemporary worship format. The final song played on "FM 102/1" was "Steady, As She Goes" by The Raconteurs.

On February 13, 2026, WLUM-FM dropped the “FM” from its call sign. It is now known as WLUM

== Big Snow Shows ==
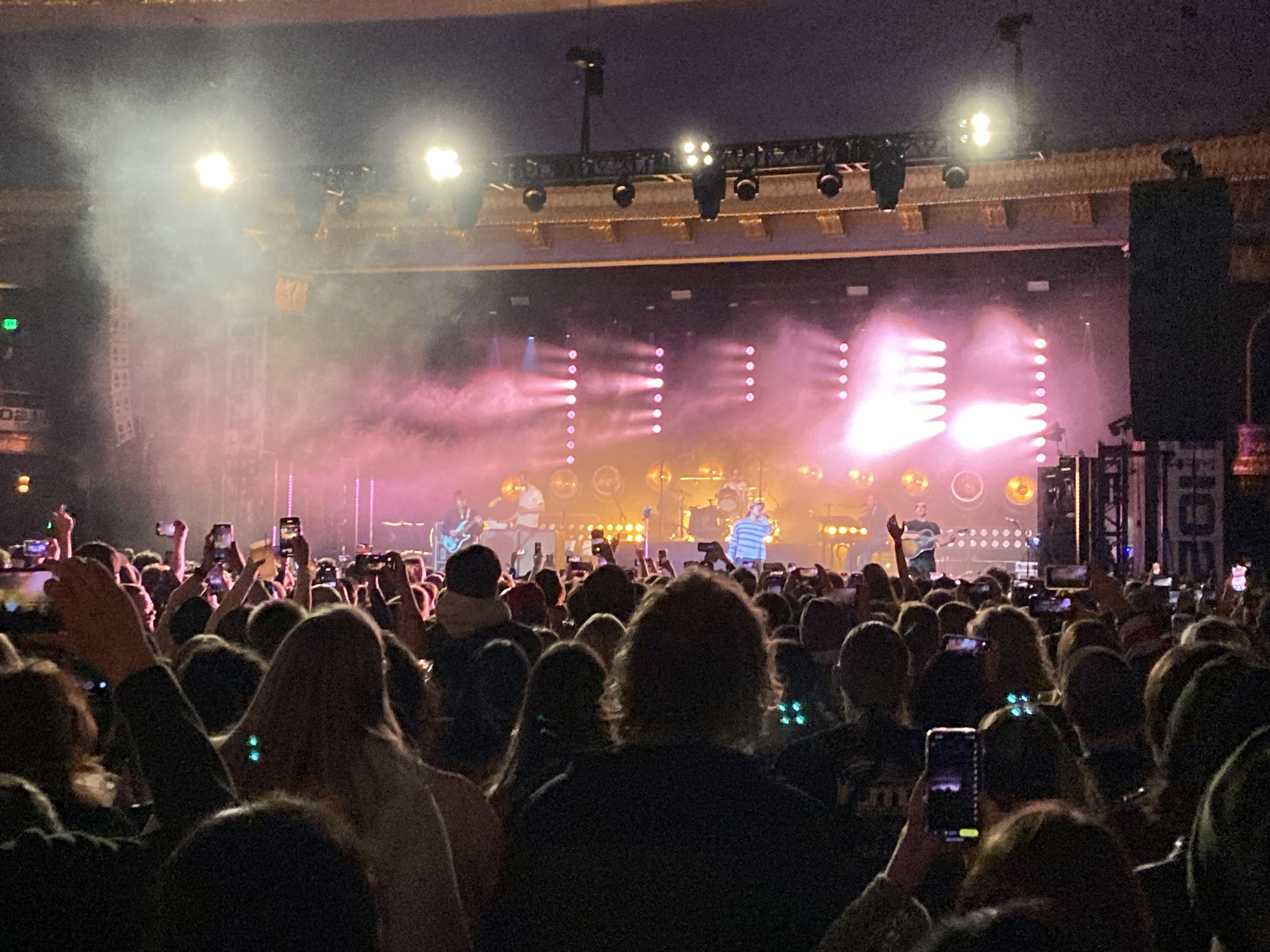
Cage the Elephant performing at Big Snow Show 18

As a part of the re-branding in 2006, FM 102/1 has held its first annual "Big Snow Show." The first including My Chemical Romance, Rise Against and Red Jumpsuit Apparatus at the Riverside Theater (Milwaukee) on Wednesday, December 13, 2006. 2007's BSS was held in the same location on Sunday, December 16 with Coheed and Cambria, Jimmy Eat World, Shiny Toy Guns and The Starting Line. In 2008, Big Snow Show 3 switched venues to The Rave/Eagles Club with headliners Death Cab For Cutie, Jack's Mannequin and The Ting Tings on Tuesday, December 2.

The following FM 102/1 Big Snow Show Lineups:

Big Snow Show 4 — Thursday, December 17, 2009 — Eagles Ballroom — After Midnight Project, Breaking Benjamin, Sick Puppies, Thirty Seconds to Mars

Big Snow Show 5 — Monday, December 13, 2010 — The Rave — CAKE, Ok Go, Switchfoot / Tuesday, December 14, 2010 — The Rave — Chevelle, Finger Eleven

Big Snow Show 6 — Thursday, December 15, 2011 — The Rave — Cage The Elephant, Sleeper Agent, The Joy Formidable

Big Snow Show 7 — Saturday, December 8, 2012 — The Rave — Silversun Pickups, The Joy Formidable, iamdynamite / (Family of the Year and Churchill performed BSS Cocktail Hour in The Rave basement)

Big Snow Show 8 — Thursday, December 12, 2013 — Eagles Ballroom — Phoenix (band), alt-j, Grouplove, Bastille / Friday, December 13, 2013 — Eagles Ballroom — Arctic Monkeys, Foals, NONONO

Big Snow Show 9 — Tuesday, December 2, 2014 — Eagles Ballroom — Cage The Elephant, Fitz and the Tantrums, Meg Myers, alt-j, Vance Joy / Tuesday, December 16, 2014 — Eagles Ballroom — Fall Out Boy, WALK THE MOON, Vinyl Theatre / The Big Snow Show Hangover show featured banks (singer) and The Living Statues in The Rave on Thursday, December 18, 2014,

Big Snow Show 10 — Thursday, December 10, 2015 — Eagles Ballroom — Weezer, X Ambassadors, Glass Animals, BORNS / Friday, December 11, 2015 — Eagles Ballroom — Of Monsters and Men, Cold War Kids, Meg Myers / Saturday, December 12, 2015 — Eagles Ballroom — Panic at the Disco, Atlas Genius, Frank Turner, JR JR

Big Snow Show 11 — Friday, December 2, 2016 — Eagles Ballroom — The Head and the Heart, Jimmy Eat World, Fitz and the Tantrums, Bishop Briggs / Thursday, December 8, 2016 — Eagles Ballroom — Bastille, Awolnation, Andrew McMahon in the Wilderness, Barns Courtney (Judah and the Lion was featured for the BSS Happy Hour in The Rave Bar)

Big Snow Show 12 — Thursday, November 30, 2017 — Eagles Ballroom — WALK THE MOON, Foster The People, AJR / Friday, December 1, 2017 — Eagles Ballroom — Paramore, Dashboard Confessional, The Wrecks / Saturday, December 2, 2017 — Eagles Ballroom — Phoenix, Lord Huron, Cold War Kids, Welshly Arms

Big Snow Show 13 — Thursday, November 27, 2018 — Eagles Ballroom — Bastille, Young The Giant, Bishop Briggs, grandson / Thursday, November 29, 2018 — The Rave — Elle King, Flora Cash / Saturday, December 1, 2018 — Eagles Ballroom — Death Cab For Cutie, Jungle, Albert Hammond Jr., Barns Courtney

Big Snow Show 14 — Thursday, December 10, 2019 — Eagles Ballroom — Cage The Elephant, Angels and Airwaves, The Federal Empire / Sunday, December 15, 2019 — The Rave — PVRIS, Misterwives, SHAED

Big Snow Show 15 1/2 — Thursday, December 9, 2021 — Eagles Ballroom — Kings of Leon, Wilderado / Tuesday, December 14, 2021 - Eagles Ballroom - The Lumineers Cold War Kids

Big Snow Show 16 - Saturday, December 10, 2022 - Eagles Ballroom - The 1975 (At Their Very Best), blackstarkids

Big Snow Show 17 - Wednesday, December 6, 2023 - Eagles Ballroom - The Black Keys, Colony House / Thursday, December 7, 2023 - Lovejoy, The Beaches, Little Image
