= Club MTV =

1987 American television series

- Presented by: Downtown Julie Brown
- Country of origin: United States
- Original language: English
- No. of episodes: 1245

Production
- Production locations: New York City, New York, U.S.

Original release
- Network: MTV
- Release: August 31, 1987 – June 26, 1992

Club MTV was a half hour television show modeled after American Bandstand that aired on MTV from August 31, 1987, to June 26, 1992. Club MTV was part of MTV's second generation of programming, as the channel was phasing out its original 5 VJs and introducing new ones.

== Format ==
Hosted by Downtown Julie Brown (Kevin Seal hosted the pilot) at The Palladium, a large dance club in New York City, the show cut back and forth between teenagers and young adults dancing to a hit music video. Musical guests often introduced their new singles. Unlike most earlier TV dance shows, it was shot in a real nightclub rather than a studio. Episodes were taped in batches of 15 over two days every six weeks, and casting director Rob Fox said he auditioned about 5,000 dancers for the roughly 120 seen in an episode. Featured dancer Camille (later Camille Grammer) appeared in the show's promos and in between-song chats with Brown.

MTV stopped production of the show in early 1992. Programming executive Doug Herzog said dance music was taking a back seat to alternative music, and that MTV wanted to end the show before viewers lost interest.

== Club MTV Tour ==
In the summer of 1989, MTV launched a Club MTV Tour featuring Was (Not Was), Information Society, Paula Abdul, Tone Loc, Lisa Lisa & Cult Jam and Milli Vanilli, with Downtown Julie Brown & the Club MTV dancers. The tour opened in Mobile, Alabama, and early ticket sales were slow; its promoter, Louis Messina, said fans assumed the artists would sing to prerecorded tracks. At one Club MTV concert, a skipping backing track exposed Milli Vanilli as lip-syncing. A later Club MTV tour in 1991 was named among that year's biggest flops in reports on weak concert ticket sales.

== Club MTV Party To Go Album ==
In 1991, Tommy Boy Records released the album Club MTV Party To Go Volume One on CD, cassette, vinyl, and Laserdisc. The songs were continuously mixed. The tracklist is:

- Turn This Mutha Out by MC Hammer
- Poison by Bell Biv Devoe
- Feels Good by Tony! Toni! Tone!
- Knocked Out by Paula Abdul
- Think by Information Society
- Play That Funky Music by Vanilla Ice
- Tom's Diner by DNA feat. Suzanne Vega
- Knockin' Boots by Candyman
- The Humpty Dance by Digital Underground
- Don't Wanna Fall In Love by Jane Child
- Personal Jesus by Depeche Mode

== Legacy ==
On March 20, 2005, VH1 Classic aired a marathon of old Club MTV episodes.

On April 25, 2020, MTV brought Club MTV back for a special, titled Club MTV: Dance Together hosted by D-Nice and Keke Palmer. The one night only event served as a fund raising benefit to help music programs during the coronavirus pandemic.

== See also ==
- The Grind
- Electric Circus
- The Party Machine with Nia Peeples
- Dance Party USA
- Amp
- Camille Donatacci (a regular dancer on the show)
- Party to Go
