= WJZI =

Decatur, Indiana; United States
- Frequency: 1540 kHz

Programming
- Format: Jazz

Ownership
- Owner: Lewis Broadcasting, LLC

History
- First air date: 1962
- Last air date: 2021
- Former call signs: WADM (1962–2011)
- Call sign meaning: "Jazz in Indiana"

Technical information
- Facility ID: 71465
- Class: D
- ERP: 250 watts daytime
- Transmitter coordinates: 40°49′14.2″N 84°55′11.9″W

Links
- Website: www.wjzi.com

WJZI (1540 AM) was a daytime-only radio station which broadcast a jazz format. Licensed to Decatur, Indiana, United States, the station was last owned by Lewis Broadcasting, LLC.

In December 2011, WADM dropped its classic country format in favor of jazz as WJZI ("Jazz in Indiana"). The new station played traditional jazz, as opposed to "smooth jazz". WJZI was the only full-time commercial jazz radio station in Indiana.

Lewis Broadcasting surrendered WJZI's license to the Federal Communications Commission on May 14, 2021, and it was cancelled on May 17.

== See also ==
- List of jazz radio stations in the United States
