= WRXS =

Radio station in Brookfield, Wisconsin

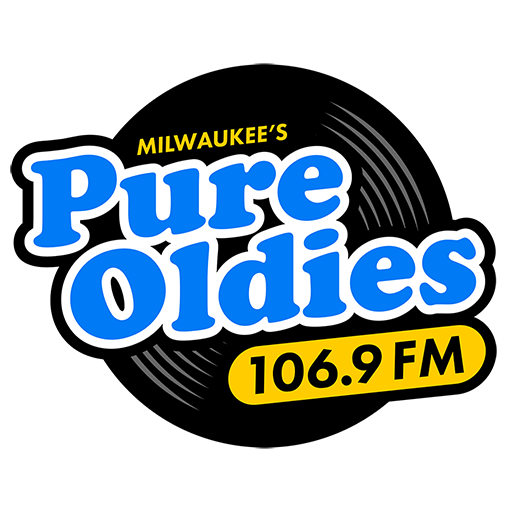
- Brookfield, Wisconsin; United States
- Broadcast area: Milwaukee metropolitan area
- Frequency: 106.9 MHz (HD Radio)
- Branding: Pure Oldies 106.9

Programming
- Format: Oldies

Ownership
- Owner: Saga Communications; (Lakefront Communications, LLC)
- Sister stations: WHQG; WJMR-FM; WJOI; WKLH

History
- First air date: August 1995; 30 years ago (as WFMI)
- Former call signs: WLJU (1993–1995, CP); WFMI (1995–1997); WXPT (1997); WPNT (1997–1999); WMJO (1999); WJMR (1999–2000); WFMR (2000–2007); WJZX (2007–2010); WNQW (2010); WZBK-FM (2010–2012); WNRG-FM (2012–2021)

Technical information
- Licensing authority: FCC
- Facility ID: 67484
- Class: A
- ERP: 4,400 watts
- HAAT: 116 meters (381 ft)
- Transmitter coordinates: 43.047°N 87.981°W

Links
- Public license information: Public file; LMS
- Webcast: Listen live
- Website: pureoldies1069.com

WRXS (106.9 FM; "Pure Oldies 106.9") is a commercial radio station licensed to Brookfield, Wisconsin, United States, and serving the Milwaukee metropolitan area. The station is owned by Saga Communications, and operates as part of its Milwaukee Radio Group. It broadcasts an oldies radio format, known as "Pure Oldies", concentrating on 1950s, 1960s and 1970s hits. It switches to Christmas music during the holiday season.

WRXS has an effective radiated power (ERP) of 4,400 watts. The transmitter and radio studios are on Milwaukee's West Side, off West McKinley Avenue.

== History ==
=== Smooth jazz (1995–1997) ===
On February 10, 1993, a construction permit was granted for a new FM station, with the call sign WLJU. The original permittee, Tran Broadcasting in Milwaukee sold it to Harris Classical Broadcasting, which also owned Milwaukee's heritage classical music station, WFMR, before it went on the air.

It formally signed on for the first time in August 1995, as WFMI, playing a satellite-fed smooth jazz format. A more powerful and resourceful station, WJZI, converted from a failing rock format as WQFM to smooth jazz in 1996, giving WFMI stiff competition.

=== Modern adult contemporary (1997–1999) ===
Both WFMR and WFMI were sold to Saga Communications, and WFMI was quickly switched to a modern AC format, becoming WXPT on May 9, 1997, branded as "106.9 The Point". The first song on "The Point" was Sheryl Crow's "A Change Would Do You Good". When WPNT-FM in Chicago changed format and call letters a few months later, 106.9 picked up the WPNT call sign. The Point had modest success for a small station, but a few of the bigger stations in the market took notice and adjusted their playlists to fight off the young suburban upstart.

The station is also hamstrung by a modest Class A signal which has never covered the important suburban communities like Waukesha and Ozaukee County very well, and is virtually non-existent north of the Sheboygan County line, where it runs into adjacent-channel interference from WHBZ on 106.5. This is because the frequency was a short-spacing allocation which is shared with WOOD-FM across Lake Michigan in Muskegon, Michigan a class B 50,000-watt operation that transmits in mono at its full power and is heard clearly in the cities along Wisconsin's lakeshore, overwhelming the Brookfield-licensed station's signal.

=== R&B oldies (1999–2000) ===
Again, due to stiff competition, the format was changed again at 3 p.m. on April 16, 1999, this time to urban oldies as "Jammin' 106.9", and the call letters became WMJO (which stood for "Milwaukee's Jammin' Oldies"). The call letters were changed a month later to WJMR and tag line to "Jammin' Hits" due to legal issues.

=== Classical (2000–2007) ===
Saga Communications moved WFMR and its classical music format to the 106.9 FM dial position, and WJMR-FM's format and call letters to 98.3, on December 12, 2000. This was done primarily to boost WJMR-FM's signal in the urban areas of Milwaukee, and to target WFMR toward the western and northern suburbs. Saga had moved the studios to Milwaukee the year before.

=== Smooth jazz (2007–2010) ===
At midnight on June 26, 2007, ironically on the 51st anniversary of its original sign-on, WFMR ended its classical music format when it flipped to the smooth jazz format, a change made quickly to gain momentum from rival WJZI, which dropped the format a week earlier to become light adult contemporary music as WLDB. On July 15, 2007, the station changed its call sign to WJZX.

On April 24, 2007, the FCC granted what was then WFMR a construction permit to move its transmitter from its original site in Menomonee Falls to the WJYI/WHQG/WJMR tower in Milwaukee outside of the stations' main studios on McKinley Avenue. However, because the station moved closer to Lake Michigan, the power was thus reduced in half from the Menomonee Falls signal to 4.4 kW in order to protect what was then WMUS (currently WOOD-FM) across the lake. The station's HD Radio signal was put into service in 2008, though because of the current limitations of digital radio the digital signal only covers the city of Milwaukee and eastern Waukesha County proper.

=== Aborted flip to top 40 (May-June 2010) ===
On May 27, 2010, at noon, after playing "Life in the Fast Lane" by Dave Koz, WJZX flipped from Broadcast Architecture's syndicated satellite feed smooth adult contemporary "Smooth Jazz Network" to a stunt format called "Tiger 106.9", which referenced Tiger Woods's scandals and featured cheating-themed music from all eras. Saga had reserved the call letters WNQW, possibly referring to the then-popular "Now" format of top 40 music and announced them publicly in the media, which proved problematic overall in hindsight due to what would occur the next day. The format change was likely done due to the introduction of Arbitron's Portable People Meter audience measurement system in the month of June into the Milwaukee market.

BA's smooth/urban AC format remained for a period of time without local broadcasters on 106.9's HD2 subchannel, which has since been replaced with an HD relay of sister AM station WJOI, which has a Christian/brokered programming format. Internet listeners were referred to the live stream of Saga sister station WJZA in Columbus, Ohio, which featured the same basic format and playlist structuring as the former WJZX. (However, WJZA has since also changed format to classic hits).

The next day, at 9 a.m., the 1970s/1980s rock station WQBW, owned by Clear Channel Communications, flipped to top 40 as "97.3 Radio Now". This was likely done to block Saga's attempt to brand 106.9 with the new WNQW calls as "106.9 Now". The WNQW call sign was registered with the FCC on May 21. Clear Channel appeared ready to reformat "The Brew" even before WJZX's stunting, and put it into place earlier than expected to claim the "Now" brand before 106.9 had the opportunity. WQBW took the calls WRNW on June 10.

The "Tiger Radio" stunt carried over into May 29 before a switch to songs featuring the word "America" in the title throughout the remainder of the Memorial Day holiday weekend. Saga also could not cancel the WNQW calls, which were implemented as scheduled on May 28, so it retained those calls until it filed for a new set.

The station switched to another stunt format on June 2, playing The Beatles' entire catalog in alphabetical order. The catalog looped several times through the next few days.

=== Country (2010–2012) ===
On June 7, 2010, at 3 p.m., after the Beatles stunt ended with "Ob-La-Di, Ob-La-Da", 106.9 finally debuted their new permanent format: classic country, branded as "Big Buck Country 106.9". The station focused on country music from the late 1970s through early 1990s, and debuted with the Alan Jackson hit "Gone Country". It put 106.9 in direct competition with AM Clear Channel operation WOKY (920), Clear Channel station WMIL-FM (106.1), and West Bend's WBWI-FM (92.5), which has most of its audience in Milwaukee's northern suburbs. The call letters WZBK-FM became effective June 15, 2010, calls already in use by a sister AM operation in Keene, New Hampshire. As expected with the overall botched launch, the station had little overall impact in the Milwaukee ratings.

=== Top 40 (2012–2021) ===
On September 7, 2012, at 10 a.m., after playing "What Might Have Been" by Little Texas and the first minute and a half of "The Thunder Rolls" by Garth Brooks (which began repeating on the line "When the thunder rolls/and the lightning strikes"... before grinding to a halt that led into energizing sound effects featuring thunder and lightning), WZBK-FM finally flipped to rhythmic top 40, branded as "Energy 106.9". "Energy" launched with "Party Rock Anthem" by LMFAO. In a statement from general manager Annmarie Topel, the station's format would be similar to a contemporary-hits format, but with "no bubble-gum pop", and added that "As the (rhythmic CHR) format evolves, there are great opportunities for stations that are newer, faster, cleaner and leaner". On September 12, the call letters were changed to WNRG-FM. (Despite this, WNRG-FM continued using the WZBK-FM legal ID liners for two more days). In its first 30 days, WNRG-FM was commercial free and promised to play 10,069 songs until October 8, when it added commercials and began promising to play 60 minutes of music per hour on air.

The flip to rhythmic also brought the format back to Milwaukee for the first time since October 1994, when WLUM carried the format before they flipped to alternative, which at the time was due to owner Willie Davis' decision to move the station away from playing the increasing hip-hop content that he felt was too offensive. Like WLUM (during its later years), WNRG-FM's rhythmic playlist heavily focused on rhythmic pop/dance currents, but would also incorporate more R&B/hip-hop into the music mix. As such, WNRG-FM faced competition from top 40/CHR rival WXSS, and from urban contemporary rival WKKV.

WNRG-FM was also the first station in the Saga Communications rhythmic top 40 line up to be launched on a full-powered signal, as their two other outlets in Des Moines (HITS99.9 K260AM/KIOA) and Champaign (HITS99.7 WIXY-HD3/W259BG) broadcast on simulcasting HD radio subchannels and FM translators. They also share the same fonts and logos except for the branding (Des Moines and Champaign's monikers are "Hits"). The WNRG-FM voiceover imaging and liners were handled by Scott Matthews and Wendy K. Gray of CESD Talent. All three stations were programmed in Milwaukee by Saga/Milwaukee PD Brandon Rowe up until his departure in May 2013.

On January 25, 2013, after running jockless for four months, WNRG-FM hired its first airstaffer, Jeremy "Cousin Ed" Schultz, for afternoons, while Rowe took the 7 pm-midnight slot until his exit from the station. They also added DJ Ekin for mix shows duties, airing at 6 pm and 10 pm daily. WNRG-FM began adding an airstaffer for the midday slot with the hiring of Taylor Vaughn in October 2013. Taylor left in January 2014, and was replaced by Ashley Z (who has also since left the station; Mandy Scott replaced her afterwards).

While "Energy" was able to retain strong enough ratings to last eight years, it failed to overtake WXSS or WKKV, in large part due to its relatively weak signal. The last Nielsen Audio ratings under the format, the February 2021 ratings, saw WNRG-FM carry a 1.5 share, significantly trailing WXSS, which had a 4.2 share.

=== Oldies (2021–present) ===
On March 30, 2021, the station would dismiss the entirety of their airstaff, and briefly run jockless. At noon the same day, WNRG-FM dropped the "Energy" format and began stunting with light instrumental and big band covers of popular songs, while a female computerized voice periodically counted down to April 1, at 10:06 a.m., at which time the station, under new callsign WRXS, flipped to oldies as "Pure Oldies 106.9". The first song on "Pure Oldies" was "Chain of Fools" by Aretha Franklin.

== See also ==
- WKLH
- WJMR-FM
- WFMR (defunct)
