= WJOI =

Radio station in Milwaukee

- Milwaukee, Wisconsin; United States
- Broadcast area: Milwaukee metropolitan area
- Frequency: 1340 kHz
- Branding: Joy 1340 AM 98.7 FM

Programming
- Format: Christian talk and teaching
- Affiliations: Salem Radio Network (Today's Christian Music)

Ownership
- Owner: Saga Communications; (Lakefront Communications, LLC)
- Sister stations: WHQG; WJMR-FM; WKLH; WRXS

History
- First air date: October 14, 1935 (as WEMP)
- Former call signs: WEMP (1935–1955); WRIT (1955–1978); WBCS (1978–1980); WMKE (1980–1984); WBCS (1984–1987); WLZR (1987–1997); WJYI (1997–2021)
- Former frequencies: 1310 kHz (1935–1941)
- Call sign meaning: Similar to "joy"

Technical information
- Licensing authority: FCC
- Facility ID: 36371
- Class: C
- Power: 1,000 watts
- Transmitter coordinates: 43°2′49.05″N 87°58′52.31″W
- Translator: 98.7 W254CU (Milwaukee)
- Repeater: 102.9 WHQG-HD2 (Milwaukee)

Links
- Public license information: Public file; LMS
- Webcast: Listen live
- Website: www.joy1340.com

WJOI (1340 AM) is a commercial radio station in Milwaukee, Wisconsin, United States. WJOI is owned by Saga Communications, and operates as part of its Milwaukee Radio Group, with radio studios and offices on Milwaukee's West Side. The transmitter is on West Martin Drive in Milwaukee. Programming is also heard on 99-watt FM translator W254CU at 98.7 MHz.

WJOI has a Christian talk and teaching radio format most of the day. On weekdays it largely broadcasts national religious leaders including Chuck Swindoll, David Jeremiah, Joyce Meyer, Jim Daly and Alistair Begg. Some hours of the night and weekends, WJOI carries "Today's Christian Music" from the Salem Radio Network. Sunday hours also include brokered ethnic programming, largely German Polish, including Polka music. The station also airs Slovene and Croatian programming.

== History ==
The station signed on the air as WEMP on October 14, 1935. WEMP was Milwaukee's third radio station (after WISN and WTMJ). At first, it broadcast on 1310 kHz. It was a 100-watt daytimer, required to go off the air at night. It was owned by the Milwaukee Broadcasting Company, with studios in the Empire Building.

When the North American Regional Broadcasting Agreement (NARBA) was enacted in 1941, the station moved to 1340 AM. It became a Class IV station, permitted to broadcast at 250 watts, day and night. In June 1943, WEMP became the first radio station in Milwaukee to broadcast a 24-hour schedule. It carried various ethnic programs and sports broadcasts, including Marquette University basketball and the Milwaukee Brewers. WEMP was an affiliate of the NBC Blue Network, which later became the ABC Radio Network.

In 1955, WEMP moved to a stronger signal on 1250 AM. The new owners of 1340 kHz changed the call sign to WRIT (for "We're It"), and launched a Top 40 format. Future television talk show host Tom Snyder got his start at the station as a news reporter in the 1950s.

WRIT switched to all-news on September 29, 1975, with NBC's News and Information Service (NIS). The all-news format was unsuccessful and within a couple of years NBC ended the all-news network. The station dropped the WRIT call sign in 1978, picking up the call sign WBCS. It stood for "Wisconsin's Best Country Station", as AM 1340 began simulcasting the country music format of its co-owned FM sister station at 102.9 MHz. The WRIT call sign was resurrected on New Year's Day 2000, by oldies-formatted WZTR as a tribute to the former Top 40 era of the old WRIT.

AM 1340 became WMKE in 1980, programming its own classic country format, then switched back to a simulcast of WBCS-FM. In 1983 the calls were again changed to WMKE and the station aired a gold-based adult contemporary format, before going back to WBCS a third time in 1984, again simulcasting the FM sister station. The station briefly aired an all-talk format in 1985, before going back to simulcasting WBCS-FM.

When WBCS-FM flipped to AOR as WLZR-FM in 1987, the AM station also became WLZR, simulcasting the album rock format for several years. In the early 1990s, WLZR aired its own automated formats, first heavy metal as "The Crusher", then an alternative rock format known as "The Warp" until 1994, when it again reverted to a full-time simulcast of WLZR-FM.

Eventually, the station began to sell much of its air time to religious and sports broadcasters, and became WJYI (Joy 1340) on May 30, 1997.

In early 2011, WJYI began simulcasting on the HD Radio digital subchannel of sister station WZBK-FM, replacing the previous automated smooth jazz format which aired on that subchannel in the aftermath of the May 2010 WJZX format switch. WJYI later moved its simulcast to WJMR-FM HD2 and then to WHQG-HD2.

On May 8, 2016, WJYI launched FM translator 98.7 W254CU and rebranded as "Joy 1340 AM/98.7 FM". The station swapped its call letters with co-owned WJOI in Norfolk, Virginia on April 29, 2021 to preserve the WJOI calls after the Norfolk station was taken silent the next day and its license returned for cancellation.

== Translator ==
Call sign	Frequency	City of license	FID	ERP (W)	Class	Transmitter coordinates	FCC info
W254CU	98.7 FM	Milwaukee, Wisconsin	144413	99	D	43°2′49″N 87°58′52.3″W	LMS
