= WLDB =

Radio station in Mukwonago, Wisconsin

- Mukwonago, Wisconsin; United States
- Broadcast area: Greater Milwaukee
- Frequency: 105.3 MHz

Programming
- Format: Worship music
- Network: Air1

Ownership
- Owner: Educational Media Foundation; (K-LOVE, Inc)
- Sister stations: WLUM, WLVE

History
- First air date: November 22, 2001
- Former call signs: WFZH (2001–2008); WKMZ (2008–2011); WLVE (2011–2026)

Technical information
- Licensing authority: FCC
- Facility ID: 88081
- Class: A
- ERP: 1,650 watts
- HAAT: 193 meters (633 ft)
- Transmitter coordinates: 42.968°N 88.189°W
- Repeater: 102.1 WLUM-FM (Milwaukee)

Links
- Public license information: Public file; LMS
- Website: www.air1.com

WLDB (105.3 MHz) is a non-commercial radio station licensed to Mukwonago, Wisconsin, and serving the Greater Milwaukee radio market. The station is owned by the Educational Media Foundation, a non-profit organization based in Franklin, Tennessee, carrying EMF's secondary network of worship music, Air1 in a simulcast with sister station WLUM (102.1), with WLVE (93.3) now serving as the market's K-Love station after WLDB broadcast the network for over fourteen years.

WLDB's transmitter is situated off Beeheim Road in Waukesha.

== History ==
The station signed on the air on November 22, 2001, as WFZH, carrying a Christmas music format. Just after Christmas, the station switched to contemporary Christian music (CCM) as "105.3 The Fish". WFZH was owned by Salem Communications, the largest Christian broadcaster in the United States. It shared studio space and staff with its sister station, 540 WRRD, a Christian talk and teaching outlet.

Danny Clayton was hired as the first (and only) program director for WFZH, having previously spent his Milwaukee radio career at adult contemporary-formatted WKTI. Other original staff members included Milwaukee radio veteran Andi Miller. Personalities who later joined "The Fish" included Jon Hemmer and Rick Hall.

For a time, WFZH had a friendly rivalry with co-owned WZFS in Chicago, which included a paintball game between the stations' employees. This rivalry lasted until the Chicago station was sold to Univision Communications in 2005 and WZFS became Spanish language AC station WPPN.

In February 2008, Salem sold WFZH and WRRD in separate deals. WRRD was purchased by Good Karma Broadcasting, which moved the all-sports format of WAUK (1510 AM) to 540 as WAUK. WFZH was sold to the Educational Media Foundation for $8 million; it remained a contemporary Christian music station, but switched from local programming to EMF's K-Love national network. This took effect after midnight on February 15, 2008, following two days of on-air farewells from the "Fish" staff. On May 30, the call letters changed to WKMZ. On April 29, 2011, WKMZ changed its call sign to WLVE to go with the "K-Love" branding.

After EMF's takeover (and proposed sale) of WLDB (93.3) and WLUM-FM (102.1, both licensed to Milwaukee) was completed at the end of October 2025, WLVE switched to Air1 in a simulcast with WLUM-FM, and WLDB assuming the K-Love schedule as the latter's signal is in the central portion of the market.

On February 5, 2026, WLDB and WLVE swapped call signs.
