= WAWA (AM) =

- West Allis, Wisconsin; United States
- Broadcast area: Milwaukee, Wisconsin
- Frequency: 1590 kHz

Programming
- Format: Defunct (was R&B)

History
- First air date: October 1961
- Last air date: 1988
- Former call signs: WLUM
- Call sign meaning: West Allis Wisconsin AM

Technical information
- Power: 1,000 watts (daytime only)

WAWA was a radio station licensed to West Allis, Wisconsin, serving the Milwaukee area, transmitting on 1590 kHz. Its studio and transmitter were located in Elm Grove. For the station's entire existence, WAWA was the sister station to WAWA-FM (later WLUM-FM).

The station signed on the air in 1961, and signed off in 1988, when the owner returned the license to the FCC. Since the FCC no longer re-licenses daytime-only stations, the 1590 AM frequency allocation in the Milwaukee market is considered to be permanently deleted.

== History ==
Originally airing an adult standards format, WAWA quickly found success playing rhythm and blues music, starting in 1963. The format was popular with Milwaukee's African-American community, and was a serious rival to WNOV during the 1960s, 1970s and 1980s. They also simulcast part-time with their FM sister station on 102.1 MHz, and beginning on October 1, 1987, 1590 changed callsigns to WLUM, with their sister station which had switched from WAWA-FM in February 1979. All-Pro Broadcasting purchased both stations in from Suburbanaire Inc, in 1979. In 1988, they were able to buy a 24 hour station on 1290 kHz. Since FCC rules at the time would not allow them to keep both AM stations, and because they were unable to sell WLUM (AM), they signed 1590 AM off the air for good and returned the station's license to the FCC. 1590's format and programming were subsequently moved to 1290 AM.
