= WXSS =

- Wauwatosa, Wisconsin; United States
- Broadcast area: Greater Milwaukee
- Frequency: 103.7 MHz (HD Radio)
- Branding: 103.7 Kiss-FM

Programming
- Format: Top 40
- Subchannels: HD2: WSSP simulcast (Sports radio); HD3: "Channel Q" LGBTQ dance music
- Affiliations: American Top 40 (Sunday mornings)

Ownership
- Owner: Audacy, Inc.; (Audacy License, LLC)
- Sister stations: WMYX-FM; WSSP

History
- First air date: January 1, 1961; 65 years ago
- Former call signs: WTOS (1961–71); WEZW (1971–95); WAMG (1995–98)
- Call sign meaning: X represents a kiss, then the "SS" in kiss

Technical information
- Licensing authority: FCC
- Facility ID: 27031
- Class: B
- ERP: 19,500 watts
- HAAT: 257 meters (843 ft)
- Transmitter coordinates: 43.097°N 87.905°W
- Translator: HD2: 105.7 W289CB (Milwaukee)

Links
- Public license information: Public file; LMS
- Webcast: Listen live (via Audacy)
- Website: www.audacy.com/1037kissfm

WXSS (103.7 FM) is a commercial radio station licensed to Wauwatosa, Wisconsin United States, and serving Greater Milwaukee and Southeast Wisconsin. It broadcasts a contemporary hit radio format and is owned by Audacy, Inc. Its studios are on West Grange Avenue in Hales Corners.

WXSS is a Class B FM station, with an effective radiated power (ERP) of 18,000 watts. The transmitter is on North Humboldt Boulevard in the Milwaukee "tower farm" complex near Estabrook Park and the Milwaukee River in the northeastern part of the city. WXSS broadcasts using HD Radio technology. Its digital subchannels carry a simulcast of sister station WSSP on HD2, and "Channel Q", Audacy's LGBTQ and dance music service, on HD3. The HD2 subchannel feeds FM translator W289CB at 105.7 MHz.

== History ==
=== Early years (1961–1971) ===
The original call sign was WTOS, a reference to its city of license when it signed on in 1961 with a MOR format. WTOS later flipped to a country music format that also featured ethnic programming. In March 1969, new owners switched the station's format to progressive rock, going head-to-head with WZMF.

=== Beautiful music (1971–1993) ===
The limited signal at the time and inexperienced owners lost money with the station, and in 1971, WTOS was sold to Sudbrink Broadcasting, who increased the power and adopted a beautiful music format with the WEZW call sign. WEZW was a huge ratings success for the following two decades.

=== Adult contemporary (1993–1995) ===
Previous logo from the mid-1990s as WAMG

As the format withered away on radio dials across the country during the late 1980s and early 1990s, WEZW tweaked the format in 1993 by adding adult contemporary music with vocals. WEZW made an even more abrupt change in March 1995 by changing its calls to WAMG and branding to Magic 103.7 with the slogan "Continuous Soft Favorites".

=== Rhythmic adult contemporary (1996–1998) ===
Unable to compete with WLTQ, they flipped to a Rhythmic Adult Contemporary format during Labor Day weekend in 1996, keeping the "Magic" branding, but changing the slogan to "Rhythm & Romance." The playlist featured rhythmic oldies, current R&B and Pop/Dance in addition to soft AC. Much of the airstaff was changed; however, some features including "Lovesongs" (with a different host) and "The Sunday Jazz Brunch" remained.

=== Top 40 (1998–present) ===
On June 19, 1998, WAMG flipped to the current Top 40/CHR format as "103.7 Kiss FM", and changed call letters to WXSS. The first song on "Kiss" was "Everybody" by Backstreet Boys. The flip brought the format back to the Milwaukee market for the first time since WLUM-FM dropped it for alternative in 1994. The station debuted with 10,000 songs in a row without commercials, as many CHR stations have done, and was promoted and followed by a $10,000 giveaway. The current Vice President of Operations, Brian Kelly, was in charge of the launch, which included imaging by Mitch Craig. The station was branded as The All New, All Hit 103.7 Kiss FM from the time it started until February 2003.

In February 2003, the station tweaked its playlist to Rhythmic CHR and branding to 103.7 Kiss FM, The New #1 Hit Music Station; by August 2003, the station switched back to mainstream CHR. However, by 2009, WXSS shifted again to a Rhythmic-leaning direction with a heavy emphasis on R&B/hip-hop, dance and pop hits, while playing only the most popular rock music.

WXSS received new competition in May 2010, when WRNW ditched its '80s-based classic rock format to go Top 40/CHR. WRNW's parent company iHeartMedia (the former Clear Channel Communications) owns the rights to the "Kiss FM" branding, though when WXSS launched in 1998, Clear Channel was still in the process of acquiring their Milwaukee stations, and the strategy of expanding the Kiss FM branding across Clear Channel's stations nationwide had not yet been implemented, allowing Entercom to claim the name in the Milwaukee market. WRNW would flip to sports talk in November 2018 after eight years and not-so-impressive ratings.

In September 2012, WXSS picked up new competition from WZBK-FM, who switched formats from classic country to rhythmic Top 40 as WNRG. The competition lasted until April 2021, when the station flipped to oldies, thus leaving WXSS as the only CHR station in Milwaukee.

Following changes to Audacy-owned stations nation-wide in July 2021, all local DJs outside of the morning show were replaced with syndicated personalities from other markets.

== Past personalities on KISS FM ==
=== Mornings ===
The Joe Show with Joe Caruso, Van "The Man" McNeal, and Ginger Jordan was the first morning show when the station signed on. The show later was helmed for a short time by Van and Ginger, after the departure of Caruso. Former KDWB afternoon jock Michael Knight then joined to form Knight In The Morning. Later, Van moved to nights on KISS and Michael and Ginger welcomed former KDWB production director Rahny Taylor as the third host and executive producer. Later, when Rahny and Michael were moved to clustermate Hot A/C WMYX and Ginger departed the station, KISS mornings were handled again by Van McNeal, this time with KISS production assistant Tony Zamboni as co-host. Just months later, Van moved to afternoon drive on KISS and Rahny Taylor returned to KISS FM, along with former KISS night and afternoon host Wes McKane, to form the "Wes & Rahny In The Morning". Later, former WIFC FM night jock Alley Faith joined Wes and Rahny, to form "Wes, Rahny, and Alley". In 2013 Rahny departed the station for K-Love/Air1 in Sacramento. Crosstown WRNW afternoon host, Riggs, replaced him to form "Wes, Riggs & Alley." In late 2015, Wes left Kiss to host mornings on sister station, WMYX. In September 2016, Ryan Gibbons joined the show from KZOK Seattle as full-time "Producer Gibbons". The show was then known as simply "Riggs and Alley". In October 2022, Riggs announced plans to depart the station.

=== Middays ===
JoJo Martinez held the midday position for about nine of those years. During JoJo's short time away from the station, former Atlanta radio personality and current XM disc jockey PJ held the job. JoJo moved to sister station WMYX in the summer of 2010 and Leigh McNabb, formerly of WLRW, WZOK and WMYX, hosted middays until 2015. In the fall of 2015, current music director, Nathan Graham began hosting middays. In 2018, JMatt became the station's midday host. In 2021, the out-of-market personality Julia began airing in middays. In 2025, Julia was removed from the on-air lineup with no replacement.

=== Afternoons ===
The station signed on with former Jacksonville and Denver radio personality Greg Tanner in afternoons. Following his exit, former KISS night jock and current morning host Wes McKane held down PM drive. After Wes left to do nights at KDWB in the Twin Cities, Mat Mitchell, formerly nights at Mix 93.3 in Kansas City, held down afternoons. When Mat left to do mornings at Channel 963 in Wichita, then night host Van McNeal did afternoons. Van later left to do the same shift on sister station WMYX, which opened the door for Kraig Karson, the station's first night host, to do afternoons. In 2022, the out-of-market personality Josh "Bru" Brubaker began airing in afternoons.

=== Nights ===
When KISS signed on, current afternoon jock Kraig Karson served as the first night show host. When Kraig left for afternoons at the now defunct 103.5 The Beat in Chicago, current morning show host Wes McKane became the station's second night jock, coming from a similar role at 95.5 WIFC FM in central Wisconsin. After Wes moved to afternoons, former KDWB jock Zanny K. enter for a very short stint as the night time host. Zanny was followed by Van McNeal, who shifted into nights from mornings. Van's move back to mornings made way for B-Dub, who was inbound from HOT 104 in Mobile, AL. After about one year, B-Dub left for afternoon drive at Q102 in Philly and was replaced by Kracker, a.k.a. Pat Clark, who moved from a similar job at U92 in Salt Lake City. Upon Kracker's departure for mornings in Seattle at KQMV, former KISS part-timer Brett Andrews returned for the night slot, coming from HOT 97 in Las Vegas, where he hosted afternoons. Brett Andrews was the night host until May 2010, when he took another job in Portland, Oregon. After his move, HaZe, who formerly worked at KSLZ St. Louis, took over the night slot at KISS. After Haze left the station in 2011, Michelle McKnight stepped in. She left the station in the spring of 2014 for KTFM in San Antonio. Nathan Graham came to KISS to host nights in the fall of 2014. After segueing up to middays, he was replaced by longtime Milwaukee radio staple, DJ Gee-A. In 2022, the out-of-market personality Sean "Sonic" Leake began airing in evenings.

=== Overnights ===
Current overnight host is Z, who also works as Assistant Production Director for Entercom Milwaukee. Previous overnight hosts included Dave Michaels (Currently nights on WRIT-FM), Brett Andrews did fill in overnights in 2002 (Currently Program Director and Morning Show host at WRIT-FM), Jake Evans (Left for WLUM-FM in 2002)

=== Klub KISS ===
Klub KISS, created in 2003, is a dance club mixshow featuring most of the songs played in regular rotation in remixed/dance mix form. It was so popular that in 2005 it spawned the 5 O'Clock Traffic Jam and PJ's Party Jam (later renamed Jojo's Party Jam upon Jojo's return to the Midday slot).

Klub KISS is currently produced and hosted by night personality, DJ Gee-A.

== HD Radio ==
The station has two HD Radio subchannels. When WXSS commenced HD operations, their HD2 sub-channel carried the standup comedy format of the All Comedy Radio Network. Later, an HD3 subchannel was activated to simulcasts sister sports talk station WSSP. In August 2011, the WSSP simulcast moved to the HD2, replacing the All Comedy Radio Network, and the HD3 subchannel was turned off. As of June 2014, the 103.7-HD2 signal was translated in analog form on 105.7 FM over translator W289CB to give WSSP an FM signal within the main Milwaukee area.

In the spring of 2019, WXSS-HD3 was launched to carry "The Oasis", an '80s-heavy adult contemporary playlist branded as "Relaxing Radio"; in mid-August 2019, it was switched to the LGBTQ+ network Channel Q.

On October 5, 2020, WXSS-HD2/W289CB dropped the simulcast of WSSP and flipped to urban contemporary, branded as "Hot 105.7". The shift in format was likely intended to lure in nostalgia listeners, when WLUM-FM utilized the same format under the branding of "Hot 102" from its 1979 launch until its 1994 transition to rock and alternative music (though the current incarnation of "Hot" has a more modern playlist), along with providing direct competition to WKKV, albeit in an automated form to start. The "Hot" format was dropped in October 2024, as W289CB returned to simulcasting WSSP.
