= Greg Tanner =

British television producer and media executive

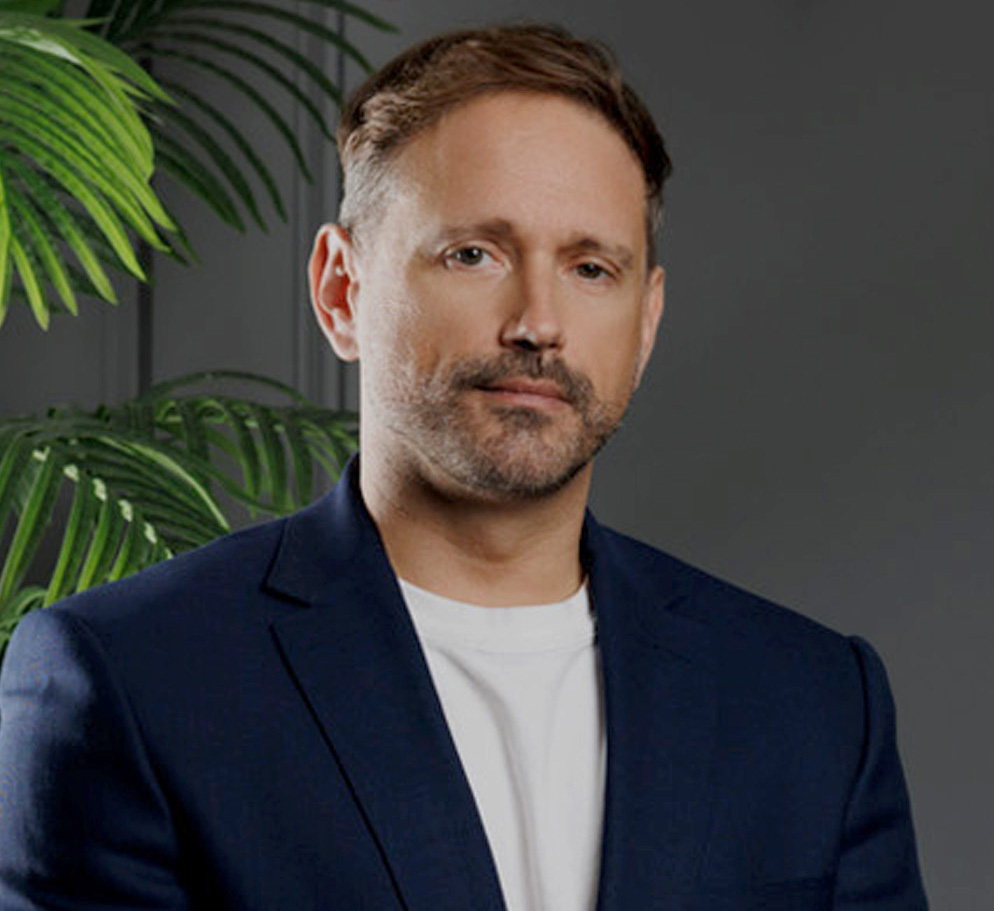
Greg Tanner

Greg Tanner is a British television producer and media executive based in Dubai, United Arab Emirates. He has worked in broadcast journalism and digital media, with a focus on financial news, multimedia production and content strategy.

Tanner spent nine years at Bloomberg, including a period in Dubai as an executive producer for the organisation’s Middle East and Africa television output. In 2024, he joined The National as multimedia editor.

== Career ==
=== Early career ===
Tanner began his career in the United Kingdom, working across news, sports and entertainment projects. He was involved in the development of Streetball.co.uk, a basketball website and community focused on British and international streetball culture.

In 2010, he was identified as the editor of MVP, a quarterly basketball magazine launched in the United Kingdom.

=== Broadcast journalism ===
Tanner worked with UK broadcasters including ITV News and Sky News in production roles across live news and current affairs programming.

In 2015, he joined Bloomberg in London as a senior producer, working on markets programming including The Pulse and Leaders with Lacqua.

=== Bloomberg ===
In 2017, Tanner relocated to Dubai as an executive producer for Bloomberg’s Middle East and Africa television operation. According to InPublishing, he had previously served as Bloomberg’s team leader and executive producer for the Middle East and Africa, focusing on stories and events from across the region.

He also appeared in Bloomberg video coverage, including a 2021 segment on the UAE topping Bloomberg’s Covid Resilience Ranking.

=== The National ===
In 2024, Tanner joined The National as multimedia editor, leading video and podcast production in Abu Dhabi and across the publication’s bureaux.

He later contributed reporting and video coverage for the publication, including UAE news and sports stories.

=== Later work ===
Following his staff newsroom roles, Tanner worked independently in media and communications, advising organisations and senior executives on media engagement, video communications and content strategy.

He has also written on media and communications topics, including an opinion article for PRmoment MENA on media training in financial public relations.

== Personal life ==
Tanner is based in Dubai.
