= WHQG =

Radio station in Milwaukee

- Milwaukee, Wisconsin; United States
- Broadcast area: Milwaukee metropolitan area
- Frequency: 102.9 MHz (HD Radio)
- Branding: 102.9 The Hog

Programming
- Format: Mainstream rock
- Subchannels: HD2: WJOI simulcast (Brokered Christian)
- Affiliations: Compass Media Networks; United Stations Radio Networks

Ownership
- Owner: Saga Communications; (Lakefront Communications, LLC)
- Sister stations: WJMR-FM; WJOI; WKLH; WRXS

History
- First air date: April 22, 1962
- Former call signs: WRIT-FM (1962–1971); WFWO (1971–1972); WBCS-FM (1972–1987); WLZR-FM (1987–2005)
- Call sign meaning: "Hog"

Technical information
- Licensing authority: FCC
- Facility ID: 36372
- Class: B
- ERP: 50,000 watts
- HAAT: 130 meters (430 ft)
- Transmitter coordinates: 43.047°N 87.981°W

Links
- Public license information: Public file; LMS
- Webcast: Listen live
- Website: www.1029thehog.com

WHQG (102.9 FM, "102.9 The Hog") is a commercial radio station in Milwaukee, Wisconsin, United States. It airs a mainstream rock radio format and is owned by Saga Communications, operating as part of its Milwaukee Radio Group.

WHQG is a Class B FM station, with an effective radiated power (ERP) of 50,000 watts, the maximum for most Milwaukee-area stations. The studios, which are shared with WHQG's four sister stations, along with the transmitter tower, are on West McKinley Avenue, on the city's west side.

== History ==
=== Top 40 and soft AC (1962–1972) ===
The station signed on the air on April 22, 1962, as WRIT-FM, co-owned with WRIT (1340 AM, now WJOI). The stations simulcasted a Top 40 format.

In 1971, 102.9 split from the simulcast, becoming WFWO-FM ("For Women Only"). WFWO played soft adult contemporary music.

=== Country (1972–1987) ===
The station flipped to country music as WBCS on October 1, 1972. WBCS found success with the format, as they were the only FM country station in the market at the time. In 1983, WMIL-FM (106.1 FM) launched a country format, putting WMIL and WBCS in competition for Milwaukee country music fans.

=== Mainstream rock (1987–2005) ===
WLZR succeeded WBCS with a hard rock format on February 16, 1987. "Lazer 103" dominated the album-oriented rock market, such that competing station WQFM switched to smooth jazz in 1996. WLZR's longtime morning show of Bob and Brian debuted in July 1987. The station ran a simulcast on sister station 1340 AM beginning in the WBCS era, sporadically until 1997, when 1340 AM became the faith-based WJYI.

Even with Bob and Brian's success, during Lazer 103's last few years, the aging audience of the station's morning show did not translate to listenership of the station's younger-skewing active rock format the rest of the day, as older listeners dispersed to the more work-appropriate offerings of sister station WKLH, or WKTI and other offerings after the show's end. Also in 2004, WLTQ suddenly dropped their light adult contemporary format and switched to an 1980s-oriented classic rock format as "97.3 The Brew", which also stripped listeners of WLZR post-Bob and Brian, along with WKLH. Management decided to rebuild the station around the demographic of their popular morning show, along with the general decline in the active rock format altogether at the time.

=== Classic rock (2005–present) ===
On August 15, 2005, WLZR started stunting with wide-ranging music and teasers. The stunt also included songs with the word "Jack" in their title (in reference to the rapidly growing Jack FM format). The next day, just after 10:00 a.m., Bob and Brian signed off their morning show by signing on a new radio station -- "102-9 The Hog". The station re-imaged itself, dropped much of the younger-skewing rock music from bands like Slipknot, Mudvayne and Linkin Park, added more rock from the 1960s, 1970s and 1980s, and widely expanded their playlist. The new slogan was "Everything That Rocks", and serves as a harder rocking counterpart to its classic rock sister, WKLH. Another slogan used to help change the station's image and to steal listeners from other stations included "Not Just the 80's, Everything That Rocks". The results of the image and playlist changes were immediate, as "The Hog" soon eclipsed "The Brew" in the local ratings, eventually hastening their May 2010 conversion to Top 40 as WRNW.

The Hog's mascot hog was named "Dr. Squealgood" in a contest which is takeoff of the popular Mötley Crüe song "Dr. Feelgood". The Hog branding's success has led to Janesville, Wisconsin station WWHG changing its branding to mirror WHQG's.

In recent years, WHQG's format shifted back towards active rock, similar to the former WLZR.
