= WJMR-FM =

Radio station in Menomonee Falls, Wisconsin

- Menomonee Falls, Wisconsin; United States
- Broadcast area: Milwaukee metropolitan area
- Frequency: 98.3 MHz (HD Radio)
- Branding: Jammin' 98.3

Programming
- Format: Urban adult contemporary
- Affiliations: Compass Media Networks; Premiere Networks; United Stations Radio Networks

Ownership
- Owner: Saga Communications; (Lakefront Communications, LLC)
- Sister stations: WHQG; WJOI; WKLH; WRXS

History
- First air date: July 30, 1966 (as WZMF)
- Former call signs: WZMF (1966–1979); WXJY (1979–1983); WFMR (1983–2000)
- Call sign meaning: "Jammin' R&B"

Technical information
- Licensing authority: FCC
- Facility ID: 26222
- Class: A
- ERP: 4,900 watts
- HAAT: 111 meters (364 ft)
- Transmitter coordinates: 43.047°N 87.981°W

Links
- Public license information: Public file; LMS
- Webcast: Listen live
- Website: jammin983.com

WJMR-FM (98.3 MHz, "Jammin' 98.3") is an urban adult contemporary radio station licensed to Menomonee Falls, Wisconsin, United States, serving the Milwaukee metropolitan area. Owned by Saga Communications, its studios (which are shared with the other four stations in Saga's Milwaukee Radio Group) and transmitter are located in Milwaukee's West Side.

== History ==
=== 98.3 FM history ===
The 98.3 frequency was home for many years to WZMF, which signed on the air in July 1966. At its inception, the station aired a MOR format. WZMF was located in a small house on Shady Lane in Menomonee Falls.

WZMF's pop music programming eventually became more experimental, and the station evolved into a freeform progressive rock format by October 1968, one of the first stations to do so in the midwest. The station was moderately successful with the format for the next eleven years. In 1971, rival WTOS was sold to Sudbrink Broadcasting and abandoned Progressive Rock for Beautiful Music. WZMF then was competitive with leading rocker WQFM. When WISN-FM switched from beautiful music to rock as WLPX in 1978, immediately becoming a ratings success, WZMF began to tighten their format, amid protests from the station's on-air staff, and ratings dropped.

WZMF went silent on March 23, 1979, after playing its last three songs: "Not to Touch the Earth" by The Doors, "American Pie" by Don McLean, and the National Anthem by Jimi Hendrix. The station was then sold to Goetz Broadcasting, and returned to the air in May 1979 with an easy listening format as WXJY (Joy FM 98). In 1983, it became home to WFMR and its classical music format.

=== WJMR-FM history ===
WJMR started out on 106.9 FM as WMJO, playing a Jammin' Oldies format. Chancellor Broadcasting owned the trademark for the phrase "Jammin' Oldies", so the station was referred to as "Jammin' Hits" and the call letters (which stood for "Milwaukee's Jammin' Oldies") were changed to WJMR, and the station was known as "Jammin' 106.9".

The station stayed at 106.9 FM until December 12, 2000, when current owner Saga Communications moved WJMR's format and call letters to 98.3 in a swap with WFMR. This was done primarily to put WJMR's on a signal that more effectively covered the urban areas of Milwaukee, and to target WFMR toward the western and northern suburbs. Soon after WJMR moved to 98.3, the "Jammin' Oldies" trend was winding down, and the station tweaked its format to urban adult contemporary, a format it retains to this day. The station still refers to itself as "Jammin' 98.3", and has had success with its format since moving to the new frequency. The station is a probable rival to WKKV-FM, though the station's focus on an older audience and type of music means their formats rarely clash.
