= WRJN =

Radio station in Racine, Wisconsin

- Racine, Wisconsin; United States
- Broadcast area: Racine and Kenosha Counties
- Frequency: 1400 kHz
- Branding: WRJN

Programming
- Format: Full service oldies
- Affiliations: NBC News Radio; Packers Radio Network; Milwaukee Brewers Radio Network; Wisconsin Badgers Radio Network

Ownership
- Owner: Civic Media, Inc.
- Sister stations: WAUK; WRJM

History
- First air date: December 1926
- Former call signs: WLBG (1926); WRRS (1926–1928)
- Call sign meaning: Racine Journal News (founder of station; name of Racine Journal Times before 1932 merger with the Times-Call)

Technical information
- Licensing authority: FCC
- Facility ID: 41437
- Class: C
- Power: 1,000 watts unlimited
- Transmitter coordinates: 42°42′38.07″N 87°49′49.28″W
- Translators: 98.1 W251BU (Kenosha); 99.9 W260CV (Racine)
- Repeater: 1290 WRJM (Greenfield)

Links
- Public license information: Public file; LMS
- Webcast: Listen live
- Website: wrjn.com

WRJN (1400 AM) is a full service radio station in Racine, Wisconsin, serving Racine and Kenosha Counties. The station is owned by Civic Media, Inc. WRJN features live sports including Green Bay Packers football, Milwaukee Brewers baseball, and Wisconsin Badgers games. WRJN's studios and transmitter tower are on Victory Avenue at 17th Street in Racine.

WRJN is a Class C station powered at 1,000 watts, using a non-directional antenna. Programming is also heard on two FM translators: W260CV at 99.9 MHz in Racine and W251BU at 98.1 MHz in Kenosha. Most of WRJN's programming is also heard on WRJM (1290 AM) in Greenfield (near Milwaukee).

== History ==
=== Early years ===
WRJN dates back to the first decade of commercial radio broadcasting. It signed on the air in December 1926. The station was originally issued the call sign WLBG, but quickly changed to WRRS. On April 28, 1928, the station became WRJN, which stood for its then-owner, the Racine Journal News. By the 1930s, it was broadcasting on 1370 kHz at 100 watts, a fraction of its current power, with studios in the Hotel Racine. With the North American Regional Broadcasting Agreement (NARBA) enacted in 1941, WRJN moved to its current dial position at 1400 AM.

In August 1948, it added a sister station, WRJN-FM at 100.7 MHz. For its first few decades, it largely simulcast WRJN 1400 AM. (That station is now WKKV-FM, owned by iHeartMedia, Inc.) In the 1950s, 1960s and 1970s, WRJN aired a middle of the road radio format featuring popular adult music, news and sports.

=== Talk radio era ===
By the 1980s, most listeners tuned into the FM dial for music. As an AM station, WRJN gradually added more talk shows and reduced its music programming. From the late 1980s until 2014, WRJN carried a talk radio format using a combination of local and syndicated talk programs. The station was the Milwaukee-area affiliate for shows hosted by Lionel, Bill O'Reilly and Mike Gallagher. It added programs from Alan Colmes, Ed Schultz, Leslie Marshall and carried Coast to Coast AM with Art Bell overnight. WRJN continued to be affiliated with ABC News Radio and aired Paul Harvey's commentaries several times each weekday.

In its later years, it effectively serving as a "last resort" station for shows not picked up in the Milwaukee radio market by the dominant talk stations, WTMJ and WISN. For a period in the mid-1990s, WRJN would simulcast sister station 92.1 WEZY's easy listening format during the overnight hours.

=== Magnum Broadcasting ===
On June 25, 2014, Bliss Communications announced that it would sell WRJN and WEZY, along with sister stations WBKV and WBWI-FM in West Bend, to David Magnum's Magnum Communications, Inc. Bliss had owned WRJN and WEZY since 1997. The sale, at a price of $2.25 million, was consummated on October 31, 2014.

On December 1, 2014, WRJN dropped all syndicated programming from the lineup and replaced it with a mixture of local talk, sports, and classic hits, oldies and adult contemporary music. It used the new positioner "Your Radio Friend". It was a similar format to sister station WPDR in Portage. The music format shifted to 1960s and 1970s oldies after sister station WVTY adopted an adult hits format in May 2015.

In the fall of 2016, two FM translators were added: 99.9 W260CV in Racine, and 98.1 W251BU in Kenosha.

=== Progressive talk and full service oldies ===
Civic Media purchased WRJN from Magnum Media in 2023, as part of a $3.65 million deal that also included stations in La Crosse and Chippewa Falls; Magnum would retain WVTY. On June 5, 2023, WRJN changed its format from classic hits, oldies and middle of the road music to progressive talk. It featured a line up of hosts shared with co-owned 540 WAUK in Milwaukee. Most hours began with an update from CBS News Radio.

On May 14, 2024, WRJN returned to full service oldies programming. It plays hits from the 1960s and 1970s with local DJs and newscasters, along with national and world news from CBS. Civic Media's brand of progressive talk continues on WAUK.

== Translators ==
Call sign	Frequency	City of license	FID	ERP (W)	Class	Transmitter coordinates	FCC info
W251BU	98.1 FM	Kenosha, Wisconsin	152103	250	D	42°36′32.1″N 87°50′36.3″W	LMS
W260CV	99.9 FM	Racine, Wisconsin	157055	250	D	42°42′38.1″N 87°49′49.3″W	LMS
