= Scott Shuster =

American TV journalist and interviewer

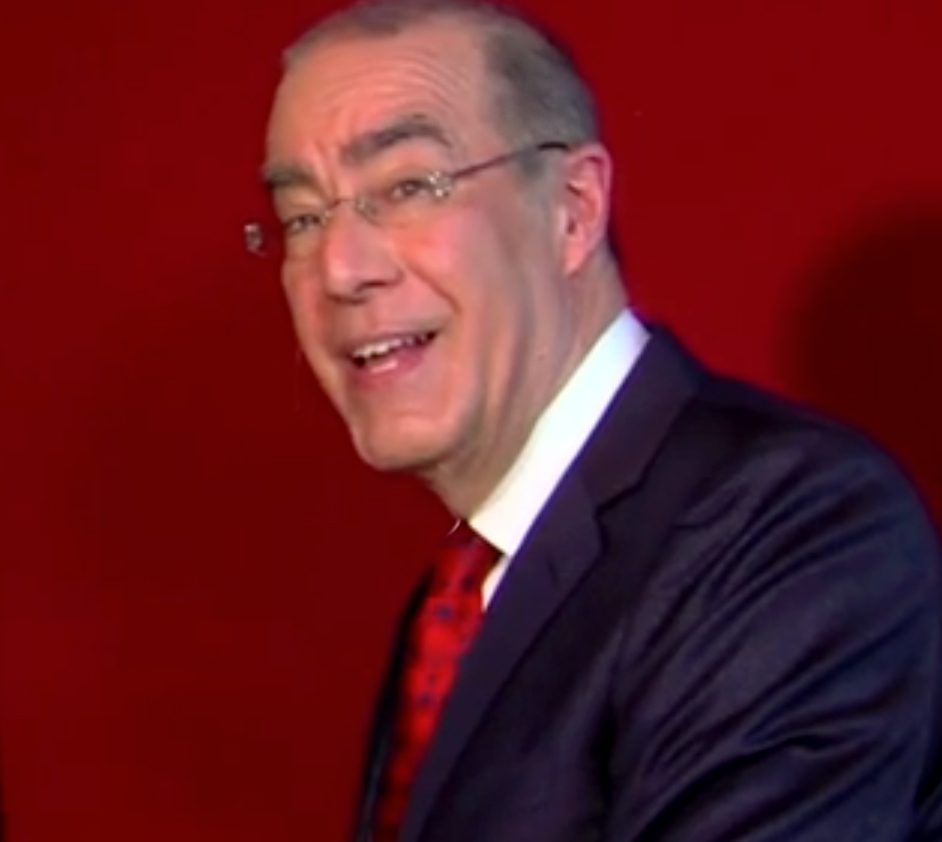
- Scott Shuster in 2014
- Born: c. 1953–1958; Greendale, Wisconsin, United States
- Education: International Institute for Management Development
- Occupations: Business Journalist, Corporate Events Moderator
- Children: 2 (Victoria, Eric)
- Website: www.scottshuster.com

Scott Shuster is a US broadcast journalist and a professional event moderator and interviewer of senior business executives at corporate events.

For many years he was a foreign correspondent of ABC News (US), and was one of the early producers of All Things Considered at National Public Radio (NPR). Later he became the editorial director for live events within the BusinessWeek Group of The McGraw-Hill Companies.

Shuster has conducted over 5,000 live interviews of management leaders before audiences of their business peers at corporate, industry, professional, and governmental policy and investment events around the world.

== Early life and education ==
Scott Shuster is a native of Greendale, Wisconsin. He received the first B.A. in Mass Communication from the University of Wisconsin–Milwaukee, and also studied Political Science (Latin America) at Marquette University.

He later gained an MBA degree at Switzerland's IMEDE/IMD, International Institute for Management Development, Lausanne, Switzerland. Scott has been a member of the adjunct faculty of the Columbia University Graduate School of Journalism, and has spoken widely on the governance of journalism and communications, including a French-language tour of francophone African countries for the United States Information Agency.

== Career ==
=== Radio and television ===
Scott Shuster became a local radio newscaster in Milwaukee at age 16 while still in high school (radio stations WRIT-FM and WOKY). By 18 he was on television delivering the 11 o’clock news on Milwaukee's WVTV-TV, and by age 24 he was the highest-rated local television news presenter in the US, at WTVT, the CBS affiliate in Tampa-St.Petersburg, Florida. Shuster's popularity as an anchorman is attributed to the personable, conversational news presentation style he used at a time (1970s) when US local television news presentation was primarily serious, featuring none of the chit-chat among on-camera presenters that later became the norm. While at WTVT Scott Shuster wrote and delivered a report on a record-setting Led Zeppelin concert held in Tampa. Thirty-eight years later this report was featured as the opening scene of Led Zeppelin's 2014 Celebration Day theatrical movie release.

Noticed at WTVT-TV by Florida native Deborah Amos of National Public Radio, Shuster was invited to move to Washington and join NPR where he became one of the early producers of All Things Considered evening news magazine program. Shuster later joined the Washington-based Associated Press Radio Network, and the Africa Service of the Voice of America, before becoming the Geneva, Switzerland-based foreign correspondent of ABC News, first under ABC's Paris Bureau Chief Pierre Salinger and later reporting directly to ABC Chief Foreign Correspondent Peter Jennings. For nine years with ABC Shuster worked in more than 40 developing countries covering mainly Africa, South and East Asia, and Latin America.

In 1986, CNN executive producer Stuart Loory approached Scott Shuster for help with a new program he was planning, CNN World Report (today known as CNN World View). The program was to launch in 1987 and would feature news items produced by the (at that time largely government-owned) television broadcasters of a list of nations, eventually 150 countries. This content would be broadcast worldwide: On CNN in the US, on CNN International around the world, as well as on the government-owned broadcasting stations that contributed the material. Knowing of Shuster's long experience as the guy in the Safari Suit reporting for ABC from the most distant lands, Loory asked Shuster to try to sign up government broadcasters in Africa in particular. Shuster visited and brought to CNN program contribution relationships with the television broadcasters of Senegal, Ivory Coast, Ghana, Zaire (today's Democratic Republic of Congo), and with the government film unit of Sudan (where there was as yet, no television).

=== Business journalism and live events ===
Returning to the US, Shuster moved to New York to join McGraw-Hill's BusinessWeek magazine, then the world's leading global business news weekly publication. He became the founding editorial director of McGraw-Hill's worldwide business event development organization, BusinessWeek Executive Programs. Reporting directly to company scion James H. McGraw IV, Shuster pioneered a new TV-talk-show style corporate meeting format. Eschewing the norm of slide-supported speeches by business executives, which he viewed as dated, Shuster insisted that the norm at BusinessWeek events be live, unrehearsed interviews, always with the potential for audience questioning of the executives on stage.

Scott Shuster chaired all BusinessWeek events worldwide for 17 years further developing the all-discussion format at top-tier events including BusinessWeek's forums of chief executive officers, chief financial officers, chief information officers, and other corporate leaders.

He interviewed hundreds of business executives before audiences of their peers across the US, and as BusinessWeek's international events footprint expanded to include the newly-open international business environments of China, Russia and Latin America, Scott brought the live interview business event format to Europe, Latin America and Asia. From President George H.W. Bush to Wikipedia founder Jimmy Wales, Scott has interviewed more than 5000 leaders and management executives.

Later, while maintaining a role as consulting editor to The McGraw-Hill Companies, Scott continued his work as a business event moderator for corporations, governments, industry associations and professional societies.

Shuster has published works of Tolkien scholars such as Elizabeth Solopova under his imprint North Landing Books.

=== Selected business and policy forums chaired ===
- Toyota USA's Together, We are Toyota National Dealer Meeting, Las Vegas, where Scott conducted a 90-minute live Q&A session with Toyota's entire US leadership team: The president of Toyota Motor Sales, the VP for the Toyota Division, the senior VP for automotive operations, and the president and CEO of Toyota Financial Services, in the presence of the founding/owning Toyoda family, and more than 5000 US Toyota dealer executives.
- The Hashemite Royal Court (Government of Jordan) - A series of 6 investment promotion appearances of King Abdullah II and Queen Rania across the US, interviewing them and others before gatherings of corporate executives considering investment in Jordan; In Amman and Dead Sea, Jordan: Six consecutive biennial Middle East and North Africa Region Information and Communications Technology Forums (The MENA ICT Forum) each featuring one or more live interviews of HM King Abdullah onstage before information technology professionals from across the Arab region.
- The Cisco CIO Summit - Moderator and interviewer at this three-day gathering of Cisco's top customers and senior leadership, including CEO John Chambers. This event marking John Chambers and Scott Shuster's 6th appearance together.
- The Commonfund Forum - Chairmanship and interviews at the luncheon session of this annual premier event for institutional investors. With Wikipedia founder Jimmy Wales.
- BMO - Bank of Montreal Annual Senior Leadership Forum, interviews over dinner.
- Microsoft Corporation presents: The Government Leaders Forum, Arabia (Abu Dhabi): Interviews of e-government leaders from across the Arab world, before an audience of their peers assembled by Microsoft Corporation.
- For CXO Sync, dba CIOsynergy, CFO.org, CMO.org, secureCISO, America's largest creator of private corporate events: 2012–present: End-to-end chairmanship of more than 100 private management leadership gatherings in London, Germany, India, and 15+ cities across the US and Canada. All-day onstage interviews of senior executives of large corporations, governmental departments, and educational institutions on management and social/cultural topics.
