= WKKV-FM =

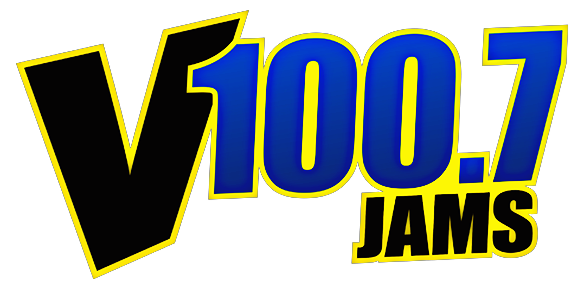
- Racine, Wisconsin; United States
- Broadcast area: Milwaukee metropolitan area
- Frequency: 100.7 MHz (HD Radio)
- Branding: V-100.7

Programming
- Format: Urban contemporary
- Affiliations: Premiere Networks

Ownership
- Owner: iHeartMedia, Inc.; (iHM Licenses, LLC)
- Sister stations: WISN, WMIL-FM, WOKY, WRIT-FM, WRNW

History
- First air date: August 1948 (as WRJN-FM)
- Former call signs: WRJN-FM (1948–1969); WRAC-FM (1969–1970); WRKR (1970–1986); WHBT-FM (1986–1987); WBZN-FM (1987–1991)
- Call sign meaning: "KK" likely for the Kinnickinnic River's common nickname, with the "V" a common branding for R&B and hip-hop stations

Technical information
- Licensing authority: FCC
- Facility ID: 68758
- Class: B
- ERP: 50,000 watts
- HAAT: 152 meters (499 ft)
- Transmitter coordinates: 42.805°N 88.048°W

Links
- Public license information: Public file; LMS
- Webcast: Listen live (via iHeartRadio)
- Website: v100.iheart.com

WKKV-FM (100.7 MHz), also known as V-100.7, is an urban contemporary radio station owned by iHeartMedia, Inc. serving the Milwaukee area. The station broadcasts with an ERP of 50 kW and is licensed to Racine, Wisconsin. Its studios are located in the Milwaukee suburb of Greenfield.

V-100.7's playlist primarily consists of current hip-hop and R&B, although it also airs hip hop and R&B from the 2010s.

At 50,000 watts, WKKV's signal is one of the strongest in the area, and can travel over Lake Michigan into the state of Michigan. V-100.7 can be heard reliably as far west as Madison, north to Sheboygan, south into the Chicago suburbs, and beyond depending on conditions. Due to its tower lying near the open waters of Lake Michigan, its analog signal can periodically travel with local quality in excess of 120 miles to the east along the Michigan shoreline without interference, this is most common in the summer months when warm air temperatures and the cool lake waters create favorable conditions for tropospheric propagation.

== History ==
The original call letters were WRJN-FM, shared with its then-sister station. WRJN-FM began broadcasting August 26, 1948. It was licensed to Racine Broadcasting Corporation and owned by the publishers of the Racine Journal Times.

In early 1969, the owner of another Racine station, WRAC, purchased WRJN-FM for $60,000. A few months after the sale, the station became WRAC-FM.

In December 1970, WRAC-FM flipped to a rock-based Top 40 format with the WRKR call sign, primarily targeting Racine, Kenosha and the southern part of Milwaukee County. They were known at various times as "The Rocker 100 FM", "Hot 100" and "Hitradio 100". WRKR gradually started targeting the whole Milwaukee market. At one time, WRKR was the Milwaukee-area affiliate of American Top 40 (which was also later carried by then-rival WKTI after it added the show in 1982).

Due to heavy Top 40 competition, WRKR began adding light R&B music around 1986, and for less than a year were called "Heartbeat 101" (WHBT-FM). WHBT-FM was the first "rhythmic adult contemporary" station in the country, 10 years before pioneer WAMG-FM flipped to the format. The WRKR call sign was reassigned by the FCC to a station in Kalamazoo, Michigan, about that time, where it remains today.

In September 1987, the station became new-age music-formatted WBZN-FM (Breezin' 100.7). The station flipped to urban contemporary on June 6, 1991, becoming WKKV-FM (V-100 FM).

After many years, the "Doug Banks Morning Show" ended in December 2007, and the station replaced him with Steve Harvey. After six years, Harvey was dropped in August 2013, and WKKV-FM became a charter affiliate of the New York-based Breakfast Club distributed in-house by iHeartRadio.

WKKV was home to the annual "Jam 4 Peace" concert for several years. The concert series caused political attention and action in the City of Milwaukee.

Slower R&B and classic soul was aired as part of a late night Quiet Storm block on weeknights during the 90s and 2000s.

WKKV DJs holds significant influence in the greater radio market. Bailey Coleman was a senior VP of Programming for iHeartMedia. Her show aired during the midday 10:00 a.m. to 2:00 p.m. time slot. Reggie Brown currently serves as the station's Program Director and has worked at the station for more than 20 years.

== HD Radio ==
On April 25, 2006, Clear Channel announced that WKKV's HD2 subchannel will carry a format focusing on gospel music. In the summer of 2009, the "Hallelujah" format was replaced by "All My Jams," an Adult Urban Contemporary format available through Clear Channel's iHeartRadio smartphone application.

On December 15, 2011, Clear Channel began airing the progressive talk programming of WXXM (92.1) from Sun Prairie/Madison on WKKV's HD3 subchannel, giving the Milwaukee market its first station in the format, albeit with no programming originating locally from Milwaukee. After WXXM ended that format in November 2016, WKKV-HD2 began to serve as an FM HD repeater of sports station WOKY (920). It again switched on November 30, 2018, with a move to soft adult contemporary, branded as "The Breeze"; the move of WOKY's local sports programming to WRNW's analog FM/HD1 subchannel made it all but redundant.

As of June 2023, WKKV does not broadcast a HD2 station. The station only broadcasts a HD1 simulcast of the primary station.
