= WMKQ =

WMKQ may refer to:

- WARW (FM), a radio station (96.7 FM) licensed to serve Port Chester, New York, which held the call sign WMKQ from July 11 to 19, 2019
- WKLV-FM, a radio station (93.5 FM) licensed to serve Butler, Alabama, which held the call sign WMKQ from 2018 to 2019
- WBDL-LD, a low-power television station (channel 18, virtual 8) licensed to serve Elk Mound, Wisconsin, United States, which held the call sign WMKQ-LP from 2015 to 2017
- WVTY, a radio station (92.1 FM) licensed to serve Racine, Wisconsin, which held the call sign WMKQ from 2014 to 2015
