= WAUK =

Radio station in Jackson, Wisconsin

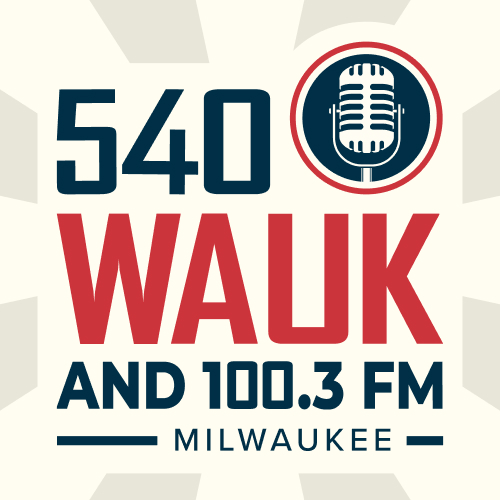
- Jackson, Wisconsin; United States
- Broadcast area: Milwaukee metropolitan area
- Frequency: 540 kHz
- Branding: 540 WAUK and 100.3 FM

Programming
- Language: English
- Format: News/Talk
- Affiliations: NBC News Radio

Ownership
- Owner: Civic Media; (Civic Media, Inc.)
- Sister stations: WISS; WRJN; WMDX; WRJM

History
- First air date: May 1, 1964
- Former call signs: WYLO (1964–1995); WZER (1995–2001); WYLO (2001); WRRD (2001–2008)
- Call sign meaning: Waukesha (city of license for the 101.1 translator and the original WAUK at 1510 AM)

Technical information
- Licensing authority: FCC
- Facility ID: 10824
- Class: B
- Power: 400 watts
- Transmitter coordinates: 43°20′0″N 88°9′11.3″W
- Translators: 100.3 W262CJ (Milwaukee); 101.1 W266DR (Waukesha)

Links
- Public license information: Public file; LMS
- Webcast: Listen live
- Website: waukradio.com

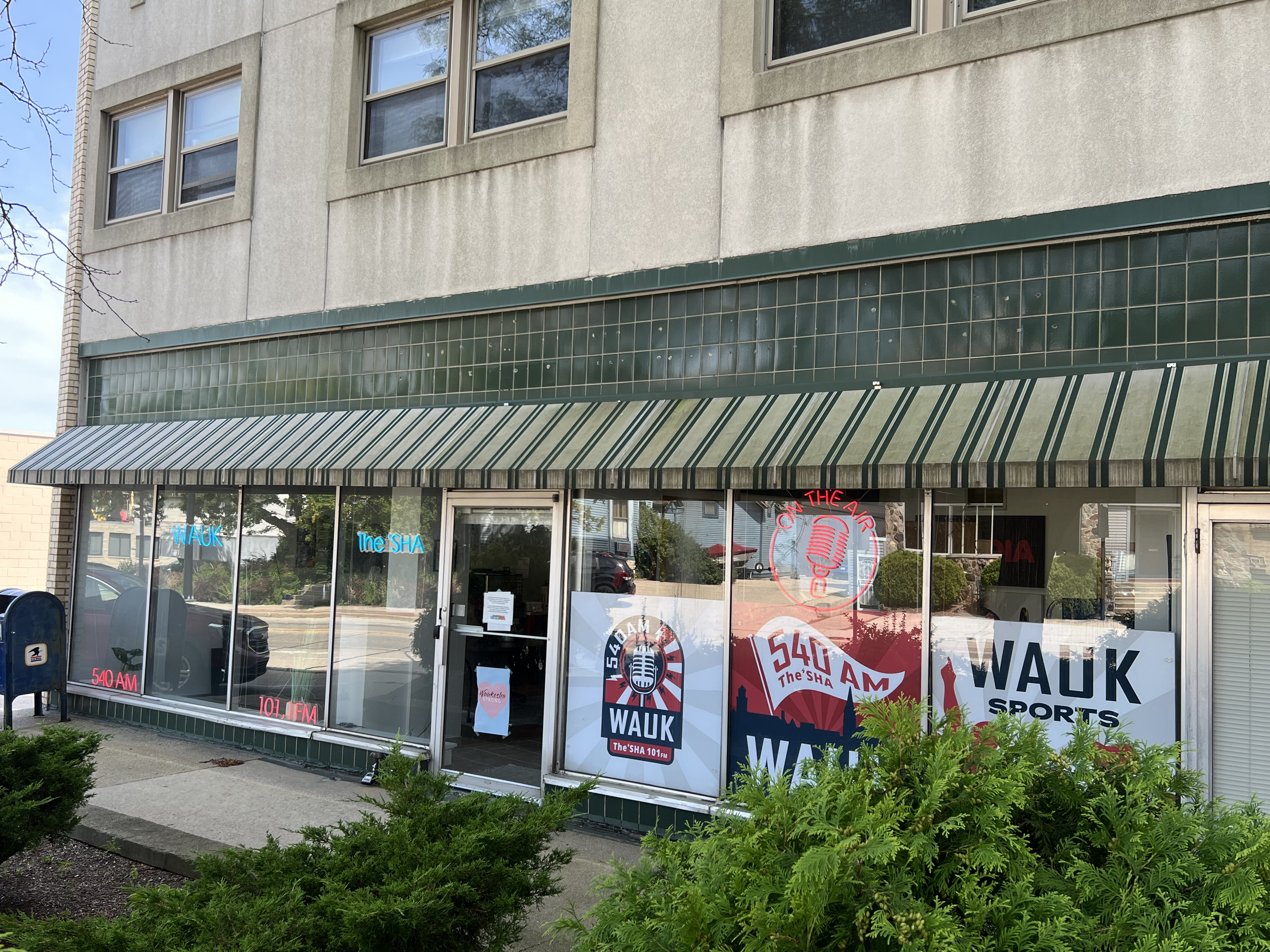
Studio in Waukesha

WAUK (540 AM) is a News/Talk radio station licensed to Jackson, Wisconsin, and serving the Milwaukee metropolitan area. Branded 540 WAUK and 100.3 FM, the station's studios and offices are in Racine.

The station is owned and operated by Civic Media with locally programmed news and talk programming. WAUK shares some of its programming with Madison-based WMDX with programming throughout the day live and locally based from studios at both stations.

== History ==
The station signed on in 1964 with the call sign WYLO, which stood for "Way Low" (the station's position on the AM dial). WYLO ran a country music format for many years before switching to Christian programming. From 1995 to 2001, the WZER call sign was used, prior to briefly returning to WYLO and finally, WRRD.

In the 1990s, WZER broadcast a mix of Contemporary Christian music and Ethnic programming on the weekend.

In 1998, the station was purchased by Minneapolis-based Catholic Family Radio, which broadcast a Catholic Radio format on various radio stations across the country, many of these former Radio AAHS stations. At this time, the Ethnic programming shifted to WEMP (Now WSSP) and later WJOI when that station switched to a Sports format.

In 2000, Catholic Family Radio shut down and stations were put up for sale. Salem Communications bought the station in October 2000, and switched initially to a simulcast WYLL Chicago while using the WYLO call letters beginning in early 2001. In the fall of 2001, the call letters changed to WRRD and the station began operating its own Christian Talk, Preaching format branded as "The Word".

Salem sold WRRD in early 2008 to Good Karma Broadcasting.

Good Karma Broadcasting took over operation of the signal on February 7, 2008, moving the format of 1510 AM from that daytimer-limited signal to the full-time 24/7 signal of WRRD. Formerly, ESPN Radio was heard on WAUK during the day, and WMCS (1290) from 6pm-6am since January 1, 2005, under the branding Milwaukee's ESPN Radio – 1510 Days/1290 Nights. On February 12, 2008, WAUK's call letters were switched to the 540 frequency, with the WRRD calls moving to 1510.

The new "540 ESPN" simulcasts continued with 1510 AM until May 5, 2008, when Good Karma converted the new WRRD to ESPN Deportes Radio, a Spanish language sports talk format. WMCS's time brokering arrangement with WAUK ended on June 30, 2008, when the station reclaimed nighttime hours for the music and community talk format the station aired the rest of the day until a March 2013 format change to standards as WZTI. On November 1, 2018, following Good Karma Brands' acquisition of WTMJ (620) and WKTI (94.5) from the E.W. Scripps Company, WKTI began simulcasting WAUK's programming as "94.5 ESPN FM".

As of April 20, 2020, the station began to serve as a temporary over-the-air simulcast of SiriusXM's COVID-19 pandemic-specific discussion and news channel which is an extension of the service's Doctor Radio channel; SiriusXM has made the channel available to any interested broadcaster without charge, and offers it free and clear on both their streaming and satellite radio platforms without a required subscription. It returned to regular ESPN Radio programming by mid-July 2020 as American professional sports began to resume. In late August 2020, the former WRRD (and its FM translator in Milwaukee) began to simulcast WAUK after its current owner (which Good Karma sold the station to in 2017) decided to wind down its operations as a progressive talk outlet and sell the station's studio and transmitter facility.

The station was previously owned by Beaver Dam-based Good Karma Brands (formerly Good Karma Broadcasting, LLC), headed by Craig Karmazin, son of legendary radio executive Mel Karmazin. Sister station WKTI 94.5 FM carries mainly local sports talk and WTMJ 620 AM/103.3 FM airs a news/talk and sports format.

On January 3, 2022, WAUK changed its format from sports to talk as "The Sha 101 FM".

Effective June 30, 2022, Good Karma Brands sold WAUK and translator W266DR to Michael Crute's WAUK Radio, LLC for $650,000. Effective December 30, 2022, the station and the translator were flipped to Michael Crute and Sage Weil's Civic Media, Inc. for $775,668.

On September 17, 2025, WAUK began simulcasting on FM translator W262CJ 100.3 FM Milwaukee.

On October 8, 2025, WAUK debuted "All News All Morning," with host Dan Hanni. The show airs from 6-9am weekdays. The format is similar to programming on 1010 WINS New York City and WBBM-AM Chicago: A news "wheel," featuring a quick recap of local and state news, weather, sports and traffic. The 20-minute block then repeats, with updates and fresh stories.

== Previous sports programming ==
On June 4, 2019, Good Karma ended the simulcast and made WAUK mostly a pass-through for the national ESPN Radio schedule, with WKTI becoming a more locally based sports talk station. This is a common scheduling practice for co-owned sports talk stations. The only diversion WAUK normally takes from the national ESPN Radio schedule is replacing The Will Cain Show for carriage of ESPN Milwaukee Podcenter, which compiles best-of content for the afternoon drive and is hosted by Doug Russell. ESPN Radio commercial breaks, where contractually possible, are replaced with local and sponsored content.

WAUK and WKTI are the flagships of the Marquette University Golden Eagles. The station also aired play-by-play coverage of Major League Baseball, the College Football Playoff and the NBA from ESPN Radio.

Until 2011, the station had also been the Milwaukee home of NASCAR radio coverage from all three NASCAR radio networks, as well as the LTN Hour radio show since its inception in 1985 and the Racing Roundup show. On the November 27 edition of the LTN Hour, it was announced that WAUK would be dropping all racing programming by the end of 2011, with racing play-by-play acquired days later by Clear Channel's classic country station, WOKY (920), which eventually would go to a mixed format in January 2013 of sports talk from WTSO and Fox Sports and NBC Sports Radio programming. Clear Channel, currently known as iHeartMedia, gained the rights to Wisconsin Badgers sports for the Milwaukee market in 2014 for WAUK and WRIT-FM, usurping WAUK's limited role of airing football and basketball games pre-empted by WTMJ (620) due to rights conflicts.

WAUK transmits with 400 watts, largely to protect CBK in Watrous, Saskatchewan, a clear-channel station also on 540 AM. Despite its modest power, WAUK's signal covers a relatively substantial area due to its low frequency and Wisconsin's flat land.
