= WLWK =

WLWK may refer to:

- WLWK-CD, a low-power television station (channel 19, virtual 22) licensed to serve Sturgeon Bay, Wisconsin, United States
- WKTI, a radio station (94.5 FM) licensed to serve Milwaukee, Wisconsin, which held the call sign WLWK-FM from 2008 to 2015
