= WRNW =

Adult contemporary radio station in Milwaukee

- Milwaukee, Wisconsin; United States
- Broadcast area: Greater Milwaukee
- Frequency: 97.3 MHz (HD Radio)
- Branding: B97.3

Programming
- Format: Adult contemporary
- Subchannels: HD2: Talk (WISN)

Ownership
- Owner: iHeartMedia, Inc.; (iHM Licenses, LLC)
- Sister stations: WISN, WKKV-FM, WMIL-FM, WOKY, WRIT-FM

History
- First air date: January 1961
- Former call signs: WISN-FM (1961–1978); WLPX (1978–1984); WBTT (1984–1985); WLTQ (1985–2004); WQBW (2004–2010)
- Call sign meaning: "Radio Now" (previous format)

Technical information
- Licensing authority: FCC
- Facility ID: 26609
- Class: B
- ERP: 15,500 watts
- HAAT: 278 meters (912 ft)
- Transmitter coordinates: 43.111°N 87.927°W

Links
- Public license information: Public file; LMS
- Webcast: Listen live (via iHeartRadio)
- Website: b973fm.iheart.com

WRNW (97.3 FM) is a commercial radio station in Milwaukee, Wisconsin, known as "B97.3". It airs an adult contemporary radio format and is owned by iHeartMedia, Inc. The studios are on West Howard Avenue in Greenfield.

WRNW is a Class B FM station with an effective radiated power (ERP) of 15,500 watts. The station transmits from the tower of its former sister television station WISN-TV (channel 12) in Lincoln Park, near the Milwaukee River. WRNW broadcasts using HD Radio technology. Its HD2 digital subchannel carries talk radio programming from co-owned WISN (1130 AM); WISN-TV is owned by Hearst Television and outside its tower lease, has no current connection to its former radio sisters.

== History ==
=== WISN-FM (1961–1978) ===
The station signed on the air in January 1961 as WISN-FM, the sister station to WISN (1130 AM). This was the second iteration of WISN-FM, after a short-lived attempt in 1949 on 102.9 FM, where WHQG is now heard.

At the beginning, 1130 AM and 97.3 FM mostly simulcast their programming. They were co-owned for many years with television station WISN-TV as part of the Hearst Corporation, a newspaper and broadcasting conglomerate. From the late 1960s until 1978, WISN-FM carried an automated beautiful music format. It played quarter-hour sweeps of primarily instrumental music, with some Broadway and Hollywood show tunes. Its longtime easy listening rivals were WTMJ-FM, (now WKTI) owned by the Milwaukee Journal and WEZW (now WXSS).

=== Rock (1978–1983) ===
In 1978, the station flipped to album oriented rock (AOR) as WLPX. It used consultant Lee Abrams' "SuperStars" format. The formula for the station was to play only the biggest rock stars and concentrate on their best selling albums.

The station became an immediate success in the ratings. WLPX pushed rival WZMF to tighten its format and later drop it altogether for beautiful music with new call letters WXJY. WLPX also sponsored future NASCAR Hall of Fame inductee Alan Kulwicki on local racetracks on the ASA, ARTGO, and regional circuits, which led to the association of his car number 97 in the Midwest with the radio station.

=== Top 40 (1983–1985) ===
On August 22, 1983, WLPX abruptly switched to Top 40 (CHR), first as 97X, then shortly after as WBTT, B-97. WBTT was a short-time affiliate of Dan Ingram's Top 40 Satellite Survey.

=== Adult contemporary (1985–2004) ===
Satellite Soft adult contemporary from Transtar's "Format 41" became the format in April 1985 as "Light 97" with the WLTQ call sign. Later adding local programming, the station's disc jockeys often appeared on WISN-TV in various roles, including hosting a telethon and doing remote broadcasts. They were also seen on programs involving the Wisconsin Lottery.

WLTQ featured the popular syndicated call-in and request show Delilah in the evening shift.

The station enjoyed high ratings through the late 1980s, 1990s, and early 2000s, particularly in the "at-work" audience, eventually eroding the audience of its longtime rival, WEZW. By 2003, WLTQ's ratings started dropping considerably, as the station's stodgy "Light" image turned many younger listeners away, who associated it negatively as resembling 'elevator music' with the fading of both easy listening and lite AC formats in the late 1990s into the early 2000s.

=== Classic rock and adult hits (2004–2010) ===
On September 17, 2004, at noon, "Light 97.3" signed off with "We Said Hello, Goodbye" by Phil Collins. WLTQ then began stunting with songs with the words "air" or "America" in the title, telling people "Milwaukee will be TALKing about 97.3" while airing clips of Al Franken, promoting to listen the following Monday at 6 a.m. Clear Channel played into rumors of conversion of the station into a left-wing Air America-based talk format, already carried by WLTQ's sister station in Madison.

Instead, 97.3 adopted an 1980s-centric Classic rock format as 97.3 The Brew, launching with "(You Can Still) Rock in America" by Night Ranger. The call sign was soon changed to WQBW to match the "Brew" branding. The station's initial slogan was "Rock of the '80s and More", which eventually changed to "The Biggest Variety of Rock Hits". The station's television ads and billboard advertisements featured an obese shirtless man named "Dancin' Kevin" based on an imaging campaign at WLUP-FM in Chicago. The station's personalities were live and local in the morning, middays and afternoons.

By coincidence, the WLTQ calls were immediately warehoused on sister station WSCC (730 AM) in Charleston, South Carolina, where that station was converted by Clear Channel to carry Air America and other liberal talk programming (the station was sold in 2008 and now carries EWTN Radio programming, still under the same WLTQ calls).

WQBW immediately experienced ratings success with the new format, which led to direct competitors WKLH and WLZR (both sister stations owned by Saga Communications) adjusting their playlists and formats accordingly. WLZR (which had already been experiencing declines due to a decline in the format and awkward schedule flow from their talk-centric morning show) dropped its active rock format for a more older-targeting, harder-leaning mainstream rock format as "The Hog", while WKLH (shifting towards a straightforward classic rock format as the classic hits format overall became pop-centric) adopted new on-air imaging. Both of these changes drew listeners back from WQBW, prompting the station to shift towards adult hits by 2008. In addition, rival WKTI (then airing a hot adult contemporary format) flipped to adult hits that same year, with a playlist featuring many of the same artists being played on WQBW. With all of these changes, WQBW ended up being the lowest-rated station in the market with the format it originated.

=== Top 40 (2010–2018) ===
At 9 a.m. on May 28, 2010, after playing "The Final Countdown" by Europe, the station returned to Top 40 (CHR) with the branding "97-3 Radio Now." The first song was "Tik Tok" by Ke$ha. The move was made quickly to pre-empt an expected format change by WJZX, who ended their smooth jazz format and began a stunt format known as "Tiger Radio" the day before WQBW's flip. The station's new format was likely to be Rhythmic Top 40 under the new callsign WNQW, which prompted Clear Channel to act quickly and claim the "Now" name and brand before WJZX owner Saga Communications could claim it. The airstaff and morning show returned to the station on July 26, though the title of the morning show changed to "Connie and Curtis" after "Fish" Calloway's departure a week after the format change.

On June 10, 2010, WQBW's call letters were officially changed to WRNW. That call sign had previously been used from 1960 until 1982 for WXPK in the New York City suburb of Briarcliff Manor, the station where Howard Stern first hosted mornings.

WRNW's format change gave longtime top 40 powerhouse WXSS its first-in-market competition since WKTI's switch to adult hits. WRNW's Top 40 musical direction favored a pop/rock approach, as it played less rhythmic/hip hop music than WXSS and most other large market contemporary hit stations.

On August 31, 2012, the Connie and Curtis morning show ended on WRNW and Madison sister station WZEE, and was replaced with Premiere Networks' syndicated Elvis Duran and the Morning Show on September 4. That same week, WRNW picked up new competition from WZBK-FM, who, after WRNW beat them to the punch with the "Radio Now" format flip, finally made the switch to Rhythmic Top 40, this time as "Energy 106.9" (and new call letters WNRG-FM) on September 7.

In late April 2015, the station re-branded as "97-3 Now", and began using a logo similar to KISS-FM branded stations. On September 14, 2016, the station announced that the morning show would be brought back to being hosted locally in-house, with former WXSS morning personality Rahny Taylor returning to Milwaukee after a three-year stint on the national K-Love network to host the new show, starting the next day.

=== Sports (2018–2025) ===
Just after midnight on November 27, 2018, after playing "Eastside" by Benny Blanco and a commercial break, WRNW flipped to sports talk as 97.3 The Game. The station inherited the local programming of sister AM station WOKY, including Drew & KB, The Crossover, The Mike Heller Show, and The Double Team. Fox Sports Radio programs are carried on nights and weekends. With this change, WOKY shifted to a primarily syndicated lineup, carrying most of the national Fox Sports Radio lineup. WRNW also carries coverage of Wisconsin Badgers sports from Learfield Sports, along with WOKY's former national rights to carry Westwood One Sports and the three NASCAR radio networks, MRN, PRN and IMSRN. It also picked up Wisconsin Badgers football and basketball, which continue to also air on WOKY.

Much of WRNW's daytime schedule has been subsequently syndicated across the state of Wisconsin, mainly to stations owned by Midwest Communications, as of November 2, 2020 (iHeartMedia's presence in those markets is limited due to market concentration among other station groups). That group runs WRNW's programming on WNFL in Green Bay, WRIG in the Wausau market, and WDSM in Duluth–Superior, along with their associated urban FM translators, with WDSM specifically taking "The Game" branding full-time. In March 2021, WTSO in Madison, formerly co-branded with WOKY, began to air the full WRNW schedule in Madison; it had already taken "The Game" branding in association with Fox Sports Radio in early 2020.

On October 27, 2021, the Green Bay Packers announced that WRNW would become the team's Milwaukee affiliate for the Packers Radio Network in 2022, ending a 93-year run on WTMJ, which had served as flagship station for most of that time. The team was already airing on iHeartMedia stations in Madison, Eau Claire, and Moline, Illinois.

=== B97.3 (2025–present) ===
In October 2025, the station laid off morning hosts Steve Czaban and Brian Butch, evening host Matt Schneidman, and program director Tim Scott amid nationwide cuts by owner iHeartMedia.

At noon on October 13, WRNW abruptly dropped the "Game" format and flipped back to adult contemporary after 21 years as "B97.3", assuming the branding of soon-to-depart WLDB ahead of their sale to K-Love. The first song after the relaunch was "Happy" by Pharrell Williams. With the flip, the rights to the Badgers and Packers will move to WRIT-FM, with WOKY remaining unchanged.

At midnight on November 3, the station flipped to Christmas music, continuing the holiday tradition previously carried by WLDB of switching to holiday programming in November, and the station's first Christmas conversion since 2003, when it was still WLTQ. Holiday programming was also shifted from co-owned WRIT-FM to WRNW. Despite the station's new branding, the station will retain its WRNW call letters.

== WRNW-HD2 ==
On April 25, 2006, Clear Channel announced that WQBW's HD2 subchannel would carry Radio Radio from their Format Lab, a format focusing on classic modern rock hits. It was later replaced by the Rock Nation feed from Format Lab, which features active rock. From February 2011 until August 2012, the HD2 signal carried iHeartRadio's "Spin Cycle" automated format with dance/EDM tracks.

At the beginning of August 2012, the HD2 signal began to carry the audio of WISN; although their AM signal is also carried in HD Radio, it is limited after sunset. This returns what had begun as WISN-FM to carrying their AM sister station in some form for the first time in decades.
