= WBWI =

WBWI may refer to:

- WBDL-LD, a low-power television station (channel 18, virtual 8) licensed to serve Elk Mound, Wisconsin, United States, which held the call sign WBWI-LP in 2015
- WMBZ (FM), a radio station (92.5 FM) licensed to serve West Bend, Wisconsin, which held the call sign WBWI-FM from 1988 to 2015
