= Tom Langmyer =

American historian

- Born: Thomas E. Langmyer; Buffalo, New York
- Education: Grove City College
- Occupations: President & CEO, Great Lakes Media Corp.
- Board member of: Alliance for the Great Lakes

Tom Langmyer is an American author, broadcast executive and media consultant.

He is currently CEO of Great Lakes Media Corp.

Langmyer was previously vice president of news/talk/sports radio programming for E. W. Scripps Company and he also served as vice president and general manager of Scripps' Milwaukee radio stations WTMJ (AM) and WKTI. Langmyer joined Scripps in 2013. He previously was vice president and general manager of WGN (AM) in Chicago and KMOX (AM) in St. Louis. He also served as national VP of news/talk formats for CBS Radio.

He began his career in his hometown of Buffalo, New York and later worked for stations in Youngstown, Ohio, Syracuse, New York, New York City and Pittsburgh, Pennsylvania.

In 2018, he was named to the Buffalo Broadcasters Association Hall of Fame.

== Great Lakes author ==
Langmyer's book, Lake Erie: History and Views was published in 2010. The 312-page hardcover book was written to educate readers on the history of Lake Erie and the surrounding region. The account combines narration, factual summaries, historic photographs, engravings, maps, and antique postcards from Langmyer's collection as well as current photographs. Starting with the creation of Lake Erie during the Ice Age, the story describes the lake's discovery by Europeans, the battles for its control, how people settled and developed the region around the lake, and how the population grew along its shores. The "Circle of Cities and Towns" group of chapters, covers the history of most municipalities around the lake. The reader is also taken behind the scenes aboard a 1,000-foot lakeboat, the Walter J. McCarthy Jr., on a journey up the Great Lakes.
