= WRYU =

- West Bend, Wisconsin; United States
- Broadcast area: Washington and Ozaukee Counties
- Frequency: 1470 kHz
- Branding: WRYU 101.3

Programming
- Format: Classic rock
- Affiliations: Compass Media Networks

Ownership
- Owner: David Magnum; (Magnum Communications, Inc.)
- Sister stations: WMBZ

History
- First air date: November 2, 1950
- Former call signs: WBKV (1950–2016); WIBD (2016–2024)
- Call sign meaning: "We Rock You"

Technical information
- Licensing authority: FCC
- Facility ID: 71541
- Class: B
- Power: 2,500 watts
- Transmitter coordinates: 43°22′14.00″N 88°9′58.00″W
- Translators: 93.9 W230DJ (Cedarburg); 101.3 W267CL (West Bend)

Links
- Public license information: Public file; LMS
- Webcast: Listen live
- Website: rockwryu.com

WRYU (1470 AM) is a commercial radio station licensed to West Bend, Wisconsin, United States, and covering Milwaukee's northern suburbs. The station is owned by David Magnum, through licensee Magnum Communications, Inc., and features a classic rock format. The radio studios and offices are on South Main Street in West Bend.

WRYU's transmitter is sited on Hron Road in West Bend. Programming is also heard on FM translators W230DJ at 93.9 MHz and W267CL at 101.3 MHz.

== History ==
=== MOR and classic country ===
The station signed on the air on November 2, 1950, as WBKV (stands for West Bend Kettle Morraine Valley). It was a 1,000-watt daytimer, required to go off the air at night. WBKV aired a full service format featuring local news, talk and middle of the road (MOR) popular music. The schedule included local high school sports and Wisconsin college sports. In 1958, a sister station was added, 92.9 WBKV-FM (later WBWI and currently WMBZ).

Around 2001, WBKV flipped to a satellite-delivered classic country format to complement sister WBWI-FM, which has a contemporary country music sound. The local morning show was retained but other shows were cancelled. Most of the dayparts during the classic country period were covered by Jones Radio Network's classic country feed. There were voicetracked breaks from local staff in afternoon drive during the week for a few years. Classic country lasted for 12 years.

=== Talk radio ===
The station flipped to a talk radio format around March 2013. WBKV was branded as "LOCAL News/Talk". In addition to covering local high school sports – football, basketball, and baseball – WBKV was also an affiliate of the Wisconsin Badgers Radio Network.

On June 25, 2014, Bliss Communications announced that it would sell WBKV and WBWI-FM, along with sister stations WRJN and WEZY in Racine. The new owner was David Magnum's Magnum Communications, Inc. Bliss had owned WBKV and WBWI since 1970. The sale, at a price of $2.25 million, was consummated on October 31, 2014.

=== Classic hits - oldies ===
On February 7, 2015, WBKV changed its format to classic hits and oldies, branded as "Kool Variety 1470". The station's playlist consisted of the hits of the 1960s, '70s and '80s. WBKV also carried updates from Westwood One News until the network ceased operations in 2020.

On October 28, 2016, WBKV changed its call sign to WIBD. It also added an FM translator at 101.3 FM. The station rebranded as "101.3 and 1470 WIBD".

=== Classic rock ===
The station changed its call sign to WRYU on January 10, 2024. On February 11, 2024, WRYU changed its format from classic hits to classic rock, using the tagline "We Rock You".
