= WPXE-TV =

Television station in Kenosha, Wisconsin

- Kenosha–Milwaukee, Wisconsin; United States
- City: Kenosha, Wisconsin
- Channels: Digital: 30 (UHF); Virtual: 55

Programming
- Affiliations: 55.1: Ion Television; for others, see § Subchannels

Ownership
- Owner: Ion Media; (Ion Television License, LLC)
- Sister stations: WTMJ-TV

History
- First air date: June 1, 1988
- Former call signs: WHKE (1988–1998)
- Former channel numbers: Analog: 55 (UHF, 1988–2009); Digital: 40 (UHF, 2002–2019)
- Former affiliations: LeSEA (1988–1995); inTV (1995–1998)
- Call sign meaning: Pax Milwaukee

Technical information
- Licensing authority: FCC
- Facility ID: 37104
- ERP: 800 kW
- HAAT: 316 m (1,037 ft)
- Transmitter coordinates: 43°5′26″N 87°53′50″W

Links
- Public license information: Public file; LMS
- Website: iontelevision.com

WPXE-TV (channel 55) is a television station licensed to Kenosha, Wisconsin, United States, broadcasting the Ion Television network to the Milwaukee area. It is owned by the Ion Media subsidiary of the E. W. Scripps Company alongside NBC affiliate WTMJ-TV (channel 4), with engineering and some master control operations run out of WTMJ-TV's Radio City facility on East Capitol Drive in Milwaukee. WPXE's transmitter is located on the WITI TV Tower in nearby Shorewood, Wisconsin.

== History ==
WPXE's first generation Ion Television logo, used almost exclusively on local productions. (2007–2008)

The station first signed on the air on June 1, 1988, as WHKE (for "World Harvest Kenosha Evangelism"), operating as a religious station; it was originally owned by LeSEA Broadcasting. The station's original transmitter was located in Kenosha, just north of the Illinois–Wisconsin state line (the tower remains in use for the transmitter of radio station WWDV, 96.9 FM). Paxson Communications purchased the station in 1995 and turned it into an all-infomercial format as part of the Infomall TV Network (inTV), though it also aired the daily greyhound racing recap program from Kenosha's Dairyland Greyhound Park for many years after WVTV (channel 18) stopped carrying that show in 1996, which met the station's local programming requirements.

Former WPXE analog transmitter site in Racine County. The tower on the left continues to be the WVTY tower.

In the late 1990s after its purchase by Paxson, WHKE moved its transmitter to a tower in northern Racine County (near I-94) which was shared with WEZY (92.1 FM; now WVTY, which continues to use the tower). Despite the reason for the transmitter move being to serve more of the Milwaukee market, the southerly location and short tower height limited the station's coverage area in southeastern Wisconsin, mainly to keep the channel 55 allocation open for an eventual new station in Wausau (which would be given to Wittenberg-licensed WFXS-DT in 1999), with WHKE relying on cable coverage in the northern part of the market that would not be realized until Paxson invoked must-carry status, a process that took several years. The station became a charter affiliate of Pax TV (now Ion) when it launched on August 31, 1998, at which time it changed its call letters to WPXE-TV.

At times during summer due to tropospheric propagation in the analog era, WHKE/WPXE would receive heavy interference a few times and even have its signal overwhelmed by that of another distant station on channel 55, WBNX-TV from Cleveland, which broadcast at a stronger power and had its signal brought over Lake Michigan into Wisconsin due to Lake Erie's heavy "trop effect" amplifying their signal across northern Indiana and lower Michigan.

Until 2021, the station's studios were located on North Flint Road, straddling the city line between Milwaukee and Glendale, and the same facility was also the studio for WTPX-TV, the Ion station in the Wausau market. In October of that year with the 2019 repeal of the Federal Communications Commission (FCC)'s Main Studio Rule, Ion Media officially registered its studio facility (along with most Ion-owned stations) as the Scripps Center in Cincinnati.

On September 24, 2020, it was announced that the Cincinnati-based E. W. Scripps Company, owner of NBC affiliate WTMJ-TV (channel 4), would purchase Ion Media for $2.65 billion, with financing from Berkshire Hathaway. With this purchase, Scripps divested 23 Ion-owned stations, with WPXE-TV kept and becoming a sister station to WTMJ-TV, as there were no regulatory complications within the Milwaukee market which prevented such a duopoly. The sale was completed on January 7, 2021.

== Programming ==
Typical Ion/Pax legal ID at the bottom of the screen taken from WPXE-TV.

The station had a past joint sales agreement (JSA) with WTMJ-TV under Journal ownership that resulted from that station's affiliated network, NBC, having a stake in Paxson Communications/Pax TV; this resulted in the two stations sharing programming (such as Martha Stewart Living and repeats of preseason Green Bay Packers games produced for WTMJ, and live games during the 2004 Summer Olympics, which aired on WPXE), WPXE airing repeats of WTMJ's evening newscasts for several years, and WTMJ selling advertising time for WPXE. This early agreement was discontinued on July 1, 2005, after Pax TV rebranded as i: Independent Television.

WPXE airs the entire Ion schedule and since the repeal of the Main Studio Rule, it carries the network without any local content outside of an hourly on-screen station identification. Beginning in 2024, WPXE resumed its role as the backup station for Packers preseason football in Olympic years (that year, carrying the team's Family Night scrimmage and the first preseason game in Cleveland against the Browns). Otherwise, the station is not currently used by WTMJ to carry preempted NBC and syndicated programming, and is unmentioned on WTMJ outside cross-promotions for Scripps Sports broadcasts guiding viewers to channel 55 and its cable/satellite positions.

== Technical information ==
=== Subchannels ===
The station's signal is multiplexed:

Subchannels of WPXE-TV
| Subchannel | Res. | Short name | Programming |
|---|---|---|---|
| 55.1 | 720p | ION | Ion Television |
| 55.2 | 720p | Bounce | Bounce TV |
| 55.3 | 480i | CourtTV | Court TV |
| 55.4 | 480i | DEFY | Defy |
| 55.5 | 480i | IONPlus | Ion Plus |
| 55.6 | 480i | BUSTED | Busted |
| 55.7 | 480i | GameSho | Game Show Central |
| 55.8 | 480i | QVC | QVC |

=== Analog-to-digital conversion ===
WPXE-TV shut down its analog signal, over UHF channel 55, on June 12, 2009, the official date on which full-power television stations in the United States transitioned from analog to digital broadcasts under federal mandate. The station's digital signal continued to broadcast on its pre-transition UHF channel 40, using virtual channel 55. When Qualcomm introduced its MediaFLO system to Chicago in 2008, WPXE-TV agreed to accept potential interference to 28.87% of the population within its Grade B contour resulting from the service, mostly occurring in fringe areas of Lake County, Illinois, which also received Ion service from Chicago sister station WCPX-TV. WPXE's digital signal and subchannels were not affected.

On February 2, 2009, the station converted its main digital signal to air high definition content in the 720p format, ahead of Ion's eventual launch of its high definition program schedule. After various tests, however, Ion decided to wait on a full transition and switched back to 480i in April 2009 due to its concerns about a seamless digital transition (as days before February 2, the national transition date was moved by Congress from February 17 to June 12). Full permanent HD service for WPXE launched on April 28, 2010, with the station also receiving HD cable coverage via digital channel 1015 on Time Warner Cable and digital channel 615 on Charter Communications.
