= WRJM (AM) =

Radio station in Greenfield, Wisconsin

Simulcasting WRJN Racine
- Greenfield, Wisconsin; United States
- Broadcast area: Milwaukee metropolitan area
- Frequency: 1290 kHz

Programming
- Format: Full service oldies
- Affiliations: NBC News Radio

Ownership
- Owner: Civic Media, Inc.
- Sister stations: WRJN; WAUK

History
- First air date: April 20, 1947 (as WMLO)
- Former call signs: WMLO (1947–1949); WMIL (1949–1972); WZUU (1972–1982); WLZZ (1982–1985); WZUU (1985–1986); WMVP (1986–1993); WMCS (1993–2013); WZTI (2013–2026)
- Call sign meaning: similar to WRJN

Technical information
- Licensing authority: FCC
- Facility ID: 63597
- Class: B
- Power: 5,000 watts
- Translator: 107.3 W297BY (Franklin)

Links
- Public license information: Public file; LMS
- Webcast: Listen live
- Website: wrjn.com

WRJM (1290 kHz) is a commercial AM radio station licensed to Greenfield, Wisconsin, United States, and serving the Milwaukee metropolitan area. Owned by Civic Media, Inc., it airs a simulcast of sister station WRJN, a full service oldies radio format, featuring hits from the 1960s and 1970s.

WRJM's transmitter power is 5,000 watts. To protect other stations on 1290 AM from interference, it uses a directional antenna with a four-tower array. The transmitter is off West Rawson Avenue in Franklin, near the Root River. Programming is also heard on translator station W297BY Franklin at 107.3 FM.

== History ==
=== ABC and CBS Radio ===
The station signed on the air on April 20, 1947, as WMLO. For its first 33 years, it was a daytimer station, required to go off the air at night. WMLO was an affiliate of the ABC Radio Network. It became WMIL in April 1949.

A sister station, WMIL-FM 95.7, was added in 1961. WMIL switched its affiliation to the CBS Radio Network on June 26, 1961. Its relationship with CBS Radio lasted until December 1963.

=== Country, Top 40 and oldies ===
WMIL-AM-FM were owned from 1968 to 1986 by Malrite Broadcasting. At first, the two stations simulcast a country music format as "Big M Country". In 1971, the FM station switched to beautiful music as "WMVM, Stereo Radio 95.7", with the slogan "Milwaukee's Voice of Music". Both stations flipped to Top 40 hits as WZUU and WZUU-FM (The Super Zoo) in 1972, initially consulted by Mike Joseph. In December 1979 while still a daytime only station, AM 1290 continued to simulcast the "Larry The Legend" morning show, but during other hours began an oldies format as Solid Gold 13Z.

In 1980, WZUU was granted a power increase from 1,000 watts days only to 5,000 watts day and night. The city of license was change to Greenfield, Wisconsin. In late 1982, it changed its call sign to WLZZ as "Solid Gold Wheels". WLZZ also ran a short lived country format beginning in late 1983, but returned to simulcasting WZUU-FM as WZUU after that.

The station was later sold to Amos Communications, who split WZUU away from WZUU-FM in January 1986 to run the "Heart and Soul" urban gold format from the Satellite Music Network and changed the call sign to WMVP. The station was sold to Willie Davis in 1988. In December 1993, WLUP (1000 AM) in Chicago purchased the WMVP call letters from Davis for a new sports radio format. At that point, 1290 AM became WMCS. The WMCS call sign stood for "Milwaukee's Community Station", to emphasize the station's heavy community involvement.

=== Talk sports, and blues ===
In 2004, WMCS flipped to a talk radio format. In December 2004, WMCS began airing sports shows from ESPN Radio after sunset, in partnership with daytime-only sports station WAUK (1510 AM) as "Milwaukee's ESPN Radio...1510 days, 1290 nights". The sports format later became home to play-by-play broadcasts for Marquette University men's college basketball and the AHL's Milwaukee Admirals via WAUK.

On January 22, 2008, Good Karma Broadcasting, owner of WAUK, purchased Christian radio station WRRD (540 AM) from Salem Communications. It moved WAUK's sports format to the full-time signal on February 12, casting doubt on the nighttime simulcast agreement with WMCS. On June 30, 2008, WMCS began airing its own content, consisting of blues and urban gospel programming, in addition to Al Sharpton's daily talk show.

=== Adult standards ===
On February 26, 2013, WMCS began stunting with Elvis Presley songs in preparation of a format flip. At 3 p.m. on March 1, the station debuted its new adult standards format as "1290 Martini Radio". It took a new call sign, WZTI.

On July 27, 2014, WZTI began to also air on the FM band on 100.3 FM, using FM translator station W262CJ, which broadcasts from the Shorewood tower farm on Milwaukee's northwest side and mainly covers the inner north portion of the Milwaukee metro area. The translator uses the HD2 channel of sister FM station WLDB to translate the signal to analog FM.

=== The Party ===
On November 1, 2014, WZTI dropped the adult standards format and began stunting with Christmas music, calling itself "100.3 The Elf". On December 25, 2014, at 5 p.m., after playing "Rockin' Around the Christmas Tree" by LeAnn Rimes, the station flipped to rhythmic oldies, branded as "The Party 100.3 FM & 1290 AM". The first song on "The Party" was "1999" by Prince.

=== Oldies ===
On August 25, 2015, at noon, after playing "Miss You Much" by Janet Jackson, "It's a Shame" by The Spinners and "The Party's Over" by Journey, WZTI shifted to oldies, branded as "Milwaukee's True Oldies 100.3 FM & 1290 AM". The first song on "True Oldies" was "Old Time Rock and Roll" by Bob Seger. The station began using programming from Scott Shannon's "True Oldies Channel".

On March 7, 2018, WZTI rebranded as "Fonz FM" (named after Happy Days character Arthur "The Fonz" Fonzarelli). It discontinued carrying programming from the True Oldies Channel, switching to its own locally programmed playlist.

On September 10, 2025, Milwaukee Radio Alliance announced they would sell WZTI, as well as FM translators W262CJ (100.3 FM) and W297BY (107.3 FM), to Madison-based Civic Media for $465,000. The sale was completed on March 23, 2026.

On September 17, 2025, WZTI began to simulcast Civic's own full-service oldies station WRJN from Racine. The call sign was changed to WRJM on April 13, 2026.

=== WAWA 1590 ===
Prior to its purchase of WMCS in 1988, All-Pro Broadcasting owned WAWA (1590 AM), a 1,000-watt daytime-only directional AM station licensed to West Allis, Wisconsin. WAWA had signed on in 1961. It aired an R&B format that was popular with Milwaukee's African-American community, and was a rival to WNOV during the 1960s and 1970s.

The station also simulcast part-time with FM sister station 102.1 FM, beginning when 1590's owner Suburbanaire Inc. bought the 102.1 frequency (then WMKE) in 1964. The FM station then became WAWA-FM until 1979, when it was then changed by new owner Willie Davis to WLUM. Later, in 1987 the WAWA call sign was also changed to WLUM. When All-Pro purchased the stronger 1290 frequency in 1988, the company signed off WLUM (1590 AM) and returned the station's license to the Federal Communications Commission.

== FM translator ==
WRJM also broadcast on the following translator:

Broadcast translator for WRJM
Call sign	Frequency	City of license	FID	ERP (W)	Class	Transmitter coordinates	FCC info
W297BY	107.3 FM	Franklin, Wisconsin	150179	250	D	42°51′20.1″N 87°50′41.3″W	LMS
