= WOKY =

- Milwaukee, Wisconsin; United States
- Broadcast area: Milwaukee metropolitan area
- Frequency: 920 kHz
- Branding: Fox Sports 920

Programming
- Format: Sports
- Affiliations: Fox Sports Radio; Milwaukee Admirals; Wisconsin Badgers; Motor Racing Network; Performance Racing Network; IndyCar Radio Network

Ownership
- Owner: iHeartMedia, Inc.; (iHM Licenses, LLC)
- Sister stations: WISN; WKKV-FM; WMIL-FM; WRIT-FM; WRNW

History
- First air date: August 31, 1947
- Former call signs: WEXT (1947–1950)
- Former frequencies: 1430 kHz (1947–1950)
- Call sign meaning: Mil-WOKY, phonetically pronounced like Milwaukee

Technical information
- Licensing authority: FCC
- Facility ID: 63917
- Class: B
- Power: 5,000 watts (day); 1,000 watts (night)
- Transmitter coordinates: 42°58′32.05″N 88°3′56.32″W

Links
- Public license information: Public file; LMS
- Webcast: Listen live (via iHeartRadio)
- Website: fsr920.iheart.com

WOKY (920 kHz, "Fox Sports 920") is a commercial AM radio station in Milwaukee, Wisconsin, owned by iHeartMedia, Inc. The station airs a sports radio format, featuring programs from Fox Sports Radio, including Dan Patrick and Colin Cowherd. WOKY's studios and offices, which became the home of all iHeart Milwaukee stations in 2000 after a building expansion, are on West Howard Avenue in Greenfield.

By day, WOKY is powered at 5,000 watts. To protect other stations on 920 AM from interference, it reduces power at night to 1,000 watts. It uses a directional antenna with a four-tower array. The transmitter site is behind the studios in Greenfield. WOKY broadcasts using HD Radio technology.

== History ==
=== WEXT ===
The history of WOKY can be traced back to WEXT, a 1,000-watt daytimer radio station at 1430 kHz in Milwaukee. It was founded by what would become the Bartell Group: Lee, David, Gerald, and Rosa Bartell (later Evans) which began operations on August 31, 1947. WEXT, the Milwaukee market's fifth radio station, did fairly well with a broadcast schedule that included popular music and ethnic programming, including a polka music show hosted by local radio legend John Reddy. Gerald Bartell and Rosa Bartell met Ralph Evans II while the three worked at the student radio station of the University of Wisconsin–Madison. Gerald and Rosa worked on programming and Evans was an electrical engineering student.

In the wake of WEXT's success, the Bartell family applied for full-time broadcast operations, and the result was a move down the dial to AM 920 in September 1950 and a new call sign, WOKY. (Note: The 1430 frequency was reassigned in 1951 to WBEV in Beaver Dam, Wisconsin, 50 miles (80 km) northwest of Milwaukee.) WOKY initially aired a full-service variety format similar to WEXT's, including popular music shows and programs oriented toward housewives and children.

=== Top 40 WOKY ===
Over time, contemporary music became the primary component of WOKY's schedule, with disc jockeys choosing the songs they played based on the Billboard and Cash Box best-seller charts and on local record sales. WOKY soon became Milwaukee's second Top 40 music station after WRIT (now WJOI).

WOKY served as the city's premier Top 40 station during most of the 1960s and 1970s. It was known for much of that time as the "Mighty 92". Along with Chicago Top 40 giants WLS and WCFL, the Mighty 92 was also a favorite of teenagers in Western Michigan who picked up the signal from across Lake Michigan.

Popular disc jockeys on WOKY, during the Top 40 years, included Bob White, "Mad Man" Michaels, "Lucky" Logan, Mitch Michael, Sam Hale, Ron Riley (later with WLS Chicago), Bob Barry, Carl Como, Paul Christy, Michael Lee Scott, Jim Brown, Pat McKay, Jack McCoy, Ronnie Knight, Johnny Dark, Craig Roberts, Jack Lee, Robb Edwards, Gary Price, Gene Johnson, Jon "Rock 'n Roll" Anthony, Big Ron O'Brien, Barney Pip (later with WCFL Chicago) and Bob Collins (later with Chicago's full-service giant WGN). A popular station catchphrase during the early 1970s was "WOKY Plays Favorites". WOKY is also noteworthy for being the first station in Milwaukee to broadcast traffic reports from a helicopter, courtesy of air personality Art Zander and his feature "The Safer Route".

=== Adult standards and oldies ===
As FM stations became the choice for radio listeners looking for contemporary music, WOKY shifted to an adult standards format in early-1982. It became a full-time affiliate of Al Ham's Music of Your Life format, based in Connecticut.

To keep up with demographic trends, WOKY tweaked the format over the years, gradually shifting to a middle of the road-oldies hybrid that mixed 1950s–1970s pop hits with classic and current adult contemporary music, with artists such as Frank Sinatra, Neil Diamond and The Carpenters being mainstays of the format. Starting in 2005, WOKY began programming oldies all day on Fridays, complete with the station's old jingles and other elements. For many years, WOKY was a success in the ratings, though many of its listeners were older than the demographics that many advertisers actively seek. Starting in 1993, the station was known for pioneering marathons of Christmas music beginning on Thanksgiving Day and continuing through the holiday season.

In 1997, WOKY and co-owned WMIL-FM were bought for $40 million by Clear Channel Communications, the forerunner of iHeartMedia.

WOKY was briefly the Milwaukee outlet for Delilah in a burn off move after sister station WLTQ (now WRNW) converted to a classic rock format (Delilah was later heard in Milwaukee on WMYX-FM). WOKY also carried Milwaukee Panthers basketball game broadcasts from 2003 to 2007 when the team moved to WISN. The University of Wisconsin-Milwaukee women's basketball games can be heard on WOKY.

On January 2, 2007, after concluding its Christmas holiday programming, WOKY came back with a new approach: an oldies format emphasizing hit songs from the 1960s and 1970s. The "Mighty 92" name returned full-time, as did many of the classic jingles the station played in its Top 40 heyday. On nights and weekends, the station used Unistar's satellite-delivered "Oldies Channel" (now Kool Gold from Westwood One). With the new format, WOKY did not flip to all-Christmas music in 2007. Instead, like sister station WRIT-FM, WOKY played a few Christmas tunes every hour.

=== Classic country ===
On September 18, 2008, after playing "Hello, Goodbye" by The Beatles, the station changed to classic country music as "The Wolf". The format was already being heard on sister station 106.1 WMIL-FM's HD Radio subchannel. The subchannel version had been automated but when it debuted on AM 920, it featured several of WOKY's airstaff. The Wolf was sub-branded as MIL-WOKY, Milwaukee's Country Connection.

On December 1, 2011, the station announced it would become the Milwaukee home of NASCAR radio coverage from all three NASCAR radio networks and the Indianapolis Motor Speedway Radio Network for the Indianapolis 500 and Brickyard 400. NASCAR moved to WOKY from ESPN Radio outlet WAUK, which days before announced the removal of all auto racing programming to focus on solely on traditional sports. In September 2012, WOKY also added nationally broadcast college football and NFL from Westwood One, including the NFL on Westwood One.

=== All-sports ===
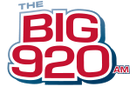
Logo as "The Big 920"

On January 2, 2013, Clear Channel Milwaukee announced that WOKY would drop classic country and adopt a sports radio format on January 7. (In reality the branding launched on January 5 during the station's broadcasts of Wild Card Weekend games from Dial Global.) Branded as "The Big 920," the new WOKY schedule became a near-simulcast of its Madison sister station, WTSO ("The Big 1070"), featuring Wisconsin-based local sports shows hosted by Brian Posick, Mike Heller, Matt Lepay and Mike Lucas. Also heard were national shows featuring Jay Mohr, The Dan Patrick Show, and NBC Sports Radio, along with live event broadcasts that have been airing previously on WOKY, notably football, NASCAR, and the Milwaukee Panthers. The move made WOKY the third English-language all-sports station in the Milwaukee market, joining WAUK, WSSP, along with news/talk-formatted WTMJ's commitment to evening sports talk and play by play coverage of Milwaukee Brewers baseball and Green Bay Packers football.

On December 2, 2013, Learfield Sports and the University of Wisconsin–Madison announced that WOKY would become the Milwaukee station for Wisconsin Badgers broadcasts, replacing longtime affiliate WTMJ, effectively making the team exclusive to iHeartMedia in the two largest cities in Wisconsin, with iHeart's WIBA-AM-FM in Madison acting as the flagship stations of the Badgers. As part of the deal, WOKY will air all Badgers sports broadcasts. Football and men's basketball are simulcast with WRIT-FM due to WOKY's weak nighttime signal.

In 2018, Milwaukee got two FM sports stations. On November 1, WKTI (94.5 FM), owned by Good Karma Brands, became "ESPN 94.5 Milwaukee." Four weeks later on November 27, iHeart flipped WRNW from Top 40 to sports radio as 97.3 The Game. All of WOKY's local programming was moved to 97.3 FM, with 920 AM mostly carrying Fox Sports Radio's daily lineup.

In 2018, WOKY acquired the rights to the Milwaukee Admirals. The team had previously been heard on sports talk rival WSSP 1250 AM (then known as “105.7 The Fan”).

The station became known as "Fox Sports 920" on November 18, 2024, as the station dropped its remaining local programming from WTSO for all-national content.

In January 2026, WOKY began a local show featuring former WRNW hosts Drew Olson, Bill Schmid, and Armen Saryan. In April 2026, a local Milwaukee Brewers pregame show hosted by Hunter Baumgardt was added to the local lineup. In August 2026, it was announced that starting with the 2026 season, Green Bay Packers games would also air on WOKY, along with sister station WRIT-FM. As of 2026, veteran Wisconsin sportscaster Doug Russell was serving as WOKY's program director.

== See also ==
- Bartell Group
