= WTPX-TV =

Television station in Antigo, Wisconsin

- Antigo–Wausau–Rhinelander, Wisconsin; United States
- City: Antigo, Wisconsin
- Channels: Digital: 19 (UHF); Virtual: 46

Programming
- Affiliations: 46.1: Ion Television; for others, see § Subchannels

Ownership
- Owner: Ion Media; (Ion Television License, LLC)
- Sister stations: WPXE-TV (network sister); WTMJ-TV, WGBA-TV, WACY-TV (adjacent market corporate sisters)

History
- Founded: May 15, 1998
- First air date: November 23, 2001
- Former call signs: WAZW (1998–1999); WTPX (1999–2009)
- Former channel numbers: Digital: 46 (UHF, 2002–2018)
- Call sign meaning: Network's former name, Pax TV, transposed

Technical information
- Licensing authority: FCC
- Facility ID: 86496
- ERP: 24.5 kW
- HAAT: 279 m (915 ft)
- Transmitter coordinates: 45°3′33″N 89°26′10″W

Links
- Public license information: Public file; LMS
- Website: iontelevision.com

WTPX-TV (channel 46) is a television station licensed to Antigo, Wisconsin, United States, broadcasting the Ion Television network to the Wausau–Rhinelander market. Owned by the Ion Media subsidiary of the E. W. Scripps Company, the station maintains transmitter facilities near Glandon, Wisconsin.

Until 2021, the station's public file was maintained at studios on North Flint Road in Glendale, where WPXE-TV, the Ion station in the Milwaukee market, was based. In October of that year with the 2019 repeal of the Federal Communications Commission (FCC)'s Main Studio Rule, Ion Media officially registered its studio facility (along with most Ion-owned stations) as the Scripps Center in Cincinnati. The same month, Green Bay sister station WGBA-TV launched Ion as its fifth subchannel, with the affiliation moving from WBAY-TV.

== Subchannels ==
The station's signal is multiplexed:

Subchannels of WTPX-TV
Subchannel	Res.	Short name	Programming
46.1	720p	ION	Ion Television
46.2	480i	Grit	Grit
46.3	480i	Mystery	Ion Mystery
46.4	480i	Laff	Laff
46.5	480i	Bounce	Bounce TV
46.6	480i	IONPlus	Ion Plus
46.7	480i	BUSTED	Busted
46.8	480i	HSN	HSN
46.9	480i	QVC2	QVC2

Paxson Communications/Ion Media chose to run WTPX-TV as a digital-only station upon signing on in 2001, and held no analog license for the station. Thus, WTPX-TV never had any digital transition channel, flash-cut or analog transition period. It moved from its original physical channel 46 to channel 19 during the FCC's spectrum repack in June 2018, but continues to use channel 46 as its virtual channel position.
