= WMIL-FM =

- Waukesha, Wisconsin; United States
- Broadcast area: Greater Milwaukee; Southeast Wisconsin
- Frequency: 106.1 MHz (HD Radio)
- Branding: FM 106.1

Programming
- Format: Country
- Subchannels: HD2: TikTok Radio
- Affiliations: Premiere Networks

Ownership
- Owner: iHeartMedia, Inc.; (iHM Licenses, LLC)
- Sister stations: WISN, WKKV-FM, WOKY, WRIT-FM, WRNW

History
- First air date: January 1, 1962; 64 years ago
- Former call signs: WAUX-FM (1962–1965); WAUK-FM (1965–1975)
- Call sign meaning: Milwaukee

Technical information
- Licensing authority: FCC
- Facility ID: 63919
- Class: B
- ERP: 12,000 watts
- HAAT: 304 meters (997 ft)
- Transmitter coordinates: 43.096°N 87.904°W

Links
- Public license information: Public file; LMS
- Webcast: Listen live (via iHeartRadio)
- Website: fm106.iheart.com

WMIL-FM (106.1 MHz) is a commercial radio station licensed to Waukesha, Wisconsin, and serving the Greater Milwaukee and Southeast Wisconsin radio market. It carries a country music radio format and is owned by iHeartMedia, Inc. The studios and offices are on West Howard Avenue in the Milwaukee suburb of Greenfield.

WMIL-FM has an effective radiated power (ERP) of 12,000 watts. The transmitter site is in Milwaukee's North Side off Humboldt Boulevard near Estabrook Park and the Milwaukee River. WMIL-FM broadcasts in the HD Radio hybrid format. The HD2 digital subchannel airs iHeartRadio's "TikTok Radio" service.

== History ==
=== WAUX-FM, WAUK-FM ===
On January 1, 1962, the station signed on as WAUX-FM, the FM sister station to WAUX (1510 AM). The stations were owned by the Waukesha Broadcasting Company. At the time, WAUX-FM's effective radiated power was 3,800 watts, a fraction of its current output.

Because WAUX was a daytimer, the two stations simulcast during the day and programming continued on WAUX-FM at night. A few years later in 1965, they became WAUK and WAUK-FM respectively. During the 1970s, WAUK-FM aired a beautiful music format.

=== WMIL-FM ===
In December 1975, the station adopted the WMIL-FM call sign (originally used by 95.7 FM). Stebbins Communications acquired the two stations in 1975. For a time, WMIL-FM was dark when Stebbins went bankrupt. The AM station had already been sold to another company in 1977.

Charter Broadcasting, which already owned WOKY, purchased WMIL-FM in 1979. The company sold WOKY and WMIL-FM to Sundance Broadcasting in June 1983.

=== Country music ===
Shortly after the completion of the sale, the present country music format was launched on WMIL-FM, competing against rival WBCS (now active rock station WHQG). As a country station, WMIL-FM has long been successful in the local ratings. Clear Channel Communications, a forerunner to today's iHeartMedia, bought WMIL-FM and WOKY for $40 million in 1997.

In 2007, WMIL-FM was voted "Top Country Station in a Large Market". The station now competes with country stations in surrounding suburbs (WMBZ in West Bend and WVTY in Racine), but generally has outdone any competitors in Milwaukee proper since the mid-1980s.

== Programming ==
The station's local morning show is co-hosted by Scott Dolphin and Shannen Oestereich (Scott & Shannen) with Shanna "Quinn" Hoy heard in afternoon drive time. Other shifts are voicetracked by iHeart country DJs including Billy Greenwood in middays and Ric Rush evenings.

Syndicated programming from co-owned Premiere Networks includes After Midnite With Granger Smith in overnights, a weekly "best-of" compilation of the weekday morning The Bobby Bones Show on Sunday evenings (to maintain rights over the program in the Milwaukee market) and The Country House Party on Saturday evenings.
