= Racine Journal Times =

Newspaper in Racine, Wisconsin

The Journal Times
- Type: Daily newspaper
- Owner: Lee Enterprises
- Editor: Mike Boyd
- Founded: 1852 (as Racine Weekly Journal)
- Language: English
- Headquarters: 212 4th Street, Racine, WI 53403
- Circulation: 14,749 Daily; 15,915 Sunday (as of 2023)
- Website: journaltimes.com

The Journal Times (known before 1972 as The Racine Journal-Times) is a daily newspaper published in Racine, Wisconsin, serving Racine County. The newspaper is owned by Lee Enterprises.

== History ==
The Journal Times traces its roots to the 1852 foundation of the Racine Weekly Journal, which became a daily in 1856. The Journal was sold during the American Civil War to former state senator and commanding officer of the 22nd Wisconsin Volunteer Infantry (the "Abolition Regiment") William L. Utley. Utley and his family published the paper for some time, but by 1875 had sold it to Frank Starbuck, son of the publisher of The Times of Cincinnati, who had been serving as co-publisher since 1873.

In 1912, the name was changed to the Racine Journal News. The newspaper's former radio station, WRJN, was founded in December 1926. Starbuck died in 1929, his son, Frank R. Starbuck, became publisher, and in 1932 the paper merged with the Racine Times-Call, the other local daily, to become the Journal Times. The paper was sold to Lee Enterprises in 1968, and in 1972 officially changed its name to simply The Journal Times.

On July 14, 2019, The Journal Times shut down its press. The paper is now printed in Munster, Indiana.

The newspaper continues to publish daily newspapers, but in November 2025 ceased publishing print editions on Mondays, while still publishing e-editions online. This ended a 169-year tradition of daily print newspapers for the Racine population.
