= WISN (AM) =

- Milwaukee, Wisconsin; United States
- Broadcast area: Greater Milwaukee; Southeast Wisconsin
- Frequency: 1130 kHz
- Branding: News/Talk 1130 WISN

Programming
- Format: News/talk
- Network: Fox News Radio
- Affiliations: Premiere Networks; Westwood One; WITI

Ownership
- Owner: iHeartMedia, Inc.; (iHM Licenses, LLC)
- Sister stations: WKKV-FM, WMIL-FM, WOKY, WRIT-FM, WRNW

History
- First air date: October 23, 1922; 104 years ago
- Former call signs: WIAO (1922–1924); WSOE (1924–1928)
- Former frequencies: 1110 AM (1927–1928); 1120 AM (1928–1941); 1150 AM (1941–1965)
- Call sign meaning: The Wisconsin News (former Hearst owned daily newspaper later merged into The Milwaukee Sentinel)

Technical information
- Licensing authority: FCC
- Facility ID: 65695
- Class: B
- Power: 50,000 watts days; 10,000 watts nights
- Transmitter coordinates: 42°45′18.1″N 88°4′53.3″W
- Repeater: 97.3 WRNW-HD2 (Milwaukee)

Links
- Public license information: Public file; LMS
- Webcast: Listen live (via iHeartRadio)
- Website: newstalk1130.iheart.com

WISN (1130 kHz) is a commercial AM radio station in Milwaukee, Wisconsin. It broadcasts a news/talk radio format and is owned by iHeartMedia, Inc. The studios are on Howard Avenue in the Milwaukee suburb of Greenfield.

By day, WISN runs the maximum power for commercial AM stations, 50,000 watts. To protect other stations on 1130 AM, a clear channel frequency, it reduces power at night to 10,000 watts and uses a directional antenna at all times. Its nine-tower array is located at 21423 Bennett Road in Dover, off U.S. Route 41. WISN is also heard on the HD 2 digital subchannel of sister station WRNW (97.3 FM).

== Programming ==
WISN airs a mix of local hosts and syndicated conservative talk shows from Premiere Networks, a subsidiary of iHeartMedia. An hour of news, the Morning Briefing, starts off the weekday schedule, Jay Weber's local morning drive time show following it and leads into Benjamin Yount's mid-morning program. The Clay Travis and Buck Sexton Show is then carried live before leading into four hours of live afternoon local programming, with Vicki McKenna airing for one hour, followed by the Dan O' Donnel Show for three hours. Evenings feature The Sean Hannity Show, followed by The Mark Levin Show, both airing in tape delay, before Coast to Coast AM with George Noory is heard after midnight.

The weekend mainly features paid brokered programming, including local shows on money, health, the outdoors, real estate and home improvement. Syndicated weekend programs include The Kim Komando Show, At Home with Gary Sullivan, The Weekend with Michael Brown and Live on Sunday Night, It's Bill Cunningham. Most hours begin with an update from Fox News Radio.

== History ==
On July 22, 1922, a broadcasting license was issued jointly to the Milwaukee School of Engineering and the daily evening newspaper, The Wisconsin News, which was owned by the Hearst Corporation. The call letters, WIAO, were assigned sequentially with no special meaning. Since December 1, 1921, radio stations had been assigned two wavelengths: 360 meters (833 kHz) for "broadcasting news, concerts and such matter", and 485 meters (619 kHz) for "broadcasting crop reports and weather forecasts". As such, WIAO was licensed to broadcast on the frequency of 360 meters (833.3 kHz). Although its license called for "unlimited" time at a power of 500 watts, the fact that the three other Milwaukee stations: WAAK (Gimbel Brothers department store), WCAY (Kesselman O'Driscol Music Co.) and WHAD (Marquette University), were also licensed for the 360 meter band, meant that WIAO had to share time with them.

At 10:15 a.m. on October 23 of that year, WIAO signed on the air from the school's Marshall Street building. It was powered at 100 watts of power, using a student-built transmitter. That power level was formalized on January 9, 1923, when a new license was issued.

On July 23, 1923, another new license was issued — this time solely to the School of Engineering — specifying a power level of 200 watts. The power level was reduced to 100 watts on October 9.

=== WSOE ===
In January 1924, The Wisconsin News began programming the station on a part-time basis. On May 31, 1924, the station was authorized to shift its frequency to 246 meters (1220 kHz). The station did so at 5:30 p.m. on Monday, June 9. On August 18 of that year, WIAO changed its call letters to WSOE (standing for School of Engineering). On December 31, the school announced that it had purchased all of the equipment of WCBD in Zion, Illinois (one of the first religious stations for the city's Christ Community Church, which also preached "flat Earth" information). The purchase included a new, more powerful (500-watt) transmitter and twin towers, which were mounted atop the school's Oneida (now Wells) Street building. The new WSOE was dedicated on July 8, 1925. At that time, The Wisconsin News took over programming the station full-time, while the School of Engineering took care of technical operations. Formal approval of the power increase was issued on July 15.

The authorized power level was increased to 1,000 watts on April 21, 1927.

At 3:00 a.m. on June 15, 1927, the first of two major reassignments of radio frequencies made by the new Federal Radio Commission (FRC) took effect. The reassignment affected almost 600 of the nation's 694 radio stations. WSOE was shifted to a wavelength of 270 meters (1110 kHz).

The Journal Co. had programmed Marquette University's station, WHAD (which was unrelated to the current-day Delafield-licensed Wisconsin Public Radio outlet), since January 1925. It couldn't come to a satisfactory agreement with them on where to take the station, and at the suggestion of a Federal Radio Commissioner, decided to purchase another. On April 20, 1927, The Journal Co. purchased WKAF.

On June 1, 1927, WSOE was shifted to a frequency of 1110 kHz and its power reduced to 500 watts. WHAD was assigned to a wavelength of 293 meters (1020 kHz), and ordered to share time with WKAF until the Journal Co. took over the latter station, at which time WHAD would be moved to another frequency. That happened on July 25, 1927, and the call letters were changed to WTMJ.

As a result, WHAD was shifted to 270 meters (1110 kHz) on September 15, and ordered to share time with WSOE. On October 15, WSOE's power was cut to 250 watts.

To compete with WTMJ, The Wisconsin News entered into a lease arrangement with the School of Engineering on November 15, 1927. The lease was for a minimum of three years. The agreement specified that the newspaper was to "operate the station and furnish all financial support while its ownership and technical supervision was to remain in the hands of the school." Subsequent license applications filed on January 11 and 12 were filed in the name of the School of Engineering and The Wisconsin News, respectively.

=== WISN ===
To reflect the new arrangement, The Wisconsin News changed the call sign from WSOE to WISN on January 23, 1928.

With the issuance of its General Order 40 on August 30, 1928, the FRC assigned WISN a new wavelength of 267 meters (1120 kHz) at 250 watts of power. The new assignment took effect on November 11. It was also ordered to share time with WHAD, with WISN receiving six-sevenths of the available time, and WHAD one-seventh. The studios, transmitter and towers were still located at the School of Engineering. WHAD had objected to the time-share arrangement with WISN, but its request to shift to 900 kHz was denied by the FRC on October 22.

WISN applied for permission to increase its power to 1,000 watts on July 29, 1930, and it was granted by the FRC on September 12. The station was sold to The Wisconsin News in November of that year.

The station continued to be located at the School of Engineering until 1932. That year, the School of Engineering reorganized itself as a non-profit corporation, and changed its name to the Milwaukee School of Engineering (MSOE). It moved from the Oneida Street building after purchasing the German-English Academy on North Broadway Street. Hearst also owned the morning newspaper, The Milwaukee Sentinel, and the WISN station offices and studios were relocated to its building on Michigan Street. The transmitter and tower were relocated to the top of the Milwaukee Electric Railway & Light Co.'s Public Service Building, and the newspaper took over operational responsibility for WISN.

WHAD applied for 900 kHz again in 1929, under the understanding that it would share time with WLBL. Its application was denied as WHAD and WLBL had entered into a time sharing agreement. WHAD appealed to the United States District Court of Appeals, which subsequently upheld the FRC's decision. It subsequently tried to negotiate a better time-sharing agreement with WISN. The latter interpreted the 1/7 requirement to be one day, while WHAD interpreted it as divided over a week. On November 12, 1931, a hearing was held to decide the matter, and as a result, in licenses issued to the two stations effective on February 19, 1932, specified definite hours for the operation of each.

The Wisconsin News purchased WHAD from Marquette University in 1934, and on May 29, WHAD was deleted and WISN was able to broadcast seven days a week. In 1937, The Wisconsin News became The Milwaukee News, though the newspaper folded in 1939. WISN then became The Milwaukee Sentinel station, but the call letters were not changed.

The Federal Communications Commission (FCC) shifted WISN to 1150 kHz in 1941 as a part of the North American Regional Broadcasting Agreement (NARBA Havana Treaty). The station shifted to its current frequency of 1130 kHz on March 11, 1965, at which time its power was increased from 5,000 watts into four towers to its current 50,000 watts days, 10,000 watts nights into nine towers. The stated purpose of this change was "bragging rights" as the highest-powered AM station in the entire state. (A Madison station formerly had "bragging rights" with 10,000 watts days and 5,000 watts nights into six towers). A further increase from 10,000 watts to 25,000 watts, nights, and the associated additional land and three additional towers, for a total of twelve towers, nights, was approved, but was never built, and the construction permit was subsequently canceled.

=== The Hearst era ===
The Hearst Corporation later purchased WISN, and in 1955, acquired a recently signed-on television station, WTVW (channel 12), which changed its call letters to match the radio station. Unlike WISN radio, which was a network affiliate of CBS Radio, WISN-TV was an affiliate of ABC and DuMont. On February 1, 1956, WISN radio affiliated with the ABC Radio Network, aligning both radio and television properties with one network. CBS placed advertisements in Milwaukee newspapers advising listeners to tune to WBBM in Chicago to hear their favorite CBS radio network programs.

In 1958, the station reacted to growing backlash of listeners and advertisers against the growing popularity of rock and roll, heard on other stations. It declared itself to be "non-rock, anti-Top 40", marking it one of the oldest temporary formats in radio history. To mark the event, the station played five hours of rock music, then burned the records in the station's courtyard.

In 1961, WISN-TV affiliated with CBS Television, while WISN radio stayed an ABC affiliate. That same year, Hearst signed on a sister FM station, 97.3 WISN-FM. (This was the second time WISN had an FM sister station. In 1949, it put WISN-FM on 102.9 MHz. Few people in that era owned an FM receiver and the station was taken off the air.) At first, WISN-FM largely simulcast the AM programming, but by the late 1960s, had switched to beautiful music.

The Milwaukee Journal reported on February 9, 1962, that ABC radio was discussing a possible move to Milwaukee's unaffiliated WRIT (1340 AM). On August 11, 1962, the same newspaper reported that those negotiations did not result in ABC shifting to WRIT. The ABC radio network affiliation remained with WISN.

=== Switch to talk radio ===
WISN aired a full service adult contemporary format from the 1970s until the 1980s. Over that decade, it added more talk programming at night. Then on August 19, 1987, it dropped all remaining music shows and changed to its current news/talk format.

In 1981 and 1982, WISN gained the rights to air Milwaukee Brewers games (and consequently, the team's current only World Series season); these were the only two (out of three, as WEMP aired games in the team's first year in 1970) years that WTMJ did not carry the team's games.

=== Sale to Clear Channel ===
In 1997, in the wake of the passage of the Telecommunications Act of 1996, Hearst decided to expand its television holdings (creating Hearst-Argyle Television), and sold its radio stations except for two in Baltimore. San Antonio-based Clear Channel Communications bought WISN radio, along with sister station WLTQ-FM the next year. Despite separate ownership, the radio stations continued to share studios with WISN-TV at N. 19th Street and Wells Street until 2000, when all five Milwaukee Clear Channel stations moved into WOKY's expanded facility on Howard Avenue in Greenfield.

WISN became the home for University of Wisconsin-Milwaukee Panthers men's basketball broadcasts in 2007–08. The station was the home of Marquette University Golden Eagles men's basketball broadcasts from 1971 to 2006 before opting not to renew its contract.

In 2007 the station ended its affiliation with ABC Radio and switched to the Fox News Radio network for national reporting and newscasts, along with most Clear Channel-owned AM stations. The ABC News Radio affiliation moved to WTMJ.

On July 27, 2009, the last remaining link between WISN radio and WISN-TV was severed, when Clear Channel signed an agreement with WITI (channel 6) to provide local news and weather content on its area stations. This ended a longtime agreement dating back to the Clear Channel sale for Weather Watch 12 to provide forecasts to the six stations in Clear Channel's Milwaukee cluster.

At the start of August 2012, WISN's programming began to air on the HD2 subchannel of FM sister station WRNW, returning in some form 1130's programming to the former WISN-FM for the first time since FCC action forced broadcasters to end simulcasts of the same programming on their AM and FM signals. WRNW continues as a tenant on the WISN-TV tower, the only remaining link of the television station to its former radio sisters. In 2014, Clear Channel Communications changed its name to iHeartMedia.

== Controversy ==
On August 21, 2024, WISN employee Weber used his platform on X to describe Gus Walz, a minor child with special needs and son of vice presidential candidate Tim Walz, as a "blubbering little bitch" because of his emotional response to his father's nomination at the Democratic National Convention. The comment generated a significant negative public reaction for WISN, which responded by suspending Weber for two weeks. As of January 2025, WISN continues to employ Weber.
