= WKTI =

ESPN Radio affiliate in Milwaukee

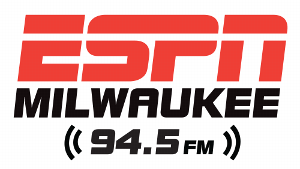
- Milwaukee, Wisconsin; United States
- Broadcast area: Milwaukee metropolitan area
- Frequency: 94.5 MHz (HD Radio)
- Branding: 94.5 ESPN

Programming
- Format: Sports
- Subchannels: HD2: Talk (WTMJ)
- Affiliations: ESPN Radio

Ownership
- Owner: Good Karma Sports; (Good Karma Broadcasting, L.L.C.)
- Sister stations: WGKB; WTMJ

History
- First air date: June 1, 1959
- Former call signs: WTMJ-FM (1959–1974); WKTI-FM (1974–2008); WLWK-FM (2008–2015); WKTI-FM (2015)
- Call sign meaning: Former "I-94" branding

Technical information
- Licensing authority: FCC
- Facility ID: 74095
- Class: B
- ERP: 14,000 watts
- HAAT: 291 meters (955 ft)
- Transmitter coordinates: 43.091°N 87.902°W

Links
- Public license information: Public file; LMS
- Webcast: Listen live
- Website: espn.com/milwaukee/

WKTI (94.5 FM, "ESPN Milwaukee") is a commercial radio station licensed to Milwaukee, Wisconsin, United States, serving the Milwaukee metropolitan area. Owned by Good Karma Sports, WKTI carries a sports format is an affiliate for ESPN Radio, the flagship for the Marquette Golden Eagles and the radio home of Mark Chmura, Mark Tauscher, Tony Smith and Steve True. WKTI shares its transmitter and tower facility with WTMJ-TV from its former studio located off of Capitol Drive (Wisconsin Highway 190) in Milwaukee, an Art Deco facility known as "Radio City", in tribute to the New York complex of the same name. WTMJ radio, WKTI and WGKB moved to a new studio within the Third Street Market Hall in downtown Milwaukee at the end of 2022.

In addition to a standard analog transmission, WKTI broadcasts in HD Radio and rebroadcasts WTMJ on its second subchannel.

== History ==
=== Earlier stations (1922–1950) ===
The owner of the Milwaukee Journal, in addition to publishing a daily newspaper, was a pioneer of broadcasting. It acquired WTMJ in 1927, after it had been on the air since 1922, among the earliest AM radio stations in Wisconsin. On February 23, 1940, an experimental FM station, W9XAO, started broadcasting in the Apex radio band (roughly between 25 and 44 MHz), as the first FM station west of the Allegheny mountains. In May 1940, the Federal Communications Commission (FCC) announced the establishment, effective January 1, 1941, of an FM band operating on 40 channels spanning 42–50 MHz. The first fifteen commercial FM station construction permits were issued on October 31, 1940, including one to the Milwaukee Journal Company for 45.5 MHz, which was issued the call sign W55M. (Note: The initial call sign policy for commercial FM stations included an initial "W" for stations located east of the Mississippi River, followed by the last two digits of a station's frequency assignment, "55" in this case, and closing with a one or two character city identifier, which for Milwaukee stations was "M".) This facility had a 50 kW transmitter located in Richfield, Wisconsin, and primarily simulcast WTMJ's programming.

Effective November 1, 1943, the FCC modified its policy for FM call letters, and the station's call letters were changed to WMFM. The station call letters became WTMJ-FM on December 1, 1945. It began running classical music for some hours of the day; one of the announcers was WTMJ's Jonathan Green, who utilized a more sophisticated voice and name as J. Bradley Green for his work with the FM side. The company began to focus on its new television station, WTMJ-TV, which signed on in 1947. This original WTMJ-FM, along with co-owned WSAU-FM in Wausau, ended operations on April 2, 1950, with their licenses turned in to the FCC for cancellation.

=== Beautiful music (1959–1974) ===
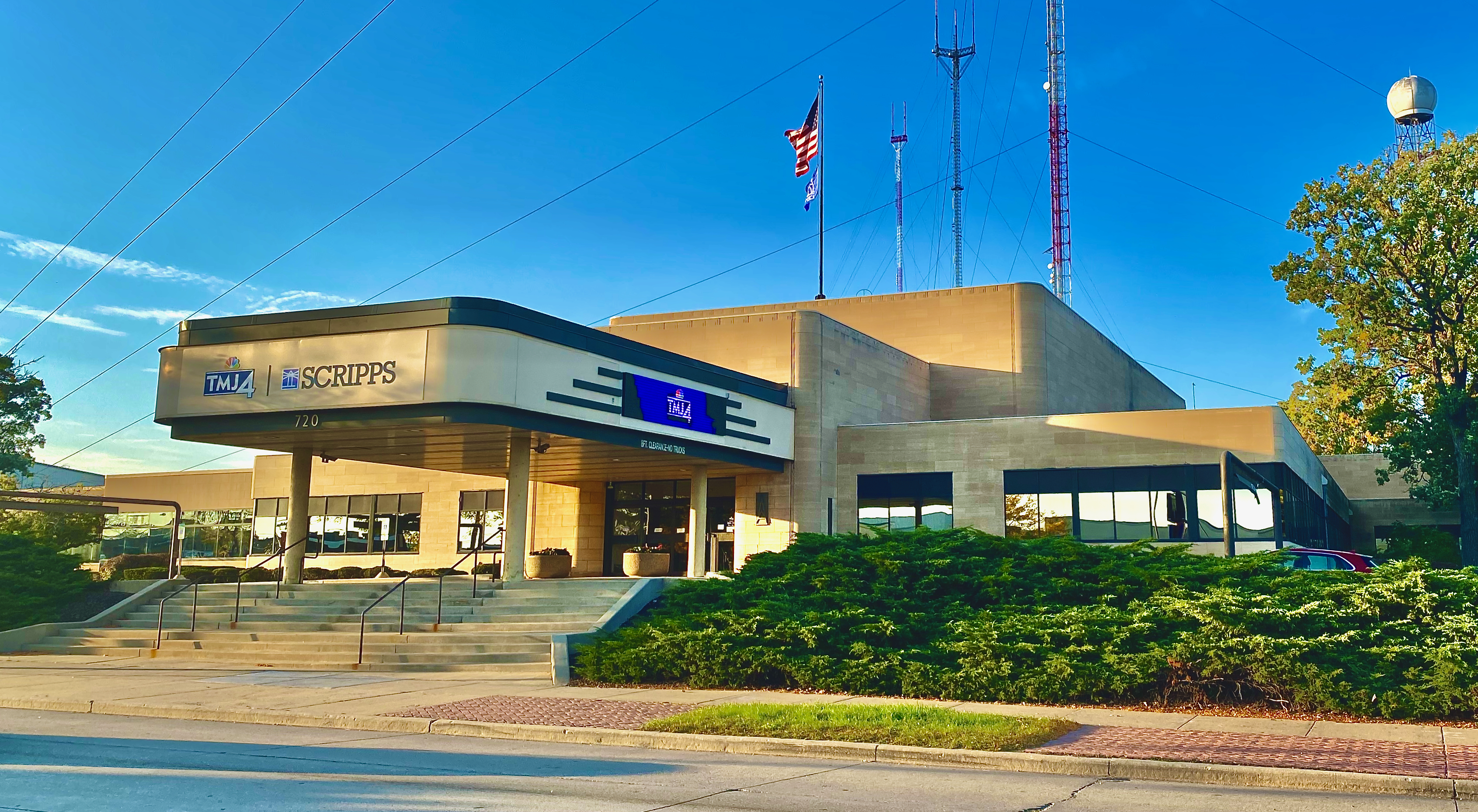
Radio City on Milwaukee's east side, which served as the studios for WTMJ-FM/WLWK/WKTI from 1942 until 2022.

A second WTMJ-FM, predecessor of WKTI, commenced operations on June 1, 1959, at 94.5 FM, and ran beautiful music programming for the next 15 years.

=== Top 40 (1974–1989) ===
In 1974, the station changed to a separately programmed automated Top 40 format, using the branding "I-94" (named after Interstate 94, the main east-west interstate highway that runs through Milwaukee). To support the new brand, the owner wanted to change the station's call sign but could not decide on the two middle letters of a new name. The station manager, Jack Lee, proposed "WWWI", but the airstaff was not comfortable about using the tongue-twisting call letters on-air. A sales manager suggested two letters from "Katie", his wife's name; the call sign was thus changed to WKTI. I-94 was an automated station promoted as "Nonstop Stereo Rock".

In 1981, live disc jockeys were employed. The next year, Bob Reitman began hosting WKTI's morning show. The program director, Dallas Cole, added Gene Mueller to the morning show in mid-1982. Lips LaBelle later became the afternoon DJ and promotions director. In late 1982, Danny Clayton became the night DJ and music director. These people worked as a team at WKTI for the next fifteen years. The station experienced steady ratings and growth.

=== Hot adult contemporary (1989–2008) ===
Between 1989 and 1990, WKTI gradually evolved to a hot adult contemporary format, as the station decided to target a more adult audience. This left WLUM-FM as the only CHR station in Milwaukee for a time. By around 1999, WXSS-FM began to compete for WKTI's predominantly female audience with music from younger artists. WKTI had a long-standing popular morning show, and the station did not make changes in response to the competition. However, slow adjustments were made to WKTI's playlist, changing to an adult top 40 format to attract new and younger listeners. The changes included contests and a Friday playlist called Flashback Friday, which featured music from the 1980s.

In September 2006, apart from the legal station identification, WKTI DJs no longer voiced the "W" in its call sign. The branding changed to 94-5 'KTI, Milwaukee's Hit Music Channel. In late 2006, Bob Reitman semi-retired, moving on to a weekly program on local public radio station WUWM. Gene Mueller continued the morning show with Amy Taylor and Gino Salamone as "Gene, Amy and Gino," until Taylor resigned in April 2007. On May 15, 2007, Gene Mueller left WKTI after 25 years to host WTMJ's "Wisconsin Morning News". A new show, Mathew Blades in the Morning, with Blades, Erin Austin, and AJ, was then launched on WKTI. The station's evening lineup was also changing. Cindy Huber hosted the evening program for two years, but then left the station in a reshuffle and moved to WLDB. The station then began carrying John Tesh's Intelligence for Your Life show.

In September 2008, WKTI broadcast play-by-play coverage for teams normally on WTMJ, while the AM station was carrying a different sport. For example, the Milwaukee Brewers Sunday broadcasts moved to WKTI to allow Green Bay Packers radio play-by-play to air on WTMJ. On September 28, 2008, for the first time in Milwaukee FM radio history, WKTI aired a Packers game (versus the Tampa Bay Buccaneers). On July 22, 2010, WLWK aired a Brewers game to allow WTMJ's coverage of a sudden flash flood emergency.

=== Adult hits (2008–2015) ===
At 12:12 p.m. on November 6, 2008, after playing "Damn, I Wish I Was Your Lover" by Sophie B. Hawkins and "Hello, Goodbye" by The Beatles, Journal Broadcast Group general manager Steve Wexler went on WKTI to introduce listeners to a complete makeover for 94.5 FM. The station launched a new adult hits format, branded as "The New 94.5 Lake FM" (in reference to Milwaukee's location on the western shoreline of Lake Michigan). Chicago's "Beginnings" was the first song to be broadcast. With the exception of Matthew Blades, the station's entire air staff was released with the change.

On November 13, 2008, WKTI officially changed call letters to WLWK-FM. Journal warehoused the WKTI call sign at a station it owned in Powell, Tennessee (serving the Knoxville market), until Journal's sale of the station to local interests in December 2012. The WKTI call sign then moved to the Sturgeon Bay/Door County channel 22 translator for WGBA-TV in Green Bay.

From July 8, 2009, to October 1, 2011, WTMJ-TV's third digital subchannel carried the music network TheCoolTV; this particular affiliation was co-branded with Lake FM as TheCoolTV, Hosted by 94-5 Lake FM. While it was intended to serve as the flagship for such an option with planned TheCoolTV affiliates as part of an agreement with Scripps, it would be the only affiliate to do so before the network's decision to end the Scripps deal and its subsequent gradual wind-down of operations. By 2012, WLWK slightly re-branded as "94.5 The Lake".

Journal Communications and the E. W. Scripps Company announced on July 30, 2014 that the two companies would merge to create a new broadcast company under the E.W. Scripps Company name. The two companies' broadcast properties would be combined, including WLWK-FM, WTMJ, and WTMJ-TV. The deal would separate WLWK from the Journal-Sentinel for the first time in its history, as the two companies' newspapers were to be spun off into a separate company under the Journal Media Group name. The transaction was completed on April 1, 2015.

=== Country (2015–2018) ===
WKTI logo as "94.5 KTI Country"

On May 29, 2015, at 9 a.m., after playing "Pinball Wizard" by The Who and going into a commercial break, WLWK began playing The Beatles' album "Abbey Road" in its entirety. An announcement followed the end of Side 1 from Scripps Milwaukee Radio's Vice President and General Manager Tom Langmyer thanking listeners of The Lake (and revealing the "Abbey Road" move was intended as a tribute to how the station launched) and notifying them about a forthcoming format change. Then, Side 2 was played, ending the "Lake" format with the final song on the album, "The End." At 10 a.m., WLWK flipped to country music, resurrecting the WKTI-FM call sign as "94.5 KTI Country", while the Sturgeon Bay translator for WGBA changed calls from WKTI-CD to WLWK-CD, effectively switching the calls. The FCC officially made the changes on June 8, 2015. (Note: The "FM" suffix was dropped a week later as the call letters became simply "WKTI".) The first song on the relaunched "KTI" was "Bartender" by Lady Antebellum.

The station became the second FM country outlet in Milwaukee with a full-power signal, taking on iHeartMedia's heritage country outlet WMIL-FM. It was WMIL's first head-to-head battle since 1987, when it pushed then-rival WBCS out of the format. In November 2017, after only two-and-a-half years, WKTI surpassed WMIL to become the radio market's top-rated country station with listeners 6+ according to the Nielsen Ratings. In December 2017, WKTI also beat WMIL-FM with listeners ages 25–54, and became the #2 station with listeners 18-34 among all radio stations in Milwaukee.

=== Sports (2018–present) ===
Logo when simulcasting with WAUK.

On July 27, 2018, Scripps announced the sale of WKTI and WTMJ to Good Karma Brands as part of its exit from radio broadcasting, becoming part of a cluster with WAUK. Good Karma then announced that, upon closure of the sale on November 1, WKTI would switch to a sports radio format, featuring programming from ESPN Radio; Good Karma also moved the operations of WAUK to Radio City, and continue to lease the existing WTMJ and WKTI studios and offices in the building from Scripps.

In anticipation of the flip, Racine-based WVTY flipped to country on October 30, 2018, imitating WKTI's previous logo and branding as 92.1 VTY Country; WVTY's owner Magnum Communications also purchased advertising time on WKTI through November 2 to promote WVTY and its other co-owned country station in the area, WMBZ in West Bend, under a more receptive arrangement with Good Karma. WVTY had flipped from country to an adult hits format in May 2015 in response to 94.5's format change to country, and used WLWK's former Lake branding until an objection from WKTI's Scripps management at the time led to a rebranding as The Shore.

WKTI initially operated as a simulcast of WAUK, but by June 4, 2019, WKTI shifted towards a mostly-local schedule, and WAUK became mostly a pass-through for the national ESPN Radio schedule.

==== Programming ====
Local weekday programming on WKTI includes: Jen, Gabe & Chewy hosted by Jen Lada, Gabe Neitzel, and former NFL player Mark Chmura in morning drive; Wilde and Tausch hosted by Jason Wilde and former NFL player Mark Tauscher in late mornings; Power Lunch with Greg Matzek and TBD hosted by Tony Smith & Bryan Dee, both in middays; Homer and Gabe hosted by Steve True and Gabe Neitzel in afternoon drive; and Doug Russell in early evenings.

Syndicated weekday programs include Golic and Wingo in morning drive, and various other ESPN Radio programs throughout the evening and overnight hours. WKTI also airs ESPN Radio's coverage of MLB, the NBA, the NFL, and NCAA football, and is the flagship station for the Marquette Golden Eagles college basketball teams.
