= WTMJ (AM) =

- Milwaukee, Wisconsin; United States
- Broadcast area: Greater Milwaukee
- Frequency: 620 kHz
- Branding: 620 WTMJ

Programming
- Format: Talk radio
- Affiliations: ABC News Radio; Compass Media Networks; Westwood One; Milwaukee Brewers Radio Network; Milwaukee Bucks Radio Network

Ownership
- Owner: Good Karma Sports; (Good Karma Broadcasting, L.L.C.)
- Sister stations: WGKB; WKTI

History
- First air date: May 15, 1922
- Former call signs: WCAY (1922–1925); WKAF (1925–1927)
- Former frequencies: 833 kHz (1922–1923); 833 & 485 kHz (1923); 1150 kHz (1923–1924); 1130 kHz (1924–1925); 1150 kHz (1925–1927); 1020 kHz (1927–1928)
- Call sign meaning: The Milwaukee Journal

Technical information
- Licensing authority: FCC
- Facility ID: 74096
- Class: B
- Power: 50,000 watts (day); 10,000 watts (night)
- Transmitter coordinates: 42°42′28.07″N 88°3′57.3″W
- Translator: 103.3 W277CV (Milwaukee)
- Repeater: 94.5 WKTI-HD2 (Milwaukee)

Links
- Public license information: Public file; LMS
- Webcast: Listen live
- Website: www.wtmj.com

WTMJ (620 AM) is a commercial radio station licensed to Milwaukee, Wisconsin, United States, featuring a talk radio format. Owned by Good Karma Sports, WTMJ's sign-on dates back to 1922 and for most of its history it was owned by The Milwaukee Journal newspaper. On weekdays, it airs news blocks during drive time, local talk shows in middays, sports in the evening and syndicated shows in late nights. It is the flagship station for Milwaukee Brewers baseball and Milwaukee Bucks basketball.

By day, it transmits 50,000 watts, the maximum for AM radio stations in the United States. At night, to avoid interference to other stations, it reduces power to 10,000 watts. In addition, it broadcasts on 250-watt FM translator W277CV at 103.3 MHz.

== History ==
=== WCAY and WKAF ===
The station was first licensed, with the sequentially assigned call sign WCAY, on May 15, 1922. It was owned by the Kesselman O'Driscoll Company, a music house located at 517–519 Grand Avenue (now Wisconsin Avenue) in Milwaukee. It was initially authorized to broadcast on the "entertainment" wavelength of 360 meters (833 kHz). On May 24, 1923, WCAY was reassigned to 1150 kHz. The next year ownership was transferred to the Milwaukee Civic Broadcasting Association.

The station license was briefly allowed to lapse in 1925, but it was quickly relicensed as WKAF to the WKAF Broadcasting Co., located at 130 Second Street. The station was now jointly owned by Kesselman-O'Driscoll Co., the Hotel Antlers (the studio location), and station engineer H. L. Ford. WKAF's first regular broadcast was held on October 20, 1925.

=== WTMJ ===
On April 20, 1927, WKAF was purchased by The Milwaukee Journal for $16,350. The Journal changed the call sign to WTMJ on May 10 to reflect the newspaper's name. Station facilities were upgraded, including the building of a new transmitter site in Brookfield, west of Milwaukee. The new WTMJ also affiliated with the NBC Red Network.

The Journal already had extensive experience with radio broadcasting. On May 1, 1922, it had sponsored the debut program on WAAK, Milwaukee's first radio station, which was owned by the local division of the Gimbel's department store chain. On January 24, 1925, the newspaper entered into an agreement as a joint, and dominant, partner in the operation of Marquette University's station, WHAD, which limited the university's programming to just one and one-half-hour on Friday evenings. The newspaper's operations at WHAD ended on August 15, 1927, with the university returning to full responsibility for the station. WTMJ aired a full service format featuring a mixture of music, news, talk and local personalities along with sports play-by-play, as well as dramas, comedies and other programs from NBC.

WTMJ made its debut broadcast on July 25, 1927. That day's broadcast featured music by the WTMJ Orchestra and included a remote broadcast featuring Bill Carlsen's orchestra. (Carlsen was later hired by WTMJ and went on to become Wisconsin's most widely known radio and television weather forecaster.) On September 11, 1927, WTMJ was assigned to 1020 kHz. WTMJ also began broadcasting University of Wisconsin Badgers football games that year.

=== AM 620 ===
On November 11, 1928, as part of a major nationwide allocation under the provisions of the Federal Radio Commission's General Order 40, WTMJ was reassigned to its current frequency of 620 kHz. In November 1929, WTMJ broadcast a Green Bay Packers game for the first time.

WTMJ was indirectly involved with the installation of the first directional antenna by a radio station in the United States. In 1929 a joint operation in Clearwater, Florida, WFLA-WSUN, was also assigned to 620 kHz. WTMJ immediately complained that at the initial power allocation the Florida stations were causing significant interference to WTMJ's coverage, especially at night. WFLA-WSUN turned to the engineering community to determine whether a then-theoretical concept of a directional antenna could be installed to reduce the Florida station's signal toward Milwaukee. This led to the successful development in 1932 of the first modern AM directional antenna system. (Note: WFLA moved to 970 kHz in 1941; WSUN then took sole possession of 620 kHz in Tampa Bay, eventually becoming WDAE.)

=== Radio City studios ===
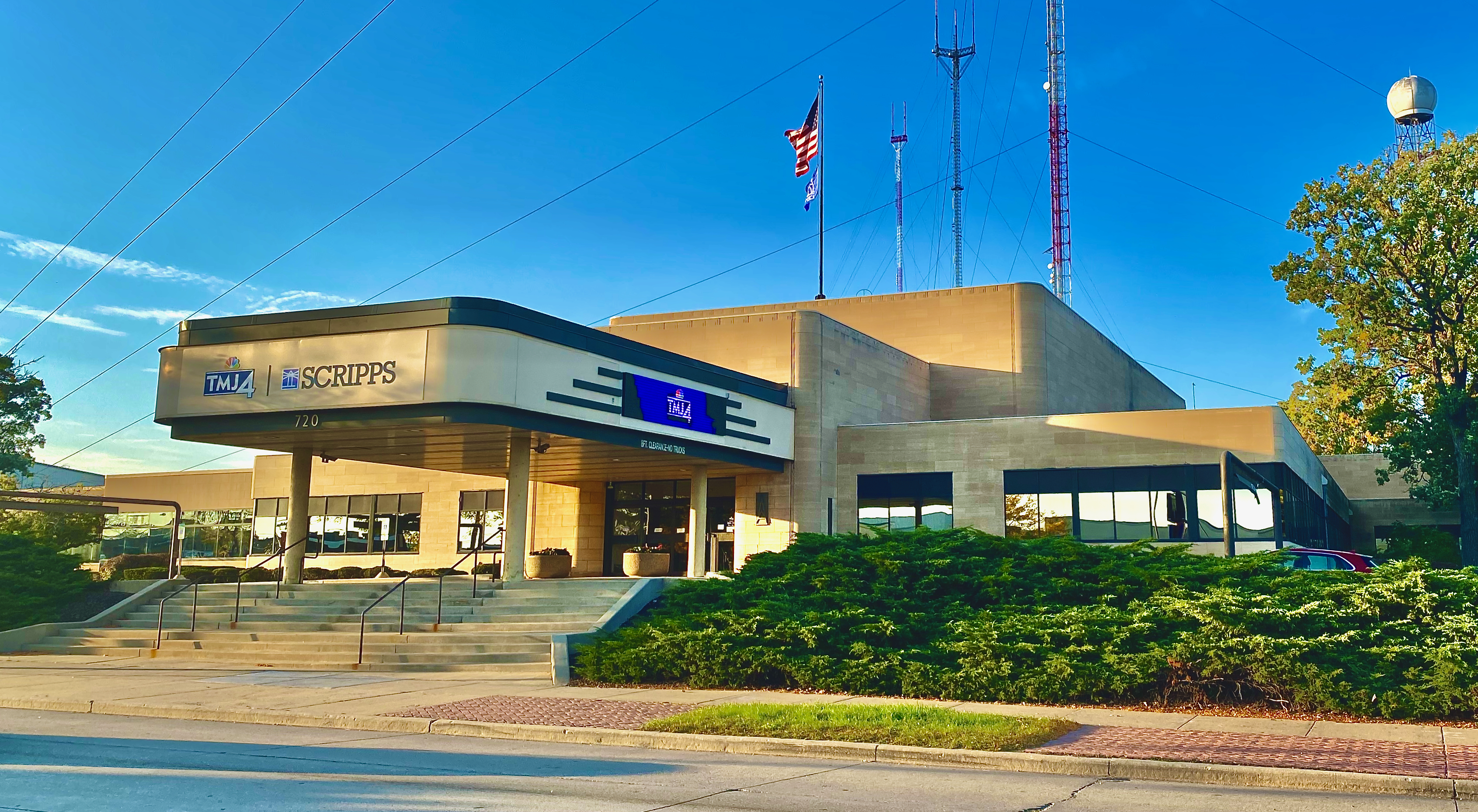
Radio City, the home of WTMJ radio from 1942 until 2022; the building remains in use by WTMJ-TV.

In 1942, a new facility, The Milwaukee Journal's Radio City, opened for WTMJ and its FM sister station, W55M (later WMFM and WTMJ-FM), in addition to the yet-to-come WTMJ-TV. An article in the trade magazine Broadcasting reported that the building was the "first ever designed to house all three types of broadcasting".

A 1944 survey by The Milwaukee Journal found WTMJ to be the most popular radio station in Milwaukee, especially for local morning show Top of the Morning and NBC radio's The Hour of Charm in evenings. WTMJ had gross advertising revenue of over $1.2 million. Gordon Hinkley began a near three-decade career with WTMJ in 1951, starting as a staff announcer and host of the Sunday morning beautiful music show Invitation to Beauty.

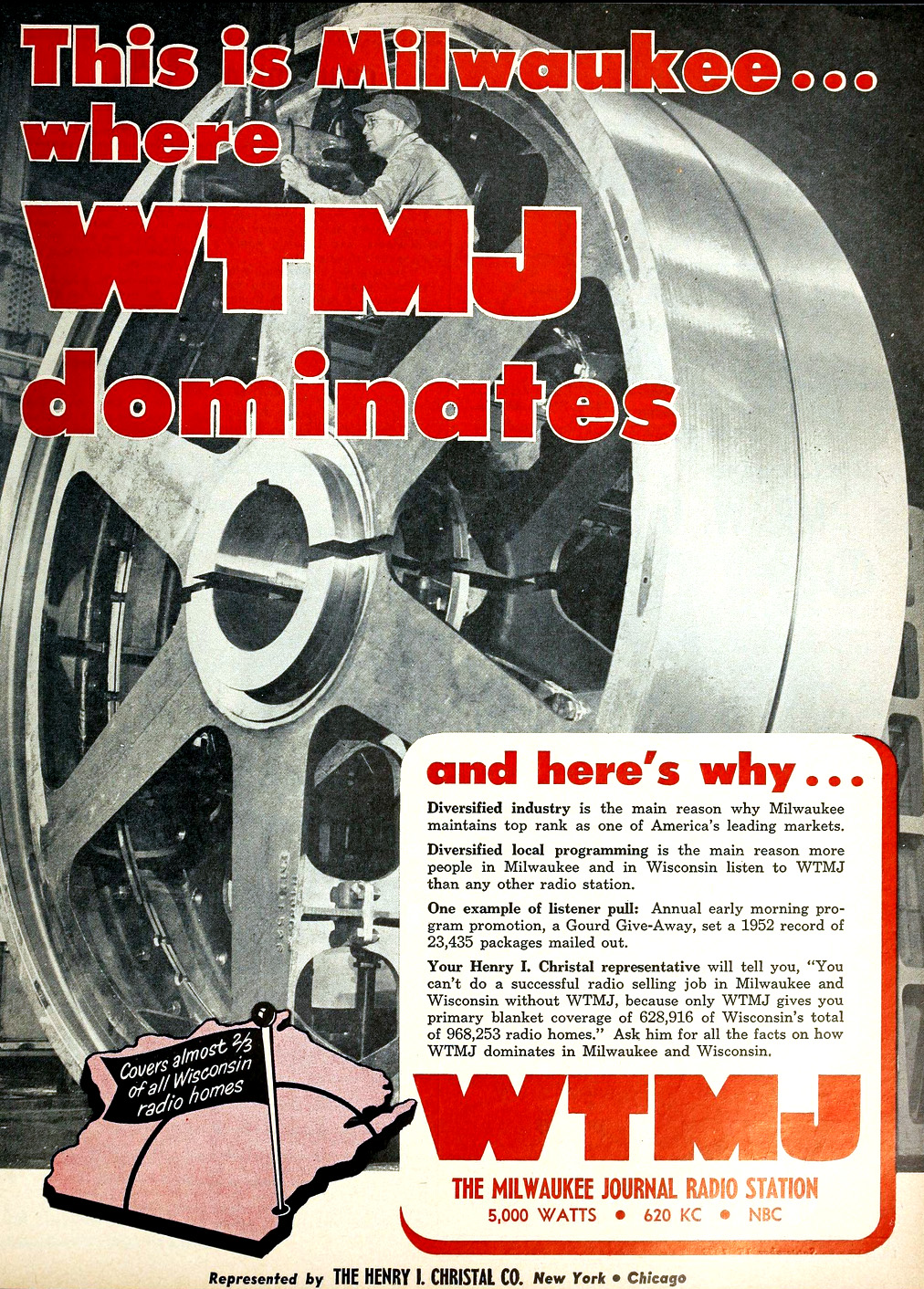
1952 advertisement for WTMJ

Beginning in 1961, WTMJ promoted Hinkley to host its morning drive program Top O' the Morning and call-in talk show Ask Your Neighbor. Top O' the Morning was the highest rated morning show in Milwaukee for five straight Arbitron surveys from summer 1977 to summer 1978. Hinkley hosted Top O' the Morning until 1984.

=== Sports ===
In 1968, WTMJ started broadcasting Milwaukee Bucks games. They have been the flagship of the Milwaukee Bucks Radio Network ever since the inception of the franchise.

In 1971, WTMJ began broadcasting Milwaukee Brewers games. WEMP broadcast the inaugural Brewers season the previous year. WTMJ temporarily lost the Brewers to rival WISN in 1981 and 1982.

Having been the most popular station in local Arbitron ratings, WTMJ tied Top 40 station WKTI in the top ratings spot in by spring 1990.

=== Switch to news/talk ===
By the summer of 1990, most of the music shows had been discontinued. WTMJ began to be listed as a news/talk station in the Arbitron ratings. In 1993, WTMJ hired two new talk show hosts, liberal Jay Marvin and conservative Charlie Sykes. Sykes joined WTMJ from rival WISN. Marvin left for WLS in Chicago after seven months.

Also in 1993, WTMJ lost the production rights to Wisconsin Badgers sports broadcasts because an employee submitted the bid for the rights minutes after the deadline had passed. Though the station no longer originated the network, it continued to be the network flagship under Learfield Communications, the new rightsholders.

=== Power increase ===
WTMJ was granted permission in 1995 to upgrade to 50,000 watts days and 10,000 watts nights from a new directional antenna. It uses a six-tower array, located in Union Grove, south of Milwaukee.

In November 1997, WTMJ switched its national news provider from CBS to ABC. WTMJ returned to CBS on October 1, 2001.

WTMJ logo from 2001 to 2013.

In 2002, Sykes and fellow WTMJ host Jeff Wagner led a campaign to recall Milwaukee County Executive Tom Ament, who was embroiled in scandal for abusing the county pension system; Ament controversially retired at the end of February 2002 to retain his own pension, rather than resign.

In 2013, WTMJ made changes to its programming and management. In March, Journal Communications fired program director Joe Scialfa, who had been with the station for 14 years beginning as producer for the Charlie Sykes show. That November, WTMJ elected not to renew its contract with the University of Wisconsin, thus ending over eight decades of broadcasting Wisconsin Badgers sports by 2014. WOKY and WRIT-FM became the new Milwaukee affiliates for the Wisconsin sports network effective in the 2014–15 season.

=== Changes in ownership ===
Journal Communications and the E. W. Scripps Company announced on July 30, 2014, that the two companies would merge to create a new broadcast company under the E.W. Scripps Company name that would own the two companies' broadcast properties, including WTMJ, WTMJ-TV, and WKTI-FM. The deal separated the WTMJ stations from the Journal Sentinel after nine decades, as the two companies' newspapers were spun off into a separate company under the Journal Media Group name (that company merged with Gannett itself in April 2016).

Both WTMJ radio and WTMJ-TV eventually partnered with the Milwaukee Business Journal after the sale for business coverage. The transaction was completed on April 1, 2015; E.W. Scripps would also continue to originate the Packers and Brewers radio networks.

Sykes hosted his final show on WTMJ on December 19, 2016, nearly a month after the election of Donald Trump as U.S. president, becoming through the election and to the present day, a leading voice of the Never Trump movement. In an essay for The New York Times, Sykes said: "The conservative media is broken and the conservative movement deeply compromised."

=== FM translator ===
On February 22, 2018, WTMJ began simulcasting on a monaural FM translator, W277CV at 103.3 MHz. It has its transmitter on the WTMJ-TV/WKTI tower.

The transmitter, formerly individually licensed to Frank Glass McCoy and leased to Scripps (who owns the physical tower and transmitter assets) and operated by Good Karma Sports, was formerly licensed to Waukegan, Illinois, and translated Kenosha public radio station WGTD before the move of the translator to Milwaukee. McCoy sold the translator license to Auslator, LLC in May 2019.

Call sign	Frequency	City of license	FID	ERP (W)	Class	Transmitter coordinates	FCC info
W277CV	103.3 FM	Milwaukee, Wisconsin	156555	250	D	43°5′29″N 87°54′7.3″W	LMS

Additionally, the station is simulcast at 88.5 FM within the campus of American Family Field, allowing fans attending Brewers games to listen to the radio play-by-play of the game without the broadcast delay presented both by the satellite delay to WTMJ's studios, and for regulatory reasons.

=== Good Karma Brands ===
On July 27, 2018, as part of its exit from radio, Scripps announced the sale of WTMJ and WKTI to Good Karma Brands. The stations became part of a cluster with ESPN Radio affiliate WAUK. Morgan Murphy Media and other local groups have made investments in Good Karma Brands to back the purchase. Good Karma took control of WTMJ and WKTI on November 1, 2018, thus separating the AM station from its TV cousin for the first time. Shortly after, WTMJ's HD Radio transmitter was taken out of service as the station had since established an FM translator.

After trailing other stations, including iHeartMedia news/talk station WISN, for the first three months of 2021, WTMJ returned to the top of Milwaukee radio ratings in April 2021. On October 27, 2021, the Green Bay Packers announced that it would end its longtime association with WTMJ at the end of the season, with WRNW taking over the rights in 2022; production of the broadcasts had been transferred from WTMJ to the team in 2018. WTMJ's final Packers broadcast was the NFC Divisional game, a 13–10 loss to the San Francisco 49ers on January 22, 2022.

On September 28, 2022, WTMJ, WKTI and WGKB departed Radio City for new showcase studios based in The Avenue MKE, within the Third Street Market Hall, two blocks from where it first broadcast as WCAY only a few months after the license's centennial.

== Programming ==
With hourly news updates from ABC News Radio, WTMJ airs news programming in morning and afternoon drive times. During the midday, the station airs live, local talk shows with Jeff Wagner and Steve Scaffidi. In the evenings, WTMJ has a three-hour sports talk show WTMJ Nights followed by nationally syndicated programs in late night hours including The Ramsey Show, Rich Valdés America at Night, Our American Stories with Lee Habeeb and This Morning, America's First News with Gordon Deal.

During weekends the station airs a mixture of local how-to programming, talk shows, local sports talk programs, sports play-by-play and national talk shows, for instance The Truth About Your Future with Ric Edelman and Compass Media Networks' This Weekend with Gordon Deal, in addition to ABC News' Perspective news magazine, the CBS News Weekend Roundup, and CBS's podcast The Takeout with Major Garrett.

WTMJ has broadcast the Milwaukee Bucks basketball team and Milwaukee Brewers baseball team for most of their histories. From 1929 to 2021, WTMJ served as the flagship radio station for the Green Bay Packers football team.

== Studios and transmitter ==
For 80 years, WTMJ was based at 720 East Capitol Drive in Milwaukee, in an Art Deco facility known as "Radio City" in tribute to the New York complex of the same name.

WTMJ and WKTI are the two primary entry points in southeastern Wisconsin for the state's Emergency Alert System (EAS) alerts. WTMJ's transmitter site is in Union Grove.

As of February 22, 2018, WTMJ's HD Radio simulcast on WKTI-HD2 (launched after Scripps' assumption of ownership) is broadcast within the core Milwaukee metro region by translator W277CV (103.3 FM), which is licensed to Milwaukee and transmits from the WTMJ-TV/WKTI tower just north of Radio City.

WTMJ broadcasts with 50,000 watts during daytime hours, and 10,000 watts during nighttime from a six-tower site in Union Grove, south of Milwaukee. Its daytime signal can be heard in much of eastern Wisconsin and as far away as Chicago. Four towers are used during the day, providing city-grade coverage to most of eastern Wisconsin (including Madison and Green Bay) and northern Illinois, with most of the Chicago area getting at least a grade B signal. At night, power is fed to all six towers in a directional pattern, concentrating the signal in Milwaukee, Green Bay, and Chicago.

The station also regularly rates outside the Milwaukee market; it rates in Sheboygan, despite that city being within its own radio market.

== See also ==
- List of initial AM-band station grants in the United States
