= WMBZ (FM) =

- West Bend, Wisconsin; United States
- Broadcast area: Northern Milwaukee suburbs
- Frequency: 92.5 MHz
- RDS: PI: 748B; PTY: Country; RT: Title - Artist
- Branding: 92.5 Buzz Country

Programming
- Format: Country
- Affiliations: Westwood One

Ownership
- Owner: David Magnum; (Magnum Communications, Inc.)
- Sister stations: WRYU, WVTY

History
- First air date: September 1958; 67 years ago (as WBKV-FM)
- Former call signs: WBKV-FM (1958–1988); WBWI-FM (1988–2015); WZRK (2015); WBWI-FM (2015)
- Call sign meaning: "Buzz"

Technical information
- Licensing authority: FCC
- Facility ID: 71542
- Class: B
- ERP: 17,500 watts
- HAAT: 164 meters (538 ft)
- Transmitter coordinates: 43.429°N 88.301°W

Links
- Public license information: Public file; LMS
- Webcast: Listen live
- Website: buzzcountry.com

WMBZ (92.5 MHz "Buzz Country 92.5") is a commercial FM radio station in West Bend, Wisconsin, serving Milwaukee's northern suburbs. WMBZ and sister station WVTY, which serves Milwaukee's southern suburbs, are co-programmed and air a country music radio format. They are owned by David Magnum, through licensee Magnum Communications, Inc., along with sister WRYU in West Bend.

WMBZ is a Class B FM station, with an effective radiated power (ERP) of 18,000 watts. The transmitter tower is on Wisconsin Highway 33 at Aurora Road in Addison.

== History ==
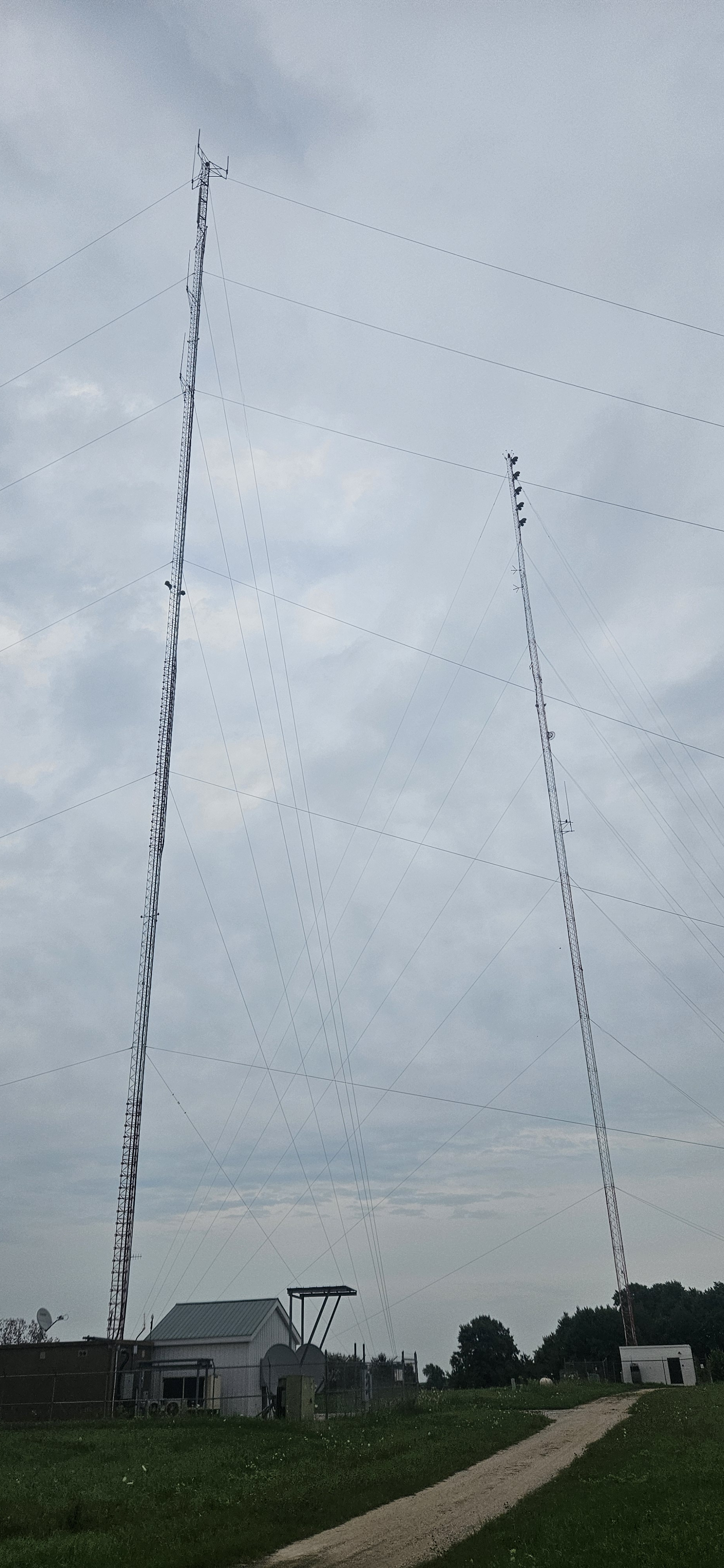
WMBZ 92.5 FM and W267CL 101.3 FM near Addison (right tower).

The station signed on the air in September 1958 as WBKV-FM, co-owned with WBKV (1470 AM). WBKV-FM was an easy listening station, playing quarter-hour sweeps of soft instrumentals and mellow vocals. WBKV-FM was later known as "V92" and featured an automated mix of adult contemporary and country music.

Logo as WBWI-FM

On September 16, 1988, the station picked up the WBWI-FM call sign. WBWI-FM flipped to its current country format in late 1989/early 1990. For a few years it was known as "92 Country Rock" then "92 Country" before it was renamed to "Pure Country". In 2004, the station rebranded to simply "92.5 WBWI".

On June 25, 2014, Bliss Communications announced that it would sell WBWI-FM and WBKV, along with WRJN and WVTY (then WEZY) in Racine. The buyer was David Magnum's Magnum Communications, Inc. Bliss had owned WBWI and WBKV since 1970 (when WBWI was still WBKV-FM). The sale, at a price of $2.25 million, was consummated on October 31, 2014.

On February 9, 2015, WBWI-FM rebranded as "Buzz Country". On February 18, 2015, WBWI-FM’s callsign was changed to WMBZ. WMBZ and co-owned 92.1 WVTY air separate commercials and on-air playlists, share staff and DJs and have a common playlist. In the past as its own operation, station has not served as a direct competitor of Milwaukee's main country station, WMIL-FM (106.1), but with the early 21st century growth of Washington County and WMIL now carrying out-of-market voicetracked hosts outside mornings, WMBZ and WVTY have seen listener growth as an alternative in the Milwaukee market.
