= WVTY =

Racine, Wisconsin; United States
- Broadcast area: Racine–Kenosha; Southern Milwaukee suburbs
- Frequency: 92.1 MHz
- Branding: 92.1 VTY Country

Programming
- Format: Country

Ownership
- Owner: Magnum Communications, Inc.
- Sister stations: WMBZ, WRYU

History
- First air date: 1961; 64 years ago (as WFNY)
- Former call signs: WFNY (1961–1986); WHKQ (1986–1995); WEZY (1995–2014); WMKQ (2014–2015)
- Call sign meaning: "Variety" (previous format)

Technical information
- Licensing authority: FCC
- Facility ID: 41438
- Class: A
- ERP: 2,700 watts
- HAAT: 150 meters (490 ft)
- Transmitter coordinates: 42.760°N 87.965°W

Links
- Public license information: Public file; LMS
- Webcast: Listen live
- Website: www.vtycountry.com

WVTY (92.1 MHz "92.1 VTY Country") is a commercial FM radio station in Racine, Wisconsin. It serves Racine, Kenosha and Milwaukee's southern suburbs. WVTY airs a country music radio format and is co-programmed with sister station 92.5 WMBZ in West Bend. They are owned by David Magnum, through licensee Magnum Communications, Inc., along with WRYU in West Bend.

WVTY is a Class A FM station with an effective radiated power (ERP) of 2,700 watts. The transmitter is off 2 Mile Road in Raymond (atop a tower previously used by WPXE-TV).

== History ==
The station signed on the air in 1961 as WFNY, a call sign derived from the name of owner Jerome Feeny. It was only powered at 1,000 watts and was a rare stand-alone FM station, with no co-owned AM outlet. WFNY aired a beautiful music format. It played quarter-hour sweeps of mostly soft instrumental cover versions of popular hits, with some Broadway and Hollywood show tunes.

Eventually an automated music playback system was installed, but live announcers remained on staff. Some of the air personalities over the years have included Paul Weyrich, Lou Rugani, Dave Garland, Don Jensen, Jerry Grimmer, Kevin Kellogg, Mike Kristof, Tim Yorgan, Chris Morreau, Gene Miller, Mike Petersen, and Frank Ricchio. In the 1980s, to make the sound a bit younger, more soft vocals were added to the playlist and the instrumentals were scaled back.

WFNY was sold in 1986 and the format was flipped to adult contemporary as WHKQ. Two years later, WHKQ became "Country 92". The station was sold once again in 1991, with the format returning to its easy listening origins. In 1995, the station adopted the WEZY call sign, using the branding "EZ92 WEZY". The easy listening format was simulcast on then-sister station WRJN overnights.

In 1997, Bliss Communications purchased WEZY and WRJN. Bliss owned eight other radio stations in Wisconsin and numerous newspapers in Wisconsin, Illinois and Michigan. On December 26, 1997, the station returned to a soft adult contemporary format. On January 2, 2007, WEZY changed its moniker to "Lite Rock 92.1".

On June 25, 2014, Bliss Communications announced that it would sell WEZY and WRJN, along with WBKV and WBWI-FM in West Bend, to David Magnum's Magnum Communications, Inc. The sale, at a price of $2.25 million, was consummated on October 31, 2014. On December 2, 2014, at 12:55 a.m., the station flipped to country music as Q92. Afterward, the station changed its call letters to WMKQ.

On May 29, 2015, WMKQ flipped to adult hits as 92.1 The Lake. This move came the same day that Milwaukee station 94.5 WLWK, which also branded as The Lake with an identical logo, flipped to country music as WKTI-FM. The de facto "swap" was intentional, with Magnum citing the "heritage" of the format in Milwaukee, and the decision by the station's new owner, The E.W. Scripps Company, to drop it.

The change in branding and Magnum's appropriation of WKTI's former branding caught Scripps off-guard. Representatives of both companies indicated that they were in discussions over the matter. On June 7, 2015, WMKQ changed its call letters to WVTY. Radio Insight also reported that Magnum had registered new domain names and social media accounts with different possible brands, 92.1 The Shore and Variety 92.1. On June 29, 2015, WVTY dropped its "Lake" moniker and rebranded as 92.1 The Shore.

On October 30, 2018, WVTY's management learned of WKTI's pending November 1 flip from country to ESPN Radio as part of its sale by Scripps to Good Karma Brands. That prompted WVTY to return to country music as 92.1 VTY Country. As with its use of the former Lake branding earlier, the station's new branding and logo is based heavily on the branding previously used by WKTI. Magnum Communications also purchased advertising time on WKTI to promote WVTY and West Bend sister station 92.5 WMBZ to its former listeners. While WVTY and WMBZ air separate commercials, they have the same DJs and play the same music.
