= WRIT-FM =

Radio station in Milwaukee, Wisconsin, US

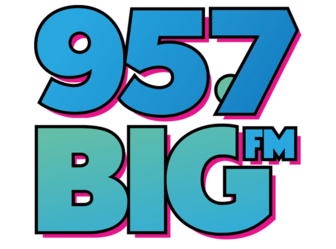
- Milwaukee, Wisconsin; United States
- Broadcast area: Greater Milwaukee
- Frequency: 95.7 MHz (HD Radio)
- Branding: 95.7 BIG FM

Programming
- Format: Classic hits
- Affiliations: Packers Radio Network; Premiere Networks; Wisconsin Badgers

Ownership
- Owner: iHeartMedia, Inc.; (iHM Licenses, LLC)
- Sister stations: WISN, WKKV-FM, WMIL-FM, WOKY, WRNW

History
- First air date: May 10, 1961
- Former call signs: WMIL-FM (1961–1971); WMVM (1971–1972); WZUU-FM (1972–1986); WBGK (1986–1987); WZTR (1987–2000)
- Call sign meaning: Heritage calls of what is now separately-owned WJOI, which stand for the phrase "We're it!"

Technical information
- Licensing authority: FCC
- Facility ID: 60233
- Class: B
- ERP: 34,000 watts
- HAAT: 186 meters (610 ft)
- Transmitter coordinates: 43.090°N 87.915°W

Links
- Public license information: Public file; LMS
- Webcast: Listen live (via iHeartRadio)
- Website: 957bigfm.iheart.com

WRIT-FM (95.7 FM, "BIG FM") is a commercial radio station licensed to Milwaukee, Wisconsin, United States, owned by iHeartMedia, Inc. It carries a classic hits format along with play-by-play of Green Bay Packers football and Wisconsin Badgers sports. The studios are on Howard Avenue in the Milwaukee suburb of Greenfield.

WRIT-FM's transmitter is sited on West Capitol Drive near North Port Washington Avenue in Glendale.

== History ==
=== Beautiful music, Top 40, Adult Alternative ===
The station signed on the air on May 10, 1961, as WMIL-FM. It initially aired a country and polka music format, simulcasting full-time with sister station WMIL (1290 AM). Following the purchase of both stations by Malrite Broadcasting, on May 12, 1968, the ethnic and polka music programming aired on the AM station shifted to WMIL-FM, allowing the AM station to continue with the country format full-time.

The FM station became WMVM in 1971, airing a beautiful music format. On June 1, 1972, consultant Mike Joseph switched WMVM and its AM sister station WMIL to a mainstream Top 40 format, under the new call letters WZUU and WZUU-FM. One of its chief rivals at the time was the original WRIT, as well as WOKY. WZUU's all-currents, no-oldies "Super Hits" format, which featured a tight playlist of 30 current songs, was a forerunner of Joseph's later Hot Hits stations of the late 1970s and early 1980s. After switching to an adult contemporary format in 1979, WZUU-FM returned to Top 40 as Z95 in late 1983, largely imitating sister station Z100 in New York City. At the same time as the FM switch, 1290 AM, which had changed call letters to WLZZ in 1982, began airing a country format, with "Larry The Legend" Johnson moving his morning show to WLZZ only.

In mid-1985, Malrite sold the stations to Amos Broadcasting. On March 31, 1986, WZUU switched to adult album alternative-format with the new call letters of WBGK. In 1987, the station flipped again, this time to adult contemporary-formatted Star 95.7 and the WZTR call sign.

=== Switch to Oldies ===
In the late 1980s, Milwaukee saw several of its FM stations playing a form of adult contemporary music, including WZTR. With all that competition, in 1988, WZTR switched to oldies, playing hits from the 1950s, 1960s and 1970s.

The station was known for a long time as "Oldies 95.7", even after it tweaked its format slightly and resurrected the memorable WRIT call sign on New Year's Day, 2000. In 2003, WRIT dropped the "oldies" designation from its name in favor of "95.7 WRIT". (Some Milwaukee area billboards displayed only "95.7" without the WRIT call letters.)

=== Transition to "My 95.7" ===
On September 1, 2006, at 5 p.m., after playing "American Pie" by Don McLean, WRIT began stunting by playing a wide assortment of songs and directing listeners to 957needshelp.com to request and vote for songs online, in a similar manner previously done on sister station WDTW-FM in Detroit.

The station unveiled its tweaked format on September 5 at 6 am, after playing an hour of songs containing the word "Magic". The station rebranded as "Milwaukee's 95.7", with a gold adult contemporary format. The first song under the new format was "Manic Monday" by The Bangles. In addition to the 1960s and 1970s oldies already being played, the station mixed in a few pop music selections from the 1980s. In 2007, the station began using the moniker "My 95.7."

=== Return to "Oldies 95.7" ===
At midnight on December 26, 2009, the station changed its name back to "Oldies 95.7". It aired an oldies format based on music from the 1960s, 1970s, and early 1980s. The station has since enjoyed consistent top 5 ratings finishes (12+) in the market.

On December 2, 2013, Learfield Sports and the University of Wisconsin–Madison announced that WRIT-FM would begin to carry Wisconsin Badgers football and men's basketball broadcasts in 2014. Sister station WOKY serves as the Badgers' primary Milwaukee outlet, though WRIT was brought in both due to WOKY's weak nighttime signal and the growing movement of sports rights to FM (sister stations WIBA and WIBA-FM have the same arrangement in Madison). The two stations collectively replaced longtime Badgers affiliate WTMJ. The FM Badgers broadcasts moved from WRIT to sister station WRNW in late November 2018 as part of that station's conversion to a sports talk format, though WRIT remained an overflow option if other Badger sports or Packers Radio Network coverage airs at the same time on WRNW.

=== 95.7 BIG FM ===
The station rebranded as "95.7 BIG FM, Milwaukee's Greatest Hits" at midnight on September 10, 2015. No changes in WRIT's existing format, playlist or call letters were made. "Cool Change" by Little River Band was the final song under the old branding, leading into "Big Time" by Peter Gabriel to inaugurate "BIG FM".

After the Christmas season in 2018, WRIT shifted its playlist in a heavily 1980s direction with the new slogan "80s and More", and including the addition of 1990s tracks, though 1970s (and a reduced 1960s selection, along with a very small number of 2000s tracks) remained a part of the playlist. The move was made to retain listeners of sister station WRNW after that station's aforementioned flip, along with some WRNW personalities moving to various WRIT shifts.

=== Packers and Badgers ===
WRIT-FM became the Milwaukee FM flagship for the Green Bay Packers Radio Network, along with the Badgers for a second time, in the middle of the 2025 season. WRNW, the Milwaukee home for both teams, ended its sports format on October 13, as it took on the former adult contemporary format and intellectual property of WLDB, which was being sold to the Educational Media Foundation. (Concurrent with the flip, WRNW's former sports format moved to an online-exclusive stream.)

Because iHeartMedia continues to hold the rights to Packers and Badgers games, WRIT-FM became the home of both teams in Milwaukee.

=== Christmas music ===
On November 17, 2005, WRIT began airing all-Christmas music programming, which lasted until after the holiday. This put WRIT in competition with Milwaukee's other seasonal Christmas music station, WMYX-FM, a station that had aired the format annually since 2003. For all subsequent holiday seasons, WRIT has played Christmas music, with the date of the launch each year varying between Halloween and Thanksgiving. In 2008, the station began airing Christmas music at 3:00 p.m. on Halloween, which remains the earliest date it has launched the format. WMYX went all-Christmas several minutes later.

Over the next several years, WRIT and WMYX engaged in a battle for Christmas music supremacy in Milwaukee. In 2009, WMYX won the Christmas music race by switching to the format at 7:00 p.m. on November 13. WRIT started playing Christmas music about 20 minutes later. In 2010, both stations waited until later in the year to flip formats. WRIT switched first, airing all-Christmas music on November 18 at 5:15 pm. WMYX waited to air the all-Christmas format until November 22 at 12:00 am. In 2011, the race started earlier. WMYX began playing Christmas music at 5:00 p.m. on November 10, followed by WRIT at 5:55 pm. WRIT became the first Milwaukee station to play Christmas music in 2012, launching into the format at 7:00 a.m. on November 21, the day before Thanksgiving. The same year, WMYX declined to air the Christmas music format for the first time since 2002, making WRIT Milwaukee's only FM radio station to play exclusively Christmas music during the holiday season. In 2016, WLDB (which traditionally begins their Christmas format post-Thanksgiving) began playing Christmas music on November 17; WRIT followed shortly thereafter. Since that point, WLDB has maintained its yearly position to be the first to switch, doing so on November 8, 2017, with WRIT waiting until hours before the Milwaukee civic Christmas tree lighting on November 17. 2018 saw WLDB convert on November 13, with WRIT again following on the 15th, hours before the lighting ceremony.

In 2025, WRIT ended its annual switch to Christmas music for much of November and December. Christmas music programming was shifted to sister station 97.3 WRNW after it flipped to adult contemporary music, ending its previous sports format.

== WRIT-FM HD2 ==
On April 25, 2006, Clear Channel announced that WRIT-FM's HD2 subchannel would carry the Classic Dance channel from their Format Lab, focusing on classic dance and disco hits from the 1970s and 1980s.

The format was switched to 1950s and 1960s oldies in May 2009, branded as The Mighty 92 and featuring heritage jingles from WOKY in the 1960s and 1970s, along with imaging from WOKY's oldies format, which ran from January 2007 to September 2008. WRIT-FM HD2 most recently aired iHeartMedia's "Real Oldies" format. The HD2 subchannel has since been turned off.
