= WITI (TV) =

Television station in Milwaukee

- Milwaukee, Wisconsin; United States
- Channels: Digital: 31 (UHF), shared with WVCY-TV; Virtual: 6
- Branding: Fox 6; TV 6.2

Programming
- Affiliations: 6.1: Fox; for others, see § Subchannels

Ownership
- Owner: Fox Television Stations, LLC

History
- First air date: May 21, 1956
- Former channel numbers: Analog: 6 (VHF, 1956–2009); Digital: 33 (UHF, 2002–2019)
- Former affiliations: Independent (1956–1959); CBS (1959–1961, 1977–1994); ABC (1961–1977)
- Call sign meaning: Independent Television, Incorporated (original licensee)

Technical information
- Licensing authority: FCC
- Facility ID: 73107
- ERP: 1,000 kW
- HAAT: 316 m (1,037 ft)
- Transmitter coordinates: 43°5′26″N 87°53′50″W

Links
- Public license information: Public file; LMS
- Website: fox6now.com

WITI (channel 6) is a television station in Milwaukee, Wisconsin, United States. Owned and operated by the Fox network through its Fox Television Stations division, WITI maintains studios on North Green Bay Road (WIS 57) in Brown Deer (though with a Milwaukee postal address), and its transmitter is located on East Capitol Drive (just north of WIS 190) in Shorewood.

== History ==
=== Early history ===
The station first signed on the air on May 21, 1956, operating as an independent station; it was originally owned by Independent Television, Inc., to whom the channel 6 construction permit was granted by the Federal Communications Commission (FCC) on June 29, 1955. The station was originally licensed to the North Shore village of Whitefish Bay on a technicality in order to address short-spacing concerns with WOC-TV in Davenport, Iowa (which also broadcast on channel 6), before the FCC fully finessed spacing among television station signals in different markets. In October 1956, the station affiliated with the NTA Film Network, which provided the station with 52 films from the 20th Century Fox library and syndicated programs. Among the NTA programs aired by WITI were The Passerby, Man Without a Gun and This is Alice.

Upon moving to their 27th Street studios, WITI began using RCA TK-11 monochrome cameras.

From 1956 to 1959, WITI used the DuMont Vitascan color system—which required a completely darkened set with a single strobe light, causing eye strain—for its locally produced programs. The situation was difficult for the on-air talent, according to Sid Armstrong, who worked at WITI as a news reporter during the station's early years. The station switched to monochrome cameras when it moved to the North 27th Street facility.

=== First tenure with CBS, and switch to ABC ===
On August 8, 1958, Storer Broadcasting purchased WITI in hopes of affiliating the station with CBS. Storer had very good relations with CBS; company founder George Storer was a member of the CBS board, and most of its stations were CBS affiliates. At the time, CBS owned a local UHF station, WXIX (originally channel 19, reassigned to channel 18, now WVTV) as part of a corporate effort to determine if UHF station operation and ownership would be successful. Once the disadvantages of being on a UHF frequency became clear in the days before all-channel tuning, CBS wrote off the experiment as a failure. The network concluded it was better to have its programming on a VHF station, even if it was only an affiliate. CBS sold WXIX to Cream City Broadcasting president Gene Posner; WITI-TV then began its first stint as a CBS affiliate on April 1, 1959. At that time, WITI moved from its original studio facility in Mequon to WXIX's former studios on North 27th Street in Milwaukee (which were later used by WCGV-TV from 1980 to 1994). Storer also applied to move the channel 6 allocation from Whitefish Bay to Milwaukee; the request was granted on July 30, 1959.

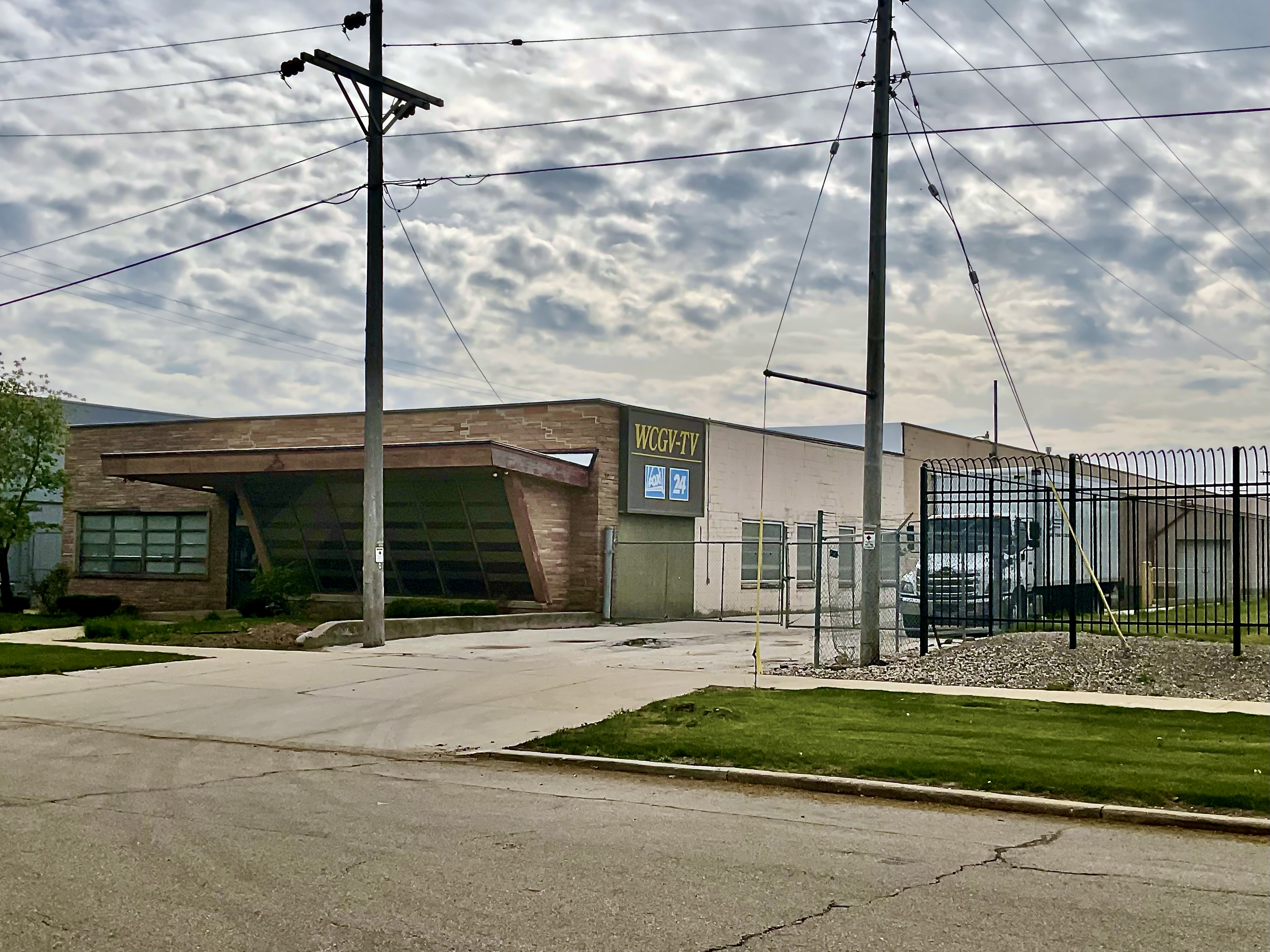
WITI's studio from 1959 until 1979, when it was purchased by WCGV-TV after WITI's move to Brown Deer. Even after WCGV's merger with WVTV in 1994, WITI's first studio continues to be an active production facility and its studios remain in use for commercial and video production.

In 1961, WITI lost the NTA network due to its closure, and CBS decided to affiliate with WISN-TV (channel 12), as its sister radio station had been a longtime affiliate of the CBS Radio Network. As a result, WITI-TV and WISN-TV swapped networks: channel 6 became an ABC affiliate on April 2, 1961. The final CBS program channel 6 aired before it switched to ABC was the original broadcast of the Gunsmoke episode "Little Girl", which ran the evening before the switch at 9 p.m. Central Time. In August 1962, the station moved to its current 1,078-foot (329 m) transmission tower located in Shorewood; for a short time, the transmitter had been the tallest free-standing tower in the world. The tower went into operation in 1963, finally putting WITI's signal on equal footing with Milwaukee's other television stations.

=== Second tenure with CBS ===
During the 1975–76 season, ABC emerged as the highest-rated broadcast network in the United States–thanks in part to the success of two Milwaukee-set sitcoms, Happy Days and its spin-off Laverne & Shirley. However, Storer Broadcasting had developed a bitter relationship with the network stemming from ABC's June 1976 decision to move its affiliation in the San Diego market from Storer-owned KCST-TV to former NBC outlet KGTV. Three years earlier KCST, a UHF independent station, won a long battle to strip the market's ABC affiliation from Tijuana, Mexico-based VHF outlet XETV. Storer purchased KCST the following year, but ABC was not happy with being forced to surrender an affiliation with a VHF station in favor of a UHF outlet. Perhaps in protest, Storer announced on September 26, 1976, that it would re-affiliate WITI with CBS. Without hesitation, WISN-TV aligned with ABC, officially reversing the earlier 1961 affiliation swap; the two stations switched networks once again on March 27, 1977; the final ABC program to air on channel 6 was a rerun of the two-part Starsky & Hutch episode "Murder at Sea", which aired at 8 p.m. Central Time on the night before the station rejoined CBS.

In 1978, WITI moved its operations to a new facility located on North Green Bay Road in Brown Deer, just outside Milwaukee; the upstart WCGV-TV (channel 24), which would eventually air programming from CBS that WITI refused, purchased WITI's former studios and used them from 1980 until 1994. It was one of the few Storer stations which used a more modern and open design for its studio building, compared to Storer's traditional use of Georgian and Colonial facades on its other studio facilities.

After Storer Broadcasting was bought out by Kohlberg Kravis Roberts (KKR) in 1985, the station underwent a series of ownership changes. KKR sold the stations to Racine native George N. Gillett Jr.'s Gillett Communications in 1987; shortly thereafter, SCI Television was spun off from Gillett to acquire the stations after the latter company filed for bankruptcy. After Gillett defaulted on some of its financing agreements in the early 1990s, its ownership was restructured and the company was renamed SCI Television.

Eventually, SCI ran into fiscal issues; on June 26, 1991, Gillett Holdings filed for Chapter 11 bankruptcy protection after it failed to reach an agreement with the company's creditors before a court-imposed June 25 deadline. SCI Television also missed repayment of $162 million in bank loans before a June 30 deadline; as a consequence of its financial difficulties, Gillett/SCI decided to sell its broadcast holdings. On February 17, 1993, one day after SCI purchased WTVT in Tampa from Gillett Holdings in a separate agreement for $163 million, New World Pictures purchased a 51% ownership stake in SCI Television from Gillett for $100 million and $63 million in newly issued debt. The purchase was finalized on May 25, at which point, the film and television production company folded WITI and its six sister stations—fellow CBS affiliates WTVT, WJW-TV in Cleveland, WJBK-TV in Detroit and WAGA-TV in Atlanta, NBC affiliate KNSD in San Diego and independent station WSBK-TV in Boston—into a new broadcasting subsidiary, New World Communications.

=== Switch to Fox station ===
==== New World Communications ownership ====
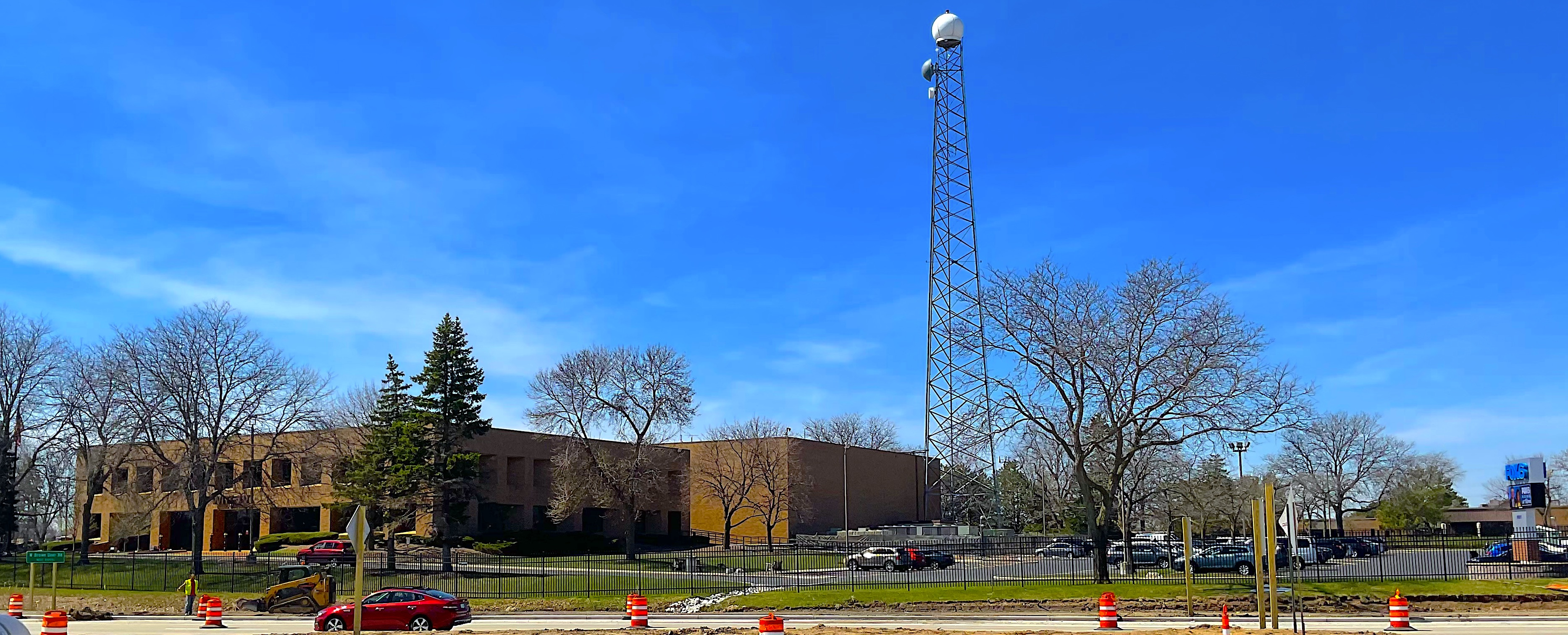
WITI's studios in Brown Deer, seen across North Green Bay Road (WI 57)

On May 23, 1994, as part of a broad deal that also saw News Corporation acquire a 20% equity interest in the company, New World Communications signed a long-term agreement to affiliate its nine CBS-, ABC- or NBC-affiliated television stations with Fox, which sought to strengthen its affiliate portfolio after the National Football League (NFL) accepted the network's $1.58 billion bid for the television rights to the National Football Conference (NFC)—a four-year contract that began with the 1994 NFL season—on December 18, 1993. WITI-TV was among the stations involved in the Fox agreement, which also initially included four of New World's other existing CBS-affiliated stations—WJBK-TV, WJW-TV, WTVT and WAGA-TV—and four additional stations—CBS affiliate KSAZ-TV in Phoenix, ABC affiliates WBRC-TV in Birmingham and WGHP in Greensboro–Winston-Salem–High Point, North Carolina, and NBC affiliate WDAF-TV in Kansas City—that were part of New World's concurrent $360-million acquisition of Great American Communications's television properties. (The agreement would subsequently be amended to include four additional stations that New World acquired later that month from Argyle Television Holdings.) At the time, Fox's owned-and-operated and affiliate stations were mostly UHF outlets that had limited to no prior history as major network affiliates, among them its existing Milwaukee outlet, WCGV-TV, which had been affiliated with Fox since the network inaugurated prime time programming in April 1987. Although WCGV had become a formidable competitor to rival independent WVTV, Fox found the prospect to having its programming carried on a VHF station too much to resist. Its news department had been long-respected and well-awarded, and had spent most of the last two decades in a spirited battle with WISN-TV for second place in total day and news viewership behind WTMJ-TV (channel 4). While channel 6 was in third place by the time the switch was announced, it was in a far stronger market position than its ratings indicated.

With only a few months before WITI was set to switch to Fox, CBS began making plans to find a new Milwaukee affiliate and approached all of the market's major television stations to potentially reach an agreement, which was hampered partly because of the network's then-faltering ratings and an older-skewing programming slate. CBS first entered into discussions with WTMJ-TV for a contract; that station was subsequently eliminated as an option as NBC decided to approach Journal Communications to renew its contract with WTMJ-TV. WISN-TV was automatically eliminated as an option for CBS as it was in the middle of a long-term affiliation agreement between ABC and that station's owner, Hearst Broadcasting. The respective owners of WCGV and WVTV at the time—ABRY Communications and Gaylord Broadcasting (the latter of which had already reached deals to switch two fellow independents, KTVT in Fort Worth and KSTW in Tacoma, to CBS)—also turned the network's offers down. This left the market's lower-rated independents—commercial outlets WJJA (channel 49, now independent station WMLW-TV) and WDJT-TV (channel 58) or religious outlet WVCY-TV (channel 30)—as the only viable options with which CBS could reach an affiliation agreement; WVCY owner VCY America would eliminate itself from the running after the owner of its parent licensee, Vic Eliason (in consultation with the VCY America board), declined a $10 million offer by CBS Inc. to acquire that station directly on grounds that the bid was "unreasonably" below market value in a letter that also objected to racy programming content carried by the major U.S. broadcast networks. WJJA's owner, minister Joel Kinlow, wanted to maintain his station as a training venue for those wanting to know about the broadcasting business, but also did not want the stress of running a network affiliate, and thus also declined an affiliation offer.

With a month to go before WITI was to join Fox, CBS had still not found a replacement affiliate. It was faced with the prospect of arranging to have out-of-market affiliates in nearby areas (either WISC-TV in Madison, or its two owned-and-operated stations in the region, WFRV-TV in Green Bay or WBBM-TV in Chicago) imported to cable systems throughout Southeastern Wisconsin until it could or in case it did not secure a new affiliate in Milwaukee. Virtually out of desperation, on December 6, CBS reached a ten-year agreement with Weigel Broadcasting to affiliate with WDJT, despite the mediocre quality of its broadcast signal and the absence of a news department. The announcement came as a relief to WITI, which had prepared to help viewers find relocated programs via a telephone helpline and print advertising. However, it had been unable to launch the campaign without a replacement affiliate. The last CBS network program to air on WITI was a first-run episode of Walker, Texas Ranger at 9 p.m. Central Time on December 10; this led into a message by then-station president and general manager Andrew Potos shortly before the start of that evening's edition of TV-6 News at 10:00, informing viewers about the pending network changes.

WITI-TV officially became a Fox affiliate on December 11, 1994, when the network's programming lineup moved to the station from WCGV; the first Fox network program to air on the station as a full-time affiliate was Fox NFL Sunday at 11 a.m. Central Time that day, leading into that afternoon's NFL doubleheader: the 1994 Chicago Bears–Green Bay Packers game at Lambeau Field (which served as one of Fox's early regional games that day and saw the Packers win in a 40–3 blowout victory) and a mid-afternoon national game between the San Francisco 49ers and the San Diego Chargers. WCGV temporarily converted into an independent station in the run-up to affiliating with the upstart United Paramount Network (UPN) the following month (on January 16, 1995), though retaining Fox Kids, as WITI held no interest in carrying the network's children's lineup due to a successful weekday afternoon and Saturday morning lineup, as most New World stations did. As a result of CBS affiliating with WDJT, Milwaukee became one of only two television markets affected by the New World deal (along with Detroit) where the replacement Big Three affiliate did not displace some of its existing syndicated programming following the local affiliation switch.

In keeping with the branding conventions of most of the other New World-owned stations affected by the affiliation agreement with Fox, WITI-TV retained its longtime "TV-6" branding (which it adopted in 1973 as an ABC affiliate) upon the affiliation switch, with references to the Fox logo and name limited in most on-air imaging as well as the news branding it had been using before it joined Fox – in its case, TV-6 News, the base moniker of which the station adopted in November 1984 as a CBS affiliate. In addition to expanding its local news programming at the time it joined Fox, the station replaced CBS daytime and late night programs that migrated to WDJT with an expanded slate of syndicated talk shows as well as some off-network sitcoms, game shows and documentary-based reality series, and also acquired some syndicated film packages and first-run and off-network syndicated drama series for broadcast in weekend afternoon timeslots on weeks when Fox did not provide sports programming; most notably it still holds the rights to a package of colorized RKO Pictures films (now a part of the Warner Bros. Discovery library after being colorized by then-rights holder Turner Entertainment in the late 1980s) as of 2023. Unburdened by having to carry Fox Kids, WITI's revamped programming schedule—as was the case with most of New World's other Fox stations—relegated children's programs to the regulatory minimum on weekends, with the station instead choosing to continue producing their popular local homebuilding and home maintenance programming (and in the case of Ask Gus, a do-it-yourself instructional program hosted by station announcer and Wake Up News contributor Gus Gnorski, expanding it to a full weekly program).

In the fall of 1995, WITI dropped its longtime branding as "TV-6" and began branding itself as "Six is News", in order to emphasize the station's newly expanded news schedule. Conversely, in a move to comply with the network's branding conventions, Fox and other entertainment programming on the station was promoted as "Fox is Six" to try to build an audience for the growing network on the stronger Milwaukee station. (Cleveland sister station WJW used a very similar branding technique at that same period, branding itself as "ei_{8}ht is News" and "Fox is ei_{8}ht", playing off the on-air branding that the station used as a CBS affiliate during the 1960s and 1970s.)

==== First Fox Television Stations ownership period ====
On July 17, 1996, News Corporation announced that it would acquire New World in an all-stock transaction worth $2.48 billion. The purchase by News Corporation was finalized on January 22, 1997, folding New World's ten Fox affiliates into the former's Fox Television Stations subsidiary and making all twelve stations affected by the 1994 agreement owned-and-operated stations of the network. The transaction also made WITI the first Milwaukee television station to serve as an owned-and-operated station of a major network since CBS owned WOKY-TV/WXIX (now WVTV) from 1954 to 1959.

On January 26, coinciding with Fox's telecast of Super Bowl XXXI (Fox's first Super Bowl telecast, in which the Packers defeated the New England Patriots), WITI-TV changed its branding from "Fox is Six" and "Six is News" to simply "Fox Six" (with its newscasts concurrently rebranding as Fox Six News), using a logo that matched the design language of the logo for the NFL on Fox, with "SIX" in place of "NFL". Subsequently, in April 1998, WITI simplified its branding to "Fox 6". (Coinciding with this, the station introduced the "Milwaukee's Newscenter" set that would remain in use until 2011, along with a "Weather Deck" located outside of Brown Deer Road studio facility that was used as an outdoor setting for forecast segments.)

==== Local TV and Tribune ownership ====
WITI's station logo from 2007 until the fall of 2020.

On December 22, 2007, Fox sold WITI and seven other owned-and-operated stations – WJW, WBRC, WGHP, WDAF-TV, KTVI in St. Louis, KDVR in Denver and KSTU in Salt Lake City – to Local TV LLC (a broadcast holding company operated by private equity firm Oak Hill Capital Partners that was formed on May 7 of that year to assume ownership of the broadcasting division of The New York Times Company) for $1.1 billion; the sale was finalized on July 14, 2008. Through a management company formed between Local TV and the Chicago-based Tribune Company formed the day prior to the Fox station purchase (December 21) to handle the operation of its existing broadcast television properties and the Local TV stations as well as provide web hosting, technical and engineering services to stations run by the latter group, WITI began sharing newsgathering resources between WITI and Tribune's television flagship WGN-TV in the adjacent Chicago market. (In addition, channel 6 continues to share news footage and other resources with Fox's Chicago O&O WFLD through the Fox NewsEdge affiliate service.) Under this same agreement, WITI has also carried certain public interest programming carried by other Tribune/Local TV stations such as a May 6, 2011 telethon produced by Huntsville sister station WHNT-TV, which was carried by WITI over digital subchannel 6.2, to raise funds for organizations helping victims of the April 27 Super Outbreak that affected Alabama). On July 1, 2013, the Tribune Company announced it would acquire the assets of Local TV LLC for $2.75 billion; the sale was completed on December 27.

On August 28, 2014, WITI's affiliation with Fox officially became the longest network affiliation the station held, passing the station's 7,200 days (or near 19¾ years) over its two separate stints as a CBS affiliate.

==== Aborted sale to Sinclair ====
On May 8, 2017, Hunt Valley, Maryland-based Sinclair Broadcast Group—which owns CW affiliate WVTV (channel 18) and owned MyNetworkTV affiliate WCGV-TV at the time—entered into an agreement to acquire Tribune Media for $3.9 billion, plus the assumption of $2.7 billion in debt held by Tribune. Sinclair had already announced that it had sold WCGV's spectrum in April in the FCC's 2016 spectrum auction and it would cease operations in technicality, albeit with WCGV's main schedule and subchannel moving to WVTV's DT2 subchannel on January 8, 2018; that move effectively would have alleviated any regulatory complications involving the sale for the Milwaukee stations, outside any physical and employee assets that would have been sorted out prior to the deal's closure. The purchase of WITI would have given Sinclair control of the three Fox affiliates in Wisconsin's largest markets (Sinclair already owns WMSN-TV in Madison and WLUK-TV in Green Bay). On December 15, 2017, it was speculated that Sinclair would then re-sell WITI back to Fox Television Stations; however, on April 24, 2018, when Sinclair announced its list of the 23 stations that it would sell in order to alleviate conflicts with FCC ownership rules as well as those with Fox over the affiliate share it would have had if the purchase had not been modified, WITI was not included among them.

On July 18, 2018, the FCC voted to have the Sinclair–Tribune acquisition reviewed by an administrative law judge amid "serious concerns" about Sinclair's forthrightness in its applications to sell certain conflict properties; with the future of the deal still uncertain, 21st Century Fox reached a multi-year agreement with Tribune to renew the affiliations of WITI and five of the group's other Fox affiliates on August 6, 2018. Three days later on August 9, Tribune announced it would terminate the Sinclair deal, and concurrently filed a breach of contract lawsuit in the Delaware Chancery Court, alleging that Sinclair engaged in protracted negotiations with the FCC and the DOJ over regulatory issues, refused to sell stations in markets where it already had properties, and proposed divestitures to parties with ties to Sinclair executive chair David D. Smith that were rejected or highly subject to rejection to maintain control over stations it was required to sell.

==== Sale to Nexstar; resale to Fox ====
On December 3, 2018, Irving, Texas–based Nexstar Media Group announced it would acquire Tribune's assets for $6.4 billion in cash and debt. The deal—which would make Nexstar the largest television station operator by total number of stations upon its expected closure late in the third quarter of 2019—would give WITI temporary sister stations in nearby markets including Green Bay (CBS affiliate WFRV-TV), La Crosse–Eau Claire (Fox affiliate WLAX and satellite WEUX) and Rockford (Fox affiliate WQRF-TV and ABC-affiliated SSA partner WTVO). The sale was approved by the FCC on September 16 and was completed on September 19, 2019.

On November 5, 2019, Nexstar Media Group announced that WITI would be re-acquired by Fox Television Stations (which by then had become a subsidiary of Fox Corporation following the acquisition of 21st Century Fox by The Walt Disney Company) in a $350 million deal that also includes Seattle sister stations KCPQ and KZJO, and is concurrent with Nexstar's purchase of WJZY and WMYT-TV in Charlotte, North Carolina from Fox. Fox stated that Milwaukee and Seattle were "two key markets that align with the company's sports rights" (referencing their primary carriage of Seattle Seahawks and Green Bay Packers home games, respectively). The sale was completed on March 2, 2020.

== WITI-DT2 ==
On July 23, 2009, after a series of tests of a new digital subchannel, WITI began carrying programming from the Retro Television Network on digital channel 6.2, featuring a customized schedule heavy on public domain programs as much of RTV's program rights were held locally by Weigel Broadcasting-owned MeTV on WBME-TV (channel 49, now WMLW-TV) at the time, which was then independently programmed before Me-TV's December 2010 national launch. Charter Communications began carrying the 6.2 subchannel on channel 967 (now 189) on August 11, followed by its addition to Time Warner Cable on digital channel 991 on October 13, 2009.

On December 31, 2010, the subchannel became an affiliate of Antenna TV (as part of network owner Tribune Broadcasting's co-management agreement with Local TV's stations), and was rebranded as TV 6.2 (using a modified version of the "TV 6" logomark that WITI used from 1973 to 1995). Occasionally as time permits, TV-6.2 may air the station's 9 p.m. newscast whenever it is unable to run it on the station's main channel in the event of sports overruns or extended movie broadcasts aired by Fox as well as to simulcast the station's severe weather coverage, including closings and weather warning graphics. The subchannel also aired coverage of the December 2010 funeral of Chicago Cubs legend Ron Santo from WGN-TV; it previously aired a same-day encore of Real Milwaukee at 8 p.m. weeknights.

In the fall of 2015, TV-6.2's presentation was converted to 16:9 to allow local advertising and news promotions to be presented in their native format, along with carrying Fox NFL Kickoff on Sunday mornings as mentioned below. Programming and some local advertising, along with program promos are still in the 4:3 format. During the FIFA World Cup and golf's U.S. Open in mid-June and July 2018, WITI shifted daytime news programming and Real Milwaukee to WITI-DT2 to accommodate the World Cup's morning and early afternoon scheduling. It also occasionally carries the 9 p.m. newscast in rare cases where Fox requires national coverage of a breaking news story.

== Programming ==
WITI delays Fox's Saturday late night repeat block by a half-hour due to the station's 10 p.m. newscast. In its first period as a Fox-owned station, WITI's syndicated programming inventory largely came from 20th Television and it has served as a test station for many of the distribution unit's series, a role it has resumed with Fox First Run; 20th Television was absorbed into Disney-ABC Domestic Television in 2020. Since 2010, programs distributed by Fox have been reduced to only a small portion of channel 6's syndicated lineup (including various repeat packages of COPS until it was pulled in 2020), and shows produced by other distributors such as Sherri, a program which already has FTS as its major affiliate base. Some other syndicated programs seen on WITI include Judge Judy, TMZ on TV/TMZ Live and Extra among others, along with Access Hollywood, the latter three forming a late night entertainment news block. The station also carries Builder's Showcase on Saturday mornings, which is also carried on Madison Fox affiliate WMSN and Green Bay/Fox Cities NBC affiliate WGBA-TV, and a longtime fixture of the station produced since July 2000 by the station's advertising department where homebuilding services are offered (it and an additional half-hour of paid programming fill what would otherwise be the first hour of Big Noon Kickoff during the fall, which instead airs on WITI-DT2). Until 2019, Fox's NFL Kickoff, which precedes Fox NFL Sunday, was aired on WITI-DT2 on Sunday mornings instead due to E/I commitments and an existing syndication agreement to carry the tourism series Discover Wisconsin on Sunday mornings (in the 2019 season, the allowance by the FCC to air E/I programming in the 6 a.m. hour allowed the carriage of Kickoff on 6.1 for the first time). The station's E/I requirements are fulfilled by the Xploration Station block offered by Fox, often before the station's weekend morning newscasts.

As an ABC affiliate, WITI preempted The Dick Cavett Show in the early 1970s, in favor of classic movies, All My Children in favor of running a noon newscast, American Bandstand for movies or syndicated fare, One Life to Live and Dark Shadows in favor of an afternoon movie, and ABC News (when it was a 15-minute broadcast) due to local news or syndicated shows; in the case of these programs, they were picked up by WVTV until 1972 when the then-independent discontinued the secondary arrangement after 12 years. Eventually, OLTL, Bandstand, and ABC News were later cleared by WITI until the switch to CBS.

As a CBS affiliate, WITI aired M*A*S*H starting with the 1977 CBS/ABC affiliation switch, in both its original CBS run and in syndication. WITI obtained the local syndication rights to the show in 1992 after a long and successful run on WISN-TV, where it likewise ran first-run locally until the end of its fifth season. WITI also continued to follow WISN's preemption of Search For Tomorrow and by 1979 dropped Love of Life (before CBS canceled the serial in 1980) as well as repeats of CBS sitcoms and underperforming daytime game shows (the lone exception was the one-week, 9 a.m. delay of The Price Is Right from 1977 to 1980) due to the success it had with Phil Donahue in the 11 a.m. hour. In 1980, it aired The Young and the Restless on a one-day delay at 9 a.m. It was also among the handful of CBS affiliates that opted not carry Pryor's Place due to concerns that parents would protest a station airing a Saturday morning program starring a comedian known for using controversial and racially insensitive material. The station also preempted the Late Show with David Letterman in favor of airing M*A*S*H reruns from the former's August 1993 debut until the December 1994 switch to Fox, continuing a long-time practice of substituting local and syndicated programming for CBS's late night offerings, including the Late Movie and Crimetime After Primetime (though it did carry The Pat Sajak Show, albeit delayed); WCGV carried the Late Show instead, under arrangement by CBS, until it moved to WDJT upon the switch. It also was one of the first CBS affiliates to discontinue airing CBS This Morning during the 7 a.m. hour in 1993 in favor of airing the locally produced WakeUp News. Back then, the network offered the option for affiliates to carry only portions of This Morning or decline it entirely.

As with most of the former New World stations that switched to Fox, WITI never aired Fox's children's programming outside of required prime time preview shows and network promotions they were technically and contractually unable to opt out of. Fox Kids and its successors remained on WCGV from December 1994 to September 2004, when the block—by that time, known as 4Kids TV—moved to WMLW-CA (channel 41, now WBME-CD), where it remained until Fox discontinued the block in December 2008 due to a contractual dispute with 4Kids Entertainment. Subsequently, WITI refused to carry Fox's Saturday morning Weekend Marketplace infomercial block (as have WCGV and WMLW), in deference to the longtime local home contractor/subdivision programming that has aired on channel 6 in that time period since the late 1980s; the block was never aired at all in the Milwaukee market. WITI finally carried some form of Fox children's programming beginning in September 2014, when the two-hour E/I-contributing Xploration Station lineup (which is syndicated primarily to Fox affiliates on a right of first refusal basis) began to air on Saturday mornings after the brokered home programming.

On March 31, 2009, WITI had its first network preemption outside of children's programming since it joined Fox in 1994 when it opted to delay Osbournes: Reloaded to 1:05 a.m., due to its inappropriate content, in favor of airing the locally produced special Dealing with Drugs (a discussion about the effects of drug abuse on southeastern Wisconsin teens) in the former's evening slot.

WITI aired its first non-network program in HD with the November 21, 2009, broadcast of the Milwaukee Downtown Christmas Parade (with training and equipment assistance from Milwaukee Public Television). The station formerly served as Milwaukee's "Love Network" affiliate for the Jerry Lewis MDA Labor Day Telethon. WITI aired the program until 1996, when it moved to WDJT-TV; the telethon returned to WITI in 2011, although it lost the rights once again when the broadcast moved to ABC in 2013 (as a result, it was carried locally by WISN-TV until the telethon ended in 2014).

=== Local programming ===
On September 7, 2010, WITI debuted a local talk show, titled Real Milwaukee, which aired after the station's morning newscast at 9 a.m.; it was produced by WITI's news department, and focused on current events and community issues. The program differed from The Morning Blend on WTMJ-TV (channel 4) in that it did not feature paid demonstration segments by local businesses. The station does carry a paid advertorial segment called Fox Focus during its daytime programming, though only within the form of an extended traditional commercial break. Generally, Real Milwaukee led or placed a strong second in the ratings to all other programs in the 9 a.m. time period. In mid-March 2020, Real Milwaukee was placed on hiatus due to the COVID-19 pandemic making its traditional format and seating arrangement impossible to maintain through videotelephony, with a one-hour extension of WakeUp taking its place. The 9 a.m. WakeUp extension was eventually made permanent a few months later. Real Milwaukee returned again on September 27, 2021, this time airing at 10 a.m., with it now a part of 7½ consecutive hours of news and local programming in the morning.

From September 9, 2013, to July 11, 2016, WITI aired a weekday afternoon talk show, Studio A, which aired at 4 p.m. and was hosted by anchors Ted Perry and former news anchor Katrina Cravy, who left to launch a consulting firm, and former WLUM-FM (102.1) morning host Brian Kramp, the program focused mainly on community issues and events in Milwaukee, and provided breaking news coverage if needed. Upon its later cancellation, Kramp moved to features for Real Milwaukee.

On Saturday mornings, the first hour of Big Noon Kickoff is carried instead by WITI-DT2, as WITI has carried the real estate program Builder's Showcase Television at 9 a.m. Saturday mornings since 1993, followed by the tourism program Discover Wisconsin; BNK is also simulcast on sister cable channel FS1 in full.

=== Sports programming ===
WITI began serving as the primary television station for the Green Bay Packers as a CBS affiliate in 1959, when the network obtained the television rights to the pre-AFL merger National Football League; after the switch to ABC, no games aired until 1970 when Monday Night Football premiered on the network. WITI has aired most regional or national Packers game telecasts since returning to CBS in 1977, albeit with a three-month interruption due to CBS losing its contractual rights to the National Football Conference following the 1993 season (the games instead aired on WCGV for the first three months of Fox's NFC telecasts as a lame-duck affiliate, but without any pre-game programming). Through the transfer of the NFC television rights from CBS for the 1994 season, the station's December 1994 switch to Fox allowed WITI to retain its status as Milwaukee's "home" station for the Packers. It also carried the team's Thursday Night Football games involving the Packers from NFL Network locally early on in that package's life before it began simulcasts on CBS (2014 and 2015), along with NBC starting in 2016, before returning to Fox exclusively in the 2018 season until the end of the 2021 season. The station is the local rights holder (as a Fox owned-and-operated station) for the team's TNF games on Amazon Prime Video under the current NFL package, starting with the 2022 game versus the Tennessee Titans.

In 2025, WITI announced an agreement with the Milwaukee Brewers to simulcast 10 regular season and three spring training games with FanDuel Sports Network Wisconsin.

=== News operation ===
WITI logo used in 2020

As of April 2026 WITI currently broadcasts 66 1/2 hours of locally produced newscasts each week (with 11 1/2 hours each weekday, four hours on Saturdays and five hours on Sundays, and five hours of Real Milwaukee on each weekday; this does not count 90 minutes of news replays in overnights); in regards to the number of hours devoted to news programming, it is the highest newscast output among Milwaukee's broadcast television stations, and in the state of Wisconsin overall. In addition, the station produces the Fox 6 Blitz, a Green Bay Packers wrap-up program that airs Sundays during the NFL season at 10:35 p.m. and also serves as a post-game show following Milwaukee Brewers Fox broadcasts. During late-running coverage of Fox College Football (when the network carries West Coast games) and other late sporting events, the 10 p.m. newscast runs first through Fox 6's local presence on Fox Television Stations's FoxLocal app, then airs on WITI after game completion.

The station has also experimented over the years with extended news coverage outside its scheduled hours through their website and WITI-DT2 when available, and with the transition of its mobile and digital media player apps from an individual station app to Fox Television Station's FoxLocal platform in 2024, now also produces additional live news content daily on FoxLocal, which also allows newscasts to air even if the over-the-air signal is carrying network programming. This includes the noontime Wisconsin Weather Experts program devoted exclusively to weather discussion, along with Wisconsin Live Desk, which carries local and LiveNOW from Fox news programming while the regular channel airs syndicated programming, and other digital-only programs such as podcasts and 1st and North, a football-related show where sports anchors from the for Fox-owned stations throughout the NFC North discuss both the division and the NFL. FoxLocal Milwaukee also simulcasts on several FAST platforms, including YouTube.

In 2018 and 2019, to tie into high-profile Packer games ending in prime time Sunday nights, the station delayed The Simpsons to air in late night to carry extended local postgame coverage. The practice was temporarily suspended in the 2020 and 2021 seasons due to the league's COVID media restrictions making a live postgame from the game site impossible and resumed in 2022.

WITI's newscasts overall have typically finished in third place, behind WTMJ-TV and WISN-TV, although, in the main demographic ratings that advertisers use, the three stations are much closer with any three placing first in selected newscast, and like most Fox affiliate newscasts in prime time, the 9 p.m. newscasts often can outrate the 10 p.m. newscasts on Milwaukee's other three stations, along with WITI (in addition to the 9 p.m. shows from WDJT on WMLW-TV, and WISN's newscast on their True Crime Network subchannel). The station's morning newscast, Fox 6 Wake Up News, usually places first in the 4:30–10 a.m. time period against the national morning programs airing on WTMJ, WISN and WDJT during the 7–9 a.m. slot, whereas WITI's newscast serves as a local alternative to those programs; it competes with a WDJT-produced newscast on WMLW-TV.

==== News department history ====
Channel 6's news department began with the launch of the station in 1956, its newscast was then known as Milwaukee Newsreel. When WITI became a Fox affiliate in 1994, the station adopted a news-intensive schedule, increasing its news programming output from about 25 hours a week to nearly 45 hours. It maintained a news schedule similar to its latter days as a CBS affiliate. All of its existing newscasts were retained. However, it expanded its weekday morning newscast from two hours to three (with an hour added from 8 to 9 a.m.); the weeknight 5 p.m. newscast was expanded from 30 minutes to one hour, forming a 90-minute news block from 5 to 6:30 p.m.; and an hour-long nightly prime time newscast at 9 p.m. was added, leading into the existing 10 p.m. newscast. WITI is one of several Fox stations that offer newscasts in both the final hour of prime time and the traditional late news timeslot, one of the few affiliated with the network that runs a 10 p.m. (or 11 p.m.) newscast seven nights a week and one of the few to continue its Big Three-era 10 p.m. newscast after switching to Fox.

On December 3, 2007, the station's midday newscast was moved from its longtime noon slot to 11 a.m. Two days prior on December 1, the Saturday edition of Wake-Up News was expanded to two hours beginning at 7 a.m.; the Sunday edition was also moved to 7 a.m., but remained one hour long. In addition, Gus Gnorski's Saturday morning DIY program Ask Gus, was put on hiatus, with Gnorski's segments integrated into the Saturday morning newscast; the program's former studio began serving as the new studio for Wake-Up in May 2008. On March 28, 2009, the station suspended its morning and early evening newscasts on weekends during the Great Recession; the weekend morning newscasts were briefly replaced by reruns of Ask Gus on April 4 (Gnorski was forced by his physicians to retire, ending WITI's plans to revive Ask Gus, with the program ending its 15-year run on November 24, 2007).

On December 5, 2009, WITI became the second station in Milwaukee (behind WTMJ-TV) to begin broadcasting its local newscasts in high definition. It was the first (and as of June 28, 2011, the only) television station in the market to provide news video from the field in true high definition, as WITI upgraded its ENG vehicles, satellite truck, studio and field cameras and other equipment in order to broadcast news footage from the field in high definition, in addition to segments broadcast from the main studio. In February 2010, WITI expanded its weekday morning newscast a half-hour early to 4:30 a.m., extending the program to 4 1/2 hours. WITI resumed the Saturday and Sunday morning newscasts (which now aired from 7 to 9 a.m. on both days) after a two-year absence on April 2, 2011. Weekend early evening newscasts were subsequently restored on April 7, 2012.

In December 2012, WITI began construction of a new Studio A set designed by FX Group, to replace the "Milwaukee's Newscenter" set, which had been in use since 1998 and received three refreshes over the course of its use (that set's heavy integration of its 2002 to 2006 horizontal logo resulted in WITI not using the vertical "kitebox" logo of its sister stations under Fox when it began using the standardized O&O graphics in 2007). Its newscasts and Real Milwaukee then temporarily originated from the Studio B set that houses the station's morning newscast (WakeUp News). The new Studio A was partially introduced on February 11, 2013, with modifications to the secondary set continuing for a couple of weeks after. A new graphics package and the debut of a new music package ("Extreme" by Stephen Arnold) was introduced on April 22, 2013. Studio A ended on July 8, 2016, with the 4 p.m. hour converted to a traditional newscast the next Monday, though some Studio A segments and elements will remain. Studio A was again redesigned in the summer of 2019, with updated technology and design tying into a new graphics package (debuted by former sister station WDAF-TV in Kansas City) introduced in October 2019, and by coincidence Arnold's new "Beyond" package mainly utilized by the Fox-owned stations since 2018. A few months before, the station's 20 year-old weather deck received a full-scale overhaul and redesign in a sponsored arrangement with both a deck-building company and a landscaper which handles the station's landscaping services.

Because of the sale to Fox Television Stations making a transition to Nexstar's Frankly platform superfluous, it was the last station in the defunct company to transition from that company's proprietary web platform (both Tribune Media and Fox Television Stations utilize WordPress-hosted websites), doing so on July 29, 2020. The station then transitioned to the standard FTS on-air graphics package on October 28, 2020. The station's weather system did not transition to the same graphics system until July 20, 2022.

==== Notable current on-air staff ====
- Mary Stoker Smith – anchor

==== Notable former on-air staff ====
- Jen Lada – weekend sports anchor (2006–2013)
- Jim Paschke – sportscaster/weekend morning anchor
- Tom Skilling – meteorologist (1975–1978)
- Jane Skinner – anchor (1994–1996)
- Anne State – anchor (2010–2014)
- Clarice Tinsley – anchor/reporter/monthly public affairs show host (1975–1978)
- Carl Zimmermann – longest serving broadcaster in Milwaukee history

== Technical information ==
=== Subchannels ===
Subchannels of WITI and WVCY-TV
| License | Subchannel | Res. | Short name | Programming |
|---|---|---|---|---|
| WITI | 6.1 | 720p | WITI-DT | Fox |
| WITI | 6.2 | 480i | ANT-TV | Antenna TV |
| WITI | 6.3 | 480i | HSN | HSN |
| WITI | 6.4 | 480i | FOX WX | Fox Weather |
| WVCY-TV | 30.1 | 720p | WVCY-TV | Main WVCY-TV programming |

In May 2012, the station activated its second audio program feed three years before FCC requirements for network-provided audio description went into effect for the Milwaukee market, which was done for all Local TV stations at the master control level. The station carries all Fox programming available with Descriptive Video Service audio, along with Spanish-language audio broadcasts of Fox Sports telecasts.

Despite Tribune's purchase of the station, it never carried This TV; Tribune had assumed Weigel Broadcasting's operational responsibilities for that network on November 1, 2013 (the network was carried on WYTU-LD2 from January until September 2018 after several years on WMLW-DT3, before WIWN agreed to carry the network for their fifth subchannel in November 2018 and its sale to Entertainment Studios in 2020). Additionally, Court TV's carriage with Scripps' WTMJ-TV as under sister ownership meant WITI would not carry that network despite Tribune/Nexstar's deal with that network to launch carriage at the end of October 2019.

Fox Television Stations announced before its debut that its stations would carry the streaming service Fox Weather as a subchannel in their local markets at the start of 2022, with WITI doing so on its fourth subchannel in February 2022.

A third subchannel for HSN's over-the-air service was added before the end of 2021 for antenna viewers, with no pay-TV carriage pursued by either FTS or HSN (HSN and sister network QVC usually buy multiple subchannel slots in markets to provide 'best reception' over-the-air service to their viewers, in addition to cable and streaming coverage).

=== Analog-to-digital conversion ===
WITI ended regular programming on its analog signal, over VHF channel 6, on June 12, 2009, the official date on which full-power television stations in the United States transitioned from analog to digital broadcasts under federal mandate. The station's digital signal continued to broadcast on its pre-transition UHF channel 33, using virtual channel 6.

As part of the SAFER Act, WITI kept its analog signal on the air until June 25 to inform viewers of the digital television transition through a loop of English and Spanish public service announcements from the National Association of Broadcasters, although this loop was interrupted several times during the period to run severe weather coverage.

The digital transition resulted in the loss of ability to listen to WITI's audio feed over 87.7 FM; television stations broadcasting on VHF channel 6 were audible over this frequency during the analog television era, although this is no longer possible due to the transition, even for stations that broadcast their digital signals on channel 6. While at least one station offered a separate broadcast on 87.7, WITI opted to restore the audio feed via an HD Radio subchannel of WMIL-FM (106.1) in August 2009 through an agreement to provide news and weather content for WMIL owner Clear Channel Communications's Milwaukee radio cluster (a forecast-only content agreement between WITI and Entercom's three local stations and occasional check-ins during WakeUp News on WXSS and WSSP's morning shows continues without any audible forecasts from channel 6's weather staff). WITI is one of the few stations that had broadcast on VHF channel 6 prior to the digital transition to restore its audio feed legally; WRGB in Albany, New York attempted an audio subcarrier service after the transition that was subsequently pulled at the FCC's request. The rebroadcast with WMIL-HD3 was eventually ended down the line for one of iHeartRadio's automated formats.

WITI's digital signal ran at low power until November 2009, due to the digital antenna being located lower than the former analog antenna on the WITI Tower (this setup was common during the digital transition among Fox O&O-turned-Local TV stations; the station had originally transmitted its HD signal on low power from its STL tower in Brown Deer until HD equipment was installed on the main tower in late 2004). That antenna was removed in September, with the digital antenna being moved higher in October, causing some signal interruptions, along with affecting the operations of WUWM (89.7 FM), which transmits its signal on the tower.

=== Channel sharing with WVCY-TV ===
On November 22, 2017, FCC documentation was released confirming that WITI would begin to share their channel bandwidth with independent religious station WVCY-TV (channel 30) on January 8, 2018. WVCY has retained its existing FCC license and must-carry rights, and continues to identify as channel 30 over-the-air as part of the WITI channel share. The station remained in standard definition until September 25, 2024, when it began to broadcast in HD over 30.1.
