= Leota School for Girls =

Residential building in Evansville, Wisconsin, U.S.

Coordinates: 42°46′25.1″N 89°18′05.3″W

The former Leota School for Girls, also known as the Bones School, is a historic Victorian architecture residential building completed in 1910 in Evansville, Wisconsin at 443 South First Street. It was originally constructed as a home. The home was sold in 1934 to William and Jenny Bone who opened the school. They also operated the Leota Camp based at the home. The school closed in 1959.

== See also ==
- Evansville's Historic District
