= Almeron =

Almeron is a given name. Notable people with the name include:

- Almeron Marks (1804–1853), American politician who represented Greene County in the 70th New York State Legislature
- Almeron Eager (1838–1902), American farmer and politician from Wisconsin

== See also ==
- Almaron Dickinson (1800–1836), an American soldier killed in the Battle of the Alamo
