= Marion Clinch Calkins =

American poet

- Born: Marion Clinch Calkins; 15 July 1895; Evansville, Wisconsin
- Died: 26 December 1968 (aged 73); McLean, Virginia
- Citizenship: American
- Education: University of Wisconsin
- Spouse: Charles Marquis Merrell

Marion Clinch Calkins (July 15, 1895 – December 26, 1968) was an American poet, writer, and teacher who taught English and Art History at the University of Wisconsin and wrote about the labor movement, industrial espionage, and fascism in America.

== Biography ==
Marion Clinch Calkins was born on July 15, 1895, in Evansville, Wisconsin, the daughter of Julia Clinch and Judson Wells Calkins. After graduation from the University of Wisconsin in 1918, Calkins worked in a Milwaukee artillery shell packing plant, before returning to her alma mater to teach English and art history. Around this time, Calkins entered the annual poetry competition held by the Nation, submitting her poem I Was a Maiden under the name of Clinch Calkins because she wanted her authorship to be gender neutral. Oswald Garrison Villard, the editor, awarded the poem third prize but did not publish it for fear that its content was too avant garde and would cost the magazine its mailing privileges. The poem was eventually published together with Calkins' early collected verse in Poems (1928). Calkins' poetry, as well as humorous rhymes under the name Majollica Wattles, was published in The New Yorker; and her short stories appeared in Town and Country Magazine.

During the mid-twenties, Calkins lived in New York City working as a vocational counselor and social worker at Lillian Wald's Henry Street Settlement. In 1927, Calkins worked with art historian Richard Offner (1889-1965) in Florence, Italy, on what would become his magnum opus the Critical and Historical Corpus of Florentine Painting.

Although Calkins considered poetry to be her favorite literary medium, her most critically acclaimed book was Some Folks Won't Work (1930), a seminal document on the Depression, based on 300 individual case histories of the effects of unemployment. Published a year following the Wall Street Crash, the book received accolades on the front page of the New York Times Book Review, and brought Calkins national attention along with an invitation from Harry Hopkins to work with the Federal Emergency Relief Administration (FERA). Calkins traveled across country reporting on socio-economic conditions and ghost-writing for Hopkins.

In 1936, Calkins worked for Senator Robert La Follette's Civil Liberties Committee which investigated workers' union civil rights. Calkins wrote the committee's report and expanded her observations in Spy Overhead (1937), the first book to examine labor movement sabotage and industrial espionage. During the thirties, Calkins also became friends and worked closely with Henry Alsberg, director of the Federal Writers' Project.

Other works of social commentary included the verse drama, State Occasion written in 1939 in response to American fascism. The play was optioned in 1943 by Broadway producer Lee Simonson, but was not performed until 1946, when it was produced and directed by Alan Schneider at Catholic University in Washington, D.C.

Following the Second World War, Calkins devoted much of her time assisting on a biography of the wireless and telegraph inventor Guglielmo Marconi (1874-1937), authored by his daughter Degna. Calkins' poetry continued to be published in the Botteghe di Oscure, and in a second collection, Strife of Love in a Dream (1965). She also published two novels satirizing the local Washington pastime of fox-hunting and socialite lifestyle: Lady on the Hunt (1950), and Calendar of Love (1952).

In 1929, Clinch Calkins married Charles Marquis Merrell, the grandson of Jacob Spencer Merrell, founder of J.S. Merrell Drug Company in St. Louis, Missouri. The business was later operated by the latter's son George until it was sold to McKesson and Robbins. Mark Merrell headed the drug industry division of the National Recovery Act (NRA).

Calkins resided in McLean, Virginia, until her death on December 26, 1968.

== Works or publications ==
- Poems, New York: A.A. Knopf, 1928, OCLC 2699631
- Clinch Calkins; Helen Hall (1930), Some Folks Won't Work, New York: Harcourt, Brace, OCLC 2621050
- Calkins, Clinch (1933), Youth Never Comes Again, New York City: The Committee on Unemployed Youth, OCLC 7399808 – via Committee on Unemployed Youth
- Spy Overhead, the Story of Industrial Espionage, New York: Harcourt, Brace and Co., 1937, OCLC 311530
- Lady on the Hunt, New York: Harper, 1950, OCLC 1460337
- Calendar of Love : a Novel, New York: Simon and Schuster, 1952, OCLC 892522
- Strife of Love in a Dream, New York: Vantage Press, 1965, OCLC 2094703
- In Memory of Clinch Calkins : Unpublished Poems, Place of publication not identified: [publisher not identified], 1969, OCLC 32976283
- Spy Overhead, 1971, OCLC 709714914
