= Almeron Eager =

American farmer, merchant, and politician

Almeron Eager (March 14, 1838 – October 15, 1902) was an American farmer, merchant, and politician.

Born in Sangerfield, New York, Eager moved to Wisconsin, in 1854, and settled on a farm in the town of Union, Rock County, Wisconsin. In 1868, Eager moved to Evansville, Wisconsin. He was also a merchant, tobacco buyer, and was president of the Baker Manufacturing Company. Eager served as town treasurer and then as trustee and president of the village of Evansville, Wisconsin. Eager also served on the Rock County, Wisconsin Board of Supervisors and was a Republican. From 1901 until his death in 1902, Eager served in the Wisconsin State Assembly. Eager died at his home in Evansville, Wisconsin.
