= Union, Rock County, Wisconsin =

Town of Union
- Town
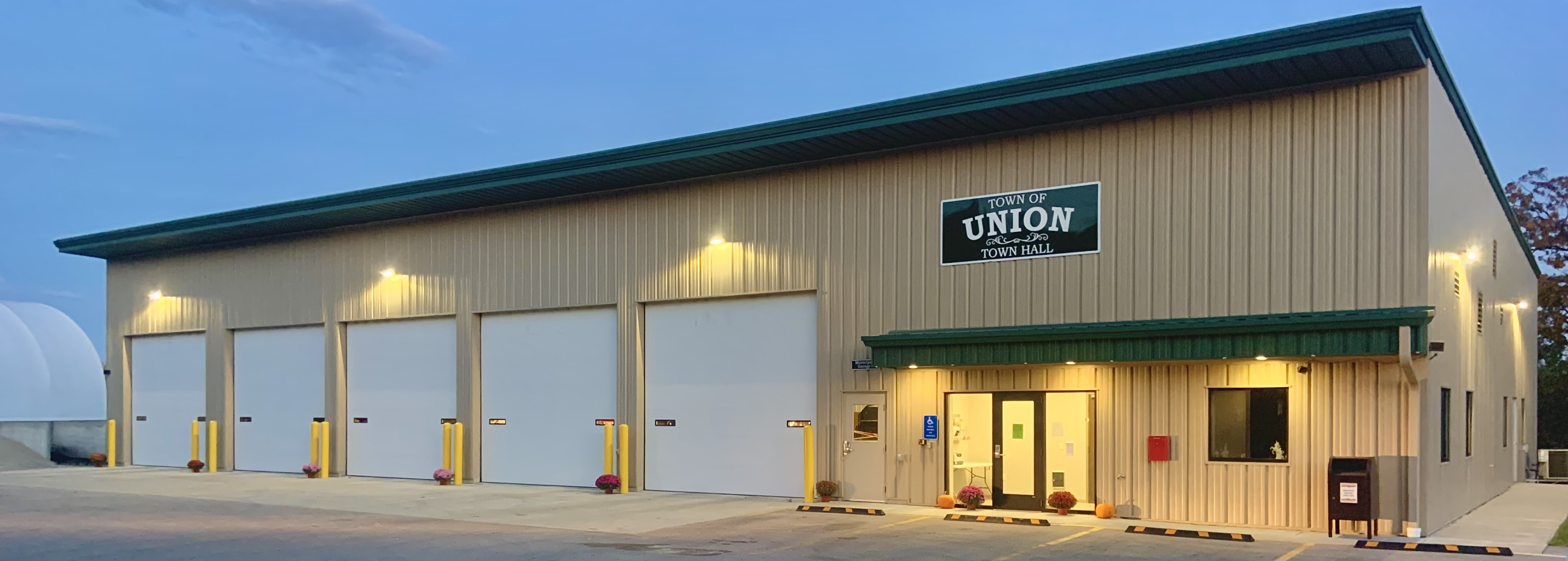
- Town hall

- Location of the Town of Union in Rock County and the state of Wisconsin.
- Coordinates: 42°48′27″N 89°17′57″W
- Country: United States
- State: Wisconsin
- County: Rock

Area
  - Total: 34.1 sq mi (88.3 km^{2})
  - Land: 34.1 sq mi (88.2 km^{2})
  - Water: 0.039 sq mi (0.1 km^{2})
- Elevation: 928 ft (283 m)

Population (2020)
  - Total: 2,104
  - Density: 61.8/sq mi (23.9/km^{2})
- Time zone: UTC-6 (Central (CST))
  - Summer (DST): UTC-5 (CDT)
- Area code: 608
- FIPS code: 55-81650
- GNIS feature ID: 1584313
- Website: https://www.tn.union.wi.gov/

The Town of Union is located in Rock County, Wisconsin, United States. The population was 2,104 at the 2020 census. The town surrounds the city of Evansville.

== Geography ==
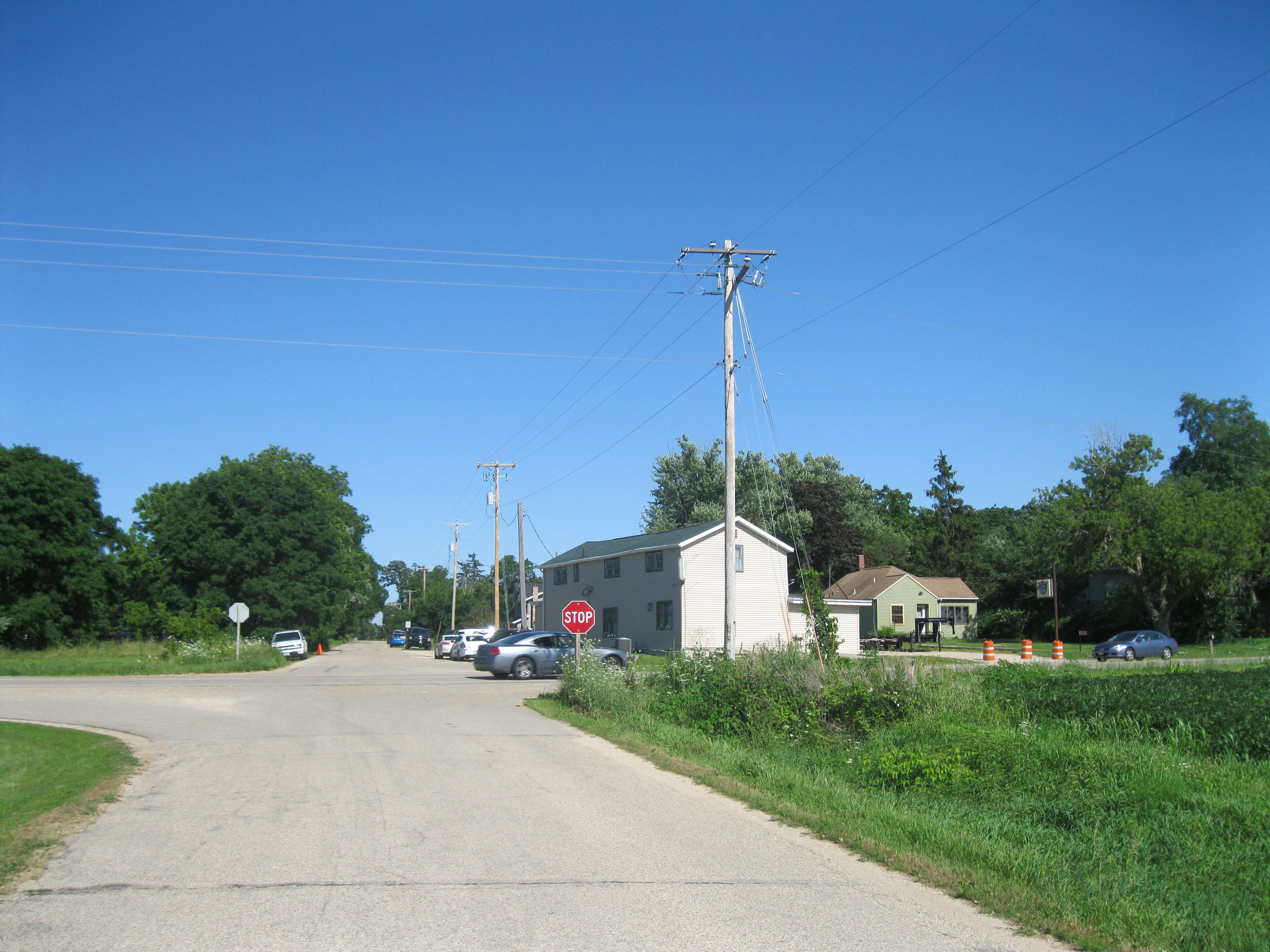
Looking east at the unincorporated community of Union, located within the Town of Union

According to the United States Census Bureau, the town has a total area of 34.1 square miles (88.3 km^{2}), of which, 34.1 square miles (88.2 km^{2}) of it is land and 0.04 square miles (0.1 km^{2}) of it (0.09%) is water.

== Demographics ==
As of the census of 2000, there were 1,860 people, 693 households, and 539 families residing in the town. The population density was 54.6 people per square mile (21.1/km^{2}). There were 718 housing units at an average density of 21.1 per square mile (8.1/km^{2}).The racial makeup of the town was 97.47% White, 0.16% African American, 0.22% Native American, 0.70% Asian, 0.43% from other races, and 1.02% from two or more races. Hispanic or Latino of any race were 0.54% of the population.

There were 693 households, out of which 39.8% had children under the age of 18 living with them, 67.0% were married couples living together, 6.2% had a female householder with no husband present, and 22.1% were non-families. 17.0% of all households were made up of individuals, and 4.3% had someone living alone who was 65 years of age or older. The average household size was 2.68 and the average family size was 3.02.

In the town, the population was spread out, with 27.3% under the age of 18, 6.4% from 18 to 24, 31.6% from 25 to 44, 25.6% from 45 to 64, and 9.0% who were 65 years of age or older. The median age was 38 years. For every 100 females, there were 105.5 males. For every 100 females age 18 and over, there were 104.5 males.

The median income for a household in the town was $55,385, and the median income for a family was $60,208. Males had a median income of $39,185 versus $31,211 for females. The per capita income for the town was $22,609. About 2.0% of families and 3.6% of the population were below the poverty line, including 4.2% of those under age 18 and none of those age 65 or over.

== Notable people ==
- Benjamin Watson Hubbard, politician, lived in the Town of Union
- Burr W. Jones, politician and jurist, was born in the Town of Union
