= Carl Zimmermann (news anchor) =

American journalist

Carl G. Zimmerman
- Born: March 26, 1918; Milwaukee, Wisconsin
- Died: April 11, 2014 (aged 96); Milwaukee, Wisconsin
- Burial place: Wisconsin Memorial Park; 43.08918°N 88.07663°W
- Education: University of Wisconsin–Milwaukee
- Occupation: Journalist
- Years active: c. 1936–1986
- Employer: WITI (1959 - 1986)
- Television: The Big Picture
- Spouse: Doris Zimmerman (née Loftis) (m. 1942)
- Children: 5
- Military career
- Branch: U.S. Army
- Service years: 1942–1945; 1950–1953
- Rank: Captain
- Awards: Bronze Star Medal (1945)

Carl G. Zimmermann (March 26, 1918 – April 11, 2014), nicknamed the "Dean of Milwaukee News," was an American television journalist, news anchor and World War II (WW2) war correspondent. Zimmermann had the longest on-air broadcasting career in the history of the Milwaukee media market, having spent more than 50 years at television and radio stations in the Milwaukee metropolitan area, most notably at WITI.

== Career ==
Zimmerman showed a passion for news broadcasting even as a young boy. When he was 12, he staged a broadcast for his family from the living room. After each show, his father would provide feedback and criticism. A year later, Zimmerman's father died, and he attempted to find a job as a radio announcer but was rejected. In order to provide for his family, he worked any odd jobs that would hire a 13-year old. His reporting career officially began when he took a part-time job at the radio station WEMP, which eventually became a full-time position. He says he got the job at WEMP by being persistent and refusing to take "no" for an answer — "I stood out in the office for a long, long time [...] I wanted this job and I said 'I'm staying here until you hire me.' So I was there every day after school, and in the morning."

Zimmerman enlisted in the U.S. Army in 1942. Due to his broadcasting experience, he became a U.S. Army combat war correspondent, where he worked alongside Edward R. Murrow and Eric Sevareid. He was a regular correspondent on NBC's "Army Hour", filing reports from North Africa, Sicily, Italy (including the liberation of Rome), France and Germany during WW2. In 1944, he organized the first live broadcast of an army landing.

In 1945, Zimmerman's contract with the army ended and he returned to work at WEMP. However, his work there was interrupted a second time when the army recalled him to serve in the Korean War as a war correspondent. During that time he co-created and produced the war documentary television series The Big Picture, appearing in several episodes as a narrator or presenter. In a 1989 interview, he described the process of making The Big Picture:

We wanted to get the army on television, what was happening over in Korea. And the only thing I could think of was the Signal Corps film footage. They were shooting a lot of film over there and it never got anywhere. So I said 'Let's get that film, we'll edit it, and do a half-hour weekly show.'

After the war, Zimmerman again returned to WEMP, then worked brief stints at WFOX and WRAC before WITI hired him as news director in 1959. WITI was preparing to switch from being an independent television station to the local CBS affiliate, and Zimmerman established the station's news room with the help of Lil Kleiman. While working at WITI, Zimmerman held many job titles, including news anchor, reporter, news director, and director of communications. He remained at WITI until his retirement in 1986, although he still occasionally served as a reporter emeritus and as a mentor to some of the younger staff at the station.

According to Zimmerman's son Jack, Zimmerman briefly considered running for Congress, but decided against it.

Over his career, Zimmerman won many awards and honors. In 1945, he was awarded the Bronze Star Medal for his reporting during WW2. In 1984, he won the Abe Lincoln Award "for exceptional programming on radio and TV." He was inducted into The Milwaukee Press Club Hall of Fame and The Wisconsin Broadcasters Hall of Fame in 1988 and 1989, respectively. In 2011, he took part in the Stars and Stripes Honor Flight to Washington, D.C. He also won the Alfred P. Sloan Foundation award for creative editorial writing.

== Personal life ==
=== Marriage and family ===
Carl Zimmermann married Doris Ann Loftis in 1942, just one week before he left to serve in World War II. Their marriage lasted for decades and she played a major role in supporting the family during his demanding journalism career. During his long working hours in television news, his wife often managed family responsibilities and raised their children while he worked 60-hour weeks, showing the sacrifices behind his professional success.

The couple had five children: Jack, Scott, Richard, Mary Beth Nichols, and Susan Klein, and later also had grandchildren and great-grandchildren.

=== Military service ===
Zimmermann joined the U.S. Army in 1942 during World War II and became a combat war correspondent because of his radio broadcasting experience. He reported directly from war zones such as North Africa, Italy, France, and Germany, and his reports were broadcast on major American radio networks.

After returning to civilian life, he was called back to serve again during the Korean War (1950–1953), making him one of the few journalists to serve as a war correspondent in two major wars.

=== Death ===
Carl Zimmermann died on April 11, 2014 at the age of 96 in Milwaukee, Wisconsin. According to obituary reports, the cause of death was pneumonia and heart-related illness. At the time of his death, he had been living with his wife at the Milwaukee Catholic Home, where he spent his later years.
