= John Baker (Wisconsin politician) =

American politician

John S. Baker was an American politician. He was a member of the Wisconsin State Assembly.

== Biography ==
Baker was born on July 17, 1869, in Evansville, Wisconsin. His father, Allen S. Baker, was also a member of the Assembly.

== Career ==
Baker was a member of the Assembly during the 1927 session. He was a Republican.
