= Byron Andrews =

Byron Andrews (October 25, 1852 – October 15, 1910) was an American journalist for Chicago Inter Ocean and National Tribune, private secretary to U.S. President Ulysses S. Grant on his Industrial Excursions to Mexico and Cuba, a statesman, a lecturer and an author. He was third owner of the National Tribune newspaper and publishing company in Washington, D.C.

== Early life and family ==
Byron Andrews, B.A., M.A., L.H.D. was born on October 25, 1852, in Argyle, Wisconsin. He was the eldest child of John Cain Andrews (born in Norwalk, Ohio) and Sarah Wright (born in Barlestone, England). His siblings were Marilla Andrews (wife of Edward Lyon Buchwalter), Eleanora Andrews, Jerome Andrews and Cassian Andrews. In 1868, his family moved to Evansville, Wisconsin. He would later marry Belle Fisk.

=== Education ===
In 1865, the Andrews family moved to the small town, Evansville, Wisconsin, built a five bedroom house at 262 West Church St., for the purpose of Byron and his four siblings to attend the Evansville Seminary of Wisconsin that was established by the local Methodist church to educate students for entrance into college. After graduation in 1871, he moved to Geneva, New York where in 1875, earned a B.A. degree in journalism at Hobart College, now known as Hobart and William Smith Colleges. Later in 1900 he earn an honorary degree of the said college.,

== Career ==
Byron Andrews went directly from college to newspaper work and served as a reporter on the Chicago Daily News. Then for four years, he was the Washington correspondent of the Chicago Inter Ocean and the St. Paul Pioneer Press. In 1880 he accompanied U.S. President, General Ulysses S. Grant, on a tour through the West Indies, Mexico and Cuba as his secretary and as correspondent, of the Chicago Inter Ocean and New York Tribune. As early as 1880, he was advertising representative for newspapers National Tribune, American Farmer and Boston Commonwealth in offices of the World Building (a.k.a. Pulitzer Building) in New York City. In 1884 Byron Andrews accepted the position of editor for the National Tribune of Washington, D.C. at a salary of $5000 a year and a percent of the profits. By 1897 became one of the three owners of the said newspaper/publishing company. He also filled many public positions of trust.

=== Ancestry ===
Byron Andrews grandparents were Thomas Browne Andrews (born in Baltimore, Maryland) and Mary (Cain) Andrews (who immigrated from Ireland) in 1805 to Baltimore. Moses Andrews, born in Cecil County, Maryland, was his great, grandfather whose brother was the notable Rev. John Andrews (clergyman), D.D., all direct descendants of Anthony Andrews (High Sheriff of Rutland), England, father of Edward Andrews (High Sheriff of Rutland).

=== Death ===
Byron Andrews died on October 15, 1910. He is buried at the Highland Cemetery, Fort Mitchell, Kenton County, Kentucky, USA

== His publications ==
- The Eastern Conflict;Notes on the Russio-Turkish War.Published by Rhodes & McClure, Chicago, 1877.
- Biography of John A. Logan; and One of the People.
- Life and Speeches of William McKinley; With a Brief Sketch of Garrett A. Hobart.:
- The Facts about the Candidate, The Facts about the Candidate. Published 1904.
- The Story of Cuba;
- President Monroe and His Doctrine;
- Various historical and controversial pamphlets.

== Scholarship ==
The Byron Andrews Scholarship Fund. A fund founded by Mrs. Belle Fisk Andrews, to provide scholarships "For ambitious and needy students, who desire to pursue courses in English, Latin, Journalism, History, Literature or Political Science."
