= Allen S. Baker =

American politician

Allen S. Baker (January 12, 1842 – January 1916), was an American politician and member of the Wisconsin State Assembly. He was born near what is now Evansville, Wisconsin.

== Background ==
During the American Civil War, he served with the 2nd Wisconsin Volunteer Infantry Regiment. He died of influenza.

Baker's son, John Baker, would also become a member of the Assembly.

=== Assembly career ===
Baker was a member of the Assembly during the 1905 and 1907 sessions. He was a Republican.
