= National Tribune =

National newspapers published in the United States

National Tribune was an independent newspaper and publishing company owned by the National Tribune Company, formed in 1877 in Washington, D.C.

== Overview ==
The National Tribune (official title) was a post-Civil War newspaper based in Washington, D.C., published by the National Tribune Publishing Co. "A Monthly Journal devoted to the interests of the Soldiers and Sailors of the late war, and all Pensioners of the United States" was the caption under the paper's title. The National Tribune served generally as the organ of the Grand Army of the Republic, (G.A.R.) and as a forum for old soldiers to share their reminiscences.

The National Tribune Publishing Co. also printed historical publications, from pamphlets to hard-bound books, and ephemera empathizing on articles, stories and histories of heroes and political figures, as well as Union and Confederate soldiers and armies. In more modern times, the journal evolved to its modern version, what is now Stars and Stripes.

The newspaper was daily until 1917, when it went to weekly. It merged with Stars and Stripes (newspaper) in the 1920s. Publication ceased in 1943.

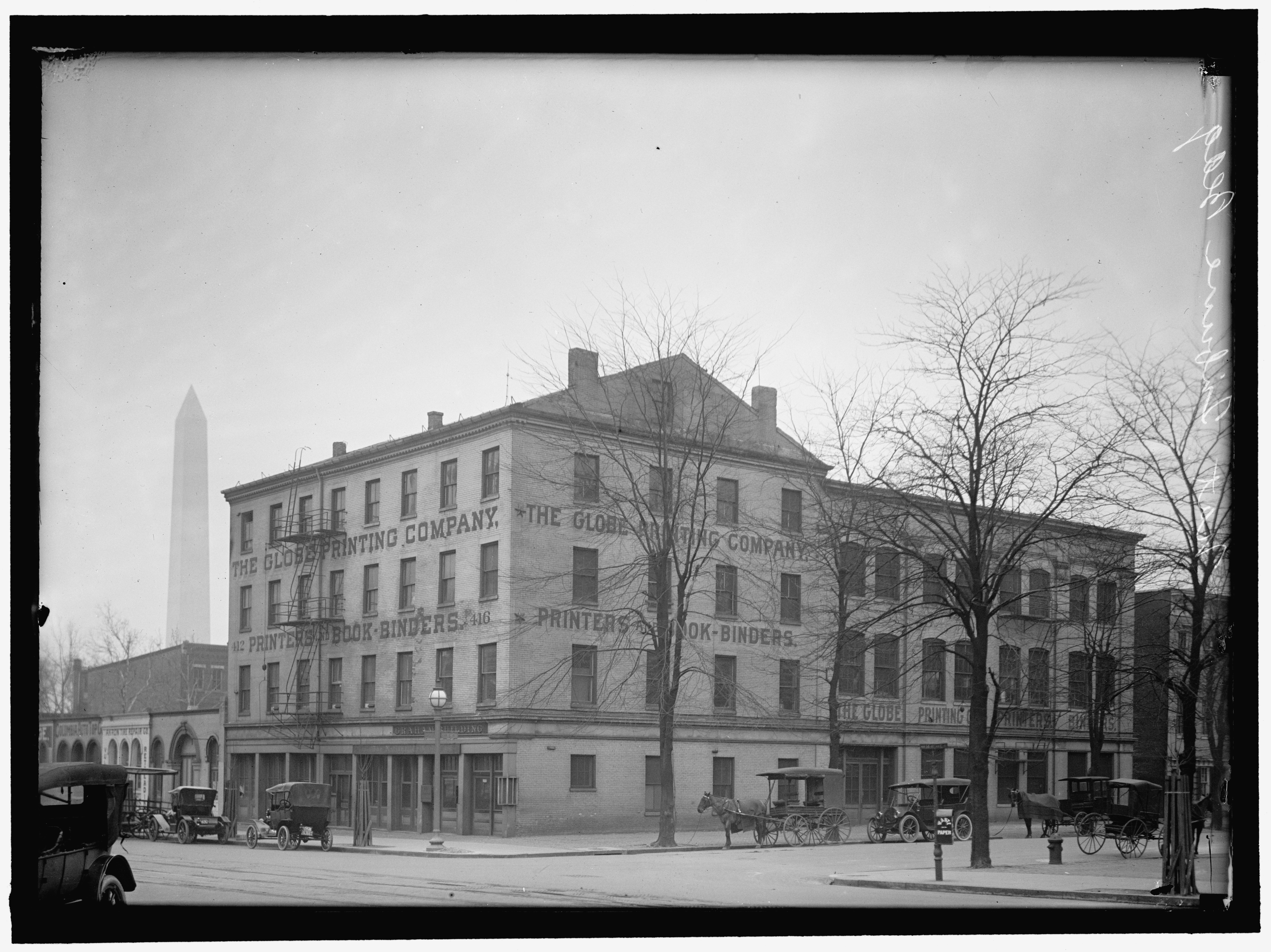
Building in Washington

== Founding of the company ==
The National Tribune was first published in 1877. Its owner and editor was George E. Lemon. The paper was headquartered at 615 Fifteenth St. NW, Washington, D.C., in an area considered "D.C.'s Newspaper Row", located just five blocks from the White House. The 8-page, 18" by 23"-sheet newspaper was distributed every Thursday, year-round. An annual subscription for the monthly journal was $1.00; one copy was 10 cents. By 1890, the yearly circulation was 135,342. On August 20, 1881, through July 12, 1917, the paper evolved into a weekly publication. Its main subscribers were war veterans. The title, "The National Tribune" was used from 1877 to 1917 before it was restructured. An alternative title was United States National Tribune.

In 1884, John McElroy, after being editor for ten years of the Ohio-based newspaper,Toledo Blade, joined the company as managing editor and built up its reputation and nationwide distribution.

Byron Andrews, a native of Evansville, Wisconsin, and an 1876 graduate of Hobart College in Geneva, N.Y., came aboard in 1884 as business manager in New York City office (66, World Building) of the National Tribune and a subsidiary news journal, The American Farmer. Prior to this, Andrews was with the Chicago journal Chicago Inter Ocean for many years as its correspondent in Washington, D.C.. He had also served as private secretary to U.S. President Ulysses S. Grant on industrial excursions to Mexico, Cuba and abroad.

In April 1893, Marilla Andrews, Byron's sister of, was appointed editor of the American Farmer. "She is a lady of brilliant attainments, and will make her mark in the literary world. Women, evidently, are coming to the front." (The Items of Interest. A Monthly Magazine of Dental Art, Science and Literature, 1893.)

In its heyday, the Tribune was one of the top-paying newspaper properties in the country, at one time having a circulation of 250,000. A silver medal was issued by The New York World to commemorate its reaching this circulation. This was presented by G.W. Turner through Byron Andrews, associate editor of the company based in New York.

In December 1896, George E. Lemon died and buried in historic Rock Creek Cemetery in D.C. not far from the grave of Henry Adams. Immediately following his death, the company was sold and reorganized.

== New owners ==
After Lemon's death, the firm of McElroy, Shoppell and Andrews (John McElroy, Robert W. Shoppell and Byron Andrews), acquired the National Tribune Publishing Co. in April 1897. Robert W. Shoppell was a former publisher, while Byron Andrews had been an associate editor and business manager for The National Tribune and The American Farmer (also owned by George E. Lemon & Co.) in New York for 15 years. The most prominent of the trio was John L. McElroy, who after ten years as managing editor of the Toledo Blade had assumed the same position with the National Tribune in 1884 and had served as president of the National Association of Ex-Prisoners of War. The changes under the new management, which by the close of the century was emphasizing that "it has not the slightest connection of any kind with a pension attorney or firm of attorneys" were that the paper now serialized several of McElroy's own novels and made hesitant bids to the members of the D.A.R. and S.A.R.

The National Tribune's circulation by 1899 was 112,000.

In 1885, the company began publishing and printing non-fictional "Standard books" of the general history, soldier life and adventures and important places pertaining to the Civil War, as well as other unrelated informative books. Most of the books were softback, sold for 25 to 50 cents, and were only available through the National Tribune. Their concept was that retail prices were so low to allow wholesale prices, therefore they did not sell to bookstores and newsstands. They usually advertised all of their other publications in the inside of the books' front and back covers. By 1899, they ceased selling and advertised at the end of the back inside cover "Terms: The foregoing books are not for sale. They are published for the sole purpose of rewarding those who raise clubs for The National Tribune. It is very easy to raise a club. Send for sample copies of the paper". Most copies were bound in leatherette covers.

=== Bio of Byron Andrews (1852-1910) ===
In 1902, Andrews retired and sold his interest to McElroy and Shoppell.

=== Bio of John L. McElroy (1846-1929) ===
==== Civil War experience ====
John L. McElroy was born August 25, 1846, in Greenup, Kentucky, and grew up in Chicago, Illinois.

He enlisted in the American Civil War on March 29, 1863, as a private. On April 16, 1863, he mustered into the "L" Co. Illinois 16th Cavalry. He was promoted to hospital steward on September 9, 1863. He served with the Intra Regimental Company and transferred September 9. 1863 from company L to Field & Staff. He was captured as was a POW on January 3, 1864, in Jonesville, Virginia, then confined on January 6, 1864, in Libby Prison, Richmond, Virginia. He was moved on March 1, 1864, to Andersonville Prison Camp in Andersonville, Georgia, what is now the Andersonville National Historic Site. He survived and mustered out on May 20, 1865. He died October 29, 1929, in Washington, D.C., and was buried at Arlington National Cemetery.

== Publications of The National Tribune Publishing Co. ==
=== Newspapers ===
- (1877–1881) Monthly printing of The National Tribune newspaper.
- (1881–1917) Weekly printing of The National Tribune newspaper.

=== Books ===
- (1883) History One Hundred Sixth Regiment Pennsylvania Volunteers
- (1884) Life And Services of Gen John A. Logan, The Soldier and Statesman. By George Francis Dawson. 467 pages.
- (1885) Capturing a Locomotive by Rev. William Pittenger. 354pp. Hardback.
- (1890) The Cannoneer; Recollections of Service in the Army of the Potomac.
- (1890) Mrs. Clarke's Cook Book by Mrs Benjamin Harrison. 256pp.
- (1893) Dream of The Ages: A Poem of Columbia. Kate Brownlee Sherwood. 80 pages.
- (1896) The Story of Cuba by Byron Andrews.
- (1897) Adventures of Alf Wilson written himself.by Alf Wilson.
- (1897) Si Klegg: His Transformation From A Recruit To A Veteran by John McElroy. 5 1/4 x 7 3/4 soft bound. 319 pages.
- (1898) The Great Rebellion (Volume 1); A History of the Civil War in the United States.
- (1898) National Tribune Soldier's Handbook: Containing a Compilation of the Pension and Other Laws, and Rulings of the Departments, of Interest to Soldiers and Sailors and Their Heirs, and Information of Special Value are Entitled To. By McElroy, Shoppell & Andrews, Washington, D.C.
- (1898) Si Klegg;: His Development From a Raw Recruit to a Veteran, and Other Stories. by John McElroy. Third edition was in 1910.
- (1899) Historic Homes in Washington, Its Noted Men and Women and a Century in the White House by Mary S. Lockwood. 336pp.
- (1898) A Personal History of Ulysses S. Grant by Albert D. Richardson.
- (1899) Manning's Book:Cattle, Sheep, Swine, Poultry, Bees, Dogs, Pigeons and Pets. New Edition. By J.Russell Manning, M.D.V.S., D.A. Jones, and George E. Howard. All in one large volume. 576 pages.
- (1899) When and Where We Met Each Other: Battles, Actions, and Skirmishes by Theodore D. Strickler. 220pp. Softcover.
- (1899) Andersonville: Story of Rebel Military Prisons, Fifteen Months a Guest of The So-Called Southern Confederacy. A Private Soldier's Experience in Richmond, Andersonville, Savannah, Millen, Blackshear and Florence. by John McElroy. Two Volumes. Softbound. 2nd printing. Originally published 1870 by D.R. Locke in Toledo, Ohio.
- (1899) When and Where We Met Each Other On Shore & Afloat: Data Concerning the Army Corps and Legends of the Army Corps Badges.
- (1899) The American Conflict. By Horace Greeley, the publisher and owner of the Tribune. Hard cover Complete 2 volumes in 1.
- (1899) The World's Sweetest Songs. copyright 1899 by McElroy, Shoppell & Andrews.
- (1902) Si, Shorty and the Boys on the March to the Sea by John McElroy. 312pp. 1st edition in 1902. Softcover.
- (1909) Abraham Lincoln. Centennial Edition. By Noah Brooks. 467 pages.
- (1909) The Struggle of Missouri. By John McElroy. 342 pages,
- (1910) The Soul Growth of Abraham Lincoln by John McElroy. First published October 15, 1910

=== Ephemera published by The National Tribune ===
- National Tribune War Maps. No.1. The first battle of Bull Run. Supplement of the paper. July 21. 1861. Washington. December 26. 1895.
- Army of the Cumberland Poster/Map. Constituted by General Order No. 57, August 15, 1861. This is to Certify, Sergeant Edwin T. Connell served in the Army of the Cumberland, having been a member of Detachment of Signal Corps at Hd'qrs of, Maj. Gen W.S. Rosecrans. (Signed) B.F. Fisher C. 1904,(with map of Southern States) Field Of Operations. Full color border with U.S. flag design, showing commanders Buell, Thomas, Rosecrans, Stanley, McCook, and Crittenden. Size is 13x20.
