= Benjamin Watson Hubbard =

American politician

Benjamin Watson Hubbard (November 16, 1842 in Cleveland, Ohio – November 2, 1904 in Evansville, Wisconsin) was a member of the Wisconsin State Assembly

== Career ==
Hubbard was elected to the Assembly in 1892. Additionally, he was Assessor of Union, Rock County, Wisconsin in 1890 and a member of the county board of Rock County, Wisconsin in 1891 and 1892. He was a Republican.
