= Martin V. Pratt =

American politician

Martin V. Pratt was a member of the Wisconsin State Assembly.

== Biography ==
Pratt was born on November 10, 1828, in Easton, Massachusetts. He graduated from what is now Bridgewater State University. In 1869, Pratt married Evaline E. Holmes. They would have a daughter. Pratt died in 1898.

== Career ==
Pratt was a member of the Assembly during the 1881 and 1889 sessions. Other positions he held include President (similar to Mayor) of Evansville, Wisconsin. He was a Republican.
