= Emmy Fink =

American journalist

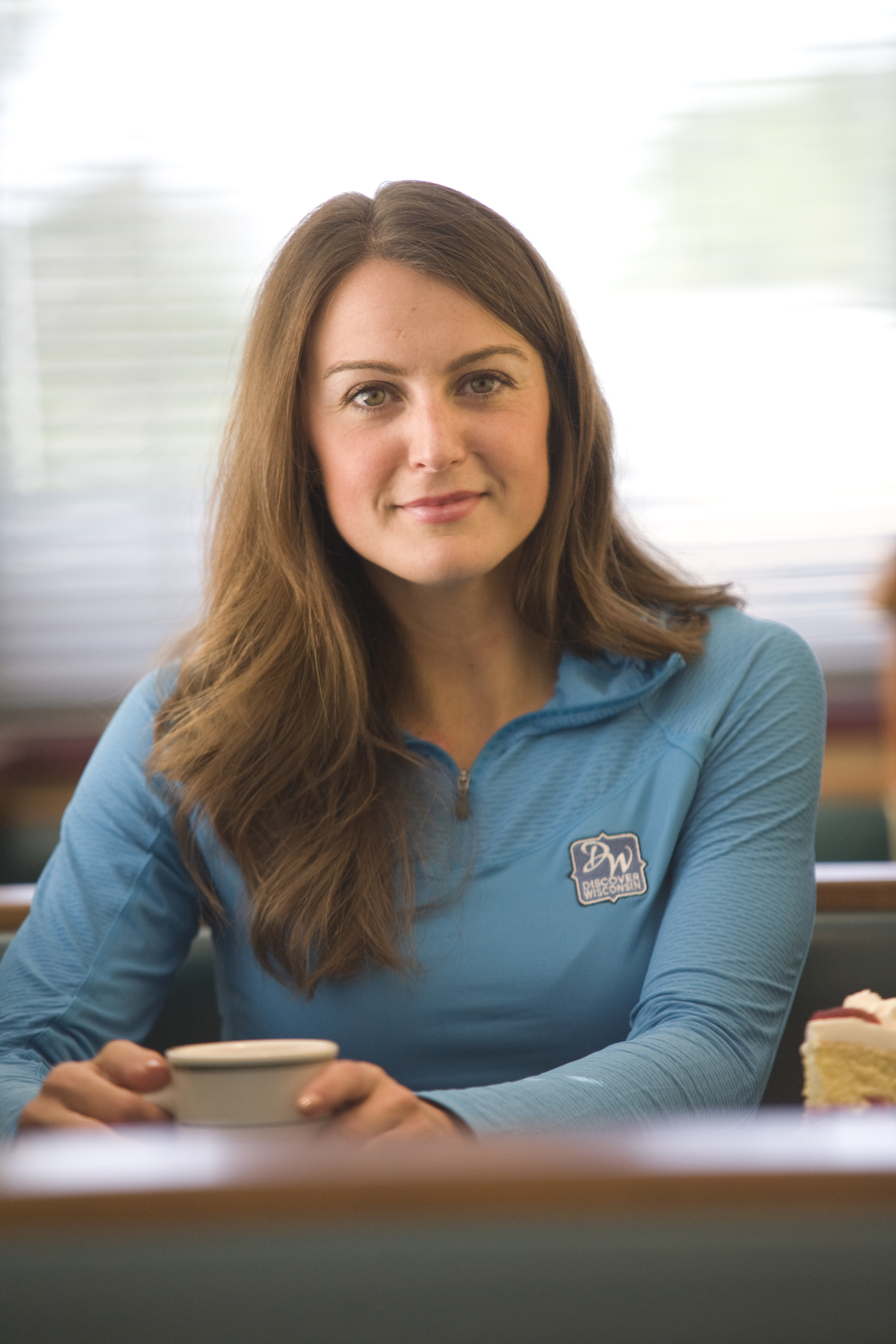
- Fink in 2011
- Born: Emmeline Katherine "Emmy" Fink; Yorkville, Wisconsin
- Education: Wisconsin–Whitewater
- Title: TV Host, Personality
- Family: Parents: Suzy and Gary; sisters: Marly and Haly

Emmeline Katherine "Emmy" Fink is an American broadcast television reporter and presenter. She hosted the tourism show Discover Wisconsin from 2011–2013, as well as other programs in that state.

== Biography ==
Fink was born in Yorkville, Wisconsin, to Gary and Suzy Fink. She is the oldest of three daughters. After attending Union Grove Union High School in Union Grove, she graduated in 2006 from University of Wisconsin–Whitewater where she double majored in Broadcast Journalism and Physical Education. In 2006, she was hired by Madison's CW Television to become their "face of the station".

In the Winter of 2006, Fink won the "spokesmodel" competition at the CW Premiere Party and began her role as a TV personality and producer on January 2, 2007. She reported on community events including high school sports, local news, public interest stories, and "anything local and positive" according to the station. In 2009, Fink won a Silver Medal as the second-place finisher of Madison's Favorite TV Personality from Isthmus' The Daily Page, and a Bronze Medal from Madison Magazine's Best of Madison in that same category.

Fink also served as a freelance reporter and writer with Fox Sports Wisconsin working with the Milwaukee Bucks and Wisconsin Badgers. Her first TV appearance with Fox was on November 16, 2010, during a live broadcast of the Bucks vs. Lakers game. She wrote about special interest stories surrounding the UW athletic program, and appeared in various local events as a host or emcee, including the 2010 WAVE Awards, which recognizes web, audio, and visual excellence in the region. From June 2011 she hosted two seasons of Discover Wisconsin, the longest-running tourism TV show in the U.S.

For five years, Fink has hosted the promotional series “Buzzed into Madison” through WISC-TV, bringing positive stories and features to the Madison viewing area. She is currently the co-host of John McGivern's Main Streets, which she joined in 2023, the show's second season. Her younger sister Marly is also in the journalism industry, and has written for Country Living magazine.
