= Mariah Haberman =

American television host

Mariah Haberman (born January 13, 1988) is the former host of Discover Wisconsin, a tourism TV show. She resides in Madison, Wisconsin.

== Career ==
Haberman's hometown is Evansville, Wisconsin. She graduated from the University of Wisconsin Oshkosh in 2010 with degrees in journalism and advertising.

Haberman competed in beauty pageants through the Miss America organization, winning the title of Miss Wisconsin Central in 2012 and advancing to Miss Wisconsin, where she placed in the top 10. Her platform was "Preventing the Preventable - Drinking and Driving".

After college, she worked for a Chicago marketing firm, then moved to a Madison firm. She was discovered at that firm by Discover Wisconsin; the syndicated show began as a tourism show for the state of Wisconsin in 1987 and Haberman was added as a co-host in 2013. Discover Wisconsin has an estimated audience of 600,000 in the Midwestern United States. She travels throughout Wisconsin taping segments for upcoming episodes. Haberman started the show's blog.
