= Mary Stoker Smith =

American television reporter (born 1969)

- Born: February 11, 1969 (age 57)
- Education: University of Wisconsin–La Crosse; Emerson College
- Occupations: Television news reporter and anchor

Mary Stoker Smith (born February 11, 1969) is an American television news reporter and anchor, currently with WITI, a Fox-owned and operated station in Milwaukee.

== Biography ==
Mary Stoker Smith grew up in La Crosse, Wisconsin. She earned a bachelor's degree from University of Wisconsin–La Crosse, going on to earn a master's degree in Journalism from Emerson College in Boston, Massachusetts.

Stoker Smith won the title of Miss Wisconsin USA in 1996. She went on to represent her state (Wisconsin) in Miss USA 1996, which was held at South Padre Island, Texas, but finished out of the top six.

She was the co-anchor of WPHL-TV's 10 p.m. newscast until December 17, 2005, when she joined CBS's KYW-TV in Philadelphia, Pennsylvania, as a general assignment reporter and a weekend evening anchor.

Stker Smith announced at the end of the 11pm newscast on August 16, 2009, that it would be her last day at the station. She moved to Milwaukee in May 2010 to work as an anchor at WITI.
