= Discover Wisconsin =

- Genre: Travel
- Created by: Dick Rose
- Country of origin: United States

Production
- Production company: Discover MediaWorks

Original release
- Release: 1987 – present

Discover Wisconsin is a weekly, non-fictional, television program which encourages tourism in the U.S. state of Wisconsin. It features profiles of cities, events, and tourist attractions throughout the state. The program is written, directed, and produced in Madison, Wisconsin, and is billed as the longest running tourism TV show in the United States.

The program has won 20 National Television Awards, and has received 8 Emmy nominations, winning once in 2012 for its 25th Anniversary Special.

== History ==
Wisconsin fisherman Dick Rose and future Wisconsin governor, Tommy Thompson, came up with the idea for a show in 1986 to promote tourism to Wisconsin. Discover Wisconsin Television (DW-TV) began in 1987, initially airing on one affiliate in Wausau. The show began as a private partnership with Thompson's administration, and has since become entirely private under the company name Discover MediaWorks.

The show is based out of Madison and Eagle River, and it reaches more than 600,000 viewers throughout the Midwest. This by a combination of network, cable, and satellite stations, as well as online-only sources such as YouTube and Roku. DW-TV is regularly viewed on cable stations throughout the U.S. including markets in Illinois, Michigan, Minnesota, Iowa, Indiana, North Dakota, and South Dakota. Episodes may require a year or more to film and produce before airing, as they often showcase events in a community or region across different times of the year.

Hosts on the show have included Stephanie Klett (1992 Miss Wisconsin and future state Secretary of Tourism), Rick Rose, Emmy Fink, Mariah Haberman, Eric Paulsen, Jake Zimmerman, Collin Geraghty, Marie Justice, Carol Crowe, Susan Shannon, Abbey Maillette, Libby Amato, and Jack Taylor.

== Radio ==
A companion radio program called Discover Wisconsin Radio began in 1993. It is broadcast on over 40 stations in Wisconsin and surrounding states. The program runs Monday to Friday every week on its affiliate stations.
