= Evansville, Wisconsin =

- City
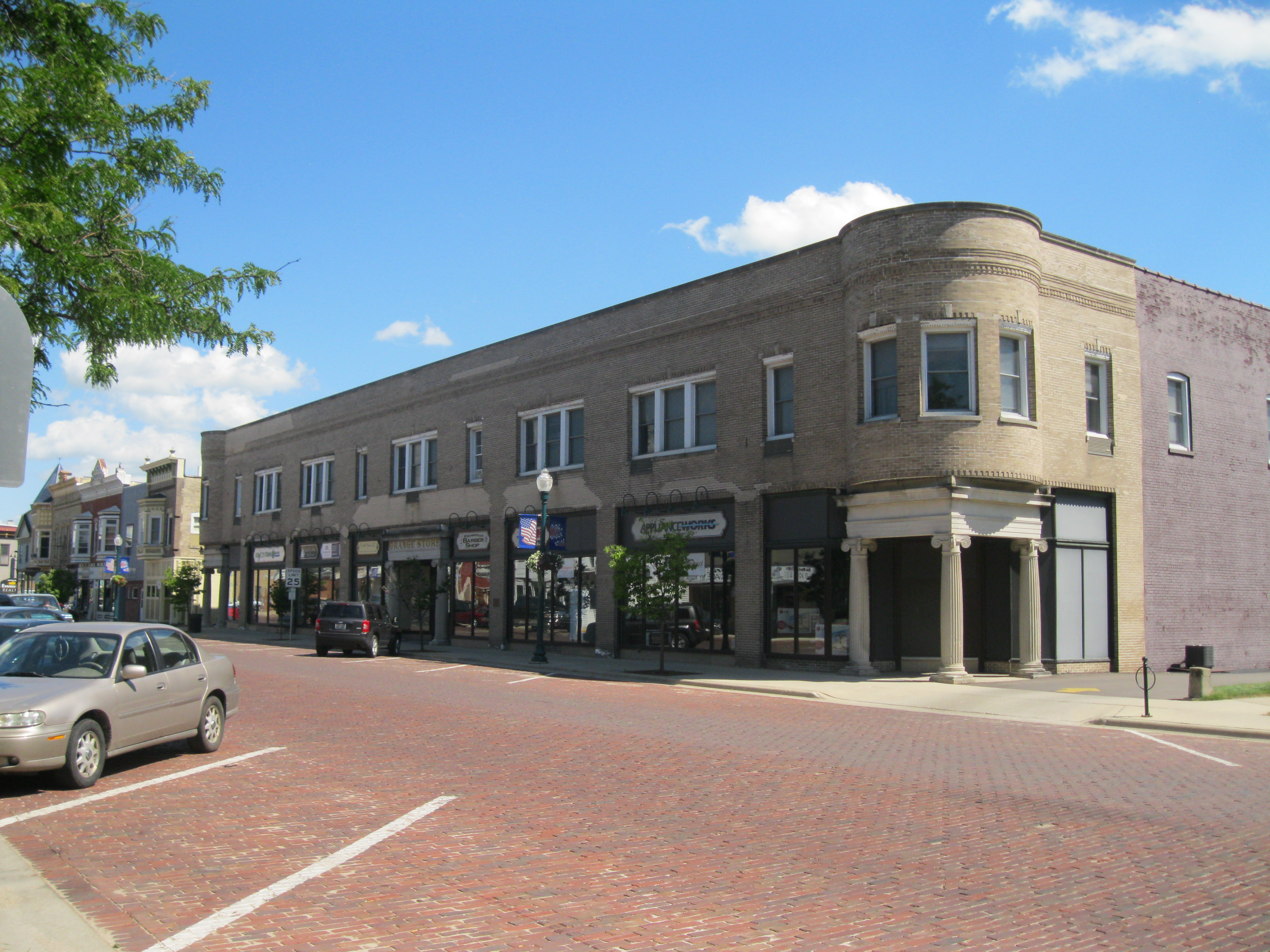
- West Main Street in the Evansville Historic District

- Location of Evansville in Rock County, Wisconsin

- Location within Wisconsin Location within the United States
- Coordinates: 42°46′48″N 89°18′1″W
- Country: United States
- State: Wisconsin
- County: Rock

Area
  - Total: 3.31 sq mi (8.58 km^{2})
  - Land: 3.25 sq mi (8.43 km^{2})
  - Water: 0.058 sq mi (0.15 km^{2})
- Elevation: 912 ft (278 m)

Population (2020)
  - Total: 5,703
  - Density: 1,752/sq mi (676.4/km^{2})
- Time zone: UTC-6 (Central (CST))
  - Summer (DST): UTC-5 (CDT)
- Area code: 608
- FIPS code: 55-24550
- GNIS feature ID: 1564732
- Website: www.ci.evansville.wi.gov

Evansville is a city in Rock County, Wisconsin, United States. The population was 5,703 at the 2020 census. It is part of the Janesville–Beloit metropolitan statistical area.

== History ==
Evansville was first settled in the 1830s by New Englanders who were attracted to the area by its pristine wooded landscape and the placid Allen Creek. By 1855, the city recorded its first plat and was complete with homes, shops, and churches. Evansville is named for Dr. John M. Evans, a doctor and postmaster during the city's early years.

In 1863, the Chicago and North Western Railway came to Evansville, accelerating growth. At this point, Evansville's economy was based on industry and manufacturing of carriages, wagons, pumps, windmills and iron castings. The economy was also based on agriculture: dairying; farming (production of wheat and tobacco); and stock raising. By the turn of the 20th century, Evansville had over 1900 residents, and by the 1920s, most of the buildings in Evansville's future Historic District were completed.

On November 11, 1918, Armistice Day activities celebrating the end of World War I took an ugly turn as some Evansville citizens began rounding up townspeople who they had deemed insufficiently supportive of the war, mainly due to their refusal or inability to buy war bonds. A German minister and his wife were apprehended on their way out of town before being brought downtown and forced to kiss the American flag. Other "slackers" were made to wear sleighbells as they rode atop a car's radiator, while others were forced to dance in a snake formation around a bonfire. A 73-year-old woman who passed on participating in the "Your Share is Fair" war bond campaign was dragged from her home by the mob, placed in a large animal cage and paraded about the streets before being parked before the fire. The woman, Mary J. Shaw, had previously bought bonds and supported the Red Cross and other war relief efforts. After refusing to salute or kiss the flag she was rescued by other citizens. Her attempts to see her assailants punished were brushed aside by the local sheriff, and testimony before the state legislature was similarly disregarded.

In February 2024, Evansville made history as the first town in Wisconsin to experience a tornado in that month. The tornado was rated as an EF-2 and caused $7.4 million in damage to farms and other buildings in the eastern part of the city.

== Geography ==
Evansville is located at 42°46′48″N 89°18′01″W (42.779917, -89.300378). According to the United States Census Bureau, the city has a total area of 3.31 square miles (8.57 km^{2}), of which 3.25 square miles (8.42 km^{2}) is land and 0.06 square miles (0.16 km^{2}) is water. Evansville is located 23 miles (37 km) south of Madison, 20 miles (32 km) northwest of Janesville and 40 miles (64 km) northwest of Beloit.

== Demographics ==
Historical population
Census	Pop.	Note	%±
1880	1,068		—
1890	1,523		42.6%
1900	1,864		22.4%
1910	2,061		10.6%
1920	2,209		7.2%
1930	2,269		2.7%
1940	2,321		2.3%
1950	2,531		9.0%
1960	2,858		12.9%
1970	2,992		4.7%
1980	2,835		−5.2%
1990	3,174		12.0%
2000	4,039		27.3%
2010	5,012		24.1%
2020	5,703		13.8%
U.S. Decennial Census

=== 2020 census ===
As of the census of 2020, the population was 5,703. The population density was 1,752.1 inhabitants per square mile (676.5/km^{2}). There were 2,363 housing units at an average density of 726.0 per square mile (280.3/km^{2}). The racial makeup of the city was 91.0% White, 0.9% Asian, 0.9% Black or African American, 0.3% Native American, 0.1% Pacific Islander, 1.0% from other races, and 5.8% from two or more races. Ethnically, the population was 5.2% Hispanic or Latino of any race.

=== 2010 census ===
As of the census of 2010, there were 5,012 people, 1,942 households, and 1,304 families residing in the city. The population density was 1,542.2 inhabitants per square mile (595.4/km^{2}). There were 2,067 housing units at an average density of 636.0 per square mile (245.6/km^{2}). The racial makeup of the city was 96.0% White, 0.8% African American, 0.5% Native American, 0.7% Asian, 0.5% from other races, and 1.5% from two or more races. Hispanic or Latino of any race were 3.6% of the population.

There were 1,942 households, of which 40.6% had children under the age of 18 living with them, 51.0% were married couples living together, 10.9% had a female householder with no husband present, 5.3% had a male householder with no wife present, and 32.9% were non-families. 27.4% of all households were made up of individuals, and 10.3% had someone living alone who was 65 years of age or older. The average household size was 2.54 and the average family size was 3.12.

The median age in the city was 34.7 years. 29.3% of residents were under the age of 18; 6.2% were between the ages of 18 and 24; 30.5% were from 25 to 44; 22.6% were from 45 to 64; and 11.3% were 65 years of age or older. The gender makeup of the city was 48.9% male and 51.1% female.

=== 2000 census ===
As of the census of 2000, there were 4,039 people, 1,563 households, and 1,045 families residing in the city. The population density was 1,863.0 people per square mile (718.6/km^{2}). There were 1,635 housing units at an average density of 754.1 per square mile (290.9/km^{2}). The racial makeup of the city was 97.60% White, 0.12% African American, 0.42% Native American, 0.17% Asian, 0.05% Pacific Islander, 0.64% from other races, and 0.99% from two or more races. Hispanic or Latino of any race were 1.78% of the population.

There were 1,563 households, out of which 38.5% had children under the age of 18 living with them, 52.1% were married couples living together, 10.9% had a female householder with no husband present, and 33.1% were non-families. 27.7% of all households were made up of individuals, and 11.5% had someone living alone who was 65 years of age or older. The average household size was 2.51 and the average family size was 3.08.

In the city, the population was spread out, with 29.1% under the age of 18, 7.0% from 18 to 24, 33.5% from 25 to 44, 16.8% from 45 to 64, and 13.5% who were 65 years of age or older. The median age was 34 years. For every 100 females, there were 91.5 males. For every 100 females age 18 and over, there were 86.2 males.

The median income for a household in the city was $44,229, and the median income for a family was $58,451. Males had a median income of $35,614 versus $30,313 for females. The per capita income for the city was $20,766. About 2.6% of families and 4.1% of the population were below the poverty line, including 3.7% of those under age 18 and 5.6% of those age 65 or over.

== Arts and culture ==
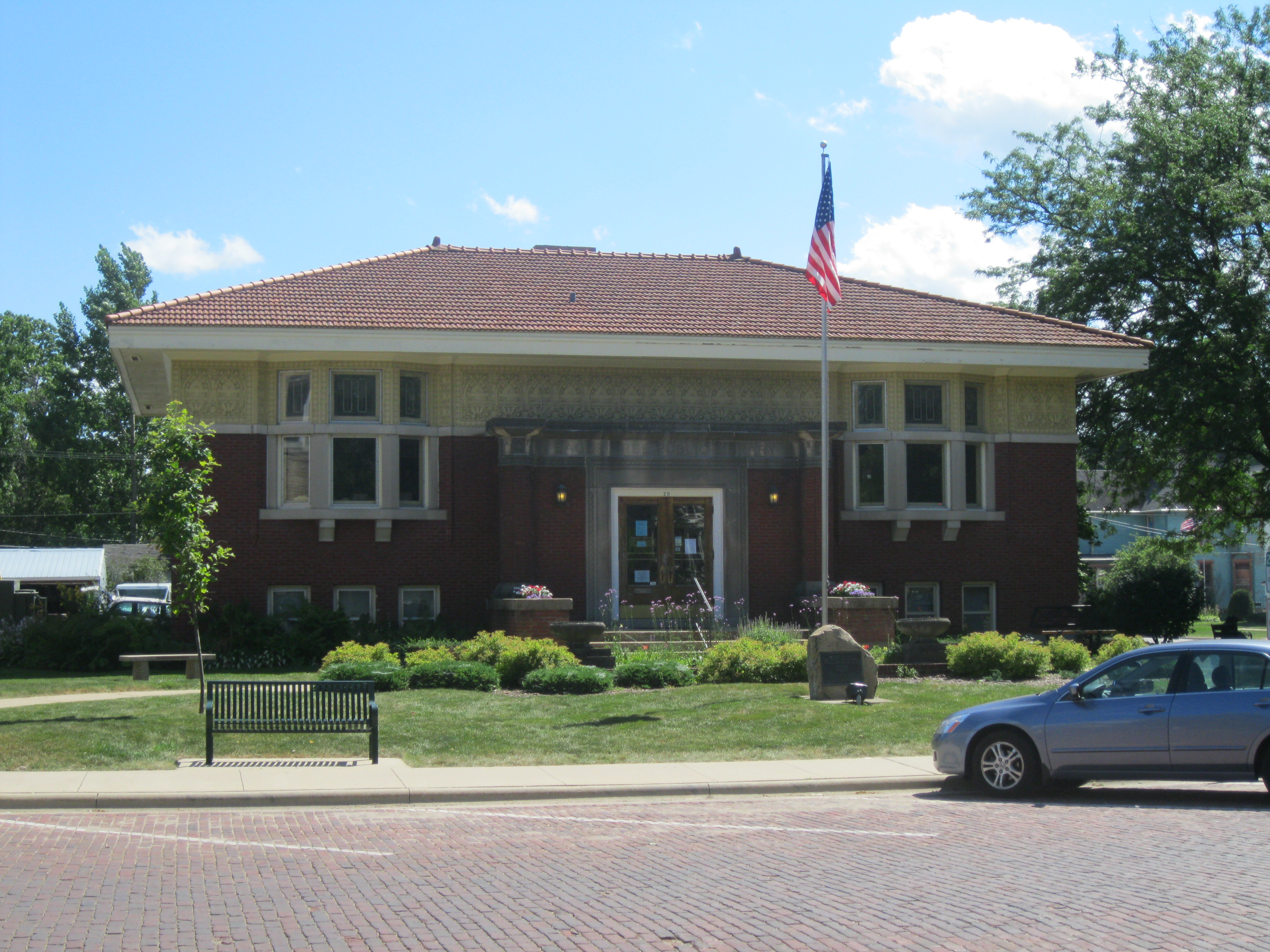
Eager Free Public Library, part of the Evansville Historic District

The Evansville Historic District, which surrounds Main Street and stretches to the side streets of Garfield Avenue and Liberty Street, includes dozens of historic homes and other structures. In 1978, the historic district was placed on the National Register of Historic Places. The Wisconsin Historical Society called Evansville home to "the finest collection of 1840s to 1915 architecture of any small town in Wisconsin."

The Eager Free Public Library building was built with the bequest of a leading citizen, Almeron Eager, in 1908. Designed by the architectural firm of Claude and Starck of Madison, Wisconsin in the Prairie style, it features stained glass windows and plaster friezes just below the overhanging roof line. A 1994 addition at the rear of the original building was designed to match the original architecture, while adding much-needed space and handicapped accessibility. The intersection on which the library stands also contains a Greek Revival home (now a funeral parlor), a High Victorian Gothic brick home (now housing the local Masonic Temple), and a classic Victorian "Painted Lady" home, still a private residence.

The Evansville Seminary was located near College Drive in the district. Its building was designed by James R. West, but now functions as apartment homes.

== Education ==
Evansville is served by the public Evansville Community School District, which includes one elementary school, one intermediate school, one middle school and Evansville High School.

== Media ==
One of the early newspapers of Evansville was the "Badger" published by Marilla Andrews & Co., established by Marilla and Eleanora Andrews in 1894 and ended in 1906. It was published every Saturday, and the subscription rate was $1.00 yearly. The 13"x 20" 8-page Republican-based newspaper had a weekly circulation of 300. Other early newspapers included "Enterprise", "Evansville Review", and "Tribune".

WWHG (105.9 FM), a mainstream rock-formatted radio station with its studios in Janesville, is licensed to Evansville. Evansville receives radio stations from the Janesville, Madison, and Rockford markets. Evansville is a part of the Madison television market; television affiliates from Rockford, Illinois are also available over the air and on cable.

== Transportation ==
In the 1860s the C&NW Railroad came to Evansville from Beloit. Later, a line was built from Evansville to Janesville, making a more direct route between Madison, Wisconsin and Chicago, Illinois. The segment between Evansville and Beloit was abandoned in the late 1970s. C&NW was acquired by Union Pacific in 1995, which abandoned much of the segment between Madison and Evansville.

== Notable people ==
- Byron Andrews, journalist, co-owner of the National Tribune, private secretary to U.S. President Ulysses S. Grant during industrial excursions to Mexico and Cuba
- Allen S. Baker, Wisconsin State Representative, soldier, and businessman
- John Baker, Wisconsin State Representative and businessman
- Merton W. Baker, U.S. Air Force Major General
- Cal Broughton, MLB player and chief of police in Evansville
- Marion Clinch Calkins, writer and educator
- Almeron Eager, Wisconsin State Representative, farmer, and businessman
- John M. Evans, physician and politician
- Kenneth O. Goehring, abstract expressionist artist
- Mariah Haberman, TV and radio host
- Kelly Hogan, singer/songwriter
- Benjamin Watson Hubbard, Wisconsin State Representative and farmer
- Burr W. Jones, lawyer, Congressman
- Ora McMurry, Distinguished Service Cross recipient
- Justus Henry Nelson, established the first Protestant church in the Amazon basin
- Martin V. Pratt, Wisconsin State Representative and businessman
- Lloyd T. Pullen, Wisconsin State Representative, farmer, businessman, and writer
- Janis Ringhand, Wisconsin state legislator and former mayor of Evansville
- Theodore Robinson, impressionist painter
- Charles Richard Van Hise, geologist and academic; president of the University of Wisconsin–Madison
- John Wilde, artist

== See also ==
- List of cities in Wisconsin
