= List of radio stations in Wisconsin =

The following is a list of FCC-licensed radio stations in the U.S. state of Wisconsin, which can be sorted by their call signs, frequencies, cities of license, licensees, and programming formats.

== List of radio stations ==
Call sign	Frequency	City of license	Format	Licensee
KDKE	102.5 FM	Superior	Classic Country	Midwest Communications, Inc.
KFIZ	1450 AM	Fond du Lac	News / Talk	RBH Enterprises, Inc.
KSPP	89.1 FM	Rhinelander	Catholic (Relevant Radio)	Northwoods Catholic Radio
KUWS	91.3 FM	Superior	WPR Music	Board of Regents, University of Wisconsin System
WACD	106.1 FM	Antigo	Country	Results Broadcasting, Inc.
WADR-LP	103.5 FM	Janesville	Variety / Community Radio	United Arts Alliance
WAPL	105.7 FM	Appleton	Classic Rock	Woodward Communications, Inc.
WAQE	1090 AM	Rice Lake	Sports (FSR)	TKC, Inc.
WAQE-FM	97.7 FM	Barron	Adult Contemporary	TKC, Inc.
WASB-LP	96.5 FM	Stanley-Boyd-Cadott	Catholic	All Saints Catholic Parish
WATK	900 AM	Antigo	Classic Hits	Results Broadcasting, Inc.
WATQ	106.7 FM	Chetek	Classic Country	iHM Licenses, LLC
WATW	1400 AM	Ashland	Classic Country	Heartland Communications License, LLC
WAUH	102.3 FM	Wautoma	Classic Hits	Hometown Broadcasting, LLC
WAUK	540 AM	Jackson	Progressive Talk	Civic Media, Inc.
WAUN	1350 AM	Portage	Classic Rock	Magnum Communications, Inc.
WAUP-LP	99.1 FM	Waupaca	Variety / Community Radio	Waupaca Area Community Radio Inc.
WAVL	100.5 FM	Rothschild	Adult Contemporary	Sunrise Broadcasting LLC
WAXX	104.5 FM	Eau Claire	Country	Clear Water Brands, Inc.
WAYY	790 AM	Eau Claire	Sports (ISN)	Clear Water Brands, Inc.
WBCR-FM	90.3 FM	Beloit	Variety	The Board of Trustees of Beloit College
WBCV	107.9 FM	Wausau	Adult Hits	NRG License Sub, LLC
WBDK	96.7 FM	Algoma	Adult Contemporary	Mazur, LLC
WBEV	1430 AM	Beaver Dam	Sports (ESPN)	Good Karma Broadcasting, LLC
WBEV-FM	95.3 FM	Beaver Dam	Full Service Oldies	Good Karma Broadcasting, LLC
WBFM	93.7 FM	Sheboygan	Country	Midwest Communications, Inc.
WBGR-FM	93.7 FM	Monroe	Oldies	Big Radio
WBIZ	1400 AM	Eau Claire	Sports (FSR)	iHM Licenses, LLC
WBIZ-FM	100.7 FM	Eau Claire	Contemporary Hit Radio	iHM Licenses, LLC
WBKY	95.9 FM	Stoughton	Country	Magnum Communications, Inc.
WBOG	1460 AM	Tomah	Classic Country	Magnum Communications, Inc. (Magnum Radio)
WBOO	102.9 FM	Reedsburg	Adult Contemporary	Magnum Communications, Inc.
WBQR-LP	104.3 FM	Brookfield	Classical	Brookfield Classical Radio, Inc.
WBSD	89.1 FM	Burlington	School Radio / Adult Album Alternative	Burlington Area School District
WBSZ	93.3 FM	Ashland	Country	Heartland Communications License, LLC
WBZH	910 AM	Hayward	Progressive Talk	Civic Media, Inc.
WCCN	1370 AM	Neillsville	Soft Adult Contemporary	Central Wisconsin Broadcasting, Inc.
WCCN-FM	107.5 FM	Neillsville	Active Rock	Central Wisconsin Broadcasting Inc.
WCFW	105.7 FM	Chippewa Falls	Adult Hits	Magnum Radio, Inc.
WCLB	950 AM	Sheboygan	Classic Country	RBH Enterprises, Inc. d/b/a Yellow Dog Broadcasting
WCLO	1230 AM	Janesville	News / Talk	Benjamin Thompson
WCLQ	89.5 FM	Wausau	Christian Contemporary	Christian Life Communications, Inc.
WCNP	89.5 FM	Baraboo	Christian / Classical	Liberty and Freedom Inc.
WCOW-FM	97.1 FM	Sparta	Country	Sparta-Tomah Broadcasting Co., Inc.
WCQM	98.3 FM	Park Falls	Country	Park Falls Community Broadcasting Corporation
WCUB	980 AM	Two Rivers	Country	Seehafer Broadcasting Corporation
WCWB	104.9 FM	Marathon	Country	Muzzy Broadcast Group, LLC
WCWI	106.1 FM	Adams	Classic Hits / Classic Country	Heart of Wisconsin Media, LLC
WCWL-LP	103.5 FM	Clearwater Lake	Religious (Radio 74)	Northern Lakes Radio, Inc.
WCYE	93.7 FM	Three Lakes	Country	Heartland Comm. License, LLC
WDDC	100.1 FM	Portage	Country	Magnum Communications, Inc.
WDDW	104.7 FM	Sturtevant	Regional Mexican	Bustos Media of Wisconsin, LLC
WDEZ	101.9 FM	Wausau	Country	Midwest Communications, Inc. (WRIG, Inc.)
WDGY	740 AM	Hudson	Classic Hits	WRPX, Inc.
WDKF	99.7 FM	Sturgeon Bay	Classic Country	Midwest Communications, Inc.
WDKV	91.7 FM	Fond du Lac	Christian Adult Contemporary (K-Love)	Educational Media Foundation
WDLB	1450 AM	Marshfield	Classic Hits	Central Wisconsin Broadcasting, Inc.
WDLS	900 AM	Wisconsin Dells	Classic Country	Magnum Communications, Inc.
WDMP-FM	99.3 FM	Dodgeville	Country	Dodge Point Broadcasting Company, Inc.
WDOR	910 AM	Sturgeon Bay	Full Service / AC	Door County Broadcasting Co., Inc.
WDOR-FM	93.9 FM	Sturgeon Bay	Full Service / AC	Door County Broadcasting Co., Inc.
WDRT	91.9 FM	Viroqua	Community Radio	Driftless Community Radio, Inc.
WDSM	710 AM	Superior	Sports (ISN)	Midwest Communications, Inc.
WDUL	970 AM	Superior	Active Rock	Midwest Communications, Inc.
WDUX-FM	92.7 FM	Waupaca	Classic Hits	Tower Road Media, Inc.
WDUZ	1400 AM	Green Bay	Sports (ISN)	Cumulus Licensing LLC
WDUZ-FM	107.5 FM	Brillion	Sports (ISN)	Cumulus Licensing LLC
WDVM	1050 AM	Eau Claire	Catholic (Relevant Radio)	Relevant Radio, Inc.
WDYD-LP	100.9 FM	Merrill	Religious	The New Testament Church, Inc.
WEAQ	1150 AM	Chippewa Falls	Classic country/Farm news	Clear Water Brands, Inc.
WECL	92.9 FM	Lake Hallie	Active Rock	Clear Water Brands, Inc.
WEGZ	105.9 FM	Washburn	Conservative Christian (VCY America)	Keweenaw Bay Broadcasting, Inc.
WEKZ	1260 AM	Monroe	Classic Country	Big Radio
WEMI	91.9 FM	Appleton	Christian Adult Contemporary	Evangel Ministries, Inc.
WEMY	91.5 FM	Green Bay	Christian Adult Contemporary	Evangel Ministries, Inc.
WEQL	104.9 FM	La Crosse	Contemporary Christian	The Salvation Poem Foundation
WEQS	89.3 FM	Sparta	Christian Contemporary	The Salvation Poem Foundation, Inc.
WERL	950 AM	Eagle River	Conservative Talk	Heartland Communications License, LLC
WERN	88.7 FM	Madison	WPR News	State of Wisconsin – Educational Communications Board
WEVR	1550 AM	River Falls	Soft Adult Contemporary	Hanten Broadcasting Company, Inc.
WEVR-FM	106.3 FM	River Falls	Soft Adult Contemporary	Hanten Broadcasting Company, Inc.
WEZY	92.7 FM	Kewaunee	Regional Mexican	Magnum Communications, Inc.
WFAQ-LP	101.3 FM	Mukwonago	Variety	Kettle Moraine Community Radio, Inc.
WFAW	940 AM	Fort Atkinson	Classic Rock	Magnum Communications, Inc.
WFBZ	105.5 FM	Trempealeau	Sports (ESPN)	Sparta-Tomah Broadcasting Co., Inc.
WFDL	1170 AM	Waupun	Oldies	Radio Plus, Inc.
WFDL-FM	97.7 FM	Lomira	Adult Contemporary	Radio Plus, Inc.
WFHR	1320 AM	Wisconsin Rapids	Progressive Talk	Civic Media, Inc.
WFON	107.1 FM	Fond du Lac	Country	RBH Enterprises, Inc.
WFZZ	104.3 FM	Seymour	Alternative Rock	Woodward Communications, Inc.
WGBT	91.3 FM	Tomahawk	Religious (Radio 74)	Radio 74 Internationale
WGBW	1590 AM	Denmark	Progressive Talk	Civic Media, Inc.
WGEE	93.5 FM	New London	Classic Country	Midwest Communications, Inc.
WGEZ	1490 AM	Beloit	Classic Country	Big Radio
WGHF-LP	93.7 FM	Superior	Religious (3ABN)	Superior Seventh-Day Adventist Church
WGKB	1510 AM	Waukesha	Black Talk Radio	Good Karma Broadcasting, LLC
WGLB	1560 AM	Elm Grove	Gospel	JJK Media, LLC
WGLR-FM	97.7 FM	Lancaster	Country	QueenB Radio Wisconsin, Inc.
WGLX-FM	103.3 FM	Wisconsin Rapids	Classic Rock	NRG License Sub, LLC
WGMO	95.3 FM	Spooner	Classic Rock	Zoe Communications, Inc.
WGNV	88.5 FM	Milladore	Christian Adult Contemporary	Evangel Ministries, Inc.
WGNW	99.9 FM	Cornell	Contemporary Christian	The Family Radio Network, Inc.
WGTD	91.1 FM	Kenosha	WPR News	Gateway Technical College
WGXI	1420 AM	Plymouth	Classic Country	Galaxie Broadcasting, LLC
WHA	970 AM	Madison	WPR News	Board of Regents of University of Wisconsin System
WHAA	89.1 FM	Adams	WPR Music	State of Wisconsin – Educational Communications Board
WHAD	90.7 FM	Delafield	WPR Music	State of Wisconsin – Educational Communications Board
WHBL	1330 AM	Sheboygan	Conservative Talk	Midwest Communications, Inc.
WHBM	90.3 FM	Park Falls	WPR News	State of Wisconsin – Educational Communications Board
WHBY	1150 AM	Kimberly	News / Talk	Woodward Communications, Inc.
WHBZ	106.5 FM	Sheboygan Falls	Mainstream Rock	Midwest Communications, Inc.
WHDG	97.3 FM	Rhinelander	Country	NRG Media (Raven License Sub, LLC)
WHDI	91.9 FM	Sister Bay	WPR Music	State of Wisconsin – Educational Communications Board
WHEM	91.3 FM	Eau Claire	Christian	Fourth Dimension, Inc.
WHFA	1240 AM	Poynette	Catholic (Relevant Radio)	Relevant Radio, Inc.
WHHI	91.3 FM	Highland	WPR Music	State of Wisconsin – Educational Communications Board
WHID	88.1 FM	Green Bay	WPR Music	Board of Regents, University of Wisconsin System
WHIT	1550 AM	Madison	Classic Country	Mid-West Management, Inc.
WHJL	88.1 FM	Merrill	Christian	WRVM, Inc.
WHLA	90.3 FM	La Crosse	WPR News	State of Wisconsin – Educational Communications Board
WHND	89.7 FM	Sister Bay	WPR News	State of Wisconsin – Educational Communications Board
WHQG	102.9 FM	Milwaukee	Mainstream Rock	Saga Communications (Lakefront Communications, LLC)
WHRC-LP	97.3 FM	Chippewa Falls	Christian	Chippewa Falls Christian Radio, Inc.
WHRM	90.9 FM	Wausau	WPR News	State of Wisconsin – Educational Communications Board
WHRY	1450 AM	Hurley	Oldies	Baroka Broadcasting, Inc.
WHSA	89.9 FM	Brule	WPR News	State of Wisconsin – Educational Communications Board
WHSF	89.9 FM	Rhinelander	WPR Music	State of Wisconsin – Educational Communications Board
WHSM-FM	101.1 FM	Hayward	Country	Zoe Communications, Inc.
WHTL-FM	102.3 FM	Whitehall	Classic Hits	WHTL Group, LLC
WHTQ	96.7 FM	Whiting	Contemporary Hit Radio	NRG License Sub, LLC
WHWA	104.7 FM	Washburn	WPR Music	State of Wisconsin – Educational Communications Board
WHWC	88.3 FM	Menomonie	WPR News	State of Wisconsin – Educational Communications Board
WHYS-LP	96.3 FM	Eau Claire	Community Radio	Northern Thunder, Inc.
WIAL	94.1 FM	Elk Mound	Hot Adult Contemporary	Clear Water Brands, Inc.
WIBA	1310 AM	Madison	News / Talk	iHM Licenses, LLC
WIBA-FM	101.5 FM	Sauk City	Classic Rock	iHM Licenses, LLC
WIDE-LP	99.1 FM	Madison	Variety	Madison Mainstream Radio, Inc.
WIEC-LP	102.7 FM	Eau Claire	Blues / Reggae / Eclectic	The Eau Claire Broadcasting Association
WIFC	95.5 FM	Wausau	Contemporary Hit Radio / Modern adult contemporary	Midwest Communications, Inc. (WRIG, Inc.)
WIGM	1490 AM	Medford	Country	WIGM, Inc.
WIIL	95.1 FM	Kenosha	Active Rock	Alpha Media Licensee LLC
WILW-LP	96.3 FM	Waupaca	Community Radio	City of Waupaca
WIRI	105.5 FM	Nekoosa	Classic Country	Civic Media, Inc.
WISM-FM	98.1 FM	Altoona	Classic Hits	Clear Water Brands, Inc.
WISN	1130 AM	Milwaukee	News / Talk	iHM Licenses, LLC
WISS	1100 AM	Berlin	Progressive Talk	Civic Media, Inc.
WISY-LP	92.5 FM	Black Earth	Community Radio	Mazomanie Music Conservancy Limited
WIWI-LP	99.7 FM	Milwaukee	Community Radio	Milwaukee Hispanic Radio, Inc.
WIXK	1590 AM	New Richmond	Hmong	Hmong Radio Broadcast, LLC
WIXL-LP	97.1 FM	Madison	Christian Rock	Lake City Church, Inc.
WIXX	101.1 FM	Green Bay	Contemporary Hit Radio	Midwest Communications, Inc.
WIZM	1410 AM	La Crosse	News / Talk	Family Radio, Inc.
WIZM-FM	93.3 FM	La Crosse	Contemporary Hit Radio	Family Radio, Inc.
WJBL	93.1 FM	Ladysmith	Classic Hits	Zoe Communications Inc
WJJH	96.7 FM	Ashland	Classic Rock	Heartland Communications License, LLC
WJJO	94.1 FM	Watertown	Active Rock	Mid-West Management, Inc.
WJJQ	810 AM	Tomahawk	Sports (ISN)	Albert Broadcasting II, LLC
WJJQ-FM	92.5 FM	Tomahawk	Adult Contemporary	Albert Broadcasting II, LLC
WJLM-LP	96.9 FM	Altoona	Christian	Otter Creek Christian Radio, Inc.
WJMC	1240 AM	Rice Lake	Full Service	TKC, Inc.
WJMC-FM	96.1 FM	Rice Lake	Country	TKC, Inc.
WJMQ	92.3 FM	Clintonville	Country	Results Broadcasting, Inc.
WJMR-FM	98.3 FM	Menomonee Falls	Urban Adult Contemporary	Saga Communications (Lakefront Communications, LLC)
WJMT	730 AM	Merrill	Oldies	Sunrise Broadcasting LLC
WJOI	1340 AM	Milwaukee	Christian Contemporary	Saga Communications (Lakefront Communications, LLC)
WJOK	1050 AM	Kaukauna	Catholic (Relevant Radio)	Relevant Radio, Inc.
WJQM	93.1 FM	De Forest	Rhythmic Contemporary	Mid-West Management, Inc.
WJTI	1460 AM	West Allis	Smooth Jazz	El Sol Broadcasting, LLC
WJTY	88.1 FM	Lancaster	Christian Contemporary	Family Life Broadcasting, Inc.
WJVL	99.9 FM	Janesville	Country	Benjamin Thompson
WJWD	90.3 FM	Marshall	Christian	Calvary Radio Network
WKBH	1570 AM	Holmen	Catholic (Relevant Radio)	Relevant Radio, Inc.
WKBH-FM	102.7 FM	Onalaska	Classic Rock	Magnum Communications, Inc.
WKCH	106.5 FM	Whitewater	Classic Country	Magnum Communications, Inc.
WKEB	99.3 FM	Medford	Adult Hits	WIGM, Inc.
WKFX	99.1 FM	Rice Lake	Classic Hits	TKC, Inc.
WKJJ-LP	101.3 FM	Milwaukee	Community Radio	Inner City Development Project, Inc
WKKV-FM	100.7 FM	Racine	Urban Contemporary	iHM Licenses, LLC
WKLH	96.5 FM	Milwaukee	Classic Rock	Saga Communications (Lakefront Communications, LLC)
WKLJ	1290 AM	Sparta	Sports (ESPN)	Sparta-Tomah Broadcasting Co., Inc.
WKPO	105.9 FM	Soldiers Grove	Adult Hits	Robinson Corporation
WKRU	106.7 FM	Allouez	Classic Rock	Cumulus Licensing LLC
WKSZ	95.9 FM	De Pere	Contemporary Hit Radio	Woodward Communications Inc
WKTI	94.5 FM	Milwaukee	Sports (ESPN)	Good Karma Broadcasting, L.L.C.
WKTY	580 AM	La Crosse	Sports (CBS)	Family Radio, Inc.
WKZY	92.9 FM	Chilton	Contemporary Hit Radio	Woodward Communications, Inc.
WLAK	1260 AM	Amery	Progressive Talk	Civic Media, Inc.
WLBI-LP	107.1 FM	Tomahawk	Religious (Radio 74)	Above and Beyond Broadcasting, Inc.
WLBL	930 AM	Auburndale	WPR Music	State of Wisconsin – Educational Communications Board
WLBL-FM	91.9 FM	Wausau	WPR Music	State of Wisconsin – Educational Communications Board
WLCB-LP	101.5 FM	Burlington	Community Radio	Lakes Community Broadcasting
WLCJ-LP	92.5 FM	Marinette	Catholic (Relevant Radio)	Venite Adoremus
WLCW	100.1 FM	West Salem	Christian Adult Contemporary (K-Love)	Educational Media Foundation
WLCX	1490 AM	La Crosse	Progressive talk	Civic Media, Inc.
WLDB	105.3 FM	Mukwonago	Christian Adult Contemporary (K-Love)	Educational Media Foundation
WLDY	1340 AM	Ladysmith	Classic Country	Zoe Communications Inc
WLGE	106.9 FM	Baileys Harbor	Adult Album Alternative	Case Communications, LLC
WLIP	1050 AM	Kenosha	Talk / Full service	Alpha Media Licensee LLC
WLKD	1570 AM	Minocqua	Soft Oldies	NRG Media (Raven License Sub, LLC)
WLKG	96.1 FM	Lake Geneva	Hot Adult Contemporary	CTJ Communications, Ltd.
WLKN	98.1 FM	Cleveland	Adult Contemporary	Seehafer Broadcasting Corporation
WLMV	1480 AM	Madison	Spanish Music	Mid-West Management, Inc.
WLSP-LP	103.5 FM	Sun Prairie	Variety	Sun Prairie Community Foundation
WLST	95.1 FM	Marinette	Country	Radio Plus Bay Cities, LLC
WLSU	88.9 FM	La Crosse	WPR Music	Board of Regents, University of Wisconsin System
WLTU	92.1 FM	Manitowoc	Country	Seehafer Broadcasting Corporation
WLUM-FM	102.1 FM	Milwaukee	Worship music (Air1)	Educational Media Foundation
WLVE	93.3 FM	Milwaukee	Christian Adult Contemporary (K-Love)	Educational Media Foundation
WLWR-LP	107.7 FM	Marinette	Variety	Marinette Radio Association
WLXR	96.1 FM	Tomah	Hot Adult Contemporary	Magnum Radio, Inc.
WMAD	96.3 FM	Sauk City	Country	iHM Licenses, LLC
WMAM	570 AM	Marinette	Sports (ESPN)	Radio Plus Bay Cities, LLC
WMBZ	92.5 FM	West Bend	Country	Magnum Communications, Inc.
WMDC	98.7 FM	Mayville	Classic Hits	Radio Plus, Inc.
WMDX	1580 AM	Columbus	Progressive Talk	Civic Media, Inc.
WMEQ	880 AM	Menomonie	News / Talk	iHM Licenses, LLC
WMEQ-FM	92.1 FM	Menomonie	Classic Rock	iHM Licenses, LLC
WMGN	98.1 FM	Madison	Adult Contemporary	Mid-West Management, Inc.
WMHX	105.1 FM	Waunakee	Hot Adult Contemporary	Audacy License, LLC.
WMIL-FM	106.1 FM	Waukesha	Country	iHM Licenses, LLC
WMMA-FM	93.9 FM	Nekoosa	Catholic (Relevant Radio)	Relevant Radio, Inc.
WMMM-FM	105.5 FM	Verona	Adult Album Alternative	Audacy License, LLC
WMNM-LP	105.1 FM	Mount Morris	Variety	Mt. Morris / Waushara Preservation Group, Inc.
WMQA-FM	95.9 FM	Minocqua	Adult Contemporary	NRG Media (Raven License Sub, LLC)
WMSE	91.7 FM	Milwaukee	Eclectic	Milwaukee School of Engineering
WMUU-LP	102.9 FM	Madison	Religious Talk	Cow Power Media Productions Co.
WMVM	90.7 FM	Goodman	Christian	WRVM, Inc.
WMWG-LP	89.3 FM	Glendale	Variety	Milwaukee Turners Inc.
WMWK	88.1 FM	Milwaukee	Christian (Family Radio)	Family Stations, Inc.
WMYX-FM	99.1 FM	Milwaukee	Hot Adult Contemporary	Audacy License, LLC
WNAM	1280 AM	Neenah-Menasha	Silent	Cumulus Licensing LLC
WNCY-FM	100.3 FM	Neenah-Menasha	Country	Midwest Communications, Inc.
WNFL	1440 AM	Green Bay	Sports (FSR)	Midwest Communications, Inc.
WNFM	104.9 FM	Reedsburg	Country	Magnum Communications, Inc.
WNNO-FM	106.9 FM	Wisconsin Dells	Hot Adult Contemporary	Magnum Communications, Inc.
WNOV	860 AM	Milwaukee	Urban Contemporary	Courier Communications Corp.
WNRB-LP	93.3 FM	Wausau	Community Radio	Wausau Area Hmong Mutual Association
WNWC	1190 AM	Sun Prairie	Christian	University of Northwestern – St. Paul
WNWC-FM	102.5 FM	Madison	Christian Contemporary	University of Northwestern – St. Paul
WNWX	96.5 FM	Rhinelander	Hot Adult Contemporary	Heartland Comm. License, LLC
WNXR	107.3 FM	Iron River	Classic Hits	Heartland Comm. License, LLC
WOBT	1240 AM	Rhinelander	Sports (FSR)	NRG License Sub, LLC
WOCO	1260 AM	Oconto	Country	Lamardo Inc.
WOCO-FM	107.1 FM	Oconto	Easy Listening	Lamardo Inc.
WOCT-LP	101.9 FM	Oshkosh	Variety / Community Radio	Friends of OCOM
WOGB	103.1 FM	Reedsville	Classic Hits	Cumulus Licensing LLC
WOGO	680 AM	Hallie	News / Talk	Stewards of Sound, Inc.
WOJB	88.9 FM	Reserve	Community Radio	Lac Courte Oreilles Ojibwa Public Broadcasting Corporation
WOKY	920 AM	Milwaukee	Sports (FSR)	iHM Licenses, LLC
WOLX-FM	94.9 FM	Baraboo	Classic Hits	Audacy License, LLC
WOMT	1240 AM	Manitowoc	Full Service / AC	Seehafer Broadcasting Corporation
WOMT-FM	98.9 FM	Two Rivers	Full Service / AC	Seehafer Broadcasting Corporation
WORQ	90.1 FM	Green Bay	Christian Contemporary	Lakeshore Communications, Inc.
WORT	89.9 FM	Madison	Community Radio	Back Porch Radio Broadcasting, Inc.
WOSH	1490 AM	Oshkosh	News / Talk	Cumulus Licensing LLC
WOSQ	92.3 FM	Spencer	Sports (ESPN)	Central Wisconsin Broadcasting, Inc.
WOTE	1380 AM	Clintonville	Sports (ESPN)	Results Broadcasting, Inc.
WOVM	91.1 FM	Appleton	Adult Album Alternative	Music That Matters, Inc.
WOWN	99.3 FM	Shawano	Classic Hits	Results Broadcasting Inc.
WOZN	1670 AM	Madison	Sports (ISN)	Mid-West Management, Inc.
WOZZ	94.7 FM	Mosinee	Mainstream Rock	WRIG, Inc.
WPAK-FM	106.9 FM	Tigerton		Multi-Cultural Diversity Radio, Inc.
WPCA	800 AM	Waupaca	Mainstream Rock	Tower Road Media, Inc.
WPCA-LP	93.1 FM	Amery	Full Service / Jazz	Dream Center, Inc.
WPCK	104.9 FM	Denmark	Christian Adult Contemporary (K-Love)	Educational Media Foundation
WPCN	1010 AM	Stevens Point	Oldies	Muzzy Broadcast Group, LLC
WPFF	90.5 FM	Sturgeon Bay	Christian Adult Contemporary (K-Love)	Educational Media Foundation
WPFP	980 AM	Park Falls	Adult Hits	Park Falls Community Broadcasting Corporation
WPGR-LP	105.7 FM	Clear Lake	Religious (LifeTalk Radio)	Clear Lake Christian Radio, Inc.
WPHF-LP	105.3 FM	Menomonie	Religious (3ABN)	Menomonie Christian Radio, Inc.
WPJQ-LP	101.3 FM	Milwaukee	Community Radio	Faith Community Development Corporation
WPKG	92.7 FM	Neillsville	Hot Adult Contemporary	Central Wisconsin Broadcasting, Inc.
WPKR	99.5 FM	Omro	Country	Cumulus Licensing LLC
WPLT	106.3 FM	Sarona	Country	Zoe Communications, Inc.
WPNE	89.3 FM	Green Bay	WPR News	State of Wisconsin – Educational Communications Board
WPPS-LP	92.9 FM	Oconto Falls	Catholic (Relevant Radio)	St. Padre Pio Radio, Inc.
WPRE	980 AM	Prairie du Chien	Classic Hits	Robinson Corporation
WPSA-LP	93.5 FM	Portage	Religious (Radio 74)	Portage Educational Broadcasting Inc
WPTT	1540 AM	Hartford	Oldies	Tomsun Media, LLC
WPVL	1590 AM	Platteville	Sports (ESPN)	QueenB Radio Wisconsin, Inc.
WPVL-FM	107.1 FM	Platteville	Contemporary Hit Radio	QueenB Radio Wisconsin, Inc.
WPVM	88.5 FM	Sturgeon Bay	Christian	WRVM, Inc.
WQCC	106.3 FM	La Crosse	Country	Magnum Communications, Inc.
WQDC	97.7 FM	Sturgeon Bay	Classic Hits	Case Communications LLC
WQLH	98.5 FM	Green Bay	Hot Adult Contemporary	Cumulus Licensing LLC
WQMN	88.7 FM	Minocqua	Religious (Radio 74)	Radio 74 Internationale
WQPC	94.3 FM	Prairie du Chien	Country	Robinson Corporation
WQQA	91.7 FM	Forestville	Religious (Radio 74)	Radio 74 Internationale
WQRB	95.1 FM	Bloomer	Country	iHM Licenses, LLC
WQTC-FM	102.3 FM	Manitowoc	Classic Rock	Seehafer Broadcasting Corporation
WQWA-LP	88.1 FM	Columbus	Religious (Radio 74)	Wisconsin Academy
WRAO	91.7 FM	Wisconsin Rapids	Religious (3ABN)	Wisconsin Rapids Seventh-Day Adventist Church
WRBP-LP	92.5 FM	Wisconsin Rapids	Religious	Calvary Chapel of Wisconsin Rapids, Inc.
WRCE	1450 AM	Richland Center	Full Service Oldies	Civic Media, Inc.
WRCO-FM	100.9 FM	Richland Center	Country	Civic Media, Inc.
WRDB	1400 AM	Reedsburg	Oldies/Sports (ESPN)	Magnum Communications, Inc.
WRDN	1430 AM	Durand	Country	Durand Broadcasting
WRFP-LP	101.9 FM	Eau Claire	Indie Rock	Eau Claire Public Access Center, Inc.
WRFW	88.7 FM	River Falls	WPR News	Board of Regents, University of Wisconsin System
WRGW-LP	94.5 FM	Shawano	Catholic (Relevant Radio)	Sacred Heart Educational Association
WRHN	100.1 FM	Rhinelander	Adult Hits	NRG License Sub, LLC
WRIG	1390 AM	Schofield	Sports (FSR)	WRIG, Inc.
WRIS-FM	106.7 FM	Mount Horeb	Alternative Rock	Mid-West Management, Inc.
WRIT-FM	95.7 FM	Milwaukee	Classic Hits	iHM Licenses, LLC
WRJC	1270 AM	Mauston	Country	Murphy's Law Media Group, LLC
WRJC-FM	92.1 FM	Mauston	Hot Adult Contemporary	Murphy's Law Media Group, LLC
WRJF-LP	101.7 FM	Menomonie	Christian Contemporary	Calvary Chapel (Church) of Menomonie
WRJM	1290 AM	Greenfield	Full Service Oldies	Milwaukee Radio Alliance, LLC
WRJN	1400 AM	Racine	Full Service Oldies	Magnum Communications, Inc.
WRJO	94.5 FM	Eagle River	Classic Hits	Heartland Communications License, LLC
WRKU	102.1 FM	Forestville	Hot Adult Contemporary	Mazur, LLC
WRLO-FM	105.3 FM	Antigo	Classic Rock	NRG License Sub, LLC
WRLS-FM	92.3 FM	Hayward	Adult Contemporary	Vacationland Broadcasting, Inc.
WRLU	104.1 FM	Algoma	Classic Country	Mazur, LLC
WRMW	91.3 FM	Peshtigo	Religious	Radio Maria, Inc.
WRNW	97.3 FM	Milwaukee	Sports (FSR)	iHM Licenses, LLC
WRPN	1600 AM	Ripon	Full Service / Soft Oldies/AC	Hometown Broadcasting, LLC
WRPQ	740 AM	Baraboo	Adult Hits	Civic Media, Inc.
WRQT	95.7 FM	La Crosse	Active Rock	Family Radio, Inc.
WRST-FM	90.3 FM	Oshkosh	WPR News	Board of Regents, University of Wisconsin System
WRVM	102.7 FM	Suring	Christian	WRVM, Inc.
WRXS	106.9 FM	Brookfield	Oldies	Lakefront Communications, LLC
WRYU	1470 AM	West Bend	Classic Rock	Magnum Communications, Inc.
WSAU	550 AM	Wausau	News / Talk	WRIG, Inc.
WSAU-FM	99.9 FM	Rudolph	News / Talk	WRIG, Inc.
WSBW	105.1 FM	Ephraim	Adult Hits	Mazur, LLC
WSCM	95.7 FM	Baldwin	Classic country	Civic Media, Inc.
WSCO	1570 AM	Appleton	Sports (SM)	Woodward Communications, Inc.
WSFQ	96.3 FM	Peshtigo	Classic Rock	Radio Plus Bay Cities, LLC
WSHS	91.7 FM	Sheboygan	School Radio / WPR Music	Sheboygan Area School District
WSJP	1640 AM	Sussex	Catholic (Relevant Radio)	Relevant Radio, Inc.
WSJP-FM	100.1 FM	Port Washington	Catholic (Relevant Radio)	Relevant Radio, Inc.
WSJY	107.3 FM	Fort Atkinson	Adult Contemporary	Magnum Communications, Inc.
WSLD	104.5 FM	Whitewater	Country	CMC Media LLC
WSNP-LP	105.9 FM	Stevens Point	Community Radio	City of Stevens Point
WSPT	97.9 FM	Stevens Point	Classic Hits	Muzzy Broadcast Group, LLC
WSSP	1250 AM	Milwaukee	Sports (ISN/BetQL)	Audacy License, LLC
WSSU	88.5 FM	Superior	WPR News	State of Wisconsin – Educational Communications Board
WSSW	89.1 FM	Platteville	WPR News	State of Wisconsin – Educational Communications Board
WSTM	91.3 FM	Kiel	Christian Adult Contemporary	Evangel Ministries, Inc.
WSUM	91.7 FM	Madison	College Radio	Board of Regents, University of Wisconsin System
WSUP	90.5 FM	Platteville	College Radio	Board of Regents, University of Wisconsin System
WSUW	91.7 FM	Whitewater	Alternative	Board of Regents, University of Wisconsin System
WSWJ-LP	104.7 FM	Hager City	Christian (3ABN)	Red Wing Broadcasting Association
WTAQ	1360 AM	Green Bay	News / Talk	Midwest Communications, Inc.
WTAQ-FM	97.5 FM	Glenmore	News / Talk	Midwest Communications, Inc.
WTCH	960 AM	Shawano	Classic Country	Results Broadcasting Inc.
WTCX	96.1 FM	Ripon	Mainstream Rock	Radio Plus, Inc.
WTKM-FM	104.9 FM	Hartford	Full Service / Polka	Tomsun Media, LLC
WTLX	100.5 FM	Middleton	Sports (ESPN)	Good Karma Broadcasting, LLC
WTMB	94.5 FM	Tomah	Classic Rock	Magnum Radio, Inc.
WTMJ	620 AM	Milwaukee	News / Talk	Good Karma Broadcasting, L.L.C.
WTPN	103.9 FM	Westby	Christian Contemporary	The Salvation Poem Foundation, Inc.
WTSO	1070 AM	Madison	Sports (FSR)	iHM Licenses, LLC
WTSW-LP	96.3 FM	Manitowoc	Religious	Calvary Chapel of Manitowoc, Inc.
WUEC	89.7 FM	Eau Claire	WPR Music	Board of Regents, University of Wisconsin System
WULD-LP	96.9 FM	Waterloo	Christian	Waterloo Christian Radio Corporation
WUWM	89.7 FM	Milwaukee	Public Radio (NPR)	Board of Regents, University of Wisconsin System
WUWS	90.9 FM	Ashland	WPR News	Board of Regents of the University of Wisconsin System
WVBO	103.9 FM	Winneconne	Classic Hits	Cumulus Licensing LLC
WVCF	90.5 FM	Eau Claire	Conservative Christian (VCY America)	VCY America, Inc.
WVCS	90.1 FM	Owen	Conservative Christian (VCY America)	VCY America, Inc.
WVCX	98.9 FM	Tomah	Conservative Christian (VCY America)	VCY America, Inc.
WVCY	690 AM	Oshkosh	Conservative Christian (VCY America)	VCY America, Inc.
WVCY-FM	107.7 FM	Milwaukee	Conservative Christian (VCY America)	VCY America, Inc.
WVFL	89.9 FM	Fond du Lac	Conservative Christian (VCY America)	VCY America, Inc.
WVMO-LP	98.7 FM	Monona	Community Radio	City of Monona
WVRE	101.1 FM	Dickeyville	Country	Radio Dubuque, Inc.
WVRN	88.9 FM	Wittenberg	Conservative Christian (VCY America)	VCY America, Inc.
WVRQ	1360 AM	Viroqua	Oldies	Robinson Corporation
WVRQ-FM	102.3 FM	Viroqua	Country	Robinson Corporation
WVSS	90.7 FM	Menomonie	WPR Music	Board of Regents, University of Wisconsin System
WVTY	92.1 FM	Racine	Country	Magnum Communications, Inc.
WWEN	88.1 FM	Wentworth	Catholic	Real Presence Radio
WWHG	105.9 FM	Evansville	Mainstream Rock	Big Radio
WWIB	103.7 FM	Hallie	Christian Contemporary	Stewards of Sound, Inc.
WWIS	1260 AM	Black River Falls	Full Service / AC	WWIS Radio, Inc.
WWIS-FM	99.7 FM	Black River Falls	Classic Country	WWIS Radio, Inc.
WWJC	101.5 FM	Augusta	Christian Contemporary	The Salvation Poem Foundation, Inc.
WWJP-LP	101.7 FM	Rice Lake	Religious (3ABN)	Meadow Creek Christian Radio Corporation
WWMD-LP	95.3 FM	Ashland	Catholic (Relevant Radio)	Holy Family Radio Association
WWMV-LP	95.5 FM	Madison	Hip Hop	Lussier Community Education Center Inc
WWQM-FM	106.3 FM	Middleton	Country	Mid-West Management, Inc.
WWSP	89.9 FM	Stevens Point	Alternative	Board of Regents, University of Wisconsin System
WWWX	96.9 FM	Oshkosh	Alternative Rock	Cumulus Licensing LLC
WXCO	1230 AM	Wausau	Progressive Talk	Civic Media, Inc.
WXCX	105.7 FM	Siren	Classic Country	Zoe Communications, Inc.
WXER	104.5 FM	Plymouth	Hot Adult Contemporary	Midwest Communications, Inc.
WXNK	940 AM	Shell Lake	Active Rock	Zoe Communications, Inc.
WXPR	91.7 FM	Rhinelander	Public Radio (NPR)	White Pine Community Broadcasting, Inc.
WXPW	91.9 FM	Wausau	Public Radio (NPR)	White Pine Community Broadcasting, Inc.
WXRW-LP	104.1 FM	Milwaukee	Community Radio	Riverwest Artists Association, Inc.
WXSS	103.7 FM	Wauwatosa	Contemporary Hit Radio	Audacy License, LLC
WXVM	104.1 FM	Merrill	Christian	WRVM, Inc.
WXXM	92.1 FM	Sun Prairie	Classic Hits	iHM Licenses, LLC
WYDR	94.3 FM	Neenah-Menasha	Adult Hits	Midwest Communications, Inc.
WYMS	88.9 FM	Milwaukee	Adult Album Alternative	Milwaukee Board of School Directors
WYNW	92.9 FM	Birnamwood	Catholic (Relevant Radio)	Relevant Radio, Inc.
WYRL-LP	105.5 FM	Rice Lake		Law Enforcement Foundation of Barron County
WYTE	106.5 FM	Marshfield	Country	NRG License Sub, LLC
WYVM	90.9 FM	Sheboygan	Christian	WRVM, Inc.
WZBU	1520 AM	New Holstein	Progressive Talk	Civic Media, Inc.
WZEE	104.1 FM	Madison	Contemporary Hit Radio	iHM Licenses, LLC
WZEZ	104.9 FM	Balsam Lake	Classic Hits	Zoe Communications, Inc.
WZOR	94.7 FM	Mishicot	Active Rock	Woodward Communications, Inc.
WZOS	104.7 FM	Berlin	Active Rock	Woodward Communications, Inc.
WZRK	810 AM	Dodgeville	Active Rock	Dodge Point Broadcasting Company, Inc.

== Defunct ==
- WAWA
- WCCX
- WDLB-FM
- WEBC-FM
- WFMR
- WGBP-FM
- WGLR
- WOKW
- WRNC-LP
- WRZC-LP
- WXXD-LP
- WZRK
