= Packers Radio Network =

Official radio network of the NFL's Green Bay Packers

Green Bay Packers Radio Network
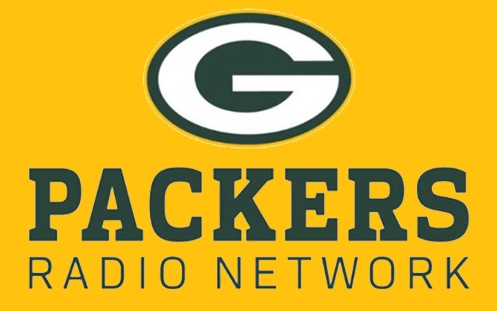
- Type: Radio network
- Country: United States
- Headquarters: Green Bay, Wisconsin
- Broadcast area: Wisconsin; Michigan; Minnesota; Illinois (limited); South Dakota (limited); North Dakota (limited)
- Owner: Green Bay Packers
- Affiliation: NFL
- Affiliates: 50
- Official website: Packers Radio Network

The Packers Radio Network is a broadcast radio network and the official radio broadcaster of the Green Bay Packers of the National Football League (NFL), fully under the team's control in regards to technical productions and on-air personnel. The network's flagship is iHeartMedia's WRIT-FM (95.7 FM) in Milwaukee, Wisconsin, and its coverage is also heard nationwide through NFL Game Pass, SiriusXM, and TuneIn.

The team's play-by-play announcer is Wayne Larrivee, with former Packer center Larry McCarren providing color commentary since 1995. Former Packers fullback John Kuhn serves as the network's sideline reporter.

== History ==
The Packers radio network was previously with WTMJ, which has broadcast the games since November 24, 1929, and was the former flagship station of Journal Communications until the E. W. Scripps Company and Journal completed their broadcast merger and publishing spin-off on April 1, 2015 (Good Karma took over WTMJ's operations on November 1, 2018 upon Scripps' second withdrawal from radio). It was one of the few arrangements where a team's flagship radio station was not based in their home market and the local station served as a network affiliate only; WTMJ can be heard at city-grade strength in most of eastern Wisconsin, including Green Bay. Meanwhile, the rights for Packers games in the Green Bay are held by Midwest Communications's WIXX, with Midwest Communications acquiring the Fox Cities rights to the team in 2022 for WYDR, resolving an oddity in the network where former Fox Cities affiliate WAPL transmits from the same tower site as WIXX.

In situations where Milwaukee Brewers baseball playoff games conflicted with Packers games (WTMJ and Good Karma Brands originate that team's broadcasts as the Brewers Radio Network) in September and October, WTMJ's FM sister station WKTI (94.5) originated the games in Milwaukee, with other stations in the Packers Radio Network continuing to determine how to carry both games, depending on whether they have a sister station to broadcast both games.

Though its broadcasts began in 1929, WTMJ did not begin paying the Packers for broadcast rights until 1943; it paid the team $7500 to broadcast the season. In the early 1930s, there was no exclusive right given to broadcast games, and WHBY, then based in Green Bay, often sent its own announcers to call the game. From 1933 to 1936, three additional stations carried WTMJ's radio broadcasts of Packer games: WLBL in Stevens Point (a non-commercial station owned by the state commerce department decades before the creation of Wisconsin Public Radio), WTAQ in Green Bay and WKBH in La Crosse. WSAW in Wausau and WJMS in Ironwood, Michigan started carrying the feed in 1937.

On October 27, 2021, the Packers announced that its longtime association with WTMJ would end at the end of the season, and that it had signed a deal with iHeartMedia to make sports radio station "The Game", WRNW (97.3), the team's new Milwaukee radio affiliate in 2022. Packers broadcasts already aired on iHeartMedia stations in Madison, Wisconsin, Eau Claire, Wisconsin, and Moline, Illinois. Production of the Packers Radio Network had been transferred from WTMJ to the team in 2018.

The team's Milwaukee flagship would abruptly change after week six of the 2025 season, after iHeart Media instituted a nationwide round of layoffs at many of their stations, especially including WRNW, which would see its morning and evening show hosts and program director departing the station, only months after several other personalities also left in previous layoff cycles. The company also made a deal with the Milwaukee Radio Alliance, the owners of WLDB (93.3), to transfer the station's intellectual property and branding to WRNW after MRA sold its stations to the Educational Media Foundation, and just before noon on October 13, 2025, the station transitioned to WLDB's similar adult contemporary format, and the company chose to move WRNW's sports rights to its top FM station in the market, WRIT-FM (95.7), including the Packers' play-by-play. WRNW carried two further Packers games with WRIT in a transition period.

== Extended technical details ==
Two internal radio stations are operated within the area surrounding Lambeau Field during Packers home games. The first features the Packers Radio Network play-by-play, along with public address and scoreboard announcements, providing the game call to those in attendance without the delay experienced by the uploading of the network feed via satellite. Another station carries the game's television network audio, also in sync with the PA/scoreboard.

Both feeds are located within VHF television channel 5 (76–82 MHz) and operated by the external vendor Live Sports Radio, LLC. They are FM broadcasts on frequencies below the standard American FM band, intended to require the purchase of a purpose-built Live Sports Radio tuner from the team's pro shop. However, any radio capable of receiving the extended Japanese FM band below 87.7 FM can be tuned to these frequencies.

WIXX is considered an additional "primary" station in the network. This designation only truly comes to use in the later stages of the NFL Playoffs if the Packers make it to the NFC Championship Game and the Super Bowl, where WIXX is allowed to carry the Packers Radio Network local call. All other network stations, including those licensed to communities in the Fox Cities, must carry the national Westwood One call instead in line with NFL rules, which included WAPL in the past, despite transmitting from the same tower site as WIXX.

== Programming format and announcers ==
Its primary programming consists of broadcasts of Packer home and away games to a network of 56 stations in Wisconsin, the U.P., Iowa, North Dakota, and South Dakota, along with a two-hour pre-game show and three-hour postgame show which allows listeners to call, email, or text in a sports talk format about the finished game. Wayne Larrivee has been the play-by-play announcer since 1999, while former Packer center Larry McCarren has worked as the color commentator since 1995. Both Larrivee and McCarren contribute to the team's television programs, in addition to work with Spectrum News 1 statewide, WTMJ-TV in Milwaukee and WGBA-TV in Green Bay, where McCarren was sports director from 2013 until 2015 when he began to focus exclusively on his Packers network duties.

WRIT-FM is the current Milwaukee station airing Learfield coverage of Wisconsin Badgers sports, and its sister station WOKY (920) handles conflict situations between the Badger football and men's basketball teams, giving the Packers contractually-steady coverage throughout the season on WRIT-FM on a full-market FM signal. Through full-market stations and FM translators of AM stations and migration of AM stations over to full-power FM stations, Packers play-by-play has shifted to that band throughout the network, as with most of the league's teams due to its sound clarity. The shift away from WTMJ (whose transmitter is based in the Racine County community of Union Grove, de facto giving Racine and Kenosha a very strong signal) also compelled the team to add a Racine/Kenosha station to the network for the first time in WRJN to make up for WRNW's transmitter position being stronger to the north in the market than the south (two WRJN translators based in and around Milwaukee do not carry the network in deference to WRIT-FM's rights).

== Announcers ==
- Russ Winnie: 1929–1957
- Ted Moore: 1958–1969
- Jim Irwin: 1969–1998
- Gary Bender: 1970–1974
- Lionel Aldridge: 1975–1979
- Max McGee: 1979–1998
- Larry McCarren: 1995–present
- Wayne Larrivee: 1999–present

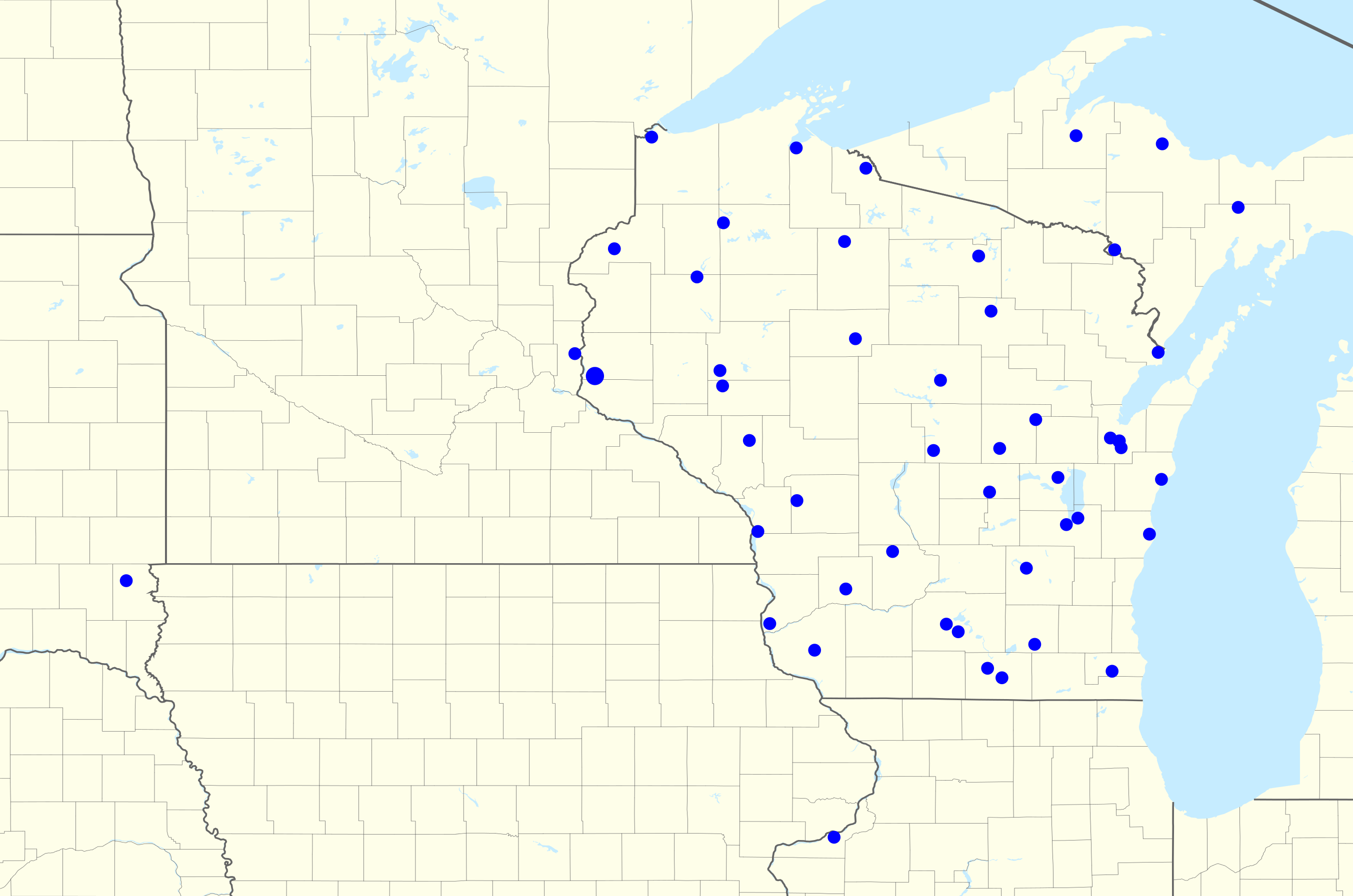
Map of radio affiliates as of 2015, including WTMJ, thus WRNW's transmitter site on the north side of Milwaukee is not shown.

== Station list ==
Network stations as of the 2022 Packers season
Callsign	Frequency	Band	City	State	Network status
WRIT-FM	95.7	FM	Milwaukee	Wisconsin	Co-Flagship
WRLO-FM	105.3	FM	Antigo	Wisconsin	Affiliate
WATW	1400	AM	Ashland	Wisconsin	Affiliate
W267CS	101.3	FM	Ashland	Wisconsin	WATW relay
WBSZ	93.3	FM	Ashland	Wisconsin	Affiliate
WBOO	102.9	FM	Baraboo	Wisconsin	Affiliate
WBEV-FM	95.3	FM	Beaver Dam	Wisconsin	Affiliate
WJMQ	92.3	FM	Clintonville	Wisconsin	Affiliate
WBIZ-FM	100.7	FM	Eau Claire	Wisconsin	Affiliate
WGLQ	97.1	FM	Escanaba	Michigan	Affiliate
KFIZ	1450	AM	Fond du Lac	Wisconsin	Affiliate
W264DN	100.7	FM	Fond du Lac	Wisconsin	KFIZ relay
WFON	107.1	FM	Fond du Lac	Wisconsin	Affiliate
WFAW	940	AM	Fort Atkinson	Wisconsin	Affiliate
WIXX	101.1	FM	Green Bay	Wisconsin	Co-Flagship
WRLS-FM	92.3	FM	Hayward	Wisconsin	Affiliate
WCUP	105.7	FM	Houghton	Michigan	Affiliate
WOBE	100.7	FM	Iron Mountain	Michigan	Affiliate
WIMI	99.7	FM	Ironwood	Michigan	Affiliate
WCLO	1230	AM	Janesville	Wisconsin	Affiliate
W224DE	92.7	FM	Janesville	Wisconsin	WCLO relay
WJVL	99.9	FM	Janesville	Wisconsin	Affiliate
W277DV	101.1	FM	Janesville	Wisconsin	WFAW relay
W251BU	98.1	FM	Kenosha	Wisconsin	WRJN relay
WKTY	580	AM	La Crosse	Wisconsin	Affiliate
K244FM	96.7	FM	La Crosse	Wisconsin	WKTY relay
WGLR-FM	97.7	FM	Lancaster	Wisconsin	Affiliate
WIBA	1310	AM	Madison	Wisconsin	Affiliate
WIBA-FM	101.5	FM	Madison	Wisconsin	Affiliate
WOMT	1240	AM	Manitowoc–Two Rivers	Wisconsin	Affiliate
W300EE	107.9	FM	Manitowoc–Two Rivers	Wisconsin	WOMT relay
WLST	95.1	FM	Marinette	Wisconsin	Affiliate
WUPZ	94.9	FM	Marquette	Michigan	Affiliate
WKEB	99.3	FM	Medford	Wisconsin	Affiliate
WFXN	1230	AM	Moline	Illinois	Affiliate
WYDR	94.3	FM	Neenah–Menasha–Fox Cities	Wisconsin	Affiliate
WCCN	1370	AM	Neillsville	Wisconsin	Affiliate
W253CN	98.5	FM	Neillsville	Wisconsin	WCCN relay
WCCN-FM	107.5	FM	Neillsville	Wisconsin	Affiliate
WCQM	98.3	FM	Park Falls	Wisconsin	Affiliate
WCMP	1350	AM	Pine City	Minnesota	Affiliate
W293DA	106.5	FM	Pine City	Minnesota	WCMP relay
WQPC	94.3	FM	Prairie du Chien	Wisconsin	Affiliate
WRJN	1400	AM	Racine	Wisconsin	Affiliate
W260CV	99.9	FM	Racine	Wisconsin	WRJN relay
WCYE	93.7	FM	Rhinelander	Wisconsin	Affiliate
WJMC-FM	96.1	FM	Rice Lake	Wisconsin	Affiliate
WRCO-FM	100.9	FM	Richland Center	Wisconsin	Affiliate
WEVR	1550	AM	River Falls	Wisconsin	Affiliate
W226CK	93.1	FM	River Falls	Wisconsin	WEVR relay
WEVR-FM	106.3	FM	River Falls	Wisconsin	Affiliate
WTCH	960	AM	Shawano	Wisconsin	Affiliate
W241CJ	96.1	FM	Shawano	Wisconsin	WTCH relay
WHBL	1330	AM	Sheboygan	Wisconsin	Affiliate
W268BR	101.5	FM	Sheboygan	Wisconsin	WHBL relay
KSOO	99.1	FM	Sioux Falls	South Dakota	Affiliate
WXCX	105.7	FM	Siren	Wisconsin	Affiliate
WCOW	97.1	FM	Sparta	Wisconsin	Affiliate
WSAU-FM	99.9	FM	Stevens Point	Wisconsin	Affiliate
WQDC	97.7	FM	Sturgeon Bay	Wisconsin	Affiliate
WDSM	710	AM	Superior	Wisconsin	Affiliate
WDUX-FM	92.7	FM	Waupaca	Wisconsin	Affiliate
WSAU	550	AM	Wausau	Wisconsin	Affiliate
W236CO	95.1	FM	Wausau	Wisconsin	WSAU relay
WAUH	102.3	FM	Wautoma	Wisconsin	Affiliate
WHTL-FM	102.3	FM	Whitehall	Wisconsin	Affiliate

Blue background indicates low-power FM translator.
