= Milwaukee Brewers Radio Network =

Official radio network of MLB's Milwaukee Brewers

- Type: Radio Network
- Branding: Brewers Radio Network
- Country: United States
- Headquarters: Milwaukee, Wisconsin
- Broadcast area: Wisconsin (33 stations); Michigan (1 station)
- Owner: Good Karma Sports
- Parent: Milwaukee Brewers
- Affiliation: Major League Baseball
- Affiliates: 34
- Official website: Brewers Radio Network

The Milwaukee Brewers Radio Network (branded as the Brewers Radio Network, with a "presented by" sponsorship by American Family Insurance) is a 34-station radio network in Wisconsin and Michigan that broadcasts baseball games and related programming for the Milwaukee Brewers of Major League Baseball, and is operated in lieu of the Brewers by Good Karma Sports. The network's flagship is WTMJ/620 in Milwaukee, Wisconsin, which was purchased by Good Karma Brands (Good Karma Sports' previous name before August 2026) in 2018. WTMJ served as the flagship station for the network for all but three years of the Brewers' existence (the exceptions being WEMP in 1970 and WISN in 1981 and 1982).

== Announcers ==
Hall of Fame member Bob Uecker was part of the Brewers Radio Network from 1971 until his death in 2025, with his last game being Game 3 of the 2024 National League Wild Card Series. Jeff Levering has been part of the Brewers Radio Network since 2015. Lane Grindle has been part of the Brewers Radio Network since 2016. Josh Maurer alternates with Levering depending on the latter's Brewers.tv schedule, where he alternates with Brian Anderson.

== Programming ==
=== Pre-game ===
The pre-game show is entitled as the On-Deck Show Built By Menards, and usually features an interview with Brewers manager Pat Murphy and a player before each game, along with lineups, weather conditions, and/or roof opened/closed status for either home or road games.

=== Post-game ===
The post-game show is entitled the Sartori Cheese Post Game Show, which is usually done by either by Levering or Grindle.

== Stations ==

=== Affiliates (34 stations) ===
==== Wisconsin ====
City	Callsign	Frequency
Antigo	WACD	106.1 FM
Appleton	WHBY	1150 AM
Appleton	WHBY	103.5/106.3 FM
Ashland	WATW	1400 AM
Ashland	WATW	101.3 FM
Beaver Dam	WBEV	1430 AM
Berlin	WISS	1100 AM
Berlin	WISS	98.7 FM
Black River Falls	WWIS-FM	99.7 FM
Eagle River	WRJO	94.5 FM
Eau Claire	WAYY	790 AM
Eau Claire	WAYY	105.1 FM
Fond du Lac	KFIZ	1450 AM
Green Bay	WTAQ	1360 AM
Green Bay	WTAQ	97.5 FM
Hayward	WBZH	910 AM
Iron River	WNXR	107.3 FM
Janesville	WCLO	1230 AM
Janesville	WCLO	92.7 FM
La Crosse	WKTY	580 AM
La Crosse	WKTY	96.7 FM
Madison	WTLX	100.5 FM
Manitowoc (Note: WOMT/WOMT-FM (1240 AM/98.9 FM) carry weekend broadcasts, when WCUB airs auto racing coverage.)	WCUB	980 AM
Manitowoc	WCUB	97.1 FM
Marinette	WMAM	570 AM
Medford	WIGM	1490 AM
**Milwaukee** (Note: A feed of the network without satellite delay is available on 88.5 FM within the American Family Field campus.)	**WTMJ**	**620 AM**
**Milwaukee**	**WTMJ**	**103.3 FM**
Park Falls	WCQM	98.3 FM
Platteville	WPVL	1590 AM
Prairie du Chien	WQPC	94.3 FM
Racine	WRJN	1400 AM
Racine	WRJN	99.9 FM
Reedsburg	WRDB	1400 AM
Rice Lake	WJMC	1240 AM
Richland Center	WRCE	1450 AM
Richland Center	WRCE	107.7 FM
River Falls	WEVR-FM	1550 AM
River Falls	WEVR-FM	106.3 FM
Shawano	WTCH	960 AM
Shawano	WTCH	96.1 FM
Sheboygan	WHBL	1330 AM
Sheboygan	WHBL	101.5 FM
Stevens Point	WSAU-FM	99.9 FM
Sturgeon Bay	WDOR-FM	93.9 FM
Waupaca	WDUX-FM	92.7 FM
Wausau	WSAU	550 AM
Wausau	WSAU	95.1 FM

==== Michigan ====
City	Callsign	Frequency
Iron Mountain	WHTO	106.7 FM
Ironwood	WJMS	590 AM

Bold denotes the Flagship station.

== See also ==
- List of Milwaukee Brewers broadcasters
