= WLAK =

WLAK may refer to:

- WLAK (AM), a radio station (1260 AM) licensed to serve Emery, Wisconsin, United States
- WZBU, a radio station (1530 AM) licensed to serve New Holstein, Wisconsin, which held the call sign WLAK from 2015 to 2023
- WHUN-FM, a radio station (103.5 FM) licensed to serve Huntingdon, Pennsylvania, United States, which held the call sign WLAK from 1989 to 2015
- WLIT-FM, a radio station (93.9 FM) licensed to serve Chicago, Illinois, United States, which held the call sign WLAK from 1972 to 1989
- W.L.A.K., American Christian music group
