= WHSM =

WHSM may refer to:

- WHSM-FM, a radio station (101.1 FM) licensed to serve Hayward, Wisconsin, United States
- WBZH, a radio station (910 AM) licensed to serve Hayward, Wisconsin, which held the call sign WHSM from 1957 to 2017
