= WCFW =

Radio station in Chippewa Falls, Wisconsin

- Chippewa Falls, Wisconsin; United States
- Broadcast area: Eau Claire
- Frequency: 105.7 MHz (HD Radio)
- Branding: 105.7 CFW

Programming
- Format: Adult hits
- Subchannels: HD2: Progressive talk "93.5 The Tap"

Ownership
- Owner: Civic Media; (Civic Media, Inc.)
- Sister stations: WBZH; WLAK; WLCX

History
- First air date: October 20, 1968
- Former call signs: WCFW (1968–2022); WEZY (2022–2023)
- Former frequencies: 105.5 MHz (1968–1997)
- Call sign meaning: Chippewa Falls, Wisconsin

Technical information
- Licensing authority: FCC
- Facility ID: 7874
- Class: C3
- ERP: 25,000 watts
- HAAT: 93 m (305 ft)
- Transmitter coordinates: 44°52′18″N 91°17′11″W
- Translator: HD2: 93.5 W228EP (Eau Claire)

Links
- Public license information: Public file; LMS
- Webcast: Listen live; HD2: Listen live
- Website: wcfw.fm; HD2: www.thetap.fm

WCFW (105.7 FM; "105.7 CFW") is a radio station broadcasting an adult hits format. Licensed to Chippewa Falls, Wisconsin, United States, the station serves the Eau Claire area. The station is owned by Civic Media.

The station began broadcasting as WCFW in 1968. It was owned by Pat and Roland Bushland, through their Bushland Radio Specialties, for 54 years.

== History ==
WCFW signed on October 20, 1968; the station had been owned by Roland Bushland since its inception, first with his father Roy and later with his wife Pat. Roland, who turned 29 the day the station went on the air, had grown interested in radio as a hi-fi buff. WCFW originally operated at 105.5 MHz from studios at the Bushland home east of Chippewa Falls. The facility was not originally located in Chippewa Falls because it was short-spaced by 1.5 mi (2.4 km) to an FM station in Red Wing, Minnesota.

Pat Bushland applied in 1984 to build a television station on channel 48 from the same site; however, an application by Family Group Broadcasting of Florida put the WCFW bid at a disadvantage because of FCC policies promoting diversification of media ownership, and Family Group won the construction permit for WEUX after reaching a settlement with the Bushlands. In 1988, WCFW moved its studios to the Warren Street site; the next year, after several delays, it became the last station in the Chippewa Falls–Eau Claire area to begin stereo broadcasts. Roy Bushland died in August 1990. In 1997, WCFW moved from 105.5 to 105.7 MHz as part of an increase to 25,000 watts.

In addition to its soft AC programming and hourly Associated Press newscasts, the station covered high school sports. WCFW also broadcast polka music in the early morning hours, which local farmers have claimed helps relax milking cows. Polka music formerly occupied lunchtime and early evening slots as well. It was also the last station to carry two formerly-syndicated programs: the American Institute of Physics-produced weekend feature Science Report and two daily broadcasts of The Jack Raymond Show. Jack Raymond and WCFW were the focus of a documentary called Silently Steal Away. WCFW's jingle, featuring the slogan "where FM means fine music", was part of a set of 10 jingles the station purchased from a Texas ad agency for $25; only one would be used on the air. The format, which was highly rated with older audiences, remained untouched from the station's inception. It remained a family operation: Roland performed the station's engineering (and built most of its equipment), while Pat handled advertising sales and music programming. The station carried comparatively few commercials, something it had done from the start, with most of the advertisers being longtime local businesses.

On June 20, 2022, after 54 years of ownership, Bushland Radio Specialties filed to sell WCFW and translator W256AE to Magnum Media for $600,000, marking the company's entry into the Eau Claire market. The sale closed on October 1, 2022, with the Bushlands recording an ID thanking listeners; new WEZY call letters, which Magnum had parked at a station in Portage, went into effect on November 9.

On June 5, 2023, after Magnum sold the station to Civic Media, WEZY returned to the WCFW call sign and launched an adult hits format, branded as "105.7 CFW".

== Translators ==
A translator, W256AE (99.1 FM), has broadcast in the Chippewa Falls city center since 1995 to reduce shadowing in some areas of the city. Effective February 22, 2023, the translator was licensed to move to Eau Claire on 93.5 MHz, as W228EP.

== HD Radio ==
On June 5, 2023, WCFW launched a progressive talk format on its HD2 subchannel and W228EP 93.5 FM, branded as "93.5 The Tap".

Broadcast translator for WCFW-HD2
Call sign	Frequency	City of license	FID	ERP (W)	Class	FCC info
W228EP	93.5 FM	Eau Claire, Wisconsin	7875	250	D	LMS
