= WAUN =

WAUN may mean:

- WAUN (AM), a radio station (1350 AM) licensed to serve Portage, Wisconsin, United States
- WCFW (FM), a radio station (92.7 FM) licensed to serve Kewaunee, Wisconsin, United States, which held the call signs WAUN and WAUN-FM from 1973 to 2022
