= WISS Trivia Contest =

WISS Trivia Contest was a trivia contest that was held annually on WISS between 1982 and 2005. The contest was billed as the "world's longest-running commercial trivia contest" before its 2006 cancellation.

== Radio station ==
The trivia contest began in 1982 on Hometown Broadcasting's WISS in Berlin, Wisconsin. In the late 1990s the trivia contest was simulcast on both of Hometown Broadcasting's radio stations (WISS and WBJZ-FM/WAUH). The 2005 contest was broadcast only on WAUH.

== Rules ==
The contest traditionally started on the first Saturday morning of February (often at 10:00 a.m. local time), and it ran continuously until some time on Sunday morning. The contest was 21 hours long from 1982 to 1999 and 2002 to 2003. The 2000 and 2001 contests were shortened to 9 daylight hours because WISS was unable to get a Federal Communications Commission waiver to broadcast outside its normal daytime hours. The 2004 and 2005 contests were lengthened to 22 and 23 hours, respectively.

The questions had a point value of 5, 10, 25, or 50 points. There were two difficult 50-point questions that were asked overnight.

The radio station read a question and announced its point value. Teams were given three songs (approximately 10 minutes' worth of time) to call the station's request lines with the correct answer. Teams were allowed unlimited guesses, and the phone operators would only ask for the team name after a correct guess. Teams were not allowed to continue guessing after calling in with a correct answer (the term is jamming). Any and all teams that correctly answered the question were credited with question's points.

There was no restriction or limit on the source of the guesses. Teams in the 1980s would use books for sources, but by the mid- to late 1990s teams had gone away from books in favor of using the internet. The internet and Fred L. Worth books were not considered "sources" for the purpose of contesting an answer.

The top four team were awarded cash prizes between $25 and $100.

== Trivia masters ==
The original trivia master was Steve Handrich, who presided over the contest from 1982 until 1997. Martin Jury was trivia master from 1998 until 2001, and Andy Disterhaft from 2002 until 2005.

== Sample questions ==
- 2005, question #6 (10 points): Which (United States) Presidents are buried in Tennessee?
  - Answer: Andrew Jackson, James Polk, and Andrew Johnson
- 2002, question #52 (25 points): Hakeem Olajuwon and Alex Rodriguez have both studied flexibility at what Chicago gym?
  - Answer: A.T.T.A.C.K. ATHLETICS, Incorporated
- 1999, question #1 (5 points): What is the name of Wisconsin's current Miss Teen, and what city is she from?
  - Answer: Heidi Cody - Markesan, Wisconsin
- 1995, question #69 (50 points): What does the acronym "PRETTY BLUE BATCH" mean?
  - Answer: Philadelphia Regional Exchange Tea Toddling Young Belles Letters Universal Experimental Bibliography Association To Civilized Humanity

== Annual question categories ==
- Music
- Current events
- Television/Radio
- Movies/Hollywood
- History
- Sports
- Cartoons/Comics
- General Knowledge
- plus one revolving category

== List of revolving categories ==
- 2005 World Leaders
- 2004 Food
- 2003 Major world cities
- 2002 WISS station history
- 2001 Elections
- 2000 Cats
- 1999 Holidays
- 1998 Toys
- 1997 Games
- 1996 Double Jeopardy (35-point questions that had been asked in a previous contest)
- 1995 Acronyms
- 1994 Big Business
- 1993 Religions
- 1992 Express Yourself
- 1991 American military conflicts
- 1990 The 1980s decade
- 1989 Listening/Audio Questions
- 1988 Transportation
- 1987 Wisconsin
- 1986 Disasters
- 1985 Cartoons
- 1984 Olympics
- 1983 Soap Operas
- 1982 None
