= WLWB =

WLWB may refer to:

- WLFM (FM), a radio station (103.9 FM) licensed to serve Lawrenceburg, Tennessee, United States, which held the call sign WLWB from 2019 to 2022
- WZBU, a radio station (1520 AM) licensed to serve New Holstein, Wisconsin, United States, which held the call sign WLWB from 2012 to 2015
