= WCBN =

WCBN may refer to:

- WCBN-FM, a radio station (88.3 FM) licensed to serve Ann Arbor, Michigan, United States
- WBZH, a radio station (910 AM) licensed to serve Hayward, Wisconsin, United States, which held the call sign WCBN from 2017 to 2022
