= WSCM =

WSCM may refer to:

- WSCM (FM), a radio station (95.7 FM) licensed to serve Baldwin, Wisconsin, United States
- WSCM-LP, a former low-power radio station licensed to serve Moncks Corner, South Carolina, United States
- World Scout Collectors Meeting
- World Symposium on Choral Music, a triennial event about choral music
