= Civic Media =

American radio broadcasting company

- Type: Privately held company
- Industry: Mass media
- Genre: Radio broadcasting
- Founded: 2022
- Founder: Mike Crute; Sage Weil
- Headquarters: Madison, Wisconsin, United States
- Key people: Sage Weil (President/CEO)
- Website: civicmedia.us

Civic Media is an American radio broadcasting company based in Madison, Wisconsin. As of October 2026, the company owns 42 stations across Wisconsin, Michigan, Minnesota, Iowa, and Illinois.

== History ==
The company was formed in 2022 by Mike Crute and Sage Weil. On September 13, they acquired WSCM and WBZH from Zoe Communications. On September 23, it was announced that Civic would acquire WZBU and translator from Metro North Communications, Inc., and the sale was consummated on January 17, 2023.

In 2023, Civic acquires WCQM and WPFP from The Marks Group for $210,000.

In November 2024, Civic announced they would acquire another station from Zoe Communications (WHSM-FM and its translator) for $360,000.

In February 2025, it was announced that Civic would acquire another station from Zoe Communications (WELY) for $70,000.

In April 2025, Civic announced a new weekday lineup for its radio stations. Also the same month, Civic announced they would be purchasing WRPN and WAUH from Hometown Broadcasting LLC for $1.4 million.

In July 2025, Civic announced they would acquire five stations in Michigan (WIMI, WJMS, WKMJ-FM, WMPL, and WUPY) for $1.55 million.

In September 2025, Civic announced they would buy WZTI from Milwaukee Radio Alliance (a partnership between Times-Shamrock Communications and All-Pro Broadcasting), as well as FM translators W262CJ and W297BY for $465,000. The sale was completed on March 23, 2026.

In December 2025, Civic announced they would buy WNOV, making it their first Black-owned radio station acquisition, as well as buying the Milwaukee Courier newspaper for $1.4 million. The sale was completed on August 4, 2026.

On April 30, 2026, Civic announced it established the Milwaukee Black Media Trust, a new ownership who help the local Black media remain independent, with the trust including Milwaukee Courier, WNOV and WGKB (owned by Good Karma Sports) and would later own and operate them.

On September 18, 2026, Civic announced its intent to acquire four stations in the Waterloo–Cedar Rapids, Iowa area from NRG Media under its new subsidiary Cedar Basin Media; on September 25, the price was announced at $1.1 million.

In October 2026, Civic announced they had reached an agreement to acquire 13 stations in Illinois and Iowa from Pritchard Broadcasting Corp., Titan Broadcasting, and Galesburg Broadcasting Company for an undisclosed amount.

== Radio stations ==
| City/market | Stations | Frequency |
|---|---|---|
| Amery, Wisconsin | WLAK | 1260 AM |
| Baldwin–Wisconsin Dells, Wisconsin | WSCM | 95.7 FM |
| Baraboo, Wisconsin | WRPQ | 740 AM |
| Berlin, Wisconsin | WISS | 1100 AM |
| Burlington, Iowa | KDMG | 103.1 FM |
| Burlington, Iowa | KGRS | 107.3 FM |
| Burlington, Iowa | KKMI | 93.5 FM |
| Burlington, Iowa | KBUR-FM | 99.3 FM |
| Chippewa Falls–Eau Claire, Wisconsin | WCFW | 105.7 FM |
| Columbus–Madison, Wisconsin | WMDX | 1580 AM |
| Denmark–Green Bay, Wisconsin | WGBW | 1590 AM |
| Ely, Minnesota | WELY | 1450 AM |
| Greenfield–Milwaukee, Wisconsin | WRJM | 1290 AM |
| Hancock, Michigan | WMPL | 920 AM |
| Hancock, Michigan | WKMJ-FM | 93.5 FM |
| Hayward, Wisconsin | WBZH | 910 AM |
| Hayward, Wisconsin | WHSM-FM | 101.1 FM |
| Ironwood, Michigan | WJMS | 590 AM |
| Ironwood, Michigan | WIMI | 99.7 FM |
| Jackson–Milwaukee, Wisconsin | WAUK | 540 AM |
| La Crosse, Wisconsin | WLCX | 1490 AM |
| Milwaukee, Wisconsin | WNOV | 860 AM |
| Nekoosa–Wausau, Wisconsin | WIRI | 105.5 FM |
| New Holstein–Appleton, Wisconsin | WZBU | 1520 AM |
| Ontonagon, Michigan | WUPY | 101.1 FM |
| Park Falls, Wisconsin | WPFP | 980 AM |
| Park Falls, Wisconsin | WCQM | 98.3 FM |
| Racine–Milwaukee, Wisconsin | WRJN | 1400 AM |
| Richland Center, Wisconsin | WRCE | 1450 AM |
| Richland Center, Wisconsin | WRCO-FM | 100.9 FM |
| Ripon, Wisconsin | WRPN | 1600 AM |
| Wausau, Wisconsin | WXCO | 1230 AM |
| Wautoma, Wisconsin | WAUH | 102.3 FM |
| Wisconsin Rapids–Wausau, Wisconsin | WFHR | 1320 AM |
