= WKMJ =

WKMJ can refer to:

- WKMJ-FM, a radio station (93.5 FM) licensed to Hancock, Michigan, United States
- WKMJ-TV, a television station (channel 34, virtual 68) licensed to Louisville, Kentucky, United States, part of Kentucky Educational Television
