= WIMI =

Radio station in Ironwood, Michigan

Coordinates: 46.424°N 90.248°W

- Ironwood, Michigan; United States
- Frequency: 99.7 MHz
- Branding: 99.7 The Storm

Programming
- Format: Classic rock
- Affiliations: Packers Radio Network

Ownership
- Owner: Civic Media, Inc.
- Sister stations: WJMS; WKMJ-FM; WMPL; WUPY

History
- First air date: November 13, 1975
- Call sign meaning: Ironwood, Michigan, or Wisconsin and Michigan

Technical information
- Licensing authority: FCC
- Facility ID: 57226
- Class: C1
- ERP: 100,000 watts
- HAAT: 171 meters (561 ft)
- Translator: 102.3 W272AY (Park Falls)

Links
- Public license information: Public file; LMS
- Website: www.wimifm.com

WIMI (99.7 FM, "The Storm") is a radio station broadcasting a classic rock format. Licensed to Ironwood, Michigan, it first began broadcasting in 1974, with its signal covering most of the western Upper Peninsula and the extreme northern portion of Wisconsin; because of the effects of tropospheric ducting, it is also easily heard across Lake Superior in Duluth, Minnesota to the point that in 2017, it asked the Federal Communications Commission to move a recently launched VCY America translator on 99.7 in Duluth to move dial positions due to crossover interference (it moved to 97.7).

== History ==
After years as a construction permit (including briefly being WJMS-FM), WIMI went on the air Thursday, November 13, 1975. Initially, the station ran Drake-Chenault's "Hitparade" format (later Contempo 300); the station used Drake programming well into the 1980s and eventually morphed into an adult hits format. In 2017, the station switched from a variety of adult contemporary formats to classic rock. Local personalities include Bill Swift and Sam Erspamer.

In 2017, the station was fined $4,000 by the Federal Communications Commission for originating programming directly from its translator station in Park Falls, Wisconsin. The translator had aired music while the parent station aired Green Bay Packers games that the Park Falls station could not air for territorial reasons to protect WCQM, that town's affiliate.

In July 2025, it was announced that WIMI (along with its sister stations) would be acquired by Civic Media for $465,000.
