= WMPL =

Radio station in Hancock, Michigan

Coordinates: 47°06′05″N 88°35′26″W

- Hancock, Michigan; United States
- Broadcast area
- Frequency: 920 kHz
- Branding: Yooper 107.3

Programming
- Format: Oldies
- Affiliations: 24/7 News

Ownership
- Owner: Civic Media, Inc.
- Sister stations: WIMI, WJMS, WKMJ-FM, WUPY

History
- First air date: March 2, 1957
- Call sign meaning: Miller, Paulson, Locateli

Technical information
- Licensing authority: FCC
- Facility ID: 13868
- Class: D
- Power: 1,000 watts day 206 watts night
- Translator: 107.3 W297CD (Hancock)

Links
- Public license information: Public file; LMS
- Webcast: Listen live
- Website: yooper.fm

WMPL (920 AM, "Yooper 107.3") is a radio station located in Hancock, Michigan, which broadcasts an oldies format.

On April 5, 2026, WMPL changed their format from talk/sports to oldies, branded as "Yooper 107.3".

Former logo
