= WGBW =

Radio station in Denmark, Wisconsin

- Denmark, Wisconsin; United States
- Broadcast area: Green Bay metropolitan area
- Frequency: 1590 kHz
- Branding: 97.9 WGBW

Programming
- Language: English
- Format: Oldies
- Affiliations: ABC News Radio

Ownership
- Owner: Civic Media; (Civic Media, Inc.)
- Sister stations: WISS, WZBU

History
- First air date: October 29, 1951; 74 years ago
- Former call signs: WTRW (1951–1968); WQTC (1968–1977); WRTR (1977–1983); WTRW (1983–2006)
- Call sign meaning: Green Bay, Wisconsin

Technical information
- Licensing authority: FCC
- Facility ID: 74127
- Class: B
- Power: 10,000 watts (day); 500 watts (night)
- Transmitter coordinates: 44°18′50.00″N 87°47′16.00″W
- Translator: 97.9 W250CV (Green Bay)

Links
- Public license information: Public file; LMS
- Webcast: Listen live
- Website: wgbw.fm

WGBW (1590 AM) is a radio station licensed to serve Denmark, Wisconsin. The station airs an oldies format, featuring songs from the late 1950s to the early 1970s, and is branded "Local News and Timeless Hits." WGBW is owned by Sage Weil, through licensee Civic Media, Inc.

== History ==
The station had been on the air since October 29, 1951, licensed to Two Rivers, Wisconsin and serving the Manitowoc area, most notably under the WTRW call sign. In September 2006, the station was assigned the WGBW call sign by the FCC, part of an effort by station ownership to move the station from the Two Rivers/Manitowoc area to the larger Green Bay radio market. After four years of applications and amendments, the FCC granted WGBW a construction permit in August 2008 to move the station's city of license from Two Rivers to Denmark, Wisconsin, and to increase its daytime and nighttime broadcast power. On September 14, 2011, WGBW relaunched with its new 10,000 watt day/500 watt night signal from its new transmitter site in Denmark, Wisconsin. The station changed owners effective January 17, 2023.

For several years, WGBW aired a satellite-fed oldies music format; the station had carried Dial Global's "Kool Gold" service until October 15, 2008, when it moved to Citadel Media's "The True Oldies Channel". The station also carried top-of-the-hour newscasts from ABC News (it had carried CNN Radio and NBC Radio News newscasts prior to January 2010). WGBW has also featured broadcasts of Denmark Vikings high school sporting events.

On January 2, 2013, WGBW dropped its oldies format and became a full-time affiliate of ESPN Radio, replacing WDUZ as the Green Bay market's ESPN affiliate. Though the move meant the loss of its programming on the FM signal WDUZ provided (at 107.5 FM), the move to WGBW gave ESPN Radio live clearance of its full daily sports talk schedule in Green Bay for the first time, including some shows that WDUZ preempted in favor of local talk programming (among them Mike and Mike in the Morning and The Herd with Colin Cowherd).

On April 3, 2013, WGBW switched back to True Oldies and ended its ESPN Radio affiliation, blaming a crowded market in the Green Bay area for sports talk in leaving the format after only three months. ESPN has yet to re-launch a radio affiliate in the Green Bay market, as of Spring 2023. Programming of oldies continued until the station was sold in January 2023.

On September 23, 2022, it was announced that Civic Media would acquire WGBW and translator W250CV, along with sister station WLAK and its translator, W230DA. The purchase, at a price of $937,000, was consummated on December 29, 2022.

On January 18, 2023, WGBW changed its format from oldies to progressive talk.

On August 1, 2025, the station switched back to oldies and is debuting a live, local morning show and other DJs and show hosts throughout the day.
