= WELY =

Radio station in Ely, Minnesota

WELY and WELY-FM

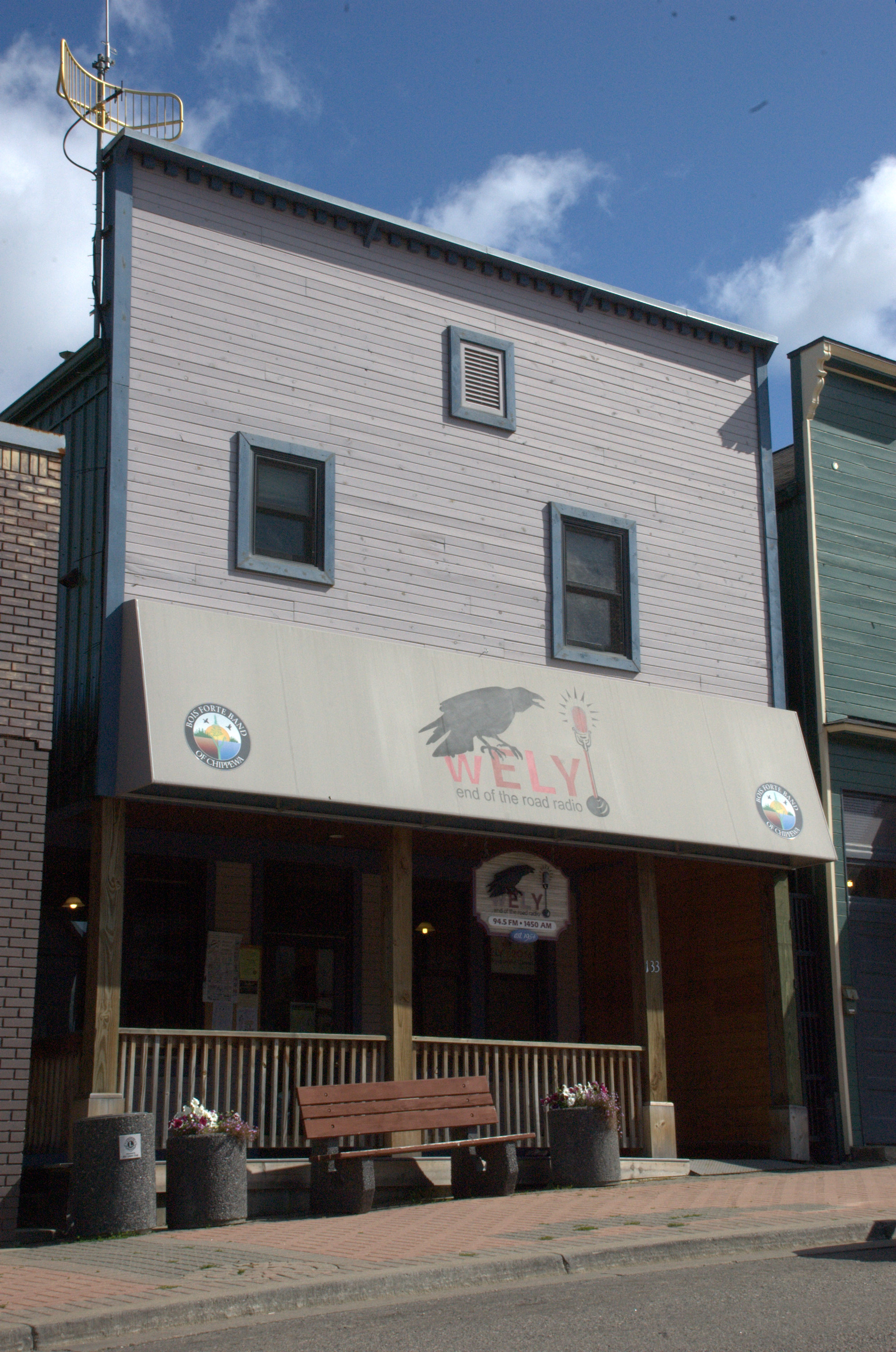
- Former WELY studios

Ely, Minnesota; United States
- Broadcast area: Boundary Waters Canoe Area; Arrowhead Region
- Frequencies: WELY: 1450 kHz; WELY-FM: 94.5 MHz
- Branding: "Hometown Radio 1450/103.9"

Programming
- Affiliations: Minnesota Twins Radio Network

Ownership
- Owner: Civic Media, Inc.

History
- First air date: WELY: October 2, 1954; WELY-FM: July 25, 1992
- Former call signs: WELY-FM: KQEK (January 17-June 5, 1992)
- Former frequencies: WELY-FM: 92.1 MHz
- Call sign meaning: Ely, Minnesota

Technical information
- Licensing authority: FCC
- Facility ID: WELY: 5386; WELY-FM: 5385
- Class: WELY: C; WELY-FM: A
- Power: WELY: 770 watts
- ERP: WELY-FM: 35,000 watts
- HAAT: WELY-FM: 100 meters (330 ft)
- Transmitter coordinates: WELY: 47°53′39.7″N 91°51′50.5″W; WELY-FM: 47°53′39.7″N 91°51′50.5″W
- Translator(s): 103.9 K280AT (Ely)

Links
- Public license information: WELY: Public file; LMS; WELY-FM: Public file; LMS
- Webcast: Listen live
- Website: www.wely.fm

WELY (1450 AM) and WELY-FM (94.5 FM) are a pair of simulcast radio stations based in the town of Ely, Minnesota, United States. WELY serves the Boundary Waters Canoe Area, which Ely is a popular gateway to, and surrounding towns and areas of northeastern Minnesota. The stations were sold to Wisconsin company Civic Media as of February 2025.

WELY (AM) was founded in 1954; WELY-FM was added in 1992. The new radio station, established as part of the 2025 revival of the station, is downtown. Both stations share a transmitter site south of town.

== History ==
=== WELY (AM) ===
WELY signed on the air on October 2, 1954. Its first owner was Charles B. Persons, a Minnesota engineer who also constructed the station. Persons sold the station to WELY Corporation in 1959, and it would be operated as a side business by Vincent T. Hallett for the next 17 years. WELY changed hands again in 1963 when WELY Corporation sold the station to North Central Video, which sold the station to Northern Lakes Corporation in 1967. WELY's next owner would come in 1976, when the Northern Lakes Corporation sold it to BJL Broadcasting Corporation. In 1987, WELY suspended operations for a time due to financial difficulty, which was featured as a news story on KSTP-TV.

=== WELY-FM ===
WELY-FM signed on the air on July 25, 1992. The original callsign was KQEK, as issued on January 17, 1992, but was changed to WELY-FM on June 5, 1992.

=== As a pair ===
WELY was owned by retired CBS broadcaster Charles Kuralt from 1995 until his death on July 4, 1997. In 1999, WELY-AM-FM transferred from the estate of Suzanna Baird Kuralt to her estate's executors, Susan Bowers and Lisa Bowers White, who sold the stations to Alice L. Hill and Janice Nagel Erickson, a Twin Cities transplant. In 2005, it was purchased by the Bois Forte Band of Chippewa.

The stations went silent on December 1, 2022, as the transition began to the new owner Zoe Communications, Inc. of Shell Lake, Wisconsin; the $130,000 sale did not include the studios in downtown Ely, which the Bois Forte Band of Chippewa retained. The sale was consummated on April 20, 2023.

The WELY stations continued to operate intermittently under Zoe, in part due to two managerial deaths. In February 2025, Zoe filed to sell the stations to Civic Media, marking that company's first acquisition outside of Wisconsin, for $70,000. The stations returned to the air with test programming in March 2025, during which WELY-FM experienced transmitter problems; a full relaunch is planned for late spring or early summer. The stations will be programmed with music formats, with some programming simulcast on AM and FM, and will maintain their longtime carriage of Minnesota Twins baseball; the center-left political programming that Civic Media airs on some of its Wisconsin stations will not be part of the WELY lineup.

In April 2025, the station came back on the air.

== See also ==
- List of community radio stations in the United States
