= WCCX =

Coordinates: 43.004°N 88.228°W

- Waukesha, Wisconsin; United States
- Broadcast area: Waukesha/Milwaukee
- Frequency: 104.5 MHz
- Branding: 104.5 The X

Programming
- Format: Defunct

Ownership
- Owner: Carroll University

History
- First air date: September 1, 1978
- Call sign meaning: Carroll; College; The X

Technical information
- Licensing authority: FCC
- Facility ID: 68288
- Class: D
- ERP: 13 watts
- HAAT: 15 meters (49 ft)

Links
- Public license information: Public file; LMS

WCCX (104.5 FM) was a student-run college radio station licensed to Waukesha, Wisconsin, which served the Carroll University campus and area immediately surrounding it. It was owned by Carroll University. WCCX was also known as "The X" and "The voice of Carroll University," and played an eclectic mix typical of college radio, including music from both major label and independent artists. WCCX is also the only media outlet covering Carroll Pioneer athletic events. The original call sign for the station was to be WCCZ and the frequency 88.1 MHz. This frequency was found to interfere with the audio of WITI TV channel 6 within the City of Waukesha whenever WCCZ broadcast. Shortly after this, Carroll College applied to change the license to 104.5 MHz and use the call sign WCCX.

The station was a completely student run organization at the college. The WCCX studios were located in the lower level of the Carroll University "Campus Center" (student union) building. The Campus Center building also housed the antenna from which WCCX transmitted its 13 watt signal, which could be heard throughout most of the city of Waukesha. Upon leaving the city in any direction, WCCX's signal was overtaken by WSLD, a full-power commercial station broadcasting from Whitewater, 30 miles away.

WCCX discontinued operation on May 31, 2022 at 4:30 PM. The university surrendered the station's license to the Federal Communications Commission on May 4, 2023, who cancelled it the same day.
