= WUPY =

Radio station in Ontonagon, Michigan

Coordinates: 46.750°N 89.180°W

- Ontonagon, Michigan; United States
- Frequency: 101.1 MHz
- Branding: Y-101

Programming
- Format: Country
- Affiliations: ABC News Radio; Michigan Radio Network

Ownership
- Owner: Civic Media, Inc.
- Sister stations: WIMI, WJMS, WKMJ-FM, WMPL

History
- First air date: March 31, 1983
- Former call signs: WONT (1983–1989)
- Call sign meaning: Upper Peninsula Y

Technical information
- Licensing authority: FCC
- Facility ID: 58318
- Class: C1
- ERP: 100,000 watts
- HAAT: 212 meters (696 ft)

Links
- Public license information: Public file; LMS
- Website: wupy101.com

WUPY (101.1 FM / RF channel 266, "Y-101") is a radio station broadcasting a country music format in Ontonagon, Michigan, where it is licensed by the U.S. Federal Communications Commission. The station is owned by Civic Media. The studio is located at 622 River Street in downtown Ontonagon.

== History ==
Under the ownership of Ontonagon County Broadcasting, Inc. (d.b.a. S & S Broadcasting, Inc.), the station was granted a construction permit for the original tower by the Federal Communications Commission on December 12, 1982. A broadcast license was subsequently granted on September 29, 1987. The station signed on the air on October 1, 1987 under the callsign "WONT" at 98.3 MHz (RF channel 252) broadcasting at 30,000 watts effective radiated power (ERP).

As part of a major refit of station operations, the station changed its callsign to "WUPY" and its frequency to its present 101.1 MHz (RF channel 266) on May 24, 1989. The station began formally broadcasting under the "WUPY" callsign on August 18, 1989.

On September 22, 1998, the station received authorization from the Federal Communications Commission to bring their second generation transmitter online which increased their broadcast effective radiated power to 100,000 watts.

In September of 2005, the station filed a request with the Federal Communications Commission to temporarily go silent as the station experienced severe financial instability that threatened continued operation of the station. The request was granted and the station indeed went off the air on September 26, 2005.

S & S Broadcasting, Inc. transferred station ownership to SNRN Broadcasting, Inc. via buyout process on December 15, 2005. The station returned to on-air service on January 26, 2006 after being off-air for 4 months.

Previous logo

In late 2006, the station got approval from the Federal Communications Commission to move transmitter operations from the original station tower (which the station directly privately owned) to leased space on a third-party owned tower (which they presently use). The two towers were approximately 800 meters (2,600 ft) apart from one another.

In January 2023, there was an agreement to sell the station to BTC USA Holdings Management, Inc. (d.b.a. Frontier Media) as part of a multi-station purchase agreement with SNRN Broadcasting Inc, however this sale never closed as BTC USA Holdings Management went in receivership shortly before the sale was to be finalized.

In July 2025, it was announced that this station (along with its sister stations) would be acquired by Civic Media for $465,000. The sale completed with the FCC acceptance of the broadcast license assignment transfer in August 2025. The station's current license under Civic Media is valid until October 2028.

== Technical details ==
WUPY broadcasts on 101.1 Mhz FM or FCC RF channel 226. The transmitter broadcasts at 100,000 watts effective radiated power (ERP) and has an effective coverage radius of 105 kilometres (65 mi) under typical atmospheric conditions. The station can typically be received as far south as Eagle River, Wisconsin, as far west as Ironwood, Michigan and as far east as Three Lakes, Michigan.

The station transmitter tower is located outside of Rockland, Michigan just east of U.S. Highway 45. The transmitting antenna is mounted at the top of a private tower which stands at 128 meters (420 ft) above ground level. The tower itself is located on a natural bluff which gives the transmitter an effective height above average terrain (HAAT) of 212 meters (696 ft).

== Programming ==
WUPY exclusively airs a country music format, including all genre artists dating as far back as the 1930s. The station includes regular weekly and daily programs. The station features local talent programs including: Jan Tucker (host of The Jan Tucker Show), Tom Schneider (host of The Tom Schnieder Polka Show), and "Deer Hunters Round-Up" (during the local deer hunting season).

WUPY also includes church service program broadcasting (often live) on Sundays, typically from 7:00 AM to 10:00 AM EST. In support of the local community, WUPY also routinely broadcasts coverage of high school sporting events including basketball and football games when in season. The station also broadcasts at specific local interest events when held.

The station also features syndicate shows including: "The Lia Show", "After Midnight", "The Crook & Chase Countdown", "Into the Blue", and "Country Hit Makers."
