= WRPN (AM) =

Radio station in Ripon, Wisconsin

- Ripon, Wisconsin; United States
- Frequency: 1600 kHz
- Branding: 93.1 The Wave

Programming
- Format: Full-service, soft oldies and AC and talk

Ownership
- Owner: Civic Media Inc.
- Sister stations: WAUH

History
- First air date: 1957
- Former call signs: WCWC (1957–1998)
- Call sign meaning: Ripon

Technical information
- Licensing authority: FCC
- Facility ID: 54489
- Class: B
- Power: 5,000 watts
- Transmitter coordinates: 43°49′1.00″N 88°50′49.00″W
- Translator: 93.1 W226CQ (Ripon)

Links
- Public license information: Public file; LMS
- Webcast: Listen live
- Website: wrpn.fm

WRPN (1600 kHz) is a commercial AM radio station broadcasting a full-service, soft oldies and AC and talk format. Licensed to the city of Ripon, Wisconsin, United States, the station is currently owned by Civic Media. Its original call letters were WCWC, which stood for "Central Wisconsin Canning", the owners of the station. WCWC at one time also had a co-owned FM station, first at 95.9 MHz and later at 96.1 MHz. The call letters were originally WCWC-FM, then later WYUR.

In April 2025, Civic Media bought the station and WAUH from Hometown Broadcasting LLC for $1.4 million.

== Previous logo ==
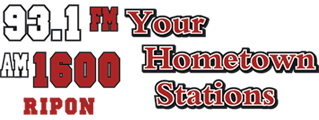
