= WISS (AM) =

Radio station in Berlin, Wisconsin

- Berlin, Wisconsin; United States
- Broadcast area: Green Lake; Waushara
- Frequency: 1100 kHz
- Branding: WISS 96.5 / 98.3 FM - 1100 AM

Programming
- Language: English
- Format: Progressive talk
- Affiliations: ABC News Radio; Milwaukee Brewers Radio Network

Ownership
- Owner: Civic Media; (Civic Media, Inc.)
- Sister stations: WGBW, WZBU

History
- First air date: 1971; 55 years ago
- Former frequencies: 1090 kHz (1971–2006)
- Call sign meaning: Wisconsin's Service Station

Technical information
- Licensing authority: FCC
- Facility ID: 34907
- Class: D
- Power: 2,500 watts (day); 1,600 watts (critical hours)
- Transmitter coordinates: 43°56′55″N 88°59′08″W
- Translator: 98.3 W252DR (Oshkosh)
- Repeater: 1520 WZBU (New Holstein)

Links
- Public license information: Public file; LMS
- Website: wiss.fm

WISS (1100 kHz) is an American AM radio station (with two FM translators) broadcasting a progressive talk radio format, featuring local news and information as well as statewide programming originating from the Civic Media network. It is licensed to Berlin, Wisconsin, and serves central Wisconsin and Fox Valley. It formerly operated at 1090 kHz. The station is owned by Sage Weil, through licensee Civic Media, Inc., acquired in 2022.

WISS changed its music format from classic country to soft oldies on February 2, 2009. Artists heard as part of the new format, according to the station's website, include The Beatles, Carpenters, The Supremes, Barry Manilow, Anne Murray, Frank Sinatra, Kenny Rogers, and Neil Diamond.

The station ran an annual trivia contest between 1982 and 2005. The contest was billed as the "world's longest running commercial trivia contest" before its end in 2006.

It has added a simulcast on 98.3 FM because AM 1100 does not operate all day. The 98.3 simulcast is available 24 hours a day, and is in operation before, during, and after AM 1100 is on the air.

On May 5, 2011, WISS replaced classic hits with news/talk introducing themselves as a Fox News Radio station.

In 2014, WISS received a U.S. Federal Communications Commission construction permit to increase power to 50,000 watts day and 20,000 watts critical hours. The power increase was never built.

On May 9, 2016, WISS changed its format from news/talk to classic hits, simulcasting WAUH 102.3 FM Wautoma and the translator moved from 97.3 FM Berlin to 98.3 FM Oshkosh.

On September 30, 2022, Civic Media acquired WISS. On October 7, 2022, it dropped its simulcast with WAUH and changed its format to progressive news/talk as "Air Support Radio". With the format change, WISS opened a new studio in downtown Oshkosh with the intention of originating local programming.

== See also ==
- WISS Trivia Contest

== Translators ==
In addition to the main station, WISS is relayed by an additional translator to widen its broadcast area.

Call sign	Frequency	City of license	FID	ERP (W)	Class	FCC info
W252DR	98.3 FM	Oshkosh, Wisconsin	144663	250	D	LMS
