= WWIS-FM =

- Black River Falls, Wisconsin; United States
- Broadcast area: La Crosse, Wisconsin
- Frequency: 99.7 MHz
- Branding: The Star

Programming
- Format: Classic country
- Affiliations: CBS News Radio; NBC News Radio; Milwaukee Brewers Radio Network

Ownership
- Owner: WWIS Radio, Inc.
- Sister stations: WWIS (AM)

History
- First air date: January 21, 1991
- Call sign meaning: Wisconsin

Technical information
- Licensing authority: FCC
- Facility ID: 74189
- Class: C3
- ERP: 25,000 watts
- HAAT: 100.0 meters
- Transmitter coordinates: 44°19′11.00″N 90°53′31.00″W

Links
- Public license information: Public file; LMS
- Webcast: Listen Live
- Website: wwisradio.com

WWIS-FM (99.7 MHz) is a radio station broadcasting a classic country format. It is licensed to Black River Falls, Wisconsin, United States, the station serves the La Crosse, Wisconsin, area. The station is currently owned by WWIS Radio, Inc., and features programming from CBS News Radio and NBC News Radio.

== Current programming ==
WWIS-FM carries Milwaukee Brewers baseball, as well as basketball and football from the University of Wisconsin.
