= WKMJ-FM =

Radio station in Hancock, Michigan

Coordinates: 47.102°N 88.570°W

- Hancock, Michigan; United States
- Broadcast area
- Frequency: 93.5 MHz
- Branding: Mix 93

Programming
- Format: Hot adult contemporary

Ownership
- Owner: Civic Media, Inc.
- Sister stations: WIMI, WJMS, WMPL, WUPY

History
- Former call signs: WMPL-FM (????–1981); WZRK (1981–1998); WMPL-FM (1998–2001)

Technical information
- Licensing authority: FCC
- Facility ID: 13867
- Class: C3
- ERP: 13,500 watts
- HAAT: 139 meters

Links
- Public license information: Public file; LMS
- Webcast: Listen Live
- Website: www.themix93.com

WKMJ-FM (93.5 MHz) is a radio station broadcasting a hot adult contemporary format, licensed to Hancock, Michigan.

Mix 93 airs Westwood One's Hot AC format with a local morning drive show during the day on weekdays. Mix93 is also the exclusive radio voice of the Michigan Tech Huskies, covering all home and away hockey, football, and basketball games, as well as select volleyball games. Dirk Hembroff currently serves as the "Voice of the Huskies," and is in his seventh year as the radio play-by-play commentator for Huskies Hockey. In addition to covering games, Mix93 also airs a program entitled "Huskies Drive Time," a half hour of programming dedicated to Michigan Tech Huskies sports, including game highlights, coach interviews, and discussion.

== History ==
The station was known as "Z93" WZRK with a CHR format throughout the 1980s, and has programmed a variety of formats since, including oldies and contemporary Christian music.

Previous logo

WKMJ, along with its sister station, WMPL-AM, were purchased in 2006 from Victor Broadcasting Corp. by J & J Broadcasting. J & J sold WKMJ to California based BTC USA Holdings Management in 2022. This sale never closed as BTC USA Holdings went into receivership.

In July 2025, it was announced that WKMJ (along with its sister stations) would be acquired by Civic Media for $465,000.
