= WSCM (FM) =

Radio station in Baldwin, Wisconsin

- Baldwin, Wisconsin; United States
- Broadcast area: St Croix County
- Frequency: 95.7 MHz
- Branding: 95.7 St. Croix Country

Programming
- Format: Country music

Ownership
- Owner: Civic Media; (Civic Media, Inc.)
- Sister stations: WLAK

History
- First air date: 1974
- Former call signs: WRDN-FM (1973–2002); WYLT (2002); WJRV (2002–2003); WDMO (2003–2022)

Technical information
- Licensing authority: FCC
- Facility ID: 65632
- Class: A
- ERP: 4,000 watts
- HAAT: 124 meters
- Transmitter coordinates: 44°56′33″N 92°24′59″W
- Repeater: 1260 WLAK (Amery)

Links
- Public license information: Public file; LMS
- Webcast: Listen Live
- Website: wscm.fm

WSCM (95.7 FM) is a radio station, broadcasting a country music radio format in Baldwin, Wisconsin. The station is currently owned by Civic Media.

== History ==
The station originated as WRDN-FM in Durand, Wisconsin, as the FM companion to WRDN 1430 AM. The station was under construction by 1973, when the FCC granted a modification of its construction permit extending the completion date to February 24, 1974. The FCC granted a license covering the new Durand FM station on November 29, 1974. A preserved 1974 station identification for WRDN-FM is also listed in an Upper Midwest aircheck archive.

WRDN-FM operated for decades on 95.9 MHz in Durand. The 1988 edition of The FM Atlas listed WRDN-FM at 95.9 in Durand with 930 watts and a height above average terrain of 152 meters. By 1995, the station was listed as a country outlet, with Gene Kirchner as general manager and music director and Kevin Aliar as program director. Kirchner owned WRDN and WRDN-FM from 1986 until 2001.

Zoe Communications purchased WRDN and WRDN-FM from F.M. Radio Network in 2001. The station later used the call signs WYLT, WJRV, and WDMO before becoming WSCM in 2022.

In 2008, Zoe Communications filed to move WDMO from Durand to Baldwin, Wisconsin, under application BPH-20081010AOZ. The move changed the station from 95.9 MHz in Durand to 95.7 MHz in Baldwin. The FCC granted the license to cover the Baldwin facility on February 2, 2012. WDMO began operating from Baldwin in April 2012 as "Thunder Country 95.7", using 4,000 watts from a tower southwest of Baldwin near Interstate 94 and serving St. Croix County, Pierce County, and portions of the eastern Twin Cities suburbs.

The Durand AM station was separated from the FM after the Baldwin move. Durand Broadcasting bought WRDN 1430 AM from Zoe Communications and returned it to local country programming in Durand, while the former WRDN-FM continued as WDMO in Baldwin.

In 2022, Civic Media agreed to buy WDMO, WXCE 1260 AM in Amery, translator W297CU, and WCBN 910 AM in Hayward from Zoe Communications for $700,000. The FCC granted the assignment of WDMO from Zoe Communications to Civic Media on November 18, 2022. The station adopted the WSCM call sign and became "95.7 St. Croix Country", a country station serving the St. Croix Valley from studios at 114 W. Main Street in Baldwin.

In December 2025, Civic Media expanded the St. Croix Country format when WLAK 1260 AM and translator W298DK 107.5 FM in Amery began simulcasting WSCM.
