= WGKB =

Radio station in Waukesha, Wisconsin

- Waukesha, Wisconsin; United States
- Broadcast area: Greater Milwaukee
- Frequency: 1510 kHz
- Branding: 101.7 The Truth

Programming
- Format: Black talk radio

Ownership
- Owner: Good Karma Sports; (Good Karma Broadcasting, LLC)
- Sister stations: WKTI; WTMJ

History
- First air date: March 27, 1947; 79 years ago (as WAUX)
- Former call signs: WAUX (1947–1965); WAUK (1965–2008); WRRD (2008–2020)
- Call sign meaning: Good Karma Brands (the parent company's previous name)

Technical information
- Licensing authority: FCC
- Facility ID: 70771
- Class: D
- Power: 250 watts days only
- Transmitter coordinates: 43.017790°N 88.195648°W
- Translator: 101.7 W269DL (Milwaukee)

Links
- Public license information: Public file; LMS
- Webcast: Listen live
- Website: goodkarmabrands.com/101-7-the-truth/

WGKB (1510 kHz) is a commercial AM radio station licensed to Waukesha, Wisconsin, United States, and serving the Greater Milwaukee media market. It is owned by Good Karma Sports, broadcasting a talk radio format aimed at Milwaukee's African American community. Along with sister stations WTMJ and WKTI, WGKB has its studios in the downtown 3rd Street Market Hall. WGKB features local hosts with live programs on weekdays from 7 a.m. to 6 p.m. The schedule is repeated at night and on weekends.

WGKB is a daytimer station. It is powered at 250 watts, using a non-directional antenna. AM 1510 is a clear channel frequency reserved for WLAC in Nashville, so WGKB must go off the air at night to avoid interference. The transmitter is on Coral Drive near Les Paul Highway (U.S. Route 18) in Waukesha. Programming is heard around the clock on 250-watt FM translator W269DL at 101.7 MHz, which transmits from the WITI TV Tower in Shorewood.

== History ==
=== WAUX and WAUK ===
The station signed on the air on March 27, 1947. Its original call sign was WAUX, owned by the Waukesha Broadcasting Company. Its studios were at 319 West Main Street and its General Manager was Carl Taylor. Through the years, 1510 AM has had a series of formats, including variations of adult contemporary, country music and talk.

In 1962, it added a sister station, WAUX-FM at 106.1 MHz. The two stations largely simulcast their programming in the early years. In 1965, they made a slight change in their call letters, becoming WAUK-AM-FM. In the 1970s, WAUK-FM began airing beautiful music. In the 1980s, it featured a comedy-only format and billed itself as "K-15: Your Comedy Connection." Today it is country music outlet WMIL-FM, owned by iHeartMedia.

=== Sports radio ===
WAUK switched to sports radio programming in October 1994 and was the home of ESPN Radio in Milwaukee. Because 1510 is a daytimer station, it could not air sporting events at night. As a result, the station leased time from WMCS (1290 AM) to carry the full ESPN Radio schedule between 6 p.m. and 6 a.m. for several years. That arrangement ended after Good Karma Broadcasting moved the WAUK sports format to its new, full-time frequency of 540 kHz, the former home of Christian radio outlet WRRD, owned by Salem Media.

For a while, 1510 WRRD became the replacement station for the religious programming formerly heard on 540 AM. That later ended and WRRD became a second-tier sports outlet for WAUK. Sporting events and ESPN programming that could not air on WAUK due to schedule conflicts were heard on WRRD.

=== Deportes and progressive talk ===
Logo as an ESPN Deportes Radio affiliate

On May 2, 2008, WRRD switched from English-language sports radio to be a network affiliate of ESPN Deportes Radio, a Spanish-language sports talk and play-by-play network.

On January 31, 2017, a group known as "The Devil's Advocates Radio" announced plans to purchase WRRD and to change the format to progressive talk, branded as "News Talk 1510" and as "WRRD Resistance Radio". The format change was implemented February 1 of that year.

Good Karma Broadcasting sold WRRD to "New WRRD, LLC", effective June 1, 2017, for $760,000. On November 13, 2019, WRRD rebranded as "Talk 101.7" with the sign-on of W269DL 101.7 FM, which also allows the station to carry a full-day schedule, even after sunset.

=== Signal downgrade ===
For several years, despite being a daytimer, WRRD was a high-power station, running 23,000 watts. With the shift in emphasis to 101.7 FM, WRRD applied to the FCC for a downgrade to its AM signal to 250 watts non-directional. The application was made on August 19, 2020, shortly after putting the dormant Waukesha studio facility and transmitter site up for sale. The station dropped most local programming in August 2020, resulting in a near-simulcast of sister station WTTN.

On August 31, 2020, WRRD reverted to sports as a simulcast of former sister station WAUK. The station's social media referred listeners to WTTN and its streaming presences with the shuttering of Crute's main studio facility on Brady Street in Milwaukee. On September 4, Good Karma Brands announced the acquisition of the W269DL translator, along with the re-acquisition of WRRD. This came as former owner Michael Crute negotiated with Good Karma to trade the stations, while strengthening its Madison presence.

=== Black talk ===
On September 29, 2020, Good Karma announced that WRRD would become a talk radio station focused on the city's African American community, branded as "101.7 The Truth". The translator station, W269DL, continued to utilize the 1510 AM transmitter as a signal source. It is the first full-time Black talk station in the market in seven years, after WNOV converted to a music format under new ownership, while WMCS (now WZTI) converted to oldies. WGKB's black talk format was also a local response to iHeartMedia's Black Information Network, which has not yet launched in Milwaukee. Its call sign was changed to WGKB on December 2, 2020.

The new format launched on January 4, 2021, utilizing a live 7 a.m.–6 p.m. schedule of four programs that repeat at night, albeit exclusively over W269DL after WGKB's dusk sign-off. The acquisition of WGKB and translator W269DL by Good Karma Brands (now Good Karma Sports as of August 2026) was consummated on April 30, 2021.

== Translator ==
Call sign	Frequency	City of license	FID	ERP (W)	Class	Transmitter coordinates	FCC info
W269DL	101.7 FM	Milwaukee, Wisconsin	201521	250	D	43°5′46.2″N 87°54′15″W	LMS
