= WJMS =

Radio station in Ironwood, Michigan

Coordinates: 46°25′27.8″N 90°12′33.6″W

- Ironwood, Michigan; United States
- Broadcast area: (Daytime) (Nighttime)
- Frequency: 590 kHz
- Branding: 590 & 92.3 WJMS

Programming
- Format: Classic country; talk
- Affiliations: NBC News Radio; Milwaukee Brewers Radio Network

Ownership
- Owner: Civic Media, Inc.
- Sister stations: WIMI; WKMJ-FM; WMPL; WUPY

History
- First air date: November 3, 1931

Technical information
- Licensing authority: FCC
- Facility ID: 57223
- Class: B
- Power: 5,000 watts (day); 113 watts (night)
- Translator: 92.3 W221EH (Ironwood)

Links
- Public license information: Public file; LMS
- Webcast: Listen live
- Website: www.wjmsam.com

WJMS (590 AM, "590 & 92.3 WJMS") is a radio station broadcasting a full-service format of classic country music and talk. Licensed to Ironwood, Michigan, it first began broadcasting November 3, 1931, with 100 watts of power. It was called "The Voice of the Iron Range".

== Sources ==
- Michiguide.com - WJMS History (archive.org 2013)
