= WJJQ =

WJJQ and WJJQ-FM
Tomahawk, Wisconsin; United States
- Frequencies: WJJQ: 810 kHz; WJJQ-FM: 92.5 MHz
- Branding: Northwoods 92.5

Programming
- Format: WJJQ: Sports; WJJQ-FM: Adult contemporary/Country
- Affiliations: Infinity Sports Network

Ownership
- Owner: Albert Broadcasting II, Inc

History
- First air date: WJJQ: August 1968; WJJQ-FM: October 15, 1984
- Former call signs: WJJQ: WELF (1968–1973); WYYS (1973–1978); WJJQ-FM: WRJQ (1983–1985)

Technical information
- Licensing authority: FCC
- Facility ID: WJJQ: 25346; WJJQ-FM: 14981
- Class: WJJQ: D; WJJQ-FM: C2
- Power: WJJQ: 980 watts (day); 13 watts (night)
- ERP: WJJQ-FM: 19,000 watts
- HAAT: WJJQ-FM: 136 meters (446 ft)
- Transmitter coordinates: WJJQ: 45°29′27″N 89°43′36″W
- Translator(s): WJJQ: 100.7 W264CH (Tomahawk)

Links
- Public license information: WJJQ: Public file; LMS; WJJQ-FM: Public file; LMS
- Webcast: Listen live
- Website: www.wjjq.com

WJJQ and WJJQ-FM are a pair of full-service radio stations in Tomahawk, Wisconsin. They are owned by Albert Broadcasting, Inc. The company's FM service broadcasts a mixed adult contemporary and country music format, and the AM station airs a sports format and is a CBS Sports Radio affiliate. The company is a family-owned community radio station. Their slogan is: "Your information and entertainment station of the northwoods." It is a 25,000 watt station that broadcasts at 92.5 MHz. It uses the nickname "The Big Q." WJJQ (AM) previously used the call letters WYYS, and before that, WELF in the early 1970s.
