= WZBU =

Radio station in New Holstein, Wisconsin

Simulcasts WISS Berlin
- New Holstein, Wisconsin; United States
- Broadcast area: Calumet County; Fox Cities
- Frequency: 1520 kHz
- Branding: WISS 96.5 / 98.3 FM - 1100 AM

Programming
- Language: English
- Format: Progressive talk
- Affiliations: ABC News Radio; Milwaukee Brewers Radio Network

Ownership
- Owner: Civic Media; (Civic Media, Inc.)
- Sister stations: WGBW; WISS

History
- First air date: 1982
- Former call signs: WMBE (1982–2012); WLWB (2012–2015); WLAK (2015–2023); WVXN (2023)
- Former frequencies: 1530 kHz (1982–2021)

Technical information
- Licensing authority: FCC
- Facility ID: 6649
- Class: D
- Power: 550 watts (day)
- Transmitter coordinates: 44°4′26″N 88°10′47.4″W
- Translator: 96.5 W243ER (New Holstein)

Links
- Public license information: Public file; LMS
- Website: wiss.fm

WZBU (1520 AM) is a daytime-only radio station licensed to the Calumet County community of New Holstein, Wisconsin, the station serves the Appleton-Oshkosh area, located to the northwest of Chilton. The station is owned by Civic Media.

In October 2012, the then-WLWB was granted a U.S. Federal Communications Commission (FCC) construction permit to move to a new transmitter site and increase power to 350 watts for daytime broadcasting only. Construction was completed in late July 2013.

== History ==
Just prior to its sale, WMBE was rented by Mountain Dog Media, a company owned by former State Senator Randy Hopper. It was operated as a sister station to Sheboygan's WCLB/950, and aside from engineering staff and remote broadcasts, all office and broadcasting operations were maintained out of the studios of sister stations WFON & KFIZ in Fond du Lac.

From sign-on, the station acted as ESPN Radio's Fox Cities affiliate until March 2011, when it and WCLB were dropped by ESPN Radio due to Mountain Dog's refusal to pay branding and licensing fees as requested by the network, and carry the network's afternoon programming. The station was rebranded as 1530, The Game and became an affiliate of Fox Sports Radio.

On June 1, 2011, DX-midAMerica reported that WMBE had changed to a new format, classic country. On October 25, 2011, the FCC's Public Notice showed the station was to be sold to Metro North Communications, Incorporated for $60,000 cash.

The station was recalled as WLWB on January 3, 2012, calls that had been used by Chilton-licensed WXMM (92.9) before the sale of that station from Metro North to Woodward Communications in July 2011. On January 10, 2012, the original tower at the corner of Park Rd. and MB Lane south of Chilton was taken down and the station was taken silent while a new site was located and approved. The new tower northwest of Chilton was activated to better serve the Fox Cities and Green Bay in August 2013. The station carried a regional Mexican format, provided by Luis Bello under a time brokerage agreement. The agreement with Bello was terminated by the parties, mutually, on December 2, 2013, and an automated oldies format filled the interim period.

After a period of time where the station was dark due to damage to their transmitter grounding system, WLWB returned to the air on December 18, 2014, as a daytime-only simulcast of Two Rivers-licensed sister station WEMP (98.9), which carries an easy listening/soft oldies format.

On August 6, 2015, WLWB went silent, as WEMP had been sold to Seehafer Communications, leaving the station without a programming source. On October 14, 2015, WLWB changed their call letters to WLAK.

On March 13, 2016, WLAK returned to the air with oldies, branded as "True Oldies 1530". On November 29, 2016, WLAK went silent.

On July 1, 2017, WLAK returned to the air with oldies, branded as "True Oldies 1530".

On October 20, 2021, WLAK changed frequency from 1530 kHz to 1520 kHz, increased daytime power from 350 watts to 550 watts, and rebranded as "True Oldies 1520".

On September 23, 2022, it was announced that Civic Media would acquire WLAK and translator W230DA from Metro North Communications, Inc. The sale was consummated on January 17, 2023. On January 23, 2023, the new owners changed the station's call sign to WVXN. Civic Media then applied to the FCC to take the station silent on April 20, 2023.

On November 6, 2023, the station changed its call sign to WZBU.

As of June 26, 2026 Civic Media took WZBU and it's translator off the air and applied for a remain silent authority from the Federal Communications Commission.
