= WAUH =

Radio station in Wautoma, Wisconsin

- Wautoma, Wisconsin; United States
- Frequency: 102.3 MHz
- Branding: 102.3 the Bug

Programming
- Format: Classic hits
- Affiliations: Compass Media Networks; Packers Radio Network

Ownership
- Owner: Civic Media, Inc.
- Sister stations: WRPN

History
- First air date: December 2002

Technical information
- Licensing authority: FCC
- Facility ID: 87540
- Class: A
- ERP: 5,300 watts
- HAAT: 106.4 meters (349.1 ft)
- Transmitter coordinates: 44°1′53.9″N 89°9′7.4″W

Links
- Public license information: Public file; LMS
- Webcast: Listen live
- Website: www.thebug.fm

WAUH (102.3 FM) is a radio station broadcasting a classic hits format. Licensed to Wautoma, Wisconsin, United States, the station is currently owned by Civic Media. The transmitter is located west of Redgranite.

The station carries play-by-play coverage for the Green Bay Packers Radio Network and Compass Media Networks. WAUH also features coverage of local high school sports.

== History ==
WAUH was built by the local Boyson family in Wautoma early in the year 2000. The station was originally operated under a low-power license until approximately mid-2001, when it increased its power to its current 5,300 watts. It was locally owned and operated by Hometown Broadcasting for many years. WAUH previously simulcast its programming with AM sister station WISS (1100 AM) in Berlin, Wisconsin, as part of the "Classic Hits" format. This simulcast arrangement ended when WISS was acquired by Civic Media in 2022 and that station subsequently switched to a progressive news/talk format. WAUH was sold to Civic Media in April 2025.

Civic Media stated its intent to retain the station's existing team and integrate local reporting into its statewide news operation.

Logo while simulcasting with WISS
