= WNOV =

Radio station in Milwaukee

- Milwaukee, Wisconsin; United States
- Broadcast area: Milwaukee metropolitan area
- Frequency: 860 kHz
- Branding: 106.5 & 860 WNOV

Programming
- Format: Urban contemporary

Ownership
- Owner: Civic Media, Inc.

History
- First air date: August 15, 1946 (as WFOX)
- Former call signs: WFOX (1946–1967)
- Call sign meaning: "Voice of the Nation" in reverse (former sister station to Chicago's WVON); "Wisconsin Negroes’ Own Voice"

Technical information
- Licensing authority: FCC
- Facility ID: 36069
- Class: D
- Power: 250 watts day; 5 watts night
- Transmitter coordinates: 43°4′20.04″N 87°57′7.31″W
- Translator: 106.5 W293CX (Milwaukee)

Links
- Public license information: Public file; LMS
- Webcast: Listen live
- Website: wnov860.com

WNOV (860 AM) is a commercial radio station in Milwaukee, Wisconsin, United States. It airs an urban contemporary radio format, with some weekday talk shows and urban gospel music on Sundays. The station is owned by Civic Media. The studios of WNOV are located on W. Capitol Drive in Milwaukee.

By day, WNOV transmits 250 watts non-directional. As 860 AM is a clear channel frequency reserved for Class A station CJBC in Toronto, to avoid interference, WNOV reduces power at night to only 5 watts. Through the day, it uses 500 watts. The transmitter is on West Locust Street at West Fond du Lac Avenue in Milwaukee. Programming is also heard on 99-watt FM translator W293CX at 106.5 MHz.

== History ==
=== WFOX ===
The station signed on the air on August 15, 1946, as WFOX. The station was a daytimer, required to go off the air at night. It was owned by the Wisconsin Broadcasting System with studios on East Wisconsin Avenue. In the early 1960s, WFOX aired a country music format.

=== WNOV ===
The station became WNOV in 1967 and began targeting the Milwaukee African-American community. WNOV aired a variety of African-American-oriented programming, ranging from rhythm and blues, urban gospel, hip-hop music and community affairs shows. In the past, WNOV was notable for several controversial local talk show hosts, particularly Michael McGee Sr. (former Milwaukee alderman).

In 2008, WNOV shifted to an urban adult contemporary sound. In recent years, it moved back to a broader urban contemporary direction to more effectively compete with WKKV, resulting in WNOV being placed on Mediabase's Urban reporting panel. WNOV is the only station owned by Courier Communications, but on January 18, 2008, it was leased to a new company called Radio Multi-Media, which took over operations.

In December 2025, it was announced that Courier Communications would sell the station to Civic Media alongside the Milwaukee Courier newspaper for $1.4 million. The sale was completed on August 4, 2026.

=== First FM translator ===
In December 2009, WNOV acquired a low-powered translator at 102.5 FM and launched its urban AC simulcast on the signal. The translator was licensed to the North Shore suburb of Mequon, but transmits from the WNOV transmitter site. The station used the FM dial position, calling itself "Majic 102.5". In 2011, the simulcast shifted to mainstream urban.

In 2010, WNOV filed a request with the FCC to relocate the signal to 93.9 FM and the AM/FM combined operating license (COL) to Milwaukee as a way to better serve the area. This is due to interference from WNWC-FM in Madison, which also broadcasts at 102.5. The station also changed its slogan to "102.5 The Beat" after Clear Channel Communications issued a cease and desist order over the use of the "Majic" moniker. (Clear Channel claims a copyright on radio station use of "magic" or a variation of the spelling.)

=== Off the air ===
On January 24, 2012, WNOV and W273AT both went dark. Courier Communications filed a request for special temporary authority (STA) with the FCC, to remain off the air temporarily. The station's owner and management company, Courier Communications and Radio Multi-Media, entered litigation, due to ongoing disputes and removal of station equipment.

Although Courier announced plans to return WNOV to the airwaves once replacement equipment was in place, the company filed another STA on March 29, 2012, which would leave the station off the air until March 2013. If the station did not return to air before then or the litigation is not resolved, the license could be returned to the FCC and WNOV could be deleted from the FCC's files. (The station's license was due to expire on December 31, 2012, another reason the STA was requested.) In May 2012, WNOV resumed broadcasting but it was not clear whether the return was only temporary. This move may be due to Radio Multi-Media's bankruptcy, which resulted in WWPW in Louisville being taken off the air after it failed to make payments to WAY-FM, which owned WWPW's transmitting equipment.

In the summer of 2012, WNOV, minus the FM translator (which was deleted from the FCC database), returned to the airwaves. It had a new moniker and new format. The station began using the slogan "The New WNOV". It started airing an urban contemporary format. Weekday programs on the station included The Rickey Smiley Morning Show and The Forum with Sherwin Hughes in late morning. Weekend programs includes urban gospel on Saturday mornings and all day Sunday with Rev. Charles Green, the Baka Boyz syndicated program, the Blues Lounge with Devo, "G Jams" with Ernie G, and a local Saturday evening reggae show The station runs automated at other times. The station was rebranded as "860 WNOV, The Voice" in fall 2013.

=== Second FM translator ===
WNOV put a new FM translator on the air in March 2017. It broadcasts on 106.5 FM. W293CX was moved from Park Falls, Wisconsin, during the FCC's AM revitalization transmission window. WNOV paid $30,000 to radio station WRVM to acquire the translator.

The translator's signal covers the core of Milwaukee. However, in some parts of the region, it must accept interference from WHBZ in Sheboygan, also on 106.5 FM.

Call sign	Frequency	City of license	FID	ERP (W)	Class	Transmitter coordinates	FCC info
W293CX	106.5 FM	Milwaukee, Wisconsin	155072	99	D	43°4′19″N 87°57′7″W	LMS

=== Past personalities ===
Noted disc jockeys have passed through the halls of WNOV over the years, including Bobby O'Jay, Jim Frazier, Michael Hightower, Earl Stokes, Ernie G, and Larry K. Myles. Others behind the WNOV microphone over the years included Maestro, Steve Hegwood, (later top executive at Radio One and himself an owner/operator of several radio stations), Jerry Smokin' B (who moved onto programming and afternoon drive at such stations as V103 Atlanta), Kevin Stone (Afternoon's at KJMZ and K104 Dallas, Morning's KHYS 98.5 Houston, Afternoon's WHRK Memphis, Producer of Brian McKnight Christmas Specials, National talent ABC Radio Networks) "The Real Deal" Mike Neil (mornings KYOK Houston, afternoons at B94 and 104.7 The Beat WJJJ Pittsburgh and KALC Denver) and Reggie Brown (a.k.a. Reg UJ, later Afternoons at WGCI Chicago and eventually back in Milwaukee at V100 100.7 FM).

Other notables Rockman Jr, Homer Blow, Rob Hardy, Tony Neal (Founder/CEO of the Core DJ's, The Largest DJ organization in the world), and Brother Eugene Matthews all called "The Incredible AM" 860 home at one time.

At one time WNOV ran "The Rickey Smiley Morning Show", "The Lady Pink Show" and "The Michael Baisden Show". Swiss Money Live Entertainment was a local weekday show on WNOV airing Thursday and Friday nights. Weekend programming included "Old School Reunion with Wayne the Magic Man" and "The Weekend Rollcall" with DJ Mike Mill on Saturdays and "Praise Mixdown", "New Pitts Gospel Hour" with Michelle Pitts and "SD Cooper Law Program" on Sundays.

=== Controversy ===
On May 3, 2007, on his morning show, Michael McGee, Sr. praised the death of the mother of another radio personality, WTMJ's Charlie Sykes, whom McGee was a timeslot rival of for years, with both hosts often referring to each other in negative terms. Sykes' mother, Katherine B. Sykes, died in a house fire from smoke inhalation two days before the comments were made. He stated that her death was "the vengeance of God" and insinuated that Sykes played a role in the death of his mother. On May 5, 2007, the station announced that the show, which was broadcast under a brokered programming agreement where McGee paid for his daily air time, would be hosted instead by McGee's son, then-current Milwaukee alderman Michael McGee, Jr., while the elder McGee was on "indefinite" suspension.

Three weeks later on May 28, 2007, McGee, Jr. was arrested and jailed on federal charges of bribery and extortion and local charges of attempted assault and solicitation for murder. After being found guilty of nine charges in June 2008, Michael McGee Jr. was sentenced to 6 1/2 years in prison by U.S. District Judge Charles Clevert. He served his term and was released at the end of 2015.
