= WHSM-FM =

Radio station in Hayward, Wisconsin

- Hayward, Wisconsin; United States
- Frequency: 101.1 MHz
- Branding: Musky 101

Programming
- Format: Country

Ownership
- Owner: Civic Media
- Sister stations: WBZH

History
- First air date: 1980 (at 101.7)
- Former frequencies: 101.7 MHz (1980-1995)

Technical information
- Licensing authority: FCC
- Facility ID: 53995
- Class: A
- ERP: 1,500 watts
- HAAT: 126 meters (413 ft)
- Transmitter coordinates: 45°59′07″N 91°32′23″W

Links
- Public license information: Public file; LMS

WHSM-FM (101.1 MHz, "Musky 101") is a radio station licensed to serve Hayward, Wisconsin, United States. The station is owned by Civic Media.

WHSM-FM broadcasts a country music format. Its studios and transmitter are located at 16880 W. Highway 63, west of downtown Hayward.

== History ==
WHSM-FM was established as the FM companion to WHSM (910 AM) in Hayward, Wisconsin. The station was originally licensed on 101.7 MHz. In January 1983, Broadcasting reported that WHSM-AM-FM had been sold by Inland Communications Corp. to Windsor Communications Inc. for $300,000. At the time of the report, WHSM-FM operated on 101.7 MHz with 3,000 watts and an antenna height of 466 feet above average terrain.

While licensed to Windsor Communications, WHSM-FM was involved in a Federal Communications Commission forfeiture proceeding in 1988. An industry report stated that the FCC upheld a $5,000 fine against Windsor for airing bingo advertisements for games sponsored by the Lac Courte Oreilles Tribal Government.

By 1994, WHSM-FM had moved into a satellite-fed oldies format. The M Street Journal reported in May 1994 that WHSM-FM, then adult contemporary, had added Unistar oldies programming, with WHSM 910 simulcasting the FM. FMedia! reported that year that Alan Quarnstrom, of Cloquet, Minnesota, owned WHSM-FM after buying the station in a bankruptcy sale, and that the station was carrying Transtar's The Oldies Channel full-time.

In 1995, WHSM-FM moved from 101.7 to 101.1 MHz. FMedia! reported that the move took place June 14, with the station operating at 1,500 watts horizontal and vertical polarization and a height above average terrain of 126 meters. By March 1997, the station had changed from Westwood One's oldies service to Westwood One adult contemporary programming and was using the name "Magic 101".

In 2006, Alan and Linda Quarnstrom agreed to sell nine of their fourteen radio stations to Red Rock Radio for $7.5 million. The sale included WHSM and WHSM-FM in Hayward, along with stations in Aitkin, Crosby, International Falls, Balsam Lake and Siren. The FCC granted the assignment of WHSM-FM's license, Facility ID 53995, from QB Broadcasting, Ltd. to Red Rock Radio Corp. on July 18, 2006.

Red Rock later sold WHSM-FM and several other northwestern Wisconsin stations to Zoe Communications, Inc. The FCC accepted the assignment application for WHSM-FM in July 2016 and granted the assignment in September 2016. After Zoe's purchase, NorthPine reported that WHSM-FM continued its country format as "Muskie 101", but that the programming became locally originated rather than satellite-fed.

On September 7, 2024, Zoe Communications moved its classic hits format "The Cabin" to WHSM-FM's 101.1 signal. The format had previously aired on WHSM-FM's HD2 channel and translator W245CT (96.9 FM) in Hayward. The change replaced "Muskie Country" on WHSM-FM, while the station retained the WHSM-FM call sign.

The classic hits format on WHSM-FM was short-lived. In November 2024, Zoe agreed to sell WHSM-FM and W245CT to Civic Media for $360,000. NorthPine reported that the deal included the WHSM-FM transmitter site and that Civic began operating the stations through a time brokerage agreement, returning WHSM-FM to its previous "Muskie Country" format. Barrett Media also reported that the station had discontinued "101.1 The Cabin" after about two months and returned to its country format as "Musky 101".

Civic Media announced in 2025 that it had received FCC approval to acquire WHSM, 101.1 FM, in Hayward. The company said it had brought back the "Musky 101" name and returned the station to a country format with local information, local personalities and human voices. Civic described WHSM-FM as its second Hayward station, after WBZH 910 AM and 96.9 FM.
