= WLCX (AM) =

Radio station in La Crosse, Wisconsin

- La Crosse, Wisconsin; United States
- Broadcast area: La Crosse County
- Frequency: 1490 kHz
- Branding: The Eagle 1490

Programming
- Language: English
- Format: Progressive talk
- Affiliations: ABC News Radio

Ownership
- Owner: Civic Media; (Civic Media, Inc.)

History
- First air date: 1947; 79 years ago
- Former call signs: WLCX (1947–1956); WLDL (1956–1957); WLCX (1957–1983); WLXR (1983–1988); WLFN (1988–2020); WLXR (2020–2023)

Technical information
- Licensing authority: FCC
- Facility ID: 7056
- Class: C
- Power: 1,000 watts (unlimited)
- Transmitter coordinates: 43°49′42.00″N 91°14′27.00″W

Links
- Public license information: Public file; LMS
- Website: lacrosseeagle.com

WLCX (1490 kHz) is an AM radio station broadcasting a progressive talk radio format. Licensed to La Crosse, Wisconsin, the station serves the La Crosse area. WLCX is currently owned by Sage Weil, through licensee Civic Media, Inc. WLCX broadcasts from studios on Fourth Street in Downtown La Crosse.

== History ==
On June 20, 1947, WLCX began broadcasting on 1490 kHz with 250 watts of power. On July 1, 1947, it became an ABC affiliate. The station was owned by Bermac Radio, Inc.

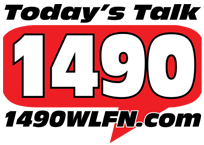
Logo as "Today's Talk 1400"

The station changed its call sign to WLDL on November 19, 1956, back to WLCX on April 21, 1957, and then to WLXR on July 7, 1983. On December 16, 1988, the station changed its call sign to WLFN, to reflect "Fun 1490" and the Oldies format. WLFN previously had an adult standards format and featured programming from CNN Radio and Dial Global's America's Best Music format. As an adult standards station, the station's programming switched to a holiday music format from Thanksgiving Day through Christmas. On July 1, 2012, WLFN switched formats from adult standards to talk, with the branding "Today's Talk 1490".

On July 31, 2020, Magnum Communications closed on the purchase of WLFN from Mississippi Valley Broadcasters, LLC, along with sister stations KQEG and WQCC, for $1.4 million. On August 1, 2020, WLFN changed its format back to oldies, branded as "Eagle 1490". The station changed its call sign back to WLXR on August 7.

On May 14, 2023, the station changed its call sign to WLCX. Two days later, Magnum Communications consummated the sale of WLCX, two sister stations, and four translators to Civic Media for $3.65 million. On June 5, 2023, the station dropped oldies for progressive talk.

As of June 26, 2026 Civic Media took WLCX off the air and applied for a remain silent authority from the Federal Communications Commission.
