= WSLD =

Whitewater, Wisconsin; United States
- Broadcast area: Walworth County, Wisconsin; Jefferson County, Wisconsin; Rock County, Wisconsin
- Frequency: 104.5 MHz
- Branding: 104.5 WSLD

Programming
- Format: Country music
- Affiliations: Premiere Radio Networks

Ownership
- Owner: Nora Karbash; (CMC Media LLC)

History
- First air date: November 16, 1992
- Call sign meaning: "State Long Distance"

Technical information
- Licensing authority: FCC
- Facility ID: 60612
- Class: A
- ERP: 6,000 watts
- HAAT: 100.0 meters (328.1 ft)
- Transmitter coordinates: 42°43′38.00″N 88°44′54.00″W

Links
- Public license information: Public file; LMS
- Website: www.1045wsld.com

WSLD (104.5 FM) is a radio station broadcasting a country music format. Licensed to Whitewater, Wisconsin, United States, the station serves Walworth, Jefferson and Rock counties. The station is owned by Nora Karbash, through licensee CMC Media LLC.
