= WEVR =

Radio station in River Falls, Wisconsin

WEVR and WEVR-FM
River Falls, Wisconsin; United States
- Frequencies: WEVR: 1550 kHz; WEVR-FM: 106.3 MHz

Programming
- Format: Adult contemporary
- Affiliations: USA Radio Network

Ownership
- Owner: Hanten Broadcasting Co. Inc.

History
- First air date: WEVR: September 14, 1969; WEVR-FM: September 30, 1970
- Call sign meaning: We are Variety Radio

Technical information
- Licensing authority: FCC
- Facility ID: WEVR: 25992; WEVR-FM: 25991
- Class: WEVR: D; WEVR-FM: A
- Power: WEVR: 920 watts (day); 4 watts (night)
- ERP: WEVR-FM: 6,000 watts
- HAAT: WEVR-FM: 100 meters (330 ft)
- Transmitter coordinates: WEVR: 44°53′19″N 92°39′2″W; WEVR-FM: 44°53′19″N 92°39′2″W

Links
- Public license information: WEVR: Public file; LMS; WEVR-FM: Public file; LMS
- Website: friendlyvalleyradio.com

WEVR (1550 AM) and WEVR-FM (106.3 FM) are radio stations simulcasting an adult contemporary format. Licensed to River Falls, Wisconsin, United States, the stations are owned by Hanten Broadcasting Co. Inc. They are an affiliate of the Wisconsin Badgers football, Green Bay Packers, and Milwaukee Brewers radio networks. The stations air select high school sporting events from local teams, with WEVR FM typically airing the games, but it will air overflow games when two overlap at the same time, mainly with Wisconsin Badgers football or the Green Bay Packers overlapping a select few Milwaukee Brewers and possibly some local high school sports regular season games or playoff games each year. WEVR carries local church broadcasts on Sundays, notably for St. Bridget Catholic Church and the First Congregational Church of River Falls. WEVR acts as the commercial home for University of Wisconsin–River Falls Falcon Athletics, specifically broadcasting NCAA Division III playoff games and regional tournaments that require a wider reach into the Twin Cities metropolitan fringe.

The transmitter tower for both WEVR AM and WEVR-FM is located in the Town of Troy, within St. Croix County, Wisconsin, just outside the city limits of River Falls.

The site is situated at 178 Radio Road, which also serves as the station's primary studio and business office.

== History ==
WEVR-AM was authorized to begin program operations on August 27, 1969. This coincided with the station's formal debut on September 14, 1969, as noted in the industry's annual records.

The FM sister station, WEVR-FM, followed shortly after, officially signing on the air on September 30, 1970. Both stations were founded by the Hanten family, with the corporate entity Hanten Broadcasting Company incorporated earlier that year to manage the growing local media presence in the Kinnickinnic Valley.

The highlight of many listeners each day was the "Time for trade" segment, a 10-minute community event and sale show showed hosted by the local hardware store owner, Fred Benson. He was the owner and operator of Lunds Hardware, a 104-year-old business before it closed in the early 2000s. Benson would mention all community events, offer local items for sale by responding to a phone call, and small engine repair advice by J. Fizz, a local expert on small engine & snowblower repairs, tips, and troubleshooting. J.Fizz's segments became so popular, the station considered offering J.Fizz his own half-hour show each Saturday morning however, J.Fizz had no interest in what he called, "big-time show business". J. Fizz would later go on and provide tips to public radio listeners through the local colleges' radio station WRFW 88.7 for four years before retiring. WEVR's “Suppertime Summary” starts around 5:00 p.m.; it wraps up information that happened during the day.
