= WTCH =

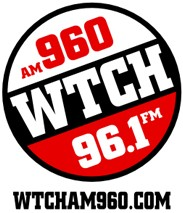
- Shawano, Wisconsin; United States
- Frequency: 960 kHz
- Branding: AM 960/96.1 FM

Programming
- Format: Classic Country
- Affiliations: Fox News Radio

Ownership
- Owner: Results Broadcasting Inc.

Technical information
- Licensing authority: FCC
- Facility ID: 72154
- Class: B
- Power: 1,000 watts
- Transmitter coordinates: 44°46′51.00″N 88°37′52.00″W

Links
- Public license information: Public file; LMS
- Webcast: Listen Live
- Website: wtcham960.com

WTCH (960 AM, "Moose Country AM 960") is a radio station broadcasting a classic country music format. Licensed to Shawano, Wisconsin, United States, the station is currently owned by Results Broadcasting Inc. and features programming from Fox News Radio.

WTCH Previous Logo
