= WQPC =

- Prairie du Chien, Wisconsin; United States
- Frequency: 94.3 MHz
- Branding: Q94 Great Country

Programming
- Format: Country
- Affiliations: ABC News Radio

Ownership
- Owner: Robinson Corporation

History
- Former call signs: WPRE-FM

Technical information
- Licensing authority: FCC
- Facility ID: 53302
- Class: C2
- ERP: 36,000 watts
- HAAT: 160.0 meters (524.9 ft)
- Transmitter coordinates: 43°3′35.00″N 91°6′2.00″W

Links
- Public license information: Public file; LMS
- Webcast: Listen live
- Website: wqpcradio.com

WQPC (94.3 FM, "Q94 Great Country") is a radio station broadcasting a country music format. Licensed to Prairie du Chien, Wisconsin, United States, the station is owned by Robinson Corporation and features programming from ABC News Radio.
