= WLAK (AM) =

Radio station in Amery, Wisconsin

- Amery, Wisconsin; United States
- Broadcast area: Rice Lake, Wisconsin
- Frequency: 1260 kHz
- Branding: 95.7 St. Croix Country

Programming
- Format: Country music
- Affiliations: Wisconsin Badgers

Ownership
- Owner: Civic Media; (Civic Media, Inc.)
- Sister stations: WBZH

History
- First air date: January 23, 1978
- Former call signs: WXCE (1976–2023)

Technical information
- Licensing authority: FCC
- Facility ID: 47079
- Class: B
- Power: 5,000 watts
- Transmitter coordinates: 45°15′25.00″N 92°22′0.00″W
- Translator: 107.5 W298DK (Amery)

Links
- Public license information: Public file; LMS
- Website: wscm.fm

WLAK (1260 kHz) is an AM radio radio station licensed to serve Amery, Wisconsin. The station is owned by Sage Weil, through licensee Civic Media, Inc.

WLAK has an FM translator on the frequency of 107.5 MHz.

== History ==
The station began as WXCE, a new AM facility licensed to Amery, Wisconsin. In June 1977, Broadcasting reported that the FCC had granted WXCE a construction-permit modification extending its completion deadline to December 31, 1977. The station signed on January 23, 1978.

WXCE changed hands several times during its first decades. In 1991, Monday Media Inc. applied to assign the license to Murray O. Ritland for $22,500. In 1999, the station was transferred from Johnson Towers Partnership to Lake Country Broadcasting Corporation.

In 2006, Johnson Broadcasting Corp. sold WXCE to Red Rock Radio Corp. for $325,000. At the time, the station was listed as a 5,000-watt news/talk outlet on 1260 kHz. By April 2009, WXCE had switched from Dial Global's Kool Gold service to Dial Global's adult standards format under Red Rock ownership.

Red Rock later sold WXCE and four other northwestern Wisconsin stations to Zoe Communications. The FCC accepted the assignment application in July 2016 and granted it in September 2016. After the Zoe acquisition, WXCE dropped NBC Sports Radio and returned to a 1960s-based oldies format, a format NorthPine noted the station had carried for much of the 2000s.

On April 28, 2020, WXCE began simulcasting Zoe's hard rock "Ink" format from WXNK in Shell Lake. The simulcast also used a new FM translator, W297CU on 107.3 MHz, which had been granted through the FCC's AM Revitalization filing window. In 2021, WXCE shifted again, this time to a relay of sister station WZEZ's light adult contemporary format; NorthPine reported that WXCE had briefly carried WXNK's hard rock format after dropping classic hits.

WXCE and W297CU went silent on November 11, 2021. Zoe told the FCC that it was exploring whether to remove several of WXCE's towers and operate non-directionally at reduced power; WXCE was then licensed for 5,000 watts day and night using separate directional patterns.

Civic Media agreed in 2022 to buy WXCE, W297CU, WSCM in Baldwin, and WBZH in Hayward from Zoe Communications for $700,000. Civic began operating WXCE and W297CU through a time brokerage agreement on September 2, 2022, and relaunched the station as "Lake Air Radio". WXCE and W297CU resumed operations on September 22, 2022, with WXCE using a 1,000-watt loaner transmitter under special temporary authority while awaiting a replacement for its licensed 5,000-watt transmitter. Civic closed on the purchase on December 29, 2022.

On January 29, 2023, WXCE changed call signs to WLAK, matching the "Lake Air" branding. The call letters had previously been used by a station in New Holstein, Wisconsin. Later in 2023, the translator moved from 107.3 to 107.5 MHz as W298DK and returned to the air from a new tower site between Amery and Balsam Lake.

In December 2025, Civic Media ended WLAK's news/talk programming and began simulcasting the country format of WSCM, branded as "St. Croix Country". Civic Media said the move expanded St. Croix Country's coverage into the Amery area and surrounding communities in Polk and Barron counties.

As of June 26, 2026, Civic Media took WLAK and its translator off the air and applied for a remain silent authority from the Federal Communications Commission.
