= WBZH =

Radio station in Hayward, Wisconsin

- Hayward, Wisconsin; United States
- Frequency: 910 kHz
- Branding: The Buzz

Programming
- Format: Progressive Talk
- Affiliations: ABC News Radio

Ownership
- Owner: Civic Media; (Civic Media, Inc.)
- Sister stations: WHSM-FM

History
- First air date: December 21, 1957
- Former call signs: WHSM (1957–2017); WCBN (2017–2022)
- Call sign meaning: "Buzz Hayward"

Technical information
- Licensing authority: FCC
- Facility ID: 53994
- Class: D
- Power: 5,000 watts (day); 75 watts (night)
- Transmitter coordinates: 45°59′07″N 91°32′23″W

Links
- Public license information: Public file; LMS
- Website: buzzofthenorth.com

WBZH (910 AM) is a radio station licensed to serve Hayward, Wisconsin. Established in 1957 as WHSM, the station is owned by Civic Media, Inc.

The station first began broadcasting on December 21, 1957, under the original call sign WHSM. It was established as a primary local service for Sawyer County, with its transmitter and studios located on West Highway 63. For its first sixty years, the station operated with various community-focused formats, including soft oldies and country music, often simulcasting with its FM sister station. Its studios and transmitter are located on W. Highway 63, west of downtown Hayward.

== History ==
The station now known as WBZH began as WHSM, an AM station on 910 kHz in Hayward, Wisconsin. Broadcasting reported in November 1957 that the Federal Communications Commission had assigned the WHSM call letters to WJMC Inc. for a new 910 kHz station in Hayward. A surviving station letter dated December 27, 1957, using WHSM letterhead and the slogan "The New Voice of Northwest Wisconsin", verified reception of "our new station" on December 20, 1957. The FCC granted WHSM's AM license on February 5, 1958.

WHSM was originally associated with WJMC Inc. of Rice Lake, Wisconsin. In October 1958, Broadcasting reported that WHSM, along with WJMC in Rice Lake, had joined the Mutual Broadcasting System roster. The 1964 Radio Annual listed WHSM as a 910 kHz, 1,000-watt daytime station owned by WJMC Inc., with studios on Route 3 in Hayward, MBS-KBS affiliation, W. C. Bridges as president, Russell J. Brown as general manager, B. L. Munson as station manager, and Robert P. Kolsky as chief engineer.

WHSM later pursued a major daytime power increase. In February 1959, Broadcasting reported that WHSM had applied for a construction permit to increase power from 1,000 watts to 5,000 watts, install a daytime directional antenna and new transmitter, and make ground-system changes. In April 1960, Broadcasting reported that the FCC had granted WHSM a change on 910 kHz from 1,000 watts daytime to 5,000 watts daytime directional, subject to engineering conditions. A 1968 technical listing showed WHSM operating with 5,000 watts daytime, and the 2001 National Radio Club AM Radio Log listed WHSM with 5,000 watts daytime and 75 watts nighttime from 16880 West Highway 63, carrying a nostalgia format with ABC and Jones Radio Networks and simulcasting on 101.1 FM as "Magic".

In September 1999, WHSM replaced a sports format with nostalgia programming from Jones Radio Networks. By 2014, WHSM-AM was part of Red Rock Radio's "Red Zone Sports Radio" group; the University of Minnesota Duluth announced that WHSM-AM 910 in Hayward and WCMP-AM 1350 in Pine City, Minnesota, were joining the Bulldog Sports Radio Network for UMD football and men's hockey broadcasts.

In 2016, Red Rock Radio Corp. agreed to assign WHSM and several other northwestern Wisconsin stations to Zoe Communications, Inc. The FCC accepted the WHSM assignment application for filing in July 2016 and granted the assignment on September 13, 2016. Radio & Television Business Report reported the sale as including WHSM-AM/FM in Hayward, WXCE in Amery, WLMX-FM in Balsam Lake, and WXCX-FM in Siren. After the sale, Zoe Communications acquired an FM translator for WHSM; NorthPine reported that W272DJ, then licensed to Ladysmith, would apply to move to Hayward on 96.9 MHz to relay WHSM under the FCC's AM revitalization translator window. At the time, WHSM had recently debuted a pop-hits format built around music from the 1960s through the 1980s.

Zoe later branded the AM station and its 96.9 FM translator as "The Cabin". NorthPine reported in 2020 that Zoe had first launched the "Cabin" branding in Hayward on W245CT/96.9 and WCBN/910 in early 2017, initially as adult contemporary and later as classic hits.

In September 2022, Civic Media agreed to purchase WCBN/910 from Zoe Communications as part of a multi-station northwestern Wisconsin acquisition. NorthPine reported that WCBN had recently gone silent after "The Cabin" classic hits format, heard on W245CT/96.9, was moved to the HD2 signal of WHSM-FM. A Sawyer County permit document dated October 25, 2022 stated that Civic Media had entered into an agreement with Zoe Communications to purchase "radio station WCBN-AM, now known as WBZH-AM" at 16880 US Highway 63 in Hayward, and noted that Zoe was retaining ownership of the land. NorthPine reported that WCBN changed its call sign to WBZH effective October 1, 2022, while the station was off the air pending Civic Media's purchase.

WBZH returned to the air on April 2, 2023. A 2023 National Radio Club DX News update listed WBZH as silent since August 7, 2022, when it was WCBN, and back on the air with special temporary authority on April 2. Civic Media's WBZH FAQ says the station returned on April 2, 2023 with its current news/talk format as "The Buzz", featuring Civic Media network programming.

In 2024, Civic Media moved to reunite WBZH with the 96.9 FM translator. NorthPine reported that Zoe Communications was selling WHSM-FM/101.1 and W245CT/96.9 in Hayward to Civic Media for $360,000; W245CT began relaying WBZH, reuniting the AM station and translator that had simulcast before the 2022 sale. Barrett Media also reported that Civic had acquired WHSM-FM and the 96.9 translator from Zoe, and that 96.9 was simulcasting the "Buzz of the North" programming from WBZH 910.

In March 2025, Civic Media announced the relaunch of WHSM-FM as "Musky 101" and described WBZH 96.9 FM and 910 AM as airing a Wisconsin-focused news and talk format. The same announcement said WBZH would carry Milwaukee Brewers spring-training and regular-season games. WBZH currently identifies as a Civic Media news/talk station serving Hayward and Sawyer County on 96.9 FM and 910 AM. Technical listings show WBZH as a class D AM facility on 910 kHz, facility ID 53994, using 5,000 watts daytime and 75 watts nighttime from a one-tower site west of Hayward.

As of June 26, 2026 Civic Media took WBZH and it's translator off the air and applied for a remain silent authority from the Federal Communications Commission.
