= Mass media in Rockford, Illinois =

This is a listing of the broadcasters and published media targeted at Rockford, Illinois.

== Radio ==
Start dates are for the frequency/station license, not for callsign or programming that may have moved from license to license.

=== FM ===
| Freq | Call | City | Owner | Start | ERP (W) | Nickname | Format | RDS | HD |
|---|---|---|---|---|---|---|---|---|---|
| 88.3 | WFEN | Rockford | Faith Academy | 1991 | 8,500 | The Lighthouse | Christian | Yes | No |
| 89.1 | WNIE | Freeport | Northern Illinois University | 1999 | 6,000 | WNIJ | Public/news/talk | No | No |
| 89.5 | WNIJ | DeKalb | Northern Illinois University | 1954 | 50,000 | WNIJ | Public/news/talk | Yes | Yes |
| 90.5 | WNIU | Rockford | Northern Illinois University | 1991 | 50,000 | WNIU | Classical | Yes | No |
| 91.1 | WILV | Loves Park | Educational Media Foundation | 1988 | 7,000 | K-LOVE | Christian AC | Yes^{[a&t]} | No |
| 91.7 | WZKL | Woodstock | Educational Media Foundation | 2010 | 6,500 | K-LOVE | Christian AC | Yes^{[a&t]} | No |
| 92.1 | WFPS | Freeport | Big Radio | November 1, 1970 | 3,600 | Kickin' Country K92 | Country | Yes | No |
| 92.5 | WCLR | DeKalb | Educational Media Foundation | 1961 | 20,000 | K-Love | Christian contemporary | Yes | No |
| 93.3 | WHJG-LP | Rockford | Pelley Road Christian Fellowship | 2005 | 100 | 93.3 WHJG | Christian | No | No |
| 93.7 | WBGR-FM | Monroe | Big Radio | 1959 | 36,000 | Big FM 93.7 | Oldies/News/Talk | Yes | No |
| 94.5 | W233AD | Rockford | Family Radio | | 38 | ^{[t]}91.9 WJCH | Christian | No | No |
| 94.9 | WDKB | DeKalb | Mid-West Family Broadcasting | 1990 | 3,000 | 94.9 WDKB | Hot AC | No | No |
| 95.3 | WRTB | Winnebago | Mid-West Family Broadcasting | 1967 | 1,250 | 95-3 The Bull | Country | Yes | No |
| 95.7 | WSEY | Oregon | NRG Media | 1999 | 3,200 | Sky 95.7 | Adult Contemporary | Yes | No |
| 96.7 | WKGL-FM | Loves Park | Townsquare Media | 1964 | 2,200 | 96.7 The Eagle | Classic Rock | Yes^{[a&t]} | No |
| 97.5 | WZOK | Rockford | Townsquare Media | 1949 | 50,000 | 97ZOK | CHR/Pop | Yes^{[a&t]} | No |
| 98.5 | WXXQ | Freeport | Townsquare Media | 1965 | 11,000 | Q98.5 | Country | Yes^{[a&t]} | No |
| 99.3 | WTPB-LP | Rockford | Third Presbyterian Church of Rockford | 2005 | 47 | | Variety | No | No |
| 99.9 | WJVL | Janesville | Southern Wisconsin Broadcasting | 1947 | 11,000 | 99.9 WJVL | Country | Yes^{[a&t]} | No |
| 100.5 | W263BJ | Loves Park | Mid-West Family Broadcasting | | 230 | ^{[t]}104.9 WXRX-HD2, 100 FM | Classic Hits | Yes | No |
| 100.9 | WQFL | Rockford | Educational Media Foundation | 1974 | 2,700 | Air 1 | Contemporary Christian | Yes^{[a&t]} | No |
| 102.3 | WYOT | Rochelle | Rochelle Broadcasting Company | October 5, 1973 | 6,000 | 102.3 The Coyote | Country | Yes^{[a&t]} | No |
| 103.1 | WGFB | Rockton | Mid-West Family Broadcasting | 1963 | 2,400 | B103 | Hot AC | Yes | No |
| 104.9 | WXRX | Belvidere | Mid-West Family Broadcasting | 1971 | 4,000 | 104-9 The X | Mainstream Rock | Yes | 3 |
| 105.7 | W289AB | Rockford | Northern Illinois University | | 55 | ^{[t]}90.5 WNIU | Classical | Yes | No |
| 106.3 | WYRB | Genoa | Crawford Broadcasting | 2001 | 3,800 | Power 106 | Rhythmic | Yes^{[a&t]} | Yes |
| 107.3 | WSJY | Fort Atkinson | NRG Media | 1959 | 26,000 | 107-3 WSJY | Adult Contemporary | Yes^{[a&t]} | No |

- ^[a&t] displays artist and title on Radio Data System
- ^[t] FM translator: repeats another station's program

=== AM ===
| Freq | Call | City | Owner | Start | Day Power (W) | Night Power | Nickname | Format | Stereo | HD |
|---|---|---|---|---|---|---|---|---|---|---|
| 1330 | WNTA | Rockford | Mid-West Family Broadcasting | 1953 | 1,000 | 91 | Sportsfan Radio | Sports | No | No |
| 1380 | WBEL | South Beloit | Big Radio | 1948 | 5,000 | 5,000 | The Beat | 90's | No | No |
| 1440 | WROK | Rockford | Townsquare Media | 1923 | 5,000 | 270 | News Talk 1440 WROK | News/Talk | No | No |
| 1490 | WGEZ | Beloit | Big Radio | 1948 | 1,000 | 1,000 | Iron Country | Traditional Country | No | No |
| 1520 | WLUV | Loves Park | VCY America | 1963 | 500 | 12.5 | Christian Information Radio | Christian | No | No |

== Television ==
| Virt. Ch. | Call | City | Owner | Operator | Start | Digital Ch. | DTV | Nickname | Programming |
|---|---|---|---|---|---|---|---|---|---|
| 13.1 | WREX | Rockford | Gray Media | | October 1, 1953 | 13 | 1080i | 13 WREX | NBC |
| 13.2 | WREX | Rockford | Gray Media | | October 1, 1953 | 13 | | MeTV Toons | MeTV Toons |
| 13.3 | WREX | Rockford | Gray Media | | October 1, 1953 | 13 | 480i | Rockford's MeTV | MeTV |
| 13.4 | WREX | Rockford | Gray Media | | October 1, 1953 | 13 | 480i | Court TV | Court TV |
| 13.5 | WREX | Rockford | Gray Media | | October 1, 1953 | 13 | 480i | True Crime Network | True Crime Network |
| 17.1 | WTVO | Rockford | Mission Broadcasting | Nexstar Media Group | May 3, 1953 | 16 | 720p | WTVO Channel 17 | ABC |
| 17.2 | WTVO | Rockford | Mission Broadcasting | Nexstar Media Group | May 3, 1953 | 16 | 720p | MyTV | MyNetworkTV |
| 17.3 | WTVO | Rockford | Mission Broadcasting | Nexstar Media Group | May 3, 1953 | 16 | 480i | Laff | Laff |
| 17.4 | WTVO | Rockford | Mission Broadcasting | Nexstar Media Group | May 3, 1953 | 16 | 480i | Grit | Grit |
| 23.1 | WIFR-LD | Rockford | Gray Television | | September 12, 1965 | 28 | 1080i | 23 WIFR | CBS |
| 23.2 | WIFR-LD | Rockford | Gray Television | | September 12, 1965 | 28 | 720p | Antenna TV | Antenna TV |
| 23.3 | WIFR-LD | Rockford | Gray Television | | September 12, 1965 | 28 | 480i | Circle TV | Circle (TV network) |
| 23.4 | WIFR-LD | Rockford | Gray Television | | September 12, 1965 | 28 | 480i | Ion | Ion Television |
| 23.5 | WIFR-LD | Rockford | Gray Television | | September 12, 1965 | 28 | 720p | Stateline CW | The CW |
| 23.10 | WREX | Rockford | Allen Media Broadcasting | | October 1, 1953 | 13 | 720p | WREXCBS | Simulcast of WIFR-LD |
| 23.11 | WFBN-LD | Rockford | Weigel Broadcasting | | March 16, 2007 | 35 | 1080i | 23 WIFR | Simulcast of WIFR-LD |
| 35.1 | WFBN-LD | Rockford | Weigel Broadcasting | | March 16, 2007 | 35 | 480i | H&I | Heroes & Icons |
| 35.2 | WFBN-LD | Rockford | Weigel Broadcasting | | March 16, 2007 | 35 | 480i | Telemundo Wisconsin | Simulcast of WYTU-LD |
| 39.1 | WQRF | Rockford | Nexstar Media Group | | November 27, 1978 | 36 | 720p | Fox 39 | Fox |
| 39.2 | WQRF | Rockford | Nexstar Media Group | | November 27, 1978 | 36 | 480i | Bounce Rockford | Bounce TV |
| 39.3 | WQRF | Rockford | Nexstar Media Group | | November 27, 1978 | 36 | 480i | Court TV Mystery | Court TV Mystery |
| 39.4 | WQRF | Rockford | Nexstar Media Group | | November 27, 1978 | 36 | 480i | Rewind | Rewind TV |
| 47.1 | WYCH-LD | Rockford | Hispanic Family Christian Network | | December 18, 2012 | 47 | 480i | | Multilingual |

Rockford is one of a few US markets with no PBS station of its own. PBS Wisconsin member station WHA-TV (UHF channel 20, virtual channel 21.1) in neighboring Madison and Chicago-based WTTW serve as the default member stations for the Rockford market via cable and satellite; the former station's over-the-air analog signal was viewable in portions of the Rockford area prior to the 2009 digital television transition.

== Print and digital media ==
The Rockford Register Star began publication in 1979 when the Register-Republic merged with the Morning Star.

Rockford was the original home of the monthly magazine Chronicles, which was founded in 1977.

Other current publications include the Community Bargain Hunter, a weekly advertising publication; and Northwest Quarterly, a lifestyle and business magazine covering northern Illinois and southern Wisconsin. The Rock River Times continued to carry legal notices for Rockford Township in 2026.

The digital news outlet Rock River Current launched in 2020 and is the news arm of Mid-West Family Northern Illinois.
