= WGEZ =

- Beloit, Wisconsin; United States
- Broadcast area: Janesville, Wisconsin
- Frequency: 1490 kHz
- Branding: Iron Country 101.9 and 1490

Programming
- Format: Classic country
- Affiliations: Westwood One

Ownership
- Owner: Scott Thompson; (Big Radio)
- Sister stations: WBEL, WWHG

History
- First air date: September 26, 1948

Technical information
- Licensing authority: FCC
- Facility ID: 24995
- Class: C
- Power: 1,000 watts (unlimited)
- Transmitter coordinates: 42°29′45″N 89°1′3″W
- Translator: See § Translator

Links
- Public license information: Public file; LMS
- Webcast: Listen live
- Website: www.ironcountry.fm

WGEZ (1490 AM; "Iron Country") is a radio station broadcasting a classic country music format. Licensed to Beloit, Wisconsin, United States, the station serves the Janesville area. The station is owned by Scott Thompson, through licensee Big Radio. WGEZ, features programming from Westwood One, Its programming is simulcast on translator station W270CW (101.9 FM).

== History ==
WGEZ began broadcasting September 26, 1948, on 1490 kHz with 100 watts of power (full-time). The station, a Mutual affiliate, was licensed to Beloit Broadcasting Company. In 2008, the station was affiliated with The True Oldies Channel. A purchase agreement, dated September 16, 2014, shows WGEZ being sold by Alliance Communications, Inc. to Big Radio, from Monroe, Wisconsin. Big Radio also owns WEKZ AM-FM, WFRL, WFPS, WQLF, WBEL, and WWHG. The sale to Big Radio, at a price of $150,000, was consummated on December 31, 2014. On August 3, 2016, WGEZ switched formata from oldies to classic country.

== Translator ==
Broadcast translator for WGEZ
| Call sign | Frequency | City of license | FID | ERP (W) | Class | Transmitter coordinates | FCC info |
|---|---|---|---|---|---|---|---|
| W270CW | 101.9 FM | Beloit, Wisconsin | 146906 | 250 | D | 42°27′34″N 89°1′43″W | LMS |
