= WFRL =

- Freeport, Illinois; United States
- Broadcast area: Stephenson County, Illinois
- Frequency: 1570 kHz
- Branding: Iron Country 104.3 and 1570

Programming
- Format: Classic country

Ownership
- Owner: Big Radio
- Sister stations: WFPS, WEKZ, WBGR-FM, WQLF, WGEZ, WBEL, WWHG

History
- First air date: October 28, 1947
- Call sign meaning: "What Freeport Really Likes"

Technical information
- Licensing authority: FCC
- Facility ID: 63135
- Class: B
- Power: 1,000 watts day; 210 watts night
- Transmitter coordinates: 42°18′45.07″N 89°35′40.42″W
- Translator: 104.3 W282CT (Freeport)

Links
- Public license information: Public file; LMS
- Webcast: Listen live
- Website: www.bigradio.fm

WFRL (1570 AM) is a radio station licensed to Freeport, Illinois. WFRL airs a classic country format and is owned by Big Radio. Its studios and transmitter are at 834 North Tower Road, northeast of Freeport.

The station features local news, plus farm and local high school sports programming. WFRL operates 24 hours a day, but at one time was licensed as a daytime only station. WFRL is also rebroadcast on translator station W282CT 104.3 FM in Freeport.

== History ==
WFRL began broadcasting October 28, 1947, on 1570 kHz, running 1,000 during daytime hours only. The station was licensed to Freeport Broadcasting Company, owned by Mr. and Mrs. Vincent S. Barker. Barker built the station's transmitter in his basement during World War II.

In 1959, the station was sold to Triad Television Corp for $275,000. In 1964, the station's power was increased to 5,000 watts. On April 11, 1965, its sister station, WFRL-FM, began broadcasting on 98.5. WFRL-FM is now WXXQ.

The station aired a country music format until June 1977 and flipped to a top 40 format with the change of ownership. In 1977, the station was sold to Bradford-Ross Associates, along with WFRL-FM, for $475,000. In 1980, the station was sold to Illinois Broadcasting, along with WXXQ, for $975,000. In 1980, the station had adopted a country music format. In 1983, the station was sold to a partnership of C.R. Griggs, James D. McQuality and Larry S. Ward. In 1985, the station was sold to Freeport Radio Associates, along with WXXQ, for $1 million.

By 1989, the station had adopted an adult contemporary format, and the station had begun nighttime operations, running 500 watts. In 1991, the station was sold to Stateline Broadcasting, along with WXXQ, for $900,000. In 1993, the station added talk programming. In 1995, the station was sold to Connoisseur Communications, along with WXXQ, for $2.3 million. By 1996, talk programming had replaced all music on the station. In 1996, the station was sold to Eveningstar Media Group for $245,000. The station temporarily simulcast 1440 WROK while the sale was pending.

Former logo

In 1998, the station adopted an adult standards format. In 2005, the station was sold to Maverick Media. In 2006, the station was sold to Green County Broadcasting, along with 92.1 WFPS, for $1,475,000. In 2010, the station was an affiliate of the short lived "Hit Parade Radio" oldies network, which featured DJs Larry Lujack and Wink Martindale. After the network's shutdown, WFRL retained the oldies format with local personalities. In 2017, WFRL switched to a classic country format.

WFRL was granted a modification in August 2022 to change its signal from directional to non-directional and reduce power to 1,000 watts daytime and 210 watts nighttime. This took effect as of August 2023.

== Translator ==
Call sign	Frequency	City of license	FID	ERP (W)	Class	Transmitter coordinates	FCC info
W282CT	104.3 FM	Freeport, Illinois	202101	250	D	42°18′46″N 89°35′36″W	LMS
