= WEKZ =

WEKZ may refer to:

- WEKZ (AM), a radio station (1260 AM) licensed to serve Monroe, Wisconsin, United States
- WBGR-FM, a radio station (93.7 FM) licensed to serve Monroe, Wisconsin, which held the call sign WEKZ-FM from 1959 to 2016
