= Milwaukee Bucks Radio Network =

Basketball related broadcasts radio network in Wisconsin and Michigan

- Type: Radio Network
- Branding: BMO Bucks Radio Network
- Country: United States
- Headquarters: Milwaukee, Wisconsin
- Broadcast area: Wisconsin (15 stations); Michigan (1 station)
- Owner: Milwaukee Bucks
- Affiliation: National Basketball Association
- Affiliates: 16
- Official website: BMO Bucks Radio Network

The Milwaukee Bucks Radio Network (branded as the BMO Bucks Radio Network) is a 16-station radio network in Wisconsin and Michigan that broadcasts basketball games and related programming for the Milwaukee Bucks of the National Basketball Association. Since the Bucks inaugural season, WTMJ/620 in Milwaukee, Wisconsin, has served as the flagship station for the network.

== Announcers ==
Former Dallas Mavericks broadcaster Ted Davis was part of the BMO Bucks Radio Network from 1997 to 2021. Dennis Krause, the sports director of Spectrum's local news channel Spectrum News 1, was part of the Bucks Radio Network from 1996 to 2021. Davis did play-by-play for every game, with Krause providing color commentary at home games.

After the 2021 NBA Finals, which ended with the Bucks' winning their first NBA Championship in 50 years, Davis announced his retirement in August 2021. Davis was replaced by David Koehn, who'd been the play-by-play broadcaster for the University of Virginia men's basketball team. Krause also left as the color commentator prior to the 2021-22 Bucks season for undisclosed reasons, and was replaced by Ben Brust, a former Wisconsin Badgers men's basketball player and analyst for the Big Ten Network.

== Programming ==
=== Pre-game ===
The pre-game show is Buck Shots.

=== Post-game ===
The post-game show is made up of two parts, the first half hour being the Radio.com Post Game Show, and the last hour being Bucks And-One (branded as Bucks And-One Presented by Noble Vines), which airs only on ESPN Milwaukee and ESPN Madison. Both parts are hosted by Justin Garcia.

== Stations ==

=== Affiliates (15 stations) ===
All radio streams are blacked out beyond their station's coverage area due to NBA streaming rules.

==== Wisconsin ====
City	Callsign	Frequency
Amery	WLAK	1260 AM
Amery	WLAK	107.3 FM
Appleton	WHBY	1150 AM
Appleton	WHBY	103.5/106.3 FM
Beaver Dam	WBEV-FM	95.3 FM
Eau Claire	WMEQ	880 AM
Eau Claire	WMEQ	106.3 FM
Fond du Lac	KFIZ	1450 AM
Fort Atkinson	WFAW	940 AM
Green Bay	WNFL	1440 AM
Green Bay	WNFL	101.9 FM
Janesville	WCLO	1230 AM
Janesville	WCLO	92.7 FM
La Crosse	WKTY	580 AM
La Crosse	WKTY	96.7 FM
Madison	WTLX	100.5 FM
Manitowoc	WOMT	1240 AM
**Milwaukee**	**WTMJ**	**620 AM**
Prairie du Chien	WPRE	980 AM
Prairie du Chien	WPRE	104.3 FM
Oshkosh	WISS	1100 AM
Oshkosh	WISS	98.3 FM
Park Falls	WCQM	98.3 FM
Racine	WRJN	1400 AM
Racine	WRJN	99.9 FM
Kenosha	WRJN	98.1 FM
Rice Lake	WJMC	1240 AM
Richland Center	WRCE	1450 AM
Richland Center	WRCE	107.7 FM
Waupaca	WDUX	92.7 FM
Wausau	WRIG	1390 AM
Wausau	WRIG	93.9 FM

Bold denotes the Flagship station.
