= Good Karma Sports =

American radio and sports marketing conglomerate

Good Karma Broadcasting, LLC
- Type: Private
- Industry: Radio broadcasting Sports marketing Retail
- Founded: August 20, 1997
- Founder: Craig Karmazin
- Headquarters: Milwaukee, Wisconsin, United States
- Area served: United States
- Website: goodkarmasports.com

Good Karma Broadcasting, LLC, doing business as Good Karma Sports (formerly Good Karma Brands) is an American conglomerate. Based in Milwaukee, Wisconsin, it has interests in sports marketing, radio broadcasting, retail, and real estate. Good Karma was founded in 1997 by Craig Karmazin, the son of former Viacom and SiriusXM executive Mel Karmazin. Craig remains the CEO of Good Karma to this day.

The company owns and/or operates radio stations in the states of California, Florida, Illinois, New York, Ohio, and Wisconsin. The majority of its radio stations are ESPN Radio affiliates, including its New York City, Los Angeles, and Chicago stations—which were sold by The Walt Disney Company to GKB in December 2021. In July 2023, GKB also assumed the day-to-day operations and advertising sales for ESPN Radio nationwide.

== History ==
The company was established in August 1997, and GKB would make its first acquisition of radio stations in December of that year with the purchase of stations in its home base of Beaver Dam (WBEV and WXRO) as well as in Columbus, Wisconsin (WTLX).

As time passed, GKB would also eventually purchase stations in Milwaukee, Wisconsin; Madison, Wisconsin; Cleveland, Ohio; and West Palm Beach, Florida, with the majority of these stations having a sports radio format with an ESPN Radio affiliation.

In 2006, GKB opened an interior design/furniture store in Milwaukee called The Home Market, and would later open a second location in Madison, Wisconsin.

In 2011, GKB began to purchase residential properties near Lambeau Field in Green Bay, Wisconsin. The buildings were collectively branded as the "Tundra Trio", and were renovated as upscale properties that can be rented for events.

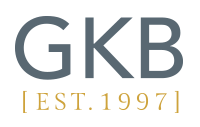
Good Karma Brands moniker used until August 2026

In 2013, GKB station WKNR ESPN 850 in Cleveland became the AM flagship station for the Cleveland Browns. That year, it also partnered with ESPN Events on the Boca Raton Bowl.

In January 2014, to reflect the company's expansion beyond radio, GKB officially changed its name from Good Karma Broadcasting to its name of Good Karma Brands.

On July 17, 2014, it was reported that GKB had purchased a minority ownership stake in the Milwaukee Bucks of the National Basketball Association (NBA).

On July 27, 2018, GKB announced it had reached a deal to acquire WTMJ and WKTI in Milwaukee from the E. W. Scripps Company. WKTI would flip to ESPN Radio.

On August 28, 2019, it was announced by ESPN Radio that day-to-day management of Chicago's WMVP would move from direct purview by ESPN to a management agreement with Good Karma Brands. The station's incumbent general manager, Jim Pastor, retired at the end of the year, with Good Karma beginning to operate the station on September 29, 2019, under a lease with Disney. The lease did not lead to any immediate changes to personnel and facilities. Two years later, on December 13, 2021, Good Karma announced it would acquire WMVP outright, as well as WEPN in New York City, and KSPN in Los Angeles. GKB also assumed Disney's local marketing agreement to operate Emmis Communications-owned WEPN-FM in New York City. GKB would pay $15 million for the stations, with $1 million paid at the deal's closing and the rest paid in quarterly installments of $500,000. The sale of WEPN was closed in March 2022.

On July 31, 2023, it was reported that ESPN had reached an agreement for Good Karma Brands to assume day-to-day operations and advertising sales for the ESPN Radio network and its podcasts under a revenue sharing agreement, which began July 28; ESPN will continue to remain responsible for the network's content and distribution. Karmazin considered it a culmination of the company's long-standing relationship with ESPN Radio, explaining that "we probably went against what anyone would recommend, but we have just gone all-in with one brand — a brand that we don't own. [...] We just believe so strongly in it. And we believe we complement what the Walt Disney Co. and ESPN does so well because we’re going to treasure their brand in the same way they do."

On August 12, 2024, GKB announced that it would enter into a local marketing agreement with Audacy, Inc. New York City station WCBS effective August 26, ending its long-standing all-news format and transitioning to the ESPN Radio programming previously heard on WEPN-FM. The agreement comes amid the conclusion of GKB's LMA with Emmis at the end of the month, which will not be renewed. Audacy retained control of its existing rights on the station (now WHSQ) for the New York Mets.

On February 3, 2026, GKB took over distribution of the Buffalo Bills Radio Network from Audacy, eventually contracting with Cumulus Media to carry the team on WGRF, along with the Sabres Hockey Network, both teams owned by Terry Pegula. A later announcement indicated that the Sabres network would not be managed by Good Karma and would remain under Audacy's oversight.

Good Karma and the Milwaukee Bucks announced on July 10, 2026, that GKB will distribute and handle ad sales and affiliate relations for its telecasts across a statewide over-the-air network and DTC service, to be led by Rincon's WVTV-DT2 in Milwaukee (channel 24 in Milwaukee, otherwise known as My 24), starting with that summer's Summer League games. The new network replaces the team's former arrangement with the now-defunct FanDuel Sports Network Wisconsin dating to the 1996–97 season, with occasional over-the-air telecasts on WMLW-TV (channel 49) and a statewide network over the last two seasons. Channel 24 had last carried Bucks telecasts in the 1993–94 season. GKB also has the same arrangement with Fox's WITI (channel 6) and the Milwaukee Brewers to distribute a Tuesday home game package in the 2025 and 2026 baseball seasons in a simulcast with MLB Local Media's Brewers.tv streaming service and pay-TV channel.

In August 2026, GKB changed its trade name to "Good Karma Sports", in order to emphasize its current focus on sports marketing and broadcasting.

== Assets ==
=== Current stations ===
List of radio stations owned by Good Karma Sports
Media market	State	Station	Format	Purchased	Notes
Los Angeles	California	KSPN	ESPN Radio	2021	
West Palm Beach	Florida	WEFL	TUDN Radio	2005	
West Palm Beach	Florida	WESP	ESPN Radio	2013	
Chicago	Illinois	WMVP	ESPN Radio	2019	
Cleveland	Ohio	WKNR	ESPN Radio	2006	
New York City	New York	WEPN	ESPN Radio	2021	
New York City	New York	WHSQ	ESPN Radio	2024	(Note: Owned by Audacy, Inc. and operated by Good Karma.)
Beaver Dam	Wisconsin	WBEV	ESPN Radio	1997	
Beaver Dam	Wisconsin	WBEV-FM	Oldies	1997	
Madison	Wisconsin	WTLX	ESPN Radio	1997	
Milwaukee	Wisconsin	WGKB	Black talk	2004	
Milwaukee	Wisconsin	WKTI	ESPN Radio	2018	
Milwaukee	Wisconsin	WTMJ	Talk and sports	2018	

=== Former stations ===
List of radio stations formerly owned by Good Karma Sports
Media market	State	Station	Purchased	Sold	Notes
Cleveland	Ohio	WWGK	2006	2021	(Note: License was cancelled under Good Karma ownership.)
Beloit–Janesville	Wisconsin	WTJK	2000	2014	
Beloit–Janesville	Wisconsin	WWHG	2000	2014	
Milwaukee	Wisconsin	WAUK	2008	2022	
Watertown	Wisconsin	WTTN	1999	2023	(Note: Moved to Columbus, Wisconsin, in 2009.)

=== Radio networks ===
- Buffalo Bills Radio Network
- Chicago Bears Radio Network
- Chicago White Sox Radio Network
- Cleveland Browns Radio Network (AM flagship)
- Milwaukee Brewers Radio Network (AM flagship)
- Milwaukee Bucks Radio Network
- Los Angeles Rams Radio Network (AM Flagship)
