= WBEV =

WBEV may refer to:

- WBEV (AM), a radio station (1430 AM) licensed to serve Beaver Dam, Wisconsin, United States
- WBEV-FM, a radio station (95.3 FM) licensed to serve Beaver Dam, Wisconsin
