= WRCO =

WRCO may refer to:

- WRCO-FM, a radio station (100.9 FM) licensed to Richland Center, Wisconsin, United States
- WRCE (AM), a radio station (1450 AM) licensed to Richland Center, Wisconsin, United States, which held the call sign WRCO from 1949 to 2022
