= WBEL =

WBEL may refer to:

- WBEL (AM), a radio station (1380 AM) licensed to South Beloit, Illinois, United States
- WBEL-FM, a radio station (88.5 FM) licensed to Cairo, Illinois, United States
- White Box Enterprise Linux, a Linux distribution
