= Beryl Bernay =

American journalist and children's television creator (1926–2020)

Beryl Bernay

Beryl Bernay (March 2, 1926 – March 29, 2020) was an American journalist and children's television creator, as well as a painter and photographer.

== Early life ==
Bernay was born Beryl Bernstein in Brooklyn, New York. Her parents were Russian-Jewish immigrants. Her father was a garment worker, and her mother, Sade, sold stockings and taught kindergarten. Her father changed the family name to Berney when Beryl was a child, but Beryl changed the spelling to Bernay when she reached adulthood.

== Acting career ==
Bernay took acting classes, appearing on Broadway in Tonight in Samarkand in 1955 and later that year in ANTA's Paris production of Thornton Wilder's The Skin of Our Teeth. She returned to Broadway in 1957 as the narrator in The Dancers of Bali and toured with the production in the United States and Canada. She appeared on stage, television and radio from the late 1950s through the 2000s. Her last television appearance was in 1983 as the librarian in a Law and Order episode (Season 3, Episode 13), her last stage performance was as Aunt Ev in the 2010 production of The Miracle Worker at The Bay Street Theater in Sag Harbor, New York.

== Children's programming ==
Bernay was the creative force behind All Join Hands, America's first international children's television series. She and her two puppet co-hosts narrated the show which introduced young people to cultures from around the world through story-telling, puppetry, artwork, songs, and games. The series was produced by the United Nations' Children's Fund and was broadcast weekend mornings on CBS from 1962 to 1965. The studio audience consisted of children from the United Nations International School and public schools in Harlem and Chinatown.

Prior to creating All Join Hands, Bernay appeared in television programs geared at the young audience. She developed her craft of drawing on camera, story-telling and using puppets in her earlier program Merry-Go-Round-the-World and while hosting the children's section of the New York television program Day Watch.

1954	Tom Corbett, Space Cadet	NBC	Betty
1959-1960	Merry-Go-Round-the-World	WNTA-TV	writer, narrator
1960-1961	Day Watch	WNTA-TV	children's host, artist, puppeteer
1962-1964	All Join Hands	WCBS	creator, writer, host, artwork
1963-1964	Birthday House	WNBC	writer, performer, artwork
1966	Let's Be Friends: India, Switzerland, Nigeria, Hawaii	MacMillan Films	creator, writer, artwork, host

Bernay's phonographs for children include:

1960	Hi Neighbor: Songs and Dances from Five Countries Being Assisted by the United Nations Children's fund (five-record series)	Riverside Records, Diplomat Records	writer, performer
1963	All Join Hands with Beryl Berney	Diplomat Records	writer, performer
1963	A Child's Introduction to life in Spain and Brazil	Rocking Horse Records	writer, performer

== Journalism ==
Bernay wrote and broadcast articles on domestic and international events, first as an independent photojournalist and later as a United Nations correspondent. As an independent journalist, Bernay wrote about women in politics, human rights abuses, and politically sensitive topics. Her United Nations journalism primarily focused on Southeast Asia. Her articles and photographs have appeared as cover stories or features in numerous publications, including Newsweek, Time, Parade, the New York Times., the Herald Tribune, Christian Science Monitor, and the UN Observer.

=== Indonesia ===
Bernay had assignments in Indonesia every year from 1964 through 1978. Her first professional photography assignment was in Bali in 1964 for Holiday Magazine. It's reported that during this first Bali trip "Ms. Bernay's decades-long [journalism] career was launched," as it was then she met Indonesian President Sukarno and their professional relationship began. Already on contract with CBS for her children's show, Bernay pitched the story of the impending Indonesian regime change. She reports that CBS agreed because Sukarno assured Bernay he would grant her exclusive interviews. After briefly training Bernay in broadcast journalism, CBS sent her to Jakarta, Indonesia in 1965, where she reported before, during, and after the October 1965 attempted coup.

Bernay's political photographs of President Sukarno and General Suharto are available through Getty images. Her landscape and cultural photographs serve to illustrate Ronald McKie's 1969 book Bali. She included images of the 1966 cremation ceremony for Bali's King of Karangasem in her photography exhibitions.

Bernay took graduate courses in Cultural Anthropology with Dr. Margaret Mead at Columbia University. In 1977 Bernay went with Margaret Mead to help during the famed anthropologist's last field trip to Bali. Her photographs from this trip were exhibited at the Museum of Natural History in New York.

=== Civil rights ===
Bernay covered the May 1968 Poor People's March on Washington for Westinghouse Broadcasting and reported daily from Resurrection City, the temporary residence erected after the march in the Washington D.C. mall. Later that year, Andrew Young asked her to assist with the 1968 tribute to Dr. Martin Luther King Jr. at the Museum of Modern Art.

=== Broadcast ===
Bernay's international reporting was broadcast by multiple radio and television stations, including Group W Radio News, National Public Radio, Public Radio International, Metromedia Television, ABC, and NBC Radio and Television.

== Painting and photography ==
Though mostly a self-taught painter, as a young woman Bernay studied at Cooper Union and The Art Students League. Although she had no formal training in photography, Bernay considered lifelong friend Martin J. Dain to be a mentor. Bernay captured portraits of celebrities including Pablo Picasso, Marc Chagall, Ingrid Bergman, Maurice Chevalier, and Bertolt Brecht. Bernay's international photographs include the Far East, Mexico and France. Her Balinese photographs were exhibited in the Louisiana Museum of Modern Art in Denmark.

Bernay's fine art awards and exhibitions include:

1959	ACA Gallery	Painting, First Prize	New York, NY
1960	National Academy of Art	Painting	New York, NY
1961	Audubon Society	Painting	New York, NY
1977	Louisiana Museum of Modern Art	Bali Exhibition, Solo Show, continuous slide show of 150 photographs	Denmark
1985	World Conference on Women, 1985	Poster Photograph and Exhibit	Nairobi, Kenya
1985-2009	Ashawagh Hall	Paintings	Springs, NY
1986	The Children's Museum of Indianapolis	15 Photographs	Indianapolis, IN
2000	Grandmother Winifred Award	Photography	Sag Harbor, NY
2001	New York Foundation for the Arts	Photography	New York NY
2004	Westbeth Gallery	Solo Show, "World Untied"	New York, NY
2005	Guild Hall Museum's Artists Members Show	Painting, Honorable Mention	East Hampton, NY
2011	Southampton Cultural Center	Painting, Honorable Mention	Southampton, NY

== Death ==
Bernay died from COVID-19 complications at the age of 94 in Manhattan on March 29, 2020, during the COVID-19 pandemic in New York City.
