= WBGR =

WBGR may refer to:

- WBGR-FM, a radio station (93.7 FM) licensed to serve Monroe, Wisconsin, United States
- WBGR-LD, a low-power television station (channel 33) licensed to Bangor/Dedham, Maine, United States
- WFSI, a radio station (860 AM) licensed to Baltimore, Maryland, United States, which used the call sign WBGR until 2011
- WLZL, a radio station (107.9 FM) licensed to Annapolis, Maryland, which used the call sign WBGR in December 2011
- the ICAO code for Miri Airport
