= WNTA (1150 AM) =

Rockford, Illinois; United States
- Frequency: 1150 kHz

Programming
- Format: News/talk

Ownership
- Owner: RadioWorks; (Segueway Broadcasting Corporation)

History
- First air date: June 18, 1960
- Last air date: September 15, 1995
- Former call signs: WJRL (1960–1966); WYFE (1966–1976); WKKN (1976–1991); WNTA (1992–1995)

Technical information
- Power: 1,000 watts day; 60 watts night
- Transmitter coordinates: 42°17′28″N 88°58′56″W

WNTA (1150 AM) was a radio station in Rockford, Illinois, United States. It was last owned by the Segueway Broadcasting Corporation and operated from June 1960 until September 1995.

== History ==
Town and Country Radio, Inc., applied to the Federal Communications Commission (FCC) for a construction permit to build a new daytime-only station in Rockford, the city's third, on March 23, 1956. The owners of Town and Country Radio were John R. Livingston and David P. Pritchard, both involved with station WPEO in Peoria. The primary objections to the new station were on technical grounds by stations on nearby frequencies in Chicago and Milwaukee. The station remained unawarded for nearly four years. In April 1957, FCC examiner H. Gifford Irion recommended approving the application, but the next year, the commission granted the request of Chicago station WJJD (1160 AM) to reopen the record after it also challenged Livingston's financial qualifications. Irion then denied the application in his third ruling on the case. Ultimately, however, the application was approved by the commission on February 3, 1960.

The station went on the air as WJRL (for Livingston's initials) on about June 18, 1960, from a transmitter site at Alpine and Harrison roads and studios in the Nu-Arcade Building. Livingston retired in 1966 and sold his stock to a consortium that owned stations in Wisconsin and Michigan. The call letters then changed to WYFE on August 1 of that year, and the consortium, Heart O' Wisconsin Broadcasters, became the majority owner at year's end. Two years later, Heart O' Wisconsin filed to upgrade from 500 to 1,000 watts; the FCC approved of the change on January 28, 1971, over objections from WJJD. Heart O'Wisconsin became known in the late 1960s as Mid-West Family Broadcasting.

WYFE adopted new WKKN call letters on November 8, 1976. This coincided with a format switch to country music, intensively emphasizing promotions to compete with the large signal of WMAQ, a Chicago country music station well-heard in Rockford.

After a 15-year run as a country station, low levels of music listening on AM and general ratings underperformance prompted a change. On January 1, 1992, WKKN switched to a news/talk format as WNTA. The Rush Limbaugh Show, which had been dropped by WROK, along with local shows in morning drive and on Saturday highlighted the lineup, which was filled out with news from CNN and evening sports programming from the then-new ESPN Radio.

In 1994, WNTA and its FM sister station, WKMQ 95.3, were sold by Mid-West Family Broadcasting to Airplay Broadcasting for $1.65 million. The two stations were then co-owned by Airplay and Segueway Broadcasting. Coinciding with the closing of the sale, former WROK morning show host Chris Bowman, who had been fired from that station, joined WNTA's lineup just five days after being dismissed at its competitor. This brought them under common control with WRRR (1330 AM), then an adult standards station. When ownership—later known as RadioWorks—opted to consolidate to one AM station in Rockford, it selected WRRR's facility because it had better coverage of the east side of Rockford and Boone County and because the 1150 facility sat on valuable land that could be sold. On September 15, 1995, WNTA at 1150 went off the air. The WNTA call letters and weekday talk programming moved to 1330 kHz, retaining the former standards format on nights and weekends.
