= WRWC =

WRWC may refer to:

- WRWB-FM, a radio station (93.3 FM) licensed to serve Ellenville, New York, United States, which held the call sign WRWC from 2006 to 2009
- WGFB, a radio station (103.1 FM) licensed to serve Rockton, Illinois, United States, which held the call sign WRWC from 1967 to 2000
- Women's Rugby World Cup, in rugby union
- Women's Rugby League World Cup
