= President Obama on Death of Osama bin Laden (SPOOF) =

Single by Iman Crosson
- Released: May 4, 2011
- Genre: Spoken word and hip hop
- Length: 3:22
- Songwriter: Iman Crosson
- Producer: Iman Crosson

Music video
- "President Obama on Death of Osama bin Laden (SPOOF)" on YouTube

"President Obama on Death of Osama bin Laden (SPOOF)" is Iman Crosson's spoof video posted to the YouTube video sharing website, including a spoof of U.S. President Barack Obama's May 1, 2011 speech announcing the death of Osama bin Laden. The video is the basis of the rap music single "Momentous Day".

The video was produced by actor-impressionist and dancer Iman Crosson and posted on YouTube three days after Obama's speech. Crosson's video includes a spoken explanatory introduction followed by a spoof of Obama's speech. The spoof includes comedic dancing, and presents the speech in a rap music form, sometimes covering topics from Obama's speech with references to contemporary memes.

Popular and critical reaction focused on the video's humor and on Crosson's impersonation. Several commentators observed that the video effectively captured the national mood in the wake of bin Laden's death.

== Content ==
Three days after Barack Obama's May 1, 2011 speech from the East Room of the White House announcing the death of Osama bin Laden, actor, impressionist, dancer and Internet personality Iman Crosson posted a YouTube video titled "President Obama on Death of Osama bin Laden (SPOOF)" that parodied Obama's speech.

In the video, the East Room spoof followed a spoken-word introduction by Crosson, impersonating Barack Obama sitting at a desk, explaining that the rest of the video was an "alternative speech" that had not been chosen for broadcast, replaced by the "traditional speech" that Obama in fact delivered. In character with the spoof, TVGuide.com quipped, "originally, this diss track was supposed to be the nail in Osama's coffin". CBS News's Bailey Johnson echoed that Crosson's version was "an earlier draft of the speech — a draft very different from the one that aired."

The spoof was delivered in rap and included comedic dancing in a backdrop resembling the East Room, with The Huffington Post saying the video was "works in almost every meme from the last month". The video not only included topics relating to bin Laden's killing, but referenced Internet culture, including contemporary memes such as Charlie Sheen's "Duh, Winning", Rebecca Black, Antoine Dodson, ENJ vs. Niks, as well as snuggies, Donald Trump, and Google Earth. The single "Momentous Day" is derived from the rap portion of the video.

A clip from near the end of the video
"Obama" closes his speech before dancing out of the White House's East Room
Before returning to the White House Situation Room, Crosson's "Obama" remarks, "Oh—that'll be two terms please."

One commentator described the video as what Obama's speech—"in all likelihood the most pimp moment of his first two-and-a-half years in the White House"—"would have looked and sounded like had the man gone swag with it," characterizing Crosson's performance as a "rhymed flow over a booming, Lex Luger-esque beat." New York magazine's Amanda Dobbins referred humorously to Crosson's dancing of the Dougie as a "bonus: the official Obama Family Dance." The Post-Standard affiliate Syracuse.com's Geoff Herbert described "the witty parody rap" as "a fierce rap with lots of swag."

Crosson ended his speech with "Oh that'll be two terms please, thank you", referring to Obama's possible 2012 re-election in view of his increased popularity following the success of the bin Laden mission.

Bailey Johnson of CBS News contrasted Crosson's rap and dancing performance with Obama's "model of confidence, restraint, and calm authority", further stating that Crosson's version of the speech "seems to perfectly capture the national mood". San Francisco Chronicle contributor Zennie Abraham quoted Johnson and added that the video "exactly expresses what you and I both know Barack wanted to say after the Navy Seal Team 6 got to their objective". Al Jazeera's "Listening Post" remarked that Crosson's satirical interpretation "cuts through the usual diplomatic platitudes and delivers – what seems to be – a more honest and rhythmically tuned account of what happened." CQ Roll Call Daily Briefing Editor David Hawkings remarked that the video "skewered the president's 'no drama' affect and at the same time captured the mood of the country in the days after the Abbottabad raid."

== Viral video statistics and distinctions ==
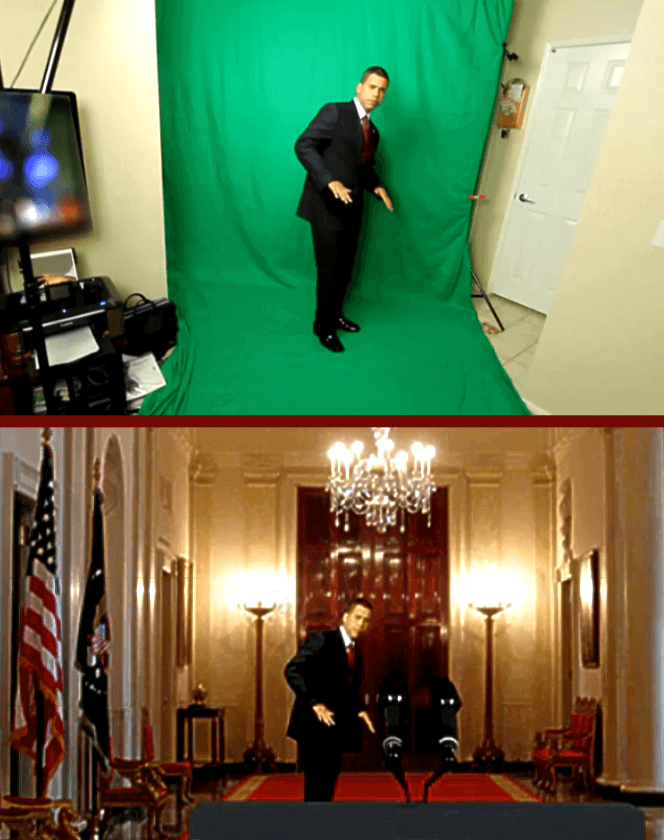
Top panel: In a "behind the scenes" video, Crosson shows his use of a "green screen" (chroma key) video compositing technique. Bottom panel: The corresponding frame in the spoof video, in which "Obama" "appears" in the White House's East Room.

The media soon responded to the video as "a viral hit".

The video was viewed at least 233,837 times in its first 24 hours, and reached its millionth view about 50 hours after being posted. and its two millionth view about 92 hours after being posted. YouTube reported Crosson's video as the platform's fifth-most viewed video, across all categories, during the first 48 hours after its upload. Crosson's "Alphacat" YouTube channel received over 20,000 new subscribers in the first six days after the video's release.

Within 72 hours, YouTube reported Crosson's video as being the Comedy category's #1 most "Popular Around the Web," which YouTube defines as "Videos with the most views when embedded on other websites". In one such embed, the video was shown on the front page of the comedy website Funny or Die.

Within nine days, the video received three million views, over 20,000 comments, and a "Like/Dislike" ratio of 51.

In August 2011, Matt Wilstein of The Huffington Post named it among the top five Obama impressions.

== Media coverage and popular response ==
The video received substantial media attention within days, with the video's views-per-day actually increasing over the course of its first three days.

Media attention included features from such news outlets and political commentators as CBS News's Bailey Johnson, The Huffington Post writers including Matt Wilstein, Al Jazeera's "Listening Post," MSNBC's "The Last Word" staff, Sean Hannity, New York magazine's Amanda Dobbins, The San Francisco Chronicle's Zennie Abraham, and The Atlantic's Chris Good, as well as recognition from comedy video websites such as Funny or Die, and mentions in pop culture and celebrity websites such as TV Guide.

Within a day of the video's posting on YouTube, Excite (Italy) reported that L'imitatore numero uno del Presidente degli Stati Uniti (the number one impersonator of the President of the United States) had turned Obama's speech into a rap. The same day, Obama's "comedic doppelganger" was said to have "spit hot fire": "with one of his best Obama impressions to date, ... his lyrics [being] pretty tight, especially coupled with his on-point presidential delivery and hitting his Dougie." CBS News's Bailey Johnson concluded that Crosson was "one of the best presidential impersonators working today." Calling Crosson "master of the interweb airwaves," Infotainment News remarked of the video, "yeah, it's a meme, and the interweb will be full of them soon enough, but this is done with good clean humor." NonAmos.com remarked that "It's difficult to strike a perfect balance between political satire and complete poor taste. But ... actor and impressionist Iman Crosson gets it right." "Alphacat is a legitimate genius for making this video spoof... Alphacat's touch up on the speech is much more than a comedic approach, it's a mass collection of all 2011 memes, from Rebecca Black's Friday, Charlie Sheen's winning, to Dougies' Dougie, it's an endless troupe of hilarity.

On the second day after the video's posting on YouTube, The Huffington Post said that the video was "fast becoming a viral hit", and that Crosson "doesn't stop at getting the look and sound of the president down, he has created an impression that is almost a parallel worlds version of the man; one who raps or sings his way through every major event while maintaining his signature calm collectedness." MSNBC's "The Last Word" linked to the video, remarking that "comedian Iman Crosson does a pretty spot-on impression of our Commander-in-Chief. He's also not half bad at writing political rhymes." TheRoot called it a "hilarious video" from "the man best known for his Obama impersonations during the 2008 elections." Fanpage Italia called it "one of the most anticipated and successful parodies by... one of the most popular political Internet Webstars." Crosson's impression of Obama was called "spot-on ... absolutely nailing the hand gestures and uh, vocal, uh, tics of our nation's 44th president."

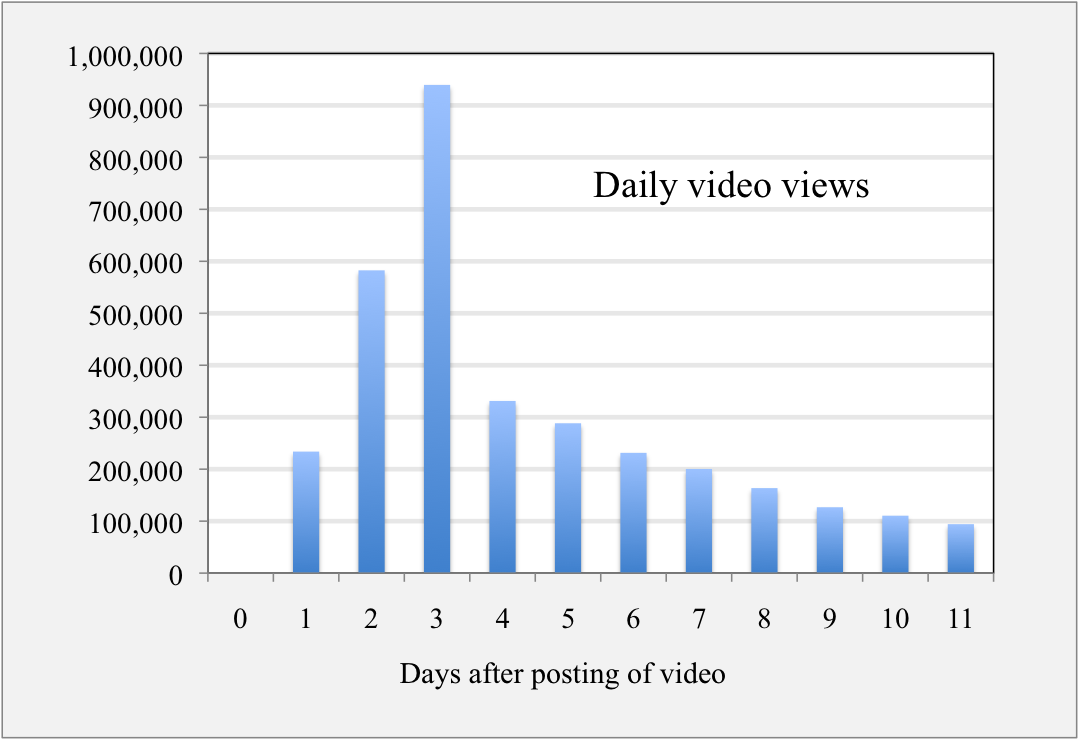
Daily video views after video was posted

On the third day, New York magazine's Amanda Dobbins called Crosson "he of the spot-on YouTube Obama impersonations", saying "he really goes in" during the video Il Quotidiano Italiano wrote that Crosson was "punctual as always" in his production of the video so quickly after the news event it was spoofing. "Alphacat, one of the most popular political Internet Webstars... has not missed an opportunity to mount a parody ad hoc for this historic event." The Moderate Voice expressed that "there have been some great spoofs of Obama in the past and this impersonator, Alphacat has been responsible for a good chunk of them. This new video has to be one of his best yet."

Ten days after the video was posted, Al Jazeera English's "Listening Post" named Crosson's video "Internet Video of the Week," remarking "we found a clip of a talented Obama impersonator putting all his acting, singing and dancing skills to work."

More than a month after the video was posted, The San Francisco Chronicle contributor Zennie Abraham commented on the spoof video and its related behind-the-scenes video, calling the spoof video "a work of genius."

Video views were possible through various other websites that had shorter commentaries, but embedded Crosson's video: The Atlantic's Chris Good ("President Obama's leading rap impersonator supplies an alternate we-killed-bin-laden announcement"), WJVL Radio (Wisconsin; "Funny Friday" video for May 6, 2011), the facebook page of Ashton Kutcher ("lol"), New England Sports Network's DirtyWaterTV ("...clever nuances. Very funny."), Power 98.3 FM website ("HILARIOUS... too funny"), Glow Radio (FusionRadio.ca; "He goes in!"), BookerRising.com ("this version of his speech would've been much better LOL"), The Hollywood Grind ("totally believable"), Jack & Jill Politics ("The Hip Hop/Pimp Walk musical version that black people secretly wish had happened...(SPOOF)"), Electronic Urban Report's "ThisNthat" (Iman Crosson delivers Obama's "real victory speech"), political commentator Sean Hannity (linked under "Faves"), rapper Funkmaster Flex ("BY FAR the most officially funny skit I've seen on the topic"), Radio 104.7 KISS FM ("Iman Crosson... does a pretty spot-on Obama"), and Mario Armstrong (interview; "incredible spoof").

== See also ==
- YouTube
- Social impact of YouTube
- United States Navy SEALs
