= WXRX =

- Belvidere, Illinois; United States
- Broadcast area: Rockford, Illinois
- Frequency: 104.9 MHz (HD Radio)
- Branding: 104.9 The X

Programming
- Format: Active rock
- Subchannels: HD2: Classic hits "Rockford's Greatest Hits, 100 FM"

Ownership
- Owner: Mid-West Family Broadcasting; (Long Nine, Inc.)
- Sister stations: WGFB, WNTA, WRTB

History
- First air date: February 27, 1971 (as WKWL)
- Former call signs: WKWL (1971–1976); WYBR (1976–1979); WYBR-FM (1979–1990)

Technical information
- Licensing authority: FCC
- Facility ID: 672
- Class: A
- ERP: 4,000 watts
- HAAT: 122 meters (400 ft)
- Transmitter coordinates: 42°19′21.1″N 88°57′14.4″W
- Translator: HD2: 100.5 W263BJ (Loves Park)

Links
- Public license information: Public file; LMS
- Webcast: Listen live; HD2: Listen live
- Website: www.thexrockford.com; HD2: www.100fmrockford.com

WXRX (104.9 FM, commonly known as "The X") is a radio station. Licensed to Belvidere, Illinois, the station serves the Rockford, Illinois area. Originally created by a company called "Radio Works" run by David McAley and Robert Rhea Jr., it is now owned by Mid-West Family Broadcasting. WXRX started as a classic rock station.

WXRX broadcasts two channels in the HD format.

Popular disc jockeys that have worked for WXRX include Jonathon Brandmeier, Tim Crull, Cheryl Jackson as K.C. Meadows, Sky Drysdale, Alan Cox, Jamie Markley, Mark Zander Jim Stone, as Mark Edwards, Lori Hastings, and Pete McMurray.

In the 1992 motion picture Batman Returns, WXRX is a fictional television station in Gotham City.

== History ==
The station went on the air as WKWL on February 27, 1971, playing a "Good Music" format and affiliated with ABC News Radio. The 300-foot (91 m) tower was co-located with the studios on N. Bell School Road in Rockford. A fire in the basement where the transmitter was located burned the entire building to the ground.

The license was acquired in December 1974, and the station was rebuilt at the Cherryvale Mall. It returned to the air in 1976 with the call letters WYBR (for "We're the Yellow Brick Road"), transmitting from a 300-foot (91 m) tower in the Cherryvale parking lot, with studios inside the mall in suite E-114. The plan was to use an "Oz" format, including a helicopter traffic report called "Ork Reports."

The initial format was termed "Theatre of the Mind", and the first airstaff included many people with theatrical background. Actress Susan Saint James was a frequent visitor and contributor to station programming elements. The format gradually migrated to an adult contemporary/MOR format in the late 1970s. Future WLUP jock Jonathon "Johnny B." Brandmeier was the morning DJ from 1978 to 1980.

The station changed to Top 40 in 1983, then to classic rock in October 1986.

RadioWorks, Inc acquired WYBR-FM (and WRRR) in August 1989. Over the next four months, the company undertook a total upgrade of the station's audio chain. The debut of WXRX at midnight on January 1, 1990, was supported by an intensive TV advertising campaign. A year and a half after the debut, WXRX rose to #1 in the market according to the Arbitron report. This displaced WROK and WZOK after a 25-year span where one or the other had been #1 overall in Rockford.

In October 1992 Pete McMurray was hired as WXRX's 1st ever morning DJ, along with Linda Lampert as his co-host and thus "McMurray and Lampert in the Morning" was born. No morning show in the history of WXRX has achieved higher ratings or a bigger following than Pete McMurray and Linda Lampert. Then after almost 5 years at WXRX Linda Lampert had left in 1996, and then in 1998 after 6 rockin' years at WXRX morning DJ Pete McMurray had also too left for WCKG in Chicago, Illinois.

From 1992 to 1996 Pete McMurray and Linda Lampert reigned as the king and queen of Rockford morning radio.

== Translator ==
Call sign	Frequency	City of license	FID	ERP (W)	HAAT	Class	Transmitter coordinates	FCC info	Notes
W263BJ	100.5 FM	Loves Park, Illinois	155295	230	106.8 m (350 ft)	D	42°19′21.1″N 88°57′14.4″W	LMS	Relays HD2
