= WRCE =

WRCE may refer to:

- WRCE (AM), a radio station (1450 AM) licensed to Richland Center, Wisconsin, United States
- WNGZ (AM), a radio station (1490 AM) licensed to Watkins Glen, New York, United States, which held the call sign WRCE from 2008 to 2020
