= WWHG =

Coordinates: 42.727°N 89.251°W

- Evansville, Wisconsin; United States
- Broadcast area: Madison, Wisconsin, Janesville, Wisconsin
- Frequency: 105.9 MHz
- Branding: 105-9 The Hog

Programming
- Format: Mainstream rock
- Affiliations: Compass Media Networks

Ownership
- Owner: Scott Thompson; (Big Radio)
- Sister stations: WBEL, WBGR-FM

History
- First air date: 1989 (as WMJB)
- Former call signs: WEBU (1988–1989, CP); WMJB (1989–1997); WKPO (1997–2007)
- Call sign meaning: "Hog"

Technical information
- Licensing authority: FCC
- Facility ID: 59612
- Class: A
- ERP: 1,700 watts
- HAAT: 147 meters (482 ft)

Links
- Public license information: Public file; LMS
- Webcast: Listen live
- Website: www.1059thehog.com

WWHG (105.9 FM) is a commercial mainstream rock radio station licensed to Evansville, Wisconsin, and serving the areas of Madison and Janesville. The station is owned by Scott Thompson, through licensee Big Radio, and began a new rock music format as "105-9 The Hog" on January 13, 2007, after several years with a Rhythmic Top 40 format.

WWHG is the flagship station for radio play-by-play of UW-Whitewater athletics.

== History ==
WKPO's former logo as "Hot 105.9"

After being instituted a construction permit as WEBU in 1988, the station signed on with an adult contemporary format, and then classic rock, all under the call letters WMJB. After stunting with TV theme songs, the station flipped to rhythmic adult contemporary in October 1997. Adopting the calls WKPO, the station was known as "Power 105-9" with a more pop/dance sound featuring hits from the 1970s, 1980s and 1990s with less repetition. By 2000, it had evolved into a full-blown rhythmic CHR format. In December 2001, the station became known as "105-9 KPO"; soon after, it became "Hot 105-9" with the same format. As a rhythmic station, WKPO fared better in the Janesville area (where its signal was at its strongest), although it did have some success in the Madison area as its format was unique to that market. During its time as a rhythmic, the station was an affiliate of the Portland, Oregon-based "Playhouse" morning show.

At midnight on January 10, 2007, WKPO abruptly dropped Rhythmic Top 40. After looping "Hip Hop Is Dead" by Nas all day on the 10th, the station reverted to a stunt of different music from different formats, with voiceovers suggesting any one of them could be the new format that would launch on January 13. At 10 a.m. that day, WKPO's new format was unveiled: album-oriented rock as "105.9 The Hog", promising "Everything that rocks, not just from one decade." "You Shook Me All Night Long" by AC/DC and "Smells Like Teen Spirit" by Nirvana were the first two songs played on the new "105-9 The Hog."

The new format and the "Hog" imaging are a direct copy of Saga Communications-owned WHQG in Milwaukee ("102.9 The Hog"). Indeed, "105-9 The Hog" aired the Bob and Brian show—a program that originates from WHQG—during its morning drive time for a period. (The show had aired on sister station WTLX since 2003.)

Coinciding with the format switch, the station's call letters changed to WWHG (although in the days immediately after the flip, the station did identify themselves with the calls "WHGG").

However, the rhythmic format would make a surprise return to the Madison radio market on January 26, 2007, when WSLK dropped their simulcast of WHLK to become WJQM, "106.7 Jamz". When the Wisconsin State Journal asked Keith Williams, general manager of WWHG, about the format being picked up by another outlet in the market, he said he had no regrets about changing the station's format, but he said he would listen to the new hip-hop station. "I love the format," Williams said. "I wish them the best of luck."

In January 2014, Good Karma Broadcasting announced that it would sell WWHG and sister station WTJK (1380 AM) to Scott Thompson's Big Radio. As part of the deal, the new owners began operating the stations through a local marketing agreement on February 1. The sale was completed on May 12, 2014 at a purchase price of $1.45 million.
