= Mel Karmazin =

American executive (born 1943)

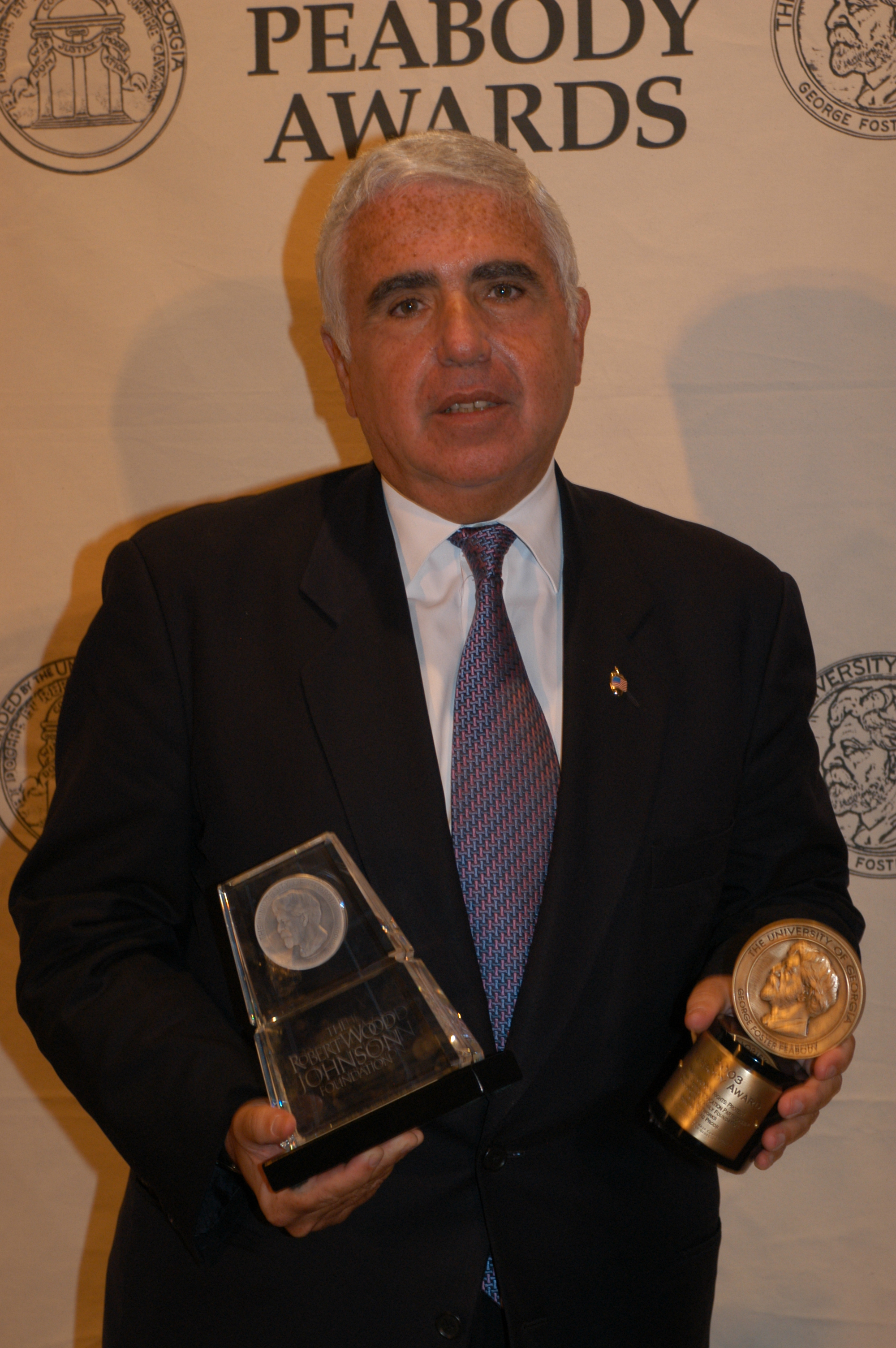
- Karmazin at the 2004 Peabody Awards
- Born: August 24, 1943 (age 83); Long Island City, New York, U.S.
- Education: Pace University
- Spouse(s): Sharon Matlofsky (divorced); Terry Malia (2001–present)
- Children: Dina Leslie Karmazin Elkins; Craig Karmazin

Melvin Alan "Mel" Karmazin (born August 24, 1943) is an American executive. He was the president of Infinity Broadcasting (formerly known as CBS Radio now Audacy, Inc.) and eventually became the president and CEO of CBS. From 2004 to 2013, he was the CEO of Sirius Radio.

== Early life and education ==
Karmazin was born in 1943 to a Jewish family in Long Island City, Queens in New York City. His father was a taxi driver and his mother a factory worker. Mel Karmazin first worked as a typist for an advertising firm in high school and then started selling radio ads at the age of 17. He graduated from Pace University with a bachelor's degree in business administration.

== Career ==
=== Early broadcasting and Infinity (1960s–1991) ===
After school, he worked for Columbia Broadcasting System selling ads for their radio division. In the late 1960s, Karmazin left to work for the broadcasting company Metromedia. At Metromedia from 1970 to 1981, Karmazin presided over New York's WNEW (now WBBR) and WNEW-FM.

He was approached to run Infinity Broadcasting in 1981. Soon after he would add fellow New York stations WKTU and WFAN into Infinity's stable. WFAN morning talent Don Imus often referred to Karmazin on the air, never by name, but by the nickname "The Zen Master". In the 1980s, he hired Howard Stern after Stern was fired for another station. In 1992, he took Infinity public, then sold it in 1996 to CBS via Westinghouse, then the parent of CBS, for $4.9 billion.

=== CBS and Viacom (1997–2004) ===
When Infinity merged with CBS Corporation in January 1997, Karmazin began heading CBS Radio as chairman and CEO. In May 1997 he became chairman and CEO of the CBS Station Group, overseeing the network's radio and television properties. Karmazin ran the combined radio operations after that of Infinity, Westinghouse, and CBS, along with its outdoor advertising business. He served as president and chief operating officer of CBS Corporation from April 1998 until January 1999. In October 1998, Karmazin "forced" his superior's resignation at CBS, becoming CEO of CBS in 1999.

In 2000, he became COO of Viacom-CBS, after Viacom, a media conglomerate that includes CBS, UPN, MTV, BET, Comedy Central, Paramount Pictures and Showtime, absorbed CBS Corporation that year. As an executive of an even bigger conglomerate, Karmazin and Viacom chief Sumner Redstone had many differences, leading to Karmazin's resignation in May 2004. Karmazin later said he didn't get along with Redstone and found it difficult to be "No. 2" at a company, but particularly under Redstone. The two executives continued to snipe at each other through the media even a year after Karmazin left Viacom.

=== Sirius (2004–2012) ===
From 2004 to 2012, he was the CEO of Sirius Radio (re-branded Sirius XM Radio after XM merged with Sirius in 2008). He became the CEO of Sirius in November 2004. He was a strong supporter of radio personality Howard Stern at Viacom, and Karmazin joined Sirius Radio shortly after the company signed Stern. In his first year at Sirius, Fortune magazine reported in November 2005, Karmazin reached deals with Ford and BMW to include the company's radios in their new cars and helped launch Sirius's first portable music player (both initiatives were in the wake of Sirius's rival, XM Radio, pioneering those moves). He also recruited Martha Stewart to Sirius, acquired the programming rights to NASCAR, and raised $500 million in debt financing.

In October 2012, Karmazin announced that he would be stepping down on February 1, 2013. Upon his departure, John C. Malone took over Karmazin's role at SiriusXM. Karmazin's reported 2012 pay and severance from Sirius XM amounted to over $255 million, making him the third highest paid CEO that year after Mark Zuckerberg and Richard Kinder.

For most of his career he has been known as a "Wall Street darling" for his ability to drive up the price of his various companies' stock. "The joke about him was that he was so pushy that advertisers used to buy airtime from Mel just to get him out of their office," according to a Fortune magazine article. Karmazin was inducted into the Broadcasting Hall of Fame, the National Radio Hall of Fame, a recipient of the National Association of Broadcasters National Radio Award, and the IRTS Gold Medal.

== Personal life ==
Karmazin and his former wife Sharon Karmazin have two children: a daughter Dina (born 1971) and a son Craig (born 1975). Sharon is the retired director of the East Brunswick Library and established the Karma Foundation dedicated to the development and enrichment of Jewish life. Like his father, Craig Karmazin went into radio, and founded Good Karma Broadcasting, which owns a number of radio stations. Dina graduated from the University of Miami and married in 1993. In 1994, Sharon and Mel divorced.

In June 2001, Karmazin married his longtime executive assistant, Terry Malia. Karmazin is a resident of Greenwich, Connecticut.
