= WHTL-FM =

Coordinates: 44.412°N 91.282°W

- Whitehall, Wisconsin; United States
- Frequency: 102.3 MHz
- Branding: 102.3 WHTL

Programming
- Format: Classic hits
- Affiliations: Packers Radio Network

Ownership
- Owner: WHTL Group, LLC

History
- First air date: 18 May 1981
- Call sign meaning: WHiTehaLl, later Wisconsin's HearTLand

Technical information
- Licensing authority: FCC
- Facility ID: 72325
- Class: A
- ERP: 1,550 watts
- HAAT: 122 meters

Links
- Public license information: Public file; LMS
- Webcast: Listen Live
- Website: www.whtlradio.com

WHTL-FM (102.3 MHz) is a radio station licensed to Whitehall, Wisconsin. It plays a classic hits music format.

WHTL-FM came to the air in 1981, playing contemporary hit music, and has since had a variety of formats. Currently, WHTL plays hits from the 1960s to the early 2000s. The station covers local high school sports and community events, in addition to carrying Green Bay Packers football games. The station broadcasts 24 hours a day, 7 days a week with live shows hosted from 6 A.M. until 6 P.M. Monday through Friday.

Current on-air personalities include: Mark Ste. Marie, host of Mid-Days with Mark. Garrett "Buck" Davy, host of Happy Hour. And Brian Bethke, host of Coffee with Brian. Previous on-air personalities include: Marty "Little" Goss, who hosted various shows and provided play-by-play for local sports during his 33 years with the station. Mike Gilbertson who hosted The Morning Ride for nearly eight years. The station has been owned by Eugene "Butch" Halama since 2005. Steve Tudhope is the programming director, and the station manager is Barb Semb.

WHTL-FM's transmitter is located about 5 miles northeast of Whitehall and is on the highest point in Trempealeau County. WHTL's signal covers much of western Wisconsin including the nearby cities of Arcadia, Black River Falls, Neilsville, Eau Claire, Durand, Buffalo City, La Crosse, and Winona.
