= WRLS-FM =

- Hayward, Wisconsin; United States
- Broadcast area: Rice Lake-Spooner, Wisconsin
- Frequency: 92.3 MHz
- Branding: 92.3 WRLS

Programming
- Format: Adult contemporary
- Affiliations: Fox News Radio

Ownership
- Owner: Vacationland Broadcasting, Inc.

History
- First air date: April 16, 1968
- Call sign meaning: Rivers Lakes-Streams

Technical information
- Licensing authority: FCC
- Facility ID: 69639
- Class: A
- ERP: 6,000 watts
- HAAT: 98 meters (322 ft)
- Transmitter coordinates: 46°01′14″N 91°30′41″W

Links
- Public license information: Public file; LMS
- Website: wrlsfm.com

WRLS-FM (92.3 MHz) is a radio station licensed to serve the community of Hayward, Wisconsin, United States. The station's broadcast license is held by Vacationland Broadcasting, Inc.

WRLS-FM broadcasts an adult contemporary music format to the greater Hayward, Wisconsin-Spooner, Wisconsin, area. The station airs select news programming from NBC News Radio. WRLS-FM airs the National Football League games of the Green Bay Packers as an affiliate of the Packers Radio Network.

The station was assigned the call sign WRLS-FM by the Federal Communications Commission on January 15, 1980.

== History ==
WRLS-FM traces its origins to Pine-Aire Broadcasting Corporation, which applied in 1967 for a new FM station at Hayward on 92.1 MHz, channel 221, with 3,000 watts of power and an antenna height above average terrain of 295 feet. The application listed Walter West as president and Robert Allan Anderson as vice president, among other principals. In March 1968, Broadcasting reported that the Federal Communications Commission had granted the WRLS-FM call letters to Pine-Aire Broadcasting Corporation of Hayward. The station's own history states that WRLS-FM has served its listening audience since 1968.

By the late 1970s, WRLS-FM was an established local broadcast service in Hayward. In a 1978 FCC rulemaking notice concerning an additional FM channel for Hayward, the Commission described the community's local aural service as consisting of daytime-only AM station WHSM and WRLS-FM on channel 221A. FCC-derived facility records list the WRLS-FM call sign from January 15, 1980, preceded in the database by WRLSFM.

In 1989, the FCC upheld a $7,500 forfeiture against Pine-Aire Broadcasting Corporation, then the licensee of WRLS-FM, for repeated violations of the Commission's rules concerning the broadcast of lottery information.

In late 1989, Pine-Aire Broadcasting petitioned the FCC to substitute channel 222C3 for channel 221A at Hayward and to modify WRLS-FM's license to specify the higher-powered channel. The FCC opened MM Docket No. 89-620 in January 1990 and stated that the proposal could provide Hayward with its first wide-coverage-area FM service. Pine-Aire ultimately filed a 1992 application to move WRLS-FM from 92.1 to 92.3 MHz, increase effective radiated power to 6,000 watts, use an antenna height above average terrain of 98 meters, and remain a Class A FM station. Broadcasting reported that the FCC granted that application on April 30, 1992. FCCInfo's application records list the station's minor modification as granted April 30, 1992, and its license to cover the modified facility as granted March 23, 1993.

Later in 1992, Pine-Aire Broadcasting sought FCC consent to assign WRLS-FM's construction permit to Vacationland Broadcasting, Inc. Broadcasting reported that the proposed assignment was valued at $275,000, with Pine-Aire headed by Ida Meyer and Vacationland headed by Thomas Koser. The FCC granted the assignment on December 9, 1992. Vacationland Broadcasting remains the station's licensee. FCC-derived records list WRLS-FM as a commercial Class A FM station on 92.3 MHz, with facility ID 69639, 6,000 watts effective radiated power and 98 meters HAAT.

WRLS-FM has continued to operate as a local service for the Hayward area and the surrounding "Vacationland" region. The station describes its music format as adult contemporary, featuring songs from the late 1970s through current artists. Its local service has included weather reports, Emergency Alert System information, local and regional news, Fox News Radio updates, Hayward Hurricanes high-school sports, Green Bay Packers football, Wisconsin Badgers football and basketball, and Hayward Hawks baseball. The station also states that it was named the Hayward Area Chamber of Commerce's Small Business of the Year in 2011.
