= Craig Karmazin =

American radio executive

- Born: July 11, 1975 (age 51); Northern New Jersey
- Education: B.B.A. Emory University
- Occupation: GKB Founder/CEO
- Known for: Founder of Good Karma Brands (GKB)
- Children: Harper Karmazin
- Parent(s): Sharon Karmazin; Mel Karmazin
- Awards: 2021 NBA Champion

Craig Karmazin (born July 11, 1975) is the founder and chief executive officer of Good Karma Brands (GKB).

== Early life and education ==
Born in 1975 in northern New Jersey, Karmazin is the son of Sharon and Mel Karmazin. He has an older sister, Dina Leslie Karmazin Elkins. His father is the former CEO of Sirius XM Radio and former president of Viacom. His mother is the retired director of the East Brunswick Library, and established the Karma Foundation in 1996 to provide grants in support of activities and programs such as art, autism, education, health, and Jewish life. She has also produced plays in New Jersey. His parents divorced in 1994. Karmazin and his childhood friend grew up in New Jersey recording their own radio programs on a cassette player, and later worked together for four years as interns at a sports-talk station in Philadelphia. As a teenager, he worked in sales at The Sports Authority. He attended Emory University, studying business and graduated with a B.B.A.

== Career ==
=== Early radio purchases (1997-2000) ===
In 1997, Karmazin interned at Infinity-owned WIP in Philadelphia. In 1997, he secured a $3.5 million loan from a New York City bank and purchased three radio stations in the Madison area and then went on to purchase more stations in small towns: two in Wisconsin and one in Rockford, Illinois. He then entered larger markets purchasing a station West Palm Beach, Florida and two in Milwaukee, Wisconsin (WAUK, and formerly, WRRD), and affiliated those stations with ESPN Radio.

In 1998, Karmazin founded Good Karma Broadcasting, a sports radio firm in Beaver Dam, Wisconsin. Karmazin selected the area due to its proximity to the University of Wisconsin campus.

=== Good Karma and ESPN (2001-present) ===
In 2006, he entered the Cleveland market simultaneously purchasing the gospel music station WABQ 1540 and the rights to the ESPN brand from sports talk station 850 WKNR, reformatting WABQ as a sports station. A short time later, he purchased WKNR. The net cost for both stations was $9.5 million. In 2012, Good Karma expanded its operations, opening three remodeled houses near Lambeau Field in Green Bay to entertain clients and fans, as well as a Verizon Wireless store in Beaver Dam. With Karmazin as president and CEO of Good Karma Broadcasting in Beaver Dam in 2012, it had radio stations in five markets. Karmazin was also working as an anonymous sports broadcaster for ESPN Milwaukee. By 2013 he was owner of 12 sports radio stations in the US, eight of which by 2013 were ESPN affiliated.

On July 16, 2014, Karmazin purchased a minority stake in the Milwaukee Bucks of the National Basketball Association (NBA). In the fall of 2018, Karmazin purchased the flagship station of the Green Bay Packers and Milwaukee Brewers, WTMJ Radio, along with WKTI from the E. W. Scripps Company. He converted WKTI to a local sports station affiliated with ESPN Radio, with WAUK moving to a national schedule (WTMJ's schedule remained the same). He was a 2021 NBA Champion, as part owner of the Milwaukee Bucks.

== Personal life ==
He met his partner, Kelli Gabel, on a radio broadcast. They have a daughter.
