= WMDX =

Radio station in Columbus, Wisconsin

- Columbus, Wisconsin; United States
- Broadcast area: Madison metropolitan area
- Frequency: 1580 kHz
- Branding: Mad Radio 92.7

Programming
- Language: English
- Format: Progressive talk
- Affiliations: ABC News Radio

Ownership
- Owner: Civic Media; (Civic Media, Inc.)
- Sister stations: WAUK; WISS; WRCE; WRCO; WRPQ

History
- First air date: April 2, 1950; 76 years ago
- Former call signs: WTTN (1950–2023)

Technical information
- Licensing authority: FCC
- Facility ID: 71092
- Class: D
- Power: 5,000 watts (day); 800 watts (critical hours); 4 watts (night)
- Transmitter coordinates: 43°11′43″N 88°45′17″W
- Translator: 92.7 W224EG (Madison)

Links
- Public license information: Public file; LMS
- Website: wmdxradio.com

WMDX (1580 AM) is a commercial radio station licensed to Columbus, Wisconsin, and serving the Madison metropolitan area. The station is owned by Sage Weil, through licensee Civic Media, Inc. Branded as "92.7 WMDX", the station airs a progressive talk radio format. WMDX carries live locally produced news and talk programming for most of the day, originating from studios located on State Street in downtown Madison, as well the Racine studios of sister station WAUK. The station also carries live syndicated programming from Stephanie Miller and Thom Hartmann. WMDX also serves as the flagship station of the Civic Media Network, a statewide news network with affiliates across Wisconsin.

WMDX transmits 5,000 watts daytime, using a directional antenna that provides city-grade coverage of the northern and eastern portions of the Madison area including Columbia and Dodge counties. As 1580 kHz is a Canadian clear channel frequency, WMDX must protect Class A CKDO Oshawa, from interference. During critical hours, WMDX drops to 800 watts, and after sunset, to only 4 watts, which roughly covers only the city of Columbus. The transmitter is off Parpart Road in Hampden, Wisconsin. All programming is simulcast on 250-watt FM translator 92.7 W224EG which affords WMDX 24/7 city grade signal to most of Dane County .

== History ==
WMDX began broadcasting on April 2, 1950, as WTTN, and was licensed to Watertown, Wisconsin. The station ran 250 watts, during daytime hours only, and was owned by Watertown Radio, Inc. In 1961, the station's power was increased to 1,000 watts, and it began to be simulcast on 104.7 WTTN-FM. WTTN aired a middle of the road (MOR) format in the 1970s and 1980s. Nighttime operations were added in the late 1980s, running 7.8 watts. The station adopted a country music format in 1991.

In 1999, WTTN was sold to Good Karma Broadcasting for $525,000. In 2001, the station adopted a news-talk format. In January 2003, WTTN adopted an oldies format. The station was branded "The Goose" during this period.

In 2009, WTTN's city of license and transmitter site were moved to Columbus, Wisconsin, and its daytime power was increased to 5,000 watts using a directional array. This move allowed for co-owned 100.5 WTLX to be moved from Columbus to Monona. Later that year, the station adopted a Spanish language sports format as an affiliate of ESPN Deportes. In 2018, the station adopted a progressive talk format branded as "Resistance Radio", simulcasting Milwaukee based sister station WRRD. This marked a return of the progressive talk format to the strongly liberal leaning Madison area since the format change of iHeart Media's WXXM to Adult Hits in 2016.

On February 6, 2023, WTTN rebranded as "Mad Radio 92.7" under new WMDX call letters. Effective February 21, 2023, WMDX and translator W224EG were sold by Good Karma Broadcasting to Civic Media, Inc. for $363,000.

== Translator ==
On May 14, 2019, WTTN began to simulcast on Madison translator W224EG (92.7 FM), and was rebranded as "Talk 92.7".

Broadcast translator for WMDX
| Call sign | Frequency | City of license | FID | ERP (W) | HAAT | Class | FCC info |
|---|---|---|---|---|---|---|---|
| W224EG | 92.7 FM | Madison, Wisconsin | 200994 | 250 | 121 m (397 ft) | D | LMS |
