= WNIU =

Coordinates: 42.015°N 89.002°W

- Rockford, Illinois; United States
- Broadcast area: Rockford, Illinois
- Frequency: 90.5 MHz (HD Radio)
- Branding: Northern Public Radio

Programming
- Format: Public radio (Classical music)
- Affiliations: American Public Media (Classical 24)

Ownership
- Owner: Northern Illinois University

History
- First air date: April 21, 1991 (as WNIJ)
- Former call signs: WNIJ (1991–1997)

Technical information
- Licensing authority: FCC
- Facility ID: 49545
- Class: B
- ERP: 50,000 watts
- HAAT: 112 meters (367 ft)
- Translator: 105.7 W289AB (Rockford)

Links
- Public license information: Public file; LMS
- Webcast: Listen live
- Website: www.northernpublicradio.org

WNIU (90.5 FM) is a public radio station licensed to Northern Illinois University in DeKalb, Illinois, United States. It is part of Northern Public Radio along with WNIJ. It primarily features classical music programming. WNIU broadcasts in the hybrid digital HD format.

Established in 1954, WNIU serves the Northern Illinois region. It provides a diverse range of programming to its listeners, including live classical performances, interviews with musicians, and coverage of local arts and cultural events.

== Translator ==
Broadcast translator for WNIU
Call sign	Frequency	City of license	FID	ERP (W)	FCC info
W289AB	105.7 FM	Rockford, Illinois	49549	55	LMS
