= Iman Crosson =

American actor and comedian

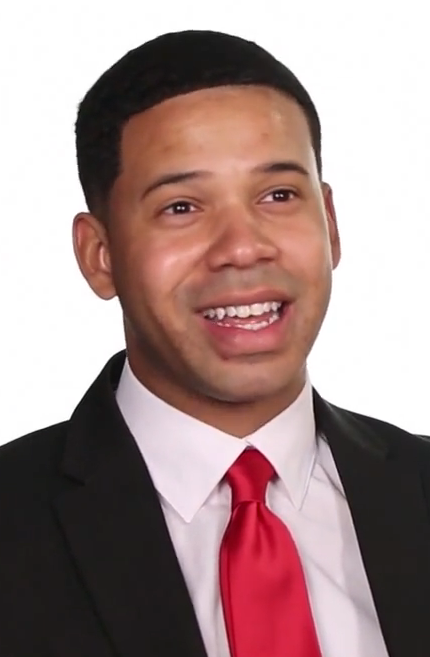
- Crosson in 2014
- Born: Louisville, Kentucky, U.S.
- Occupations: Actor, impressionist
- Years active: 2005–present
- Website: YouTube.com/Alphacat

Iman Crosson, better known by his stage name Alphacat, is an American actor, impressionist, and YouTube personality known for his impersonations of former U.S. President Barack Obama and his starring role in independent film Along the Roadside.

== YouTube and Barack Obama impressions ==
On December 14, 2005, Crosson opened a YouTube account with screen name Alphacat. In July 2008, at the urging of his fellow waiters, Crosson created spoof videos of then–U.S. presidential candidate Barack Obama.

During the summer of the 2008 U.S. Presidential election campaign, Crosson's 30-second video won Denny's Restaurant's nationwide contest for the best impressionist of the then-candidate Barack Obama. He said that he "went from unemployed to self-employed in literally a matter of a month." Crosson moved from New York to California, obtained an agent specializing in helping talent crossover from online to mainstream, and was invited to be on America's Got Talent.

On YouTube, Crosson specialized in mashing up his Obama impersonations with hip-hop songs, his spoofs of Beyoncé's "Single Ladies" and T.I.'s "Whatever U Like" being viewed more than 20 million times each.

After Obama's January 2009 inauguration, Crosson was featured on several entertainment and news television shows, blogs, and newspapers. Crosson was called a "YouTube sensation" by Fox News' Neil Cavuto.

Crosson's post-inaugural work included voice-overs in Newsweek's The District, a video series in which Crosson narrated Obama's first months in Washington from the President's point of view. Crosson impersonated Obama at the 66th Annual Radio and Television Correspondents' Association Dinner on March 17, 2010.

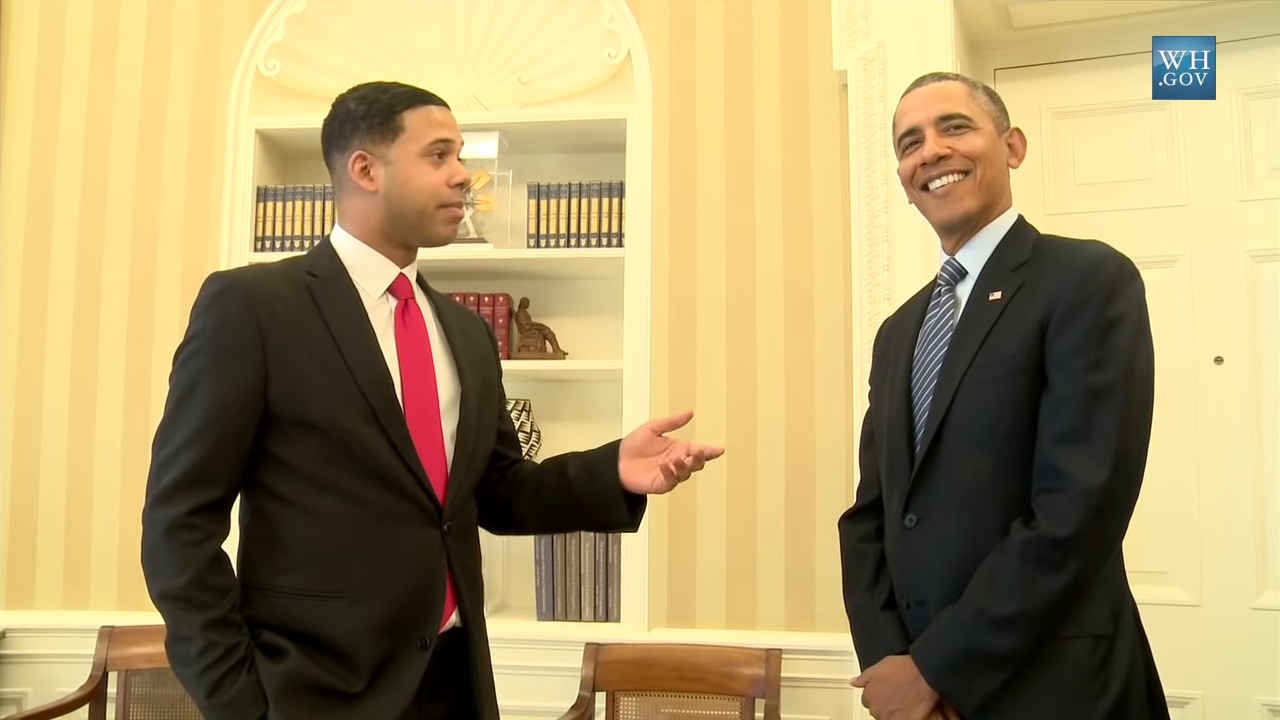
Crosson was among YouTube content creators who met at the White House in February 2014 with U.S. President Obama to start a dialogue about health insurance awareness and enrollment, as well as anti-bullying, education, and economic opportunity.

In October 2012, Crosson performed as Obama in the YouTube series Epic Rap Battles of History with the episode "Barack Obama vs. Mitt Romney", the music single of which was certified gold by the RIAA.

In December 2013, Crosson contributed to an Affordable Care Act social media campaign by releasing a video spoof of Snoop Dogg's "Drop It Like It's Hot." In February 2014, YouTube content creators including Crosson met with U.S. President Obama at the White House to discuss ways in which government could connect with the content creators' viewers, concerning awareness of and enrollment in health insurance policies and other issues.

== Filmography ==
=== Film ===
Year	Title	Role	Notes	Refs.
2013	Along the Roadside	Varnie	Independent film	
2016	Tere Bin Laden: Dead or Alive	Barack Obama	Bollywood comedy	

=== Television ===
Year	Title	Role	Notes	Refs.
2018	Our Cartoon President	Barack Obama	Voice	
2024	NCIS	Lt. Elliot Greene		
2026	Wonder Man	Actor in Hallway		

=== Web series ===
Year	Title	Role	Notes	Refs.
2009	Newsweek	Barack Obama (voice)	5 videos for 'The District' documentary mini-series on Newsweek YouTube account	
2011–present	Alphacat	Barack Obama / Various	Videos on YouTube including President Obama on Death of Osama bin Laden (SPOOF)	
2012	Epic Rap Battles of History	Barack Obama	Episode: "Barack Obama vs. Mitt Romney"	
2012	Annoying Orange	Broccoli Obama	Episode: "Kitchen Decision 2012"	

== See also ==
- List of actors who have played the president of the United States
