= WRPQ =

Radio station in Baraboo, Wisconsin

- Baraboo, Wisconsin; United States
- Broadcast area: Wisconsin Dells, Wisconsin
- Frequency: 740 kHz
- Branding: 99.7 Max FM

Programming
- Format: Adult hits / Variety hits
- Affiliations: ABC, Wisconsin Radio Network, Civic Media

Ownership
- Owner: Civic Media; (Civic Media, Inc.)
- Sister stations: WMDX, WRCE, WRCO

History
- First air date: June 1967 (as WBOO)
- Former call signs: WBOO (1967–1981)

Technical information
- Licensing authority: FCC
- Facility ID: 3712
- Class: D
- Power: 250 watts day 6 watts night
- Transmitter coordinates: 43°27′19″N 89°45′13″W
- Translators: 99.7 W259BC (Baraboo); 103.7 W279EG (Baraboo)

Links
- Public license information: Public file; LMS
- Webcast: Listen live
- Website: max.fm

WRPQ (740 AM) is a radio station broadcasting an adult hits/variety hits format. Licensed to Baraboo, Wisconsin, United States, the station serves the Wisconsin Dells area. The station is currently owned by Sage Weil, through licensee Civic Media, Inc. The station's original cal sign was WBOO. It simulcasts on FM translators W259BC 99.7 FM and W279EG 103.7 FM, both in Baraboo.

== History ==
The station first began broadcasting in June 1967 under the call letters WBOO. Licensed as a "daytimer" on 740 kHz, the station was required to sign off at sunset to protect the clear-channel signal of CFZM in Toronto. In its early decades, WBOO served as a primary source of local news and middle-of-the-road (MOR) music for Sauk County and the Wisconsin Dells area.

In 1981, the station adopted the WRPQ call letters.. For many years, it was known as "The Big Q," operating with a full-service adult contemporary format that featured heavy emphasis on local Baraboo high school sports and community events.

On September 18, 2017, WRPQ changed its format from adult contemporary to adult hits / variety hits, branded as "99.7 Max FM". The station focuses on music from the '80s and '90s, but also plays some 2000s and current songs. The station was acquired by Civic Media, a Wisconsin-based group focused on local journalism and progressive talk, though the station has maintained its musical variety identity.
