= WJVL =

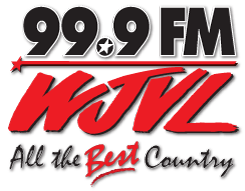
- Janesville, Wisconsin; United States
- Broadcast area: Janesville, Wisconsin; Madison, Wisconsin; Rockford, Illinois
- Frequency: 99.9 MHz
- Branding: All the Best Country 99.9 WJVL

Programming
- Format: Country
- Affiliations: Compass Media Networks; Premiere Networks; Packers Radio Network

Ownership
- Owner: Benjamin Thompson
- Sister stations: WCLO

History
- First air date: 1947 as WCLO-FM
- Former call signs: WCLO-FM (1947–1970)
- Call sign meaning: W JanesViLle"

Technical information
- Licensing authority: FCC
- Facility ID: 61390
- Class: B1
- ERP: 11,000 watts
- HAAT: 153 meters
- Transmitter coordinates: 42°43′47.00″N 89°10′10.00″W

Links
- Public license information: Public file; LMS
- Webcast: https://player.aiir.com/wjvl/
- Website: wjvl.com

WJVL (99.9 FM) is a country music-formatted radio station licensed to Janesville, Wisconsin, and serving the areas of Janesville and Madison, Wisconsin and Rockford, Illinois. The station is owned by Benjamin Thompson and describes itself as playing "Top 40 country mixed with country golds."

== History ==
In 1947, WCLO-FM went on the air as the sister station to WCLO. WCLO-FM was Wisconsin's first network FM station. It later became WJVL. After some years as "Music of your Life", WJVL changed to a country format in 1982.

WJVL's tower is located on N. Roherty Road between Janesville and Evansville, Wisconsin.

WJVL & WCLO are owned and operated by Benjamin Thompson.
