= WRCO-FM =

Radio station in Richland Center, Wisconsin

- Richland Center, Wisconsin; United States
- Frequency: 100.9 MHz
- Branding: WRCO FM 100.9

Programming
- Format: Full Service, Country
- Affiliations: ABC News Radio; Milwaukee Brewers Radio Network; Packers Radio Network

Ownership
- Owner: Civic Media; (Civic Media, Inc.)
- Sister stations: WRCE, WMDX, WRPQ, WLCX

History
- First air date: 1965
- Call sign meaning: Richland County

Technical information
- Licensing authority: FCC
- Facility ID: 56312
- Class: C3
- ERP: 8,400 watts
- HAAT: 170.4 meters (559 ft)
- Transmitter coordinates: 43°18′55.50″N 90°25′34.60″W

Links
- Public license information: Public file; LMS
- Webcast: Listen Live
- Website: wrco.com

WRCO-FM (100.9 MHz, "Country & Community") is a radio station broadcasting a country music format. Licensed to Richland Center, Wisconsin, United States, the station is currently owned by Sage Weil, through licensee Civic Media, Inc.; it features programming from ABC News Radio.
