= WCLO =

- Janesville, Wisconsin; United States
- Broadcast area: Janesville, Wisconsin
- Frequency: 1230 kHz
- Branding: Newsradio 1230 & 92.7

Programming
- Format: News–talk
- Affiliations: USA Radio News; Westwood One Sports Network; Premiere Networks; Radio America; Westwood One; Milwaukee Brewers Radio Network; Milwaukee Bucks Radio Network; Packers Radio Network

Ownership
- Owner: Benjamin Thompson

History
- First air date: 1925
- Call sign meaning: Camp Lake Oaks, a subdivision in Camp Lake, Wisconsin

Technical information
- Licensing authority: FCC
- Facility ID: 61390
- Class: C
- Power: 1,000 watts unlimited
- Transmitter coordinates: 42°39′35″N 89°2′32″W
- Translator: 92.7 W224DE (Janesville)

Links
- Public license information: Public file; LMS
- Webcast: Listen live
- Website: www.wclo.com

WCLO (1230 AM) is a radio station broadcasting a news–talk format. Licensed to Janesville, Wisconsin, United States, the station serves the Janesville area. The station is owned by Benjamin Thompson and features programming from USA Radio News, Westwood One Sports Network, Premiere Networks, Radio America, and Westwood One.

== History ==
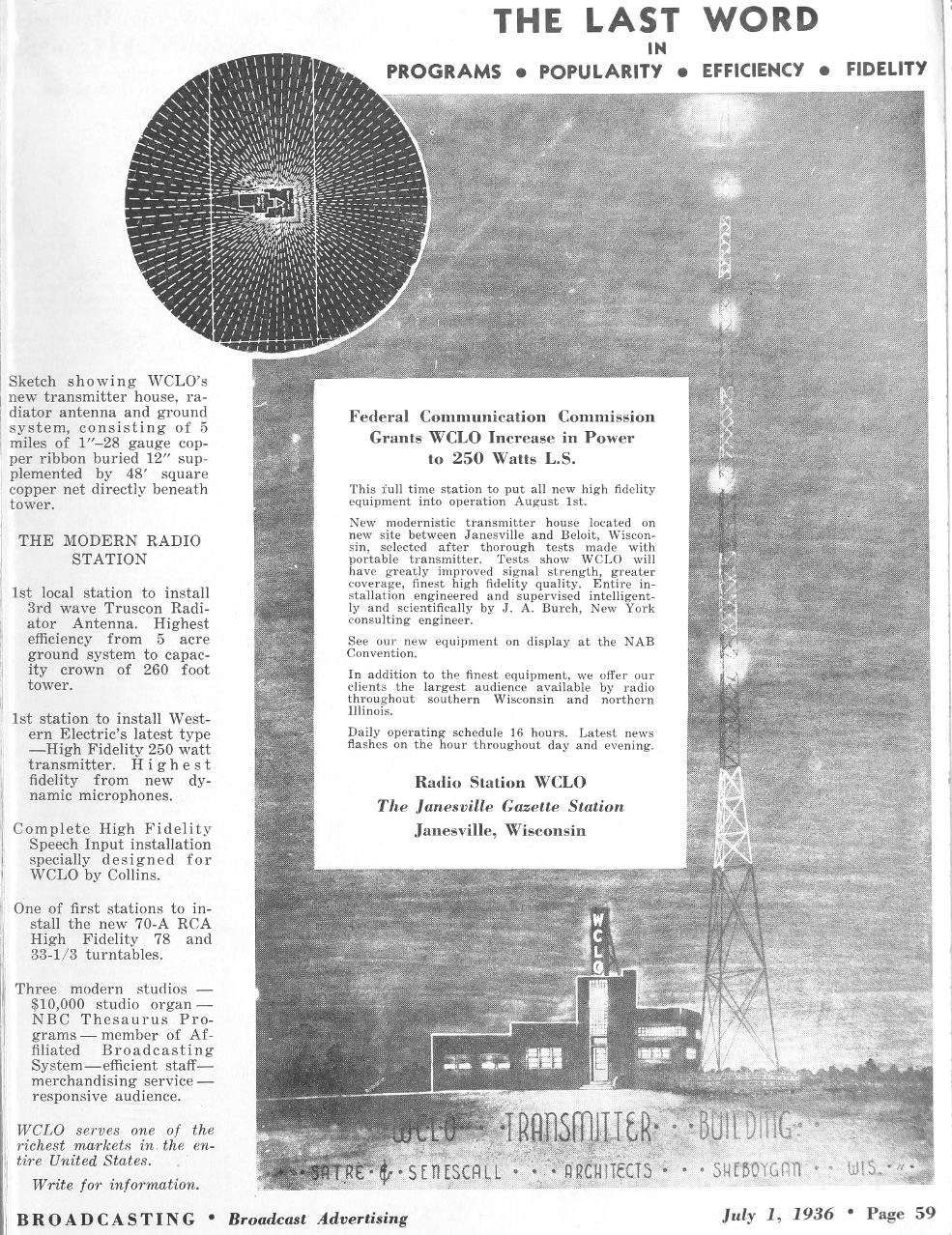
Station advertisement (1936)

WCLO was originally licensed on August 24, 1925, to C. E. Whitmore, broadcasting from Camp Lake, west of Kenosha. Its owner at that time was a real estate development company with a project called Camp Lake Oaks, from which came the call letters assigned by the government to the small 50-watt station. WCLO's first transmitting station had twin towers on County Highway A, four miles east of Janesville. For its first 11 years, the station operated as a daytime station, signing on at local sunrise and signing off at sunset.

After three years of operating at Camp Lake, WCLO was moved by its licensees to Kenosha.

Following the establishment of the Federal Radio Commission (FRC), stations were initially issued a series of temporary authorizations starting on May 3, 1927. In addition, they were informed that if they wanted to continue operating, they needed to file a formal license application by January 15, 1928, as the first step in determining whether they met the new "public interest, convenience, or necessity" standard. On May 25, 1928, the FRC issued General Order 32, which notified 164 stations, including WCLO, that "From an examination of your application for future license it does not find that public interest, convenience, or necessity would be served by granting it." However, the station successfully convinced the commission that it should remain licensed.

On November 11, 1928, the FRC made a major reallocation of station transmitting frequencies, as part of a reorganization resulting from its implementation of General Order 40. WCLO was assigned to 1200 kHz.

In 1929, a group of Kenosha businessmen organized the WCLO Radio Corp., acquiring the rights to the station and receiving permission to increase its power to 100 watts. The WCLO Radio Corp. operated the station in Kenosha for a year.

On February 25, 1930, an agreement was reached transferring WCLO's license and equipment to Harry H. Bliss of Janesville the owner of The Gazette. His son, Sidney H. Bliss, became president and general manager of the new venture. Studios were constructed within the Gazette building on the third floor. The station began broadcasting on August 1, 1930. Wisconsin Governor Walter J. Kohler Sr. headed the list of guest speakers on the inaugural program. Broadcasts from the Gazette were supplemented by remote control broadcasts that reached listeners throughout southern Wisconsin.

On March 29, 1941, the station moved from 1200 kHz to 1230 kHz, its location ever since, as part of the implementation of the North American Regional Broadcasting Agreement.

=== Past personalities ===
- Pat Alan, newscaster (1945–1946)
