= WKGL-FM =

- Loves Park, Illinois; United States
- Broadcast area: Rockford, Illinois and Vicinity
- Frequency: 96.7 MHz
- Branding: 96.7 The Eagle

Programming
- Format: Classic rock
- Affiliations: Compass Media Networks; United Stations Radio Networks

Ownership
- Owner: Townsquare Media; (Townsquare License, LLC)
- Sister stations: WROK, WXXQ, WZOK

History
- First air date: 1964 (as WLUV-FM)
- Former call signs: WLUV-FM (1964–2000); WKMQ-FM (2000–2004)
- Call sign meaning: "Eagle" (branding)

Technical information
- Licensing authority: FCC
- Facility ID: 38638
- Class: A
- ERP: 2,200 watts
- HAAT: 168 meters (551 ft)
- Transmitter coordinates: 42.363°N 89.135°W

Links
- Public license information: Public file; LMS
- Webcast: Listen live
- Website: 967theeagle.net

WKGL-FM (96.7 MHz "96.7 The Eagle") is a radio station licensed to Loves Park, Illinois, serving the Rockford, Illinois area with a classic rock format. It is under ownership of Townsquare Media. Prior to being WKGL-FM, the station had an oldies format as WKMQ-FM and a country format as WLUV-FM.

On August 30, 2013, a deal was announced in which Townsquare would acquire 53 Cumulus Media stations, including WKGL-FM, for $238 million. The deal was part of Cumulus' acquisition of Dial Global; Townsquare and Dial Global were both controlled by Oaktree Capital Management. The sale to Townsquare was completed on November 14, 2013.
