= WXXQ =

- Freeport, Illinois; United States
- Broadcast area: Rockford and Vicinity
- Frequency: 98.5 MHz
- Branding: Q98.5

Programming
- Format: Country
- Affiliations: Compass Media Networks

Ownership
- Owner: Townsquare Media; (Townsquare License, LLC)
- Sister stations: WKGL-FM, WROK, WZOK

History
- First air date: April 11, 1965 (as WFRL-FM)
- Former call signs: WFRL-FM (1965); WELL-FM (1965–1974); WFRL-FM (1974–1979)

Technical information
- Licensing authority: FCC
- Facility ID: 63137
- Class: B1
- ERP: 11,000 watts
- HAAT: 150 meters (490 ft)
- Transmitter coordinates: 42.280017°N 89.333067°W

Links
- Public license information: Public file; LMS
- Webcast: Listen live
- Website: www.q985online.com

WXXQ (98.5 FM, "Q98.5") is an American radio station serving the Rockford, Illinois, area with a country music format. WXXQ broadcasts on FM frequency 98.5 MHz and is owned by Townsquare Media.

== History ==
Logo under previous slogan

WXXQ was originally WFRL-FM, with sister station WFRL, sharing studios that were located in Freeport, Illinois. Prior to country, the station ran a Top 40 format for a time.

Previous logo

On August 30, 2013, a deal was announced in which Townsquare would acquire 53 Cumulus Media stations, including WXXQ, for $238 million. The deal was part of Cumulus' acquisition of Dial Global; Townsquare and Dial Global were both controlled by Oaktree Capital Management. The Cumulus transaction was completed in November 2013.
