= WTLX =

Radio station in Monona–Madison, Wisconsin

Coordinates: 43.134°N 89.399°W

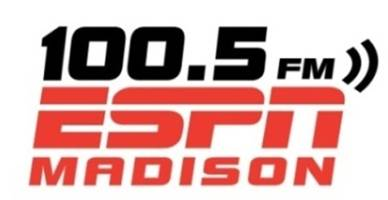
- Monona, Wisconsin; United States
- Broadcast area: Madison metropolitan area
- Frequency: 100.5 MHz
- Branding: 100.5 FM ESPN

Programming
- Format: Sports
- Affiliations: ESPN Radio; Milwaukee Brewers; Milwaukee Bucks; Madison Mallards

Ownership
- Owner: Good Karma Sports
- Sister stations: WTMJ, WBEV, WBEV-FM, WKTI, WMVP

History
- First air date: July 16, 1990
- Former call signs: WWAM (1989–1990); WYKY (1990–1998)
- Call sign meaning: Former hot talk format

Technical information
- Licensing authority: FCC
- Facility ID: 4477
- Class: A
- ERP: 6,000 watts
- HAAT: 55 meters (180 ft)

Links
- Public license information: Public file; LMS
- Webcast: Listen live
- Website: espnwisconsin.com

WTLX (100.5 FM, "100.5 FM ESPN") is a commercial radio station licensed to Monona, Wisconsin, United States, and serving the Madison metropolitan area. The station is owned by Good Karma Sports, and runs a sports format as an affiliate of ESPN Radio. It shares most programming with Milwaukee-based WKTI-FM, identifying jointly on air as "ESPN Wisconsin".

The transmitter is off Tower Road on the water tower at the Mendota Mental Health Institute in Madison. The studios are in the SPARK Building on East Washington Avenue in downtown Madison.

== History ==
The station first signed on the air on July 16, 1990. The original call sign was WWAM and its city of license was Columbus, Wisconsin. In 1990 it changed call letters to WYKY, airing an adult contemporary music format as "Key 100.5." Then in 1998, it changed to WTLX with a "hot talk" format as "100X." The 100X schedule included The Howard Stern Show and The Don and Mike Show, along with sports programming from Sporting News Radio and later Fox Sports Radio.

By the mid-2000s, the station eliminated the hot talk and concentrated on an all-sports format, with both national and Wisconsin-based programming. On January 1, 2009, WTLX became a network affiliate of ESPN Radio, whose programming had been airing in Madison on rival station 1070 WTSO. Along with that affiliation change, WTLX's city of license moved from Columbus, 27 miles (43 km) northeast of Madison, to the Madison suburb of Monona.

According to Jason Wilde on an episode of "Wilde & Tausch" from December 21, 2021, the radio studio when he joined ESPN Madison was located on Regent Street under the Regent Apartments. The address was 1402 Regent Street in Madison, a block east of Camp Randall Stadium. The same episode of "Wilde & Tausch" also mentions that previous to Pinckney Street the radio studio had been located at the WISC-TV studios at 7025 Raymond Road on the southwest side of Madison. Since January 2022, the station has operated out of the American Family Insurance SPARK Building located on E. Washington Ave in downtown Madison.

In December 2024, Good Karma announced that Milwaukee Brewers baseball broadcasts would move from rival sports station WOZN 1670 AM to WTLX. The move would take effect with the 2025 Major League Baseball season. WTMJ 620 AM in Milwaukee, is the flagship station on the Milwaukee Brewers Radio Network.

== Programming ==
Local programming includes KBN with Kyle Wallace, Ben Brust, and Brad Nortman. Rutledge and Hamilton with Jim Rutledge and Olympic Gold medalist Matt Hamilton, and Wilde & Tausch, hosted by three-time Wisconsin sportswriter of the year Jason Wilde and former Wisconsin Badger and Green Bay Packer Mark Tauscher. Specialty programming includes Wisconsin College GameDay, Mr. Irrelevant with Alex Strouf, and Prep Mania.

Live sports programming on WTLX features Milwaukee Bucks basketball and Milwaukee Brewers baseball. The station airs select local high school sports play-by-play. The station also carries national sports play-by-play from ESPN Radio, including NBA basketball, Major League Baseball, and college football games.
