= WGFB =

Coordinates: 42.367°N 89.087°W

- Rockton, Illinois; United States
- Broadcast area: Rockford, Illinois
- Frequency: 103.1 MHz
- Branding: B103

Programming
- Format: Hot adult contemporary

Ownership
- Owner: Mid-West Family Broadcasting; (Long Nine, Inc.)
- Sister stations: WNTA, WRTB, WXRX

History
- First air date: March 1963
- Former call signs: WBEL-FM (1963–1967); WRWC (1967-2000)

Technical information
- Licensing authority: FCC
- Facility ID: 73975
- Class: A
- ERP: 2,400 watts
- HAAT: 160 meters (520 ft)

Links
- Public license information: Public file; LMS
- Webcast: Listen live
- Website: www.b103fm.com

WGFB (103.1 FM) is a radio station broadcasting a hot adult contemporary format. Licensed to Rockton, Illinois, the station serves the Rockford area. WGFB is owned by Mid-West Family Broadcasting.

== History ==
The station began broadcasting in March 1963, and held the call sign WBEL-FM. It was a sister station to WBEL 1380, and simulcast its programming. The station was originally licensed to South Beloit, Illinois. In 1967, the station's call sign was changed to WRWC. In 1971, the station's city of license was changed to Rockton, Illinois. In the 1970s, the station aired a format consisting of beautiful music and big band music. The station continued airing a beautiful music format into the 1980s.

By 1984, the station's format had been changed to adult contemporary. In the 1990s, the station aired a soft AC format, and was branded "Lite 103". The station aired Delilah evenings. In April 2000, the station's call sign was changed to WGFB, and the station's format was shifted to mainstream AC. The station was branded "B 103", with the slogan "Today's Lite Rock". The station continued to air Delilah evenings. By 2006, Delilah was replaced in the evenings with John Tesh.

On December 26, 2022, after the conclusion of their annual wall to wall Christmas music, WGFB shifted their format to hot AC, dropping their AC format after 22 years.
