= Northern Public Radio =

Public radio network serving northern Illinois

- Headquarters: DeKalb, Illinois
- Branding: Northern Public Radio

Programming
- Format: Public radio
- Affiliations: NPR, PRX, APM

Ownership
- Owner: Northern Illinois University

History
- Launch date: 1954 (WNIU sign-on); 1998 (network organized)

Links
- Webcast: Listen live
- Website: northernpublicradio.org

Northern Public Radio is the public radio service of Northern Illinois University. It consists of two full-powered FM stations and three lower-powered satellites, all affiliated with National Public Radio. The group is headquartered at the NIU Broadcast Center on NIU's campus on North 1st Street in DeKalb, Illinois, with additional studios at Riverfront Museum Park on North Main Street in Rockford. Although DeKalb is part of the Chicago radio market, Northern Public Radio serves as the NPR member for the Rockford market.

== Stations ==
WNIJ (89.5 FM) in DeKalb primarily airs news and talk programming from NPR, with World Cafe, Echoes and locally produced blues music programming at night and Saturday afternoons. BBC World Service airs overnight. The station's programming is also simulcast on repeaters WNIE in Freeport (89.1 FM), WNIQ in Sterling (91.5 FM) and WNIW in La Salle (91.3 FM).

WNIU (90.5 FM) in Rockford airs classical music 24 hours a day using the syndicated classical music service Classical 24, and operates a low-powered translator at 105.7 in Rockford (W289AB) to improve its coverage in the northern part of the city.

Location	Frequency	Call sign	Facility ID	ERP	HAAT	Class	Transmitter coordinates	Format	FCC info
DeKalb	89.5 FM	WNIJ	49550	50,000 watts	128 meters (420 ft)	B	42°0′55.1″N 89°0′7.3″W	News/talk, AAA	LMS
Rockford	90.5 FM	WNIU	49545	50,000 watts	112 meters (367 ft)	B	42°0′55.1″N 89°0′7.3″W	Classical music	LMS
Freeport	89.1 FM	WNIE	49555	6,000 watts	110 meters (360 ft)	B1	42°18′45.1″N 89°35′38.4″W	News/talk, AAA	LMS
Sterling	91.5 FM	WNIQ	49557	2,400 watts	100 meters (330 ft)	A	41°53′52.1″N 89°36′20.4″W	News/talk, AAA	LMS
La Salle	91.3 FM	WNIW	49556	36,000 watts	110 meters (360 ft)	B	41°24′47.1″N 89°16′34.4″W	News/talk, AAA	LMS

== History ==
Northern Public Radio began in 1954, when WNIU signed on as a 10-watt station on 89.5 FM that barely covered the immediate area around the campus of what was then Northern Illinois State College (which became NIU in 1957). It aired classical music along with lectures and announcements of campus events. In 1964, it expanded its transmitter power to 2,500 watts, boosting its coverage area to all of DeKalb County. At the same time, it began emphasizing news programming.

WNIU was a charter member of National Public Radio in 1971, and was one of the 90 stations that carried the initial broadcast of All Things Considered. In 1979, WNIU got permission to boost its power to 50,000 watts. This more than doubled the coverage area of the station, and brought its signal to Rockford for the first time, albeit with only grade B coverage.

In 1988, WNIU moved its transmitter from De Kalb to Lindenwood, which gave it a city-grade signal to Rockford. Previously, Rockford had been the only major city in Illinois without city-grade coverage from an NPR station; the only sources of NPR programming in the area were grade B signals from WNIU and Wisconsin Public Radio's Madison outlets.

NIU had wanted a second frequency for some time, and finally got it in 1991 when WNIJ signed on at 90.5 FM in Rockford. WNIU became a full-time classical music station, while WNIJ was a more traditional full-service NPR station.

In 1998, the two stations swapped frequencies, with WNIJ moving to the stronger 89.5 frequency while WNIU moved to 90.5. This move was made so more people could hear WNIJ's news and talk programming. WNIJ also scaled back its jazz programming to nights only. That same year, WNIW and WNIQ signed on. WNIE followed in 1999. Listeners in the latter three stations' coverage areas had only gotten spotty coverage from WNIU or WNIJ, depending on the location. Originally, the three repeaters simulcast WNIJ during the day and WNIU at night, but problems with switching equipment forced them to simulcast WNIJ 24 hours a day.
