= WRTB =

- Winnebago, Illinois; United States
- Broadcast area: Rockford, Illinois
- Frequency: 95.3 MHz
- Branding: 95.3 The Bull

Programming
- Format: Country

Ownership
- Owner: Mid-West Family Broadcasting; (Long Nine, Inc.)
- Sister stations: WXRX, WNTA, WGFB

History
- First air date: 1970
- Former call signs: WRVI (1967–1974); WYFE (1974–1985); WKMQ (1985–2000); WYHY (2000–2006)

Technical information
- Licensing authority: FCC
- Facility ID: 59620
- Class: A
- ERP: 1,250 watts
- HAAT: 156 meters (512 ft)
- Transmitter coordinates: 42.291°N 89.164°W

Links
- Public license information: Public file; LMS
- Webcast: Listen live
- Website: www.thebullrockford.com

WRTB (95.3 FM, "The Bull") is a country music radio station licensed to serve Winnebago, Illinois, and serving the Rockford market. Before flipping to country, WRTB used the Bob FM format from August 1, 2006, to February 21, 2014.

== History ==
The stations call letters were WRVI beginning in 1967, then WYFE-FM from 1974 to 1985. Its sister station was WYFE (1150 AM), now silent. Together they were known locally as "The Great Ones...AM 1150 and FM 95" airing 'gold' formats.

Its call letters were changed to WKMQ in 1985, and flipped its format to adult contemporary under the branding "KMQ". Its adult contemporary music format lasted until 1989 when it flipped to a popular oldies format. In 2000, the oldies format was changed to classic hits as Y95 and call letters WYHY. The first lineup of WYHY featured Riley O Neil and Sky Drysdale, within the first ratings period the station went to #1. From 2002 to 2003 the station evolved into a classic rock format, and syndicated Bob & Tom moved from sister WXRX. In the mid-2000s following the sale to Maverick Media, the station changed formats again to Bob FM and call letters to WRTB.

On February 21, 2014, at 3:00 pm, WRTB changed their format to country, branded as "95.3 The Bull". The last song on 95.3 Bob FM was Talk To Ya Later by The Tubes, while the first song on 95.3 The Bull was How Do You Like Me Now?! by Toby Keith.

== Awards and nominations ==
In 2024, WRTB was nominated for "Radio Station of the Year (Small Market)" at 59th Annual Academy of Country Music Awards.
