= WQLF =

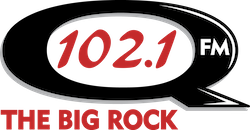
- Lena, Illinois; United States
- Broadcast area: Freeport, Illinois
- Frequency: 102.1 MHz
- Branding: The Big Rock Q102

Programming
- Format: Classic rock

Ownership
- Owner: Big Radio
- Sister stations: WBGR-FM, WEKZ, WFRL, WFPS

History
- First air date: August 2, 2002

Technical information
- Licensing authority: FCC
- Facility ID: 59674
- Class: A
- ERP: 5,200 watts
- HAAT: 107 meters (351 ft)
- Transmitter coordinates: 42°20′31″N 89°48′21″W

Links
- Public license information: Public file; LMS
- Webcast: Listen live
- Website: bigradio.fm

WQLF (102.1 FM; "Q102") is a radio station broadcasting a classic rock format. Licensed to Lena, Illinois, the station serves the Freeport area, and is owned by Big Radio.

== History ==
The allocation for 102.1 in Lena was added by the Federal Communications Commission in 1993; the construction permit to build a station there was awarded in 2000 to Lena Radio, Inc., which was controlled by Sally McMahon. Lena Radio would sell the WQLF permit to Thompson & Spielman, a partnership led by Scott Thompson, in 2002. It went on the air August 2, 2002, as "Hit Radio Q102.1", with a classic rock format. Lena Radio Broadcasting was a subsidiary of Green County Broadcasting, owner of WEKZ and WEKZ-FM in Monroe; the station was operated from the WEKZ studios, with Thompson comparing its format to "the WLS of the '70s".
