= WBEV (AM) =

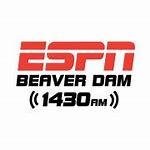
- Beaver Dam, Wisconsin; United States
- Broadcast area: Dodge County and surrounding area
- Frequency: 1430 kHz
- Branding: 1430 ESPN

Programming
- Format: Sports
- Affiliations: ESPN Radio; Beaver Dam Golden Beavers; Milwaukee Brewers baseball

Ownership
- Owner: Good Karma Sports; (Good Karma Broadcasting, LLC)
- Sister stations: WBEV-FM

History
- First air date: April 24, 1951
- Call sign meaning: Beaver

Technical information
- Licensing authority: FCC
- Facility ID: 4475
- Class: B
- Power: 1,000 watts
- Transmitter coordinates: 43°25′43.00″N 88°53′33.00″W

Links
- Public license information: Public file; LMS
- Webcast: Listen live
- Website: dailydodge.com

WBEV (1430 AM) is a commercial radio station broadcasting a sports radio format. Licensed to Beaver Dam, Wisconsin, United States, the station is currently owned by Good Karma Sports.

== History ==
WBEV originally signed on as a daytime-only station on April 24, 1951, and added nighttime service in December 1979. The station first ran a MOR format from the 1970s until 1984, and later adult contemporary for more than a decade beginning in 1984 and continued into the 1990s. Beginning in 1993, the station began adding news/talk programs into its lineup. Right when the 2000s rolled along, its music format was dropped and the station went into full-service brokered programming with news, talk, farm, and sports programs from ESPN Radio, as well as infomercial programming on both weekdays and weekends. In the 2010s, the station added an oldies music format to its brokered programming lineup.

On August 15, 2022, the station dropped its full-service brokered programming format and flipped to sports talk, retaining its ESPN Radio affiliation from its former full-service brokered programming lineup.

== Notable DJs ==
Notable people who worked for WBEV included Jack Horkheimer, the creator and host of Jack Horkheimer: Star Gazer; he began work at the station in 1953 at age 15.

Other persons of interest that have worked at WBEV include “Uncle” Bill McCollum, who started working at the station on July 4, 1964. Uncle Bill is the longtime host of the BarnShow, Dodge County’s premiere Polka radio show.

The station did a show from 6 PM to 12 AM 7 days a week called "The Nighttime Oldies Show". Chris Hansen was the full time DJ Monday through Friday for 2 years. He had worked at the station part time for 2 years, when acquiring the permanent spot from 1990 to 1992. He was hired part time at the age of 18 and full time at the age of 20. His father was in the Radio business, owning the Poynette, WI radio station WIBU AM 1240, where he obtained his first on-air part time position on Saturday nights as "Chris the Kid" at the age of 14. After WIBU, he worked in Waupun, WI at 99Q (WGGQ)/WLKE radio station part time starting at the age of 16. After working there 2 years, went to Beaver Dam part time for 2 years, then Full time for 2 years. After a falling out, he left the Beaver Dam radio station and worked part time at WPDR/WDDC in Portage, WI, then went to work for Solid 70's WMXF 96.3FM (Mix 96) under the program director Van Edwards (from WIBA 101.5 FM). After a year at mix 96, he started working for 94.9 FM Wolx at the same time. A year later the stations split, he stayed with WOLX for 5 years. When his 3rd child was born in January 2002, he left the radio field.

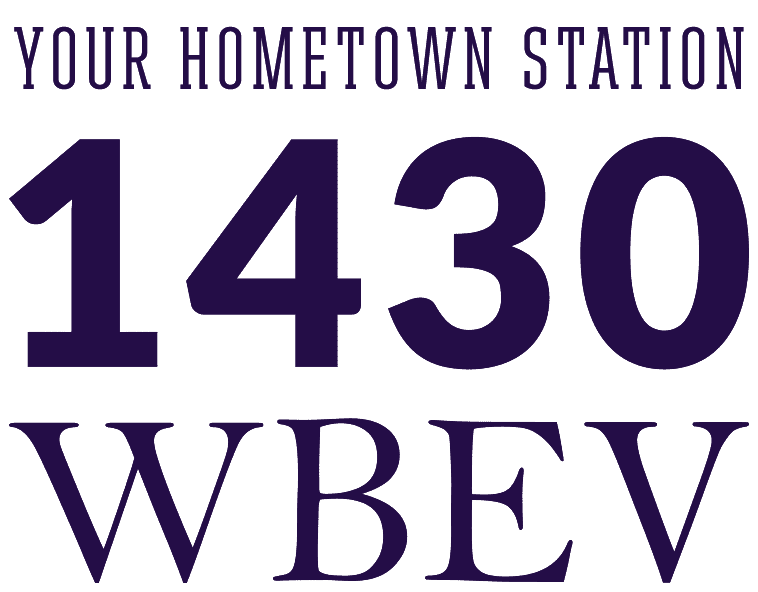
Former logo

On July 27, 2022, the station announced it would flip to sports as "ESPN 1430" on August 15 after a fifteen-day period of moving the station's programming to WXRO under the WBEV-FM call sign.
