= WEKZ (AM) =

- Monroe, Wisconsin; United States
- Broadcast area: Green County, Wisconsin
- Frequency: 1260 kHz
- Branding: "Big Country WEKZ"

Programming
- Format: Classic country
- Affiliations: ABC News Radio

Ownership
- Owner: Scott Thompson; (Big Radio)
- Sister stations: WBGR-FM, WFPS, WFRL, WQLF

History
- First air date: July 27, 1951

Technical information
- Licensing authority: FCC
- Facility ID: 25131
- Class: D
- Power: 1,000 watts day; 19 watts night
- Transmitter coordinates: 42°35′40″N 89°35′34″W
- Translator: 95.5 W238CB (Monroe)

Links
- Public license information: Public file; LMS
- Webcast: Listen Live
- Website: www.bigradio.fm

WEKZ (1260 kHz; "Big Country") is an AM radio station licensed to serve Monroe, Wisconsin, United States. The station is owned by Scott Thompson and the broadcast license is held by Big Radio. Their studios and transmitter are east of Monroe, at W4765 Radio Lane. WEKZ's programming is simulcast on translator station W238CB (95.5 FM).

Sister stations include WBGR-FM (93.7) licensed to Monroe, WFRL (1570 AM) and WFPS (92.1 FM) licensed to Freeport, Illinois, and WQLF (102.1 FM) licensed to Lena, Illinois.

WEKZ broadcasts a classic country music format, plus extensive local news and sports programming. The station was assigned the WEKZ call sign by the Federal Communications Commission.

== Translator ==
Broadcast translator for WEKZ
Call sign	Frequency	City of license	FID	ERP (W)	Class	Transmitter coordinates	FCC info
W238CB	95.5 FM	Monroe, Wisconsin	150566	250	D	42°34′36″N 89°41′34″W	LMS
