= WNTA =

- Rockford, Illinois; United States
- Broadcast area: Rockford, Illinois
- Frequency: 1330 kHz
- Branding: Sportsfan Radio 1330 & 97.1

Programming
- Format: Sports talk radio
- Affiliations: Fox Sports Radio; Chicago Bears; Rockford IceHogs

Ownership
- Owner: Mid-West Family Broadcasting; (Long Nine, Inc.)
- Sister stations: WGFB, WRTB, WXRX

History
- First air date: December 24, 1953; 72 years ago
- Former call signs: WRRR (1953–1982); WXTA (1982–1987); WYBR (1987–1988); WRRR (1988–1995)

Technical information
- Licensing authority: FCC
- Facility ID: 671
- Class: D
- Power: 1,000 watts (day); 91 watts (night)
- Transmitter coordinates: 42°13′32.08″N 89°2′49.37″W
- Translator: 97.1 W246DW (Rockford)

Links
- Public license information: Public file; LMS
- Webcast: Listen live

WNTA (1330 AM) is a radio station licensed to Rockford, Illinois, United States. It serves the Rockford/Stateline area, using a two tower directional antenna system on Sandy Hollow Road. The station's current format is sports. WNTA rebroadcasts on W246DW 97.1 FM and is owned by Mid-West Family Broadcasting.

== History ==
The station was assigned the call letters WRRR on December 24, 1953, which were changed to WXTA on September 23, 1982. On March 1, 1987, it changed its call sign to WYBR and on September 1, 1988, to WRRR. On September 18, 1995, the station became the current WNTA. The move came as RadioWorks consolidated the news and talk programming of the former WNTA (1150 AM) with WRRR's existing adult standards programming for nights and weekends; RadioWorks sought to operate one AM outlet and chose the superior 1330 facility with its better coverage of Rockford's east side.

On November 11, 2011, WNTA rebranded as "100.5 NTA FM".

On July 26, 2012, WNTA changed its format from news/talk to comedy, branded as "Funny 1330".

In April 2013, WNTA was sold to Mid-West Family Broadcasting along with its sister stations by Maverick Media. WNTA was promptly flipped to Spanish news & talk/full-service programming as "La Movida" on June 10 at 10 am. Much of the programming and personalities originate from sister station WLMV in Madison, Wisconsin.

On July 21, 2016, Midwest Family Broadcasting announced that WNTA would flip to sports talk as "Sports Fan 1330" on August 1. The station uses the Fox Sports Radio network. It also airs Chicago Bears football, as well as most games for the Northern Illinois Huskies and a locally produced weekly public affairs program on Sunday morning.

WNTA is also rebroadcast on FM translator station W246DW at 97.1 MHz.

== Translator ==
Call sign	Frequency	City of license	FID	ERP (W)	Class	Transmitter coordinates	FCC info
W246DW	97.1 FM	Rockford, Illinois	202364	250	D	42°22′2″N 89°5′13″W	LMS
