= WZOK =

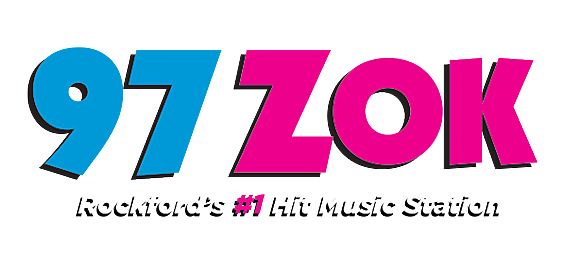
- Rockford, Illinois; United States
- Broadcast area: Rockford metropolitan area; Northwest Chicago suburbs
- Frequency: 97.5 MHz
- Branding: 97 Z-O-K

Programming
- Format: Top 40 (CHR)
- Affiliations: Compass Media Networks; United Stations Radio Networks; Westwood One

Ownership
- Owner: Townsquare Media; (Townsquare License, LLC)
- Sister stations: WKGL-FM; WROK; WXXQ

History
- First air date: 1949
- Former call signs: WROK-FM (1949–1976)
- Call sign meaning: Disambiguation of sister station WROK

Technical information
- Licensing authority: FCC
- Facility ID: 48986
- Class: B
- ERP: 50,000 watts
- HAAT: 137.7 meters (452 ft)
- Transmitter coordinates: 42.279185°N 89.037386°W

Links
- Public license information: Public file; LMS
- Webcast: Listen live
- Website: 97zokonline.com

WZOK (97.5 FM), branded as 97ZOK, is a radio station serving the Rockford, Illinois area with a top 40 (CHR) format. It is under ownership of Townsquare Media.

== History ==
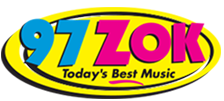
Previous version of logo

WROK-FM signed on the air in 1949, and in 1976, the call letters changed to the current WZOK. In late 1980, WZOK changed their format from album-oriented rock to its current top 40/CHR format, and was the dominant CHR station in the Rockford metropolitan area, including portions of Northern Illinois such as Belvidere, Cherry Valley, DeKalb, and Woodstock, and portions of Southern Wisconsin such as Janesville and Beloit.

WZOK made national headlines in October 1981 after The Rolling Stones added a date in Rockford to their 1981 North American Tour after the station organized a petition drive asking the group to play a concert in the city. The show sold out the small Rockford MetroCentre, with 8,000 in attendance. $15 tickets were offered by the station through a separate lottery to those who had signed the petition.

The 97ZOK branding was introduced in Spring 1989. In September 1992, WZOK changed their format from top 40/CHR to rock adult contemporary, but 2 years later it went back to top 40/CHR.

On August 30, 2013, a deal was announced in which Townsquare would acquire 53 Cumulus Media stations, including WZOK, for $238 million. The deal was part of Cumulus' acquisition of Dial Global; Townsquare and Dial Global were both controlled by Oaktree Capital Management. The sale to Townsquare was completed on November 14.
