= WNIJ =

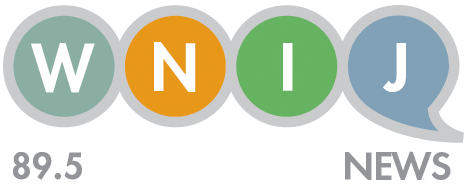
- DeKalb, Illinois; United States
- Frequency: 89.5 MHz
- Branding: Northern Public Radio

Programming
- Format: Public radio (news/talk, AAA)
- Affiliations: NPR; Public Radio Exchange; American Public Media

Ownership
- Owner: Northern Illinois University

History
- First air date: October 1954 (as WNIC at 91.1)
- Former call signs: WNIC (1954–1968); WNIU (1968–1997)
- Former frequencies: 91.1 MHz (1954–1965); 89.7 MHz (1965–1968)

Technical information
- Licensing authority: FCC
- Facility ID: 49550
- Class: B
- ERP: 50,000 watts
- HAAT: 128 meters (420 ft)
- Transmitter coordinates: 42.0153°N 89.0020°W

Links
- Public license information: Public file; LMS
- Webcast: Listen live
- Website: www.northernpublicradio.org

WNIJ (89.5 FM) is a radio station licensed to DeKalb, Illinois. The station is owned by Northern Illinois University, and is the flagship of Northern Public Radio's news/talk network, airing NPR news and adult album alternative music programming.
