= WFPS =

- Freeport, Illinois; United States
- Broadcast area: Northwest Illinois
- Frequency: 92.1 MHz
- Branding: Kickin' Country K92

Programming
- Format: Contemporary country

Ownership
- Owner: Big Radio
- Sister stations: WBGR-FM, WEKZ, WFRL, WQLF

History
- First air date: November 1, 1970
- Former call signs: WACI (1970–1982); WFPS-FM (1982–2002)

Technical information
- Licensing authority: FCC
- Facility ID: 22647
- Class: A
- ERP: 3,600 watts
- HAAT: 129 meters (423 ft)
- Transmitter coordinates: 42°19′41″N 89°43′30″W

Links
- Public license information: Public file; LMS
- Webcast: Listen live
- Website: www.bigradio.fm

WFPS is an FM radio station in Freeport, Illinois, operating on an assigned frequency of 92.1 megahertz as authorized by the Federal Communications Commission. It shares studios with sister WFRL at 834 North Tower Road, northeast of Freeport. Their transmitter site is west of town, on Highway 20.

== History ==
WFPS signed on the air on November 1, 1970, under the call letters of WACI with an effective radiated power of 3,000 watts. The station was started by Ruth and F.X. Mahoney. The studios were in a double wide trailer custom designed for a radio station located on highway 20, five miles west of Freeport. Its format was easy listening music. The staff consisted of Ruth Mahoney, Dick Carroll, Al Newman, Lee Newman, Lee Jackson, Mike Dierdorf, Barb Cremer, John Shepler, Jim Runkle, Helen Hawkins, Bob Spencer, John Byers and Sherwin Williams (not the paint guy).

In the summer of 1972 WACI was sold to Bob Barry and Bill James from Milwaukee. When the sale of the station was approved the format changed to a top 40 format. The station sounded very much like Milwaukee radio station WOKY; Bob Barry was that station's morning DJ. Among the DJ's were Joe Benson, Scott Bell, Jay Allan Reese, John Q, Mike Raub, Chris O'Brien and others.

Joe Benson went on to bigger and better jobs as a DJ after leaving WACI in the summer of 1974. He worked at several stations in the Milwaukee market and eventually ended up in Los Angeles and was formerly the mid-day DJ on 100.3 The Sound KSWD and is the host of the national syndicated show "Off The Record".

When Bill James died in 1973 the station was sold to P.J. Broderick with another silent partner. The station continued with its Top 40 format until the station was sold to Dick Weis in December 1981. Dick Weis did not like the connotation "WACKY" so the call letters were changed to WFPS and the format changed to an adult contemporary format in the fall of 1982. WFPS changed its format to oldies in May 1987. Milwaukee radio legend Pat Shanahan worked at the station in the 1980s. Dick Weis owned the station until he became the mayor of Freeport, Illinois.

In the spring of 1989 the station was again sold to a group of four investors (Friends Communications). The four investors included Chuck Brooks, a radio sales representative from Chicago; his brother, Mick Brooks, a dentist from Youngstown, Ohio, Bob Elliot, a radio consultant from Atlanta, and Robert Guererro, a real estate developer from New Jersey. Despite having no previous experience in the radio industry, Mick Brooks served as the station's general manager. The format switched back to adult contemporary with the change of ownership. The move backfired as Brooks struggled with staffing issues and financial problems and alienated many of the locals.

On November 1, 1995, the 25th anniversary of the station, WFPS was again sold to Chuck Mills, an investor from Wisconsin. He held on to the station for six months before an offer was presented to him which he could not turn down. The station was again sold in the summer of 1996 to Mike Weckerly. Shortly after Weckerly purchased WFPS, he moved the station out of the trailer it had been broadcasting from for 26 years into a real building that also housed WFRL on Tower Road east of Freeport. It was in August 1996 when WFPS got its first taste of digital automation using Scott Studios.

Mike sold the stations in May 1998 to Radio Works, a corporate group from Rockford, Illinois. The station switched from its adult contemporary format to "Country Legends" in May 2001. In 2005 Radio Works sold its stations in Rockford and Freeport to Maverick Media.

On June 1, 2006, the FCC approved the sale of WFPS and WFRL from Maverick Media to Green County Broadcasting, owner of WQLF in Lena, Illinois, and WEKZ AM–FM in Monroe, Wisconsin. The current format of WFPS is new country.
