= WRCE (AM) =

Radio station in Richland Center, Wisconsin

- Richland Center, Wisconsin; United States
- Broadcast area: Richland County, Wisconsin
- Frequency: 1450 kHz
- Branding: WRCE Local News and Timeless Hits

Programming
- Language: English
- Format: Full service oldies
- Affiliations: ABC News Radio; Milwaukee Brewers; Wisconsin Badgers

Ownership
- Owner: Civic Media; (Civic Media, Inc.)
- Sister stations: WRCO-FM, WRPQ, WMDX, WLCX

History
- First air date: 1949; 77 years ago
- Former call signs: WRCO (1949–2022)
- Call sign meaning: Richland Center

Technical information
- Licensing authority: FCC
- Facility ID: 22793
- Class: C
- Power: 1,000 watts
- Transmitter coordinates: 43°18′58″N 90°22′39″W
- Translator: 107.7 W299CD (Richland Center)

Links
- Public license information: Public file; LMS
- Webcast: Listen live
- Website: wrce.fm

WRCE (1450 kHz, "WRCE Local News and Timeless Hits") is an AM radio station broadcasting a full service oldies format. Licensed to Richland Center, Wisconsin, United States, the station is currently owned by Civic Media, through licensee Civic Media, Inc.

In September 2022, WRCE (formerly WRCO-AM) changed its format from standards to talk as "News from the Center". WRCE covers local high school sports play by play and is an affiliate of the Wisconsin Badgers football and basketball radio networks. One of the first interviews on the new format was an interview of longtime local politician Dale Schultz.

On May 4, 2026, WRCE changed their format from progressive talk to full service oldies.
