= WBEV-FM =

- Beaver Dam, Wisconsin; United States
- Broadcast area: Dodge County and surrounding area
- Frequency: 95.3 MHz
- Branding: 95.3 WBEV

Programming
- Format: Full-service and oldies
- Affiliations: Westwood One; NASCAR racing Green Bay Packers football Milwaukee Bucks basketball Wisconsin Badgers football

Ownership
- Owner: Good Karma Sports
- Sister stations: WBEV

History
- First air date: August 1, 1968
- Former call signs: WBEV-FM (1968–1976); WXRO (1976–2022)

Technical information
- Licensing authority: FCC
- Facility ID: 4474
- Class: A
- ERP: 6,000 watts
- HAAT: 100 meters (330 ft)
- Transmitter coordinates: 43°28′9.00″N 88°49′32.00″W

Links
- Public license information: Public file; LMS
- Webcast: Listen live
- Website: dailydodge.com

WBEV-FM (95.3 MHz) is a radio station broadcasting a full-service oldies music format. Licensed to Beaver Dam, Wisconsin, United States, the station is currently owned by Good Karma Sports.

== History ==
From its sign-on in 1968 until 1976, WBEV-FM simulcast the programming of WBEV 1430. In 1976, the station call letters were changed to WXRO and it began airing the Drake Chenault "Great American Country" automated format. On July 12, 2019, the then-WXRO changed formats from country to hot adult contemporary, branded as "95X".

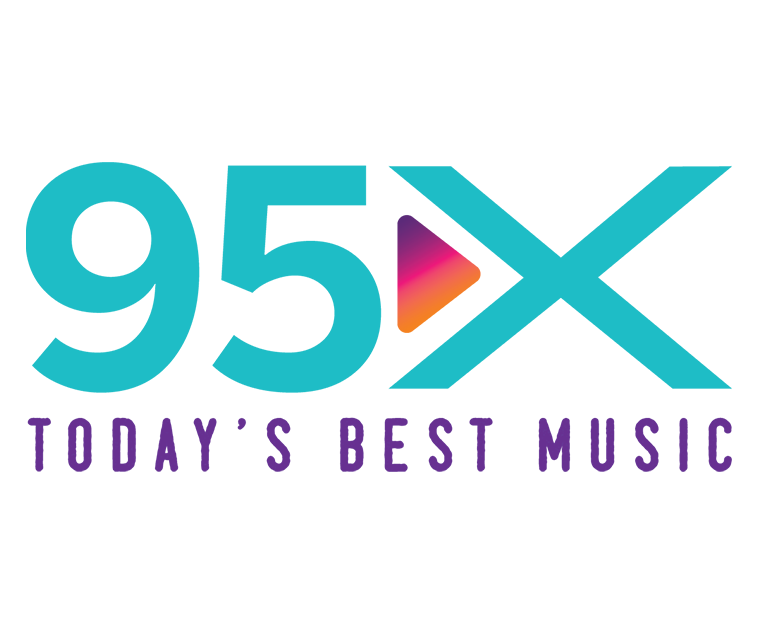
Logo as 95X

On August 1, 2022, WXRO flipped to full-service oldies as a simulcast of WBEV under the WBEV-FM call sign, with the AM station to flip to sports on August 15.
