= WROK (AM) =

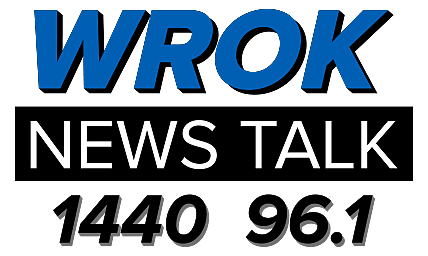
- Rockford, Illinois; United States
- Broadcast area: North Central Illinois
- Frequency: 1440 kHz
- Branding: News Talk 1440 and 96.1

Programming
- Format: News/talk
- Affiliations: Fox News Radio; Compass Media Networks; Premiere Networks; Radio America; Salem Radio Network; Westwood One

Ownership
- Owner: Townsquare Media; (Townsquare License, LLC)
- Sister stations: WKGL-FM; WXXQ; WZOK

History
- First air date: 1923
- Former call signs: KFLV (1923–1933)
- Call sign meaning: Rockford

Technical information
- Licensing authority: FCC
- Facility ID: 48987
- Class: B
- Power: 5,000 watts day; 270 watts night
- Transmitter coordinates: 42°16′45.07″N 89°2′15.38″W
- Translator: 96.1 W241DF (Rockford)

Links
- Public license information: Public file; LMS
- Webcast: Listen live
- Website: 1440wrok.com

WROK (1440 kHz) is an American news/talk AM radio station in Rockford, Illinois. It is owned by Townsquare Media. The station is licensed by the Federal Communications Commission (FCC) to serve Winnebago County, Illinois. WROK rebroadcasts on FM translator station W241DF at 96.1 MHz.

== Programming ==
The station features America in the Morning with John Trout, followed by Riley O'Neil for the morning drive-time broadcast. The Michael Koolidge Show airs after Riley O'Neil's morning show. Other syndicated programming includes The Sean Hannity Show, The Mark Levin Show, The Larry Elder Show, "The Chris Plante show", The "Clay Travis and Buck Sexton show" and Red Eye Radio.

Weekends feature This Weekend: America's First News with Gordon Deal, The Kim Komando Show, The Pete McMurray Show, Navigating Retirement, The Illini Guys, The Money Pit, Made in America, Live on Sunday Night, It's Bill Cunningham, Viewpoints, Eye on Illinois, Stateline Sports Hour, Saturday Morning Stateline and some Sunday morning religious programming from 7:00-9:00 AM.

WROK broadcasts Chicago White Sox baseball, University of Illinois football and basketball, and selected NFL games during the regular season.

== History ==
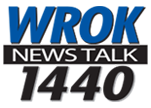
Logo before translator sign on

WROK was a very popular Top 40 music station in Rockford during the 1970s. Sister station WZOK carries on the Top 40 heritage, although that station's format has shifted toward hot adult contemporary in recent years.

The WROK callsign was used in the 1996 movie Down Periscope. During the scene where Nitro (Toby Huss) is making a call fingering wire connections to Admiral Graham (Bruce Dern) for Captain Dodge (Kelsey Grammer) Nitro passes the phone to Captain Dodge. Captain Dodge is then heard saying "Stairway to Heaven, Led Zeppelin, 1971." He passes the phone back to Nitro saying he answered the WROK question of the day, followed by "Now get me Admiral Graham."

On August 30, 2013, a deal was announced in which Townsquare would acquire 53 Cumulus Media stations, including WROK, for $238 million. The deal was part of Cumulus' acquisition of Dial Global; Townsquare and Dial Global were both controlled by Oaktree Capital Management. The transaction was consummated effective November 14, 2013.

== Translator ==
Call sign	Frequency	City of license	FID	ERP (W)	Class	Transmitter coordinates	FCC info
W241DF	96.1 FM	Rockford, Illinois	202281	250	D	42°16′45.2″N 89°2′14.9″W	LMS
