= WBEL (AM) =

- South Beloit, Illinois; United States
- Broadcast area: Beloit–Janesville, Wisconsin
- Frequency: 1380 kHz
- Branding: The Beat 92.3/98.9

Programming
- Language: English
- Format: 1990s hits
- Affiliations: Compass Media Networks

Ownership
- Owner: Scott Thompson; (Big Radio)

History
- First air date: May 18, 1948
- Former call signs: WBEL (1948–1998); WTJK (1998–2014)
- Call sign meaning: "Beloit"

Technical information
- Licensing authority: FCC
- Facility ID: 58732
- Class: B
- Power: 5,000 watts
- Transmitter coordinates: 42°27′34.06″N 89°1′43.39″W
- Translators: 92.3 W222AU (Beloit, Wisconsin); 98.9 W255CZ (Janesville, Wisconsin)

Links
- Public license information: Public file; LMS
- Webcast: Listen live
- Website: www.mostly90s.com

WBEL (1380 kHz) is a 1990s hits AM radio station in South Beloit, Illinois, with studios in Janesville, Wisconsin. Established in 1948, the station is owned by Big Radio. Its programming is simulcast on translator stations W222AU (92.3 FM) in Beloit, Wisconsin, and W255CZ (98.9 FM) in Janesville.

== History ==
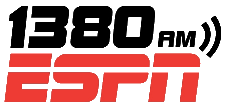
WTJK's logo as ESPN 1380

WBEL was signed on in 1948 by pioneer broadcaster and engineer Russ Salter. The station originally focused primarily on the local Beloit, Wisconsin, area, with an adult standards format and talk radio programming. In August 1998, the station made the switch to a sports radio format affiliated with ESPN Radio, changed its call sign to WTJK, "The Jock" and began marketing itself to the Janesville and Rockford, Illinois, areas. In 2001, Shelly Salter, CEO of Salter Broadcasting Company (SBC) and daughter of Russ Salter, sold the station to Good Karma Broadcasting. WTJK became the first ESPN Radio station for Good Karma Broadcasting.

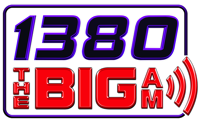
WBEL's logo as "The Big AM 1380"

In January 2014, Good Karma announced that it would sell WTJK and sister station WWHG (105.9 FM) to Scott Thompson's Big Radio; as part of the deal, the new owners began operating the stations through a local marketing agreement on February 1. Big Radio announced that it would decrease WTJK's ESPN Radio programming and add more local news; on April 14, 2014, the station converted to a talk radio format, featuring local programming (including drive time simulcasts with sister station WEKZ-FM) from 5 a.m. to 6 p.m.; ESPN Radio programming continued to be carried during nights and weekends. The sale was completed on May 12, 2014 at a purchase price of $1.45 million. On October 13, 2014, the call sign were changed back to WBEL.

On May 1, 2017, WBEL changed their format from news/talk to oldies. On October 9, WBEL changed their format from oldies to 1990s hits, branded as "The Beat 92.3/98.9" (simulcast on translators W222AU 92.3 FM Beloit and W255CZ 98.9 FM Janesville).

== Programming ==
Until 2014, ESPN Radio programming aired during most of the day, including Mike and Mike in the Morning, The Herd with Colin Cowherd, and The Scott Van Pelt Show. The station also aired The Jim Rome Show middays, while Jock Talk, the only daily local sports talk show in the Rockford/Beloit/Janesville region, served as the station's evening drive program.

In 2011, WTJK debuted four football talk shows: Wisconsin Prep Preview, focusing on Southern Wisconsin high school football with emphasis on the WIAA Big Eight Conference; NIC-10 Tonight, focusing on Northern Illinois high school football with emphasis on the Northern Illinois Conference; Campus Kickoff, a weekly college football show with emphasis on Wisconsin Badgers football, Northern Illinois Huskies football, and Wisconsin-Whitewater Warhawks football; and The Sunday Sideline Report, a wide-ranging Sunday morning show with preps and college recaps, and NFL previews, with emphasis on the Chicago Bears and Green Bay Packers. These shows run seasonally during the fall and winter. All of these shows returned in 2012 with the exception of Campus Kickoff.

In 2012, WTJK premiered The Prep Corner, a one-hour talk show on Saturday mornings looking back at the high school football action from Northern Illinois and Southern Wisconsin. The show's launch coincided with The Prep Corner on the station's website, featuring stories, standings, previews and polls on the local high school football scene.

Shows added to the WTJK lineup included Tuesdays With Aaron, a comprehensive interview with Green Bay Packers quarterback Aaron Rodgers, Inside Huskies Football, featuring Northern Illinois Huskies football coach Dave Doeren, The Badger Hour, a one-hour show devoted to Wisconsin Badgers football, and The Lance Leipold Show, featuring Wisconsin-Whitewater Warhawks football coach Lance Leipold.

As a talk station, WBEL's programming included a morning drive program, The Morning Mess, hosted by Scott Thompson; Jock Talk, carried over from WTJK's sports format, in middays; and afternoon drive program The Afternoon Drive hosted by Sly. WBEL featured ESPN Radio programming during nights and weekends.

WBEL features a diverse line-up of play-by-play programming, including the flagship (broadcasting) home of Beloit Snappers baseball, Hononegah Community High School football and basketball, and Roscoe Rush football. When the station was WTJK, it also carried Marquette Golden Eagles basketball, NASCAR Sprint Cup Series and NASCAR Nationwide Series events, Northern Illinois Huskies football, NBA on ESPN Radio, Major League Baseball on ESPN Radio, and the BCS on ESPN Radio. The station carried the Super Bowl, Monday Night Football, the Final Four, and NCAA Men's Division I Basketball Championship game from the Dial Global radio networks, and select Wisconsin-Whitewater Warhawks football games.

Past play-by-play events include Rockford RiverHawks baseball, Rockford IceHogs hockey, Rock River Raptors football and Chicago Bulls basketball.

== Translator ==
Broadcast translators for WBEL
Call sign	Frequency	City of license	FID	ERP (W)	Class	Transmitter coordinates	FCC info
W222AU	92.3 FM	Beloit, Wisconsin	155642	250	D	42°27′34.1″N 89°1′43.4″W	LMS
W255CZ	98.9 FM	Janesville, Wisconsin	150643	250	D	42°40′59″N 89°1′12.4″W	LMS
