= WBGR-FM =

Radio station in Wisconsin, US

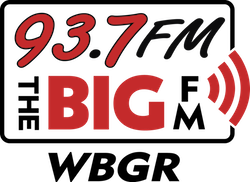
- Monroe, Wisconsin; United States
- Broadcast area: Green County
- Frequency: 93.7 MHz
- Branding: The Big FM 93.7

Programming
- Format: Classic hits; oldies

Ownership
- Owner: Big Radio
- Sister stations: WEKZ; WFPS; WFRL; WQLF

History
- First air date: June 1959 (as WEKZ-FM)
- Former call signs: WEKZ-FM (1959–2016)

Technical information
- Licensing authority: FCC
- Facility ID: 25132
- Class: B
- ERP: 36,000 watts
- HAAT: 177 meters (581 ft)
- Transmitter coordinates: 42°34′35″N 89°41′35.4″W

Links
- Public license information: Public file; LMS
- Webcast: Listen live
- Website: www.bigradio.fm

WBGR-FM (93.7 MHz; "The Big FM") is a radio station broadcasting a mix of classic hits and oldies formats, as well as morning news/talk programs. Licensed to Monroe, Wisconsin, United States, the station is owned by Big Radio. Its studios are east of Monroe, at W4765 Radio Lane. The transmitter site is southwest of Monroe, on Franklin Road. Co-owned WEKZ broadcasts at 1260 AM and features a classic country format.

== History ==
Until December 2010, WEKZ-FM was known as "The Big Easy 93.7" for many years and broadcast an adult contemporary format. Prior to adult contemporary, WEKZ-FM ran a beautiful music format as "EZ 93".

On January 14, 2013, it was announced in a joint press conference between Sly Sylvester and WEKZ-FM management that Sly would join the station after being laid off from WTDY.

On October 9, 2014, a thief stole wire and components from the station's tower; however, the thief was arrested and charged with felony theft.

The station changed its call sign to WBGR-FM on January 4, 2016.
