= WSBT-TV =

Television station in South Bend, Indiana

- South Bend, Indiana; United States
- Channels: Digital: 29 (UHF); Virtual: 22
- Branding: WSBT 22; Fox Michiana (22.2)

Programming
- Affiliations: 22.1: CBS; 22.2: Fox; 22.3: Charge!

Ownership
- Owner: Sinclair Broadcast Group; (WSBT Licensee, LLC)
- Sister stations: WSJV

History
- First air date: December 21, 1952
- Former channel numbers: Analog: 34 (UHF, 1952–1957), 22 (UHF, 1957–2009); Digital: 30 (UHF, 2001–2009), 22 (UHF, 2009–2019)
- Former affiliations: All secondary: NBC/ABC/DuMont (1952–1954); Fox (1994–1995)
- Call sign meaning: South Bend Tribune (former owner)

Technical information
- Licensing authority: FCC
- Facility ID: 73983
- ERP: 400 kW
- HAAT: 332.6 m (1,091 ft)
- Transmitter coordinates: 41°37′0″N 86°13′1″W

Links
- Public license information: Public file; LMS
- Website: wsbt.com

WSBT-TV (channel 22) is a television station in South Bend, Indiana, United States, affiliated with CBS and Fox. It is owned by Sinclair Broadcast Group alongside WSJV (channel 28). The two stations share studios on East Douglas Avenue in Mishawaka and transmitter facilities on Ironwood Road in South Bend, near the St. Joseph County 4-H Fairgrounds.

== History ==
=== Early years ===
The station first signed on the air on December 21, 1952, and was owned by the South Bend Tribune. Its broadcast facility was originally in a converted radio studio located on the third floor of the South Bend Tribune building at Lafayette and Colfax, in downtown South Bend. They were moved to Lafayette and Jefferson street in 1956. WSBT-TV was originally affiliated with all four major networks of the time: it was a primary CBS affiliate with secondary affiliations with NBC, ABC and DuMont; it lost the latter three networks when WSJV (channel 28, now a Heroes & Icons affiliate) signed on in March 1954. It was the first UHF station in the United States to produce a live telecast, a five-minute local news bulletin. Although WSBT is the oldest continuously operating UHF station in the country, it switched channels once during the analog era. Originally broadcasting on UHF channel 34, the station moved to channel 22 in 1958.

WSBT was the first station on UHF to telecast a high school basketball tournament, which came from John Adams High School. In 1953, WSBT-TV had several sports-related firsts. In the fall of that year, WSBT became the first television station in the country to present a closed-circuit telecast of a college football practice. This allowed Notre Dame coach Frank Leahy to direct the practice, as he was hospitalized at the time. WSBT-TV was also the first station in Indiana to broadcast in color, starting in 1954 in new studios designed by architect William Pereira.

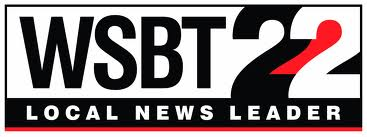
WSBT logo, used from 1994 to 2013.

When the Federal Communications Commission (FCC) tightened its cross-ownership regulations in the 1970s to bar common ownership of television stations and newspapers in the same market, the combination of the Tribune and the WSBT radio and television stations were among the few such combinations that were grandfathered under those rules. WSBT has the distinction of being the longest-tenured CBS affiliate in the state of Indiana.

In April 1995, Fox signed an affiliation agreement with then-ABC affiliate WSJV, with the switch taking effect on October 18 of that year. For about a year prior to the switch, some Fox programming such as the network's NFL game broadcasts and The Simpsons. had been airing on WSBT; the remainder of the network's programming was provided to most of the market on cable via Chicago owned-and-operated station WFLD, Grand Rapids affiliate WXMI, or Fort Wayne affiliate WFFT (depending on the location), while Detroit affiliate WKBD was carried on cable systems in some areas of the Michigan side of the market until WJBK switched to the network in December 1994.

=== 2008–present ===
The station unveiled its new all-digital facility in Mishawaka on November 16, 2008, beginning with the station's 10 p.m. newscast (which airs on its second digital subchannel). The new facility was built from the ground up for digital broadcasting, and channel 22 became the first Michiana station to broadcast its local newscasts in high definition. The radio stations began broadcasting from the new facility a few weeks earlier. The former WSBT studio building is now home to the area's PBS member station WNIT (channel 34).

On August 4, 2008, WSBT announced plans to purchase Weigel Broadcasting's three stations in the market, ABC affiliate WBND-LP (channel 57), CW affiliate WCWW-LP (channel 25) and MyNetworkTV affiliate WMYS-LP (channel 69). Since the three stations are all low-power outlets, they are not counted under FCC ownership rules which permit common ownership of a full-power television station and one or more low-power stations. Alongside WSBT-DT's existing three channels, the purchase would have given Schurz Communications a total of six channels in the market across four stations, including two "Big Four" network affiliates. However, in the absence of action by the FCC, the deal was called off in August 2009.

Schurz announced on September 14, 2015, that it would exit broadcasting and sell its television and radio stations to Gray Television for $442.5 million. Gray already owned WNDU-TV (channel 16) in South Bend. Despite WSBT-TV's higher ratings, Gray kept WNDU and sold WSBT-TV to expedite approval of the deal; on October 1, 2015, Gray announced that the station would be swapped to Sinclair Broadcast Group for WLUC-TV in Marquette, Michigan. The sale separated channel 22 from both the South Bend Tribune, which Schurz would keep, and the WSBT Radio Group, which was sold to Mid-West Family Broadcasting. The FCC approved the sale on February 12, 2016, and the sale would be completed on February 16. Sinclair's purchase of WSBT also marked a re-entry into Indiana as the company had owned WTTV/WTTK in Indianapolis from 1996 before that station was sold to Tribune Broadcasting in 2002. As a result of the sale, fellow CBS affiliate WWMT to the north in Kalamazoo, Michigan, which serves the Grand Rapids market, became a sister station to WSBT.

On July 25, 2016, Sinclair announced that WSBT-DT2 would affiliate with Fox beginning on August 1, 2016. Quincy Media had reached an agreement to transfer the affiliation from WSJV in exchange for the ABC and CW affiliations in Peoria, Illinois from Sinclair-owned WHOI. A few of WSJV's employees were transferred to WSBT. For a sixty-day period, WSBT-DT2 was simulcast on WSJV-DT1 to allow viewers to transition to the new signal, along with pay television providers. SBT2's broadcasts of South Bend Cubs baseball games also ended for the season; Sinclair intended to begin a new broadcasting relationship with the team for the 2017 season.

== News operation ==
WSBT-TV presently broadcasts 49 1/2 hours of locally produced newscasts each week (with 8 1/2 hours each weekday, four hours on Saturdays and three hours on Sundays); in addition to the newscasts seen on WSBT's primary channel, the station broadcasts 16 hours of newscasts a week for its Fox subchannel (with three hours each weekday and a half-hour each on Saturdays and Sundays). The station maintains a news and weather content agreement with their former sister radio stations (now owned by Mid-West Family Broadcasting) WSBT, WNSN, WYTZ-FM and WYRX-FM, with six Michigan Mid-West Family stations (WSJM-FM, WQYQ, WIRX, WCXT, WRRA-FM and WCSY-FM) also adding content sharing services in early 2019. Sinclair also continues to partner with former sister publication the South Bend Tribune, with news stories seen in the Tribune and the station providing the paper's observations for their weather page.

On September 5, 2006, the station began producing a half-hour weeknight 10 p.m. newscast on its second digital subchannel (currently branded as WSBT 22 News at 10 on Fox Michiana), after WSBT-DT2 lost its UPN affiliation. On November 16, 2008, WSBT became the first television station in the South Bend market to being broadcasting its local newscasts in high definition.

On September 8, 2014, WSBT added the area's first-ever 4 p.m. newscast with the half-hour newscast called WSBT 22 News, First at 4:00. On August 15, 2016, it expanded to an hour, replacing a second airing of Jeopardy! in the 4:30 timeslot.

On September 20, 2015, WSBT added a newscast on Sunday mornings from 6:30 to 8 a.m.

In August 2016, with WSBT-DT2 getting the Fox affiliation from WSJV, it added two additional hours of WSBT's morning newscast from 7 to 9 a.m. and expanded its 10 p.m. newscast on weeknights to an hour.

From 2017 to 2023, WSBT produced newscasts for Sinclair sister station WNWO-TV in Toledo, Ohio, and continues to do so for WOLF-TV in Hazleton, Pennsylvania. Both feature(d) a centralized studio and footage from local reporters.

=== Notable former on-air staff ===
- Sage Steele – reporter (1995–1997; later at ESPN)
- Kate Sullivan – reporter (recently left WBBM-TV in Chicago)
- Jackie Walorski – reporter (1985–1989; later represented Indiana's 2nd Congressional District from 2013 until her death on August 3, 2022)

== Technical information ==
=== Subchannels ===
The station's signal is multiplexed:

Subchannels of WSBT-TV
Channel	Res.	Short name	Programming
22.1	1080i	CBS	CBS
22.2	720p	FOX	Fox
22.3	480i	Charge!	Charge!
28.1	480i	ROAR	Roar (WSJV)
28.6	480i	Bounce	Bounce TV (WSJV)

Broadcast on behalf of another station

In 2001, WSBT-TV became the second TV station in Michiana (behind WNDU-TV) to broadcast a digital signal.

In 2003, WSBT launched a UPN-affiliated digital subchannel (branded as "UPN Michiana") on digital channel 22.2. WSBT-DT2 became an independent station in September 2006, when UPN shut down and its programming was merged with that of The WB to form The CW. At that point, UPN Michiana was rebranded as SBT2. On August 1, 2016, SBT2 became "Fox Michiana". The weather radar channel was discontinued at that time.

=== Analog-to-digital conversion ===
WSBT-TV shut down its analog signal, over UHF channel 22, on February 17, 2009, the original target date on which full-power television stations in the United States were to transition from analog to digital broadcasts under federal mandate (which was later pushed back to June 12, 2009). The station's digital signal relocated from its pre-transition UHF channel 30 to channel 22 for post-transition operations.
