= WSBT =

WSBT may refer to:

- WSBT-TV, a television station (channel 29, virtual 22) licensed to South Bend, Indiana, United States
- WSBT (AM), a radio station (960 AM) licensed to South Bend, Indiana, United States
- WNSN, a radio station (101.5 FM) licensed to South Bend, Indiana, United States, which held the call sign WSBT-FM from 1962 to 1975
