= WSJM =

WSJM may refer to:

- WSJM-FM, a radio station (94.9 FM) licensed to Benton Harbor, Michigan with a News Talk format.
- WQYQ, a radio station (1400 AM) licensed to St. Joseph, Michigan, which held the call sign WSJM from 1956 to 2020
