= WYTZ =

WYTZ may refer to:

- WYTZ-FM, a radio station (99.9 FM) licensed to Benton Harbor, Michigan, United States
- WRRA-FM, a radio station (97.5 FM) licensed to Bridgman, Michigan, which held the call sign WYTZ from 1995 to 2025
- WLS-FM, a radio station (94.7 FM) licensed to Chicago, Illinois, United States, which held the call sign WYTZ from 1986 to 1991
