= WCNF =

WCNF may refer to:

- WARB, a radio station (700 AM) licensed to serve Dothan, Alabama, United States, which held the call sign WCNF from 2010 to 2018
- WCXT, a radio station (98.3 FM) licensed to serve Hartford, Michigan, United States, which held the call sign WCNF in 2008
- WSJM-FM, a radio station (94.9 FM) licensed to serve Benton Harbor, Michigan, which held the call sign WCNF from 1999 to 2008
