= St. Joseph, Michigan =

Saint Joseph, Michigan
- City
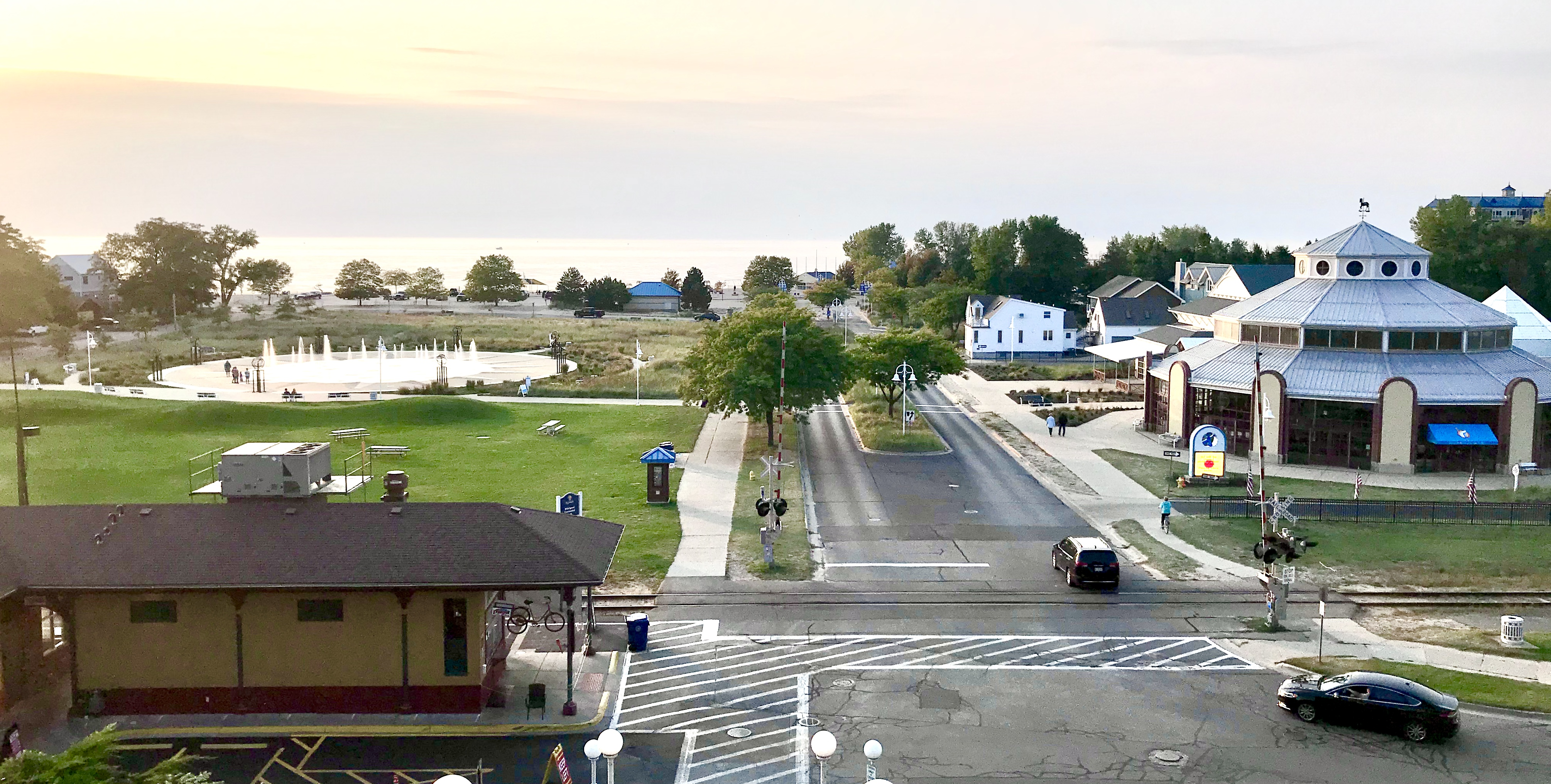
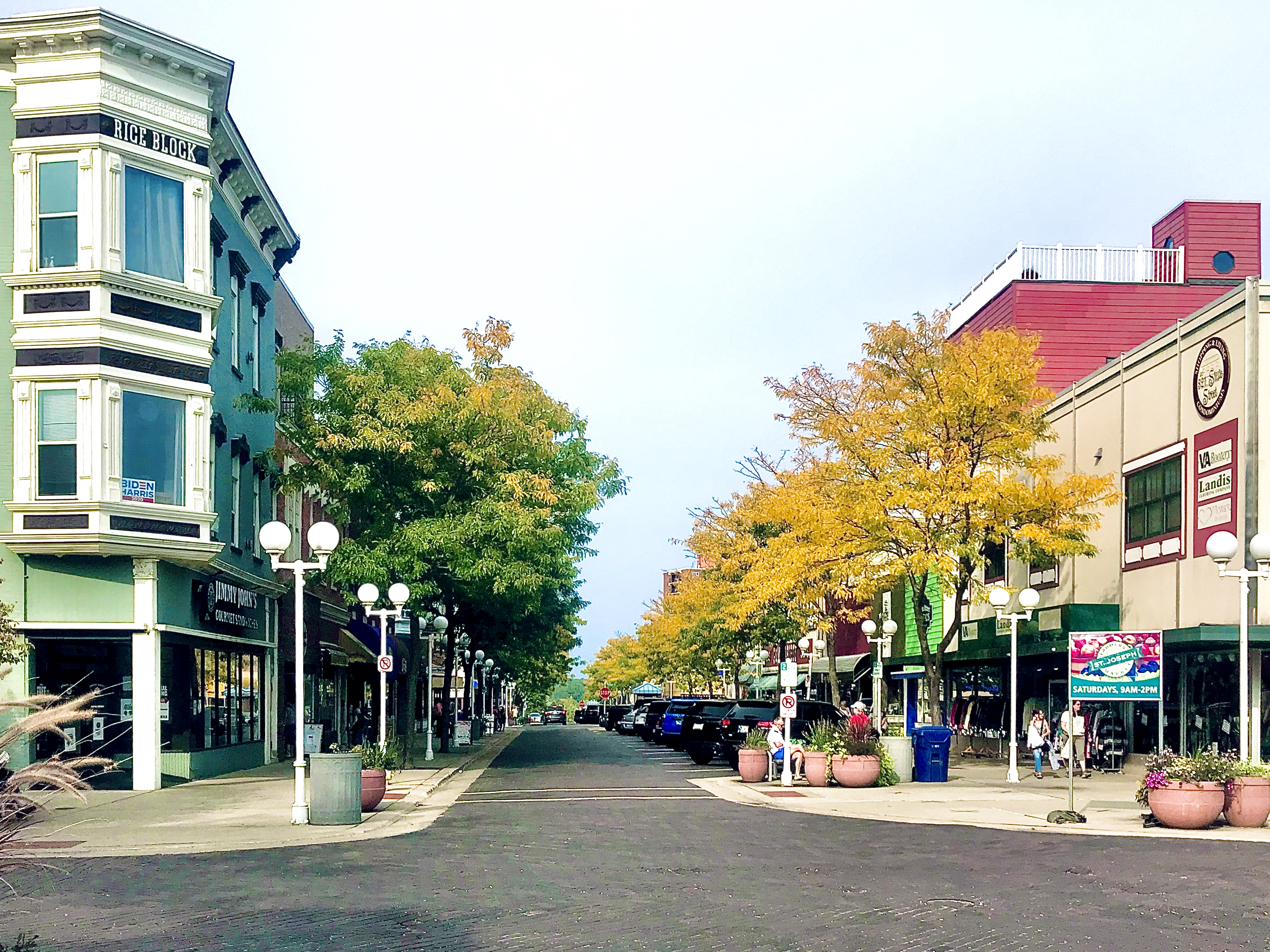
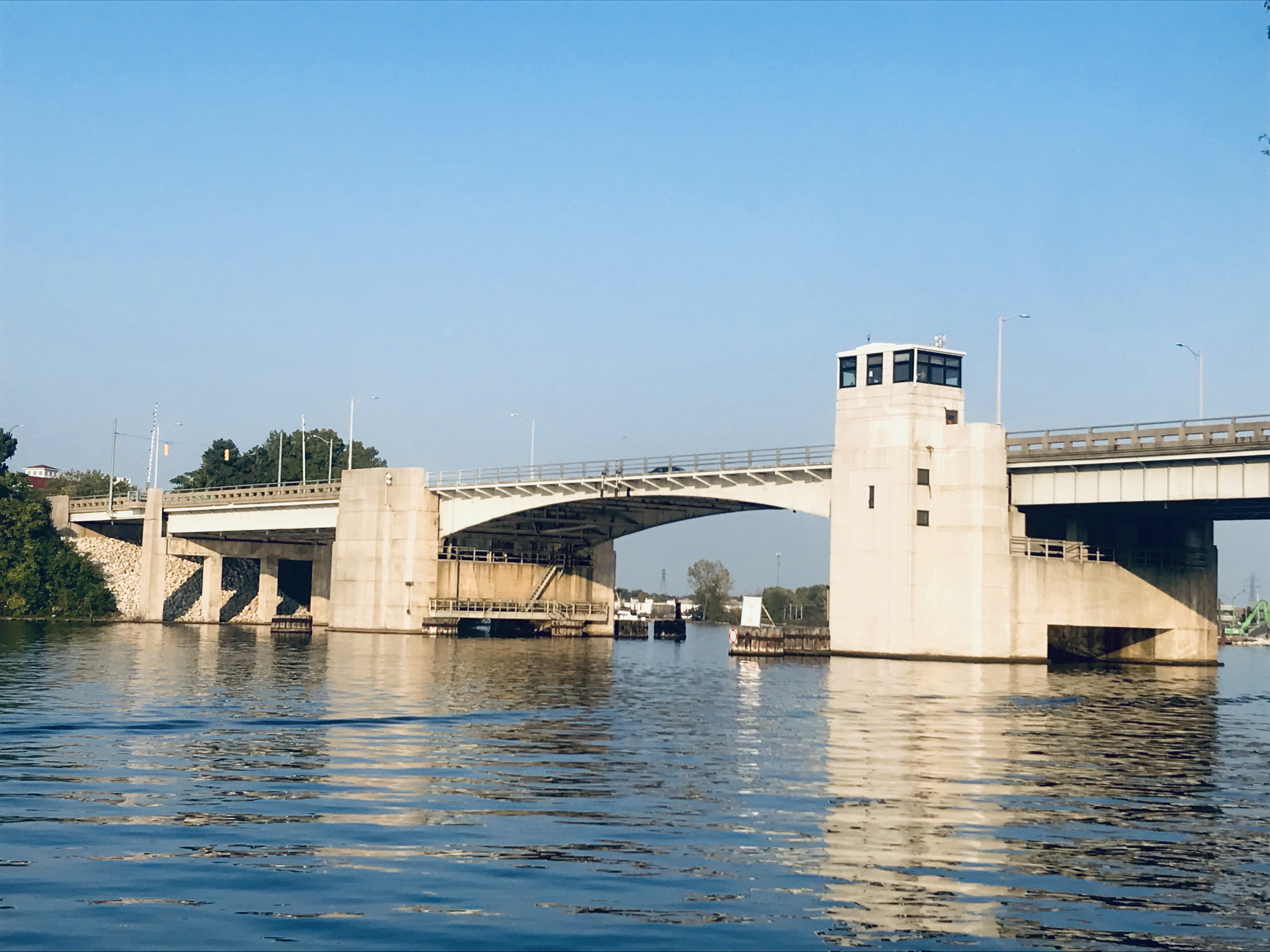
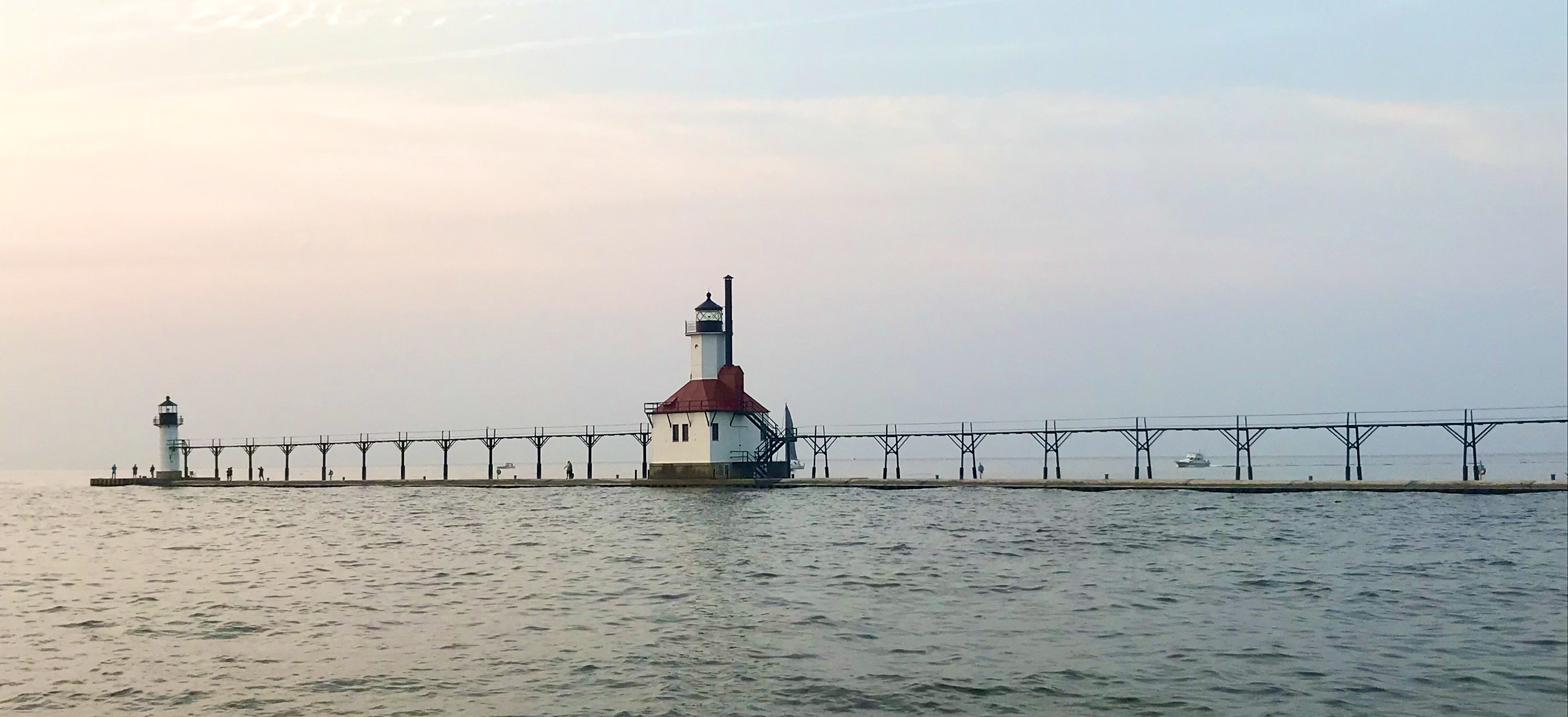
- Clockwise from top: Silver Beach, Blossomland Bridge, North Pier Inner Lighthouse, and State Street in downtown St. Joseph

- logo
- Nickname: Saint Joe
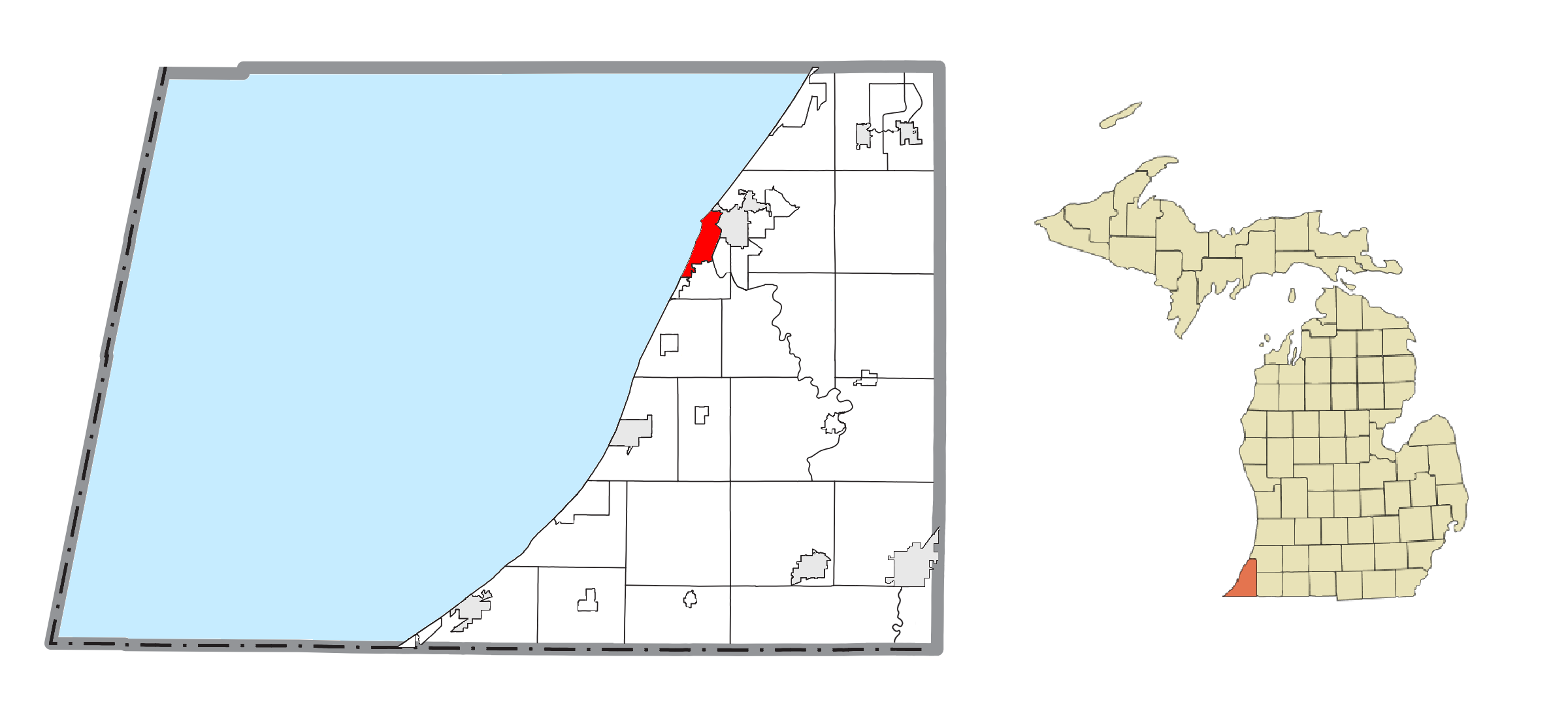
- Location within Berrien County

- Location within the state of Michigan
- Coordinates: 42°05′53″N 86°29′03″W
- Country: United States
- State: Michigan
- County: Berrien
- Incorporated: 1834 (village); 1891 (city)

Government
  - Type: Council–manager
  - Mayor: Brook Thomas

Area
  - Total: 4.78 sq mi (12.38 km^{2})
  - Land: 3.20 sq mi (8.30 km^{2})
  - Water: 1.58 sq mi (4.08 km^{2})
- Elevation: 630 ft (192 m)

Population (2020)
  - Total: 7,856
  - Density: 2,452.8/sq mi (947.05/km^{2})
- Time zone: UTC-5 (Eastern (EST))
  - Summer (DST): UTC-4 (EDT)
- ZIP code(s): 49085
- Area code: 269
- FIPS code: 26-70960
- GNIS feature ID: 0636762
- Website: Official website

Saint Joseph, colloquially known as Saint Joe, is a city in and the county seat of Berrien County, Michigan. It was incorporated as a village in 1834 and as a city in 1891. As of the 2020 census, the city population was 7,856. It lies on the shore of Lake Michigan, at the mouth of the St. Joseph River, about 90 miles (140 km) east-northeast of Chicago. The city and adjacent Benton Harbor are known as the "Twin Cities".

== History ==
The mouth of the Saint Joseph River at present day Saint Joseph was an important point of Miami and Potawatomi travel and commerce, as it lay along a key water route between the Great Lakes and the Mississippi River. Both the Miami and Potawatomi used this route and would use the area as a camp. The St. Joseph River also allowed for connection with the Sauk Trail, which was the major land trail through Michigan. In 1669, the mouth of the river was seen by European explorers. French explorer René-Robert Cavelier, Sieur de La Salle, built Fort Miami on the bluff overlooking Lake Michigan. In 1678, he waited for the ship Le Griffon, which never returned. Once the ship was deemed lost, La Salle and his men made the first land crossing of the lower peninsula by Europeans.

The next permanent white settler in Saint Joseph was William Burnett, who around 1780 started a trading post at the mouth of the Saint Joseph River. The post traded food, furs and goods with places including Detroit, Mackinac and Chicago. In 1829, Calvin Britain, who had come from Jefferson County, New York, and had taught at the Carey Mission at Niles for two years, came to the site of Saint Joseph. Shortly thereafter, he laid out the plat of the village, then known as Newburyport, named after a coastal city in Massachusetts. Britain was influential in attracting other settlers to the area. Lots sold rapidly and the village flourished.

The Saint Joseph river mouth was straightened through a channel and piers were added later. The first lighthouse in Saint Joseph contends with Chicago's original lighthouse as the first to be built on Lake Michigan. Newburyport changed its name to St. Joseph when it was incorporated on March 7, 1834. The city was incorporated June 5, 1891. It was reported in 2026 that the same year, a merger had been attempted between St. Joseph and Benton Harbor.

The first water route across Lake Michigan between Saint Joseph and Chicago began as a mail route in 1825, but service was sporadic until 1842 when Samuel and Eber Ward began a permanent service. That lasted eleven years. Before the rise of large ship companies on Lake Michigan, service was done primarily by owner-operated boats. With the rise in shipping in Benton Harbor and the rise in tourism in Saint Joseph, permanent and larger operations began operating out of the ports. The creation of the River Yacht Club in 1913 allowed expanded use of sailboats in the area.

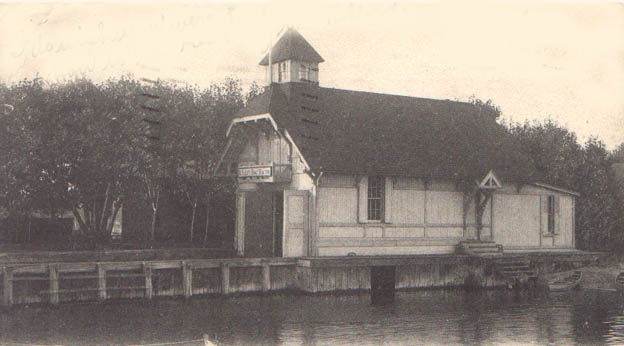
Original Saint Joesph Lifesaving Service boathouse, circa 1874.

The Coast Guard still maintains a station on this site. (Note: As keeper of the Saint Joseph Life-Saving Station, Station 6, Joseph Napier demonstrated his heroism during multiple rescues as a career lifesaver on the Great Lakes. His gallantry was no more visible than on the day he risked his life and led his crew into gale-force winds to save six souls aboard a stranded vessel.") In 1876 the United States Lifesaving Service built a Lifesaving Station at Saint Joseph, appointing Joseph Napier as the first stationkeeper.

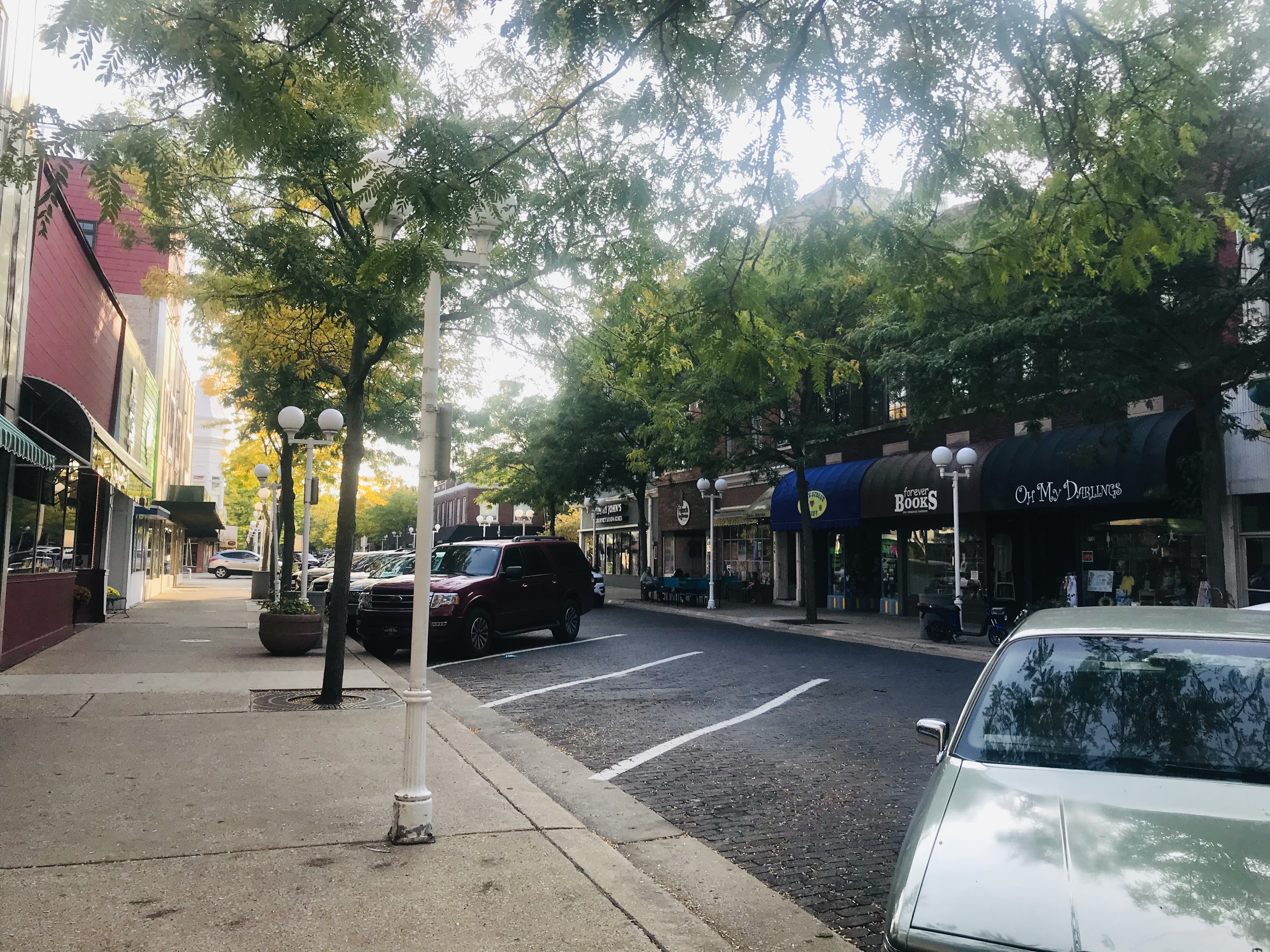
Downtown Saint Joseph

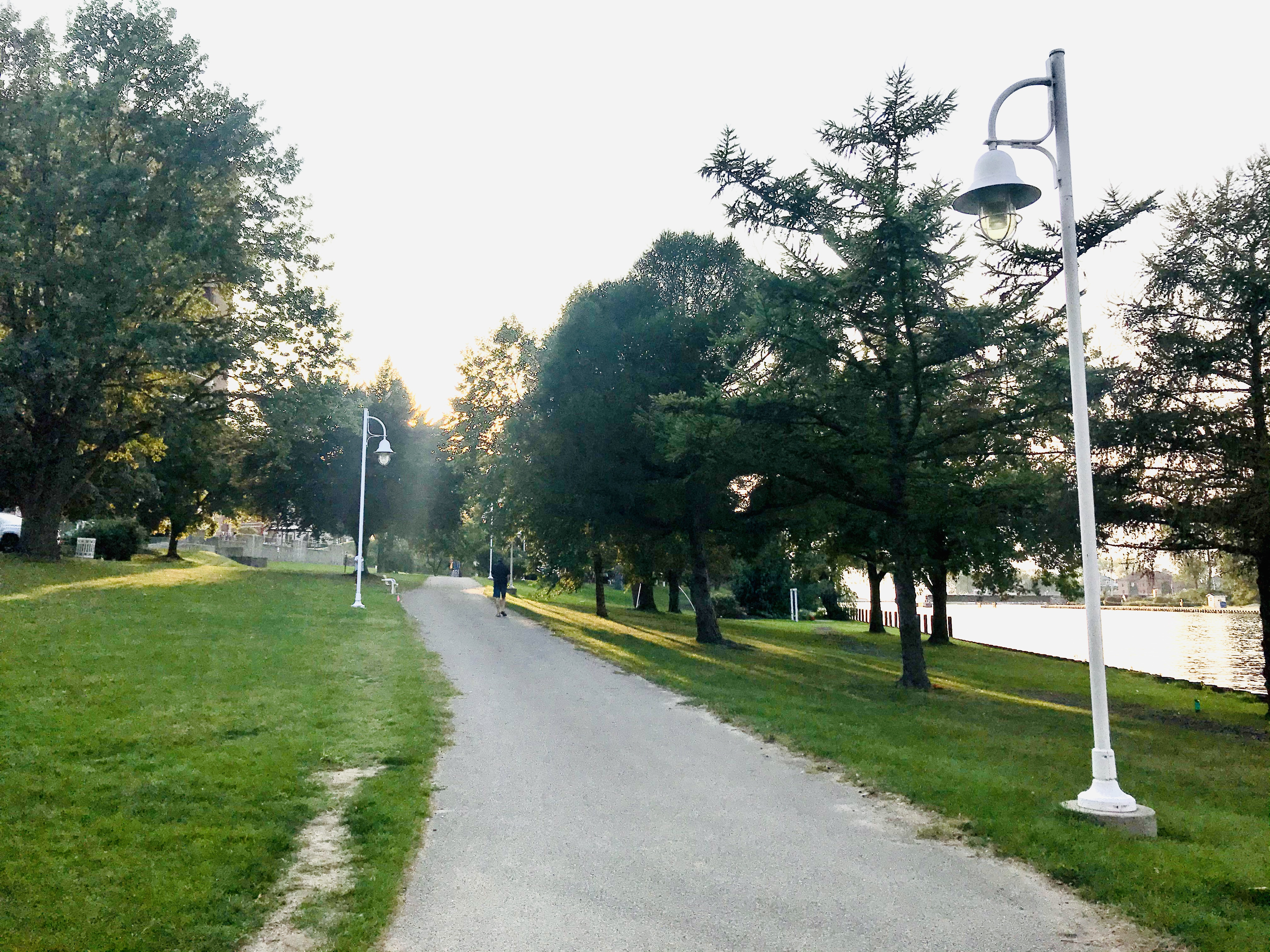
Maritime Heritage Trail Park

After a bitterly fought political contest, Saint Joseph was named the seat of Berrien County in 1894, when Berrien Springs relinquished that status. The three largest towns in the county, Benton Harbor, Saint Joseph, and Niles, each wanted to be the county seat, but none had a majority vote. Once St. Joseph and Benton Harbor voters combined their votes, St. Joseph had enough to win.

On October 11, 1898, Augustus Moore Herring took one of his gliders, fitted with a motor, to Silver Beach in Saint Joseph. Herring's machine lifted ever so slightly off the ground and actually flew for seven seconds. Eleven days later, the inventor made another flight of ten seconds. While Herring had a powered heavier-than-air craft, he did not have a way to control it. It was left to the Wright brothers to perfect controlled flight five years later, and give themselves and Kitty Hawk, North Carolina, a place in history that might have ended up belonging to Herring and Saint Joseph.

=== Transportation history ===
Two major shipping companies operated between Saint Joseph and Chicago during the last half of the 19th century, the Goodrich Transportation Company and the local firm of Graham and Morton. They dominated the traffic at St. Joseph for more than 100 years, although other smaller companies did operate during this time.

Starting in 1874, Henry Graham and J. Stanley Morton began operating a steam line out of St. Joseph. Their collaboration would become the Graham and Morton Transportation Company. Through vigorous competition, they won the war to become the major carrier out of Saint Joseph. Goodrich stopped service to the Twin Cities in 1880. The company grew quickly and over the fifty plus years of its existence became the second largest line on Lake Michigan, behind only Goodrich.

In 1924, as graded roads began to line the Lake Michigan shoreline, G & M was forced to merge into Goodrich. Like most other ports along Lake Michigan, Saint Joseph saw a large drop in traffic during the early years of the twentieth century, which was exacerbated further by the Great Depression. The route between Chicago and St. Joseph survived until the 1950s.

On January 29, 1870, the Chicago and Michigan Lake Shore Railroad extended a rail line from New Buffalo to St. Joseph. This railroad connected Saint Joseph to Grand Rapids, Muskegon, Detroit and Chicago. (Prior to this, the only connection Saint Joseph had to these other cities was by water.) The line was reorganized as the Chicago and West Michigan Railway and then was incorporated into the Pere Marquette Railroad. Nowadays it is recognized as the CSX Grand Rapids Subdivision which runs from Chicago, IL to Grand Rapids, MI along the former Pere Marquette Railroad. Passenger Rail Service is provided by Amtrak's "Pere Marquette" service running from Chicago, IL to Grand Rapids, MI, with stops in St. Joseph, Bangor, Holland, and Grand Rapids. Service is offered with one daily round trip.

=== Business and industry history ===
In 1892, Truscott Boat Manufacturing Co moved to Saint Joseph from Grand Rapids. In the early 20th Century, the company was the largest employer in St. Joseph with 700 employees and built 600 wooden boats per year. The company built boats for the government in World War I, struggled during the Depression, was sold in 1940, revived during World War II to build ships for the Navy and went bankrupt in 1948.

In 1911, Louis, Emory, and Frederick Upton began a business that produced household washing machines. The business soon became a boom and has continued to grow to this day. In 1929, Upton Machine Company merged with Nineteen Hundred Corp., taking the latter name. The company began marketing a line of appliances known as the "Whirlpool" brand in 1948. Within the next decade, Nineteen Hundred changed its name to Whirlpool. Today, Whirlpool Corporation is the largest manufacturer of major home appliances and maintains a large presence in Benton Harbor and nearby Saint Joseph. Whirlpool has its world headquarters in Benton Harbor.

In 1891 the Silver Beach Amusement Park was opened on land between the lake and mouth of the river in Saint Joseph. Logan Drake and Louis Wallace bought the land from the Pere Marquette Railroad and added cottages to lure tourists to the lake front. As the park aged and grew in popularity, the pair added many attractions, including concessions, games, pool, a boardwalk and different rides. The first roller coaster was built in 1904 and was called the Chase Through the Clouds, which was replaced by the Velvet roller coaster (renamed the Comet). Among the most popular attractions were the carousel and the Shadowland Ballroom, built in 1927. During the 1960s and 1970s, the buildings decayed and the crowds decreased. Finally, crime in the park led police to shut it down in 1970.

The American Society of Agricultural and Biological Engineers is based in St. Joseph.

== Geography ==
According to the United States Census Bureau, the city has a total area of 4.80 square miles (12.43 km^{2}), of which 3.22 square miles (8.34 km^{2}) is land and 1.58 square miles (4.09 km^{2}) is water.

== Demographics ==
Historical population
| Census | Pop. | Note | %± |
|---|---|---|---|
| 1880 | 2,603 | | — |
| 1890 | 3,733 | | 43.4% |
| 1900 | 5,155 | | 38.1% |
| 1910 | 5,936 | | 15.2% |
| 1920 | 7,251 | | 22.2% |
| 1930 | 8,349 | | 15.1% |
| 1940 | 8,963 | | 7.4% |
| 1950 | 10,223 | | 14.1% |
| 1960 | 11,755 | | 15.0% |
| 1970 | 11,042 | | −6.1% |
| 1980 | 9,622 | | −12.9% |
| 1990 | 9,214 | | −4.2% |
| 2000 | 8,789 | | −4.6% |
| 2010 | 8,365 | | −4.8% |
| 2020 | 7,856 | | −6.1% |
U.S. Decennial Census

=== Racial and ethnic composition ===
Saint Joseph city, Michigan – Racial and ethnic composition Note: the US Census treats Hispanic/Latino as an ethnic category. This table excludes Latinos from the racial categories and assigns them to a separate category. Hispanics/Latinos may be of any race.
| Race / Ethnicity (NH = Non-Hispanic) | Pop 2000 | Pop 2010 | Pop 2020 | % 2000 | % 2010 | % 2020 |
|---|---|---|---|---|---|---|
| White alone (NH) | 7,879 | 7,227 | 6,533 | 89.65% | 86.40% | 83.16% |
| Black or African American alone (NH) | 448 | 444 | 272 | 5.10% | 5.31% | 3.46% |
| Native American or Alaska Native alone (NH) | 33 | 24 | 20 | 0.38% | 0.29% | 0.25% |
| Asian alone (NH) | 206 | 281 | 320 | 2.34% | 3.36% | 4.07% |
| Native Hawaiian or Pacific Islander alone (NH) | 2 | 0 | 2 | 0.02% | 0.00% | 0.03% |
| Other race alone (NH) | 5 | 17 | 36 | 0.06% | 0.20% | 0.46% |
| Mixed race or Multiracial (NH) | 103 | 137 | 337 | 1.17% | 1.64% | 4.29% |
| Hispanic or Latino (any race) | 113 | 235 | 336 | 1.29% | 2.81% | 4.28% |
| Total | 8,789 | 8,365 | 7,856 | 100.00% | 100.00% | 100.00% |

=== 2020 census ===
As of the 2020 census, St. Joseph had a population of 7,856. The median age was 42.6 years. 15.9% of residents were under the age of 18 and 21.2% of residents were 65 years of age or older. For every 100 females there were 90.8 males, and for every 100 females age 18 and over there were 90.0 males age 18 and over.

99.8% of residents lived in urban areas, while 0.2% lived in rural areas.

There were 4,088 households in St. Joseph, of which 18.4% had children under the age of 18 living in them. Of all households, 37.3% were married-couple households, 22.9% were households with a male householder and no spouse or partner present, and 33.2% were households with a female householder and no spouse or partner present. About 45.5% of all households were made up of individuals and 15.3% had someone living alone who was 65 years of age or older.

There were 4,884 housing units, of which 16.3% were vacant. The homeowner vacancy rate was 2.3% and the rental vacancy rate was 11.0%.

=== 2010 census ===
As of the census of 2010, there were 8,365 people, 3,933 households, and 1,941 families residing in the city. The population density was 2,597.8 inhabitants per square mile (1,003.0/km^{2}). There were 4,795 housing units at an average density of 1,489.1 per square mile (574.9/km^{2}). The racial makeup of the city was 88.1% White, 5.3% African American, 0.3% Native American, 3.4% Asian, 0.9% from other races, and 1.9% from two or more races. Hispanic or Latino residents of any race were 2.8% of the population.

There were 3,933 households, of which 20.6% had children under the age of 18 living with them, 37.5% were married couples living together, 8.9% had a female householder with no husband present, 2.9% had a male householder with no wife present, and 50.6% were non-families. 43.5% of all households were made up of individuals, and 13.9% had someone living alone who was 65 years of age or older. The average household size was 1.97 and the average family size was 2.74.

The median age in the city was 41.6 years. 16.4% of residents were under the age of 18; 9.2% were between the ages of 18 and 24; 28.6% were from 25 to 44; 27.2% were from 45 to 64; and 18.6% were 65 years of age or older. The gender makeup of the city was 48.8% male and 51.2% female.

=== 2000 census ===
As of the census of 2000, there were 8,789 people, 4,117 households, and 2,058 families residing in the city. The population density was 2,561.3 inhabitants per square mile (988.9/km^{2}). There were 4,594 housing units at an average density of 1,338.8 per square mile (516.9/km^{2}). The racial makeup of the city was 90.31% White, 5.11% African American, 0.41% Native American, 2.39% Asian, 0.02% Pacific Islander, 0.46% from other races, and 1.31% from two or more races. Hispanic or Latino residents of any race were 1.29% of the population.

There were 4,117 households, out of which 22.0% had children under the age of 18 living with them, 37.6% were married couples living together, 9.4% had a female householder with no husband present, and 50.0% were non-families. 44.1% of all households were made up of individuals, and 14.3% had someone living alone who was 65 years of age or older. The average household size was 1.99 and the average family size was 2.77.

In the city, 19.0% of residents were under the age of 18, 9.5% were from 18 to 24, 30.6% from 25 to 44, 22.7% from 45 to 64, and 18.2% were 65 years of age or older. The median age was 39 years. For every 100 females, there were 96.0 males. For every 100 females age 18 and over, there were 92.9 males.

The median income for a household in the city was $37,032, and the median income for a family was $51,328. Males had a median income of $36,250 versus $26,395 for females. The per capita income for the city was $24,949. About 4.3% of families and 6.6% of the population were below the poverty line, including 6.1% of those under age 18 and 6.3% of those age 65 or over.

== Government ==
City government is organized as a council-manager government. There is a city commission with five members, who are elected at large. City elections are held in November of even-numbered years; at each election, three commission seats become open. The two candidates receiving the greatest number of votes receive four-year terms, while the candidate receiving the third-greatest number of votes receives a two-year term. At the first meeting following each election, the commission selects from its own number a mayor and mayor pro tem for the following two years. The city commission is a part-time body, typically meeting twice each month to act as a legislative body and set general policies. Day-to-day operations are delegated to a contracted city manager.

Major city facilities include the City Hall and Police Station at 700 Broad Street; the Department of Public Works at 1160 Broad Street; the Fire Department at 915 Broad Street; the Maud Preston Palenske Public Library at 500 Market Street; the John and Dede Howard Ice Arena at 2414 Willa Drive; the Water Treatment Plant at 1701 Lions Park Drive; and Riverview Cemetery at 2525 Niles Road.

The city Water Treatment Plant provides drinking water to the communities of the Lake Michigan Shoreline Water and Sewage Treatment Authority, which serves Lincoln Charter Township, Royalton Township, Saint Joseph Charter Township, and the villages of Shoreham and Stevensville. Wastewater treatment is provided through the Joint Wastewater Treatment Plant, which is jointly owned by the cities of St. Joseph and Benton Harbor, and which also serves the LMSWSTA communities, Benton Charter Township and portions of Sodus Township.

Current City Commission
| Name | Title | Year First Elected/Appointed |
|---|---|---|
| Brook Thomas | Commissioner | 2021 |
| Michael Fernandez | Commissioner-Elect | 2023 |
| Mike Sarola | Commissioner | 2021 |
| Tess Ulrey | Commissioner-Elect | 2023 |
| Michele Binkley | Commissioner | 2017 |

== Culture ==
Saint Joseph is cohost of the annual Blossomtime Festival with Benton Harbor.

The Krasl Art Fair on the Bluff is held in Lake Bluff Park every year on the weekend after the July 4 weekend.

The Concours d'Elegance of Southwest Michigan is held annually on the second Saturday in August. The inaugural show was held in 2005. An invitational fine car show, 75 vintage car owners are asked to show vehicles in St. Joseph's downtown Lake Bluff Park.

=== Venetian Festival ===
From 1979 to 2011, St. Joseph was the site of the Venetian Festival, which comprised three traditions: the Blessing of the River, the Lighted Boat Parade, and a Classic Boat Parade. The festival's name was a nod to similarities between Saint Joseph and Venice, Italy.

In 1987, USS Oliver Hazard Perry came to port, and its commander let festival-goers take a free tour. This initiated a tradition whereby US Navy ships regularly came to the festival. Music also contributed to the festival's success, and was offered at three locations: the Bluff, Shadowland Pavilion, and the Main Stage. Many local musicians played at the Bluff and the Pavilion, while the Main Stage hosted such well-known bands as the Beach Boys, Cheap Trick, Gin Blossoms, Little Big Town, and Jason Michael Carroll.

In a study done by Michigan State University in 1998, approximately 63,000 people attended the 1997 Venetian Festival and the festival generated around $1.7 million in revenue to the local economy.

Competitions also took place along Silver Beach and the Saint Joseph River during the festival, including volleyball tournaments, a river run & walk, and sand sculpturing. The Lighted Boat Parade and the Classic Boat Display both took place along the St. Joseph River and were a part of the Venetian Festival since 1987. Fireworks and rides were also attractions, bringing people from bigger cities such as Chicago. A blessing of the river was done July 30, and continues as a tradition to this day.

== Infrastructure ==
- I-94
- BL I-94
- I-196 begins just northeast of Benton Harbor–St. Joseph
- US 31
- M-63
- M-139
- The Saint Joseph railway station is serviced daily by Amtrak's Pere Marquette passenger train.
- Twin Cities Area Transportation Authority (TCATA) provides public transit throughout the Saint Joseph-Benton Harbor area. It was originally a dial-a-ride system. More recently, it launched three fixed routes. Only one of those routes, the Red Route, passes through Saint Joseph. The other routes are limited to Benton Harbor and its vicinity.
- The Saint Joseph Harbor is a commercial port that receives bulk goods from lake freighters. Saint Joseph has two docks within city limits and another dock is located in Benton Harbor. Due to limitations on the depth of the port and lack of dredging funding, the harbor is experiencing a down trend in the amount of tonnage. The 2007 numbers for the port are:

2007 Shipping Report
| Shipper | Good | Number of Vessels | Tonnage |
|---|---|---|---|
| Consumers | Limestone, sand and slag | 27 | 277,106 |
| Dock 63 | Limestone, stone and sand | 13 | 171,187 |
| Lafarge | Bulk Cement | 27 | 185,250 |
| Total | | 67 | 633,543 |

Previous year tonnage includes:

Past Tonnage
| Year | Vessels | Tonnage |
|---|---|---|
| 2000 | 69 | 770,189 |
| 2001 | 87 | 1,118,964 |
| 2002 | 82 | 665,917 |
| 2003 | 90 | 794,572 |
| 2004 | 85 | 767,975 |

== Education ==
- Saint Joseph High School (Bears)
- Upton Middle School
- Brown Elementary
- Lincoln Elementary
- E.P. Clarke Elementary
- Our Lady of the Lake Catholic (Lakers)
- Lake Michigan College (Red Hawks)
- Trinity Lutheran School (Kingsmen)
- Michigan Lutheran High School (Titans)
- Grace Lutheran School (Hornets)

== Media ==
Saint Joseph is served by The Herald-Palladium newspaper, whose offices are in nearby St. Joseph Township. It is part of the South Bend/Elkhart television market, and is served by sister radio stations WCSY-FM, WCXT, WIRX, WQYQ, WRRA-FM, and WSJM-FM, as well as some in the South Bend market.

== Notable people ==
- Marc Bitzer, CEO at Whirlpool Corporation
- Dave Carlock, record producer, songwriter and multi-instrumentalist
- Nina Davuluri, Miss New York 2013, Miss America 2014
- Jeff M. Fettig, Ex-CEO of Whirlpool Corporation
- James Frey, writer
- Harry Gast, farmer and Michigan state legislator
- Sean Giambrone, actor
- Michael Joseph Green, Roman Catholic bishop
- Rob Harbin, Bliss 66 guitarist
- Doris Keane, actress
- Benjamin Franklin King Jr., humorist and writer
- Dave Machemer, Major League Baseball player and Minor League Baseball manager
- Kenneth Marshall, actor
- Reilly Opelka, tennis player
- Amy Robach, former news anchor, ABC's Good Morning America
- Rachel Renee Russell, author of the #1 New York Times bestselling children's book series, Dork Diaries
- Roger Craig Smith, voice actor
- Fred Upton, politician (U.S. House of Representatives)
- Frederick Upton, Senior Vice President of Whirlpool Corporation
- Kate Upton, model and actress
- Louis Upton, Founder of Whirlpool Corporation
- Robert J. Warren, President of LECO Corporation
- Karen Ziemba, actress, singer, and dancer

== See also ==
- St. Joseph courthouse shooting
- St. Joseph North Pier Inner and Outer Lights
- Saint Joseph
