= WNSN =

Coordinates: 41.617°N 86.217°W

- South Bend, Indiana; United States
- Broadcast area: Michiana
- Frequency: 101.5 MHz
- Branding: Sunny 101.5

Programming
- Format: Adult contemporary
- Affiliations: Premiere Networks

Ownership
- Owner: Mid-West Family Broadcasting; (WSJM, Inc.)
- Sister stations: WSBT; WYTZ-FM; WYRX-FM

History
- First air date: August 1, 1962 (as WSBT-FM)
- Former call signs: WSBT-FM (1962–1975); WWJY (1975–1981); WTHQ (1981–1984)
- Call sign meaning: "Sunny"

Technical information
- Licensing authority: FCC
- Facility ID: 73984
- Class: B
- ERP: 13,000 watts
- HAAT: 296 meters (971 ft)

Links
- Public license information: Public file; LMS
- Webcast: Listen live
- Website: www.sunny1015.com

WNSN (101.5 MHz) is a commercial FM radio station in South Bend, Indiana. It is owned by Mid-West Family Broadcasting and airs an adult contemporary radio format known as Sunny 101.5. WNSN is usually the market's top rated radio station according to the Nielsen ratings. Sunny 101.5 carries Delilah's syndicated love songs show in the evening from Premiere Networks. Most weekends it features 1980s hits. From mid-November to December 26, WNSN switches to all Christmas music.

The studios and offices are on Monroe Street in Downtown South Bend. The transmitter is off Ironwood Road, south of downtown South Bend. It is co-located with sister station 960 WSBT's tower.

== History ==
=== WSBT-FM, WWJY and WTHQ ===
The station signed on the air on August 1, 1962, as WSBT-FM. At first it simulcast the middle of the road (MOR) format of music, news and sports, on its AM counterpart, 960 WSBT. In the late 1960s, WSBT-FM began separate programming, airing beautiful music. From the mid-1970s until 1981, the station was WWJY, using the Schulke beautiful music package.

In 1981, the station shifted to adult contemporary music as WTHQ, using the Satellite Music Network's StarStation format. Three years later on May 6, 1984, the station switched to locally programmed AC music, with the call letters WNSN, and became an affiliate of the Transtar Radio Networks. The SN stands for "Sunny 101.5". WNSN would later compete against WZZP for AC competition until 1988, when WZZP began its own Top 40 battle against dominant station WNDU-FM for several years.

=== Ownership changes ===
Longtime owner Schurz Communications announced on September 14, 2015, that it would exit broadcasting and sell its television and radio stations, including WNSN, to Gray Television for $442.5 million. The sale separated WNSN from both the station's longtime co-owned newspaper, the South Bend Tribune (which Schurz kept until 2019), and WSBT-TV 22 (which was sold separately due to Gray's existing ownership of WNDU-TV 16).

Gray initially said it would keep Schurz' radio stations. But on November 2, it announced that Mid-West Family Broadcasting would acquire WNSN and Schurz's other South Bend radio stations for $5.5 million. The purchase by Mid-West was consummated on February 16, 2016.
