= WYRX-FM =

Simulcast of WIRX Benton Harbor
- Plymouth, Indiana; United States
- Broadcast area: South Bend / Michiana
- Frequency: 94.3 MHz
- Branding: WIRX

Programming
- Format: Mainstream rock
- Affiliations: Detroit Lions Radio Network

Ownership
- Owner: Mid-West Family Broadcasting; (WSJM, Inc.)
- Sister stations: WSBT; WYTZ-FM; WNSN; WIRX

History
- First air date: July 20, 1966 (as WTCA-FM)
- Former call signs: WTCA-FM (1966–1981); WNZE (1981–1994); WLTA (1994–1996); WZOC (1996–2024)
- Call sign meaning: Similar to WIRX

Technical information
- Licensing authority: FCC
- Facility ID: 12999
- Class: B1
- ERP: 11,500 watts
- HAAT: 150 meters (490 ft)
- Transmitter coordinates: 41.528°N 86.266°W

Links
- Public license information: Public file; LMS
- Webcast: Listen live
- Website: www.wirx.com

WYRX-FM (94.3 MHz) is a radio station licensed to Plymouth, Indiana, serving Michiana and the South Bend area. WYRX-FM has a mainstream rock format, simulcasting WIRX, and is owned by Mid-West Family Broadcasting.

== History ==
=== WTCA-FM ===
The station began broadcasting on July 20, 1966, holding the call sign WTCA-FM, a sister station to AM 1050 WTCA. The station was owned by the Kunze family's Community Service Broadcasters. Its transmitter was located one mile south of Plymouth, Indiana, and it had an ERP of 3,000 watts at a HAAT of 220 feet.

=== WNZE ===
In 1981, the station's call sign was changed to WNZE. As WNZE, the station aired a country music format. In 1992, the station's transmitter was moved to Lakeville, Indiana, and it ERP was increased to 11,300 watts at a HAAT of 150 meters.

=== WLTA ===
In 1994, the station's call sign was changed to WLTA, and the station adopted a soft AC format. The call sign WLTA had been held by 100.7 in Elkhart, Indiana, which changed formats from soft AC to country as WBYT "B-100".

=== WZOC ===
In spring 1996, the station adopted an oldies format, and its call sign was changed to WZOC. The station was branded "Oldies 94.3". In summer 1996, the station was sold to Plymouth Broadcasting for $575,000. In March 2012, WZOC was sold to Douglas Road Radio for $2,100,000.

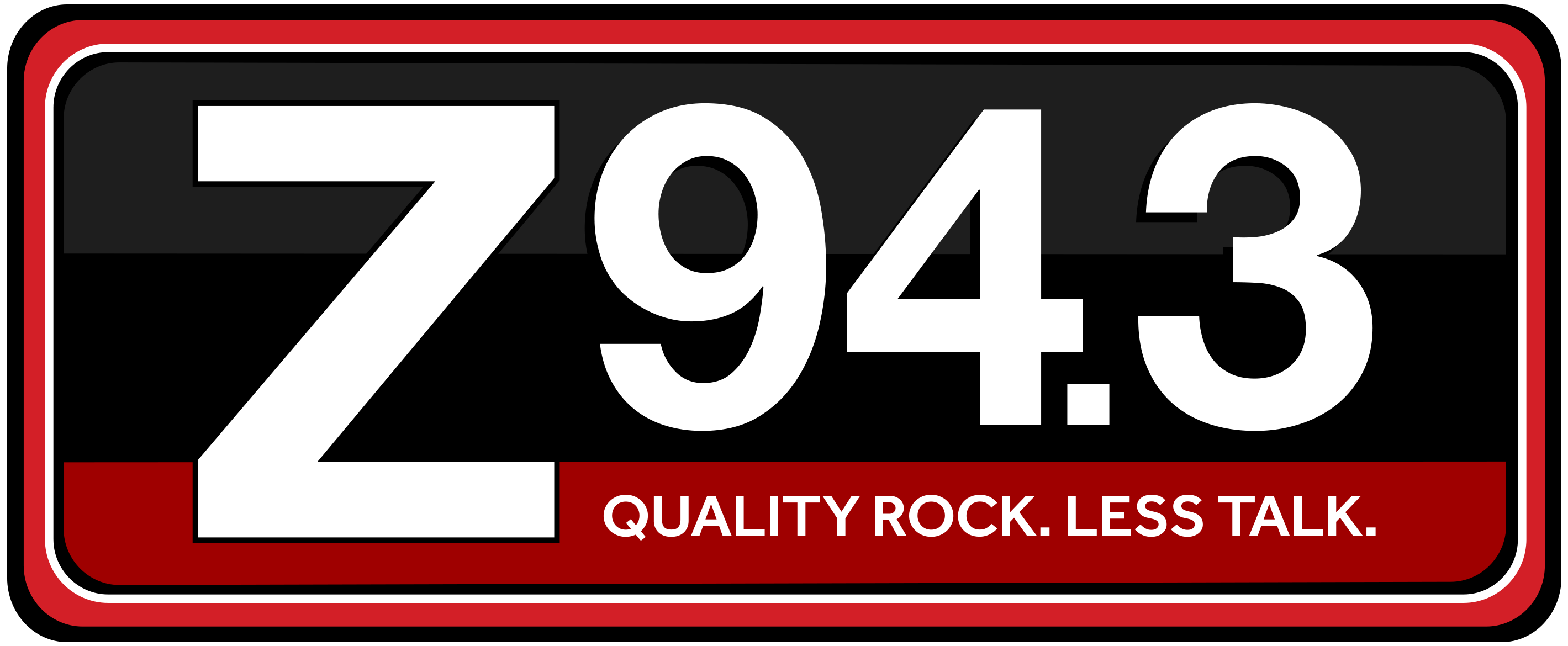
Logos as Z94.3

On February 28, 2014, after the station had shifted from an oldies format to a classic hits format, it was re-branded from "Oldies 94.3" to "Z94.3".

In September 2015, Schurz Communications, which previously held a minority interest in Douglas Road Radio, agreed to acquire full ownership of the company. The transaction was part of the $442.5 million acquisition of Schurz' broadcast interests, including WZOC, by Gray Television. Though Gray initially intended to keep Schurz' radio stations, on November 2, it announced that Mid-West Family Broadcasting would acquire WZOC and Schurz' other South Bend radio stations for $5.5 million. The sale to Mid-West was consummated on February 16, 2016.

In February 2022, WZOC shifted its format from classic hits to classic rock.

=== WYRX-FM ===
In mid-December 2024, the station quietly changed its call sign to WYRX-FM. The change was a prelude to a switch to a South Bend-oriented simulcast of the mainstream rock format of WIRX in St. Joseph, Michigan, at 7 p.m. on January 6, 2025.

WYRX is an affiliate of the weekly syndicated Pink Floyd show "Floydian Slip."
