= Jeff M. Fettig =

American businessman (born 1957)

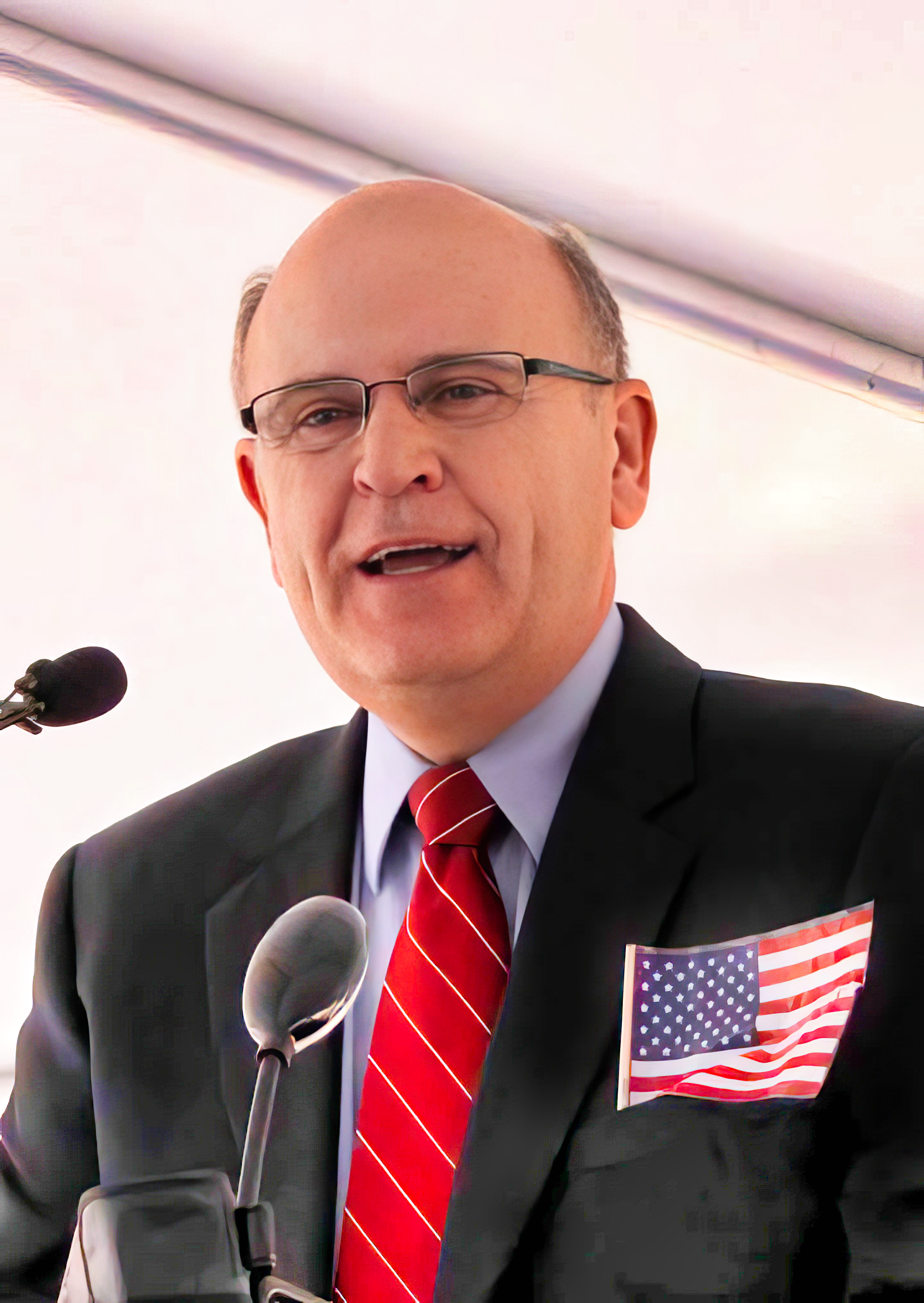
- Born: 1957 (age 68–69)
- Education: Indiana University (1979); Indiana University's Kelley School of Business (1981)
- Occupation: Business executive
- Employer: Dow Inc
- Known for: former Whirlpool Corporation chair and CEO
- Title: Company director
- Website: Fettig at Dow.com

Jeff M. Fettig (born 1957) is an American businessman. He is the former chairman and chief executive officer of the Whirlpool Corporation and serves on the board of directors for Dow Inc., the Indiana University Foundation, and is a PGA REACH Trustee.

== Early life ==
Fettig was born in 1957. He grew up on a farm in Tipton, Indiana, with eight siblings. He graduated Indiana University, where he earned a bachelor of science in finance in 1979 and a master in business administration from its Kelley School of Business in 1981.

== Career ==
Fettig joined the Whirlpool Corporation as a marketing management trainee in 1981. He was its executive vice president and the president of Whirlpool Europe and Asia, from 1994 to 1999, then its president and chief operating officer, from 1999 to 2004. Fettig was chairman and CEO, from 2004 to 2018, earning $14.4 million in 2010, and $7.33 million in 2012, and resigning from Whirlpool as of December 31, 2018.

Fettig has served on the board of directors of the Dow Chemical Company since 2003. He is a member of the Business Leaders for Michigan. He serves on the board of governors of the Boys and Girls Clubs of America.

In April 2017, Fettig was criticized by François Ruffin for planning to close down a Whirlpool factory in Amiens, France, and opening a new one in Poland, where salaries are lower, while raising shareholder dividends by 10%. The factory closure became an issue in the 2017 French presidential election, with Marine Le Pen and Emmanuel Macron visiting the factory before the second round.

In October 2017, Fettig was succeeded as CEO by Marc Bitzer; however he kept his role as chairman of Whirlpool, until the end of 2018.

== Personal life ==
Fettig resides in St. Joseph, Michigan. He is a political contributor to the Republican Party.
