= WCSY-FM =

- South Haven, Michigan; United States
- Broadcast area: Benton Harbor, Michigan
- Frequency: 103.7 MHz
- Branding: Cosy Classic Hits 103.7

Programming
- Format: Classic hits
- Affiliations: Michigan Radio Network; Premiere Networks

Ownership
- Owner: Mid-West Family Broadcasting
- Sister stations: WQYQ,WSJM-FM,WRRA-FM,WCXT,WIRX

History
- First air date: 1996
- Former call signs: WAFU (1993–1995); WZTY (1995–2000); WYTC (2000–2002); WZBL (2002–2004); WSPZ (2004–2005); WSPZ-FM (2005); WHIT-FM (2005–2008); WCSY (2008)
- Call sign meaning: "Cozy"

Technical information
- Licensing authority: FCC
- Facility ID: 57954
- Class: A
- ERP: 3,000 watts
- HAAT: 100 meters (330 ft)
- Transmitter coordinates: 42.301°N 86.251°W

Links
- Public license information: Public file; LMS
- Webcast: Listen Live
- Website: wcsy.com

WCSY-FM (103.7 FM) is a radio station broadcasting a classic hits format. Licensed to South Haven, Michigan, United States, the station serves the Benton Harbor-Saint Joseph area.

WCSY-FM has filed a construction permit to move its community of license from Hartford, Michigan to South Haven, Michigan; it was granted in February 2008. On January 7, 2008, the station changed its branding to "103.7 Cosy-FM". The WCSY call letters were moved to the 103.7 FM frequency from 98.3 on January 17, 2008, which in turn changed call letters to WCXT-FM. The call sign was modified to "WCSY-FM" on November 10, 2008.

== Old logo ==
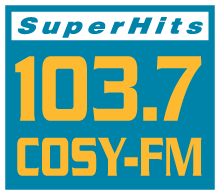
