= Marc Bitzer =

German businessman

- Born: c. 1965; Balingen, Germany
- Education: University of St. Gallen
- Occupation: Business executive
- Children: 2

Marc Bitzer (born c. 1965) is a US-based German business executive. He is the chief executive officer of the Whirlpool Corporation.

== Early life ==
Bitzer was born circa 1965 in Balingen, Baden-Württemberg, Germany. He grew up in Germany and Switzerland, and he earned a master in business administration from the University of St. Gallen.

== Career ==
Bitzer began his career as a management consultant for Boston Consulting Group, retiring as a vice president in 1999.

Bitzer joined Whirlpool in 1999. He was senior vice president for marketing, sales and services for its European subsidiary from 2000 to 2006, and president of the European subsidiary from 2006 to 2009. He was president of its U.S. subsidiary from 2009 to 2013. He was the head of its EMEA division from 2013 to 2016. He was appointed as its president and chief operating officer in October 2016, when he also became a board director. He succeeded Jeff M. Fettig as its chief executive officer in October 2017.

Bitzer is a member of the American Council on Germany.

== Personal life ==
Bitzer has a wife and two children. They reside in St Joseph, Michigan.
