= WQYQ =

Radio station in St. Joseph, Michigan, United States

- St. Joseph, Michigan; United States
- Broadcast area: St. Joseph
- Frequency: 1400 kHz
- Branding: Visit Southwest Michigan Radio 106.1 FM

Programming
- Format: Tourist information

Ownership
- Owner: Mid-West Family Broadcasting; (Mid-West Family Marketing and Media)
- Operator: Visit Southwest Michigan
- Sister stations: WCSY-FM; WCXT; WIRX; WRRA-FM; WSJM-FM

History
- First air date: November 24, 1956
- Former call signs: WSJM (1956–2020)

Technical information
- Licensing authority: FCC
- Facility ID: 74004
- Class: C
- Power: 880 watts
- Transmitter coordinates: 42°5′3.1″N 86°26′38.1″W
- Translator: 106.1 W291DK (St. Joseph)

Links
- Public license information: Public file; LMS
- Webcast: Listen live
- Website: swmichigan.org

WQYQ (1400 AM) is a radio station broadcasting a tourist info format. Licensed to St. Joseph, Michigan, it first began broadcasting in 1956 as WSJM. Programming is simulcast on a local FM translator on W291DK 106.1 FM Benton Harbor.

== History ==
WSJM went on the air on November 24, 1956. Until 1984, it had a country music format called "The Best in the Country".

Through the late 1980s and early 1990s, WSJM was a full service radio station, with an adult contemporary mixture of pop and oldies music, local personalities, network and local newscasts, evening talk programming (Bruce Williams and Larry King) and play-by-play sports. For many years, the station's slogan was "The Spirit of the Southwest".

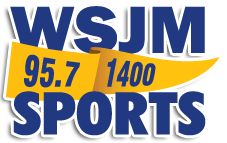
WSJM's logo under previous 95.7 translator

WSJM started simulcasting on 94.9 FM in early 2008. "The Coast", which had been on that frequency, then moved to 98.3 FM. The WCSY call letters were moved from 98.3 FM to 103.7 FM as part of this three station swap. The WSJM-FM call sign were temporarily placed on 98.3 FM until all moves were complete. "The Coast" changed call letters a few weeks later from "WCNF" to "WCXT". In August 2014, WSJM broke from the simulcast with WSJM-FM for a sports format. The programming was a mix of Fox Sports Radio, regional sports talk, and local and national play-by-play.

On July 20, 2020, WSJM switched from sports to alternative rock, exclusively only mentioning the frequency of the FM translator station. The station changed its call sign to WQYQ at the same time.

On February 20, 2025, WQYQ flipped to a simulcast of sports-formatted WSBT.

On January 26, 2026, W291DK changed its format to tourist information and seasonal music.
