= WIRX =

Coordinates: 42.072°N 86.371°W

- St. Joseph, Michigan; United States
- Broadcast area: Benton Harbor, Michigan
- Frequency: 107.1 MHz (HD Radio)
- Branding: WIRX

Programming
- Format: Mainstream rock
- Affiliations: Detroit Lions Radio Network

Ownership
- Owner: Mid-West Family Broadcasting; (WSJM, Inc.)
- Sister stations: WCSY-FM; WCXT; WQYQ; WRRA-FM; WSJM-FM

History
- First air date: June 20, 1966 (as WSJM-FM)
- Former call signs: WSJM-FM (1965–1969)
- Call sign meaning: Music Works

Technical information
- Licensing authority: FCC
- Facility ID: 74005
- Class: A
- ERP: 1,200 watts
- HAAT: 152 meters (499 ft)
- Repeater: 94.3 WYRX-FM (Plymouth, Indiana)

Links
- Public license information: Public file; LMS
- Webcast: Listen live
- Website: www.wirx.com

WIRX (107.1 FM) is a mainstream rock radio station owned by Mid-West Family Broadcasting located in Benton Harbor, Michigan. The station's city of license is St. Joseph, Michigan broadcasting in HD from a tower at the edge of Benton Township, Michigan. Its programming is also simulcast to the South Bend–Mishawaka metropolitan area on WYRX-FM (94.3) in Plymouth, Indiana.

== History ==
According to the "History of 107.1 FM St. Joseph", the 107.1 frequency was started as a music outlet to sister station WSJM in 1964 by Mid-West Family Broadcasting (MWF), which is based in Madison, Wisconsin. WSJM-FM began broadcasting in stereo on 107.1 MHz in 1965 and regularly provided stereo remote broadcasts by the Twin Cities Symphony and other events.

In 1969, the station changed its call letters to WIRX and switched to a completely jockless, automated Country format, tagged "WIRX Country".

In 1979, WYRX introduced an AOR/Top 40 ("Rock 40") format as "Rock 107 WIRX, The Music Works", playing artists from both the current and past years of rock.

The station switched its format slightly to a more AC-leaning rock format and was rebranded as "Magic 107 WIRX" with Jim Gifford and The Champions of Breakfast as the morning show.

Previous logo

WIRX returned to "Rock 107 WIRX" in 1991 and began running a mainstream rock format which it continues to do to this day.

Former program directors include Jim Gifford, Brian Maloney, Shelley Morgan, and Robb Rose.

The station is managed on a local level to this day, much as it was when it first came on the air.

On January 6, 2025, Mid-West Family Broadcasting began simulcasting to the South Bend–Mishawaka metropolitan area on WYRX-FM (94.3) in Plymouth, Indiana, which had previously offered a classic rock format.

WIRX is an affiliate of the weekly syndicated Pink Floyd show "Floydian Slip."

== Morning shows ==
The station has had several morning shows over the last decade. Hosts have included John Jay with Brother Phil, the syndicated Free Beer and Hot Wings, The Jason Lee show featuring Hunter, Rex Charger, and the "Plan B Morning Show" with Brock Havens. When the station began simulcasting on WYRX-FM in 2025, WIRX began airing the syndicated Bob & Tom Show, which WYRX (as WZOC) had already been airing in South Bend.
