= WRRA-FM =

Coordinates: 41.989°N 86.529°W

- Bridgman, Michigan; United States
- Broadcast area: St. Joseph, Michigan
- Frequency: 97.5 MHz
- Branding: Quality Rock 97.5 The Lake

Ownership
- Owner: Mid-West Family Broadcast Group; (WSJM Inc)
- Sister stations: WCSY-FM; WCXT; WIRX; WQYQ; WSJM-FM

History
- First air date: 1993
- Former call signs: WCSE (1992–1995); WYTZ (1995–2025)

Technical information
- Licensing authority: FCC
- Facility ID: 17734
- Class: A
- ERP: 3,800 watts
- HAAT: 126 meters (413 ft)

Links
- Public license information: Public file; LMS
- Webcast: player.listenlive.co/72681
- Website: www.qualityrock975thelake.com

WRRA-FM (97.5 FM, "Quality Rock 97.5 The Lake") is a radio station broadcasting a classic rock format. Licensed to Bridgman, Michigan, it first began broadcasting under the WCSE call sign.

== History ==
On February 17, 2025, WYTZ changed its call sign to WRRA-FM; concurrently, sister station WQLQ became WYTZ-FM. As part of a shuffle of multiple Mid-West Family stations, on March 4, 2025, WYTZ's country format and "Y Country" branding would move to the former WQLQ. Subsequently, the alternative format and "Live" branding that were on WQLQ moved to WCXT, replacing that station's adult contemporary format, as well as South Bend translator W241AD (96.1 FM). 97.5 FM, in turn, would adopt the classic rock format and "Lake" branding that formerly aired on 99.9's HD2 sub-channel and translator W300EJ (107.9 FM).
