= WSJM-FM =

Coordinates: 42.072°N 86.371°W

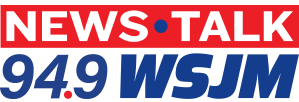
- Benton Harbor, Michigan; United States
- Frequency: 94.9 MHz
- Branding: News Talk 94.9

Programming
- Format: News-talk-sports
- Affiliations: ABC News Radio; Michigan News Network; Michigan IMG Sports Network; Fox Sports Radio; Detroit Tigers Radio Network; Detroit Lions Radio Network

Ownership
- Owner: Mid-West Family Broadcasting; (WSJM, Inc.)
- Sister stations: WCSY-FM; WCXT; WIRX; WQYQ; WRRA-FM

History
- First air date: 1998
- Former call signs: WYKL (1998–1999); WCNF (1999–2008)
- Call sign meaning: St. Joseph, Michigan

Technical information
- Licensing authority: FCC
- Facility ID: 74006
- Class: A
- ERP: 2,200 watts
- HAAT: 116 meters (381 ft)

Links
- Public license information: Public file; LMS
- Webcast: Listen live
- Website: www.wsjm.com

WSJM-FM (94.9 FM) is a commercial radio station licensed to Benton Harbor, Michigan, and also serving nearby St. Joseph. The station broadcasts a News/Talk/Sports radio format. It is owned by Mid-West Family Broadcasting with studios on East Napier Avenue in Southwest Benton Harbor.

WSJM is powered at 2200 watts and broadcasts from an antenna in Sodus Township near US-31. Its signal covers much of Michiana and can be heard as far south as South Bend, Indiana.

Programming includes a local morning talk show with syndicated news and sports programs the rest of the day. The WSJM call sign was first used on AM sister station WQYQ prior to the station's switch to alternative rock in 2020.

Most hours begin with an update from ABC News Radio. The station is also a partial affiliate of Fox Sports Radio. Play by play sports coverage comes from the Detroit Tigers Radio Network, Detroit Lions Radio Network, and Michigan Sports Network.

== History ==
The WSJM-FM callsign was originally assigned to 107.1 MHz in 1964 as a classical music outlet to sister station WSJM (which, at the time, had a "top-forty" rock-and-roll format) and owned by Mid-West Family Broadcasting (MWF), which is based in Madison, Wisconsin. The callsign was changed to WIRX in 1979 and became dormant until 2008. The station is still managed on a local level to this day, much as it was when it first began broadcasting.

It is thought that WSJM-FM was one of the world's first completely automated radio stations, built and designed by Brian Brown in 1963 when Brown was only 10 years old. The station broadcast in a classical format, called "More Good Music (MGM)" and five-minute bottom-of-the-hour news feeds from the Mutual Broadcasting System. The heart of the automation was an 8 x 24 telephone stepping relay which controlled two reel-to-reel tape decks, one twelve inch Ampex machine which provided the main program audio and a second RCA seven inch machine which provided "fill" music. The tapes that these machines played were originally produced in the MWF's Madison, Wisconsin production facility by WSJM Chief Engineer Richard E. McLemore (and later in-house at WSJM) with special sub-audible cue tones used to signal the end of a song. The stepping relay was "programmed" by slide switches in the front of the two relay racks which housed the equipment. The news feeds were triggered by a microswitch which was attached to a Western Union clock and tripped by the minute hand of the clock. and then reset the stepping relay. Originally, 20-minute station identification was accomplished by a simulcast switch in the control booth for sister station WSJM, whereupon the disc jockey in the booth would announce "This is WSJM AM and... (then pressing the momentary contact button) ...WSJM-FM, St. Joseph, Michigan." This only lasted about six months, however, and a standard tape cartridge player was wired in to announce the station identification and triggered by the Western Union clock.

The station callsigns had previously been WCNF "The Coast" until the station was moved to the 98.3 FM frequency (with new calls WCXT) on January 24, 2008, in a 3 station swap that started on January 7. The WCSY call letters as well as the "Cosy FM" name, which had been on the 98.3 FM frequency, were moved the 103.7 FM frequency. The WHIT-FM call letters were dropped from 103.7 FM, but the oldies format and "SuperHits" branding were retained.

The 94.9 facility first began broadcasting in 1998 as WYKL with an oldies format. Following competitor WHFB-FM's format change from hot AC to country, 94.9 FM changed to a hot AC format that lasted until the recent change. Mid-West Family Broadcasting owns all three stations involved in the format swap.

WSJM-FM formerly simulcasted with WSJM except for Fox Sports Radio programming on AM and for most weekend programs. The simulcast ended in late August 2014 when WSJM switched to all-sports; WSJM-FM's news/talk format continued as before.

Programming was consolidated between the AM and FM signals on July 20, 2020, when the AM format changed to alternative rock as WQYQ.
