= WYTZ-FM =

Coordinates: 41.962°N 86.351°W

- Benton Harbor, Michigan; United States
- Broadcast area: South Bend, Indiana
- Frequency: 99.9 MHz (HD Radio)
- Branding: 99.9 Y Country

Programming
- Format: Country
- Subchannels: HD2: LIVE 96.1 & 98.3 (alternative rock); HD3: Sunny Christmas (Christmas)
- Affiliations: Premiere Networks; United Stations Radio Networks

Ownership
- Owner: Mid-West Family Broadcasting; (WSJM, Inc.)
- Sister stations: WSBT; WNSN; WYRX-FM

History
- First air date: October 10, 1947 (as WHFB-FM)
- Former call signs: WHFB-FM (1947–2016); WQLQ (2016–2025)
- Call sign meaning: Y Country

Technical information
- Licensing authority: FCC
- Facility ID: 72175
- Class: B
- ERP: 50,000 watts
- HAAT: 124 meters (407 ft)
- Translator: HD2: 96.1 W241AD (South Bend) HD3: 107.9 W300EJ (Benton Harbor)

Links
- Public license information: Public file; LMS
- Webcast: {{ubl|FM/HD1: Listen live
- Website: www.999ycountry.com; HD2: www.everythingalt.com

WYTZ-FM (99.9 FM) is a country-formatted radio station licensed to Benton Harbor, Michigan, targeting the South Bend, Indiana, market. WYTZ-FM is owned by Mid-West Family Broadcasting. Its signal is regularly heard as far as Chicago, Illinois, and as far east as Battle Creek, Michigan.

== History ==
Logo as "New Country 99.9"

In June 2011, WHFB-FM re-imaged from "Cat Country 99-9" to "Real Country 99-Nine". Previous to the country format, the then-WHFB-FM acted as a local station serving the Benton Harbor/St. Joseph area, with beautiful music and adult contemporary music formats.

In September 2015, Schurz Communications, which previously held a minority interest in Douglas Road Radio, agreed to acquire full ownership of the company. The transaction was part of the $442.5 million acquisition of Schurz' broadcast interests, including WHFB-FM, by Gray Television. Though Gray initially intended to keep Schurz' radio stations, on November 2, it announced that Mid-West Family Broadcasting would acquire WHFB-FM and Schurz' other South Bend radio stations for $5.5 million. Mid-West Family already owned several stations in the Benton Harbor-St. Joseph area, where the station's city of license is located. The sale to Mid-West was consummated on February 16, 2016.

Upon acquiring the station, Mid-West Family announced on October 4, 2016, that WHFB-FM would flip to contemporary hit radio as "Live 99.9" on October 11. The station began stunting with TV show theme songs on October 7, 2016, which ended with the noon launch on the aforementioned date. The call sign was changed on October 12, 2016, to WQLQ.

On July 24, 2024, WQLQ shifted to alternative rock, retaining the "Live" branding but using the new slogan "The Alternative".

The call sign was changed to WYTZ-FM on February 17, 2025; the WYTZ call sign had previously been used on sister station WRRA-FM and WLS-FM.

As part of a shuffle of multiple Mid-West Family stations, on March 4, 2025, the alternative format and "Live" branding moved to WCXT, replacing that station's adult contemporary format, as well as South Bend translator W241AD (96.1 FM). 99.9 FM, in turn, would adopt 97.5 FM's country format and "Y Country" branding. (Subsequently, that station would adopt the classic rock format and "Lake" branding that formerly aired on 99.9's HD2 sub-channel and translator W300EJ.)

== HD Radio ==
On January 30, 2019, WQLQ launched a classic rock format on its HD2 subchannel, branded as "95.7 The Lake" (simulcast on translator W239CJ 95.7 FM Benton Harbor). In April 2024, the station moved from 95.7 to 107.9 FM.

On June 28, 2021, WQLQ launched a country music format on its HD3 channel, branded as "96.1 The Ton" (simulcast on translator W241AD 96.1 FM South Bend, Indiana). On July 22, 2024, WQLQ-HD3 and W241AD changed their format to a simulcast of sports-formatted WSBT.

== HD2 translator ==
WQLQ relays its HD2 subchannel on the following translator:

Broadcast translator for WYTZ-HD3
Call sign	Frequency	City of license	FID	ERP (W)	HAAT	Class	FCC info
W300EJ	107.9 FM	Benton Harbor, Michigan	156712	250	0 m (0 ft)	D	LMS
