= South Bend Tribune =

Daily newspaper and news website based in South Bend, Indiana

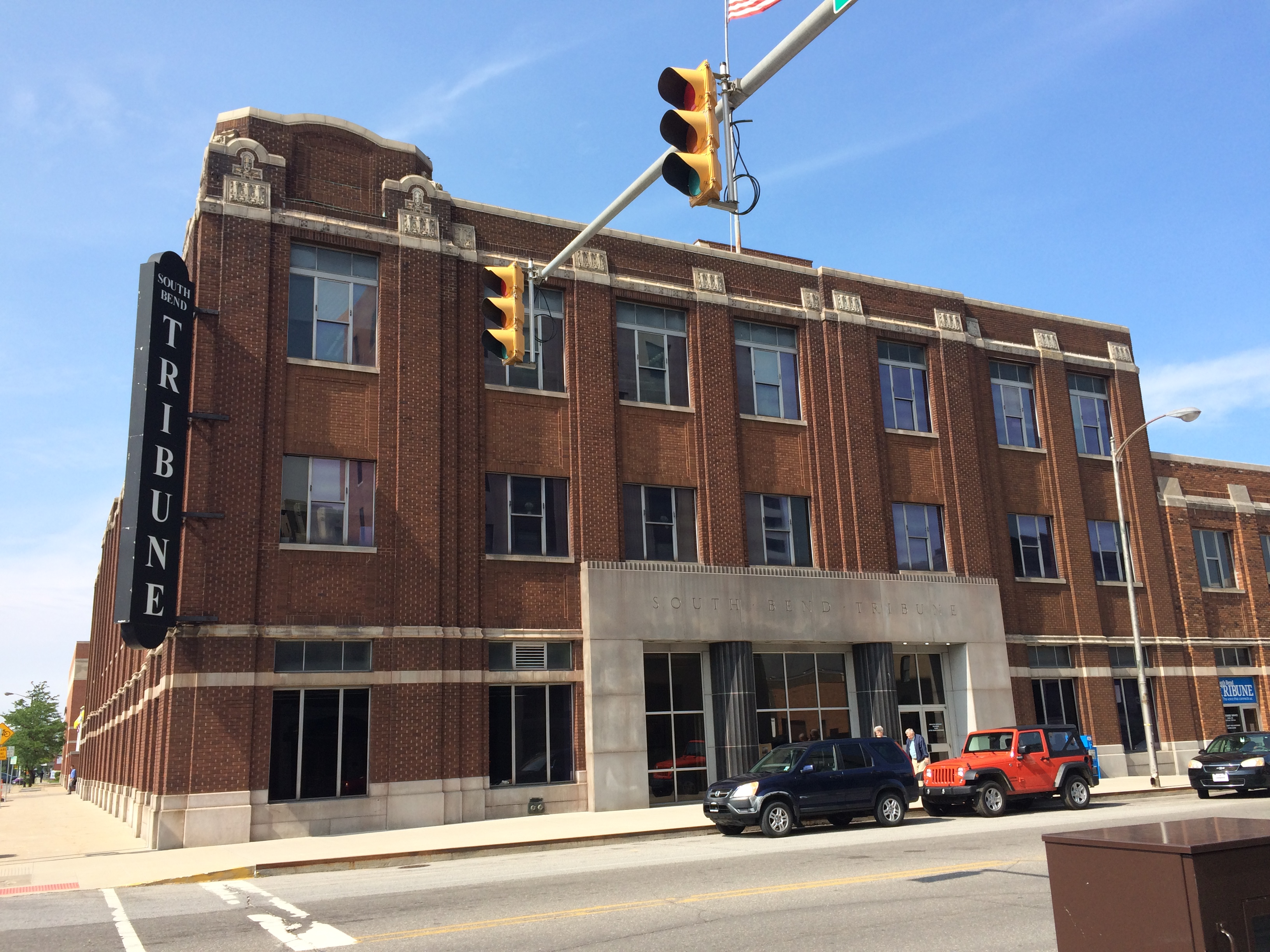
- The former South Bend Tribune building at 225 W. Colfax Ave. in downtown South Bend, Indiana. The newspaper moved out of the building in November 2019 after 98 years.
- Type: Daily newspaper
- Format: Broadsheet
- Owner: USA Today Co.
- Founder(s): Alfred B. Miller and Elmer Crockett
- Founded: 1872; 154 years ago
- Headquarters: (as of 2020) 635 S. Lafayette Blvd., Ste. 108; South Bend, Indiana 46601; United States
- OCLC number: 11193821
- Website: southbendtribune.com

The South Bend Tribune is a daily newspaper and news website which is based in South Bend, Indiana. It is distributed in South Bend, Mishawaka, north central Indiana, and southwestern Michigan. It has been named as a "Blue Ribbon Newspaper" (2006, 2016 and 2018) by the Hoosier State Press Association. It is the third largest daily broadsheet newspaper in the state of Indiana by circulation.

The Tribune was locally and family owned by Schurz Communications and based in Mishawaka, for more than 146 years, from its founding in 1872 until 2019. Five generations of the family owned and operated the newspaper until the Tribune was sold to GateHouse Media on February 1, 2019. In November 2019, GateHouse Media completed the purchase of the Gannett newspaper chain; the two combined newspaper chains use the Gannett name. On November 19, 2019, the South Bend Tribune became a Gannett newspaper.

Also in November 2019, the South Bend Tribune moved out of the Tribune Building at 225 W. Colfax Ave., which had been its home for 98 years. The Tribune Building was the newspaper's fourth location. The newspaper staff moved temporarily into Union Station Technology Center, 501 W. South St. in downtown South Bend, although most employees worked remotely during 2020 and early 2021 because of the coronavirus pandemic. In August 2020, the South Bend Tribune moved into its new home in a former Studebaker Corp. assembly plant at 635 S. Lafayette Blvd. that is being renovated by entrepreneur Kevin Smith as part of South Bend's Renaissance District. The newspaper is printed in Peoria.

Because the University of Notre Dame is in South Bend, the Tribune receives large readership through its Notre Dame news and sports coverage. The Tribune also operates the Notre Dame sports website "ND Insider".

Ismail Turay is the executive editor.

== History ==
=== Early years ===
Alfred B. ("Al" or "Alf") Miller and Elmer Crockett, Union veterans of the Civil War founded the Tribune in 1872 in South Bend, a manufacturing center on the St. Joseph River in northern Indiana. The Tribune was founded as a Republican newspaper.

Miller and Crockett had worked together earlier at the St. Joseph County Register, a weekly newspaper based in South Bend that was owned by Schuyler Colfax, who served as Speaker of the U.S. House of Representatives during the Civil War and then as vice president under Ulysses S. Grant. Miller was skilled in editing and writing, and Crockett was a mechanical man who handled the presses. The two were brothers-in-law; in 1868 Crockett married Miller's sister, Anna. The first four-page edition of the Tribune was published on a Saturday evening, March 9, 1872. The Tribune's original printing offices were at 73 and 75 West Washington St. in downtown South Bend. Two other men from the Register held minor partnership roles in the Tribune at the start, but left within a few years: James H. Banning, a printer, and Elias W. Hoover, a wood engraver.

In an editorial in the first edition, the editors wrote: "We know that in our four or five years' experience in the newspaper business in this city, its reading population has increased nearly one half, that the county has grown accordingly and that there is room for a journal like The Tribune, even more than there was room for two papers a dozen years ago. No city in the state is growing so rapidly as South Bend ..." The two men operated the Tribune together until Miller's death in 1892. The Tribune operated a book, stationery and art supply store in conjunction with the newspaper until 1902.

=== F.A. Miller ===
Frederick A. Miller, Alfred B. Miller's son, at age 24, became the Tribune's editor upon his father's death. The young Miller had started his career as a boy, learning to set type and carrying a route for the Tribune at age 12 in 1880, earning a 13-cent profit on the first day. He had graduated from South Bend High School in 1887 and on July 3 of that year joined his father's editorial staff. F.A. Miller served as editor and publisher of the Tribune from 1892 until his death at age 86 on November 29, 1954. In a political philosophy inherited from his Civil War veteran father, F.A. Miller "ran The Tribune as a straight forward Republican organ. Unless a Republican candidate was an atrocious choice, or tied to an organization that Miller found obnoxious, such as the Ku Klux Klan, he could count upon The Tribune's endorsement," the Tribune reported of Miller in its March 9, 1972, centennial edition.

Miller's editorial battles on the local scene were intense, especially against city administrations he regarded as corrupt, which tended to be Democratic. "In 1928 he conducted full scale war against the regime of Mayor Chester R. Montgomery, whom The Tribune accused of harboring gambling, liquor violations and prostitution," the Tribune reported in its centennial edition. Montgomery, fighting back, published a 76-page booklet as an open letter to the people of South Bend, titled "The Tribune F.A. Miller Menace." F.A. Miller hated mistakes in print. For years, there was a sign painted in large block letters on the newsroom wall, placed there by his orders, stating: "Be Accurate." He was exceedingly particular about the spelling of names, including the use of correct middle initials. Miller was a non-smoker and banned smoking at the Tribune, but did not object to other forms of tobacco use. He also objected to alcohol use and banned all forms of its advertising in the Tribune and WSBT and WSBT-TV, radio and televisions stations owned by the Tribune. Miller worked closely with Crockett, his father's original partner, until Crockett's death on June 3, 1924, at age 79. Miller received an honorary degree from the University of Notre Dame in 1950.

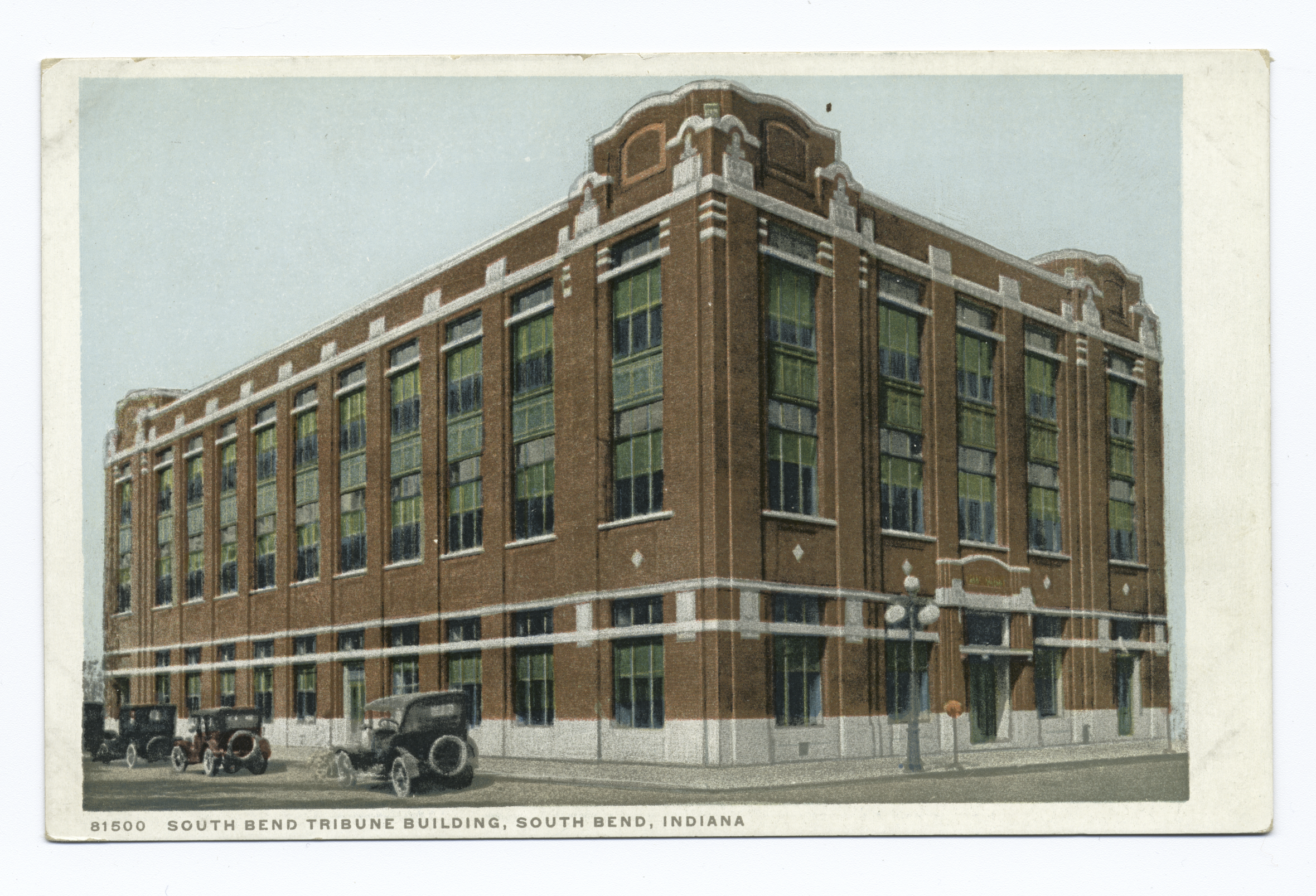
South Bend Tribune Building, postcard

In April 1921, the Tribune moved to a newly built headquarters at 225 W. Colfax Ave. (the newspaper's fourth location since its founding), a building that would be expanded several times and serve as the newspaper's home base for 98 years.

One of the first women reporters to earn a byline in the South Bend Tribune was Dorothea Kahn, a graduate of South Bend High School and the University of Chicago. She wrote a bylined feature story as a "girl reporter" about the November 4, 1922, Notre Dame vs. Indiana University football game. In May 1923, Kahn wrote a bylined, multi-part series about the "fast lives boys and girls of high school age are leading in South Bend" based on interviews with dozens of local youths. Kahn also served as the editor of the Tribune''s women's pages and helped with the launch of the Tribune's radio station. By 1924, Kahn was a reporter on the Chicago staff of The Christian Science Monitor and later had a long career in that newspaper's Boston office.

In 1921, the South Bend Tribune founded and began broadcasting from its own radio station. The station had the call letters WGAZ (for "Greatest Automotive Zone," a nod to the Studebaker vehicle company). The call letters later were changed to WSBT. The radio station's first studio was on the stage in the third-floor auditorium of The Tribune building.

=== Franklin Schurz Sr. ===
F.A. Miller and his wife had no children. When F.A. Miller died in 1954, his nephew, Franklin D. Schurz Sr., became the Tribune's publisher. Schurz already had worked for The Tribune company for nearly 30 years.

Schurz earned a bachelor's degree and a master's of business administration degree from Harvard University, with a break for service in the U.S. Army during World War I. A popular legend has it that Franklin Schurz Sr., the publisher and a nephew of Alfred Miller, took polka lessons, then sponsored weekly polka nights on South Bend's Polish west side. The social events were a huge hit and helped establish inroads for the newspaper in the immigrant community. Such community outreach and the newspaper's aggressive reporting helped push the Tribune past the other remaining daily newspaper in town, the South Bend News-Times. The News-Times published its last edition on December 27, 1938.

His son, Franklin Schurz Jr., succeeded him as the editor and publisher of the Tribune. Schurz Jr. joined the newspaper as an executive assistant in 1956, and later served as secretary, director, associate publisher, editor, publisher, executive vice president and president between 1972 and 1982, before the company's name changed to Schurz Communications.

In December 1963, Tribune reporter Jack Colwell broke the story that the Studebaker Corp. auto company would shut down its factory in South Bend that month. The plant's shuttering left 7,000 employees without work and was among the biggest blows ever to the city's economy. Studebaker had started as a blacksmith and wagon production shop in South Bend in 1852.

During the 1960s and 1970s, when the Fighting Irish football teams were among the nation's elite, sports editor Joe Doyle was a close confidant of coach Ara Parseghian. Forrest "Woody" Miller covered Irish men's basketball for decades, including the teams led by coach Digger Phelps.

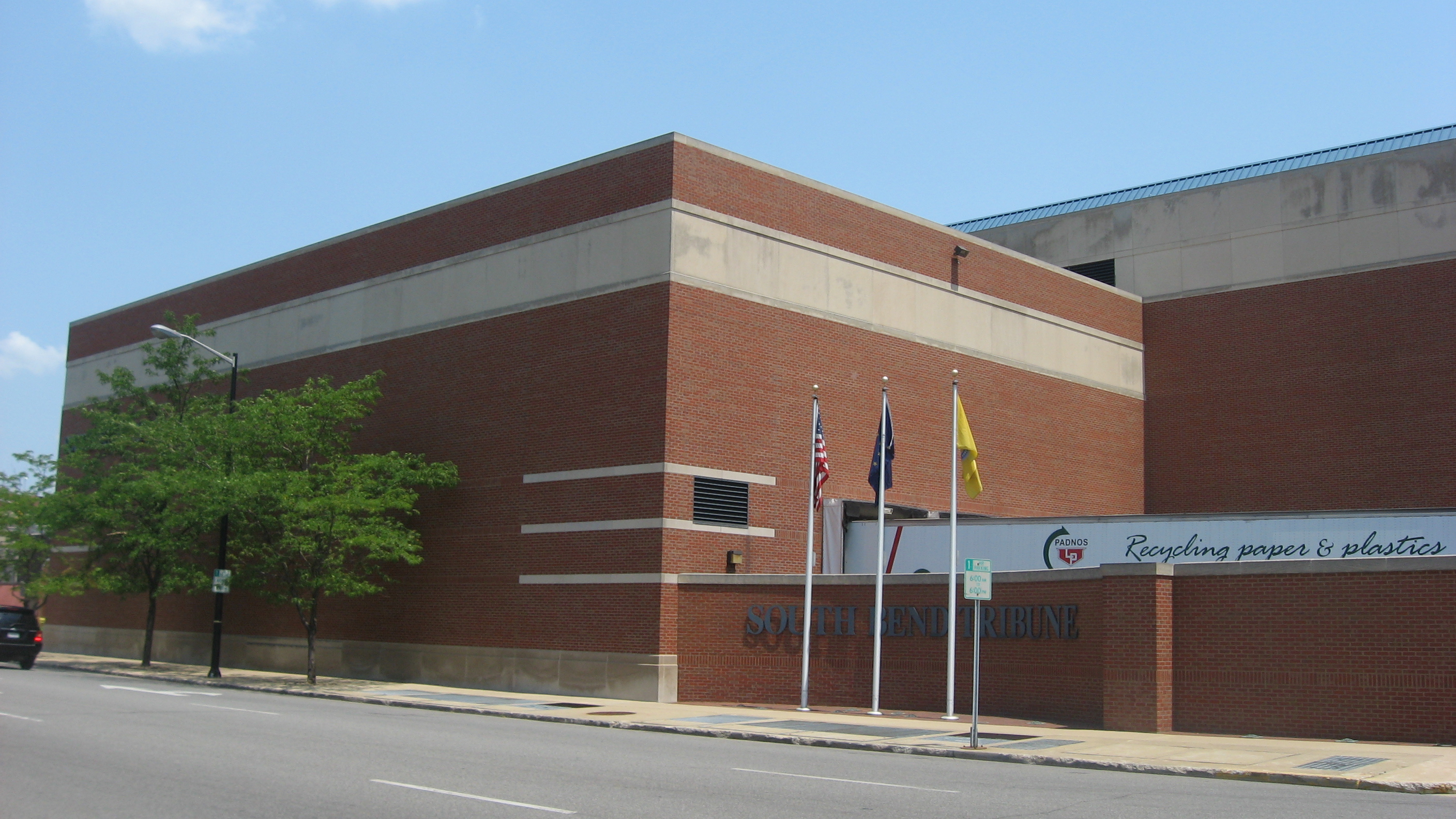
The South Bend Tribune's former press building at the southeast corner of LaSalle Avenue and Lafayette Boulevard.

Descendants of the founders served as editor and publisher for many years. Franklin Schurz Jr. succeeded his father after the Tribune's centennial in 1972; a recent past editor and publisher, the late David Ray, was a great-grandson of Elmer Crockett.

The Tribune has had a newsroom internship program since about 1960. The internship program was started by longtime Tribune managing editor John J. "Jack" Powers, a University of Notre Dame graduate. A native of Brooklyn, New York Powers graduated from the University of Notre Dame in 1952 and started working for the Tribune the same year. At age 29, he was named the Tribune''s managing editor, a position he held for 27 years before becoming executive editor and editorial writer.

Former South Bend Tribune reporting interns include David Haugh, a Chicago journalist and sports radio host; Madeline Buckley, a news reporter for the Chicago Tribune; Pervaiz Shallwani, senior editor of investigative/enterprise reporting at CNN; Daniel Cooreman, later a senior staff editor in the financial news department and Sunday Business section chief at The New York Times; Shannon Ryan, a sports writer at the Chicago Tribune; Mark Massa, an Indiana Supreme Court justice; and Paul C. Tash, chairman and CEO of the (Tampa Bay) Times Publishing Co. and chair of the Poynter Center for Media Studies' board of trustees.

=== Recent years ===
The Tribune in June 2017 shut down its presses and moved production to a newspaper facility in Walker, Michigan, and its printing location later moved to Indianapolis then Milwaukee. The Tribune reached a peak of more than 130,000 Sunday readers in the 1970s. By 2015, the Tribune''s circulation had fallen to 44,951.

The Tribune in recent years has placed great emphasis on breaking news on its website and reaching more readers through new web-based products and specialty magazines.

In 2019, the paper was sold by Schurz Communications along with the rest of its publishing division to GateHouse Media. President and CEO of Schurz Communications Todd F. Schurz wrote a column about the sale.

In late 2019, Gatehouse Media purchased Gannett, and the merged companies adopted the Gannett name. In July 2020, the Tribune shifted its printing to a Gannett facility in Indianapolis. In early 2021, the Tribune began printing in a Gannett facility in Milwaukee; it no longer prints in Indianapolis.

In March 2022, the Tribune moved to a six-day printing schedule, eliminating its printed Saturday edition.

In June 2024, the newspaper announced it will switch from carrier to postal delivery.
