= WSBT (AM) =

Coordinates: 41°37′0.17″N 86°13′1.02″W

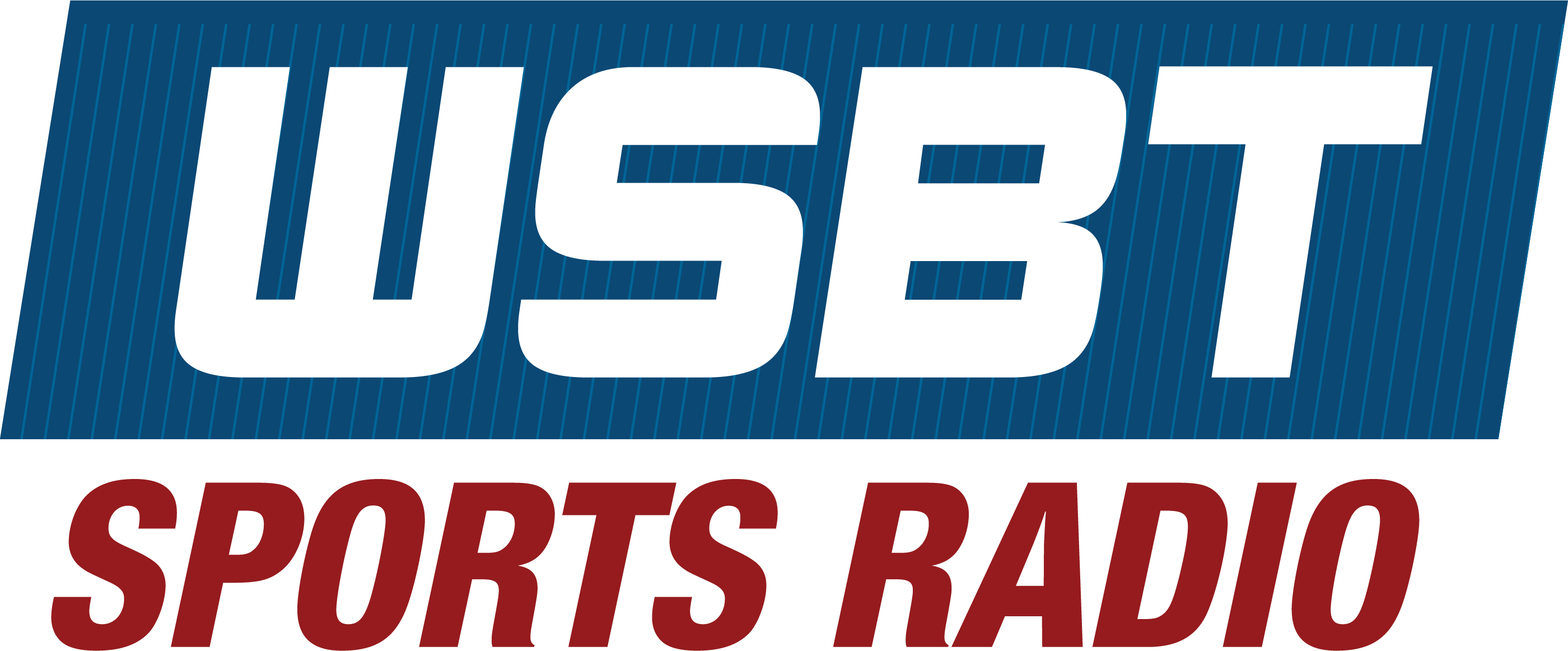
- South Bend, Indiana; United States
- Broadcast area: Michiana
- Frequency: 960 kHz
- Branding: Sports Radio WSBT

Programming
- Format: Sports
- Affiliations: Fox Sports Radio; Infinity Sports Network; Notre Dame Fighting Irish; South Bend Cubs

Ownership
- Owner: Mid-West Family Broadcasting; (WSJM, Inc.)
- Sister stations: WNSN; WYRX-FM; WYTZ-FM

History
- First air date: July 3, 1922 (as WGAZ)
- Former call signs: WGAZ (1922–1925)
- Call sign meaning: South Bend Tribune (original owner)

Technical information
- Licensing authority: FCC
- Facility ID: 73985
- Class: B
- Power: 5,000 watts
- Translator: 96.1 W241AD (South Bend)
- Repeater: 99.9 WYTZ-FM HD2 (Benton Harbor, Michigan)

Links
- Public license information: Public file; LMS
- Webcast: Listen live
- Website: www.wsbtradio.com

WSBT (960 kHz, "Sports Radio WSBT") is a commercial radio station in South Bend, Indiana, which airs a sports radio format. It is owned by Mid-West Family Broadcasting, with studios and offices on East Monroe Street in downtown South Bend.

WSBT broadcasts at 5,000 watts, using different day and night directional antenna patterns to protect other stations on AM 960. The transmitter site is located in the southern portion of South Bend, off Ironwood Road. With a good radio, WSBT's signal can be picked up from Lake Michigan to Fort Wayne.

== Programming ==
WSBT is the flagship station for University of Notre Dame football and men's basketball, as well as the South Bend Cubs.

== History ==
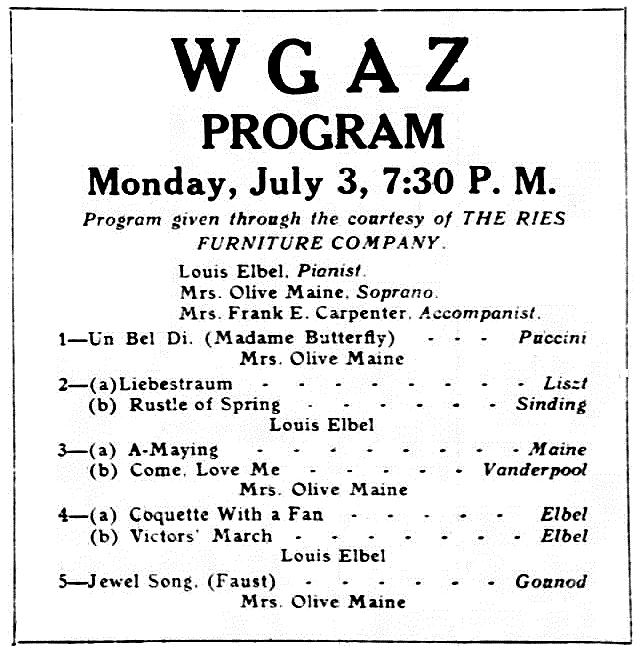
The station made its debut broadcast, as WGAZ, on July 3, 1922.

On December 1, 1921, the U.S. Department of Commerce, in charge of radio at the time, adopted a regulation formally establishing a broadcasting station category, which set aside the wavelength of 360 meters (833 kHz) for entertainment broadcasts, and 485 meters (619 kHz) for farm market and weather reports. On June 29, 1922, the South Bend Tribune was issued a license for a new station on the shared 360 meter "entertainment" wavelength. The original call letters, WGAZ, were randomly assigned from a sequential roster of available call signs, and the station was one of 19 new stations that month that were issued call signs starting with "WGA". Because South Bend was the home of the Studebaker automobile company, it was suggested that "World's Greatest Automotive Zone" was an appropriate slogan based on these call letters. WGAZ was South Bend's second commercial radio station, after WBAQ, licensed to Myron L. Harmon and located at the YMCA building, which was first licensed on April 29, 1922, and deleted on November 7, 1922.

WGAZ made its formal debut broadcast starting at 7:30 p.m. on July 3, 1922. The program, "given through the courtesy of the Ries Furniture Company", featured local musical performers. On September 9, 1925, the call letters became WSBT, reflecting its ownership by the South Bend Tribune. Throughout the 1920s, WSBT was assigned to various transmitting frequencies, until November 11, 1928, when, as part of a nationwide reallocation under the provisions of the Federal Radio Commission's General Order 40, the station was assigned to 1230 kHz on a timesharing basis with WFBM in Indianapolis and WCWK in Fort Wayne.

Starting in 1932 WSBT was a CBS Radio Network affiliate, carrying dramas, comedies, news, sports, soap operas, game shows and big band broadcasts during the "Golden Age of Radio". The station moved to 1360 kHz in 1934, with a power of 500 watts. In 1940, WSBT moved again, to 930 kHz, which ended its timesharing with WGES in Chicago on its old frequency. One condition of this reassignment was that the Tribune end operation of a companion station, WFAM on 1200 kHz. With the implementation of North American Regional Broadcasting Agreement (NARBA) in March 1941, stations on 930 kHz, including WSBT, moved to 960 kHz. In 1942 the transmitter power was increased to 1,000 watts, and in 1947 WSBT increased its power to the current 5,000-watt output.

=== WSBT-FM and WSBT-TV ===
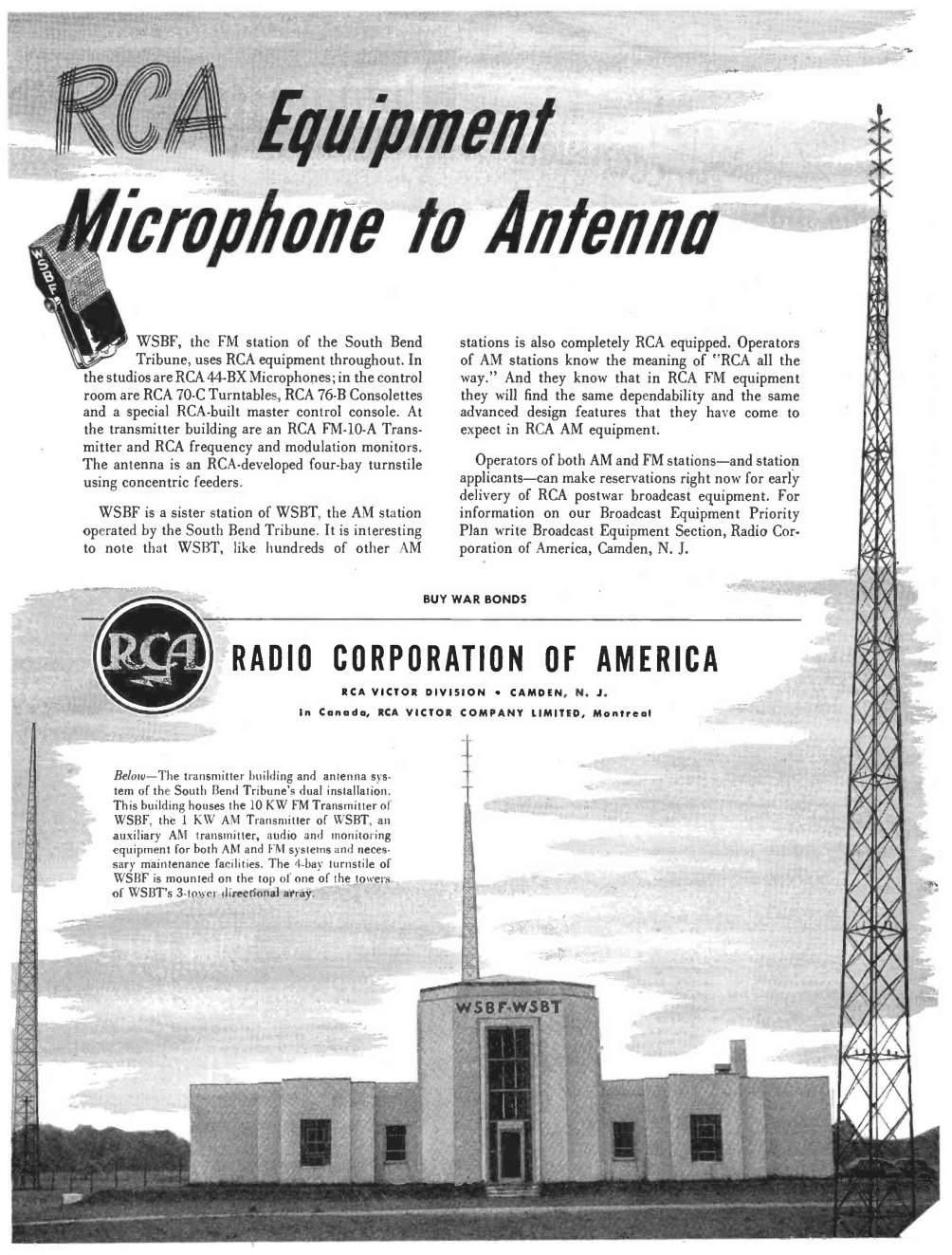
1945 RCA advertisement featuring WSBT and its then-FM companion station, WSBF.

There have been two different FM stations that have had the call letters WSBT-FM. On May 24, 1940, the Federal Communications Commission (FCC) announced the establishment, effective January 1, 1941, of an FM radio band operating on 40 channels spanning 42–50 MHz. The Construction Permit assigned to the Tribune specified operation on 47.1 MHz, and the call sign W71SB. However, W71SB's co-ownership with the Tribune resulted in a delay, after the FCC began an investigation as to whether newspaper ownership of radio stations should be restricted. Thus, W71SB was one of six stations that was under the stipulation "that no construction facilities shall be undertaken or completed until the Commission has acted on the general newspaper-ownership question". On June 9, 1941, W71SB's construction permit was reinstated, pending the outcome of the newspaper ownership review, and the station began broadcasting in May 1943.

The FCC later modified its rules for FM station call signs, and on November 1, 1943, W71SB became WSBF. After the FM band was moved to 88-108 MHz, WSBF was reassigned to 101.3 MHz. In 1949 the call letters were changed again, to WSBT-FM. This original WSBT-FM discontinued operations at midnight on January 31, 1950, and turned its license in for cancellation. Station manager Robert H. Swinrz noted that, a year after WSBT-FM had begun fulltime duplication of WSBT programming, "a survey had shown that only a comparatively few radio owners have facilities for FM reception and only a negligible number listen to FM for more than a short time daily".

On December 22, 1952, WSBT-TV first signed on, originally on channel 34, and later moving to channel 22. WSBT-TV was one of the first stations to broadcast on the newly created UHF band, thus most existing TV sets, which were designed only for reception on the original VHF band, needed a converter installed before they could pick up its signals. Because the AM station was a CBS Radio affiliate, WSBT-TV was primarily affiliated with CBS Television.

A second WSBT-FM, this time on 101.5 MHz, was later authorized, and, twelve years after the original WSBT-FM shut down, started broadcasting on August 12, 1962. At first it simulcast WSBT. In the late 1960s, WSBT-FM began separate programming, airing beautiful music. In 1984, the station switched to locally programmed adult contemporary music, with the call letters becoming WNSN, as "Sunny 101.5".

=== Talk and sports ===
As network programming moved to TV, WSBT switched to a full service middle of the road format of popular music, news and sports. When music listening switched from AM to FM, WSBT began adding more talk programming and reducing music. By the 1990s, the station was all talk, sports and news. Then as the station moved through the 2010s, WSBT shifted to more sports programming, with the talk shows reduced.

Schurz Communications announced on September 14, 2015, that it would exit broadcasting and sell its television and radio stations, including WSBT, to Gray Television for $442.5 million. The sale, which ended 93 years of ownership by the company, separated WSBT radio from both the South Bend Tribune (which Schurz initially kept), and WSBT-TV (which was sold separately due to Gray's existing ownership of WNDU-TV). Though Gray initially intended to keep Schurz' radio stations, on November 2, it announced that Mid-West Family Broadcasting would acquire WSBT and Schurz' other South Bend radio stations for $5.5 million. The sale to Mid-West was consummated on February 16, 2016.

On January 10, 1994, WSBT Radio debut a daily sports talk show with Tom Denin and John Fineran. Today the show airs from 5-7pm(ET) with Darin Pritchett as the host. The show focus on local sports, specifically Notre Dame athletics.

=== FM translator ===
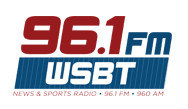
Logo used during WSBT's simulcast on 96.1 FM

On March 30, 2012, WSBT began broadcasting on an FM translator (W241AD) at 96.1 MHz in South Bend. The translator had previously been owned and operated by Friends of Christian Radio, Inc. and repeated the Christian contemporary programming of 104.7 WFRN-FM in Elkhart. It served mainly to fill in the gaps in WSBT's nighttime signal. WSBT changes to a different directional pattern after sunset, resulting in marginal nighttime coverage outside St. Joseph County.

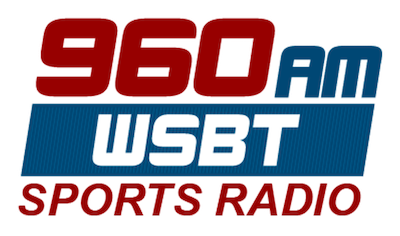
Logo before reuniting with the translator

On June 28, 2021, W241AD dropped its simulcast with WSBT (leaving WSBT as AM only) and launched a country music format, branded as "96.1 The Ton", with WQLQ-HD3 as the originating station.

On July 23, 2024, W241AD has dropped the country music format and returned to simulcast with WSBT with the addition of WQLQ-HD3.

== Past and present personalities ==
- Darin Pritchett
- John Hoffman
- Jim Irizarry
- Tim Grauel

Past local personalities have included:

- Jon Thompson ("J.T.") was the longtime morning host. His last broadcast was on March 2, 2018.
- Denis Prior and Shelli Harmon hosts of the "Noon News".
- Bob Lux (news)
- Eric Hansen
- Joan Swanson
- Brett Kuntz
- Chuck Whittaker (production director/fill-in)
- Bruce Kayser
- John Patrick Gall (News Director/news anchor)
- Joe Kelly (Program Director)
- Bruce Saunders (Weather)
- Joe Boland (sportscaster); founder of the Irish Football Network

== Past marketing campaigns and promotions ==
- WSBT Salute to Summer Broadcasts: Station personalities would broadcast live from sponsor locations and community events, often serving hot dogs and other snacks courtesy of Martin's Supermarkets.
- Wizzbit: This was a phrase used for various contests.
- Here's the Recipe for a Great Radio Station...: A marketing slogan used in claymation television commercials to promote WSBT's programming and personalities. A claymation chef would stand in front of a large mixing bowl, and add various "ingredients" to create WSBT.

== See also ==
WSBT-TV
