= WCXT =

Coordinates: 42.254°N 86.336°W

- Hartford, Michigan; United States
- Broadcast area: St. Joseph, Michigan
- Frequency: 98.3 MHz (HD Radio)
- Branding: 98.3 The Coast

Programming
- Format: Alternative rock (Modern AC-leaning)

Ownership
- Owner: Mid-West Family Broadcasting; (WSJM Inc)
- Sister stations: WCSY-FM; WIRX; WQYQ; WRRA-FM; WSJM-FM

History
- First air date: 1981
- Former call signs: WCSY-FM (1981–2008); WSJM-FM (2008); WCNF (2008
- Call sign meaning: Heritage calls of WHTS

Technical information
- Licensing authority: FCC
- Facility ID: 14012
- Class: A
- ERP: 3,700 watts
- HAAT: 130 meters (430 ft)

Links
- Public license information: Public file; LMS
- Webcast: Listen Live

WCXT (98.3 FM) is a radio station broadcasting an alternative rock/Modern AC format, serving the southwestern Michigan area. WCXT is licensed to Hartford, Michigan, and is focused on the cities of St. Joseph, Benton Harbor and South Haven. The station broadcasts in HD on 98.3-HD1 and is owned by Mid-West Family Broadcasting (WSJM, Inc.).

== History ==
It was announced on January 7, 2008, that the station would move from the 94.9 FM frequency to 98.3 FM, which had previously been the home of WCSY-FM and briefly WSJM-FM. The satellite-fed smooth jazz programming from Jones Radio Networks (now owned by Dial Global) that was part of WCSY-FM's "Cosy-FM" AC format continued after the move to 98.3 MHz. In 2009, the smooth jazz programming was dropped in favor of a live and local night show featuring the station's daytime format of hot AC.

The call letters were changed once again on February 8, 2008, from the 94.9 FM transferred WCNF to WCXT when the heritage call letters became available. The WCXT calls were used for many years on the 105.3 FM frequency in Hart, Michigan, which is now WHTS licensed to Coopersville and serving the Grand Rapids market.

Veteran air personalities included Phil McDonald, Robin Van Dyke, Jim Gifford, Robb Rose, and Tamisha Hill from the 94.9 The Coast era. Zack East, a former air personality on sister station WIRX and also at Big Rapids stations WYBR, WWBR and WBRN, hosted a music-intensive morning show on the station.

As part of a shuffle of multiple Mid-West Family stations, on March 4, 2025, the alternative format and "Live" branding moved to WCXT, as well as South Bend translator W241AD (96.1 FM), which resulted in the discontinuation of the adult contemporary format and "Coast" branding. 99.9 FM, in turn, would adopt 97.5 FM's country format and "Y Country" branding. (Subsequently, that station would adopt the classic rock format and "Lake" branding that formerly aired on 99.9's HD2 sub-channel and translator W300EJ.)

On March 31, 2026, it was announced that WCXT had reverted to the "98.3 The Coast" branding, while keeping the alternative format mostly intact, and adding some Modern AC (lighter alternative rock) elements.
