= WTDY =

WTDY may refer to:

- WTDY-FM, a radio station (96.5 FM) licensed to serve Philadelphia, Pennsylvania, United States
- WOZN (AM), a radio station (1670 AM) licensed to serve Madison, Wisconsin, United States, which held the call sign WTDY from 1998 to 2012
- WRIS-FM, a radio station (106.7 FM) licensed to serve Mount Horeb, Wisconsin, which held the call sign WTDY-FM from 2011 to 2012
- WLMV, a radio station (1480 AM) licensed to serve Madison, Wisconsin, which held the call sign WTDY from 1984 to 1998
