= WIBA =

WIBA may refer to:

- Women's International Boxing Association
- Women's International Baseball Association
- WIBA (AM), a radio station (1310 AM) licensed to Madison, Wisconsin, United States
- WIBA-FM, a radio station (101.5 FM) licensed to Madison, Wisconsin, United States
