= WTKM =

WTKM may refer to:

- WTKM-FM, a radio station (104.9 FM) licensed to serve Hartford, Wisconsin, United States
- WPTT (AM), a radio station (1540 AM) licensed to serve Hartford, Wisconsin, which held the call sign WTKM from 1951 to 2017
