= Tom Shanahan =

V. Thomas Shanahan (February 13, 1925 – March 10, 2014) was an American broadcaster.

== Personal life ==
Born in Milwaukee, Wisconsin, Shanahan attended Hi-Mount School, Steuben Junior High and then Washington High School. He served in the United States Army in World War II. He died in Wauwatosa, Wisconsin at age 89.

== Broadcasting career ==
While still in high school, Shanahan began working for WEMP in Milwaukee. After his time in the military, he returned to WEMP and remained there through the 1960s. He broadcast Milwaukee Brewers games alongside Mickey Heath and Earl Gillespie. In 1953, when Major League Baseball arrived in Milwaukee, Shanahan put together the first Milwaukee Braves broadcasting network. He also hosted a pregame show called Dugout Doings.

He also worked for WRIT-AM, WITI-TV, WCUB-AM, WHBL, WTKM-FM and WTKM, all Wisconsin-based stations.

In 2003, he was inducted into the Wisconsin Broadcasters Hall of Fame.
