= WOZN =

WOZN may refer to:

- WOZN (AM), a radio station (1670 AM) licensed to serve Madison, Wisconsin, United States
- WRIS-FM, a radio station (106.7 FM) licensed to serve Mount Horeb, Wisconsin, which held the call sign WOZN-FM from 2012 to 2017
- WCNK, a radio station (98.7 FM) licensed to serve Key West, Florida, United States, which held the call sign WOZN from 1984 to 1996
