= WIZM =

WIZM may refer to:

- WIZM (AM), a radio station (1410 AM) licensed to La Crosse, Wisconsin, United States
- WIZM-FM, a radio station (93.3 FM) licensed to La Crosse, Wisconsin, United States
