= WXXM =

Radio station in Sun Prairie–Madison, Wisconsin, United States

- Sun Prairie, Wisconsin; United States
- Broadcast area: Madison metropolitan area
- Frequency: 92.1 MHz (HD Radio)
- Branding: Rewind 92.1

Programming
- Format: Classic hits
- Affiliations: Premiere Networks

Ownership
- Owner: iHeartMedia; (iHM Licenses, LLC)
- Sister stations: WIBA (AM), WIBA-FM, WMAD, WTSO, WZEE

History
- First air date: April 12, 1972 (as WYXE)
- Former call signs: WYXE (1972–1979); WMAD (1979–2003)
- Call sign meaning: From the station's former MiX format (call letters also form an ambigram)

Technical information
- Licensing authority: FCC
- Facility ID: 17383
- Class: A
- ERP: 3,700 watts
- HAAT: 125 meters (410 ft)
- Transmitter coordinates: 43.169°N 89.261°W

Links
- Public license information: Public file; LMS
- Webcast: Listen live (via iHeartRadio)
- Website: rewind921.iheart.com

WXXM (92.1 FM) is a commercial radio station licensed to Sun Prairie, Wisconsin, and serving the Madison metropolitan area. The station is owned and operated by iHeartMedia, and broadcasts a classic hits radio format, switching to Christmas music for much of November and December. The station is noted for its runs as an alternative rock station during the 1980s and 1990s and as a progressive talk station in the 2000s and 2010s.

WXXM's studios and offices are located on Fish Hatchery Road in the Madison suburb of Fitchburg, and has a transmitter located off Brooks Drive in Sun Prairie.

== Station history ==
=== Top 40 (1972-197?) ===
The station first signed on the air on April 12, 1972, as WYXE. It was a stand-alone operation, initially airing Top 40 contemporary music along with some oldies music from the late 1950s and early 1960s on weekends and hourly news updates from ABC Radio.

=== Alternative (1970s-2002) ===
The station would segue to a mostly adult album alternative rock format in the late 1970s, and by 1979, would adopt the WMAD call sign (for "MADison").

Outside of a one-year silent period from June 1992 until June 1993 due to financial issues, WMAD programmed alternative rock music during much of the 1980s and 1990s, initially under a brand of mainly under the "Mad Radio" brand and/or some other variation that emphasized the M-A-D of the station's call sign. The station had decent ratings, though its lower-powered Class A signal did not saturate the market like many of the other local FM stations. (The station's current signal strength is concentrated on Madison's North and East sides, as well as the station's city of license, Sun Prairie.)

=== Modern adult contemporary (2002–2004) ===
With "Mad Radio's" ratings on the decline, Madison management at Clear Channel Communications (the company now known as iHeartMedia) dropped WMAD's alternative rock format on October 28, 2002. The station would become the modern adult contemporary-formatted "Mix 92.1," and emphasized a lighthearted presentation and a playlist that included the likes of Sheryl Crow, U2, and Dave Matthews Band. Alternative rock fans disappointed over the flip to "Mix" would take heart over a year later on December 31, 2003, when Clear Channel turned its struggling smooth jazz station at 96.3 FM into the new "Mad Radio", adding the WMAD call letters and alternative rock format, while 92.1 adopted the WXXM call letters. (The new "Mad Radio" at 96.3 was later replaced by country music on December 23, 2005, and resurfaced again in 2007 on WIBA-FM's HD Radio subchannel.)

=== Progressive talk (2004–2016) ===
WXXM's logo as "The Mic 92.1" (2004–2016)

"Mix 92.1" could not compete with similarly formatted stations in the market and its ratings were lower than that of the previous alternative format. During the week before Labor Day 2004, WXXM went jockless with announcements on the end of "Mix" and the launch of a progressive talk format and directing current "Mix" listeners to its CHR-formatted sister station, WZEE ("Z104").

At midnight on September 7, 2004 (when Len's "Steal My Sunshine" finished playing), "Mix 92.1" was no more. After several hours of stunting with left-leaning comedy bits, "The Mic 92.1" launched at 11:00 that morning with a CNN Radio hourly news update and Air America's "The Al Franken Show." Clear Channel was inspired to launch "The Mic" in Madison after experiencing success with progressive talk in several other markets. Clear Channel Madison management thought that the format would be ideal for the strongly liberal-leaning Madison market.

"The Mic 92.1" relied heavily on Air America Radio syndicated programming during its early months. Schedule adjustments eventually were made, including acquisitions of programs from non-AAR distributors, such as shows hosted by Ed Schultz, Stephanie Miller, and Mike Malloy (Malloy displaced original late evening host Phil Hendrie due to many requests from listeners). "The Mic's" reliance on Air America Radio dwindled over the years, with AAR programming being relegated to overnight and weekend hours by the time of AAR's Chapter 7 bankruptcy and shutdown in January 2010.

"The Mic" also added a local on-air presence. Madison-based writer Stu Levitan briefly hosted a late afternoon show during "The Mic's" early months. Later local shows included "Forward Forum," a Saturday morning show hosted by John Quinlan; "The Pro Show," a weekday morning program hosted by Lee Rayburn (with Jim Dick and later Jodie Shawback alongside as a sidekick); and 2-minute commentaries from Matthew Rothschild, editor of the Madison-based magazine The Progressive. Additionally, national hosts heard on "The Mic" broadcast shows originating from Madison's Barrymore theater, including Al Franken (2005), Stephanie Miller (2006), Ed Schultz, Laura Flanders, and Rachel Maddow (2007).

Although its ratings would ebb and flow during its history, "The Mic" enjoyed a loyal following among listeners in mostly progressive Madison. (In the Summer 2006 Arbitron ratings for the Madison market, WXXM ranked 11th of 25 stations overall, and the 2nd highest rated talk-formatted station in that survey.) On November 10, 2006, however, Clear Channel Madison made a controversial announcement that WXXM would change formats to all-sports on January 1, 2007. In its original announcement, management cited audience research that showed a desire among listeners for more coverage of local high school and college sports, as well as more live broadcasts of other sports programming that were tape-delayed on Clear Channel's other stations in the Madison market (including WIBA and the already sports-formatted WTSO), along with coverage of the Madison Mallards baseball team. (Clear Channel had won the team's broadcast rights, and planned to air the games on WXXM.) Jeff Tyler, the market manager for Clear Channel Madison, later admitted that other reasons contributed to the format change, including Air America Radio's financial problems as well as difficulty attracting advertisers to the progressive talk format, which in turn led to lower revenues generated by the station. (WXXM ranked last out of 14 Madison radio stations that reported earnings.) In relation to the announcement, "The Pro Show" was discontinued the week of November 10, 2006 (replaced by Air America's "The Young Turks"). "Forward Forum" was previously cancelled on October 28, 2006, and migrated to competing station WTDY.

The announcement of WXXM's format flip met with great notice, and for fans of "The Mic," great disdain. While some comments dismissed the flip as a case of progressive talk not being an attractive format for listeners or advertisers (the latter of which had been cited specifically by management), fans of the station expressed disappointment over the loss of a left-of-center viewpoint in Madison commercial talk radio. Words turned into action as one fan of "The Mic," Valerie Walasek, launched an online petition to persuade Clear Channel Madison to reverse its decision—a petition that surpassed its original goal of 5,000 signatures. Events in relation to Walasek's petition included a rally for "The Mic's" listeners and advertisers (which attracted an overflow crowd to the High Noon Saloon on December 12, 2006), and a "funeral procession" to Clear Channel's Madison headquarters on December 20, 2006, at which the petition was delivered to station management.

"The Mic's" proposed change reached national notice. Ed Schultz, a vocal proponent of the petition drive on his show, was among those suggesting that the format flip resulted from a lack of effort among management and salespeople at Clear Channel Madison to commit to the progressive talk format and to promote it to advertisers. Schultz even criticized Tyler by name on his show. Stephanie Miller featured Walasek on her program, while her show's resident impressionist, Jim Ward, performed a parody of what WXXM's sports format would sound like... an intentionally pedestrian play-by-play of girls' volleyball in a thick Wisconsin accent.

Jeff Tyler insisted that Clear Channel Madison would not waver from its plans to change WXXM to sports. But Walasek, her fellow "Mic" supporters, and advertisers continued the pressure, with supporters holding a mock "funeral" and delivering the "Save the Mic" petition to CC's Madison studios on December 20, 2006. On December 21, one day after the "funeral," Clear Channel Madison reversed its decision, stating that WXXM would retain its progressive talk format into 2007. Tyler confirmed the reversal in a message first played on air on December 22, 2006, indicating that management was "overwhelmed" by the support of fans, advertisers, and community leaders for The Mic. Tyler also confirmed that the station's agreement with Fox Sports Radio had to be ended in order for the reversal to take place. Additionally, The Jim Rome Show, which was slated to move from WTSO to WXXM, instead moved to Good Karma Broadcasting-owned WTLX at the beginning of 2007. WTLX aired Rome's show (and retained its Fox Sports Radio affiliation until 2009, when both moved to WTSO while WTLX took over ESPN Radio affiliation in the Madison market. WTLX also retained broadcasts of Madison Mallards baseball, a relationship that lasted until WOZN-AM/FM gained radio rights to the team in 2016.

In a move that left some "Mic" supporters disappointed, local weekday programming did not immediately return to WXXM after Clear Channel's reversal. Mike Ferris, FM operations manager for Clear Channel Madison, countered that WXXM's schedule would be "kind of in a holding pattern" until Air America's financial situation cleared up. However, on May 21, 2007, Lee Rayburn would return to host "The Mic's" 6-8AM weekday time slot. Rayburn did keep busy during his 6 months away from the station, including joining former "Pro Show" co-host Jodie Shawback on a series of podcasts from the Escape Java Joint in Madison; fill-in duties for Air America Radio hosts; and co-founding an online media company in Madison, Willy Street Media. Rayburn also worked a second evening show (Mondays thru Thursdays at 7PM) from September 2007 until early 2008. Local programming did immediately return to "The Mic's" weekend lineup, featuring the returns of "Progressive Forum" with Matthew Rothchild and "Sunday Journal" with host Stu Levitan (which would be rechristened "Books and Beats" by 2009). Other local shows that previously aired on "The Mic" included "The Recovery Zone," a Sunday morning programming that featured frank discussions about recovery from addictions, and "La Original," an all-Spanish-language music program broadcast on Friday and Saturday nights in 2007 and early 2008.

Concurrent with supporters' claims during the "Save The Mic" drive, WXXM's advertiser base did see an increase after the reversal, albeit one featuring mainly smaller Madison-area businesses as opposed to advertisers with a national base and/or deeper pockets (which are usually more desirable to radio managers and salespeople). On-air encouragement from "The Mic" to patronize their sponsors would increase noticeably in the months after Clear Channel's reversal.

In January 2009, "The Mic" made a schedule change that was greeted with more controversy, replacing Thom Hartmann's afternoon program with The Dave Ramsey Show, a program that is more known for financial advice and at times displays a conservative viewpoint. Though station management said the move was intended to broaden the station's listenership and not to make a wholesale change in political ideology, complaints from listeners and a few advertisers prompted WXXM to return Hartmann's show to the 2-5PM slot, while moving Ramsey's show to the 5-8AM slot in place of Lee Rayburn (Rayburn left the station by his own choosing earlier in the month, in part due to the direction he felt the station was taking by adding Ramsey's show). The Dave Ramsey Show would have a short stay on "The Mic," with the syndicated Bill Press Show replacing it one month after its debut on WXXM (Ramsey would later move to WIBA's late night schedule).

"The Mic's" weekday schedule would remain all-national until August 2011, when Outloud with Mary Carol was added to the 5-6PM hour. Carol was a behind-the-scenes staffer at Clear Channel Madison and co-hosted, with Our Lives Magazine publisher Patrick Farbaugh, the LGBT-oriented weekend show Being Authentic. By December 2011, Outloud would make way for a 2nd daily local show, The People's Mic, which was hosted by Workers Independent News personality Doug Cunningham and featured news and analysis on news and issues with a progressive, labor-friendly lean. The People's Mic was an independently owned, syndicated show, with the program's owners buying time on WXXM's early evening schedule to air the show, which also aired in the Wausau area through a similar arrangement with WXCO.

In 2012, another local show would be added to "The Mic's" schedule in the form of The Devil's Advocates Radio, hosted by Mike Crute and Dominic Salvia in an extension of their same-named weekly podcast. Devil's Advocates would feature listener interaction, interviews, and spirited-yet-friendly discussions on local and national topics through the lenses of the hosts' differing viewpoints (Crute's views mainly took a liberal lean, Salvia libertarian). Like People's Mic before it, Devil's Advocates was a time-buy program on WXXM, with Crute and Salvia purchasing air time and arranging sponsors for the show. Devil's Advocates debuted on "The Mic's" weekend schedule in early 2012 before moving to a one-hour weekday slot later that year; it eventually moved a 2-hour block and took a 3-hour late afternoon slot by 2015.

In March 2015, a major shift in WXXM's schedule saw the addition of the Madison-based Mitch Henck Show in the 8AM-11AM weekday slot. Mitch Henck had spent 12 years as mid-morning host on WXXM's sister station, the conservative-leaning news/talk outlet WIBA (AM); after his show was dropped from WIBA in 2014, Henck would become a columnist for the Wisconsin State Journal and its Madison.com website. Henck's addition and the resulting shifts of Stephanie Miller's and Thom Hartman's nationally syndicated programs to tape-delayed slots (middays and evenings, respectively), would generate form trepidation from "Mic" listeners who were loyal to the displaced shows and feared Henck's viewpoints would run counter to the station's progressive format. iHeartMedia Madison management countered, however, that Henck's opinions aren't as conservative as "Mic" fans would fear; that his show's morning slot is part of Henck's hopes to syndicate his show statewide; and that his addition to "The Mic" was part of iHeartMedia Madison's hope to cultivate more local content for the station, whose schedule over the prior 12 months had been in flux thanks in part to the end of Ed Schultz's and Randi Rhodes' nationally syndicated shows.

In a somewhat ironic move considering its aborted move to all-sports, WXXM would serve as a "second shadow station" for sports programming that conflicted with the schedules on WTSO and WIBA (AM), mainly broadcasts of Wisconsin Badgers athletics, Milwaukee Bucks basketball, and NASCAR racing. "The Mic" would serve as regular radio home for Wisconsin Badgers women's sports (volleyball and basketball), and would also carry some Sunday afternoon National Football League broadcasts from Westwood One, as well as games from the semi-pro Madison Mustangs in the early 2010s.

=== Classic hits (2016–present) ===
On November 9, 2016, at 11 a.m., WXXM began stunting with Christmas music under the "Best FM" branding. Though timed to occur one day after an election for U.S. President, iHeart Madison's plan to close "The Mic's" 12-year run as a progressive talk station was likely unrelated to the election or its eventual outcome. Indeed, seeds for the move were planted at least on or before the final week of October, when station management advised Devil's Advocates hosts Mike Crute and Dominic Salvia that they were dropping their show from the lineup. (Crute would correctly surmise to Isthmus that Devil's cancellation by WXXM was the harbinger of a format flip.) Mitch Henck would continue his daily show through his website, while Devil's Advocates would also continue in 2017 through a previously announced national syndication deal. Crute and Salvia would eventually acquire Waukesha-licensed WRRD to continue offering their program, and a progressive talk format, over-the-air to radio listeners in southern Wisconsin. (WRRD's signal strength is concentrated to Waukesha and Southeast Wisconsin, and offers only a fringe signal to the immediate Madison area.)

On November 23, 2016, at 6 a.m., two weeks after "The Mic's" end and one day before Thanksgiving, WXXM ended the Christmas music stunt and the "Best FM" placeholder branding, launching a new classic hits format branded as "Rewind 92.1." "Rewind's" playlist relies on core artists such as The Eagles, Elton John, Michael Jackson, Fleetwood Mac, and other acts from the late 60s thru the 90s. "Rewind's" launch, and WXXM's transition from Christmas music, came as the station it would compete against for the classic hits audience in Madison, Entercom's WOLX-FM, was segueing into its annual seasonal switch to Christmas music. "Rewind's" on-air programming in its first 2 years included "The Morning Rewind" with host Eric Paulsen (being simulcasted from fellow iHeart classic hits station WRIT-FM/Milwaukee), midday host and WIBA-FM weekend staffer Mike Foster, and weekday afternoon host Ben. Evenings featured a show called the "Rewind 92.1 Takeover", where listeners chose songs online via the station website. Weekends included the syndicated programs Absolutely 80s with Nina Blackwood and Time Warp with Bill St. James.

On November 21, 2019, almost exactly 3 years after the initial launch, WXXM shifted to an adult hits format, still branded as "Rewind", and keeping a majority of the playlist, but taking a jockless approach and changing their slogan to "We Play Anything", a slogan common among adult hits stations. Unlike many Variety Hits stations that air an automated playlist 24/7, the station still airs a selection of syndicated shows on weekends. Absolutely 80s and Time Warp remain, and four airings of classic American Top 40 shows with Casey Kasem air each weekend.

== HD Radio ==
For several years, WXXM carried "Pride Radio", iHeart Media's LGBT-oriented dance music format, on its HD2 subchannel (92.1-HD2). Pride Radio was dropped from WXXM-HD2 by the fall of 2015. Since then, WXXM-HD2 has featured, as has been iHeartMedia's practice with many of its terrestrial stations' HD subchannels in recent years, simulcasts of various iHeartRadio channels. The various iHeartRadio simulcasts on WXXM-HD2 have included the all-80s music channel "iHeart80s Radio"; a tribute channel dedicated to the music of Prince; and guest channels hosted by the likes of Foo Fighters (alternative rock), Jake Owen (contemporary country), and as of December 2018, Jim Brickman (Christmas music). In March 2019 WXXM HD2 was running IHearts80s radio.

In late November 2018, WXXM would add a third HD subchannel, carrying the "Breeze" format of soft adult contemporary music launched on several iHeart-owned HD stations across the country.

=== HD simulcast in Milwaukee ===
On December 15, 2011, WXXM received an additional outlet in the Milwaukee area, as Clear Channel imported WXXM's signal to air over the HD3 subchannel of urban-formatted WKKV-FM (100.7), a station licensed to Racine. The WKKV simulcast required listeners to have HD Radio equipment, or barring that, Clear Channel's iHeartRadio smartphone application. It was the first time a station with a full progressive talk format had been heard in the Milwaukee area, though Racine's WRJN (1400 AM) did carry some syndicated progressive hosts and had attracted a Milwaukee audience. The simulcast later moved to WKKV HD-2. After progressive talk was dropped by WXXM in November 2016, WKKV-HD2 would carry a simulcast of sister sports station WOKY. Around November 2018, WKKV-HD2 airs the same soft AC "Breeze" format found on WXXM-HD3.

=== Current status ===
As of April 2022, the HD2 and HD3 channels have since been turned off.
