= WZEE =

Coordinates: 43.051°N 89.487°W

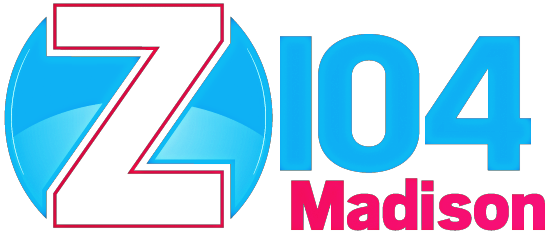
- Madison, Wisconsin; United States
- Broadcast area: South Central Wisconsin
- Frequency: 104.1 MHz (HD Radio)
- Branding: Z104

Programming
- Format: Top 40 (CHR)
- Subchannels: HD2: IHeartRadio's The Standard (adult standards/golden oldies); HD3: Air1 (contemporary worship music)
- Affiliations: Premiere Networks

Ownership
- Owner: iHeartMedia; (iHM Licenses, LLC)
- Sister stations: WIBA (AM); WIBA-FM; WMAD; WTSO; WXXM

History
- First air date: 1949
- Former call signs: WFOW (1949–1952); WMFM (1952–1974)
- Call sign meaning: American English phonetic sound of the letter Z

Technical information
- Licensing authority: FCC
- Facility ID: 41980
- Class: B
- ERP: 24,500 watts
- HAAT: 306 meters (1,004 ft)
- Translator: HD3: 103.3 W277AE (Madison)

Links
- Public license information: Public file; LMS
- Webcast: Listen live (via iHeartRadio); HD2: Listen live (via iHeartRadio); HD3: Listen live
- Website: z104fm.iheart.com; HD3: www.air1.com

WZEE (104.1 FM) is a radio station licensed to Madison, Wisconsin, and serving South Central Wisconsin. Known on-air as "Z104", the station is owned and operated by iHeartMedia and broadcasts an adult-leaning top 40 (CHR) music format.

== History ==
former logo

The station was first licensed on November 1, 1949, as WFOW, owned by Earl W. Fessler. The call sign was changed to WMFM on July 15, 1952. In 1974, the station converted from classical music to its current Top 40 (CHR) format, adopting the WZEE call sign and "Z104" on-air brand as well. During its early years, "Z104" ran an automated Top 40 format XT40 from Drake-Chenault programming, but live-and-local content would be added to the station over the years.

In June 1987, Z104 was one of several Top 40 stations in the United States to ban George Michael's top-charting song I Want Your Sex entirely by the station's music director Matt Hudson. Hudson replied to The Capital Times that the station's huge teenage audience made the recording too hot to handle, and he did not want to be responsible for putting out the message that is okay to say the title of the song, especially for the 12-year-olds who listened to Z104.

Z104 was original home to the popular morning drive-time pairing of "Connie and Fish" during the 2000s; the pair would move to Clear Channel's Milwaukee classic rock sister station WQBW in 2008, with the show remaining on WZEE in a simulcast. When WQBW became Top 40 station WRNW in 2010, "Connie & Fish" became "Connie & Curtis" after "Fish" Calloway left Clear Channel to work for the competitor WJQM. On September 4, 2012, "Connie & Curtis" (who had left for WLHT in West Michigan) would be replaced on both WZEE and WRNW by the nationally syndicated Elvis Duran and the Morning Show. "Z104" schedule features voicetracked or syndicated programming (including Elvis Duran and fellow Premiere Networks show On Air with Ryan Seacrest).

== HD Radio ==
WZEE broadcasts a HD radio signal, with its HD2 subchannel originally carrying an urban contemporary/hip-hop format to complement the main "Z104" format; that format was replaced in fall 2013 by a simulcast of "Classical Highlights", a classical music channel that is heard on iHeartMedia's iHeartRadio platform. By December 2022, Classical Highlights would be replaced with "The Standard", iHeartRadio's channel devoted to music and artists of the adult standards and golden oldies genres.

WZEE briefly aired a simulcast of sister sports station WTSO on its HD3 subchannel in 2012. The HD3 signal would be restarted by July 2021, carrying the contemporary worship music network Air1 and serving as the originating signal of low-power simulcast W277AE, which is owned by Air1 parent Educational Media Foundation.
