= WMGN =

Coordinates: 42.963°N 89.380°W

- Madison, Wisconsin; United States
- Broadcast area: Madison metropolitan area
- Frequency: 98.1 MHz
- Branding: Magic 98

Programming
- Format: Adult contemporary
- Affiliations: Premiere Networks

Ownership
- Owner: Mid-West Family Broadcasting; (Mid-West Management, Inc.)
- Sister stations: WHIT, WJJO, WJQM, WLMV, WOZN, WRIS-FM WWQM-FM

History
- First air date: September 1948
- Former call signs: WISC-FM (1948–1959); WISM-FM (1959–1983)
- Call sign meaning: Magic Ninety-Eight

Technical information
- Licensing authority: FCC
- Facility ID: 41900
- Class: B
- ERP: 36,000 watts
- HAAT: 176 meters (577 ft)

Links
- Public license information: Public file; LMS
- Webcast: Listen live
- Website: www.magic98.com

WMGN (98.1 FM) is a commercial radio station licensed to Madison, Wisconsin, United States, known as "Magic 98". It is owned by Mid-West Family Broadcasting and broadcasts an adult contemporary radio format. WMGN's transmitter is sited off County Highway MM, near U.S. Route 14 in Fitchburg. The studios and offices are on Rayovac Drive in Madison.

== History ==
The station signed on the air in September 1948 as WISC-FM. It was mostly simulcast with sister station WISC 1480 AM (now WLMV). WISC-AM-FM were owned by Radio Wisconsin, Inc., with offices in the Commercial State Bank Building. WISC-FM was the second commercial FM station in Madison, going on the air a year after 101.5 WIBA-FM.

WISC-AM-FM slightly changed their call signs to WISM-AM-FM in 1959. They were network affiliates of the Mutual Broadcasting System. By the late 1960s, WISM-FM had a separate easy listening format, that was largely automated.

By the 1980s, the easy listening format was attracting mostly older listeners. To gain a younger audience, WISM-FM flipped to soft rock as "Movin' Easy 98 FM". On December 1, 1983, the station changed its call letters to WMGN with the moniker "Magic 98". The format switched to soft adult contemporary music. Over time, the tempo picked up and WMGN became a Mainstream AC station.

== Christmas Music ==
WMGN is one of the few AC stations in the U.S. that does not switch to all-Christmas music for most of November and December. The all-holiday music format in Madison is heard on iHeartMedia’s 92.1 WXXM, Audacy’s 105.1 WMHX and non-commercial Christian Contemporary station 102.5 WNWC-FM, owned by the University of Northwestern – St. Paul. WMGN only switches to all-Christmas music a few days before December 25, calling it "The 98 Hours of Christmas", tying in its dial position.
