= Whitt (disambiguation) =

Whitt is a surname.

Whitt may also refer to:

- Kyle Whittingham (born 1959), American football coach
- Whittington W. Clement (born 1947), American politician whose nickname is "Whitt"
- Whitt L. Moreland (1930–1951), a U.S. Marine posthumous recipient of the Medal of Honor for his sacrifice during the Korean War
- Whitt, Texas
- Whitt elementary

== See also ==
- Whit (disambiguation)
