= WJJO =

- Watertown, Wisconsin; United States
- Broadcast area: Madison metropolitan area
- Frequency: 94.1 MHz
- Branding: 94.1 JJO

Programming
- Format: Active rock

Ownership
- Owner: Mid-West Family Broadcasting
- Sister stations: WHIT, WJQM, WLMV, WMGN, WOZN, WRIS-FM, WWQM-FM

History
- First air date: August 1, 1961
- Former call signs: WTTN-FM (1961–1982); WMLW (1982–1989); WTFX (1989–1991)
- Former frequencies: 104.7 MHz (1961–1972)

Technical information
- Licensing authority: FCC
- Facility ID: 73142
- Class: B
- ERP: 50,000 watts
- HAAT: 150 meters (490 ft)

Links
- Public license information: Public file; LMS
- Webcast: Listen live
- Website: wjjo.com

WJJO (94.1 FM, "94-1 JJO") is a commercial radio station licensed to Watertown, Wisconsin, United States, and serving the Madison metropolitan area. Owned by Mid-West Family Broadcasting, it has an active rock format, with studios located on Rayovac Drive in Madison and the transmitter sited on Wedvick Road in Deerfield.

== History ==
The station signed on the air on August 1, 1961, as WTTN-FM (104.7). It moved to 94.1 in the early 1970s to allow WTKM-FM in Hartford, Wisconsin, to apply for a construction permit to broadcast on 104.9. WTTN-FM and its AM sister station, WTTN at 1580 kHz (now silent), simulcast their programming until 1982.

In 1982, the FM started broadcasting in FM stereo and became WMLW ("Mellow 94"). It aired a soft adult contemporary format. WMLW also carried Milwaukee Brewers baseball games and aired syndicated programming such as The Rockin' America Top 30 Countdown with Scott Shannon and Westwood One's That's Love in the 1980s.

In 1989, with a change in ownership to Joyner Communications, the station flipped to Top 40 hits as 94.1 WTFX "The Fox". The studios moved to Madison and its transmitter location relocated to Deerfield, where it remains today. Joyner Communications later sold the station to the current owner, Mid-West Family Broadcasting.

On June 17, 1991, the call letters were changed to WJJO. A classic rock format was adopted.

On April 1, 1997, WJJO switched to its current format of Active Rock. It competes with iHeartMedia's classic rock station WIBA-FM 101.5 in the Madison radio market.

Its morning show was hosted by Johnny Danger and Greg Bair for many years. On December 22, 2006, Bair left to host mornings on Mid-West's WHLK "106.5 The Lake" in Cleveland. On Monday, November 3, 2008, Bair returned to WJJO to co-host the morning show for another eleven years. On August 30, 2019, Bair's last show with Johnny Danger aired. The morning show is currently hosted by Johnny Danger and Dee. Previous morning show hosts include Sue Peterson, Mark Elliot, and "Crash and Burns".

=== Awards ===
WJJO was the recipient of the "Radio Contraband Rock Radio Award for Medium Market Radio Station of the Year" in 2011, 2012, 2013 and 2014. In June 2013, Michele Clark's Sunset Sessions convention awarded WJJO the "rock station that plays the most new music".

WJJO was inducted to the Rock and Roll Hall of Fame in 2014.
