= WMAD =

- Cross Plains, Wisconsin; United States
- Broadcast area: Madison metropolitan area
- Frequency: 96.3 MHz (HD Radio)
- Branding: 96–3 Star Country

Programming
- Format: Country music
- Subchannels: HD2: Acoustic rock "Coffee Shop Radio"
- Affiliations: Premiere Networks

Ownership
- Owner: iHeartMedia, Inc.; (iHM Licenses, LLC)
- Sister stations: WIBA (AM), WIBA-FM, WTSO, WXXM, WZEE

History
- Former call signs: WVLR; WSEY (1987); WMLI (1987–1994 and 1996–2002); WMXF (1994–1996); WCJZ (2002–2003)
- Call sign meaning: Station serves MADison

Technical information
- Licensing authority: FCC
- Facility ID: 50055
- Class: B1
- ERP: 5,100 watts
- HAAT: 213 meters (699 ft)
- Transmitter coordinates: 43.212°N 89.600°W

Links
- Public license information: Public file; LMS
- Webcast: Listen Live; Listen Live (HD2)
- Website: 963starcountry.iheart.com

WMAD (96.3 FM "96-3 Star Country") is a commercial radio station licensed to Cross Plains, Wisconsin, and serving the Madison metropolitan area. It broadcasts a country music radio format and is owned by iHeartMedia, Inc. WMAD carries two nationally syndicated radio shows from co-owned Premiere Networks: The Bobby Bones Show on weekday mornings and After MidNite with Granger Smith heard overnight. The radio studios and offices are on South Fish Hatchery Road in Madison.

WMAD has an effective radiated power (ERP) of 5,100 watts. The transmitter is on Simpson Road at U.S. Route 12 in Dane, Wisconsin. In addition to the analog signal, WMAD also broadcasts an HD Radio signal. The HD-2 digital subchannel carries an acoustic rock format, known as "Coffee Shop Radio."

== History ==
=== WMAD call sign history ===
The call letters WMAD originally were on AM 1550 and later simulcast on 106.3 WMAD-FM Middleton (now WWQM-FM). That version of WMAD started as a country format and remained country until 1977 when the call letters on 1550 were dropped (WWQM "15Q" oldies replaced country).

WMAD-FM continued until early 1978 when the call sign was dropped from 106.3. The WMAD call letters resurfaced in 1979 on the station at 92.1 FM (licensed to Sun Prairie, Wisconsin and current home to WXXM).

=== Early years (197?–2002) ===
The 96.3 FM frequency in the Madison radio market has had a varied format history. In the 1970s the station was WVLR. In the mid-1990s the station played 1970s music as Mix96.3 WMXF. Following this format, the station returned to a soft rock format as WMLI, which eventually morphed into adult contemporary "Star 96.3."

=== Smooth jazz (2002–2003) ===
In March 2002, the station shifted to a smooth jazz format as "Smooth Jazz 96.3 WCJZ," filling a niche in the Madison market filled only by the "Magic Sunday Morning" smooth jazz program on WMGN (Magic 98).

=== Alternative (2003–2005) ===
WCJZ and its smooth jazz format failed to show ratings growth, which led management to make another change in format. At 12 Noon on December 31, 2003, WCJZ began a 6-hour stunt with a ticking clock and synthesized voice announcing station ID and jokes. At 6:00 PM that night, an announcement heralded the return of the alternative rock-formatted "MAD Radio".

Fourteen months earlier, iHeartMedia (then known as Clear Channel Communications) replaced alternative rock on 92.1 WMAD in favor of a Hot AC station, "Mix 92.1." Fans of that "MAD Radio" incarnation were left disappointed by the change. Acknowledging the outcry, management resurrected "MAD Radio" at the 96.3 frequency. With this change, the WMAD call letters were moved to 96.3, while 92.1 changed their call letters to WXXM.

Despite an early peak in interest from Madison radio listeners, the new "MAD Radio" did not build as strong a following as the old version had. An increase of older alternative hits in the playlist (highlighted by the "Sunday Morning Resurrection" program) and the addition of the syndicated Rover's Morning Glory failed to bump up the station's fortunes. With WMAD's Arbitron ratings near the bottom of the Madison market, Clear Channel would make yet another change on the frequency, ending "MAD Radio 96.3" on the night of December 22, 2005, after 2 hours of songs with a "goodbye" or "end" theme, ending with "Last Goodbye" by Jeff Buckley and the Jimi Hendrix version of "The Star-Spangled Banner." "MAD Radio" would resurface once again in 2007, airing a commercial-free alternative format on a HD Radio subchannel of sister station WIBA-FM.

=== Country (2005–present) ===
former logo, 2005–2015

At 12AM on December 23, 2005, WMAD launched a new contemporary country format under the branding, "96.3 Star Country," beginning with a montage of its liners and jingles followed by Gretchen Wilson's "All Jacked Up," the first of 10,000 songs played without interruption for commercials or DJs on "Star Country."

Originally using the tag line "Now you have a choice," Clear Channel took an aggressive approach in promoting "Star Country" and in targeting the long-time country station in Madison, WWQM-FM. The aggressiveness included luring away the WWQM-FM morning team of John Flint and Tammy Lee, who would helm "Star Country's" morning shift from November 2006 until June 2011, when they departed for San Diego's KSON. The following September, WMAD tapped Tracy Dixon and Mike Heller as their new morning team; Dixon came from Clear Channel-owned KMFX-FM in Rochester, Minnesota, Heller from sister sports station WTSO (where he continued as afternoon host). "Tracy & Mike" remained paired in mornings until they were replaced by the Premiere Networks-syndicated Bobby Bones Show in February 2013.

== HD Radio ==
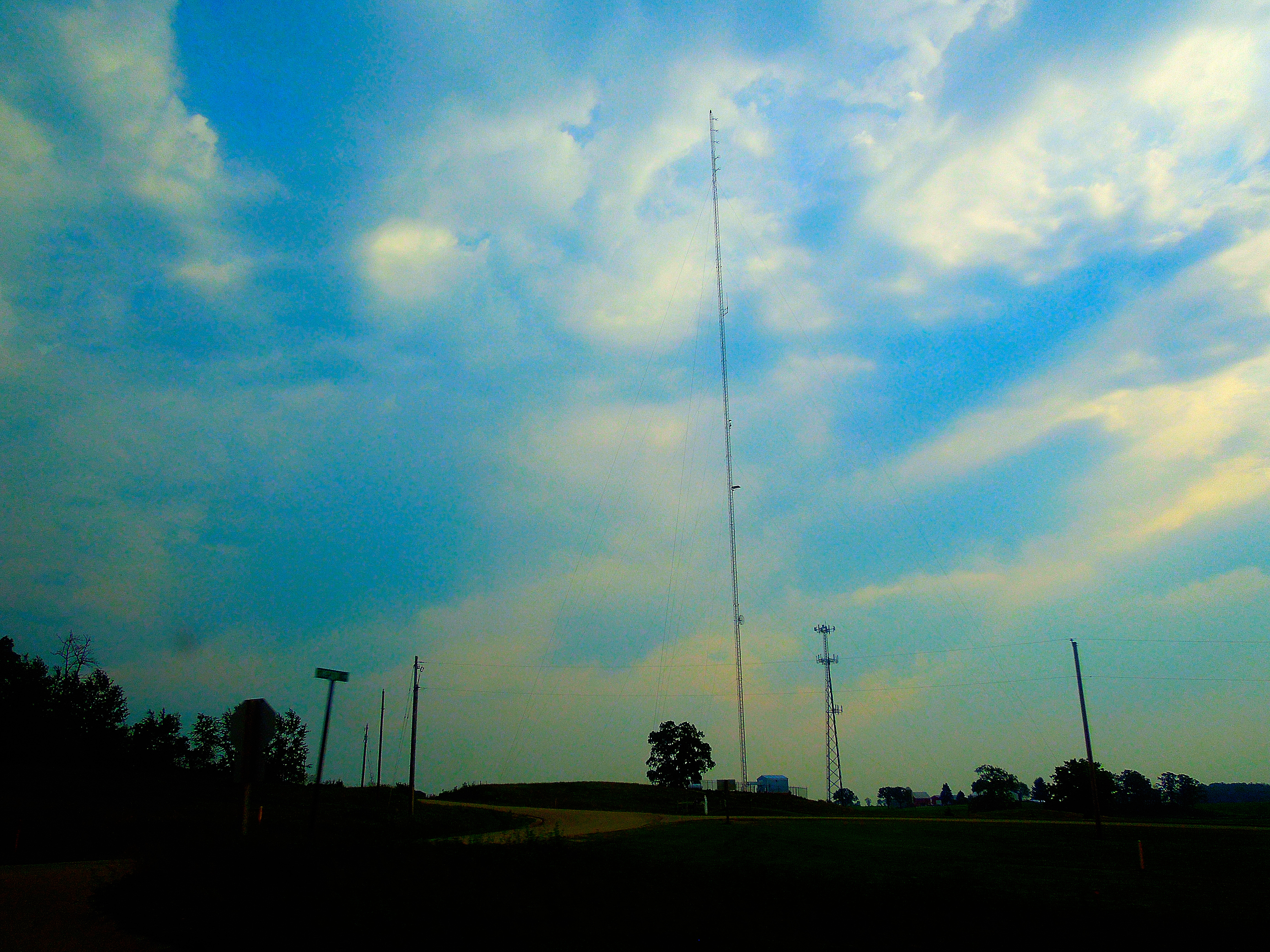
WMAD 96.3 Star Country Broadcast Tower

WMAD broadcasts a multiplexed HD Radio signal. The station's HD2 digital subchannel originally aired a classic country format ("Star Country Classics") to complement the contemporary country music heard on WMAD's main channel. "Star Country Classics" was dropped in Fall 2013 in favor of a rotating succession of streams from Clear Channel's IHeartRadio platform. The channels included "Global Citizen Radio" (variety hits) and "Nashville" (modern country).

As of November 2014, "Coffee Shop Radio" (acoustic rock) is heard on WMAD-HD2.
