= WCSY =

WCSY may refer to:

- WCSY-FM, a radio station (103.7 FM) licensed to South Haven, Michigan, United States
- WCSY (AM), a defunct radio station (940 AM) formerly licensed to serve South Haven
