= Whit =

Whit may refer to:

- Whit or Whitsun, another name for the holy day of Pentecost
- Whit (given name)
- Whit (novel), by Iain Banks
- WHIT, a radio station licensed to Madison, Wisconsin, United States, having the call sign WHIT since 2009
- WCSY (AM), a radio station licensed to South Haven, Michigan, United States, which held the call sign WHIT from 2005 to 2009
- WHKF, a radio station licensed to Harrisburg, Pennsylvania, United States, which held the call sign WHIT from 1987 to 1988

== See also ==
- Whit's Diner, a historic diner in Framingham, Massachusetts
- Whit Rock, off the coast of Graham Land, Antarctica
- Whitt (disambiguation)
