= WPTT =

WPTT may refer to:

- WPTT (AM), a radio station (1540 AM) licensed to Hartford, Wisconsin, United States
- WGBN, a radio station (1150 AM) licensed to McKeesport, Pennsylvania, United States, which held the call sign WPTT from 1998 to 2008
- WPNT, a television station (channel 21/PSIP 22) licensed to Pittsburgh, Pennsylvania, United States, which held the call sign WPTT-TV from 1978 to 1998
