= KQRA =

Coordinates: 36.974°N 93.427°W

- Ozark, Missouri; United States
- Broadcast area: Springfield, Missouri
- Frequency: 92.9 MHz
- Branding: Q92.9

Programming
- Format: Active rock
- Affiliations: United Stations Radio Networks

Ownership
- Owner: Mid-West Family Broadcasting
- Sister stations: KKLH, KOMG, KOSP

History
- First air date: 1995 (as KOMG)
- Former call signs: KOMG (1995–2010); KOSP (2010–2026)

Technical information
- Licensing authority: FCC
- Facility ID: 51100
- Class: C2
- ERP: 50,000 watts
- HAAT: 150 meters

Links
- Public license information: Public file; LMS
- Webcast: Listen live
- Website: www.q929rocks.com

KQRA (92.9 FM, "Q92-9") is a radio station broadcasting an active rock format. Licensed to Ozark, Missouri, United States, it serves the Springfield area. The station is currently owned by Mid-West Family Broadcasting.

== Station History ==
The 92.9 frequency was originally the home of KOMG, which signed on with a Classic Country format in 1995. It was later known as Magic 92.9 as hot AC and then Mix 92.9. On September 13, 2010, KOMG swapped signals with sister station KOSP, which had an Adult Contemporary format billed as "Star 105.1." After the swap, KOSP was relaunched as "Star 92.9" but would later evolve to Classic Hits by 2011. On August 29, 2012, at 10AM, KOSP dropped their Classic Hits format for Rhythmic CHR as “92.9 The Beat." This puts KOSP in direct competition with KSPW, who started out as a Rhythmic when it flipped formats from AC in 2001.

On October 20, 2014, KOSP began a new Morning Show called "Rich and McClain in the Morning." The slogan of the show is "Try something new," as they broadcast live from 6-10 am Monday through Friday. The show brings market vet and former morning host Dawn McClain who spent 12 years at KSPW with Richard Deaver Jr, who comes to KOSP from WPLJ in NYC where he was a member of the Todd Show in the Morning. He was the youngest full-time morning on-air personality in the New York City radio market. Deaver would leave the station a short time later, leaving McClain solo in mornings. In the time Rich and McClain was on the air they took the station from #9 to #1 in one book beating out Power, their main competition for the first time ever.

On March 12, 2018, KOSP introduced “2 Chicks and a Mic”. The show is being promoted as the first all-female morning show in the Springfield market, hosted by Amber Nix and Lauren, the latter a holdover from the “Chris & Company” program.

On October 8, 2025, the active rock format of sister station KQRA (102.1 FM) moved to 92.9 FM. On October 14, 102.1 FM flipped to a sports gambling format. With the change, KOSP and KQRA swapped call signs effective February 12, 2026.
