= WDKB =

Coordinates: 41.949°N 88.896°W

- DeKalb, Illinois; United States
- Broadcast area: North Central Illinois
- Frequency: 94.9 MHz
- Branding: 94.9 WDKB

Programming
- Format: Hot adult contemporary

Ownership
- Owner: Mid-West Family Broadcasting; (Long Nine, Inc.)

History
- First air date: August 13, 1990
- Call sign meaning: W DeKalB

Technical information
- Licensing authority: FCC
- Facility ID: 16408
- Class: A
- ERP: 3,000 watts
- HAAT: 100 meters (330 ft)

Links
- Public license information: Public file; LMS
- Webcast: Listen Live
- Website: 949wdkb.com

WDKB (94.9 FM) is a radio station that broadcasts a hot adult contemporary format. Licensed to DeKalb, Illinois, the station is owned by Mid-West Family Broadcasting, through licensee Long Nine, Inc.

== History ==
The station began broadcasting on August 13, 1990, airing an adult contemporary format with the branding "B95", and was owned by DeKalb County Radio, Limited.

Effective August 31, 2018, the station was sold by DeKalb County Radio to Mid-West Family Broadcasting for $650,000.

On November 30, 2018, WDKB shifted its format to hot adult contemporary, branded as "94.9 WDKB".

As of August 2022, 94.9 WDKB is now the home for NIU sports.
