= KQYB =

- Spring Grove, Minnesota; United States
- Broadcast area: La Crosse, Wisconsin
- Frequency: 98.3 MHz
- Branding: KQ98

Programming
- Format: Country

Ownership
- Owner: Mid-West Family Broadcasting; (Family Radio, Inc.)
- Sister stations: WIZM-FM, WRQT, WIZM (AM), KCLH, WKTY

History
- First air date: 1980

Technical information
- Licensing authority: FCC
- Facility ID: 63804
- Class: C2
- ERP: 33,000 watts
- HAAT: 185 meters (607 ft)
- Transmitter coordinates: 43°40′53.00″N 91°45′28.00″W
- Translators: 103.9 K280EI (Winona); 107.7 W299AC (La Crosse)

Links
- Public license information: Public file; LMS
- Webcast: Listen Live
- Website: kq98.com

KQYB (98.3 FM, “KQ98”) is a radio station broadcasting a country music format. Licensed to Spring Grove, Minnesota, United States, the station serves La Crosse. The station is currently owned by Mid-West Family Broadcasting.

== Translators ==
In addition to the main station, KQYB is relayed by an additional two broadcast translators to its coverage area.

Call sign	Frequency	City of license	FID	ERP (W)	Class	FCC info
K280EI	103.9 FM	Winona, Minnesota	63808	140	D	LMS
W299AC	107.7 FM	La Crosse, Wisconsin	63805	94	D	LMS
