= KOSP =

- Brookline, Missouri; United States
- Broadcast area: Springfield metropolitan area
- Frequency: 102.1 MHz
- Branding: 102.1 The Won

Programming
- Format: Sports gambling
- Affiliations: St. Louis Blues; St. Louis Cardinals; VSiN; Westwood One

Ownership
- Owner: Mid-West Family Broadcasting; (MW Springmo, Inc.)
- Sister stations: KKLH; KOMG; KQRA

History
- First air date: May 28, 2002
- Former call signs: KQRA (2002–2026)

Technical information
- Licensing authority: FCC
- Facility ID: 79138
- Class: A
- ERP: 4,900 watts
- HAAT: 110 meters (360 ft)

Links
- Public license information: Public file; LMS
- Website: www.1021thewon.com

KOSP (102.1 FM) is a commercial radio station located in Brookline, Missouri, broadcasting to the Springfield, Missouri, area. KOSP airs a sports gambling format branded as "102.1 The Won".

On October 8, 2025, the station's then-rock format moved to KOSP (92.9 FM), which has a larger signal to attract more listeners.

On October 14, 2025, KQRA changed their format to sports gambling, branded as "102.1 The Won". With the change, KQRA and KOSP swapped call signs. With the change, KOSP and KQRA swapped call signs effective February 12, 2026.
