= WWQM-FM =

Radio station in Middleton–Madison, Wisconsin

Coordinates: 43.051°N 89.487°W

Middleton, Wisconsin; United States
- Broadcast area: Madison, Wisconsin
- Frequency: 106.3 MHz
- Branding: Q106

Programming
- Format: Country
- Affiliations: Compass Media Networks

Ownership
- Owner: Mid-West Family Broadcasting
- Sister stations: WHIT, WJJO, WJQM, WLMV, WMGN, WOZN, WRIS-FM

History
- First air date: 1970 (as WWQM-FM)
- Former call signs: WMAD-FM (1972–1977); WMAD (1977–1978)
- Call sign meaning: Q-Madison

Technical information
- Licensing authority: FCC
- Facility ID: 19623
- Class: A
- ERP: 4,500 watts
- HAAT: 114 meters

Links
- Public license information: Public file; LMS
- Webcast: Listen Live
- Website: q106.com

WWQM-FM (106.3 MHz) is a radio station licensed to Middleton, Wisconsin and serving the Madison area. Owned and operated by Mid-West Family Broadcasting, the station has aired a country music format since 1981.

== History ==
Former "Q106" logo

WWQM signed on in 1970 as WMAD-FM, owned by Hudson Broadcasting. As WMAD-FM, it simulcast with country-formatted WMAD (at 1550 AM, the current WHIT). "The Country Giant" was an early station slogan, followed by "Music of America." WMAD-AM became WWQM ("15Q") in 1976, running an automated oldies format featured PAMS jingles, while WMAD-FM adopted its own country format, though competitor WTSO continually beat it in the ratings, forcing WMAD-FM to drop Country for Top 40 rock in 1978. WMAD adopted the WWQM call letters in 1978, running a live-assist format using TM Programming Stereo Rock. In mid-1978, the station hadn't reached the high ratings expected and Q106 became a fully automated station. In January 1980, Q106 dropped automation and went live Top 40. This version of Q106 only lasted a short time and a switch to country would follow in 1981.

On November 3, 2008, Q106's reach would expand outside of the immediate Madison area with a simulcast on WWQN at 106.7 FM, a signal that covers Iowa County and far Western portions of Dane County. The 106.7 frequency was previously home to Rhythmic Top 40 station WJQM, which moved to 93.1 FM (and displaced the classic rock-formatted WHLK) to accommodate the Q106 simulcast. WWQN simulcast the programming of WWQM until December 13, 2011, when it moved to a simulcast of talk station WTDY (as WTDY-FM).

Previous "Q106" logo

The Q106 format was adjusted in July 2009 when new program director John Sebastian instituted a new "Q106.3" (or simply "The Q"). The adjusted format featured less talk by DJ's and more music. The playlist was also broadened to include vintage country songs and pop and rock songs with crossover appeal. After Sebastian departed the station in Summer 2011, new program director Fletcher Keyes gradually reversed the format back to contemporary mainstream country.

The station deactivated all of their social media presences on February 18, 2021, shortly after Matthew Bradshaw Jones, who was the station's morning co-host as "Jackson Jones", was arrested for allegations of possessing child pornography.

== Madison Country Music Awards ==
For more than 20 years (through Fall 2008), WWQM hosted the "Madison Country Music Awards," an annual awards ceremony honoring local and national country artists. The ceremonies, which were popular among the station's Madison audience, featured performances by local and national country acts (including a then-up-and-coming Taylor Swift in 2007) as well as presentations of awards as voted by Q106 listeners (e.g. awards for Entertainer of the Year and Best Local Band). The Madison Country Music Awards were discontinued in 2009 at the time of Q106's format adjustment.

== See also ==
- Mid-West Family Broadcasting
