= WRQT =

- La Crosse, Wisconsin; United States
- Broadcast area: La Crosse Metropolitan Area; Caledonia, Minnesota
- Frequency: 95.7 MHz
- Branding: 95.7 The Rock

Programming
- Format: Active Rock
- Affiliations: United Stations Radio Networks

Ownership
- Owner: Mid-West Family Broadcasting; (Family Radio, Inc.)
- Sister stations: WIZM-FM, WKTY, WIZM (AM), KCLH, KQYB

History
- First air date: August 7, 1972 (first license granted)
- Former call signs: WSPL-FM (1979-?); WSPL (?-1996); WTRV (1996–1998)

Technical information
- Licensing authority: FCC
- Facility ID: 36208
- Class: C2
- ERP: 50,000 watts
- HAAT: 150 m (492 ft)

Links
- Public license information: Public file; LMS
- Webcast: Listen Live
- Website: 957therock.com

WRQT (95.7 FM, 95.7 The Rock) is a radio station broadcasting an active rock format. Licensed to La Crosse, Wisconsin, United States, the station serves the La Crosse area. The station is currently owned by Mid-West Family Broadcasting. The station no longer broadcasts in HD Radio.

== History ==
The station went on the air as WSPL-FM on July 30, 1979. On January 29, 1980, the station changed its call sign to WSPL, on March 6, 1996 it changed to WTRV, while on April 1, 1998, it changed to the current 95.7 The Rock WRQT.
