= Whitt =

Whitt is a surname. It may refer to:

- Brandon Whitt (born 1982), American racing driver
- Cole Whitt (born 1991), American racing driver
- Don Whitt (1930–2013), American golfer
- Ernie Whitt (born 1952), American baseball player
- Jack Whitt (born 1990), American pole vaulter
- Jimmy Whitt (born 1997), American basketball player
- Joe Whitt Jr. (born 1978), American football coach
- Rusty Whitt (born 1971), American strength and conditioning coach
- Ward Whitt (born 1942), American professor
- W. B. Whitt (1867–1926), American businessman and politician

== See also ==
- Whit (disambiguation)
