= WKTY =

Radio station in La Crosse, Wisconsin

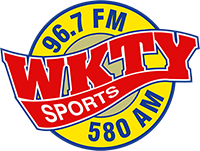
- La Crosse, Wisconsin; United States
- Broadcast area: La Crosse, Wisconsin
- Frequency: 580 kHz
- Branding: WKTY 96.7FM 580AM

Programming
- Format: Sports
- Affiliations: Westwood One; Infinity Sports Network; Green Bay Packers; Milwaukee Brewers; Milwaukee Bucks

Ownership
- Owner: Mid-West Family Broadcasting; (Family Radio, Inc.)
- Sister stations: WIZM-FM, WRQT, KQYB, KCLH, WIZM (AM)

History
- First air date: May 27, 1948

Technical information
- Licensing authority: FCC
- Facility ID: 36207
- Class: B
- Power: 5,000 watts day 740 watts night
- Transmitter coordinates: 43°44′25.00″N 91°12′21.00″W
- Translator: 96.7 K244FM (La Crosse)

Links
- Public license information: Public file; LMS
- Webcast: Listen Live
- Website: wktysports.com

WKTY (580 AM) is a radio station broadcasting a sports format. Licensed to La Crosse, Wisconsin, United States, the station serves the La Crosse area. The station is owned by Mid-West Family Broadcasting and features programming from Westwood One and Infinity Sports Network.

== Play-by-Play Sports ==
The station serves as the La Crosse affiliate for the Green Bay Packers of the National Football League, Milwaukee Brewers of Major League Baseball, and Milwaukee Bucks of the National Basketball Association. WKTY also carries local college and high school athletics.

== Programming ==
WKTY broadcast a mixture of local, regional, and national sports programming. Its national shows include The Dan Patrick Show, The Jim Rome Show, and select programming from CBS Sports Radio and Westwood One. The station also carries The Bill Michaels Show, a regional sports talk show; local programming in the morning, The WiscoSports Show in the evenings with Grant Blise; and local play-by-play sports.

== History ==
WKTY began broadcasting May 27, 1948, on 580 kHz with 1 KW power (full-time). It was owned by the La Crosse Broadcasting Company and was a Mutual affiliate. During the 1980s, the station was full service, switching back and forth between playing country music and adult contemporary.
