= KKLH =

Coordinates: 37.206°N 92.906°W

- Marshfield, Missouri; United States
- Broadcast area: Springfield, Missouri
- Frequency: 104.7 MHz
- Branding: 104.7 The Cave

Programming
- Format: Classic rock

Ownership
- Owner: Mid-West Family Broadcasting; (MW Springmo, Inc.)
- Sister stations: KOMG; KOSP; KQRA

History
- First air date: June 26, 1979 (as KEMM-FM)
- Former call signs: KEMM-FM (1979–1980); KOSC-FM (1979–1984); KTOZ (1984–1986); KTOZ-FM (1986–1996); KZBE (7/1996–8/1996)

Technical information
- Licensing authority: FCC
- Facility ID: 24424
- Class: C2
- ERP: 34,000 watts
- HAAT: 181 meters (594 ft)

Links
- Public license information: Public file; LMS
- Webcast: Listen live
- Website: www.1047thecave.com

KKLH (104.7 FM) is a radio station broadcasting a classic rock format. Licensed to Marshfield, Missouri, United States, it serves the Springfield area. The station is owned by Mid-West Family Broadcasting.

KKLH is the home for the Kansas City Chiefs football games and programming for the Springfield market.

== History ==
When KEMM-FM signed on the air in 1979 with a MOR music format, the station originally operated with 3,000 watts. It was the FM sister station to KEMM (1510 AM) in Marshfield, Missouri. The call sign was changed to KOSC-FM on October 27, 1980. The station would later air an adult contemporary music format under the branding "Z105" with the call letters KTOZ-FM. This lasted until 1990 when the station dropped its AC format for a short-lived country format before flipping to a mainstream rock format in 1993. After a short stunt as KZBE from July to August 1996, the station flipped its format to classic rock and changed its call sign to KKLH. In 1999, the station's wattage was upgraded to 34,000 watts.
