= Stuart D. Levitan =

American journalist

Stuart D. Levitan (born November 29, 1953) is an American journalist, lawyer, politician, historian, and author.

== Early life ==
Levitan grew up in Long Island, New York, the son of David M. Levitan and Judith Morley Levitan. Levitan graduated from New College of Florida

== Career ==
Levitan was hired by the Capital Times as a part-time Washington correspondent in 1975, after a visit to Madison while following presidential candidate Fred Harris. In 1976, Levitan joined the Capital Times fulltime in Madison. In 1977, Levitan left the Capital Times due to the strike by the Printer's Union (which would last for 5 years) and joined the Madison Press Connection, a paper formed by striking workers. Levitan later left the paper and enrolled in law school, afterwards joining the Wisconsin Employment Relations Commission as a staff attorney, where he served until retiring in early 2015.

== Civic Involvement ==
Levitan was elected to the Dane County Board of Supervisors in 1982 from the Fourth District, serving five years. He was a member of the Democratic Socialists of America.

Beginning in 1983, Levitan served on a number of boards, committees, and commissions in local government, including the Civic Center Commission, the Madison Zoning Board of Appeals, the State Street Oversight Committee, the Madison Plan Commission, and the Community Development Authority.

Levtian was appointed to the Madison Landmarks Commission in 2007, and served until 2019, much of it as Chair of the commission. While Levitan served on the commission, major issues that came before the commission included the Edgewater Hotel Redevelopment and the removal of the cenotaph at the Confederate Rest section of Forest Hill Cemetery.

Levitan ran for Secretary of State in 1990, and for State Senate against incumbent Fred Risser in 1996.

Levitan hosted ”Books And Beats” on The Mic 92.1 which was described as a show of "‘long form’ interviews with performers and especially authors.". Since 2006, he has hosted “Access: City Hall”, a television show on the Madison City Channel that interviews local officials and newsmakers in Madison. Levitan is the Vice President of the Board of Directors of WORT-FM, a community radio station in Madison.

Levitan Lane, on Madison's far east side, is named for him.

== Books ==
Levitan is the author of Madison: The Illustrated Sesquicentennial History, Volume 1: 1856-1931 (University of Wisconsin Press, 2006, ISBN 9780299216740, OCLC 70775651

Levitan is also the author of Madison in the Sixties (Wisconsin Historical Society Press, 2018) ISBN 9780870208836, OCLC 1035821343. In developing the book, Levitan read every published issue of the Wisconsin State Journal, the Capital Times, and The Daily Cardinal during the 1960s.
