= KCLH =

- Caledonia, Minnesota; United States
- Broadcast area: La Crosse, Wisconsin
- Frequency: 94.7 MHz
- Branding: Classic Hits 94.7

Programming
- Format: Classic hits
- Affiliations: United Stations Radio Networks; Premiere Networks

Ownership
- Owner: Mid-West Family Broadcasting; (Family Radio, Inc.)
- Sister stations: WIZM-FM, WRQT, KQYB, WIZM (AM), WKTY

History
- First air date: August 31, 1994 (as KSOF)
- Former call signs: KSOF (1994–1997); KHTW (1997–1998); KSFF (1998–2001)
- Call sign meaning: K CLassic Hits

Technical information
- Licensing authority: FCC
- Facility ID: 63807
- Class: A
- ERP: 2,100 watts
- HAAT: 171 meters (561 ft)
- Transmitter coordinates: 43°41′24″N 91°30′9″W

Links
- Public license information: Public file; LMS
- Webcast: Listen Live
- Website: classichits947.com

KCLH (94.7 FM) is a radio station broadcasting a classic hits format. Licensed to Caledonia, Minnesota, United States, the station serves the greater La Crosse area. The station is currently owned by Mid-West Family Broadcasting The station no longer broadcasts in HD radio.

== History ==
The station went on the air as KSOF on August 31, 1994. The station changed its call sign to KHTW on April 11, 1997; to KSFF on October 26, 1998; and to the current KCLH on October 10, 2001.
