= KOMG =

- Willard, Missouri; United States
- Broadcast area: Springfield, Missouri
- Frequency: 105.1 MHz
- Branding: 105.1 The Bull

Programming
- Format: Country

Ownership
- Owner: Mid-West Family Broadcasting
- Sister stations: KKLH, KOSP, KQRA

History
- First air date: 1992 (as KOSP)
- Former call signs: KZDC (1991–1992, CP); KOSP (1992–2010)

Technical information
- Licensing authority: FCC
- Facility ID: 35427
- Class: C2
- ERP: 50,000 watts
- HAAT: 150 meters
- Transmitter coordinates: 36°58′26″N 93°25′37″W

Links
- Public license information: Public file; LMS
- Webcast: Listen Live
- Website: thebull1051.com

KOMG (105.1 FM, "The Bull") is a radio station licensed to Willard, Missouri, United States. KOMG airs country music from the 1990s-2010s branded as "105.1 The Bull".

On-air staff (as of 2026)

- Around The Ozarks Mornings with Grace: 5:30 am – 10:00 am
- Blaski: 10:00 am – 2:00 pm
- Mason: 2:00pm – 6:00pm
