= WCSY (AM) =

South Haven, Michigan; United States
- Frequency: 940 kHz
- Branding: SuperSPORTS 940 COSY-AM

Programming
- Format: defunct
- Affiliations: Fox Sports Radio

Ownership
- Owner: Mid-West Family Broadcast Group

History
- Former call signs: WHIT (12/14/05-01/19/2009); WSPZ (4/12/05-12/14/05); WGMY (3/8/99-4/12/05); WCSY (1/11/99-3/8/99); WGMY (7/18/97-1/11/99); WCSY (10/24/81-7/18/97); WJOR (?-10/24/81)
- Call sign meaning: CoSY

Technical information
- Facility ID: 14011

Links
- Website: WCSY-AM

WCSY (940 AM) was a radio station that broadcast in South Haven, Michigan. It formerly simulcasted sister station WCSY-FM (103.7 FM).

== History ==
Until 2005, the station's format was Adult Standards fed via satellite from Westwood One; it later switched to an oldies format called "Oldies Plus", from Waitt Radio Networks.

The station had filed a construction permit to move its community of license to Hudsonville, Michigan. This move was never completed.

On January 19, 2009, the WCSY call sign was returned to 940 AM to match the WCSY-FM simulcast. The WHIT call sign was then returned to a Mid-West Broadcast Group station in Madison, Wisconsin formerly "WTUX".

In March 2011, the station's website reported that WCSY would be switching to a Sports Talk format on March 31, 2011 featuring Fox Sports Radio and Detroit Tigers baseball. The format change happened on April 8, 2011.

Mid-West Family Broadcasting took WCSY AM 940 South Haven off the air permanently, electing to cease operations as of 10:40 a.m. on Monday, January 2, 2012. The station's two tower array was taken down about a month later. The station license was cancelled by the Federal Communications Commission om January 11, 2012.

== Sources ==
- Michiguide.com
