= WTSO =

Coordinates: 42°59′45″N 89°18′59″W

- Madison, Wisconsin; United States
- Broadcast area: Madison metropolitan area
- Frequency: 1070 kHz
- Branding: 1070 The Game

Programming
- Format: Sports
- Affiliations: Fox Sports Radio

Ownership
- Owner: iHeartMedia, Inc.; (iHM Licenses, LLC)
- Sister stations: WIBA (AM); WIBA-FM; WMAD; WXXM; WZEE

History
- First air date: January 19, 1948
- Former call signs: WKOW (1948–1971)
- Call sign meaning: For station's frequency, read as "ten-seven-oh (zero)"

Technical information
- Licensing authority: FCC
- Facility ID: 41973
- Class: B
- Power: 10,000 watts (day); 5,000 watts (night)

Links
- Public license information: Public file; LMS
- Webcast: Listen live (via iHeartRadio)
- Website: 1070thegame.iheart.com

WTSO (1070 AM, "1070 The Game") is a commercial radio station in Madison, Wisconsin, known as "1070 The Game." The station is owned and operated by iHeartMedia, Inc., and airs a sports radio format. The offices and studios are on South Fish Hatchery Road in Fitchburg (but using Madison as its mailing address).

By day, WTSO is powered at 10,000 watts. Because 1070 AM is a clear-channel frequency reserved for Class A station KNX in Los Angeles, at night, to avoid interference, WTSO must reduce its power to 5,000 watts and use a directional antenna with a six-tower array. WTSO must also protect the former Class A station on 1070 AM in Moncton, New Brunswick, CBA, though it has since moved to FM as CBAM-FM. WTSO's transmitter is off East Tower Road in McFarland.

== History ==
The station signed on the air on January 19, 1948. The original call sign was WKOW. With Wisconsin known as "The Dairy State", the original call letters stood for the word "cow". The licensee was the Monona Broadcasting Company.

In 1971, the call sign was changed to WTSO to stand for "ten seven zero", its frequency. At that time, it was owned by Midcontinent Broadcasting and aired in a country music format. As country music listening switched to the FM dial, WTSO tried a talk radio format and later adult standards.

In 2000, WTSO switched to an all-sports format, initially as a network affiliate of ESPN Radio. It was called "Madison's ESPN Radio 10-7-0". On January 1, 2009, WTSO parted company with ESPN Radio and rebranded as "The Big 1070, Madison's Sports Station". It affiliated with Fox Sports Radio and later added some programming from NBC Sports Radio. ESPN Radio programming now airs on WTLX.

On February 3, 2020, WTSO rebranded as "1070 The Game". In March 2021, WTSO announced it would become the Chicago Cubs Radio Network's first Wisconsin affiliate, providing a locally based alternate to the Chicago-based WSCR, which also covers Southern Wisconsin with its signal.

From 2014 until February 1, 2020, WTSO programming was simulcast on FM translator W265CV at 100.9 MHz. W265CV now airs a 1960s-1970s oldies format as "U-100.9".

== Programming ==
Programming from Fox Sports Radio is heard on nights and weekends.

WTSO's live sports coverage includes broadcasts of Chicago Cubs baseball, NASCAR races from MRN Radio and PRN Radio, as well as local high school events, including championships in the Wisconsin Interscholastic Athletic Association. WTSO also airs live broadcasts of some University of Wisconsin Badgers games along with sister station WIBA (1310 AM).

== See also ==
- List of radio stations in Wisconsin
