= WIZM-FM =

- La Crosse, Wisconsin; United States
- Broadcast area: La Crosse, Wisconsin
- Frequency: 93.3 MHz
- Branding: Z93

Programming
- Language: English
- Format: Contemporary hit radio
- Affiliations: United Stations Radio Networks

Ownership
- Owner: Mid-West Family Broadcasting; (Family Radio, Inc.)
- Sister stations: WIZM (AM), WKTY, WRQT, KCLH, KQYB

History
- First air date: 1966 (as WWLA)
- Former call signs: WWLA (1966-1976)

Technical information
- Licensing authority: FCC
- Facility ID: 20665
- Class: C
- ERP: 100,000 watts
- HAAT: 165.0 meters (541.3 ft)
- Transmitter coordinates: 43°48′23.00″N 91°22′4.00″W

Links
- Public license information: Public file; LMS
- Webcast: Listen live
- Website: z933.com

WIZM-FM (93.3 FM) is a radio station in La Crosse, Wisconsin that plays top 40 and pop music. It airs a contemporary hit radio format. Licensed to La Crosse, Wisconsin, United States, the station serves the La Crosse area. The station is currently owned by Mid-West Family Broadcasting.

WIZM-FM is the Local Primary-1 (LP-1) station for the Emergency Alert System for La Crosse and throughout the Southwest Region of the state.

== History ==
On November 27, 1963, the Federal Communications Commission (FCC) granted William E. and Louise A. Bruring a construction permit for a new Class C FM station on 93.3 MHz in La Crosse. The Brurings each held a 50-percent interest and also owned a communications-equipment business; the original permit authorized 51,000 watts effective radiated power (ERP) and an antenna approximately 490 feet (150 m) height above average terrain (HAAT). The station was assigned the call sign WWLA. On August 20, 1965, the FCC modified the permit to authorize 100,000 watts ERP and 540 feet (165 m) HAAT, along with changes to the antenna, transmitter and studio locations.

A reception-verification letter signed by William Bruring in 1975 gave December 6, 1966, as the date WWLA went on the air. The FCC issued the station's first license on December 20, 1967, specifying 100,000 watts ERP and 540 feet HAAT.

WWLA initially programmed beautiful music, according to a later station retrospective. In August 1974, Billboard still characterized WWLA-FM as a beautiful-music operation but reported that it was scheduling oldies throughout the day and more current music during the evening; program director Gary DeMaroney said its playlist included 30 current records. The station retrospective dated WWLA's conversion to a Top 40 format to 1974 and stated that it was using the "LA-93" name by early 1976.

The FCC received an application on March 15, 1976, to assign WWLA's license from the Brurings to Family Radio, Inc., owner of the separately licensed WIZM on 1410 AM. Broadcasting reported that the transaction had been announced on March 24 and valued it at $250,000 plus a $48,000 noncompetition agreement; the filing attributed the sale to William Bruring's health. The FCC granted the assignment on May 20, and it became effective on June 15. The commission granted a move of the main studio to County Trunk B in Medary on June 17, and the call sign became WIZM-FM on July 6. According to the station retrospective, Family Radio adopted the "Z-93" name following the acquisition.

In 1982, WIZM-FM sought authority to relocate its transmitter, increase its antenna height to approximately 1,021 feet (311 m) HAAT and alter its transmitter power output; the application was announced on August 20. The FCC granted the construction permit on November 17. By 1988, FM Atlas and Station Directory listed WIZM-FM as "Z-93", operating with 100,000 watts ERP and 311 m HAAT.

On February 12, 2013, WIZM-FM's morning program played a recording of a false Emergency Alert System warning about a "zombie attack" that had been broadcast in Montana. Because WIZM-FM was the local primary Emergency Alert System station, the recording's alert tones activated equipment at television station WKBT-DT, which automatically relayed the false message and the radio hosts' laughter. WIZM-FM manager Brian Michaels apologized for the broadcast, while WKBT adjusted its alert equipment to reduce the possibility of a recurrence. In a 2016 rulemaking notice, the FCC described WIZM-FM's triggering of the television station's alert system as inadvertent.

The FCC renewed Family Radio's license on November 20, 2020, identifying the station as WIZM-FM, Facility ID 20665, on 93.3 MHz at La Crosse. In July 2026, the station's website identified the operation with Mid-West Family La Crosse and used the Z93 name for its hit-music programming.
