= WLMV =

Spanish-language music and talk station in Madison, Wisconsin, United States

- Madison, Wisconsin; United States
- Frequency: 1480 kHz
- Branding: La Movida 94.5 & 1480 ("The Move")

Programming
- Format: Spanish Full Service
- Affiliations: CNN en Español

Ownership
- Owner: Mid-West Family Broadcasting; (Mid-West Management, Inc)
- Sister stations: WHIT, WJJO, WJQM, WMGN, WOZN, WRIS-FM, WWQM-FM, WNTA

History
- First air date: 1948; 78 years ago (as WISC)
- Former call signs: WVOW (1947); WISC (1947–1959); WISM (1959–1984); WTDY (1984–1998); WTDA (1998–2002)
- Call sign meaning: "La Movida"

Technical information
- Licensing authority: FCC
- Facility ID: 41901
- Class: B
- Power: 5,000 watts
- Transmitter coordinates: 43°1′30″N 89°23′48″W
- Translator: 94.5 W233CN (Madison)

Links
- Public license information: Public file; LMS
- Webcast: Listen Live
- Website: lamovidaradio.com

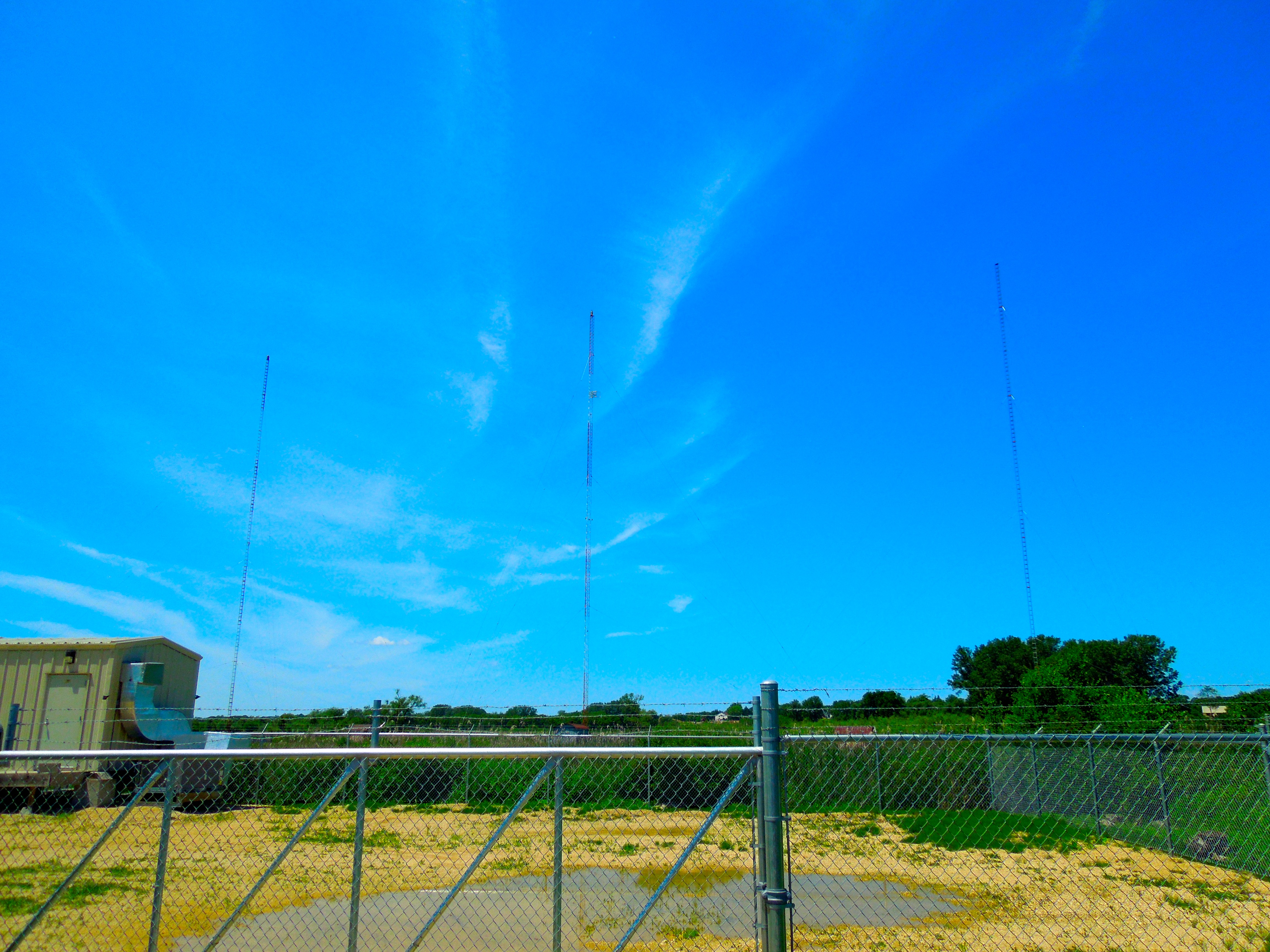
WLMV Towers

WLMV (1480 AM), branded as "La Movida 94.5 & 1480", is a radio station serving the Madison, Wisconsin area. Owned by Mid-West Family Broadcasting, the station airs local Spanish language music and talk programming, along with national news breaks from CNN en Español Radio.

== History ==
WLMV originated from a 1944 application by Radio Wisconsin, Inc. to build a new station in Madison on 1480 kHz. The station's construction permit was briefly assigned the call letters WVOW, which were changed on August 20, 1947, to WISC. In 1959 the call sign became WISM, and the station was known for its long-time Top 40 and later automated oldies formats. For years, WISM was the popular Top 40 radio station in Madison and was the first station in Wisconsin to broadcast in AM stereo in the early 1980s: ("Both Sides Now" by Judy Collins was the first song WISM played in AM stereo). In 1984 the call sign was changed to WTDY, which originally stood for "Today Radio," a format that featured a mix of music, news, sports and weather, with the station eventually moving to a full news/talk format.

=== Expanded Band assignment ===
On March 17, 1997, the Federal Communications Commission (FCC) announced that 88 stations had been given permission to move to newly available "Expanded Band" transmitting frequencies, ranging from 1610 to 1700 kHz, with WTDY authorized to move from 1480 to 1670 kHz.

A construction permit for the expanded band station was assigned the callsign WAWY on January 9, 1998. The FCC's initial policy was that both the original station and its expanded band counterpart could operate simultaneously for up to five years, after which owners would have to turn in one of the two licenses, depending on whether they preferred the new assignment or elected to remain on the original frequency. However, this deadline has been extended multiple times, and both stations have remained authorized. One restriction is that the FCC has generally required paired original and expanded band stations to remain under common ownership.

=== Later history ===
On June 12, 1998, the callsign WTDY was transferred from 1480 AM to the new expanded band station at 1670 AM, while 1480 AM became WTDA. Initially programming was simulcast by both stations. When WTDY's move to 1670 AM became permanent in 2002, Mid-West Family Broadcasting rechristened 1480 AM as WLMV, attracting a rapidly growing Latino audience in Madison as the market's first full-time Spanish-language station (and one of only two such stations in the market, with WTTN joining ESPN Deportes in 2009 until 2017).

Logo before translator sign on

WLMV began an FM simulcast on W233CN (94.5 MHz) in October 2017.
