= WIBA (AM) =

News/talk radio station in Madison, Wisconsin, United States

- Madison, Wisconsin; United States
- Broadcast area: Madison metropolitan area
- Frequency: 1310 kHz
- Branding: News/Talk 1310 WIBA

Programming
- Format: News/Talk
- Affiliations: Fox News Radio; Compass Media Networks; Premiere Networks; Westwood One; Packers Radio Network; Wisconsin Badgers Radio Network

Ownership
- Owner: iHeartMedia; (iHM Licenses, LLC)
- Sister stations: WIBA-FM; WMAD; WTSO; WXXM; WZEE

History
- First air date: April 2, 1925; 100 years ago
- Call sign meaning: "Wisconsin and Badger Broadcasting" (former owner)

Technical information
- Licensing authority: FCC
- Facility ID: 17384
- Class: B
- Power: 5,000 watts
- Transmitter coordinates: 42°59′58″N 89°25′47″W

Links
- Public license information: Public file; LMS
- Webcast: Listen live (via iHeartRadio)
- Website: wiba.iheart.com

WIBA (1310 kHz) is a commercial AM radio station licensed to Madison, Wisconsin. Owned by iHeartMedia, the station airs a news/talk format, under the slogan "Madison's News/Talk Station".

WIBA operates at 5,000 watts around the clock. By day, the station is non-directional, at night it uses a directional antenna to protect other stations on 1310 AM. The station's studios, offices and transmitter are located off South Fish Hatchery Road at Lacy Road in Fitchburg, Wisconsin.

== Programming ==
=== Talk shows ===
Weekdays begin with a local news and interview show, Madison in the Morning with Robin Colbert and Shawn Prebil. In 2023, veteran sportscaster Doug Russell was added to handle sports reports at :15 and :45 past the hour. In middays, local host Vicki McKenna is heard, with one hour of her show shared with sister station WISN 1130 AM in Milwaukee. In afternoons, WISN's Dan O'Donnell Show is also simulcast on WIBA. The rest of the weekday schedule is syndicated programs, mostly from co-owned Premiere Networks: The Clay Travis and Buck Sexton Show, The Sean Hannity Show, The Mark Levin Show, Coast to Coast AM with George Noory and This Morning, America's First News with Gordon Deal.

Weekends feature shows on money, health, and technology. They include The Ramsey Show with Dave Ramsey, The Kim Komando Show, Jill Schlesinger on Money, Armstrong & Getty, Somewhere in Time with Art Bell, Sunday Night with Bill Cunningham and Markley, Van Camp & Robbins, as well as repeats of weekday shows. Some paid brokered programming also airs. Most hours begin with an update from Fox News Radio.

=== Sports ===
WIBA serves as the flagship station for the Wisconsin Badgers radio network. It is also the Madison outlet for Green Bay Packers football broadcasts.

== History ==
WIBA logo until March 2020.

=== Capital Times ===
WIBA is one of the oldest radio stations in Wisconsin, first licensed on March 24, 1925, to the Capital Times Studio. The WIBA call sign was issued from a sequential list of available call letters. It signed on the air on April 2, 1925. WIBA was owned by the Capital Times newspaper, with studios at 111 King Street. It eventually became an NBC Red Network affiliate, carrying NBC's dramas, comedies, news, and sports during the "Golden Age of Radio".

Willard Waterman, who later gained fame playing the title role on The Great Gildersleeve, was a member of a quartet at WIBA in his early years in radio. In 1963, he recalled: "[W]e sang musical interludes between programs."

Johnny Olson, known for his announcing work with Goodson-Todman game shows, had his first radio job at WIBA.

Following the establishment of the Federal Radio Commission (FRC), stations were initially issued a series of temporary authorizations starting on May 3, 1927. In addition, they were informed that if they wanted to continue operating, they needed to file a formal license application by January 15, 1928, as the first step in determining whether they met the new "public interest, convenience, or necessity" standard.

On May 25, 1928, the FRC issued General Order 32, which notified 164 stations, including WIBA, that: "From an examination of your application for future license it does not find that public interest, convenience, or necessity would be served by granting it." However, the station successfully convinced the commission that it should remain licensed.

On November 11, 1928, the FRC made a major reallocation of station transmitting frequencies, as part of a reorganization resulting from its implementation of General Order 40. WIBA was assigned to 1210 kHz.

=== Power increase and FM station ===
On October 8, 1935, the Federal Communications Commission authorized WIBA to increase its power to 5,000 watts (daytime) and 1,000 watts (nights). On March 29, 1941, the station moved from 1280 kHz to 1310 kHz, as part of the implementation of the North American Regional Broadcasting Agreement (NARBA).

In 1969, it added an FM sister station, WIBA-FM at 101.5. In its early years, 101.5 FM would mostly simulcast AM 1310. It began its own programming in the mid-1970s with a free form progressive rock format..

=== Talk and sports ===
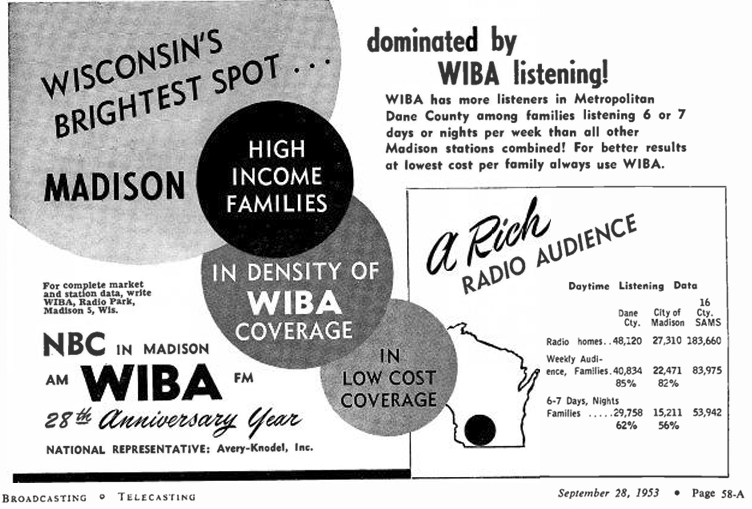
1953 station advertisement.

In the 1950s, as network programming moved from radio to television, WIBA began a middle of the road format, with popular adult music, as well as news and sports. As music listening moved from to the FM dial from AM in the 1980s, WIBA added more talk shows, including evening syndicated programs from NBC Talknet. By the 1990s, it had eliminated music and was a talk radio station..

Throughout WIBA's history, it has been the home of Wisconsin Badgers play by play. The station also carries the Green Bay Packers. It had been the Madison station for the Milwaukee Brewers Radio Network but gave up that affiliation. Locally WOZN 1670 AM now carries Brewers games.

In 2000, WIBA-AM-FM were acquired by Capstar Communications. That company was later folded into Clear Channel Communications. And in 2014, Clear Channel changed its name to the current iHeartMedia, Inc. Also in 2014, WIBA laid off late-morning local host Mitch Henck. It was attributed to a company-wide plan to reduce staff as a cost-cutting move.

== Bibliography ==
- "Station WIBA, for 14 years associated with The Capital Times, has made fine record". Capital Times. December 13, 1938. "article about WIBA's 14th birthday (Wisconsin Historical Society))"
