= Mid-West Family Broadcasting =

- Company type: Private
- Industry: Broadcast Media, Entertainment
- Headquarters: Madison, Wisconsin
- Products: Radio, Advertising, Digital Marketing
- Website: midwestfamilyofcompanies.org

Mid-West Family Broadcasting is an independently owned broadcasting company based in Madison, Wisconsin. The company owns and manages radio stations in Madison, Wisconsin, Eau Claire, Wisconsin, La Crosse, Wisconsin, Benton Harbor/St. Joseph, Michigan, South Bend/Elkhart, Indiana, Springfield, Illinois, Springfield, Missouri, and Rockford, Illinois. In 2013 Mid-West Family purchased the Maverick stations in Rockford, Illinois and Eau Claire, Wisconsin. This added 11 stations starting May 1, 2013 with an LMA.

On November 2, 2015, Gray Television agreed to sell the WSBT radio group to Mid-West Family when the deal to acquire the television and radio assets of Schurz Communications closed. This added four stations in the Michiana area to Mid-West's lineup.

== Owned & operated stations ==
DeKalb, Illinois

- WDKB - 94.9 FM - Hot Adult Contemporary

Eau Claire, Wisconsin

- WAYY - 790 AM / 105.1 FM - News/sports
- WEAQ - 1150 AM / 95.9 FM - Farm news/classic country
- WECL - 92.9 FM - Active rock
- WIAL - 94.1 FM - Hot AC
- WISM-FM - 98.1 FM - Classic Hits
- WAXX - 104.5 FM - Country

Madison, Wisconsin

- WLMV - 1480 AM / 94.5 FM - Latin pop
- WHIT - 1550 AM / 97.7 FM- Classic country
- WOZN - 1670 AM / 96.7 FM - sports talk
- WJQM - 93.1 FM - Rhythmic top 40
- WJJO - 94.1 FM - Active rock
- WMGN - 98.1 FM - Adult contemporary
- WWQM-FM - 106.3 FM - Country music
- WRIS-FM - 106.7 FM - Alternative rock

La Crosse, Wisconsin

- WKTY - 580 AM / 96.7 FM - Sports
- WIZM - 1410 AM / 92.3 FM / 106.7 FM - News/talk
- WIZM-FM - 93.3 FM - Top 40/CHR
- KCLH - 94.7 FM - Classic hits
- WRQT - 95.7 FM - Active rock
- KQYB - 98.3 FM / 103.9 FM / 107.7 FM - Country

St. Joseph/Benton Harbor/South Haven, Michigan

- WQYQ - 1400 AM / 106.1 FM - Sports
- WSJM-FM - 94.9 FM - News/Talk/Sports
- WRRA-FM - 97.5 FM - Country
- WCXT - 98.3 FM / 96.1 FM - Alternative Rock
- WCSY-FM - 103.7 FM - Classic Hits
- WIRX - 107.1 FM - Mainstream Rock

South Bend, Indiana/Elkhart, Indiana

- WSBT - 960 AM - Sports
- WNSN - 101.5 FM - Adult Contemporary
- WYRX-FM - 94.3 FM - Mainstream rock
- WYTZ-FM - 99.9 FM - Country
- WYTZ-FM HD3 - 107.9 FM - Christmas

Springfield, Missouri

- KOSP - 92.9 FM - Rhythmic top 40
- KQRA - 102.1 FM - Modern rock
- KKLH - 104.7 FM - Classic rock
- KOMG - 105.1 FM - Country

Rockford, Illinois

- WRTB - "The Bull" - 95.3 FM - Country
- WGFB - 103.1 FM - Adult contemporary/AC
- WXRX - 104.9 FM - Active rock
- WXRX-HD2 - 100.5 - Classic hits
- WNTA - 1330 AM / 97.1 FM - Sports talk
