= WJQM =

Coordinates: 43.159°N 89.215°W

- DeForest, Wisconsin; United States
- Broadcast area: Madison, Wisconsin
- Frequency: 93.1 MHz
- Branding: "93.1 Jamz"

Programming
- Format: Rhythmic Contemporary
- Affiliations: Premiere Networks; United Stations Radio Networks

Ownership
- Owner: Mid-West Family Broadcasting
- Sister stations: WHIT, WJJO, WLMV, WMGN, WOZN, WRIS-FM, WWQM-FM

History
- First air date: July 2003
- Former call signs: WHIT (7/2003-12/2005); WHLK (2005–2008)
- Call sign meaning: Derived from "Jamz" the Q represents an A.

Technical information
- Licensing authority: FCC
- Facility ID: 78226
- Class: A
- ERP: 6,000 watts horizontal 5,400 watts vertical
- HAAT: 98 meters (322 ft)

Links
- Public license information: Public file; LMS
- Webcast: Listen Live
- Website: madtownjamz.com

WJQM (93.1 FM) is a radio station serving Madison, Wisconsin and surrounding areas. The station is owned by Mid-West Family Broadcasting and launched a rhythmic contemporary format as "106.7 Jamz" in January 2007 before moving to 93.1 FM in October 2008. Over the years, WJQM has shifted to a more urban contemporary direction with some rhythmic contemporary songs remaining in the rotation. WJQM is an affiliate of The Breakfast Club morning show, the Bootleg Kev Show in weeknights, and is the only urban-focused commercial radio station in Wisconsin outside of the Milwaukee radio market.

WJQM features shows such as "The Throwback Lunch" which features old school and some throwback rhythmic hits, an afternoon mix show hosted by locally based DJ Fusion and features Madison and Wisconsin-based hip hop and R&B artists in features dubbed "local love", as well as a show featuring local talent on Sunday nights.

== History ==
WJQM was launched in July 2003 under the WHIT call sign. While testing its signal, the station aired themes from various classic TV shows under the moniker "TV93" before launching into "timeless rock" as "93.1 The Lake" on July 25, 2003. The first song played was "Rock'n Me" by Steve Miller.

=== WHLK "The Lake" ===
In December 2005, (the month WHIT changed call letters to WHLK), "The Lake" began simulcasting on new frequency 106.7 (WSLK). This simulcast ended in January 2007, when WSLK became a Rhythmic Hits station (WJQM).

By the beginning of 2007, the station had evolved into a harder-edged classic rock station, highlighted by a new morning drive-time show hosted by former WJJO personality Greg Bair as well as a new station logo and imaging ("Everything Classic Rock"). The station's classic rock format ended with The End by The Doors around midnight October 28, 2008. Many of the on air personalities returned to other Mid-West Family Broadcasting stations in the Madison area. 93.1 switched to WJQM and 106.7 now simulcasts Madison sports talk station WOZN (AM 1670, formerly WOZN) as WOZN-FM.

=== WJQM "93.1 Jamz" ===
Logo that was used from 2008 to 2014.

Mid-West Family Broadcasting began simulcasting WJQM "93.1 Jamz" on 93.1 and 106.7 FM on October 28, 2008, with the WJQM call sign moving to 93.1. 106.7 FM, the previous home of "WJQM" switched to call sign WWQN in preparation for the WWQM-FM simulcast which began on November 3, 2008. (The 106.7 signal currently carries alternative rock as WRIS-FM.)

The primary reason for the switch from 106.7 to 93.1 was to provide a clear signal into all of Madison, which has always been the target audience for the Rhythmic Top 40 station. The 106.7 signal provided fair to poor coverage into Madison, with its main coverage area consisting of rural towns in southwest Wisconsin.

On October 31, 2018, several staff members, including the station's Program Director, as well as its night show host, were laid off, with management citing a different direction for the radio station. In subsequent years, WJQM has shifted to a more hip hop-oriented urban contemporary direction closer to its predecessor WKPO, and picked up syndicated shows The Breakfast Club in morning drive, and the Bootleg Kev show for evenings.
