= WHIT =

Coordinates: 43°00′08″N 89°23′13″W

Madison, Wisconsin; United States
- Frequency: 1550 kHz
- Branding: 97.7 The Farm

Programming
- Format: Classic country

Ownership
- Owner: Mid-West Family Broadcasting
- Sister stations: WJJO, WJQM, WLMV, WMGN, WOZN, WRIS-FM, WWQM-FM

History
- First air date: August 12, 1964
- Former call signs: WMAD (1964–1977); WWQM (1977–1982); WHIT (1982–2001); WTUX (2001–2009)
- Call sign meaning: HIT Radio (previous format)

Technical information
- Licensing authority: FCC
- Facility ID: 19622
- Class: D
- Power: 5,000 watts (daytime only)
- Translator: 97.7 W249DH (Madison)

Links
- Public license information: Public file; LMS
- Webcast: Listen Live!
- Website: thefarmwi.com

WHIT (1550 AM) is a radio station based in Madison, Wisconsin and broadcasting a classic country format. The station is owned by Mid-West Family Broadcasting.

== History ==
WHIT began broadcasting in 1948, licensed to Madison and operating with a daytime power of 5,000 watts. In its early decades, the station was known for its "Full Service" and "Middle of the Road" (MOR) music approach, often branding itself as a station for "Good Music" to distinguish it from the emerging rock and roll stations in the market.

By the 1970s, WHIT transitioned to a country music format, which remained its primary identity for nearly two decades. The station was a prominent local affiliate for Nashville-based programming and live country music news. In the mid-1990s, the station experimented with various formats, including oldies and adult standards, as listener habits shifted toward the FM dial.

By the late 1990s/early 2000s, the station was airing an all-sports format known as "The Team."

In 2001, the station turned to an adult standards format as WTUX ("The Tux"), affiliated with the Music of Your Life, Jones Standards and Dial Global America's Best Music networks. On January 19, 2009, the station dropped adult standards and switched back to an automated oldies format, readopting the WHIT legacy call sign and focusing on music from the 1950s and 1960s. (As part of WHIT's flip, another Mid-West Family station in Michigan that had the WHIT call sign was assigned the WSCY calls to match its FM simulcast station.) WHIT played oldies on an automated basis until joining the nationally distributed True Oldies Channel on November 14, 2011.

On December 6, 2013, WHIT changed their format from oldies to classic country, branded as "Hank on AM 1550".

On October 8, 2020, WHIT relaunched as "97.7 The Farm", retaining the classic country format, but with enhanced farm news coverage from Pam Jahnke’s "Mid-West Farm Report" daily from 5–6am. Jahnke and Josh Scramlin have additional news updates and features all day on The Farm.

== Previous logos ==
(WHIT's logo under previous oldies format) (WHIT's logo under previous "Hank" branding)
