= WIZM (AM) =

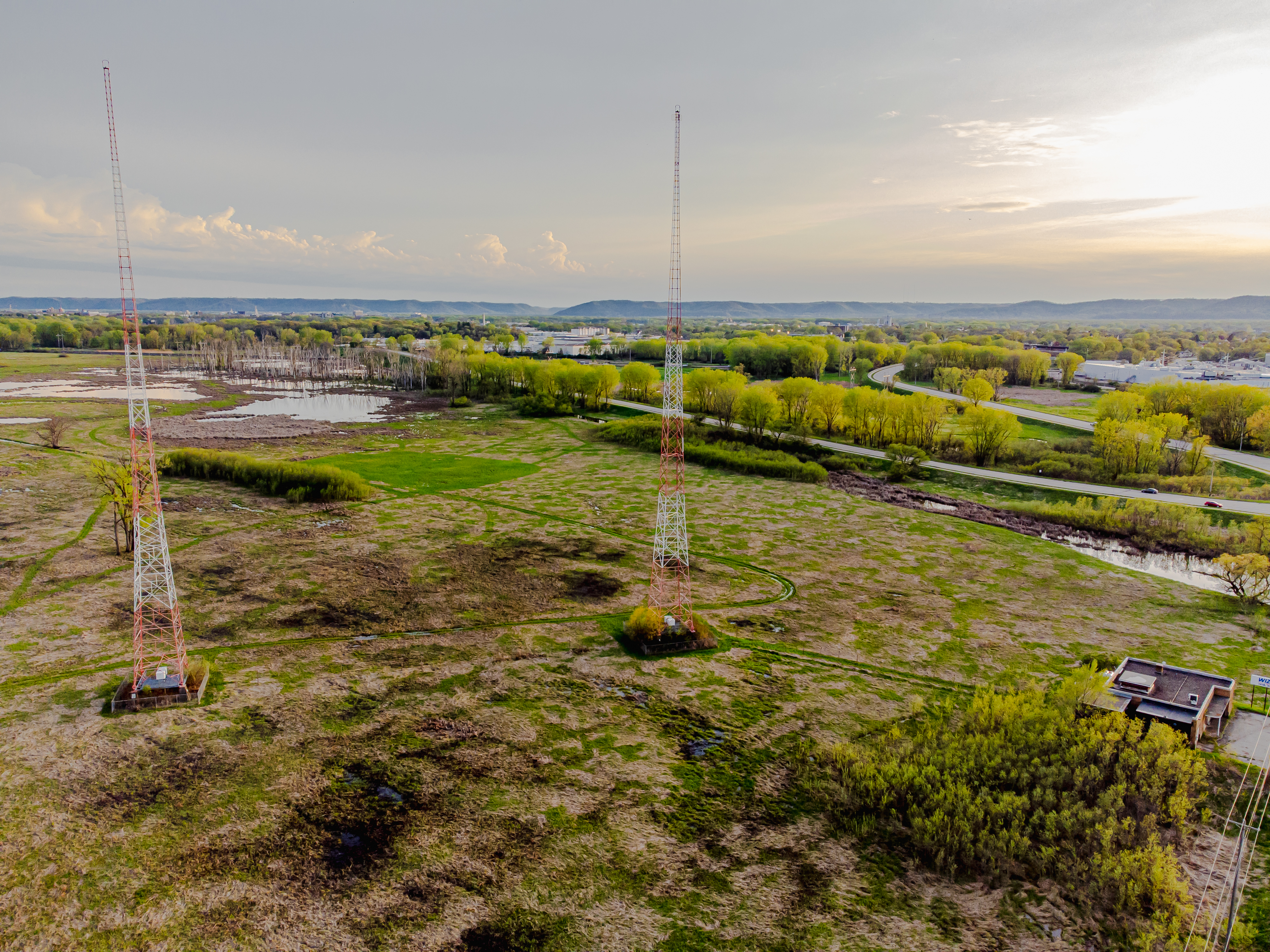
- La Crosse, Wisconsin; United States
- Broadcast area: La Crosse, Wisconsin
- Frequency: 1410 kHz
- Branding: WIZM NewsTalk 1410AM 92.3FM

Programming
- Format: News Talk Information
- Affiliations: Fox News Radio; Premiere Networks; Westwood One; Motor Racing Network; Performance Racing Network

Ownership
- Owner: Mid-West Family Broadcasting; (Family Radio, Inc.)
- Sister stations: WIZM-FM, WRQT, KQYB, KCLH, WKTY

History
- First air date: August 19, 1926 (as WKBH)
- Former call signs: WKBH (1926–1971)

Technical information
- Licensing authority: FCC
- Facility ID: 20667
- Class: B
- Power: 5,000 watts
- Transmitter coordinates: 43°50′48.00″N 91°13′3.00″W
- Translators: 92.3 K222AG (La Crosse); 106.7 W294CU (La Crosse)

Links
- Public license information: Public file; LMS
- Webcast: Listen Live
- Website: wizmnews.com

WIZM (1410 kHz, “WIZM NewsTalk 1410AM, 92.3FM”) is an AM radio station broadcasting a News Talk Information format. Licensed to La Crosse, Wisconsin, United States, the station serves the La Crosse area. The station is currently owned by Mid-West Family Broadcasting, and features programming from Fox News Radio, Premiere Networks, and Westwood One.

== Programming ==
WIZM carries The Glenn Beck Program, Sean Hannity, The Rush Limbaugh Show, Dave Ramsey, Coast to Coast AM, and La Crosse Talk PM with Rick Solem. The station is also the local radio affiliate for NASCAR races via the Motor Racing Network and the Performance Racing Network.

== History ==
WIZM was first licensed, with the sequentially assigned callsign WKBH, in August 1926 to the Callaway Music Company at 211 Main Street in La Crosse. In 1971 the station was purchased by Family Radio, Inc., and on July 14, 1971, the callsign was changed to WIZM.
