= WRIS-FM =

Coordinates: 43°0′8.9″N 89°52′25.3″W

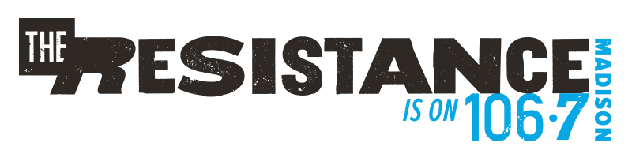
- Mount Horeb, Wisconsin; United States
- Broadcast area: Madison, Wisconsin
- Frequency: 106.7 MHz
- Branding: The Resistance 106.7

Programming
- Format: Alternative rock

Ownership
- Owner: Mid-West Family Broadcasting
- Sister stations: WHIT, WJJO, WJQM, WLMV, WMGN, WOZN, WWQM-FM

History
- First air date: October 2005 (as WYZM)
- Former call signs: WYZM (10/2005-12/2005); WSLK (12/2005-1/2007); WJQM (1/2007-11/2008); WWQN (11/2008-12/2011); WTDY-FM (12/2011-12/2012); WOZN-FM (12/2012-10/2017)
- Call sign meaning: ResIStance

Technical information
- Licensing authority: FCC
- Facility ID: 89056
- Class: A
- ERP: 2,900 watts
- HAAT: 146 meters

Links
- Public license information: Public file; LMS
- Webcast: Listen Live
- Website: AltMad.com

WRIS-FM (106.7 FM) is a radio station licensed to Mount Horeb, Wisconsin and serving the Madison market. The station is owned by Mid-West Family Broadcasting and airs an alternative rock format as "The Resistance 106.7." WRIS-FM broadcasts from a tower near Barneveld, Wisconsin, about 25 miles west of Madison.

== History ==
WRIS-FM's history dates back to October 2005, when Mid-West Family Broadcasting began testing the 106.7 FM signal under the call sign WYZM, airing smooth jazz music normally heard on sister station WMGN during its "Magic Sunday Morning" program. The smooth jazz was there only temporarily, for on December 1, 2005, WYZM changed to WSLK and began simulcasting the classic hits format of sister station WHLK ("The Lake at 93-1 and 106-7").

At 4 p.m. on January 26, 2007, WSLK broke away from the "Lake" simulcast and began a rhythmic contemporary format, identifying themselves as WJQM, or "106.7 Jamz." This move was in direct response to WKPO dropping the Rhythmic format two weeks earlier. "Jamz" remained on 106.7 until October 28, 2008, when they would move to 93.1 FM, displacing "The Lake" and moving "Jamz" to a signal that better serves the urban areas of Madison (whereas the 106.7 signal covers the more rural area of Iowa County and western Dane County). After one more week of simulcasting "93-1 Jamz," 106.7 would adopt the WWQN call sign and become a simulcast of country sister station WWQM-FM, allowing "Q106" to cover the aforementioned rural Western areas that WWQM's Class A signal on 106.3 could not quite cover entirely.

WWQN would retain the "Q106" simulcast until December 13, 2011, when, 12 days after adopting the WTDY-FM call sign, it began simulcast of its news/talk sister station WTDY. The move would give the low-rated WTDY a presence on the clearer FM radio band, albeit on a signal that only covered Madison's fringes. The full WTDY schedule was simulcast on WTDY-FM, including local shows Sly in the Morning and Forward with Kurt Baron; full-hour local newscasts at 12 p.m. and 5 p.m.; national shows including Michael Smerconish and America's Radio News; and weekend broadcasts of NFL and college sports from Compass Media Networks and Sports USA.

News/talk programming continued on WTDY-FM until November 21, 2012, when morning host John "Sly" Sylvester and the station's entire news staff received layoff notices and automated Christmas music began playing. The Christmas stunting lasted until the weekend of December 29, 2012, replaced by a two-song loop of "Wherever I May Roam" by Metallica and "Welcome to the Jungle" by Guns N' Roses. The loop ended at 11 a.m. on January 2, 2013, when both 1670 AM and 106.7 FM (identifying as WOZN and WOZN-FM) unveiled a sports talk format branded as "The Zone," launching with the CBS Sports Radio debut of The Jim Rome Show ("Welcome to the Jungle" is its opening theme). (The WTDY-FM call letters were reassigned to a station in Philadelphia in 2017.) During its time as a sports-formatted station, WOZN-FM relied on a combination of CBS Sports Radio, local, and state-wide programming, the latter including "The Bill Michaels Show" (11AM-2PM), which originates from Milwaukee's WSSP. "The Zone" also featured live game broadcasts of the United States Hockey League's Madison Capitols as well as the Northwoods League's Madison Mallards.

On October 31, 2017, with a new Madison-centered FM simulcast in place for WOZN (via W244DR, at 96.7 FM), Mid-West Family broke 106.7 away from "The Zone" and launched a new alternative rock format branded as "The Resistance 106.7" under new call letters WRIS-FM. The first song on "The Resistance" was "It's the End of the World as We Know It" by R.E.M. The flip returns the alternative format to the Madison market for the first time since 2005, when WMAD flipped to country.

== See also ==
- Mid-West Family Broadcasting
