= WTKM-FM =

Coordinates: 43.280°N 88.384°W

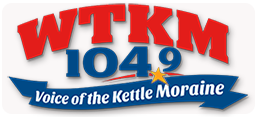

Hartford, Wisconsin; United States
- Broadcast area: Greater Milwaukee
- Frequency: 104.9 MHz
- Branding: WTKM-FM

Programming
- Format: Classic country (with full service news, weather and sports)

Ownership
- Owner: Tomsun Media, LLC
- Sister stations: WPTT

History
- First air date: October 1, 1973
- Call sign meaning: The Kettle Moraine

Technical information
- Licensing authority: FCC
- Facility ID: 34303
- Class: A
- ERP: 5,800 watts
- HAAT: 91 meters (299 ft)

Links
- Public license information: Public file; LMS
- Website: www.wtkm.com

WTKM-FM (104.9 FM) is a commercial radio station licensed to Hartford, Wisconsin, United States, and serving the Greater Milwaukee market. It is owned by Tomsun Media, LLC, which is operated by David and Connie Stout. The studios are on North Main Street at Summer Street. WTKM-FM airs a full service format of classic country music, with local news, weather, talk and high school sports.

WTKM-FM's transmitter is sited on West Waterford Road in Hartford.

== History ==
WTKM-FM signed on the air on October 1, 1973. This was made possible when another station, WTTN-FM in Watertown (now WJJO), moved from 104.7 to 94.1 FM. That allowed WTKM to apply for an FM license on 104.9 MHz to simulcast 1540 AM, which is a daytimer station, required to go off the air at night. WTKM-FM's signal mostly covers the northwestern portion of Milwaukee and its suburbs.

WTKM-AM-FM played mostly polka music for many years. The Milwaukee area has a number of residents who trace their histories to Poland and other Eastern European countries where polka music is popular. For many years, WTKM-AM-FM were the only radio stations in the U.S. with a full-time polka format. The stations had a fiercely loyal listener base where some fans built special antennas just to receive their signal.

In 2007, WTKM 1540 and WTKM-FM 104.9 split their programming. The AM station began airing oldies. WTKM-FM later began playing classic country music. Polka music is no longer programmed on the stations.
