= WPTT (AM) =

Coordinates: 43°16′48″N 88°23′02″W

- Hartford, Wisconsin; United States
- Broadcast area: Greater Milwaukee
- Frequency: 1540 kHz
- Branding: Classic Oldies 1540 AM

Programming
- Language: English
- Format: Oldies

Ownership
- Owner: Tomsun Media LLC
- Sister stations: WTKM-FM

History
- First air date: 1951
- Former call signs: WTKM (1951–2017)
- Call sign meaning: Party (former branding)

Technical information
- Licensing authority: FCC
- Facility ID: 34302
- Class: D
- Power: 500 watts (days only)

Links
- Public license information: Public file; LMS

WPTT (1540 AM, "Classic Oldies 1540 AM") is a commercial radio station licensed to Hartford, Wisconsin, United States, serving the Greater Milwaukee market during the daytime hours only. It airs an oldies format and is owned by Tomsun Media LLC, which is operated by David and Connie Stout. The radio studios are on North Main Street at Summer Street in Hartford.

WPTT's transmitter is co-located with WTKM-FM's tower, on West Waterford Road.

== History ==
=== WTKM: Polka Music ===
The station signed on the air in 1951. Its original call sign was WTKM. In 1973, it added a sister station, WTKM-FM at 104.9 MHz. Both stations played polka music with other full service radio features of news, weather, talk and local high school sports. Greater Milwaukee has a number of residents who trace their history to Poland and other Eastern European countries where polka music is popular.

Most of WTKM's programming was simulcast on both the AM and FM stations. However, on Sundays afternoons, the AM station aired separate German Language and music programming called "The Voice Of Germany". Each weekday afternoon, for Catholic listeners, the station recited "The Holy Rosary".

=== Cruisin' 1540 ===
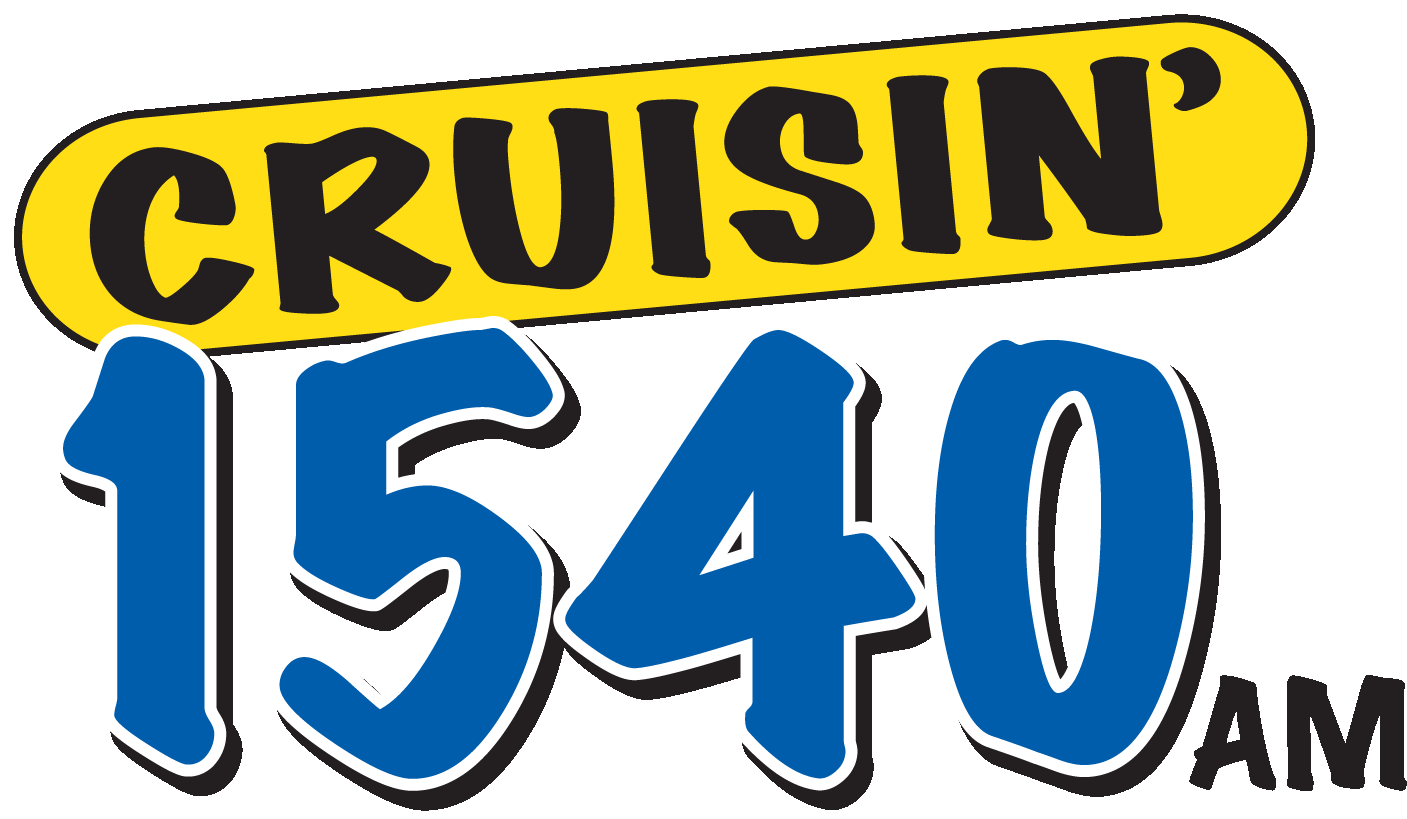
WTKM logo, 2009-2017

On December 1, 2009, WTKM 1540 separated its programming from WTKM-FM 104.9. The AM station launched an oldies format, as "Cruisin' 1540". Cruisin' played hits from the 1950s, 60s and 70s, including The Beatles, The Beach Boys, Motown and more.

In 2017, a Sunday afternoon polka music show was added that had been airing on sister station WTKM-FM. Cruisin 1540 also kept many of its full service elements of news, weather, talk and high school sports.

=== WPTT: Party 92.9 FM ===
On September 1, 2017, at 1 p.m., WTKM signed on an FM translator at 92.9 FM. The AM station changed its call sign to WPTT, and flipped to an adult hits format leaning towards upbeat songs as "Party 92.9". Key artists include Madonna, Michael Jackson and Lady Gaga. 92.9 W225CP has been approved by the FCC to move their antenna and change the city of license to Milwaukee as of 5/24/24. On February 11, 2025, the sale of W225CP to The Family Radio Network of Wisconsin for $320,000 was approved by the FCC. Family then began airing their Contemporary Christian network on 92.9, and WPTT went back to being AM only as "Classic Oldies 1540 AM".
