= WOZN (AM) =

- Madison, Wisconsin; United States
- Broadcast area: Madison Metro
- Frequency: 1670 kHz
- Branding: 96.7FM/1670AM The Zone

Programming
- Format: Sports
- Affiliations: Infinity Sports Network; Milwaukee Brewers Radio Network

Ownership
- Owner: Mid-West Family Broadcasting; (Mid-West Management, Inc.)
- Sister stations: WHIT, WJJO, WJQM, WLMV, WMGN, WRIS-FM, WWQM-FM

History
- First air date: 1998
- Former call signs: WAWY (1998); WTDY (1998–2012); WOZN (2012–2015); WUSW (2015) (Note: Between July 6 and September 22, 2015, WOZN temporary held the WUSW call sign; this was part of a move to assign those calls to the former WQLZ in Springfield, IL.)
- Former frequencies: 1480 kHz (1948–1998; simulcast with 1670 AM, 1998-2002)

Technical information
- Licensing authority: FCC
- Facility ID: 87154
- Class: B
- Power: 10,000 watts day 1,000 watts night
- Transmitter coordinates: 43°1′31.00″N 89°23′46.00″W
- Translator: 96.7 W244DR (Madison)

Links
- Public license information: Public file; LMS
- Webcast: Listen Live
- Website: madcitysportszone.com

WOZN (1670 kHz) is a sports AM radio station licensed to and serving Madison, Wisconsin. Owned and operated by Mid-West Family Broadcasting, WOZN is also simulcast on F.M. translator W244DR (96.7 MHz).

WOZN originates from its Madison studios at 730 Ray-O-Vac Dr. on the far west side. Its single transmitter tower is located on Syene Rd. in the nearby Town of Madison, sharing a site with WLMV. The station's 1670 AM signal transmits on a non-directional antenna with daytime transmitting power of 10,000 watts reduced to 1,000 watts at sunset.

== Programming ==
"The Zone's" schedule includes programming from Infinity Sports Network, including The Jim Rome Show. Local content on the station includes the call-in show "Over the Line" with program director Ebo Thoreson; "The Bill Michaels Show", which is syndicated statewide from WOZN following the show’s departure from previous flagship WSSP in Milwaukee; and "Wisconsin Farm Report with Pam Jahnke", a statewide farm markets program that is the only holdover from WTDY's news/talk schedule. WOZN is also part of the Wisconsin Sports Zone Radio Network which originates from The Zone and provides seven daily sports updates to 13 radio stations throughout the state of Wisconsin. Other local shows on The Zone include the "Wisconsin Football Roundtable" with former Badgers Brooks Bollinger, Gabe Carimi and Matt Bernstein. Also the Wisconsin Basketball Roundtable with former Badgers Josh Gasser, Mike Bruesewitz and Charlie Wills. Both the Football and Basketball Roundtable are hosted by longtime Madison sportscaster Zach Heilprin.

Live game broadcasts on WOZN have included the United States Hockey League's Madison Capitols as well as the Northwoods League's Madison Mallards. Beginning in 2021, WOZN became part of the Milwaukee Brewers Radio Network, taking over as Madison's radio home of the Brewers from longtime affiliate WIBA.

== History ==
WOZN originated as the expanded band "twin" of an existing station on the standard AM band.

On March 17, 1997 the Federal Communications Commission (FCC) announced that 88 stations had been given permission to move to newly available "Expanded Band" transmitting frequencies, ranging from 1610 to 1700 kHz, with WTDY in Madison authorized to move from 1480 to 1670 kHz. A construction permit for the expanded band station was assigned the callsign WAWY on January 9, 1998. The FCC's initial policy was that both the original station and its expanded band counterpart could operate simultaneously for up to five years, after which owners would have to turn in one of the two licenses, depending on whether they preferred the new assignment or elected to remain on the original frequency. However, this deadline has been extended multiple times, and both stations have remained authorized. One restriction is that the FCC has generally required paired original and expanded band stations to remain under common ownership.

On June 12, 1998 the callsign WTDY and format were transferred from 1480 AM to 1670 AM, while 1480 AM became WTDA. The two stations simulcast programming until 2002, when 1480 AM became the Spanish language-formatted WLMV. As a talk station, WTDY featured a schedule with various hosts (national or local) and viewpoints (liberal, conservative, bipartisan, or apolitical). WTDY's schedule over the years featured such national hosts as Tom Leykis, Bill O'Reilly, Art Bell, and Rush Limbaugh (the station was one of The Rush Limbaugh Show's original affiliates). WTDY's local hosts over the years included Debbie Monterrey, Casey Hoff, Shawn Prebil, and Mark Belling, who worked at WTDY in its early period as a talk station before gaining prominence at Milwaukee's WISN.

Perhaps WTDY's most recognizable local figure was John "Sly" Sylvester; a longtime Madison radio personality, "Sly" began a 15-year run at WTDY in 1997, and was mainly heard in the morning slot ("Sly in the Morning") except for a brief period in middays in the mid-2000s. Employing an acerbic, provocative style on-air, "Sly" displayed his own wide-ranging political viewpoints, though he gained notoriety for his open support of pro-union protests against the controversial Act 10 legislation passed by the Wisconsin Legislature in 2011. In addition to "Sly," WTDY's schedule by 2012 included local show Forward with Kurt Baron; full hours of local news at 12PM and 5PM; national shows including Michael Smerconish and America's Radio News; and weekend broadcasts of NFL and college sports from Compass Media Networks and Sports USA.

On December 13, 2011, WTDY began simulcasting its sister station on 106.7 FM licensed to Mount Horeb, Wisconsin; the FM signal, which adopted the WTDY-FM call sign, had previously simulcast the country music format of WWQM-FM (as WWQN). Though the 106.7 FM signal only meets the fringes of Madison (its signal strength covers Western Dane County and Iowa County), the move gave WTDY (and later WOZN) a presence on the clearer FM radio band and continued a trend in recent years of spoken word formats (news, talk, or sports) moving to or simulcasting on FM signals. WTDY-FM changed call signs to WOZN-FM when 1670 AM launched the "Zone" sports format.

On November 21, 2012, Mid-West Family Broadcasting management conducted layoffs at WTDY, with "Sly" Sylvester let go along with the station's entire news staff (program director and Forward host Kurt Baron was retained in another capacity); later that day, news/talk programming on both WTDY and WTDY-FM was replaced by automated Christmas music. The Christmas stunting lasted until the weekend of December 29, 2012 in favor of a two-song loop of "Wherever I May Roam" by Metallica and "Welcome to the Jungle" by Guns N' Roses.

The loop ended at 11AM on January 2, 2013, when both 1670 AM and 106.7 FM (respectively identifying as WOZN and WOZN-FM) unveiled a sports talk format branded as "The Zone," launching with the CBS Sports Radio debut of The Jim Rome Show ("Welcome to the Jungle", used in the stunting loop, is the program's opening theme). WOZN added a low-power FM simulcast on translator W244DR (96.7 MHz) in August 2017, a signal that reaches the immediate Madison area. The sign-on of 96.7 allowed Mid-West Family to change WOZN-FM from a "Zone" simulcast to an alternative rock format (with a new call sign of WRIS-FM) on October 31 of that year.

== See also ==
- Mid-West Family Broadcasting

== Previous Logo ==
(WOZN's logo under previous simulcast with WOZN-FM 106.7)
