= WIBA-FM =

- HD2 logo

Sauk City, Wisconsin; United States
- Broadcast area: Madison, Wisconsin
- Frequency: 101.5 MHz (HD Radio)
- Branding: 101.5 WIBA-FM (HD1); U100.9 (HD2)

Programming
- Format: Classic rock
- Subchannels: HD2: Oldies
- Affiliations: United Stations Radio Networks; Westwood One; Packers Radio Network; Wisconsin Badgers football Wisconsin Badgers men's basketball

Ownership
- Owner: iHeartMedia; (iHM Licenses, LLC)
- Sister stations: WIBA (AM), WMAD, WTSO, WXXM, WZEE

History
- First air date: October 31, 1969
- Call sign meaning: "WIsconsin" + "BAdger Broadcasting" (from sister station WIBA-AM)

Technical information
- Licensing authority: FCC
- Facility ID: 17385
- Class: B
- ERP: 12,000 watts
- HAAT: 309 meters (1,014 ft)
- Transmitter coordinates: 43° 03' 21.00" N 89° 32' 6.00 " W
- Translators: 100.9 W265CV (Madison, relays HD2)

Links
- Public license information: Public file; LMS
- Webcast: Listen Live; HD2: Listen Live HD2
- Website: wibafm.iheart.com HD2: iheartumadison.iheart.com

WIBA-FM (101.5 MHz) is a radio station licensed to Sauk City, Wisconsin, United States, serving Madison and south central Wisconsin. The station is owned and operated by iHeartMedia (formerly Clear Channel Communications) and broadcasts a classic rock music format on its primary HD radio, while its HD2 channel carries an oldies format that is simulcast to analog translator station W265CV (100.9 FM).

== Station History ==
Originally licensed to the city of Madison, Wisconsin (the station's city of license would be moved to Sauk City in the 2010s), WIBA-FM commenced broadcasting on October 31, 1969, with an automated easy listening format during the daytime, and at night a live-hosted free-form mix of primarily rock, folk, and blues. The nickname “Radio Free Madison” or “RFM” was coined to distinguish the evening programming from the daytime content. During the 1970s, WIBA-FM transitioned to a full time freeform format, dropping the AM simulcast, and featuring local artists through such programs as Television, WIBA-FM's simulcast of the WMTV late-night weekend music program. In 1981 WIBA-FM overnight switched to its classic rock format.

Previous logo

WIBA-FM's current programming includes the Premiere Networks-syndicated Bob & Tom Show, heard weekdays 6AM-10AM, and Sixx Sense with Nikki Sixx in the 7PM-12AM weeknight slot. WIBA-FM also serves as Madison's FM home of Green Bay Packers football and Wisconsin Badgers football and men's basketball, in a simulcast with WIBA (AM).

=== HD Radio ===
"Mad Radio" logo for WIBA-FM-HD2 (c. 2007-2013)

WIBA-FM transmits a multiplexed HD Radio signal. The station's HD2 sidechannel launched in the mid-2000s and originally aired an all-comedy format, until converting to a commercial-free alternative rock format in 2007, chiefly employing announcers and alt-rock playlists from Clear Channel's national format lab but employing the former "Mad Radio" branding that previously used on two other Clear Channel Madison stations (at 92.1 FM and 96.3 FM).

In Fall 2013, "Mad Radio" would be replaced by a simulcast of "Socially Sound Radio," an iHeartRadio Top 40/pop channel that emphasizes songs and artists that generate interest among social media platforms. After iHeartRadio dropped Socially Sound in Summer 2014, 101.5-HD2 would feature a rotation of various iHeartRadio channels, among them "Roots of Rock" (1960s/1970s progressive/album rock), "My 80s" (80s pop songs), and "re-Covered Radio" (modern cover versions of iconic songs).

In November 2016, WIBA-FM-HD2 would convert to a simulcast of all-sports sister station WTSO (1070 AM), which already had a presence on FM since 2014 at 100.9 MHz (W265CV). The move ensured W265CV's official status as a relay of WIBA-FM, as indicated in the FCC database. The WTSO simulcast would end on February 1, 2020, when W265CV and WIBA-FM-HD2 would convert to an oldies format branded as "U100.9".

WIBA-FM briefly had an HD3 subchannel in 2012, simulcasting the news/talk format of WIBA (1310 kHz).

== Translators ==
The following analog FM translator rebroadcasts the HD2 subchannel of WIBA-FM.

Broadcast translator for WIBA-FM HD2
Call sign	Frequency	City of license	FID	ERP (W)	HAAT	Class	Transmitter coordinates	FCC info
W265CV	100.9 FM	Madison, Wisconsin	140503	250 (Vert.)	243.1 m (798 ft)	D	43°3′21″N 89°32′6″W	LMS
