= 94.3 FM =

FM radio frequency

The following radio stations broadcast on FM frequency 94.3 MHz:

== Argentina ==
- Ángel in Puerto San Martín, Santa Fe
- LRM732 El Faro in Funes, Santa Fe
- radio disney in buenos aires
- Radio María in Libertador Gral San Martin, Jujuy
- Radio María in Villa Regina, Río Negro

== Australia ==
- Rhema FM in Dubbo, New South Wales
- Radio National in Goondiwindi, Queensland
- Radio TAB in Gladstone, Queensland
- Radio TAB in Roma, Queensland
- 3SEA in Latrobe Valley, Victoria

== Brazil ==
- ZYD563 in Porto Alegre, Rio Grande do Sul
- ZYD577 in Santa Maria, Rio Grande do Sul

== Canada (Channel 232) ==
- CBAF-FM-16 in Port au Port, Newfoundland and Labrador
- CBAL-FM-5 in Edmundston, New Brunswick
- CBHI-FM in Inverness, Nova Scotia
- CBKO-FM in Denare Beach, Saskatchewan
- CBLU-FM in Huntsville, Ontario
- CBTZ-FM in Kitwanga, British Columbia
- CFXE-FM in Edson, Alberta
- CHNW-FM in Winnipeg, Manitoba
- CHYZ-FM in Sainte-Foy, Quebec
- CIRX-FM in Prince George, British Columbia
- CISK-FM in Williams Lake, British Columbia
- CJBC-1-FM in Belleville, Ontario
- CJFH-FM in Woodstock, Ontario
- CJSD-FM in Thunder Bay, Ontario
- CKMF-FM in Montreal, Quebec
- CKSY-FM in Chatham, Ontario
- CKTT-FM in Timmins, Ontario
- VF2580 in Poplar River, Manitoba

== China ==
- CNR Business Radio in Wanzhou
- CNR Music Radio in Changchun, Hefei and Tiefengshan
- CNR The Voice of China in Tieling

== India ==
- Radio One (India), in the whole of India
- My FM (Divya Bhaskar Group), in 30 selected cities of India
- Red FM, in Muzaffarpur, Bihar
- Tomato FM Kolhapur Maharashtra(Pudhari Publication Pvt. Ltd)

== Malaysia ==
- TraXX FM in Sandakan, Sabah

== Mexico ==
- XHBTC-FM in Barroteran, Coahuila
- XHCAG-FM in Capilla de Guadalupe, Jalisco
- XHCAL-FM in Calpulalpan, Tlaxcala
- XHCJ-FM in Apatzingán, Michoacán
- XHCSAC-FM in Mapastepec, Chiapas
- XHEMG-FM in Arriaga, Chiapas
- XHGZ-FM in Zapotlán El Grande, Jalisco
- XHJTA-FM in Irapuato, Guanajuato
- XHPBLM-FM in Loma Bonita, Oaxaca
- XHPFRZ-FM in Fresnillo, Zacatecas
- XHPJON-FM in Jonuta, Tabasco
- XHPMAR-FM in Maravatío, Michoacán
- XHPVJ-FM in Puerto Vallarta, Jalisco
- XHQE-FM in Escuinapa, Sonora
- XHTFO-FM in Teotitlán de Flores Magón, Oaxaca
- XHVO-FM in San Rafael, Veracruz

== Philippines ==
- FM Radio Quezon in Quezon Province
- DWEC in Dagupan
- DWAN-FM in Puerto Princesa City
- FMR University FM in Nabua, Camarines Sur
- DWDF in Virac
- DYHT in Bacolod City
- DYIK in Tanjay, Negros Oriental
- DYDL in Carmen, Bohol
- DYPL in Ormoc, Leyte
- DXIP in Ipil, Zamboanga Sibugay
- DXNE in Tubod, Lanao del Norte
- DXWZ in Cagayan De Oro City
- DXDA-FM in Digos
- DXMH in Mati
- DXTS in General Santos City
- DXJA in Midsayap

== United Kingdom ==
- BBC Radio 4 from several locations
- BBC Radio Scotland in Central Scotland (Glasgow & Edinburgh)

== United States (Channel 232) ==
- KAMO in Rogers, Arkansas
- KATI in California, Missouri
- KAZB in Wilkerson, California
- KBPH-LP in Austin, Texas
- KBTS in Big Spring, Texas
- KBUA in San Fernando, California
- KCDR-LP in Austin, Texas
- KCMC-FM in Viola, Arkansas
- KCRE in Crescent City, California
- KCVW in Kingman, Kansas
- KDAM in Hartington, Nebraska
- KDDL in Chino Valley, Arizona
- KDEM in Deming, New Mexico
- KDLX in Makawao, Hawaii
- KDOM-FM in Windom, Minnesota
- KDUC in Barstow, California
- KEBN in Garden Grove, California
- KFST-FM in Fort Stockton, Texas
- KFYL-LP in La Grande, Oregon
- KGRB in Jackson, California
- KHER in Crystal City, Texas
- KHKU in Hanapepe, Hawaii
- KHNA-LP in Sheridan, Wyoming
- KHSH-LP in Redlands, California
- KILO in Colorado Springs, Colorado
- KJVA-LP in San Bernardino, California
- KKIN in Aitkin, Minnesota
- KMAX in Wellington, Colorado
- KMCQ-LP in Salem, Oregon
- KOKO in Kerman, California
- KOLK in Lakeside, Montana
- KPOP in Hartshorne, Oklahoma
- KRBN in Manton, California
- KRKZ-FM in Chinook, Washington
- KRRC-LP in Rogue River, Oregon
- KRVL in Kerrville, Texas
- KSAE-LP in Kennewick, Washington
- KSCM in Scammon Bay, Alaska
- KSEY-FM in Seymour, Texas
- KSHD-LP in Shady Cove, Oregon
- KSNA in Rexburg, Idaho
- KTPZ in Hazelton, Idaho
- KTWI-LP in Liberal, Kansas
- KULO in Alexandria, Minnesota
- KVGR in Kiana, Alaska
- KWDD in Fairbanks, Alaska
- KWVH-LP in Wimberley, Texas
- KXKQ in Safford, Arizona
- KXOO in Elk City, Oklahoma
- KXRQ in Roosevelt, Utah
- KXTM in Benavides, Texas
- KXVI-LP in Winfield, Texas
- KXYS-LP in Marysville, California
- KYEE in Alamogordo, New Mexico
- KYKM in Yoakum, Texas
- KYOX in Comanche, Texas
- KYXX in Ozona, Texas
- KZWL in Bullard, Texas
- KZZC-LP in Hope, Arkansas
- KZZR in Tillamook, Oregon
- WAWE in Glendale Heights, Illinois
- WBAD in Leland, Mississippi
- WBTN in Bennington, Vermont
- WBXQ in Patton, Pennsylvania
- WCIH in Elmira, New York
- WCMG in Latta, South Carolina
- WCMV-FM in Leland, Michigan
- WCYY in Biddeford, Maine
- WERW in Monroe, Michigan
- WETH in Harrisonburg, Louisiana
- WGMX in Marathon, Florida
- WGZZ in Waverly, Alabama
- WIFE-FM in Rushville, Indiana
- WIFX in Jenkins, Kentucky
- WIBG in Avalon, New Jersey
- WIJS-LP in Somerset, Kentucky
- WINX in Cambridge, Maryland
- WIWU-LP in Marion, Indiana
- WIZB in Abbeville, Alabama
- WJJM-FM in Lewisburg, Tennessee
- WJLK in Asbury Park, New Jersey
- WJTT in Red Bank, Tennessee
- WKKI in Celina, Ohio
- WKKJ in Chillicothe, Ohio
- WKUF-LP in Flint, Michigan
- WKXP in Kingston, New York
- WKYX in Golconda, Illinois
- WKZW in Sandersville, Mississippi
- WLEL in Ellaville, Georgia
- WLLT in Polo, Illinois
- WLRF-LP in Binghamton, New York
- WLZV in Buckland, Virginia
- WMKR in Pana, Illinois
- WMRN in Marion, Ohio
- WNFB in Lake City, Florida
- WNFZ in Powell, Tennessee
- WOWD-LP in Takoma Park, Maryland
- WPMJ in Chillicothe, Illinois
- WQCM in Greencastle, Pennsylvania
- WQPC in Prairie du Chien, Wisconsin
- WQPJ-LP in Port Jervis, New York
- WQPN-LP in Miami, Florida
- WQZX in Greenville, Alabama
- WREB in Greencastle, Indiana
- WRHD in Farmville, North Carolina
- WRLF in Fairmont, West Virginia
- WRLX in Riviera Beach, Florida
- WRMS-FM in Beardstown, Illinois
- WRND in Oak Grove, Kentucky
- WRQI in Saegertown, Pennsylvania
- WSCC in Goose Creek, South Carolina
- WTHP in Gibson, Georgia
- WTIX in Galliano, Louisiana
- WTJF-FM in Dyer, Tennessee
- WTON in Staunton, Virginia
- WTRW in Carbondale, Pennsylvania
- WUDE in Forest Acres, South Carolina
- WULF in Hardinsburg, Kentucky
- WVRH in Norlina, North Carolina
- WWSK in Smithtown, New York
- WXMR-LP in Marengo, Illinois
- WXRZ in Corinth, Mississippi
- WYBC in New Haven, Connecticut
- WYDR in Neenah-Menasha, Wisconsin
- WYRX in Plymouth, Indiana
- WZAI in Brewster, Massachusetts
- WZKB in Wallace, North Carolina
- WZNL in Norway, Michigan
