= Super Bowl XLV =

2011 National Football League championship game

| Pittsburgh Steelers (2) (AFC) (12–4) | Green Bay Packers (6) (NFC) (10–6) |
|---|---|
| 25 | 31 |
| Head coach: Mike Tomlin | Head coach: Mike McCarthy |
| | 1 | 2 | 3 | 4 | Total |
|---|---|---|---|---|---|
| PIT | 0 | 10 | 7 | 8 | 25 |
| GB | 14 | 7 | 0 | 10 | 31 |
- Date: February 6, 2011
- Kickoff time: 5:25 p.m. CST (UTC-6)
- Stadium: Cowboys Stadium; Arlington, Texas
- MVP: Aaron Rodgers, quarterback
- Favorite: Packers by 3
- Referee: Walt Anderson
- Attendance: 103,219

Ceremonies
- National anthem: Christina Aguilera
- Coin toss: Deion Sanders, representing the 2011 Pro Football Hall of Fame class
- Halftime show: The Black Eyed Peas, Usher, and Slash

TV in the United States
- Network: Fox
- Announcers: Joe Buck, Troy Aikman, Pam Oliver, Chris Myers, and Mike Pereira
- Nielsen ratings: 46.0 (national); 59.7 (Pittsburgh); 59.7 (Milwaukee); US viewership: 111 million est. avg., 162.9 million est. total
- Market share: 69 (national); 87 (Pittsburgh); 85 (Milwaukee)
- Cost of 30-second commercial: $3 million

Radio in the United States
- Network: Westwood One
- Announcers: Kevin Harlan (play-by-play); Boomer Esiason (analyst); James Lofton and Mark Malone (sideline reporters)

Super Bowl XLV was an American football game between the American Football Conference (AFC) champion Pittsburgh Steelers and the National Football Conference (NFC) champion Green Bay Packers to decide the National Football League (NFL) champion for the 2010 season. The Packers defeated the Steelers 31–25, winning their fourth Super Bowl and an NFL-record thirteenth league championship. It was their first since Super Bowl XXXI in 1997. The game was played on February 6, 2011, at Cowboys Stadium (now AT&T Stadium) in Arlington, Texas, the first and as of 2026, only time the Super Bowl was played in the Dallas–Fort Worth area.

Unlike most other Super Bowls, this game featured two title-abundant franchises: coming into the game, the Packers held the most NFL championships with 12 (nine league championships prior to the Super Bowl era and three Super Bowl championships), while the Steelers held the most Super Bowl championships with six. The Packers entered their fifth Super Bowl in team history, and became the first 6-seed team in the NFC to compete in the Super Bowl, after posting a 10–6 regular season record. The Steelers finished the regular season with a 12–4 record, and advanced to an, at the time, league record-tying 8th Super Bowl appearance.

Super Bowl XLV was initially dominated by the Packers, jumping to a 21–3 lead before the Steelers cut it to 21–10 just before halftime. Then after the teams exchanged touchdowns, the Steelers cut their deficit to 28–25 midway through the fourth quarter with wide receiver Mike Wallace's 25-yard touchdown reception from quarterback Ben Roethlisberger and a two-point conversion. The Packers answered with Mason Crosby's 23-yard field goal with 2:07 remaining, and then prevented the Steelers from scoring on their final drive of the game. Packers quarterback Aaron Rodgers was named Super Bowl MVP, completing 24 of 39 passes for 304 yards, three touchdowns, and no interceptions.

The broadcast of Super Bowl XLV on Fox averaged about 111 million viewers, breaking the record for the most-watched program in American television history. The game's attendance was 103,219, just short of the Super Bowl record 103,985 set in Super Bowl XIV at the Rose Bowl in Pasadena, California. The Super Bowl XLV halftime show featured the American hip hop group the Black Eyed Peas, with additional performances by Usher and Slash.

This is the last time either team has advanced to the Super Bowl, despite appearing in a combined five conference championships since then.

== Background ==
=== Host selection process ===
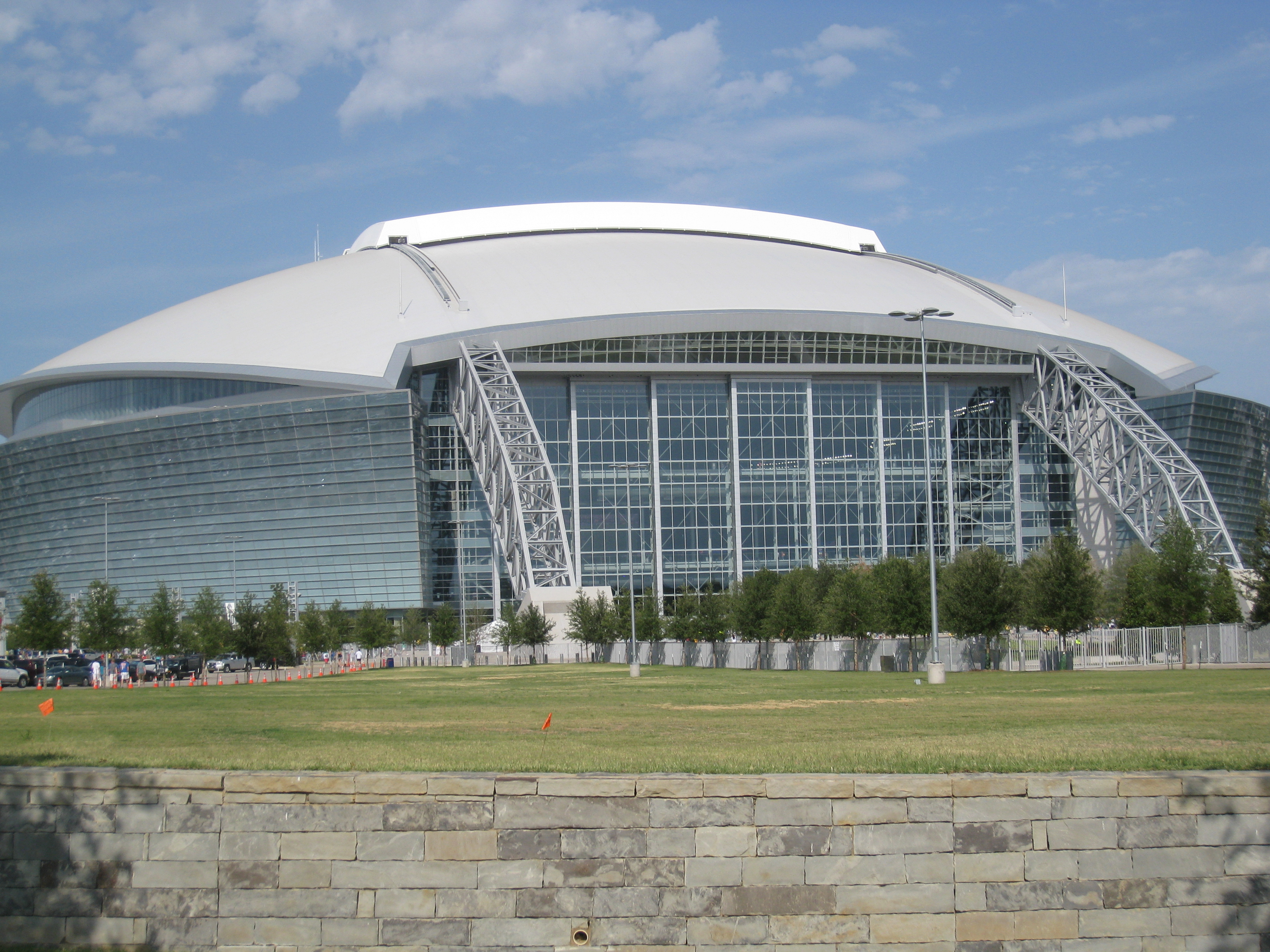
Cowboys Stadium in Arlington, Texas was selected as the site for Super Bowl XLV.

NFL owners voted to award Super Bowl XLV to Cowboys Stadium in Arlington, Texas (part of the Dallas–Fort Worth metroplex) during their May 22, 2007 meeting in Nashville. Three cities submitted bids: North Texas (Cowboys Stadium), Indianapolis (Lucas Oil Stadium) and Glendale, Arizona (University of Phoenix Stadium). Of the three finalists, the Phoenix area was the only one which had previously hosted a Super Bowl. Both Lucas Oil Stadium and Cowboys Stadium were under construction at the time of the vote. The new home of the Colts was scheduled to open in 2008, and the new home of the Cowboys was scheduled to open in 2009. All three candidate stadiums had retractable roofs, but only one (Arizona) was located in a traditionally "warm" weather climate. It was the first time since the balloting for XXVI (the selection of which took place in May 1989) that a Super Bowl host site facing a competitive vote had zero bids from either California or Florida. A fourth bid by New Orleans never materialized.

Glendale was already scheduled to host XLII (which had not yet occurred), which many felt diminished their chances to win this time around. Arizona was a decided underdog, but chose to bid regardless, predicting that it would position themselves favorably for future consideration. Both Indianapolis and the Dallas–Fort Worth area had bid on previous Super Bowls with older stadiums, but neither had been successful. Indianapolis (Hoosier Dome) lost out on XXVI, while Dallas (Cotton Bowl) had a lengthy history of failure, with no less than twelve failed bids and/or efforts that failed to materialize. The selection of either Indianapolis or Arlington represented a fresh market for the game, and a reward to the franchises and the respective areas for constructing new stadiums.

The chairman of the North Texas host committee was former Cowboys quarterback Roger Staubach, a hall of famer and Super Bowl VI MVP. The North Texas contingent touted stadium size, potential revenue, and stressed that due to convention schedules, XLV would be better for them logistically than XLVI. The Indianapolis host committee was co-chaired by Colts owner Jim Irsay, mayor Bart Peterson, governor Mitch Daniels, and Indianapolis Motor Speedway CEO Tony George. Irsay pledged $1 million towards the bid, which touted the new stadium, suitable venues around town, and a history of hosting large events such as the Final Four and the Indianapolis 500.

Bid were due on April 2, and the vote was scheduled for late May. Prior to the vote, the NFL issued a new memorandum which banned elected officials from attending the pitch meetings in person. As a result, Peterson and Daniels (both co-chairs of the Indianapolis committee), were not allowed to attend. The presentation by Indianapolis included a Top Ten list by David Letterman, and remarks by Tony Dungy. Dallas countered by telling the rich history of football in the state of Texas, and placed emphasis on stadium capacity, which they suggested might break the Super Bowl attendance record. The vote was arranged for a maximum of four rounds. A city receiving 3/4 of the votes during any round would win outright. If no city received the necessary votes during the first round, the vote would be repeated. If no city won during the second round, the third place vote-getter would be eliminated. If the fourth round was reached, the vote would change to a simple majority. Arizona was eliminated on the second ballot. Neither North Texas nor Indianapolis received enough votes in the second or third rounds, so the fourth round was decided by simple majority. Dallas won the vote, by a reported razor-thin 17–15 margin. A dejected Indianapolis contingent would eventually land XLVI.

=== Teams ===
==== Pittsburgh Steelers ====
The Pittsburgh Steelers finished the 2010 season with a 12–4 record. They earned the AFC North division title, and the second seed in the AFC and advanced to their 8th Super Bowl, tying the Dallas Cowboys' record of most Super Bowl appearances.

After missing the first four games of the year on suspension for violating the NFL's personal conduct policy (during which the Steelers went 3–1), quarterback Ben Roethlisberger returned for his seventh season as the Steelers starting quarterback, finishing the season with 3,200 yards and 17 touchdowns, with just five interceptions, for a 97 passer rating. He also rushed for 176 yards and two touchdowns. The team's top receiver was Mike Wallace who caught 60 passes for 1,257 yards and 10 touchdowns, giving him a 21 yards per catch average. Other reliable options included 13-year veteran Hines Ward (59 receptions for 755 yards and 5 touchdowns), the Steelers all-time leading receiver, and tight end Heath Miller who caught 42 passes for 512 yards. Halfback Rashard Mendenhall was the team's leading rusher, gaining 1,273 yards and 13 touchdowns while also catching 23 passes. The line was led by rookie center Maurkice Pouncey, the Steelers only Pro Bowl selection on offense. However, Pouncey was injured in the AFC championship game and would be inactive for Super Bowl XLV.

The Steelers had one of the league's top defenses, leading the NFL in sacks (48), and fewest points (14.5) and rushing yards (62.8) allowed per game, while ranking second in fewest total yards (276.8). The line was anchored by Pro Bowl end Brett Keisel. The Steelers also had four excellent linebackers: LaMarr Woodley, James Harrison, James Farrior, and Lawrence Timmons. For the third consecutive year, Woodley and Harrison each recorded at least 10 sacks. Woodley also forced three fumbles and Harrison forced six. Farrior had 109 total tackles and six sacks. Timmons led the team with 135 total tackles, while also recording three sacks and two interceptions. The secondary was led by Pro Bowl safety Troy Polamalu, who won the NFL Defensive Player of the Year Award, tying his career-best seven interceptions and returning them for 101 yards and a touchdown.

Coach Mike Tomlin, already the youngest coach to ever win a Super Bowl, became the youngest coach ever to make it to the Super Bowl twice at age 38. The Steelers also continued their streak of reaching the Super Bowl in five different decades, and in every decade since the post AFL-NFL merger (1970s: 1975, 1976, and 1979; 1980s: 1980; 1990s: 1996; 2000s: 2006 and 2009; 2010s: 2011).

==== Green Bay Packers ====
The Green Bay Packers finished the season with a 10–6 record and became the first sixth-seeded team in the NFC to compete in the Super Bowl. They are only the second sixth-seeded team to reach the Super Bowl, with the only other number 6 seed to accomplish this feat, coincidentally, being the Pittsburgh Steelers, who won Super Bowl XL following the 2005 season. Green Bay also joined the 2005 Steelers as the only teams ever to defeat the top three seeded teams on the road in the playoffs. In order to secure their fifth Super Bowl bid they defeated their longtime rivals, the Chicago Bears, in the NFC Championship Game at Soldier Field.

The offense was led by quarterback Aaron Rodgers, who was in his third year as a starter after taking over for the team's all-time leading passer Brett Favre. Rodgers finished the season completing 65.7% of his passes for 3,922 yards and 28 touchdowns, with only eleven interceptions, giving him his second consecutive season with a triple digit passer rating (101.2). He was also a good rusher, adding 356 yards and 4 touchdowns on the ground. His top target was Pro Bowl receiver Greg Jennings, who caught 76 passes for 1,265 yards and 12 touchdowns, giving him a 16.6 yards per catch average while also ranking him fourth in the NFL in yards and second in touchdown catches. Other reliable targets included receivers James Jones (50 receptions, 676 yards, 5 touchdowns), Donald Driver (51 receptions, 565 yards, 4 touchdowns), and Jordy Nelson (45 receptions, 582 yards, 496 kick return yards). The Packers lost star tight end Jermichael Finley (21 receptions 301 yards, 1 touchdown) to injury in week five who was their leading receiver at the time. The Packers ground game was crippled by injuries, especially the Week 1 loss of Ryan Grant, who had rushed for over 1,200 yards in each of the last two seasons. In his absence, the team relied prominently on Brandon Jackson, who rushed for 703 yards and caught 43 passes for 342, and fullback John Kuhn, who added 281 yards on the ground. The team's offensive line was anchored by pro bowl tackle Chad Clifton, an 11-year veteran.

The Packers defense ranked second in the league in fewest points allowed per game (15). The line was led by Cullen Jenkins, who recorded seven sacks in just eleven games, and 338-pound defensive tackle B. J. Raji, who had 6.5. The linebackers were led by Pro Bowler Clay Matthews and A. J. Hawk. Matthews ranked fourth in the NFL with 13.5 sacks, while Hawk led the team in combined tackles (111) and intercepted three passes. Three of the Packers starters in the secondary also made the Pro Bowl. Tramon Williams led the team with a career-high 6 interceptions, while adding 326 punt return yards. Other Pro Bowl selections included safety Nick Collins (4 interceptions and 70 combined tackles) and hard hitting 13-year veteran cornerback Charles Woodson, who recorded 92 total tackles and forced five fumbles, while also intercepting two passes.

The Packers entered the Super Bowl never having trailed by more than 7 points at any point during the season—a feat that had never been accomplished during a complete season in the Super Bowl era. The last team to complete a season with this distinction was the Detroit Lions in 1962. In the Super Bowl game itself, the Packers never trailed.

Of note, this was Green Bay's first Super Bowl against an AFC team that was not one of the "Original 8" American Football League franchises. The Packers had played Kansas City, Oakland, New England, and Denver in their four previous Super Bowl match-ups, defeating the Chiefs, Raiders and Patriots, and losing to the Broncos. The Steelers, like the Packers, predated the AFL's launch, having begun play in 1933 (12 years after the Packers joined the NFL after two years as an independent team), and moved to the AFC in 1970 as a result of the AFL–NFL merger to even out the two conferences.

=== Playoffs ===
The Steelers advanced to the Super Bowl with two close wins in the playoffs. After a first-round bye, the Steelers defeated their division rival, the number 5 seeded Baltimore Ravens 31–24, with Ben Roethlisberger's 58-yard completion to Antonio Brown on third down and 19 setting up Rashard Mendenhall's game winning 2-yard touchdown run with 1:33 left in the game. Roethlisberger finished with 226 passing yards and two touchdowns, while the defense forced three turnovers and sacked Ravens quarterback Joe Flacco five times, three by James Harrison.

Then the Steelers defeated the number 6 seeded New York Jets 24–19 in the AFC Championship Game. The Steelers seemed to be in complete control at first, taking a 24–0 lead in the first half. Jets quarterback Mark Sanchez rallied his team back, cutting the score to 24–10 going into the fourth quarter. The Jets then drove to the Steelers 2-yard line on a 17-play drive, but the Steelers defense made a key stand, keeping them out of the end zone on four consecutive plays near the goal-line to force a turnover. The Jets subsequently forced a safety and scored a touchdown with just over three minutes left, but Roethlisberger's 14-yard completions to Brown and Heath Miller allowed the Steelers to hang onto the ball until time expired. Mendenhall finished with 121 rushing yards and a touchdown, along with 2 catches for 32 yards.

The Packers started off their postseason with a 21–16 win over the number 3 seeded Philadelphia Eagles after Tramon Williams intercepted a pass from Michael Vick in the end zone with less than a minute left to play. Aaron Rodgers threw for 180 yards and three touchdowns while James Starks, who only rushed for 101 yards during the season, rushed for 123 yards in the game.

The Packers then went to Atlanta, where the top-seeded 13–3 Atlanta Falcons were waiting. Although the Falcons took advantage of an early turnover and a kick return touchdown to build a 14–7 lead, the Packers quickly buried the Falcons with 35 straight points. By the end of the first half, the Packers held a 28–14 lead, and went on to win comfortably, 48–21. Rodgers was nearly perfect, completing 31 of 36 passes for 366 yards and three touchdowns, while adding another score on the ground. Jordy Nelson and James Jones both had touchdown catches, while John Kuhn added scores by air and ground and Tramon Williams returned one of his two interceptions 70 yards for a touchdown. The Packers' special teams unit never had to punt the ball, while Mason Crosby contributed two field goals.

The Packers next faced their rival, the number 2 Chicago Bears in the NFC Championship Game, defeating them 21–14. This time Rodgers had a rougher day than his previous two games, throwing no touchdown passes and being intercepted twice. But he still threw for 244 yards and scored a 1-yard touchdown run, while Starks added 74 rushing yards, including a touchdown run in the second quarter. Meanwhile, the Packers' defense knocked Bears quarterback Jay Cutler out of the game and intercepted three passes, one of which was returned 18 yards for a touchdown by B. J. Raji. The other two were made by rookie Sam Shields, who recorded his second interception near his own end zone with 37 seconds left to put the game away.

=== Super Bowl pregame notes ===
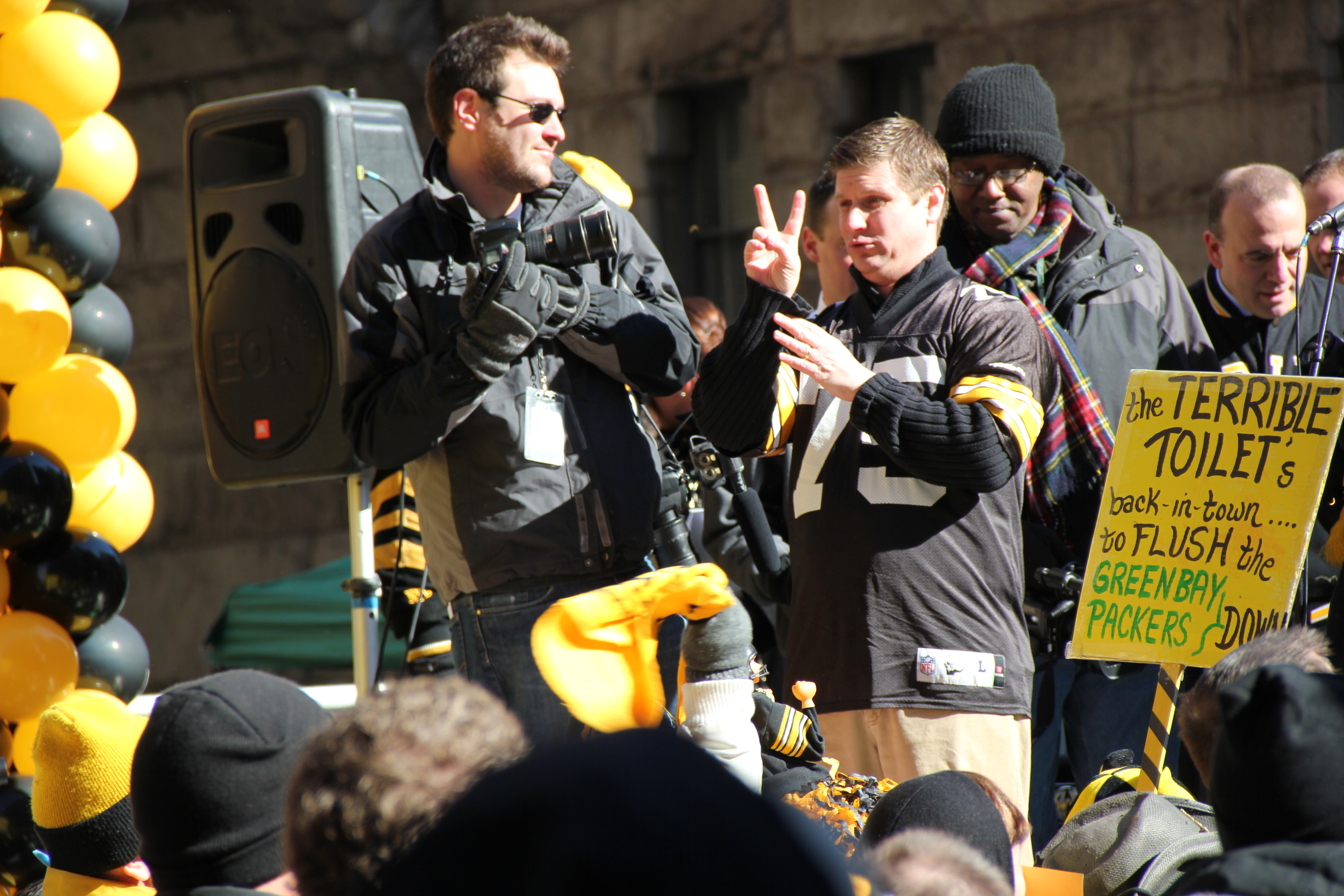
An American Sign Language interpreter in the Joe Greene jersey appearing at a rally for the Pittsburgh Steelers prior to Super Bowl XLV.

Both teams are known to have sizable fanbases that often travel to away games, largely due to season tickets for home games having decades-long waiting lists. In August 2008, ESPN.com ranked the two teams tied as having the best fans in the NFL. ESPN's own John Clayton, a Pittsburgh native, broke the tie in favor of the Steelers.

As the Packers were the designated home team in the annual rotation between AFC and NFC teams, the team elected to wear their green jerseys. Although both teams are known to wear their colored jerseys at home and have rarely worn white at home, the Packers decision contrasted with the Steelers decision as the home team in Super Bowl XL to wear white jerseys. Both the 2005 Steelers and 2010 Packers were number 6 seeded teams when they reached the Super Bowl, forcing them to play all of their postseason games on the road and wearing their respective white jerseys in those games.

The retractable roof at Cowboys Stadium was closed for the game.

A severe winter storm blanketed the Dallas–Fort Worth area in hard ice and snow the week before the game, threatening to disrupt game preparations. Snow fell from the roof of Cowboys Stadium's East end on February 4, injuring six people. Over 3,000 tickets were sold to watch the game in the stadium's East Plaza, which experienced the falling ice tragedy earlier in the week. However, the snow had melted by game time and fans who paid $200 per ticket were allowed to watch the game outside Cowboys Stadium, in the open air, as the weather turned from sleet to sun.

Since the Steelers and Packers were two of the six teams that did not have cheerleaders during the 2010 NFL season (the others being the Chicago Bears, Detroit Lions, Cleveland Browns, and New York Giants), this marked the first Super Bowl without cheerleaders.

Packers lineman, Bryan Bulaga, became the youngest player to start in a Super Bowl, at the age of 21 years and 322 days old. Steelers center Maurkice Pouncey would have been the youngest player (21 years, 197 days), but he could not play because of a high ankle sprain.

==== Possible presidential appearance ====
During a press conference on January 19, 2011, President Barack Obama (a longtime Chicago Bears fan) said he would attend Super Bowl XLV if Chicago defeated Green Bay, saying "If Chicago wins, I'm going no doubt". Chicago ended up losing the NFC Championship game a few days later on January 23 to Green Bay 21–14. In a post-game locker-room speech, Green Bay Packers corner Charles Woodson poked fun at the President's comment saying "The President don't want to come watch us at the Super Bowl, guess what? We'll go see him" (implying that Green Bay would win the Super Bowl and visit the White House as the winning team usually does each year; a statement that would come true). Woodson then broke the Packers meeting with a team cheer of "White House!". On January 26 President Obama visited Green Bay and was greeted by Mayor Jim Schmitt and Wisconsin Governor Scott Walker who presented the President with two Green Bay Packers Jerseys. The first had Obama's name on the back with the number 1 and the second was an autographed Charles Woodson jersey with the message "See you at the White House. Go Packers!" written on the back by Woodson.

On August 12, 2011, Woodson's promise came true and the Packers visited the White House and met with President Obama. Their visit was delayed because of the NFL lockout and took place a day before the Packers first preseason game against the Cleveland Browns. President Obama was presented with a Packers jersey with the number 1 and the words Commander-In-Chief on the back. He was also presented with a stock share of the Packers organization, thus making him a part owner of the Packers. When Obama jokingly asked if this meant he could trade Aaron Rodgers to the Bears, Woodson responded that Obama was just "a minority owner".

Obama, who is also a Steelers fan and considers the team to be his second-favorite after the Bears, openly supported the Steelers two years earlier in Super Bowl XLIII after the Rooney family helped with his campaigning work and later appointed Steelers chairman Dan Rooney, an ethnic Irish Catholic, the U.S. Ambassador to Ireland. He did not attend the game; instead, he hosted a 100-person Super Bowl party at the White House. Attendees included his family, elected leaders from Pennsylvania and Wisconsin, DNC member Andres Lopez of Puerto Rico, Buffalo, New York mayor Byron Brown, Buffalo deputy mayor Steve Casey, Newark, New Jersey mayor Cory Booker, Jennifer Lopez and her husband Marc Anthony, both actors/singers, ESPN columnist Michael Wilbon, and Tony Kornheiser.

Although the sitting president did not attend the game, former president and former Texas governor George W. Bush was present, along with his wife Laura and former Secretary of State Condoleezza Rice.

==== Local commemoration ====
From June 15, 2010, through February 6, 2011, the 30-mile section of Interstate 30 between Dallas and Fort Worth along which Cowboys Stadium is situated had been temporarily designated as the "Tom Landry Super Bowl Highway" in commemoration of Super Bowl XLV. The former Dallas–Fort Worth Turnpike is normally known as the "Tom Landry Highway" in honor of former Dallas Cowboys coach Tom Landry.

==== Logo ====
While past Super Bowl games used their own unique logo designs that changed yearly and featured imagery which reflected the host city, Super Bowl XLV introduced a new standardized, silver-colored emblem, featuring an image of the Vince Lombardi Trophy sitting atop the traditional Roman numerals used to denote each edition, with a stylized image of the host stadium shown in the background. It was introduced as part of a new, standardized branding scheme for the NFL's postseason games, which also saw the redesign of the conference championship trophies.

The only changes made to the logo for future games, until Super Bowl 50, was to change the number and the stadium depicted. Super Bowl 50 deviated slightly from the standard design to emphasize the game's "golden anniversary", featuring the number "50" in large gold numbering on each side of the trophy rather than below it in Roman numerals. This modified layout, but with Roman numerals, no stadium, and different accent colors, has been used for subsequent Super Bowl games. Super Bowl LVI in 2022 later established a compromise, in which scenery or other designs reflective of the host city would appear within the numerals.

== Broadcasting ==
=== Television ===
==== United States ====
Fox televised the game in the United States, with Joe Buck as the play-by-play announcer and Troy Aikman, himself a three-time Super Bowl winner as a Dallas Cowboys quarterback, as the color analyst. Mike Pereira joined Buck and Aikman in the broadcast booth to comment on instant replay reviews, while Pam Oliver and Chris Myers served as sideline reporters. The pre-game show featured the Fox NFL Sunday crew of host Curt Menefee and a group of analysts with extensive Super Bowl experiences of their own: Terry Bradshaw (4 time Super Bowl-winning quarterback with the Pittsburgh Steelers), Howie Long (one-time Super Bowl winning defensive end with the then-Los Angeles Raiders), Michael Strahan (one-time Super Bowl winning defensive end with the New York Giants) and Jimmy Johnson (two-time Super Bowl winning head coach with the Dallas Cowboys). They were joined by a variety of other commentators.

Five days prior to the game, Immigration and Customs Enforcement, along with the United States Attorney for the Southern District of New York, seized and shut down several websites that had provided access to pirated Internet television feeds of NFL games.

With an average US audience of 111 million viewers, this was the most-watched Super Bowl as well as the most-watched program of any kind in American television history, beating the previous record of 106.5 million viewers for Super Bowl XLIV. However, Super Bowl XVI still holds the record for the highest rated Super Bowl in history with a 49.1 national rating and a 73 share. An estimated 162.9 million total viewers watched all or part of the game. The game drew a national household Nielsen rating of 46.0 and a 69 share. It drew a 59.7 local rating in both Milwaukee (WITI) and Pittsburgh (WPGH), the second-highest local rating for a Super Bowl after the 63.0 that Super Bowl XX drew in Chicago. In the host market of Dallas–Fort Worth (KDFW), the game drew a 53.7 rating.

Fox's lead-out program was an episode of Glee titled "The Sue Sylvester Shuffle". At the conclusion of Glee's airing, Fox became the first media network in U.S. television history to garner a single-night primetime average of at least 100 million viewers.

===== Advertising =====
By September 15, 2010, Fox had sold 90 percent of all available slots; all slots were completely sold out by October. The price of an advertisement began at US$3 million. Pepsi-Cola returned after a one-year retreat with three ads for their Pepsi Max drink, which has been named as the official soft drink of the NFL. Pepsi's Frito-Lay brand also advertised Doritos. Both brands had their advertisements created by web users as part of the annual USA Today Super Bowl Ad Meter contest, which offers a prize of US $5 million. In addition, regular purchasers Anheuser-Busch InBev, GoDaddy.com, Coca-Cola, CareerBuilder.com, and E*TRADE purchased advertisements; InBev advertised Stella Artois imported beer for the first time in the Super Bowl in addition to its usual Budweiser and Bud Light advertisements. Hyundai, Mercedes-Benz, Volkswagen and Audi also advertised, as did General Motors, who returned for the first time since their bankruptcy with advertisements for the Chevrolet Cruze, Camaro, Silverado and Volt. Chrysler purchased a 2-minute-long advertisement for its Chrysler 200 featuring Eminem.

Advertisements for 15 films were shown during the pregame show, the game itself, and the postgame.

==== International ====
NFL International provided television coverage for viewers outside of North America, with Bob Papa and Joe Theismann calling the English language feed. The game was shown live on the following channels:

- Asia: All Sports Network.
  - China: DragonTV, G-Sports, GDTV Sports, BTV Sports, CNTV 5+ (online), Sina TV (online), QQLive (online), .
- Australia: One HD & Network Ten. In addition it was also broadcast live on ESPN Australia.
- Canada: CTV in English (using the FOX feed) and RDS in French. As in past years, CTV exercised its simultaneous substitution rights over American stations carrying the game on Canadian cable and satellite providers.
- Europe: ESPN America, in addition to the following local broadcasters:
  - Austria: Puls 4.
  - Belgium: Prime Sport, BeTV.
  - Denmark: TV3+/TV3+ HD.
  - Finland: Nelonen Pro 1.
  - France: W9 (audience: 300,000, share: 8.6%).
  - Germany: ARD (audience: 970,000), Sport1+.
  - Hungary and Romania: Sport 1.
  - Iceland Stöð2Sport
  - Italy: La7, Dahlia TV.
  - Israel: Sport 5.
  - Norway: NRK (With the FOX feed and reactions from experts in studio during commercial breaks. The Bridgestone Halftime Show was also broadcast.)
  - Poland: Polsat Sport.
  - Portugal: SportTV.
  - Russia: NTV Plus.
  - Slovenia: Šport TV 1.
  - Spain: Canal+.
  - Sweden: TV10.
  - Switzerland: SSF.
  - United Kingdom and Ireland: BBC One (audience: 1.01m), BBC One HD, Sky Sports and Sky Sports HD.
- Latin America: ESPN Latin America and Fox Sports Latin America.
  - Brazil: BandSports, Band and ESPN Brasil.
  - Mexico: Azteca 7 and Canal 5.
- South Africa: ESPN.

=== Radio ===
Westwood One broadcast Super Bowl XLV across the United States and Canada, with play-by-play announcer Kevin Harlan (calling his first Super Bowl for the network) and color analyst Boomer Esiason. Univision Radio carried a Spanish language feed for its stations throughout the US. The flagship stations for each team also carried the game with their respective local announcers:

- The Packers Radio Network via WTAQ, WTAQ-FM and WIXX in Green Bay and WTMJ in Milwaukee, with Wayne Larrivee and Larry McCarren announcing.
- The Pittsburgh Steelers Radio Network via WDVE and WBGG in Pittsburgh, with Bill Hillgrove and Tunch Ilkin announcing.

In the United Kingdom, BBC Radio 5 Live carried radio coverage with Darren Fletcher and Greg Brady announcing.

Sirius XM Satellite Radio carried 14 feeds in ten languages to Sirius subscribers, as well as to XM subscribers with the "Best of Sirius" package. In addition to the Westwood One and local team broadcasts, Sirius carried the following international feeds:

- Brazil: Eldorado ESPN (Portuguese)
- China: SMG (Chinese)
- Denmark: Viasat Sport (Danish)
- France: W9 (French)
- Germany: ARD (German)
- Hungary: Chello (Hungarian)
- Japan: NHK (Japanese)
- Mexico: TV Azteca (Spanish)
- Netherlands: Prime Sport (Dutch)
- Russia: NTV Plus (Russian)
- Spain: Canal+ Spain (Spanish)
- United Kingdom: BBC Radio 5 Live (English)

FieldPass, the subscription Internet radio service provided by the league at NFL.com, also carried most of these feeds. Due to contractual restrictions, only Sirius XM and FieldPass were permitted to carry the local team broadcasts along with WTAQ, WIXX, WTMJ, WDVE and WBGG, with the teams' other network radio affiliates instead airing the Westwood One feed.

== Attendance ==
Cowboys Stadium installed 15,000 temporary seats and utilized its standing room to increase its capacity to over 105,000 fans. If the stadium had been filled to capacity (its record for an NFL game is 105,121 spectators), it would have set a record for Super Bowl attendance, breaking the previous record of 103,985 fans for Super Bowl XIV in the Rose Bowl; however the actual attendance of 103,219 fell 766 fans short. League officials had indicated that they would also count spectators watching the game on large television screens from outside the stadium in the tally, which generally is not allowed in official attendance counts. However, Super Bowl XLV was the first Super Bowl game to break the 100,000 threshold in attendance since Super Bowl XXI in 1987.

Due to numerous delays, including damage sustained from an ice storm, 1,250 temporary seats were not ready in time for the game. According to a police officer standing near the affected area, the seats had not been installed in time for the fire marshal to inspect them. The NFL scrambled almost until kickoff to find replacement seats. Eventually, 850 fans in four sections were relocated, while 400 fans in two sections were given a refund equivalent to three times the face value of their ticket. The latter set of fans were later offered the chance to watch the game on monitors in the North Field Club behind the Steelers bench, but would still get the triple refund. Some of these fans were still upset, since they had spent thousands on airfare and hotels. NFL spokesman Brian McCarthy said that when the league decided to relocate the 850 fans, it lost any shot of setting the attendance record.

The NFL subsequently offered affected fans a ticket to the next Super Bowl in addition to the refund. It also offered fans the option of a ticket to any future Super Bowl, along with round-trip airfare and hotel accommodations. However, this wasn't enough to mollify several fans, who on February 9 filed a $5 million class-action lawsuit against the NFL, the Cowboys and Jones. In addition to Steelers and Packers fans left without seats, the suit includes Cowboys fans who paid $100,000 for personal seat licenses, only to have to watch the Super Bowl in metal folding chairs without a view of the stadium's giant video replay board. The NFL at first offered $2,400 to fans who did not receive a replacement seat, but later offered tickets to a future Super Bowl with airfare and hotels included.

Not all of the fans accepted the NFL's settlement offer, so the case went to trial. The outcome of the lawsuit was a finding for the plaintiffs against the NFL in the matter of breach of contract, and not liable for fraudulent inducement. The Cowboys and Jerry Jones were dismissed as parties to the lawsuit since the plaintiffs' contracts were solely with the NFL. The plaintiffs were awarded between $5,600 and $22,000 depending on the value of their tickets.

== Entertainment and other ceremonies ==
=== Pregame ===
Keith Urban and Maroon 5 performed during the pregame. The TCU Horned Frog Marching Band also performed during the pregame show. 22-year-old Candice Villesca of Lewisville, Texas, performed the national anthem and "America the Beautiful" in American Sign Language. Lea Michele performed "America the Beautiful" supported by the Air Force Tops in Blue. Pop singer Christina Aguilera sang the national anthem but performed the wrong lyrics for the fourth line of the song, later issuing an apology. The anthem concluded with a flyover of five U.S. Navy F/A-18 Hornets from Naval Air Station Oceana in Virginia Beach, Virginia. There was some controversy about the cost (approximately $450,000) for the flight considering that the Navy also operated F/A-18s out of Naval Air Station Joint Reserve Base Fort Worth, less than 20 miles from Cowboys Stadium.

The coin toss ceremony was the first to commemorate two anniversaries—the 25th anniversary of Super Bowl XX and 15th of Super Bowl XXX, which marked the Dallas Cowboys' most recent Super Bowl championship. In honor of those occasions, Super Bowl XX MVP Richard Dent and former Dallas Cowboys defensive back Deion Sanders, both of whom were inducted into the Pro Football Hall of Fame in 2011, took part in the ceremonies. They were joined by fellow Pro Football Hall of Fame inductees and past Super Bowl participants Marshall Faulk, Chris Hanburger and Shannon Sharpe.

=== Halftime ===
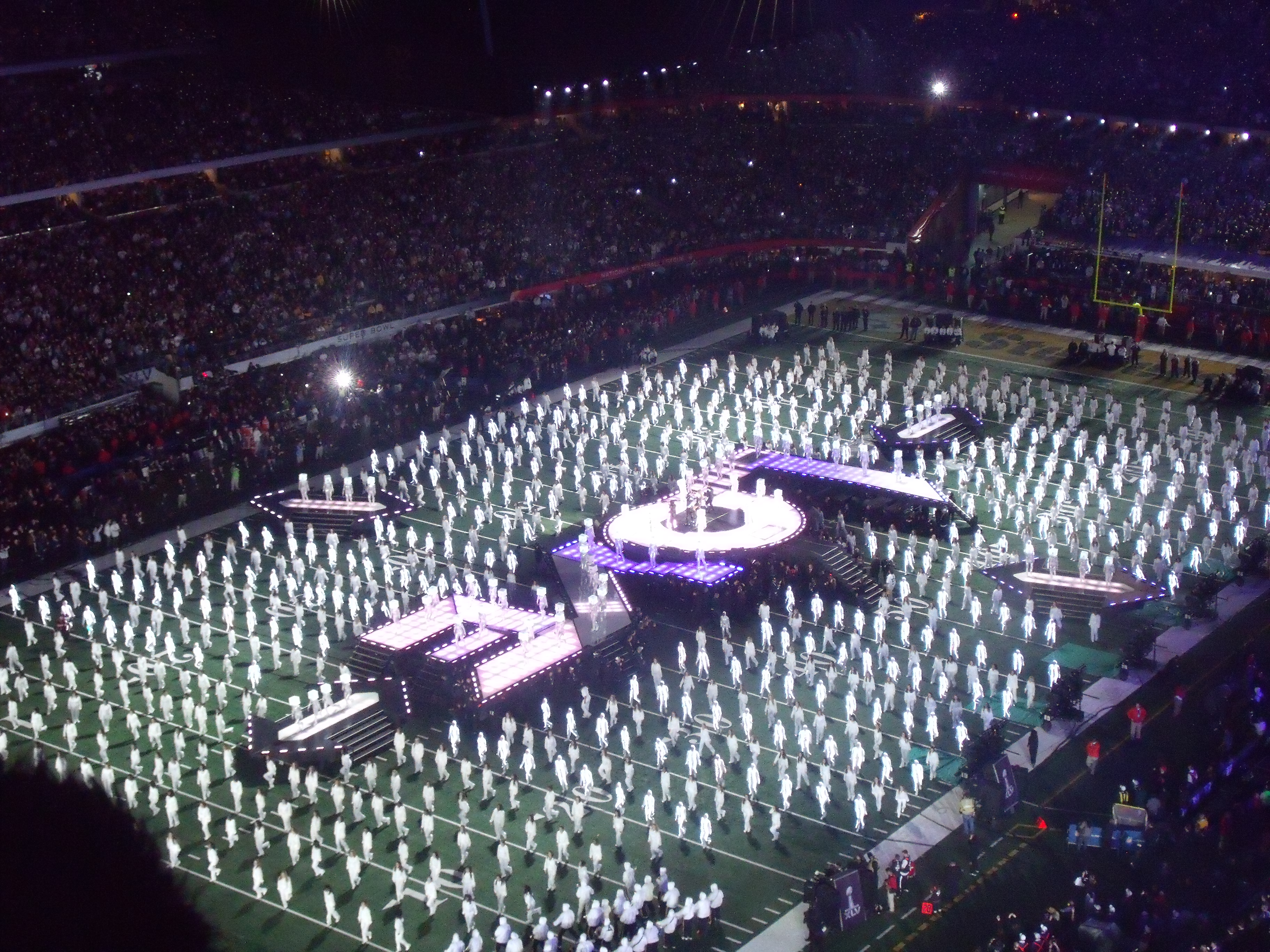
Super Bowl XLV halftime show

The Black Eyed Peas performed a medley of their greatest hits: "I Gotta Feeling", "Boom Boom Pow", "Pump It", "The Time (Dirty Bit)", "Let's Get It Started", and "Where Is the Love?" Slash made a guest appearance, performing "Sweet Child o' Mine" with Fergie, while Usher made an appearance to perform his song "OMG" with will.i.am. The show also displayed a long list of other performers, including Prairie View A&M University's "Marching Storm" Band. Country music was originally in the planning until the Black Eyed Peas agreed to perform. This halftime show was intended to bring youth back into the Super Bowl halftime show as legacy artists were book for the past halftime shows following the incident during the Super Bowl XXXVIII halftime show where Justin Timberlake exposed Janet Jackson's breast on live television. This was also the first halftime show to feature a female co-headliner in 7 years, Fergie, since Jackson.

== Game summary ==
External videos
- Full game broadcast from NFL's official channel on YouTube

=== First half ===
After the first three possessions of the game ended with punts, the Packers opened up the scoring with a nine-play, 80-yard drive, which ended with quarterback Aaron Rodgers' 29-yard touchdown pass to wide receiver Jordy Nelson, who managed to pull slightly ahead of cornerback William Gay enough to make a leaping catch and dive into the end zone. Then on the first play after the ensuing kickoff, Steelers quarterback Ben Roethlisberger was hit by nose tackle Howard Green as he threw a pass intended for wide receiver Mike Wallace, causing the ball to go well short of his intended target near the left sideline where it was intercepted and returned 37 yards for a touchdown by safety Nick Collins, immediately increasing the Packers' lead to 14–0. This score continued the unbeaten streak of Super Bowl victories recorded by teams scoring on an interception run-back, improving to 11–0 in such games. It was also the third consecutive Super Bowl with an interception return for a touchdown, as well as the eighth such score in the last ten Super Bowls. The Packers also tied the Miami Dolphins' record which still stands for the largest Super Bowl lead (14 points) at the end of the first quarter, set in Super Bowl VIII against the Minnesota Vikings and later tied by the Oakland Raiders against the Philadelphia Eagles in Super Bowl XV.

The Steelers managed to respond to the Packers' two touchdowns on their ensuing drive, driving 49 yards in 13 plays, which carried over into the second quarter. Aided by Roethlisberger's 18-yard scramble on 3rd-and-9, kicker Shaun Suisham finished the drive with a 33-yard field goal to cut their deficit to 14–3. Then after forcing a punt, the Steelers drove to midfield, but Roethlisberger threw another interception, this time to cornerback Jarrett Bush at the 47-yard line. Rodgers then led the Packers to another touchdown in just four plays, completing two passes for 20 yards before running back James Starks' 12-yard run moved the ball to the 21-yard line. On the next play, the Packers increased their lead to 21–3 with Rodgers' 21-yard touchdown pass to wide receiver Greg Jennings. Taking the ball back with 2:24 left in the half, Roethlisberger completed a 37-yard strike to wide receiver Antwaan Randle El on their first play. After that, wide receiver Hines Ward caught three passes for 39 yards on the drive, the last one for an 8-yard touchdown with 37 seconds left in the half, making the score 21–10 at halftime. This was the fourth time in their four 2011 postseason games that the Packers finished the first half with a lead of 11 points or more. The first half had taken a heavy toll on both teams. The Steelers lost wide receiver Emmanuel Sanders to injury, while the Packers lost wide receiver Donald Driver, along with cornerbacks Charles Woodson and Sam Shields. Shields would be the only player among them who would return.

=== Second half ===
The Steelers' defense forced the Packers to punt on the first drive of the second half, and got the ball at midfield with the help of a face-mask penalty on Packers tight end Tom Crabtree while tackling wide receiver Antonio Brown on the punt return. The offense then recorded five consecutive runs to score. First, running back Rashard Mendenhall broke free along with right sideline for a 17-yard run, then running back Isaac Redman rushed for 3 yards, and Roethlisberger ran for 6, bringing up 3rd-and-1. On the next play, Redman tried to run up the middle, but was held up at the line, so he backed away and ran to the outside for a 16-yard gain to the 8-yard line. Then Mendenhall scored an 8-yard touchdown run on the next play, cutting the Steelers' deficit to 21–17. After forcing a punt, the Steelers mounted a drive to the Packers' 29-yard line, but the Packers' defense made a stand. First Roethlisberger's pass was batted down behind the line by linebacker Clay Matthews, then Roethlisberger tried a screen pass to tight end Heath Miller, but linebacker Desmond Bishop tackled him for a 3-yard loss. Then on third down, linebacker Frank Zombo sacked Roethlisberger for a 2-yard loss on the 34-yard line, and Suisham's ensuing 52-yard field goal attempt sailed wide left.

After the next three possessions resulted in punts, on the first play of the fourth quarter, the Steelers turned the ball over for the third time when Mendenhall fumbled the ball while being tackled behind the line by Matthews and defensive end Ryan Pickett. Bishop recovered the ball and returned it 7 yards to his own 45-yard line. The turnover led to yet another Packers score. Six plays later on 3rd-and-10, Rodgers completed a 38-yard pass to Nelson at the Steelers' 2-yard line. Linebacker LaMarr Woodley sacked Rodgers for a 6-yard loss on the next play, but then Rodgers threw an 8-yard touchdown pass to Jennings, increasing the Packers' lead to 28–17. Roethlisberger led the Steelers right back with 6 of 7 completions. After a 9-yard pass to tight end Matt Spaeth, he threw three completions to Wallace for 27 yards to reach the Packers' 40-yard line. Then after a 15-yard completion to Ward, Roethlisberger finished the drive with a 25-yard touchdown pass to Wallace. On the two-point conversion play, Roethlisberger faked a hand-off to Mendenhall and ran up to the line before pitching the ball to Randle El, who eluded a tackle by Shields and scored on an outside sweep, cutting the Steelers' deficit to a field goal at 28–25.

The Packers took the ball back with just over 7 minutes left, and found themselves facing 3rd-and-10 after two plays, but Rodgers kept the drive going with a 31-yard completion to Jennings over the middle. Starks then ran 14 yards to the Steelers' 30-yard line. Two plays later, wide receiver James Jones caught a 21-yard pass at the 8-yard line. The Steelers' defense kept the Packers out of the end zone, forcing the Packers to settle for a 23-yard field goal by Mason Crosby that gave Green Bay a 31–25 lead with 2:07 left in the game.

The Steelers got the ball back on their own 13-yard line with the opportunity to start a game-winning drive. On their first play, Roethlisberger completed a 15-yard pass to Miller. But after a 5-yard reception by Ward, the next three passes were incomplete, turning the ball over on downs and allowing Rodgers to take two knees and end the game in favor of the Packers. In a nod to the Packers' defensive dominance, the Steelers did not take the lead at any time in the entire game.

=== Box score ===
Super Bowl XLV: Green Bay Packers 31, Pittsburgh Steelers 25

| Quarter | 1 | 2 | 3 | 4 | Total |
|---|---|---|---|---|---|
| Steelers (AFC) | 0 | 10 | 7 | 8 | 25 |
| Packers (NFC) | 14 | 7 | 0 | 10 | 31 |

at Cowboys Stadium, Arlington, Texas

- Date: February 6, 2011
- Game time: 5:34 p.m. CST
- Game weather: Played indoors, retractable roof closed
- Game attendance: 103,219
- Referee: Walt Anderson (66)
- TV announcers (Fox): Joe Buck, Troy Aikman, Pam Oliver, Chris Myers
- Recap, Game book

Scoring summary

| Quarter | Time | Drive | | | Team | Scoring information | Score | |
| Quarter | Time | Plays | Yards | TOP | Team | Scoring information | PIT | GB |
|---|---|---|---|---|---|---|---|---|
| 1 | 3:44 | 9 | 80 | 4:33 | GB | Jordy Nelson 29-yard touchdown reception from Aaron Rodgers, Mason Crosby kick good | 0 | 7 |
| 1 | 3:20 | — | — | — | GB | Interception returned 37 yards for touchdown by Nick Collins, Crosby kick good | 0 | 14 |
| 2 | 11:08 | 13 | 49 | 7:12 | PIT | 33-yard field goal by Shaun Suisham | 3 | 14 |
| 2 | 2:24 | 4 | 53 | 2:04 | GB | Greg Jennings 21-yard touchdown reception from Rodgers, Crosby kick good | 3 | 21 |
| 2 | 0:39 | 7 | 77 | 1:45 | PIT | Hines Ward 8-yard touchdown reception from Ben Roethlisberger, Suisham kick good | 10 | 21 |
| 3 | 10:19 | 5 | 50 | 2:20 | PIT | Rashard Mendenhall 8-yard touchdown run, Suisham kick good | 17 | 21 |
| 4 | 11:57 | 8 | 55 | 2:53 | GB | Jennings 8-yard touchdown reception from Rodgers, Crosby kick good | 17 | 28 |
| 4 | 7:34 | 7 | 66 | 4:23 | PIT | Mike Wallace 25-yard touchdown reception from Roethlisberger, 2-point run good (Antwaan Randle El) | 25 | 28 |
| 4 | 2:07 | 10 | 70 | 5:27 | GB | 23-yard field goal by Crosby | 25 | 31 |
| "TOP" = time of possession. For other American football terms, see Glossary of American football. | | | | | | | 25 | 31 |

=== Statistical overview ===
The Packers joined the New York Giants as the only teams to win Super Bowls in 3 different decades (1966, 1967, 1996, and 2010).

Nelson was the top receiver of the game with 9 receptions for 140 yards (both career highs) and a touchdown, while also gaining 19 more yards on a kick return, all despite 3 dropped passes. Jennings added 64 yards and 2 touchdowns. Roethlisberger completed 25 of 40 passes for 263 yards and two touchdowns, with 2 interceptions, and ran for 31 yards. His top target was Wallace, who caught 9 passes for 89 yards and a score. Mendenhall was the top rusher of the game with 64 yards and a touchdown.

== Final statistics ==
Sources: NFL.com Super Bowl XLV, Super Bowl XLV Play Finder GB, Super Bowl XLV Play Finder Pit

=== Statistical comparison ===
| | Pittsburgh Steelers | Green Bay Packers |
|---|---|---|
| First downs | 19 | 15 |
| First downs rushing | 8 | 4 |
| First downs passing | 11 | 11 |
| First downs penalty | 0 | 0 |
| Third down efficiency | 7/13 | 6/13 |
| Fourth down efficiency | 0/1 | 0/0 |
| Net yards rushing | 126 | 50 |
| Rushing attempts | 23 | 13 |
| Yards per rush | 5.5 | 3.8 |
| Passing – Completions-attempts | 25/40 | 24/39 |
| Times sacked-total yards | 1–2 | 3–16 |
| Interceptions thrown | 2 | 0 |
| Net yards passing | 261 | 288 |
| Total net yards | 387 | 338 |
| Punt returns-total yards | 4–5 | 1–0 |
| Kickoff returns-total yards | 6–111 | 3–63 |
| Interceptions-total return yards | 0–0 | 2–38 |
| Punts-average yardage | 3–51.0 | 6–40.5 |
| Fumbles-lost | 1–1 | 1–0 |
| Penalties-yards | 6–55 | 7–67 |
| Time of possession | 33:25 | 26:35 |
| Turnovers | 3 | 0 |

Records set
| Fewest Rushing Attempts, Game, Both Teams | 36 | Green Bay (13), Pittsburgh (23) |
Records tied
| Most Super Bowl Games Played, Team | 8 | Pittsburgh |
| Fewest Turnovers, Game, Team | 0 | Green Bay |
| Most Points, First Quarter, Team | 14 | Green Bay |
| Largest Lead, End of First Quarter, Team | 14 | Green Bay, led 14–0 |
| Fewest First Downs by Penalty, Both Teams | 0 | Green Bay 0, Pittsburgh 0 |
| Fewest Rushing Attempts, Game, Winning Team | 13 | Green Bay |
| Most 2-Point Conversions, Game | 1 | Antwaan Randle El, Pittsburgh |

=== Individual statistics ===
Steelers passing
| | C/ATT^{1} | Yds | TD | INT | Rating |
|---|---|---|---|---|---|
| Ben Roethlisberger | 25/40 | 263 | 2 | 2 | 77.4 |
Steelers rushing
| | Car^{2} | Yds | TD | LG^{3} | Yds/Car |
| Rashard Mendenhall | 14 | 63 | 1 | 17 | 4.50 |
| Ben Roethlisberger | 4 | 31 | 0 | 18 | 7.75 |
| Isaac Redman | 2 | 19 | 0 | 16 | 9.50 |
| Mewelde Moore | 3 | 13 | 0 | 7 | 4.33 |
Steelers receiving
| | Rec^{4} | Yds | TD | LG^{3} | Target^{5} |
| Mike Wallace | 9 | 89 | 1 | 25T | 16 |
| Hines Ward | 7 | 78 | 1 | 17 | 9 |
| Antwaan Randle El | 2 | 50 | 0 | 37 | 2 |
| Emmanuel Sanders | 2 | 17 | 0 | 13 | 3 |
| Heath Miller | 2 | 12 | 0 | 15 | 4 |
| Matt Spaeth | 1 | 9 | 0 | 9 | 1 |
| Rashard Mendenhall | 1 | 7 | 0 | 7 | 1 |
| Antonio Brown | 1 | 1 | 0 | 1 | 3 |

Packers passing
| | C/ATT^{1} | Yds | TD | INT | Rating |
|---|---|---|---|---|---|
| Aaron Rodgers | 24/39 | 304 | 3 | 0 | 111.5 |
Packers rushing
| | Car^{2} | Yds | TD | LG^{3} | Yds/Car |
| James Starks | 11 | 52 | 0 | 14 | 4.73 |
| Aaron Rodgers | 2 | –2 | 0 | –1 | –1.00 |
Packers receiving
| | Rec^{4} | Yds | TD | LG^{3} | Target^{5} |
| Jordy Nelson | 9 | 140 | 1 | 38 | 15 |
| Greg Jennings | 4 | 64 | 2 | 31 | 7 |
| James Jones | 5 | 50 | 0 | 21 | 6 |
| Donald Driver | 2 | 28 | 0 | 24 | 2 |
| Brandon Jackson | 1 | 14 | 0 | 14 | 2 |
| Andrew Quarless | 1 | 5 | 0 | 5 | 2 |
| Korey Hall | 1 | 2 | 0 | 2 | 1 |
| Tom Crabtree | 1 | 1 | 0 | 1 | 1 |
| Brett Swain | 0 | 0 | 0 | 0 | 2 |
| James Starks | 0 | 0 | 0 | 0 | 1 |

^{1}Completions/attempts ^{2}Carries ^{3}Long gain ^{4}Receptions ^{5}Times targeted

== Starting lineups ==
Hall of Fame ‡

| Pittsburgh | Position | Position | Green Bay |
|---|---|---|---|
Offense
| Ben Roethlisberger | QB | | Aaron Rodgers |
| Hines Ward | WR | | Greg Jennings |
| Jonathan Scott | LT | | Chad Clifton |
| Chris Kemoeatu | LG | | Daryn Colledge |
| Doug Legursky | C | | Scott Wells |
| Ramon Foster | RG | | Josh Sitton |
| Flozell Adams | RT | | Bryan Bulaga |
| Heath Miller | TE | RB | James Starks |
| Rashard Mendenhall | RB | WR | James Jones |
| David Johnson | FB | WR | Donald Driver |
| Matt Spaeth | TE | WR | Jordy Nelson |
Defense
| Casey Hampton | NT | LDE | Ryan Pickett |
| Brett Keisel | RDE | NT | B. J. Raji |
| LaMarr Woodley | LOLB | RDE | Howard Green |
| James Farrior | LILB | DE | C. J. Wilson |
| Lawrence Timmons | RILB | LOLB | Clay Matthews |
| James Harrison | ROLB | LILB | A. J. Hawk |
| Bryant McFadden | LCB | RILB | Desmond Bishop |
| Ryan Clark | FS | ROLB | Frank Zombo |
| Troy Polamalu‡ | SS | LCB | Charles Woodson‡ |
| Ike Taylor | RCB | FS | Nick Collins |
| William Gay | CB | RCB | Tramon Williams |

== Officials ==
- Referee – Walt Anderson
- Umpire – Chad Brown
- Head linesman – Kent Payne
- Line judge – John Hussey
- Field judge – Doug Rosenbaum
- Side judge – Mike Weatherford
- Back judge – Scott Helverson
- Alternate referee – Jerome Boger
- Alternate umpire – Rich Hall
- Alternate flank – Tom Symonette
- Alternate deep – Gary Cavaletto
- Alternate back judge – Dino Paganelli
