= KRKZ =

KRKZ may refer to:

- KRKZ-FM, a radio station (94.3 FM) licensed to Netarts, Oregon, United States
- KFKB (Washington), a defunct radio station (1490 AM) licensed to Forks, Washington, United States, which held the call sign KRKZ from 2011 to 2012
