= WGEE =

WGEE may refer to:

- WGEE (FM), a radio station (93.5 FM) licensed to serve New London, Wisconsin, United States
- WDUL, a radio station (970 AM) licensed to serve Superior, Wisconsin, which held the call sign WGEE from 2003 to 2015
- WTAQ, a radio station (1360 AM) licensed to serve Green Bay, Wisconsin, which held the call sign WGEE from the mid-70s to 2003
