= KSHD =

KSHD may refer to:

- Shenandoah Valley Regional Airport (ICAO code KSHD)
- KSHD-LP, a low-power radio station (99.1 FM) licensed to Shady Cove, Oregon, United States
