= Y100 =

Y100 or Y-100 may refer to:

- Yttrium-100 (Y-100 or ^{100}Y), an isotope of yttrium

== Radio stations branded "Y100" ==
- KCYY in San Antonio, Texas
- WHYI in Miami, Florida
- WNCY in Green Bay, Wisconsin
- WPLY, former station in Philadelphia, Pennsylvania
- WSGY, former station in Tifton, Georgia
- WXYY, former station in Rincon, Georgia
- WZJZ in Ft. Myers, Florida
