= WNFL =

- Sturgeon Bay, Wisconsin; United States
- Broadcast area: Green Bay and Northeast Wisconsin
- Frequency: 99.7 MHz
- Branding: 99.7 & 101.9 WNFL

Programming
- Format: Sports
- Affiliations: Fox Sports Radio; Milwaukee Bucks; Green Bay Phoenix men's basketball

Ownership
- Owner: Midwest Communications; (Midwest Communications, Inc.)
- Sister stations: WGEE; WIXX; WNCY-FM; WTAQ (AM/FM); WYDR

History
- First air date: February 1982
- Former call signs: WSBW (1982–1989); WQZZ (1989–1990); WHET-FM (1990–1993); WGEE-FM (1993–1996); WLTM (1996–2002); WLYD (2002–2006); WZBY (2006–2009); WRQE (2009–2010); WZDR (2010–2015); WDKF (2015–2026)
- Former frequencies: 100.1 MHz (1982–1986)
- Call sign meaning: "No Finer Listening", though also the station at the time carried games of the Green Bay Packers of the National Football League

Technical information
- Licensing authority: FCC
- Facility ID: 42090
- Class: C2
- ERP: 46,000 watts
- HAAT: 156 meters (512 ft)
- Transmitter coordinates: 44°38′8″N 87°37′37″W

Links
- Public license information: Public file; LMS
- Webcast: Listen live
- Website: wnflsports.com

WNFL (99.7 FM) is a radio station licensed to Sturgeon Bay, Wisconsin, United States. The station serves the Green Bay area with a sports talk format as "99.7 & 101.9 WNFL". The station is owned by Midwest Communications, with studios in Bellevue, and its main transmitter located near the town of Lincoln in Kewaunee County.

== History ==
This station began broadcasting by March 1982 as WSBW at 100.1 MHz. It was owned by the Davison Communications Corporation, headed by Martin Erickson, former publisher of a weekly newspaper in Cashton, Wisconsin. Its original tower was toppled by vandals in 1983. In March 1987, it was sold to Milwaukee attorney Quinn Martin. It moved to 99.7 MHz at 50,000 watts and was airing a satellite-fed adult contemporary format. In February 1989, the station changed call signs to WQZZ, for promotional purchases and partly in recognition that its signal now extended well beyond Sturgeon Bay. On November 30, 1990, WQZZ became WHET-FM and adopted a new satellite-fed top 40 (CHR) format as "99.7 The Heat" to compete with Top 40 station WIXX; the station would go to an all-local Top 40 operation in October 1992.

By 1993, new Federal Communications Commission (FCC) rules allowed companies to own a second FM frequency in a market, and WHET's owners sold the station to Midwest Communications that year. Midwest planned to replace the "Heat" format to avoid direct competition with its heritage Top 40 station, WIXX, plans unexpectedly 'helped' along by severe storms that twice knocked WHET off the air in June and July 1993; the second storm cooled down "The Heat" permanently, as Midwest used the outage to repair the signal, terminate WHET's airstaff, and begin its transition to country. By August 1993, the station became "99 Country", using the WGEE-FM call sign (mirroring that of its heritage country sister station, the current WTAQ) and using a 24/7 local operation in comparison to its mostly satellite-fed competitor, WJLW.

WGEE-FM remained as "99 Country" until September 1996, when FCC ownership rules were further loosened, allowing Midwest Communications to purchase WNCY-FM, which by then as new country-focused "Y-100" had surpassed WJLW and WGEE-FM to area dominance of the format compared to the latter's older audience focus. Midwest would make few changes to WNCY outside of formatting it similarly to WIXX's own acclaimed presentation, and change WGEE-FM to an adult contemporary station under the WLTM call sign.

In January 1999, Midwest would move WLTM to a simulcast with its similarly-formatted WROE, a simulcast that would last until March 19, 2001, when WLTM adopted a more upbeat hot AC format as "Magic 99.7", with a schedule featuring Rick Dees's syndicated morning show.

On March 25, 2002, at 3 p.m., 99.7 switched formats again to a brand new (for Northeast Wisconsin) rhythmic format as WLYD ("Wild 99-7"), while sister heritage Top 40 sister station WIXX gravitated to a rock-leaning top 40 format. The first song on "Wild" was "Rollout (My Business)" by Ludacris. Although designed to be a flanker station for WIXX, "Wild 99-7" and its unique format for Green Bay would soon become one of the better-rated stations in the Green Bay market. "Wild 99-7" forced top 40 station WKSZ "95.9 Kiss FM" (WIXX's competition) to flip to hot AC as "Mix 95.9" in April 2003.

On February 18, 2006, at midnight, "Wild 99-7" would end as 'poor advertising sales' and declining ratings on the station forced Midwest to flip WLYD to a more advertiser-friendly adult hits format under the new call sign of WZBY ("99.7 The Bay"). One month later in March 2006, WKSZ reverted to "Kiss FM" and the Top 40 format, this time with a rhythmic lean to pick up on former "Wild 99-7" listeners. WZBY would evolve to classic hits by September 2008, and in early 2009, began a simulcast on translator W270AJ (101.9 FM) to help with 99.7's signal issues in the immediate Green Bay area. On September 15, 2009, WZBY and its "Bay" format would give way with a second simulcast with the Fox Valley's WROE, this time under the similar call sign of WRQE.

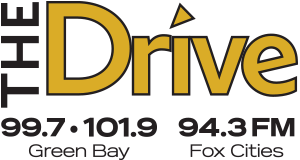
Logo as "The Drive"

Midwest Communications dropped the adult contemporary format a second time leading into Labor Day weekend on September 3, 2010. The stations became WYDR (94.3) and WZDR (99.7/101.9), and adopted a classic hits/classic rock hybrid format as "The Drive", a format similar to that of WDRV in Chicago and sister classic rock station WOZZ, which adopted a mainstream rock format at the same time and date (and using 99.7's former WRQE call sign).

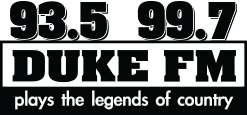
Logo as "Duke FM"

On March 16, 2015, WZDR and translator W270AJ flipped to a simulcast of classic country-formatted WGEE-FM, branded as "Duke FM" (under new calls, WDKF), a format named in honor of Midwest Communications founder Duey "Duke" Wright. W270AJ later became a translator for WNFL (1440 AM)'s sports radio format.

On October 13, 2025, WDKF began to simulcast WNFL's programming, beginning the process of transferring its format from AM to FM in concert with many sports-focused stations shifting away from AM. The WNFL call sign moved to the FM facility on February 2, 2026, with 1440 AM assuming the WDKF calls as part of a swap. WNFL's translator W270AJ, had no restrictions requiring it to simulcast 1440 AM, was reassigned to translate 99.7 FM in July, and in September, 1440 AM was taken silent.
