= WNFL (AM) =

WDKF
Currently silent
- Green Bay, Wisconsin; United States
- Broadcast area: Northeast Wisconsin
- Frequency: 1440 kHz

Ownership
- Owner: Midwest Communications; (Midwest Communications, Inc.)
- Sister stations: WDKF; WGEE; WIXX; WNCY-FM; WTAQ; WYDR

History
- First air date: December 12, 1947 (as WJPG at 810 kHz)
- Former call signs: WJPG (1947–1967)
- Former frequencies: 810 kHz (1947–1951)

Technical information
- Licensing authority: FCC
- Facility ID: 9966
- Class: B
- Power: 5,000 watts (day); 500 watts (night)
- Transmitter coordinates: 44°28′40″N 88°00′00″W

Links
- Public license information: Public file; LMS

WNFL (1440 AM) is a radio station in Green Bay, Wisconsin, United States. The station, currently silent, last broadcast in September 2026 with a sports radio format. The station is owned and operated by Green Bay–based Midwest Communications and has studios and transmitter on Bellevue Street in the Green Bay suburb of Bellevue.

== History ==
The Green Bay Press-Gazette built WJPG – a daytimer – in 1947 and it began broadcasting with 1,000 watts of power on 810 kHz on December 12, 1947. Nighttime service was added in the station's early ears, and WJPG changed AM frequencies from 810 to 1440 kHz on May 24, 1951. Daytime power was increased to 5,000 watts on June 16, 1954.

WJPG was a CONELRAD authorized radio station, meaning that if CONELRAD were activated, WJPG would remain on the air and transmit emergency information. A CONELRAD alarm was incorrectly sent to the WJPG control station on the evening of November 5, 1959. The message sent to the control station was "This is an air defense radio alert", rather than what should have been sent for a test, "This is an air defense line check." Northeast Wisconsin's three television stations (WFRV-TV, WLUK-TV, and WBAY-TV) and radio stations WBAY and WJPG were all taken offline for 20 minutes as they prepared to implement CONELRAD alert procedures, until the error was realized and the alert preparation was reversed.

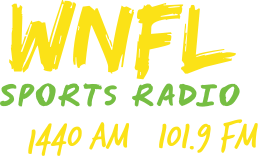
Logo prior to 2025

WJPG changed its call letters to WNFL on August 7, 1967, several months after the Green Bay Packers won Super Bowl I. Despite the obvious association and the fact that the station aired Packers games at the time, the call sign was actually said to stand for "No Finer Listening". WNFL changed ownership several times until 1996, when Midwest Communications acquired the station, along with sister stations WNCY and WYDR (then WROE).

On October 13, 2025, WNFL began simulcasting on WDKF (99.7 FM), licensed to Sturgeon Bay, and rebranded as "99.7 & 101.9 WNFL". At that time, WNFL added several programs originating at WSSP in Milwaukee. The WNFL call sign moved to the FM facility on February 2, 2026, in a swap that gave the AM facility the WDKF call sign. W270AJ, its FM translator, was reassigned to 99.7 in July, and in September, 1440 AM was taken silent for economic reasons.

== Notable personalities ==
- Mason Crosby
- Steve Czaban
- John Kuhn
