= KBDB =

KBDB may refer to:

- KBDB-FM, a radio station (103.9 FM) licensed to serve Forks, Washington, United States
- KNNR, a radio station (1400 AM) licensed to serve Sparks, Nevada, United States, which held the call sign KBDB from 2000 to 2012
