= KBIS =

KBIS may refer to:

- The ICAO code for Bismarck Municipal Airport
- KBIS-LD, a low-power television station (channel 4, virtual 38) licensed to serve Turlock, California, United States
- KFKB (Washington), a radio station (1490 AM) licensed to Forks, Washington, United States, which held the call sign KBIS from 2005 to 2011
- Kitchen/Bath Industry Show & Conference
- in France, a Kbis extract (« extrait Kbis ») is a document proving the registration of a company, including individuals.
