= WIWU =

WIWU may refer to:

- WIWU-LP, a low-power radio station (94.3 FM) licensed to serve Marion, Indiana, United States
- WJSJ-CD, a low-power television station (channel 28, virtual 51) licensed to serve Tipton, Indiana, which held the call signs WIWU-LP, WIWU-CA, or WIWU-CD from 1996 to 2021
