= XHQE-FM =

Radio station in Escuinapa, Sinaloa

- Escuinapa, Sinaloa; Mexico
- Frequency: 94.3 FM
- Branding: La Kañona

Programming
- Format: Regional Mexican

Ownership
- Owner: Sucesión de Francisco Millán Ramos (Corporativo Megamedios Sur)

History
- First air date: August 31, 1948 (concession)

Technical information
- Licensing authority: CRT
- Class: B1
- ERP: 25 kW
- HAAT: 1.06 m (3 ft 6 in)
- Transmitter coordinates: 22°50′16″N 105°47′16″W

Links
- Website: lakañona.com

XHQE-FM is a radio station on 94.3 FM in Escuinapa, Sinaloa. It is known as La Kañona with a Regional Mexican format.

== History ==
XEQE-AM 1340 received its concession on August 31, 1948. It operated with 250 watts. In the 1980s, power was increased to 500 watts and again to a full 1,000 in the 1990s.

XEQE was moved to FM in 2011 as XHQE-FM 94.3.
