= WNCY-FM =

Coordinates: 44.257°N 88.195°W

- Neenah-Menasha, Wisconsin; United States
- Broadcast area: Green Bay-Fox Cities
- Frequency: 100.3 MHz
- Branding: Y100

Programming
- Format: Country

Ownership
- Owner: Midwest Communications
- Sister stations: WDKF, WGEE, WIXX, WNFL, WTAQ, WYDR

History
- First air date: 1977
- Former call signs: WEMI-FM (1977–1995)
- Former frequencies: 100.1 MHz (1977–1995)
- Call sign meaning: Station's playlist is predominantly new country songs

Technical information
- Licensing authority: FCC
- Facility ID: 9965
- Class: C2
- ERP: 50,000 watts
- HAAT: 149 meters
- Translator: 92.1 W221DA (Howard)

Links
- Public license information: Public file; LMS
- Webcast: Listen Live; Listen live (via iHeartRadio)
- Website: www.wncy.com

WNCY-FM (100.3 MHz, "Y100") is an American commercial country music formatted radio station licensed to Neenah-Menasha, Wisconsin, that serves the Green Bay and Appleton-Oshkosh areas. WNCY is owned and operated by Midwest Communications, which owns six other radio stations in Northeast Wisconsin. WNCY's studios are located at 1420 Bellevue Street in Bellevue, while its transmitter is located in a rural area east of the city of Kaukauna.

On July 18, 2006, Midwest Communications broke ground on their new, $4.725 million facility in Bellevue, and WNCY moved into the new broadcast center in January 2008. The facility is located on the WNFL tower site on Bellevue Street. WNCY and the six other Midwest Communications stations in Northeast Wisconsin are now located in the new facility.

WNCY, along with the other Midwest stations in Green Bay, simulcasts WIXX if a tornado warning is in effect within Northeast Wisconsin.

== Current on-air staff ==
- Shotgun Shannon
- Natalie (Nat)
- Rachel Chase
- Steve Davis
- Hannah
- Shawn
- Kory Davis
- Shane Reno
- David Kaye
- Brianne

== History ==
100.3 was WEMI-FM at 100.1 until it moved to its current frequency of 100.3 on May 17, 1995, and started their country format.
