= WIXX =

Radio station in Green Bay, Wisconsin

Coordinates: 44.410°N 88.001°W

- Green Bay, Wisconsin; United States
- Broadcast area: Green Bay–Fox Cities
- Frequency: 101.1 MHz
- Branding: 101 WIXX

Programming
- Format: UTF-Top 40/CHR
- Affiliations: Packers Radio Network

Ownership
- Owner: Midwest Communications; (Midwest Communications, Inc.)
- Sister stations: WDKF, WGEE, WNCY-FM, WNFL, WTAQ-AM-FM, WYDR

History
- First air date: August 13, 1947 (as WJPG-FM)
- Former call signs: WJPG-FM (August 13, 1947–1954); WBAY-FM (1960–1975)
- Call sign meaning: Intended to be a visual pun on "gee whiz" in combination with sister station WGEE; with the intended calls of WIZZ already assigned, the next available 4-letter calls were taken

Technical information
- Licensing authority: FCC
- Facility ID: 42087
- Class: C
- ERP: 100,000 watts
- HAAT: 329 meters (1,079 ft)

Links
- Public license information: Public file; LMS
- Webcast: Listen Live
- Website: www.wixx.com

WIXX (101.1 FM) is a Top 40/CHR radio station licensed to and serving Green Bay, Wisconsin and the Fox Cities region of Northeast Wisconsin. The station is owned and operated by Wausau, Wisconsin-based Midwest Communications, and is part of a Midwest-owned cluster of 8 stations in the market. WIXX broadcasts from studios located on Bellevue Street in the Green Bay suburb of Bellevue, and transmits from a tower on Scray Hill in the Brown County town of Ledgeview, sharing a site with WBAY-TV, WPNE-TV, and WPNE-FM.

== History ==
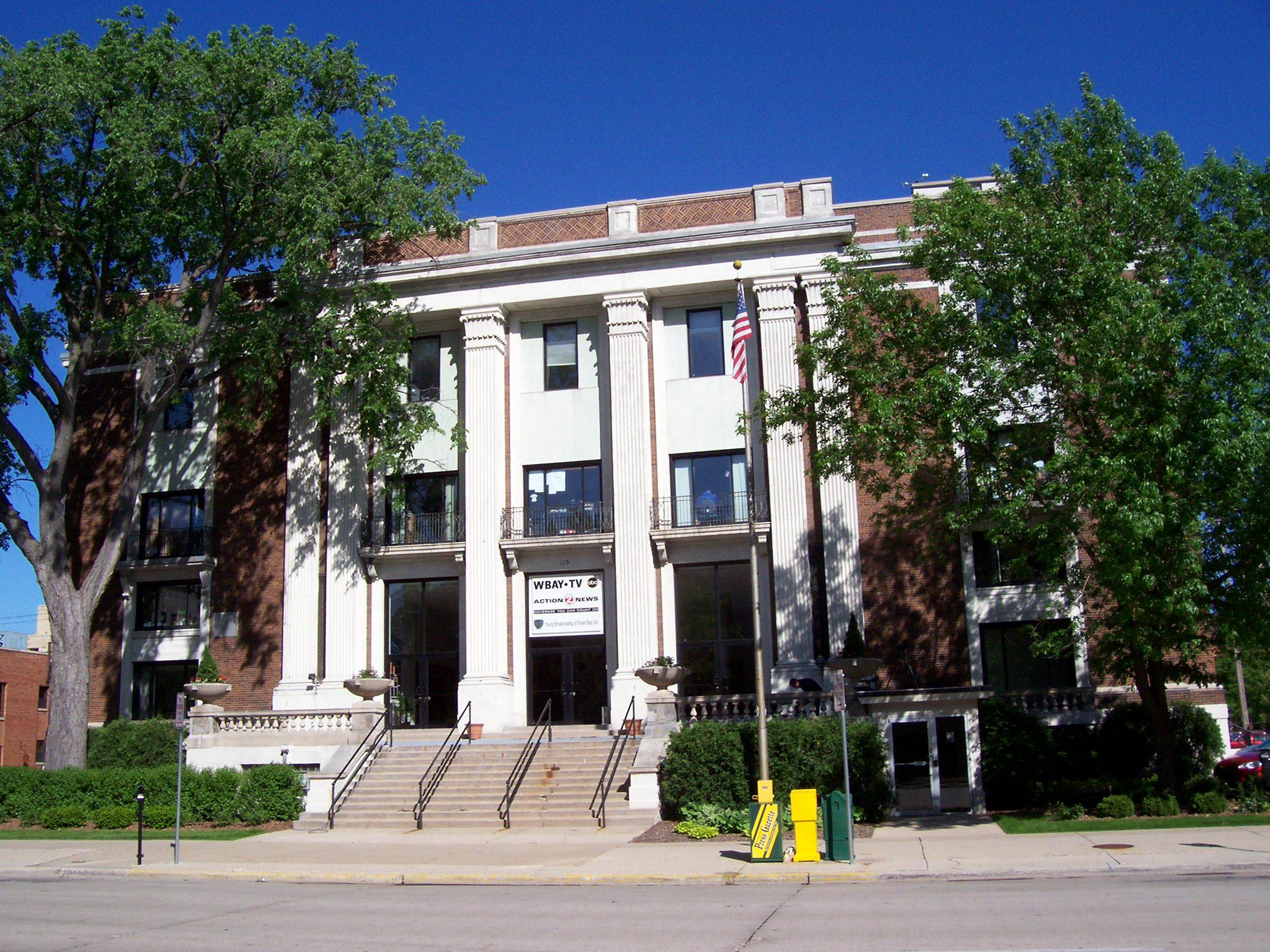
WIXX operated from studios in the WBAY-TV Building until 2008.

The station, with the original call letters WJPG-FM, was owned by the Green Bay Press-Gazette to complement their then-owned station WJPG (now WNFL). WJPG-FM began broadcasting August 13, 1947, though there is no record of the Press-Gazette regularly broadcasting on the FM signal. Eventually, the Press-Gazette would sell WJPG-FM to the Norbertine Order of Priests, a De Pere-based religious order that founded St. Norbert College. The well-financed Norbertines were interested in complementing their existing stations in the Green Bay market, WBAY radio (AM 1360) and WBAY-TV (channel 2). WJPG-FM would eventually become WBAY-FM, and for many years would air easy-listening and middle-of-the-road music formats.

By the mid-1970s, the Norbertine Order would sell its broadcast holdings, with WBAY-AM-FM being sold to what would become Midwest Communications. On September 1, 1975, the radio stations would be given new call signs; the AM would become WGEE, while WBAY-FM would take on the WIXX calls. The story of the WIXX call sign has been unclear; though it was believed to be part of a "gee whiz" pun with WGEE, Midwest Communications head Duke Wright has been somewhat coy, stating in 2007 that he was into "X"s and "Z"s back then and WIXX sounds "better than 'WIZZ'". Even after their split in 1975, the radio and TV stations would continue to be housed at 115 South Jefferson Street in downtown Green Bay until 2008, when WIXX, WTAQ (which flipped back to its original callsign from WGEE in 2003), and their Midwest sister stations would move to new facilities in Bellevue, next to the transmitter facility of Midwest-owned WNFL. (WBAY-TV remains at South Jefferson to this day.)

By the time the Norbertines sold WIXX, the station had adopted an Album-Oriented Rock (AOR) format. That format was dropped on February 12, 1977, when, in a move that was met with protest by fans of the AOR format, WIXX adopted the Top 40/CHR format that continues to this day. Though initially going automated as a Top 40 station, WIXX would gradually add live dayparts, including in mornings, and would become a fully live station by the mid-1980s.

Today, WIXX is regarded as a heritage Top 40 station, thanks in part to its longevity in the format, its connections with its audience through round-the-clock staffing and local music surveys, and its flexibility to introduce new music to listeners as well as incorporating modern rock and Hot AC music into the playlist. It has resulted in honors for the station, including the 2007 Station of the Year Award in the CHR/Top 40 category for market size 101–250 at the national Radio & Records convention. WIXX also benefits from the long reach of its 101.1 FM signal, which can be regularly received as far north as Michigan's Upper Peninsula and as far south as Milwaukee. They take advantage of that coverage whenever tornado warnings are issued by broadcasting continuous coverage on all of its sister stations.
