= WGEE (FM) =

Coordinates: 44.546°N 88.549°W

- New London, Wisconsin; United States
- Broadcast area: Appleton, Black Wolf, Oshkosh, and Green Bay, Wisconsin
- Frequency: 93.5 MHz
- Branding: 93.5 Duke FM

Programming
- Format: Classic country

Ownership
- Owner: Midwest Communications; (Midwest Communications, Inc.)
- Sister stations: WDKF, WIXX, WNCY-FM, WNFL, WTAQ (AM/FM), WYDR

History
- First air date: 1967 (as WLIH-FM)
- Former call signs: WLIH-FM (10/1957-7/1981); WNBK (7/1981-1/1989); WOZZ (1/1989-9/2010); WRQE (2010–2014); WGEE-FM (2014–2015)
- Call sign meaning: GrEEn Bay

Technical information
- Licensing authority: FCC
- Facility ID: 42089
- Class: C2
- ERP: 50,000 watts
- HAAT: 150 meters
- Translator: 93.1 W226BD (Green Bay)

Links
- Public license information: Public file; LMS
- Webcast: Listen Live
- Website: www.935dukefm.com

WGEE (93.5 MHz, "93.5 Duke FM") is a classic country FM radio station owned and operated by Midwest Communications, licensed to New London, Wisconsin, and serving the Northeast Wisconsin area, including Appleton, Oshkosh, and Green Bay (the latter city aided by a translator at 93.1 FM, W226BD). WGEE's studios are located on Bellevue Street in Green Bay, while its main transmitter is located in Maine Township in Outagamie County, Wisconsin.

== History ==
Former logo as WOZZ, c. 2008

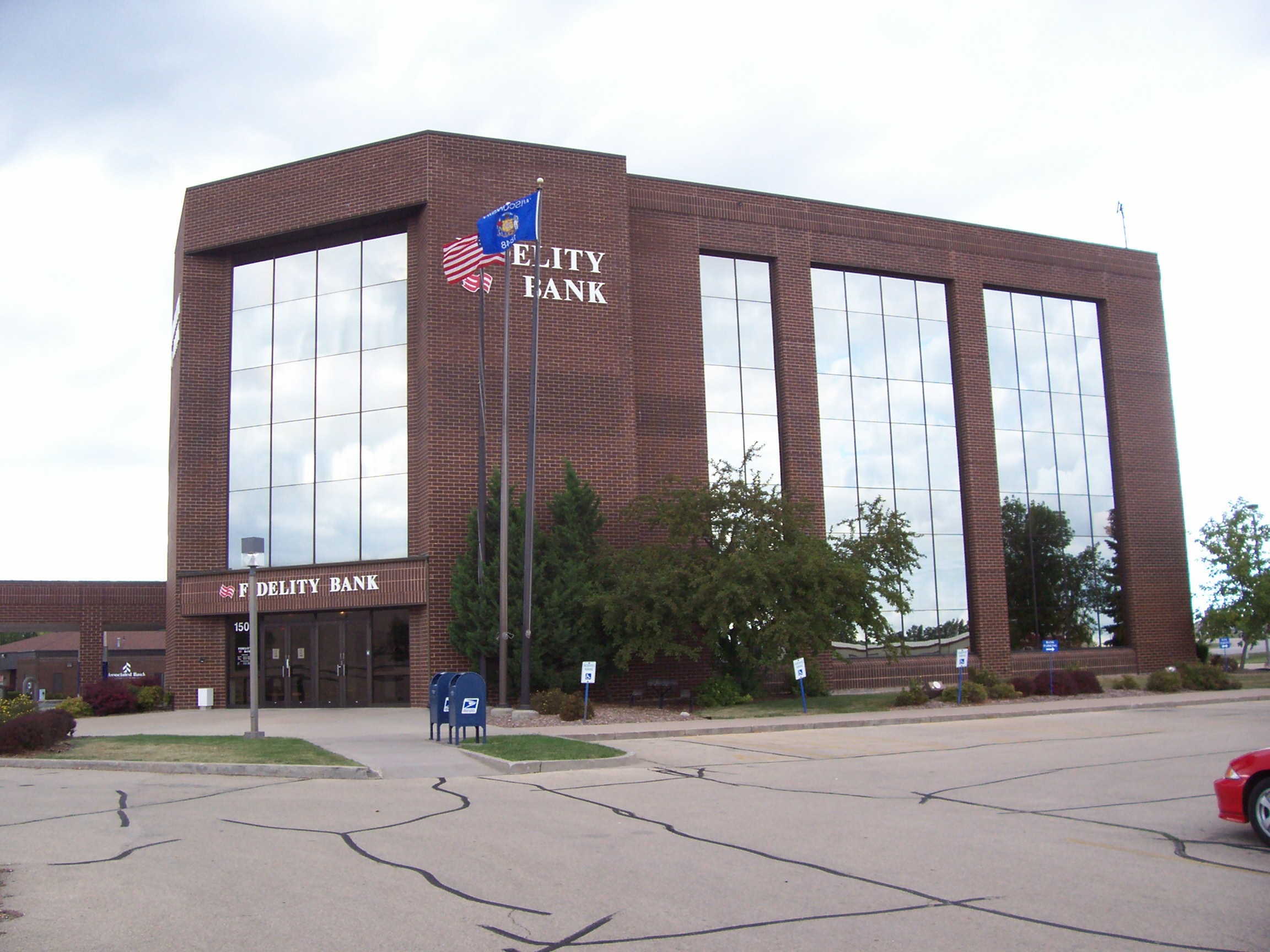
Former location of WOZZ studios, c. 2006

The station was opened in 1967 as WLIH, with its studios and transmitter just southeast of New London. The call letters played off a Wisconsin tourism slogan at the time, We Like It Here. Those call letters are now used by a station in Whitneyville, Pennsylvania. In 1981, the station was bought by the owners of the New London National Bank (now part of Citizens Bank, who changed the call letters to WNBK. Under both owners, the station carried music, local news and local high school sports. Those call letters are now used by a repeater station in Whitmire, South Carolina.

On August 28, 1989, the station increased its power to 50,000 watts, changed call letters to WOZZ (using branding and imaging that alluded to The Wizard of Oz), and flipped from country to adult contemporary.

In February 1991, WOZZ flipped to a classic rock format (branded as "93.5 WOZZ, The Classic Rock Station") that featured songs from the 1960s, 1970s, and 1980s. Midwest Communications bought the station in February 1993. WOZZ previously had studios in the former Fidelity Bank building in Appleton until 2008, when Midwest Communications moved all its Green Bay and Appleton-area stations under one roof in new facilities in Bellevue, a Green Bay suburb. However, to this day, the station maintains a control room and sales office in Appleton to meet Federal Communications Commission requirements.

Classic rock would continue on WOZZ until the week of September 3, 2010; during that week, WOZZ ran an online stunt on Facebook under the user name "What Does It All Mean?" The profile page included short videos featuring WOZZ personality David Burns and painted rocks counting down days ("5 days," "4 days," etc.). Speculation was of a format flip to a mainstream rock format, which is what occurred at 5 PM on September 3, after REO Speedwagon's "Time for Me to Fly" concluded; at that time, a brief audio montage (including the playing of "For Those About to Rock" by AC/DC) introduced "93 Rock", which promised a mix of classic rock music from the 1970s, 1980s, and 1990s in a less-sedate on-air presentation. Sammy Hagar's "There's Only One Way to Rock" was the first song played on "93 Rock." With the format flip, the station adopted the WRQE call sign formerly found on its sister station at 99.7 FM (which adopted a classic hits format at the same time and day 93.5 FM adopted its new format).The Bob and Tom Show, a holdover from WOZZ, would continue to air during "93 Rock's" morning drive time (5-9 AM). The "93 Rock" format had recently been adopted on Midwest Communication-owned sister stations in Duluth (on KDAL-FM) and Wausau (on WOZZ, the call sign was transferred from WRQE's previous classic rock format to the Wausau station at the time of the flip).

By the summer of 2011, "93 Rock" tweaked to a full blown mainstream rock format playing a mix of classic rock and rock from the 1970s, 1980s, 1990s, 2000s, to current active rock music.

On September 8, 2014, Midwest Communications announced that the “93 Rock” format on WRQE and W226BD would end on September 11, following a farewell event on that date. The last song on "93 Rock" was "You Never Met a Motherf***er Quite Like Me" by Kid Rock. On September 12, at Midnight, both 93.5 and 93.1 flipped to a classic country format, branded as "93.5 Duke FM," that complements Midwest's contemporary country-formatted WNCY-FM. ("Duke" is a reference to John Wayne, and was first applied by Midwest to a Terre Haute station that converted to classic country earlier in 2014.) The first song on "93.5 Duke FM" was "Baby Likes to Rock It" by The Tractors. To coincide with the format change, the call sign at 93.5 changed to WGEE-FM, resurrecting classic calls used twice before on Midwest-owned country stations in Green Bay, originally at 1360 AM (the current WTAQ) and during the mid-1990s at 99.7 FM (the current WDKF). (The "-FM" suffix of the call sign was dropped on March 23, 2015.)

On October 13, 2025, WGEE simulcaster WDKF 99.7 FM Sturgeon Bay dropped the simulcast with WGEE and switched to a simulcast of sports-formatted WNFL 1440 AM Green Bay.

== Previous logo ==
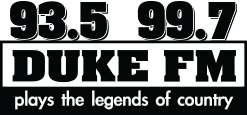
