= XHPJON-FM =

Radio station in Jonuta, Tabasco, Mexico

- Jonuta, Tabasco; Mexico
- Frequency: 94.3 FM
- Branding: Radio Río

Programming
- Format: Regional Mexican

Ownership
- Owner: FM Comunicación Efectiva, S.A.P.I. de C.V.

History
- First air date: January 2018
- Call sign meaning: JONuta

Technical information
- Class: A
- ERP: 500 watts
- HAAT: 92.3 m (303 ft)
- Transmitter coordinates: 18°05′48.12″N 92°09′47.16″W

Links
- Website: XHPJON-FM on Facebook

XHPJON-FM is a radio station on 94.3 FM in Jonuta, Tabasco. It is known as Radio Río and owned by FM Comunicación Efectiva, S.A.P.I. de C.V. It carries a Regional Mexican format.

== History ==
XHPJON was awarded in the IFT-4 radio auction of 2017 — the only new FM station in Tabasco as a result of the auction — and officially came to air in January 2018, becoming the first commercial radio station in Jonuta. FM Comunicación Efectiva is jointly owned by Beatriz Elvira Cruz Méndez and Genoveva Gloria Prats Fernández.
