= WYDR =

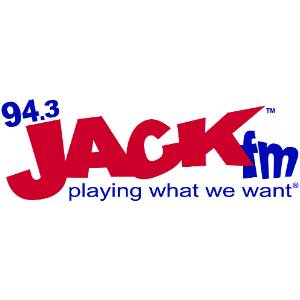
- Neenah-Menasha, Wisconsin; United States
- Broadcast area: Appleton-Oshkosh, and the Fox Valley of Wisconsin
- Frequency: 94.3 MHz
- Branding: 94.3 Jack FM

Programming
- Format: Variety hits
- Affiliations: Jack FM network Packers Radio Network

Ownership
- Owner: Midwest Communications; (Midwest Communications, Inc.)
- Sister stations: WDKF, WGEE, WIXX, WNCY-FM, WNFL, WTAQ-AM/FM

History
- First air date: 1971 (as WROE)
- Former call signs: WROE (1971–2010)
- Call sign meaning: "DR." is an abbreviation for "Drive", the station's former branding

Technical information
- Licensing authority: FCC
- Facility ID: 9962
- Class: C3
- ERP: 13,000 watts
- HAAT: 140 meters (460 ft)
- Transmitter coordinates: 44°9′30.00″N 88°17′3.00″W

Links
- Public license information: Public file; LMS
- Webcast: Listen live
- Website: www.943jackfm.com

WYDR (94.3 FM, "94.3 Jack FM") is a radio station broadcasting a variety hits music format, licensed to both Neenah and Menasha, Wisconsin (giving it and sister station WNCY-FM a rare dual cities of license situation) and transmitting from High Cliff State Park in Northwestern Calumet County. WYDR has its studios at Midwest Communications' facilities on Bellevue Street in the Green Bay suburb of Bellevue, adjacent to the tower site of sister station WNFL.

With the start of the 2022 season, WYDR serves as the Fox Cities affiliate of the Packers Radio Network, replacing Woodward Communications' WAPL (105.7).

== History ==
The station that would eventually become WYDR was launched by Midwest Communications in 1971 under the call sign of WROE with a beautiful music format, a format found quite frequently on FM radio in that era. In 1977, Midwest bought WBAY-AM and WBAY-FM (the current WTAQ and WIXX, respectively), forcing the company to sell WROE due to FCC regulations limiting station ownership at the time. WROE received consistently high audience rating numbers through the 1980s, as "Easy 94.3", or simply, "Roe".

After a long run with beautiful music, WROE changed to a soft AC format in January 1990, using the advertising tagline "Soft Favorites". In 1997, Midwest repurchased WROE and sister stations WNCY-FM and WNFL after 1996 loosening of radio ownership rules permitted them to do so. From 1998 to 2001, WROE simulcast on sister station WLTM, with the stations branded as "The Lite FM, 94.3 and 99.7." During this time, WROE and WLTM would add Delilah's nationally syndicated program (though it would eventually drop it later in the 2000s). When WLTM dropped away from the simulcast in March 2001 and launched its own format, WROE reverted to using its call sign for on-air branding.

In March 2006, WROE made a shift toward an adult hits format, branded as "94.3 The Bridge." On November 14, 2008, the station dropped "The Bridge" and reverted to its WROE branding and Soft AC format. In August 2009, the station rejoined in a simulcast with 99.7 FM and its Green Bay translator at 101.9 FM, which dropped its own adult hits format. WROE and WRQE would eventually add the John Tesh nightly radio program after the show's former home in the Fox Cities, WECB, changed formats at the end of 2009.

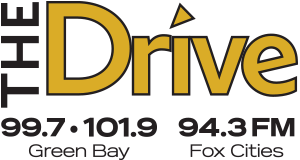
WYDR's former logo (with WZDR simulcast) as "The Drive"

At 5 p.m. on September 3, 2010, Midwest Communications dropped the Soft AC format a second time, and with it WROE's longtime call sign. The stations became WYDR (94.3) and WZDR (99.7/101.9) and adopted a classic hits/classic rock hybrid format as "The Drive," a format similar to that of WDRV in Chicago and sister station WOZZ, which adopted a more mainstream rock format at the same time and date as "The Drive's" debut (and using 99.7's former WRQE call sign).

On March 16, 2015, WZDR split off from its simulcast with WYDR, changing its call sign to WDKF. WDKF now simulcasts with sister station WGEE (93.5 Duke FM).

On October 23, 2015, WYDR dropped the "Drive" format after five years and rebranded as a Jack FM affiliate. This is the second time that the station has adopted an Adult Hits format (since "The Bridge" in 2006). While WYDR pays to license the Jack FM name, the station is locally programmed and is not part of the syndicated format that is delivered via satellite.
