= XHVO-FM =

Radio station in San Rafael, Veracruz

San Rafael, Veracruz; Mexico
- Frequency: 94.3 FM
- Branding: La Mega 94.3 FM

Programming
- Format: Grupera

Ownership
- Owner: Grupo MS Multimedios; (Radio X.E.V.O., S.A. de C.V.)

History
- First air date: June 22, 1970 (concession)

Technical information
- Class: AA
- ERP: 6 kW
- Transmitter coordinates: 20°11′41.5″N 96°51′58″W

Links
- Website: www.mega94fm.com

XHVO-FM is a radio station on 94.3 FM in San Rafael, Veracruz, known as La Mega.

== History ==
XEVO-AM 1520 received its concession on June 22, 1970. It was a 250-watt daytimer owned by Manuel Bernal Mejía. In the 2000s, it increased power to 1,000 watts and began broadcasting at night with 1,000 watts.

XEVO moved to FM in 2010 as XHVO-FM 94.3.
