= KYXX =

- Ozona, Texas; United States
- Broadcast area: San Angelo, Texas
- Frequency: 94.3 MHz
- Branding: Real Country

Programming
- Format: Classic Country

Ownership
- Owner: Tenn-Vol Corp.

Technical information
- Licensing authority: FCC
- Facility ID: 60845
- Class: A
- ERP: 3,000 watts
- HAAT: 120 meters (390 ft)
- Transmitter coordinates: 30°42′42.60″N 101°7′28.70″W

Links
- Public license information: Public file; LMS

KYXX (94.3 FM) is a radio station broadcasting a classic country music format. Licensed to Ozona, Texas, United States, the station serves the San Angelo area. The station is currently owned by Tenn-Vol Corp.
