= KFKB (Washington) =

Radio station in Forks, Washington, US

- Forks, Washington; United States
- Frequency: 1490 kHz

Programming
- Format: Classic country

Ownership
- Owner: Forks Broadcasting, Inc.
- Sister stations: KBDB-FM

History
- First air date: 1967
- Last air date: May 21, 2019
- Former call signs: KVAC (1967-2005); KBIS (2005–2011); KRKZ (2011–2012)

Technical information
- Facility ID: 28209
- Class: C
- Power: 1,000 watts unlimited
- Transmitter coordinates: 47°57′14″N 124°23′20″W

KFKB (1490 AM) was a radio station broadcasting a classic country format to the Forks, Washington, United States area. The station was owned by Forks Broadcasting, Inc. KFKB and KBDB-FM were the only commercial radio stations serving the West End of Clallam County, Washington. Their studios and transmitter were at 260 Cedar Avenue in Forks. The station's license was cancelled on May 21, 2019.
