= WLEL =

Coordinates: 32°15′10″N 84°13′50″W

- Ellaville, Georgia; United States
- Broadcast area: Americus, Georgia
- Frequency: 94.3 MHz
- Branding: El Gallo 94.3FM

Programming
- Language: Spanish
- Format: Regional Mexican

Ownership
- Owner: Gorilla Broadcasting ATL LLC
- Sister stations: WDXQ

History
- First air date: 2009

Technical information
- Licensing authority: FCC
- Facility ID: 165968
- Class: A
- ERP: 4,800 watts
- HAAT: 100 meters (330 ft)

Links
- Public license information: Public file; LMS
- Webcast: Listen live
- Website: elgallo943.com

WLEL is a radio station airing a Regional Mexican format licensed to Ellaville, Georgia, broadcasting on 94.3 FM. It is the only Spanish-language FM radio station serving the Hispanic Latino communities of Middle Georgia and West Central Georgia. The station serves the areas of Americus, Georgia, Montezuma, Georgia, Perry, Georgia, Fort Valley, Georgia, and is owned by Gorilla Broadcasting ATL LLC
