= KXRQ =

- Roosevelt, Utah; United States
- Broadcast area: Vernal, Utah Roosevelt, Utah Duchesne, Utah
- Frequency: 94.3 MHz
- Branding: Channel X94

Programming
- Format: Top 40 (CHR)
- Affiliations: Premiere Radio Networks, Westwood One

Ownership
- Owner: Uinta Broadcasting, L.C.

Technical information
- Licensing authority: FCC
- Facility ID: 83548
- Class: C1
- ERP: 17,500 watts
- HAAT: 568.0 meters
- Transmitter coordinates: 40°31′15″N 109°42′25″W

Links
- Public license information: Public file; LMS

KXRQ (94.3 FM) is a radio station broadcasting a Top 40 (CHR) format. Licensed to Roosevelt, Utah, United States, the station is currently owned by Uinta Broadcasting, L.C. and features programming from Premiere Radio Networks and Westwood One.
