= WLLT =

Coordinates: 41.898°N 89.606°W

- Polo, Illinois; United States
- Broadcast area: Dixon / Sterling / Rock Falls
- Frequency: 94.3 MHz
- Branding: Sauk Valley Oldies 94.3

Programming
- Format: Oldies

Ownership
- Owner: White Rabbit Broadcasting LLC

History
- First air date: December 12, 1989 (at 107.7)
- Former frequencies: 107.7 MHz (1991–2018)

Technical information
- Licensing authority: FCC
- Facility ID: 59235
- Class: A
- ERP: 3,300 watts
- HAAT: 136 meters (446 ft)

Links
- Public license information: Public file; LMS

WLLT (94.3 FM) is a radio station licensed to Polo, Illinois, covering Northern Illinois, including Dixon, Sterling, Rock Falls, and Morrison. WLLT currently has an oldies format and is owned by White Rabbit Broadcasting LLC. WLLT also airs local high school sporting events and features local news. The offices and studio are located just east of Sterling, Illinois.

== History ==
The station began broadcasting at 107.7 MHz on December 12, 1989, and aired a soft adult contemporary format. By 2006, the station had begun airing an oldies format. On June 25, 2018, the station's frequency was changed to 94.3 MHz, as part of a three-way frequency swap with WQUD in Erie, Illinois and WSSQ in Sterling, Illinois.
