= WTAQ =

Radio station in Green Bay and Glenmore, Wisconsin

WTAQ and WTAQ-FM

WTAQ: Green Bay, Wisconsin; WTAQ-FM: Glenmore, Wisconsin; United States
- Broadcast area: Green Bay–Appleton–Oshkosh
- Frequencies: WTAQ: 1360 kHz; WTAQ-FM: 97.5 MHz
- Branding: NewsTalk WTAQ 1360 AM/97.5 FM

Programming
- Format: Talk radio
- Affiliations: Fox News Radio; Premiere Networks; Westwood One

Ownership
- Owner: Midwest Communications
- Sister stations: WDKF; WGEE; WIXX; WNCY-FM; WNFL; WYDR

History
- First air date: WTAQ: September 4, 1923; WTAQ-FM: February 5, 2010
- Former call signs: WTAQ: WTAQ (1923–1949); WBAY (1949–1975); WGEE (1975–2003)
- Former frequencies: WTAQ: 1180 kHz (1923–1930); 1330 kHz (1930–1941)
- Call sign meaning: Randomly assigned, later backronym of "Where Tires Are Quality"

Technical information
- Licensing authority: FCC
- Facility ID: WTAQ: 42086; WTAQ-FM: 164253
- Class: WTAQ: B; WTAQ-FM: A
- Power: WTAQ: 10,000 watts (day); 5,000 watts (night)
- ERP: WTAQ-FM: 3,000 watts
- HAAT: WTAQ-FM: 143 meters (469 ft)
- Transmitter coordinates: WTAQ: 44°25′51″N 88°4′51.4″W; WTAQ-FM: 44°24′21″N 88°0′19.4″W

Links
- Public license information: WTAQ: Public file; LMS; WTAQ-FM: Public file; LMS
- Webcast: Listen live
- Website: www.wtaq.com

WTAQ (1360 AM) and WTAQ-FM (97.5 FM) are conservative news/talk-formatted radio stations, licensed to Green Bay, Wisconsin (AM) and Glenmore, Wisconsin (FM), that serve the Green Bay and Appleton-Oshkosh areas. The stations are owned by Midwest Communications.

WTAQ's studios and newsroom are located on Bellevue St. in the Green Bay suburb of Bellevue. The station's AM transmitter is located on Lost Dauphin Road, near the Fox River in De Pere. WTAQ-FM's transmitter is located at the former WFRV-TV analog transmitter site on Scray's Hill, also in De Pere. WTAQ transmits with a power of 10 kilowatts daytime, 5 kilowatts nighttime. WTAQ-FM’s effective radiated power is 3 kilowatts.

== WTAQ history ==
WTAQ was originally licensed to Osseo, Wisconsin, on September 4, 1923, on 1180 kHz to C.S. Van Gorden. In February 1926, he announced intentions to move the station from Osseo to Eau Claire and place it inside the plant of the Gillette Safety Tire Company (Gilette Rubber Company) in that city. The studio was located in the plant's cafeteria. The new station, a part-timer, went online from inside the plant on March 1, 1926; Van Gorden stayed on as station manager. The Norbertine Fathers of St. Norbert College in De Pere, then-owners of WHBY, bought the station in January 1935, and changed its city of license to Green Bay. The FCC granted the Green Bay-based WTAQ unlimited broadcast hours, which the Gillette company was never able to acquire in Eau Claire, and this was a major reason quoted by the company for its sale to St. Norbert's. WTAQ was off the air for several months as new facilities were built. The opening of the Green Bay station, on 1330 kHz, occurred on February 9, 1936. Its frequency was later moved to 1360 on March 29, 1941, as part of a massive set of AM station frequency shifts mandated by the FCC and contemporarily called "Radio Movin' Day". On June 20, 1949, the callsign was changed to WBAY, corresponding with their television station and FM station, with the WTAQ calls moving to a station launched in 1950 in La Grange, Illinois. WBAY was an early affiliate of the CBS Radio Network, as was WBAY-TV with the CBS Television Network.

In the mid-1970s, the Norbertine Fathers sold their broadcast properties including WBAY, WBAY-FM (now WIXX), WHBY and WBAY-TV. WHBY and WBAY-TV would go to unrelated owners, while WBAY and WBAY-FM were sold to Midwest Communications. On September 1, 1975, WBAY's callsign was changed to WGEE and the FM station's call became WIXX. Midwest also changed the station's network news affiliation to ABC.

For many years after the sale, WGEE played country music as well as local news, ABC network news, and agriculture reports. Due to the declining popularity of music on the AM band, the station began a gradual move towards news/talk programming in 1996. The station's moniker became "News Radio 1360 WGEE". Music programming, apart from WGEE's Sunday morning polka programs, was completely gone from the station by the end of 1998.

Former WGEE logo

In the year 2000, the nationally syndicated Rush Limbaugh Show moved to WGEE from sister station WNFL, which switched to a hot talk format. WNFL now carries a sports format. WNFL's affiliation with CBS also moved back to WGEE. The CBS affiliation would go back to WNFL, once again, when WTAQ picked up Fox News Radio on April 1, 2009.

WTAQ's logo prior to the start of the FM simulcast

In 2003, the historic WTAQ calls became available and WGEE decided to bring them back. The official change took place on March 17. Midwest Communications gave the WGEE calls to their ESPN Radio affiliate in Duluth, Minnesota, and would in 2014 apply them to its station in New London, Wisconsin when it converted to a classic country format (as WGEE-FM, dropping the -FM suffix in 2015).

== WTAQ-FM history ==
former logo

The original WTAQ-FM began broadcasting August 16, 1948, on 102.5 MHz with 14 kilowatts of power.

A construction permit was granted in 2008 to Radioactive, LLC to build a class A FM facility, licensed to Two Rivers as WTRW. The station was on the air briefly, mainly for testing. Its frequency was to be 97.1 MHz, but Radioactive applied to have the city of license changed to the Town of Glenmore, with it moving to 97.5 MHz. A deal was struck with WHDG in Rhinelander, which moved to 97.3 MHz, freeing up the 97.5 frequency for use in Glenmore in July 2009.

In fall 2008 Midwest Communications began negotiations with Radioactive about buying the construction permit. The sale was finalized on July 29, 2009, with Midwest paying $1.55 million for the station. The WTAQ-FM call letters were applied to the station on August 5, 2009.

In the August 3, 2009, edition of the Green Bay Press-Gazette, Midwest Communications President Duke Wright announced that 97.5 would change its call letters to WTAQ-FM and primarily simulcast WTAQ, once it signed on.

WTAQ-FM officially signed on at 4:10 p.m. on February 5, 2010, with Sean Hannity being the first voice on the station.

== Programming ==
WTAQ airs mainly nationally syndicated conservative talk shows hosted by Joe Giganti, Clay Travis and Buck Sexton, Markley, Van Camp, and Robbins, Mark Levin, and Glenn Beck (weekends). The station also has a local morning show hosted by Matt Z and Rob Sussman, called The Morning News. Other programs that air on the station include Coast to Coast AM with George Noory, First Light with Michael Toscano, The Kim Komando Show, Moneytalk with Bob Brinker, and The Allen Hunt Show.

WTAQ is an affiliate of Fox News Radio, airing their national newscasts as well as audio from Fox within WTAQ's locally originated newscasts. Business news from The Wall Street Journal can be heard weekday mornings and afternoons on the station. Green Bay formerly had no traffic reporting presence to speak of, but as traffic tracking technology was built up in the area by WISDot and other private companies, Midwest's stations, including WTAQ carry traffic reports several times an hour through rush hour, usually through scripts read by on-air personalities.

WTAQ has a news-sharing agreement with Fox affiliate WLUK-TV (channel 11) (and airs their local weather forecasts) and radio stations WTMJ in Milwaukee, WHBL in Sheboygan, and WSAU in Wausau. These stations collaborate to provide statewide news coverage and share audio and other resources.

In addition to WTAQ's news and talk programming, the station is an affiliate of the Milwaukee Brewers play-by-play broadcasts, which are produced by WTMJ.

In 2004, the station added a mid-morning local issues-based talk show hosted by Jerry Bader, who had come from new sister station, WHBL in Sheboygan, where he had been news director through the 1980s and most of the 1990s until the 2000 purchase of WHBL by Midwest. Under new management, WHBL went from a full-service format to a conservative talk format matching that of WTAQ, and Bader was groomed into a political talk show host. WHBL continued to carry the WTAQ version of the show live, along with WSAU in Wausau, and Bader also had the title of program director for WTAQ. Bader was let go from the station after his February 8, 2018, program, claiming that his "never Trump" political stance had caused friction with station management. John Muir was named the new host of the program in April 2018, which he held until June 2020, with "Regular Joe" Giganti as his replacement.

== WTAQ personalities ==
- Rob Sussman: Host of "The Morning News"
- Rachel Charniak: Anchor/Reporter
- Pete Petoniak: Morning weather (from WLUK-TV)
- Patrick Powell: Afternoon and evening weather (from WLUK-TV)
- Phil DeCastro: Weather forecasts (from WLUK-TV)
- Matt Zee: Host of "The Morning News"
- Joe Giganti: Host of "The Regular Joe Show"
- Steve Schroeder: Host of "The Steve Schroeder Show"

== Controversy ==
On October 29, 2009, Jerry Bader served a two-week suspension for making unsubstantiated accusations against Lieutenant Governor Barbara Lawton in a blog post.
