= KCRE-FM =

Radio station in Crescent City, California

- Crescent City, California; United States
- Frequency: 94.3 MHz
- Branding: KCRE 94.3

Programming
- Format: Adult contemporary
- Affiliations: Westwood One

Ownership
- Owner: Bicoastal Media Licenses Ii, LLC

History
- First air date: 1980
- Call sign meaning: Crescent City

Technical information
- Licensing authority: FCC
- Facility ID: 52106
- Class: C3
- ERP: 25,000 watts
- HAAT: −47 meters (−154 ft)
- Transmitter coordinates: 41°45′35″N 124°11′28″W

Links
- Public license information: Public file; LMS
- Webcast: Listen live
- Website: kcrefm.com

KCRE-FM (94.3 FM) is a radio station broadcasting an adult contemporary format licensed to Crescent City, California, United States. The station is owned by Bicoastal Media Licenses Ii, LLC and features programming from Westwood One, via the Hits & Favorites satellite radio service.
