= WBAD =

Radio station in Leland, Mississippi

- Leland, Mississippi; United States
- Broadcast area: Greenville, Mississippi and The Mississippi Delta area
- Frequency: 94.3 MHz
- Branding: 94.3 W BAD FM

Programming
- Format: Urban

Ownership
- Owner: Toney Baldwin; (TBTS Broadcasting, LLC)

Technical information
- Licensing authority: FCC
- Facility ID: 28876
- Class: C2
- ERP: 50 kW
- HAAT: 88 meters (289 ft)
- Transmitter coordinates: 33°24′55″N 90°59′18″W

Links
- Public license information: Public file; LMS
- Website: wbad-fm.tripod.com

Two radio stations used the call letters WBAD.

WBAD (94.3 FM) is a radio station broadcasting an Urban music format. Licensed to Leland, Mississippi, United States, the station is currently owned by Toney Baldwin, through licensee TBTS Broadcasting, LLC.

Another WBAD was an FM pirate (legally unauthorized) radio station broadcasting from Brooklyn's Windsor Terrace neighborhood from 1995–1998. WBAD-Bad Radio was founded by Dave Cintron (DJ Cintronics). They played uncensored hip-hop music, in contrast to "Hot97 "WQHT. NYC's licensed commercial Hip Hop station.
