= KJVA-LP =

- San Bernardino, California; United States
- Broadcast area: Inland Empire
- Frequency: 94.3 MHz

Programming
- Format: Contemporary Christian

Ownership
- Owner: Vida Abundante

Technical information
- Licensing authority: FCC
- Facility ID: 124517
- Class: L1
- ERP: 100 watts
- HAAT: −66 meters (−217 ft)
- Transmitter coordinates: 34°09′32″N 117°18′52″W
- Translator: 106.3 K292GN (San Bernardino)

Links
- Public license information: LMS
- Website: radiovidaabundante.com

KJVA-LP (94.3 FM) is a radio station broadcasting a contemporary Christian format. Licensed to San Bernardino, California, United States, it serves the Inland Empire area. The station is currently owned by Vida Abundante.
