= KPOP (FM) =

Radio station in Hartshorne, Oklahoma, US

- Hartshorne, Oklahoma; United States
- Frequency: 94.3 MHz (HD Radio)
- Branding: Hope Radio 94.3

Programming
- Format: Contemporary Christian (stunting with Christmas music)
- Subchannels: HD2: Country/Southern gospel "Faith 100.3"

Ownership
- Owner: Heartbeat Oklahoma LLC

Technical information
- Licensing authority: FCC
- Facility ID: 190388
- Class: A
- ERP: 400 watts
- HAAT: 40 metres (130 ft)
- Transmitter coordinates: 34°50′10″N 95°32′43″W
- Translator: HD2: 100.3 K262CS (McAlester)

Links
- Public license information: Public file; LMS
- Webcast: Listen Live

KPOP (94.3 FM) is a radio station licensed to serve the community of Hartshorne, Oklahoma. The station is owned John Jason Bennett’s Pittsburg Broadcast Assets. It airs a contemporary Christian format, but is currently stunting with Christmas music.

The station was assigned the KPOP call letters by the Federal Communications Commission on August 14, 2015.

The translator at 100.3 FM is called "Faith 100.3". Format is country and Southern gospel music.

In early October 2026, owners Nancy and Mark Fitzgerald (dba Heartbeat Oklahoma) sold KPOP and its translator back to its previous owner, John Jason Bennett, who had originally sold the station to the Fitzgeralds in 2017. KPOP immediately began stunting with Christmas music.

== Translator ==
Broadcast translator for KPOP-HD2
Call sign	Frequency	City of license	FID	ERP (W)	HAAT	Class	FCC info
K262CS	100.3 FM	McAlester, Oklahoma	143582	250	10 m (33 ft)	D	LMS
