= KDAM =

Coordinates: 42.730°N 97.404°W

- Hartington, Nebraska; United States
- Broadcast area: Yankton-Vermillion
- Frequency: 94.3 MHz
- Branding: Current 94.3

Programming
- Format: Hot adult contemporary

Ownership
- Owner: Riverfront Broadcasting LLC

History
- First air date: 2010
- Call sign meaning: The DAM (former branding)

Technical information
- Licensing authority: FCC
- Facility ID: 183348
- Class: C2
- ERP: 50,000 watts
- HAAT: 103 meters (338 ft)

Links
- Public license information: Public file; LMS
- Webcast: Listen Live
- Website: current943.com

KDAM (94.3 FM) is a hot adult contemporary radio station serving Yankton and Vermillion, South Dakota area that is licensed to Hartington, Nebraska. KDAM is owned and operated by Riverfront Broadcasting LLC.

== History ==
The Dam's logo

KDAM began broadcasting in 2010, and originally aired an active rock format branded "the Dam". In 2017, the station adopted a hot AC format branded "Current 94.3", while "the Dam's" active rock format continued to stream online.
