= KRKZ-FM =

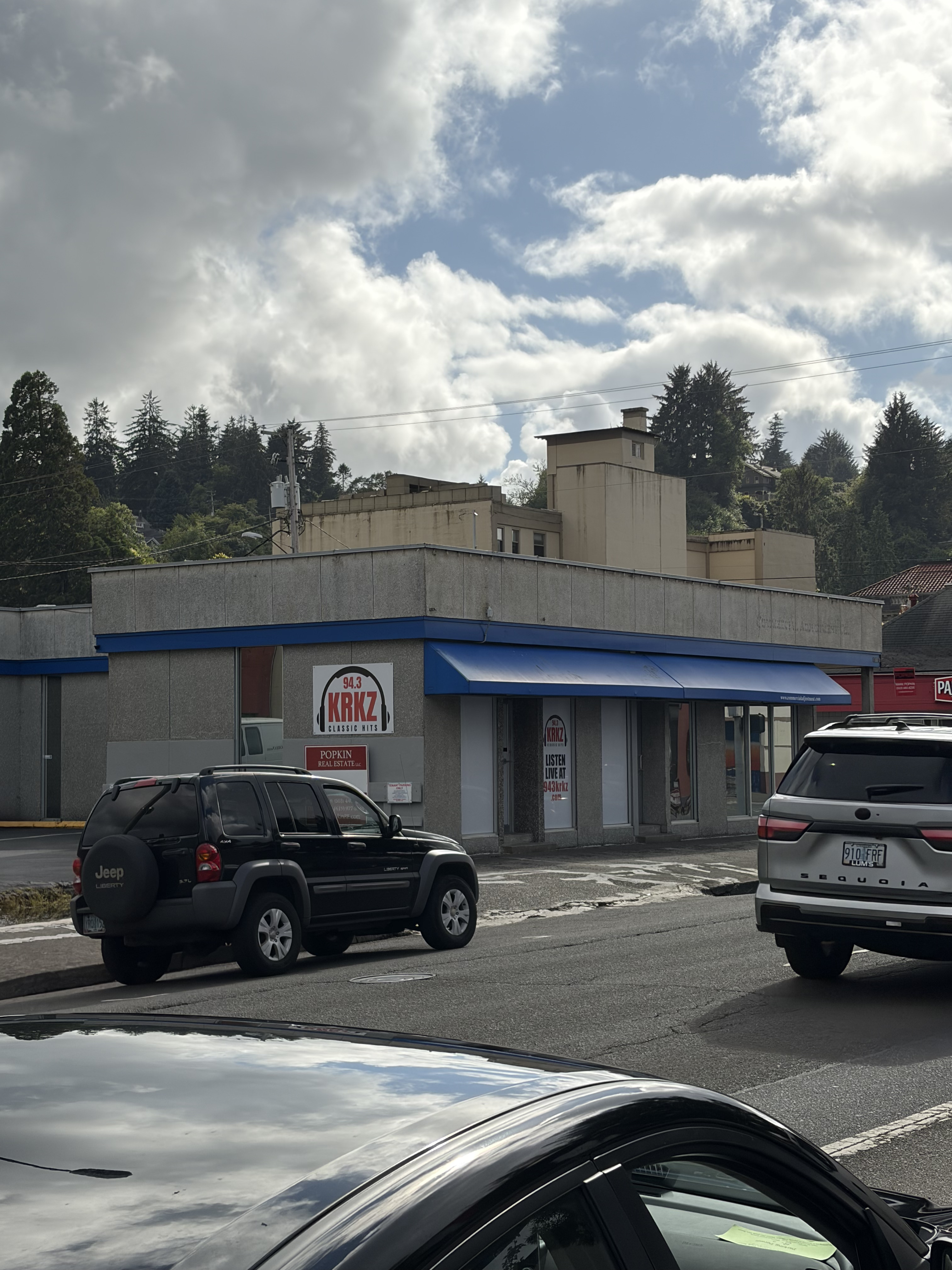
- KRKZ-FM office in Astoria, Oregon.
- Chinook, Washington; United States
- Broadcast area: Astoria, Oregon
- Frequency: 94.3 MHz
- Branding: 94.3 KRKZ

Programming
- Format: Classic hits

Ownership
- Owner: Meadows Broadcasting, LLC

History
- First air date: August 25, 2011

Technical information
- Licensing authority: FCC
- Facility ID: 189499
- Class: A
- ERP: 400 watts
- HAAT: 380 meters (1,250 ft)
- Transmitter coordinates: 46°17′12″N 123°53′46″W

Links
- Public license information: Public file; LMS
- Webcast: Listen live
- Website: www.943krkz.com

KRKZ-FM is a radio station licensed to Chinook, Washington, serving the North Oregon and SW Washington coasts with a classic hits format.

On August 12, 2024, KRKZ-FM changed their format from top 40/CHR to classic hits.
