= KBDB-FM =

Radio station in Forks, Washington

Coordinates: 48.129522°N 124.305493°W

- Forks, Washington; United States
- Frequency: 96.7 MHz (HD Radio)
- Branding: Twilight 96.7

Programming
- Format: Adult contemporary
- Subchannels: HD3: Forks Talk (talk); HD4: Soul Duck

Ownership
- Owner: Mark Lamb; (Forks Broadcasting Inc.)

History
- First air date: 1987 (as KLLM at 103.9)
- Former call signs: KLLM (1981–2005)
- Former frequencies: 103.9 MHz (1987–2009)

Technical information
- Licensing authority: FCC
- Facility ID: 28208
- Class: C3
- ERP: 930 watts
- HAAT: 484 metres (1,588 feet)

Links
- Public license information: Public file; LMS
- Webcast: Twilight 96.7 Listen live]; HD3: Listen live

KBDB-FM is an American radio station licensed to operate on the FM frequency of 96.7 MHz. Licensed to Forks, Washington,. the station is owned by Forks Broadcasting Inc. it broadcasts an adult contemporary format. KBDB-FM is the only commercial radio station serving the West End of Clallam County, Washington. The studios are at 260 Cedar Avenue in Forks.

The station's transmitter was located next to the studios until early 2016. Because of its low-lying position in relation to the surrounding mountainous terrain—the antenna was 23 meters (75 ft) below average terrain—the 6,000-watt Class A signal barely reached beyond the valley. In the spring of 2016, KBDB-FM began broadcasting a Class C3 signal from a mountaintop transmitter located approximately 5.5 kilometers (3.4 mi) north-northwest of Sappho.
