= WIWU-LP =

Marion, Indiana; United States
- Broadcast area: East-central Indiana
- Frequency: 94.3 MHz

Programming
- Format: Christian CHR

Ownership
- Owner: Indiana Wesleyan University

History
- First air date: 2002
- Former call signs: WCWC-LP (2001–2007)
- Call sign meaning: Indiana Wesleyan University

Technical information
- Licensing authority: FCC
- Facility ID: 123734
- Class: L1
- ERP: 100 watts
- HAAT: 25.4 meters (83 ft)
- Transmitter coordinates: 40°31′15.00″N 85°39′59.00″W

Links
- Public license information: LMS
- Website: wiwu.fm

WIWU-LP (94.3 FM) is a radio station licensed to Marion, Indiana, United States. The station is owned by Indiana Wesleyan University.

== History ==
The station was assigned the call sign WCWC-LP on June 26, 2001. On July 17, 2007, the station changed its call sign to the current WIWU-LP.

The station is completely operated and managed by students at Indiana Wesleyan University. Any student at IWU is allowed and encouraged to gain the experience of having a weekly radio show.

WIWU features several specialty shows including Studio 214, a community-focused talk show; Fortress Throwbacks, a classic contemporary Christian/hard rock show; and Soul Food, a black gospel show.
