= KSHD-LP =

Shady Cove, Oregon; United States
- Frequency: 94.3 MHz
- Branding: K-Shady

Programming
- Format: Variety

Ownership
- Owner: City of Shady Cove, Oregon

History
- First air date: 2007
- Former frequencies: 99.1 (2007–2015)

Technical information
- Licensing authority: FCC
- Facility ID: 134026
- Class: L1
- ERP: 100 watts
- HAAT: −156 meters (−512 ft)
- Transmitter coordinates: 42°37′24.2″N 122°48′33.5″W

Links
- Public license information: LMS

KSHD-LP (94.3 FM, "K-Shady") is a low-power radio station broadcasting a Variety music format. Licensed to Shady Cove, Oregon, United States, the station is currently owned by City of Shady Cove.
