= Bellevue, Wisconsin =

- Village
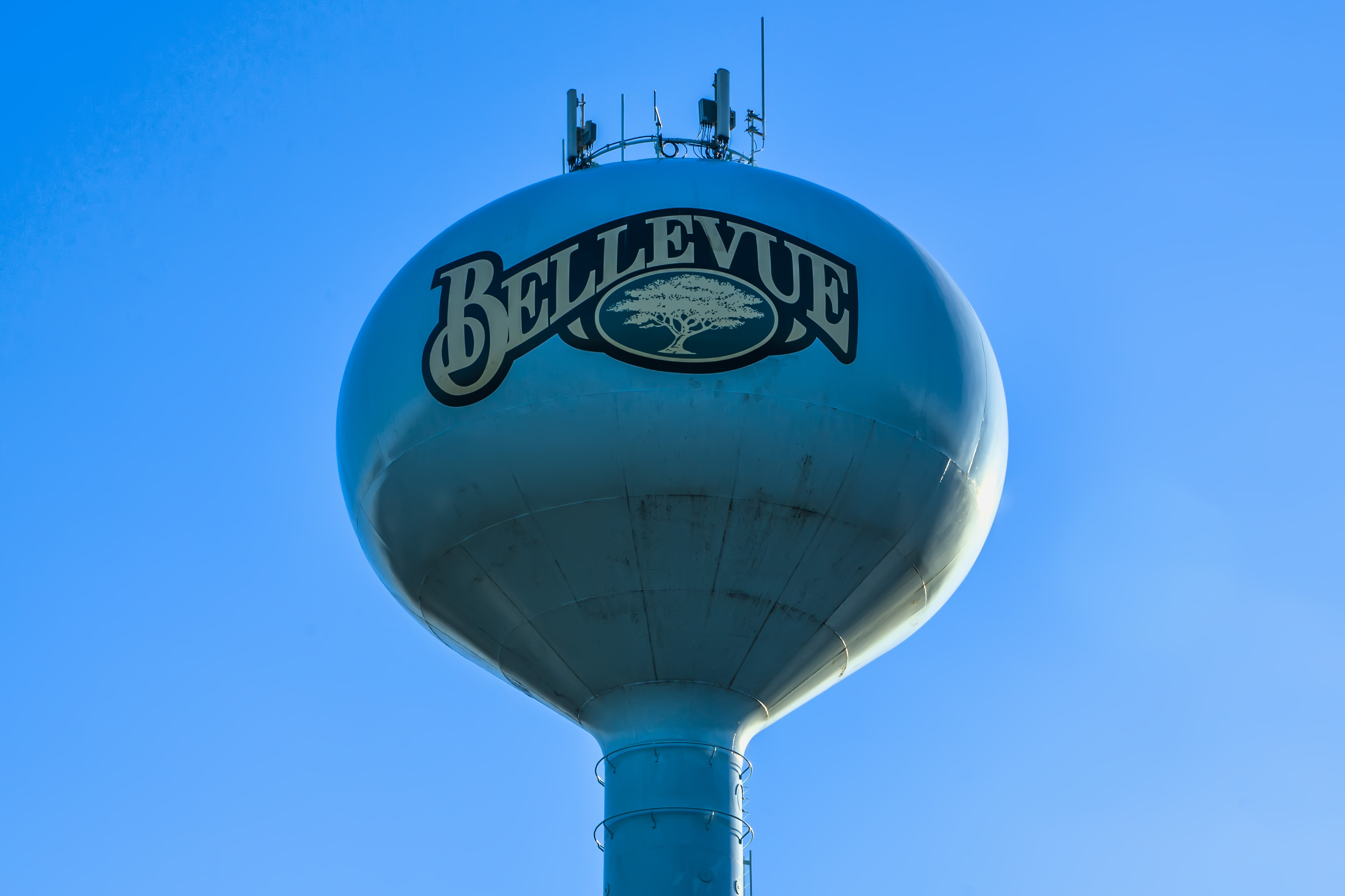
- Bellevue water tower

- Location of Bellevue in Brown County, Wisconsin

- Location within Wisconsin Location within the United States
- Coordinates: 44°27′33″N 87°59′18″W
- Country: United States
- State: Wisconsin
- County: Brown

Area
  - Total: 14.38 sq mi (37.25 km^{2})
  - Land: 14.33 sq mi (37.11 km^{2})
  - Water: 0.054 sq mi (0.14 km^{2})
- Elevation: 679 ft (207 m)

Population (2020)
  - Total: 15,935
  - Density: 1,108.0/sq mi (427.79/km^{2})
- Time zone: UTC-6 (Central (CST))
  - Summer (DST): UTC-5 (CDT)
- Area code: 920
- FIPS code: 55-06350
- GNIS feature ID: 2013446
- Website: www.villageofbellevuewi.gov

Bellevue is a village in Brown County, Wisconsin, United States. The population was 15,935 at the time of the 2020 census. It is a suburb of Green Bay and is part of the Green Bay metropolitan area, around 4 miles (6.4 km) east from Green Bay.

== History ==
Initially settled circa 1850 by German immigrants, the township was originally named Manitou. Local residents Harry E. Eastman and Judge David Agry renamed it Belleview (overtime the name's spelling was changed to its current form).

Bellevue was named for the French words meaning "beautiful view". It was a town until incorporating as a village on February 14, 2003.

== Geography ==
According to the United States Census Bureau, the village has a total area of 14.40 square miles (37.30 km^{2}), of which 14.34 square miles (37.14 km^{2}) is land and 0.05 square miles (0.13 km^{2}) is water.

=== Climate ===
Bellevue

Climate chart (precipitation, max. and min. temperature)
J	F	M	A	M	J	J	A	S	O	N	D
62 −9 −13	62 −7 −11	66 1 −7	141 15 1	105 20 5	106 25 13	108 26 16	88 25 16	72 20 11	121 14 5	68 4 −2	61 −5 −9
- █ Average max. and min. temperatures in °C
- █ Precipitation totals in mm
Imperial conversion
J	F	M	A	M	J	J	A	S	O	N	D
2.4 16 9	2.4 19 12	2.6 34 19	5.6 59 34	4.1 68 41	4.2 77 55	4.3 79 61	3.5 77 61	2.8 68 52	4.8 57 41	2.7 39 28	2.4 23 16
- █ Average max. and min. temperatures in °F
- █ Precipitation totals in inches

== Demographics ==
Historical population
Census	Pop.	Note	%±
1990	7,541		—
2000	11,828		56.8%
2010	14,570		23.2%
2020	15,935		9.4%
U.S. Decennial Census

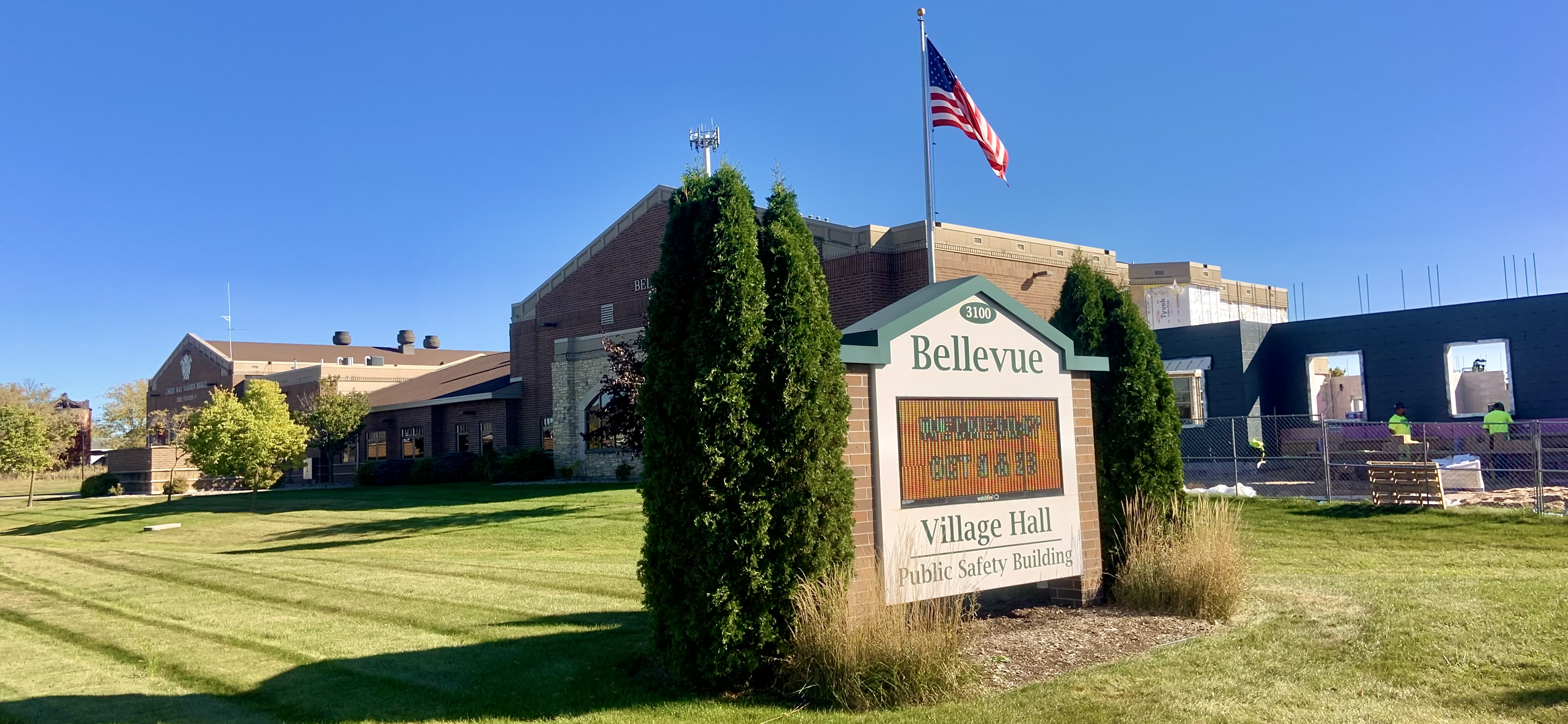
Bellevue Village Hall

=== 2020 census ===
As of the 2020 census, Bellevue had a population of 15,935. The population density was 1,108.1 inhabitants per square mile (427.8/km^{2}). The median age was 40.9 years. 21.2% of residents were under the age of 18 and 18.5% of residents were 65 years of age or older. For every 100 females there were 96.5 males, and for every 100 females age 18 and over there were 93.3 males age 18 and over.

98.0% of residents lived in urban areas, while 2.0% lived in rural areas.

There were 6,923 households in Bellevue, of which 25.5% had children under the age of 18 living in them. Of all households, 49.2% were married-couple households, 17.1% were households with a male householder and no spouse or partner present, and 25.3% were households with a female householder and no spouse or partner present. About 30.8% of all households were made up of individuals and 13.1% had someone living alone who was 65 years of age or older.

There were 7,280 housing units, of which 4.9% were vacant. The homeowner vacancy rate was 1.8% and the rental vacancy rate was 5.5%.

Racial composition as of the 2020 census
Race	Number	Percent
White	12,839	80.6%
Black or African American	190	1.2%
American Indian and Alaska Native	168	1.1%
Asian	788	4.9%
Native Hawaiian and Other Pacific Islander	0	0.0%
Some other race	891	5.6%
Two or more races	1,059	6.6%
Hispanic or Latino (of any race)	1,740	10.9%

=== 2010 census ===
As of the 2010 census, there were 14,570 people, 5,876 households, and 3,883 families living in the village. The population density was 1,016.0 inhabitants per square mile (392.3/km^{2}). There were 6,314 housing units at an average density of 440.3 per square mile (170.0/km^{2}). The racial makeup of the village was 87.5% White, 1.0% African American, 0.9% Native American, 3.9% Asian, 4.9% from other races, and 1.9% from two or more races. Hispanic or Latino people of any race were 9.3% of the population.

There were 5,876 households, of which 33.7% had children under the age of 18 living with them, 53.5% were married couples living together, 9.0% had a female householder with no husband present, 3.7% had a male householder with no wife present, and 33.9% were non-families. 26.5% of all households were made up of individuals, and 9.4% had someone living alone who was 65 years of age or older. The average household size was 2.48 and the average family size was 3.04.

The median age in the village was 36.3 years. 25.8% of residents were under the age of 18; 8.3% were between the ages of 18 and 24; 27.5% were from 25 to 44; 27.4% were from 45 to 64; and 10.9% were 65 years of age or older. The gender makeup of the village was 48.7% male and 51.3% female.

=== 2000 census ===
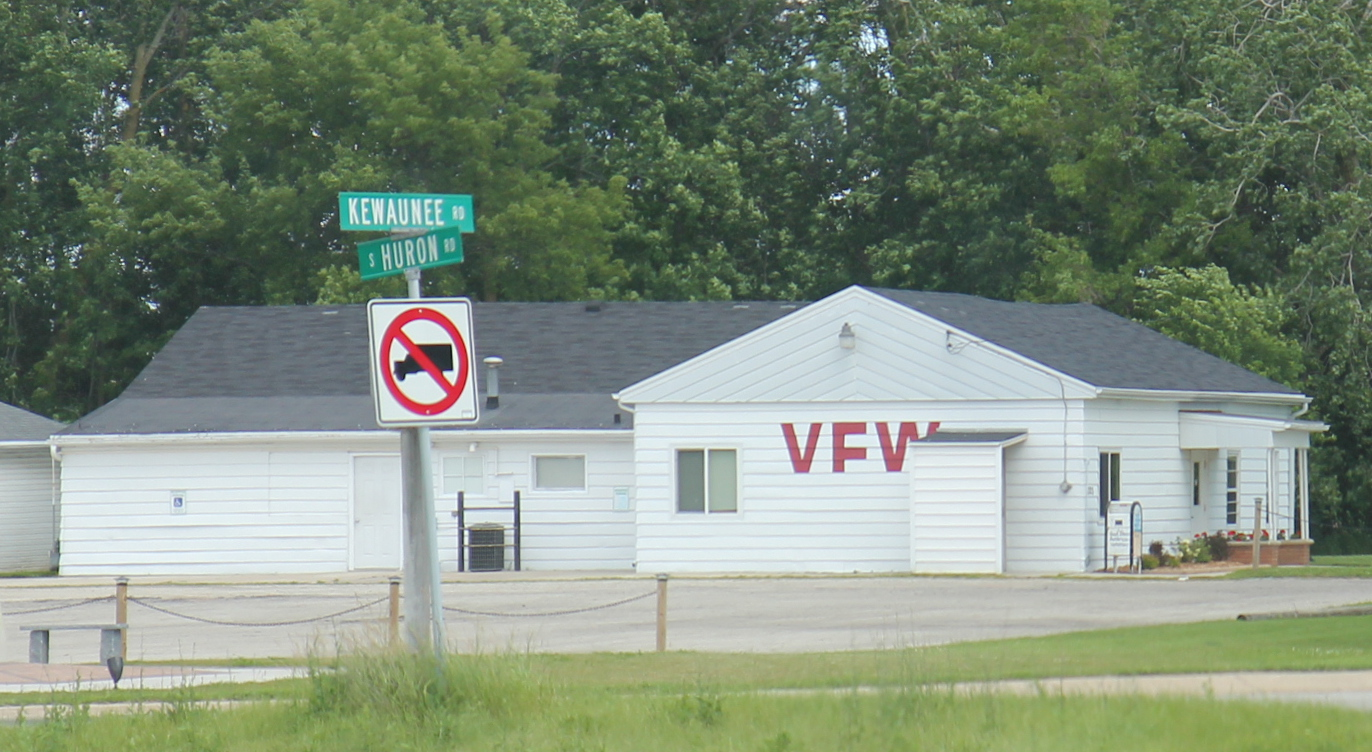
Bellevue VFW post 9677

As of the 2000 census, there were 11,828 people, 4,624 households, and 3,111 families living in the village. The population density was 829.0 people per square mile (320.0/km^{2}). There were 4,759 housing units at an average density of 333.5 per square mile (128.8/km^{2}). The racial makeup of the village was 95.40% White, 0.51% African American, 0.84% Native American, 1.35% Asian, 0.02% Pacific Islander, 1.10% from other races, and 0.79% from two or more races. Hispanic or Latino people of any race were 2.62% of the population.

There were 4,624 households, out of which 36.7% had children under the age of 18 living with them, 56.2% were married couples living together, 7.6% had a female householder with no husband present, and 32.7% were non-families. 23.1% of all households were made up of individuals, and 4.3% had someone living alone who was 65 years of age or older. The average household size was 2.54 and the average family size was 3.08.

In the village, the population was spread out, with 26.9% under the age of 18, 9.6% from 18 to 24, 36.1% from 25 to 44, 20.2% from 45 to 64, and 7.2% who were 65 years of age or older. The median age was 33 years. For every 100 females, there were 98.1 males. For every 100 females age 18 and over, there were 97.1 males.

The median income for a household in the village was $53,672, and the median income for a family was $62,299. Males had a median income of $40,194 versus $26,189 for females. The per capita income for the village was $24,283. About 3.3% of families and 4.2% of the population were below the poverty line, including 4.3% of those under age 18 and 9.6% of those age 65 or over.
