= List of radio stations owned by Cumulus Media =

The following is a list of radio stations owned by Cumulus Media. As of 2022, Cumulus owned and operated 404 stations in 85 markets. Cumulus Media stations are also available on online streaming services iHeartRadio and TuneIn. All stations are identified as "A Cumulus Media Station" during station identifications.

== Alabama ==
Birmingham

- WAPI – 1070 – Silent
- WJOX – 690 – Sports
- WJOX-FM – 94.5 – Sports
- WJQX – 100.5 — Sports
- WUHT – 107.7 – Urban adult contemporary
- WZRR – 99.5 – News/talk

Huntsville

- WHRP – 94.1 – Urban adult contemporary
- WUMP – 730/103.9 – Sports
- WVNN – 770 – News/talk
- WVNN-FM – 92.5 – News/talk (simulcast of WVNN)
- WZYP – 104.3 – Contemporary hit radio

Mobile

- WABD – 97.5 – Contemporary hit radio
- WBLX-FM – 92.9 – Urban contemporary
- WDLT-FM – 104.1 – Urban adult contemporary
- WGOK – 900 – Gospel
- WXQW – 660 – Sports

Montgomery

- WHHY-FM – 101.9 – Contemporary hit radio
- WLWI-FM – 92.3 – Country
- WMSP – 740 – Sports
- WMXS – 103.3 – Adult contemporary
- WXFX – 95.1 – Mainstream rock

== Arizona ==
Tucson

- KCUB – 1290 – Sports
- KHYT – 107.5 – Classic hits
- KIIM-FM – 99.5 – Country
- KSZR – 97.5 – Classic hip hop
- KTUC – 1400 – Talk radio

== Arkansas ==
Fayetteville

- KAMO-FM – 94.3 – Country/Nash Icon
- KFAY – 1030 – News/talk
- KKEG – 98.3 – Classic hits
- KMCK-FM – 105.7 – Contemporary hit radio
- KQSM-FM – 92.1 – Sports
- KRMW – 94.9 – Adult album alternative
- KYNG – 1590 – Sports

Fort Smith

- KBBQ-FM – 102.7 – Rhythmic contemporary
- KNSH – 100.7 – Country/Nash FM
- KOMS – 107.3 – Classic country

Little Rock

- KAAY – 1090 – Brokered/Christian
- KARN – 920 – Silent
- KARN-FM – 102.9 – News/talk
- KFOG – 1250 – Urban contemporary (simulcast of KIPR)
- KIPR – 92.3 – Urban contemporary
- KLAL – 107.7 – Contemporary hit radio
- KURB – 98.5 – Adult contemporary

== California ==
Fresno

- KMGV – 97.9 – Rhythmic oldies
- KMJ – 580 – News/talk
- KMJ-FM – 105.9 – News/talk (simulcast of KMJ)
- KSKS – 93.7 – Country
- KWYE – 101.1 – Hot adult contemporary

Los Angeles

- KABC – 790 – News/talk

Oxnard/Ventura

- KBBY-FM – 95.1 – Adult contemporary
- KHAY – 100.7 – Country
- KRUZ – 103.3 – Classic hits
- KVYB – 106.3 – Oldies

San Francisco

- KNBR – 680 – Sports
- KNBR-FM – 104.5 – Sports (simulcast of KNBR 680)
- KSAN – 107.7 – Mainstream rock
- KSFO – 810 – Conservative talk
- KTCT – 1050 – Sports

Stockton/Modesto

- KATM – 103.3 – Country
- KDJK – 103.9 – Classic rock (simulcast of KHKK)
- KESP – 970 – Westwood One Sports Network
- KHKK – 104.1 – Classic rock
- KHOP – 95.1 – Contemporary Top 40
- KJOY – 99.3 – Adult contemporary
- KWIN – 97.7 – Urban contemporary
- KWNN - 98.3 - Urban contemporary (simulcast of KWIN)

== Colorado ==
Colorado Springs

- KATC-FM – 95.1/104.9 – Country
- KCSF – 1300 – Sports
- KKFM – 98.1 – Classic rock
- KKMG – 98.9 – Contemporary hit radio
- KKPK – 92.9 – Adult contemporary
- KVOR – 740 – News/talk

== Connecticut ==
New London

- WMOS – 102.3 – Classic rock (operated by Mohegan Sun)
- WQGN-FM – 105.5 – Contemporary hit radio
- WXLM – 980 – News/talk

== District of Columbia ==
Washington

- WMAL-FM – 105.9 – News/talk
- WSBN – 630 – Sports

== Florida ==
Fort Walton Beach

- WFTW – 1260/107.5 – Silent
- WKSM – 99.5 – Mainstream rock
- WNCV – 93.3 – Adult contemporary
- WYZB – 105.5 – Country
- WZNS – 96.5 – Contemporary hit radio

Melbourne

- WAOA-FM – 107.1 – Contemporary hit radio
- WHKR – 102.7 – Country
- WROK-FM – 95.9 – Classic rock

Pensacola

- WCOA – 1370/104.9 – News/talk
- WJTQ – 100.7 – Classic hits
- WMEZ – 94.1 – Rhythmic contemporary
- WRRX – 106.1 – Urban adult contemporary
- WXBM-FM – 102.7 – Country

Tallahassee

- WBZE – 98.9 – Adult contemporary
- WGLF – 104.1 – Classic hits
- WHBX – 96.1 – Urban adult contemporary
- WWLD – 102.3 – Urban contemporary
- WWLD-HD2 – 98.3 – Gospel

== Georgia ==
Atlanta

- WKHX-FM – 101.5 – Country
- WNNX – 100.5 – Classic Alternative
- WWWQ – 99.7 – Contemporary hit radio
- WWWQ-HD2 — 98.9 – Classic hip hop

Macon

- WDEN-FM – 99.1 – Country
- WLZN – 92.3 – Urban contemporary
- WMAC – 940 – News/talk
- WMGB – 95.1 – Contemporary hit radio
- WPEZ – 93.7 – Adult contemporary

Savannah

- WEAS-FM – 93.1 – Urban contemporary
- WIXV – 95.5 – Classic rock
- WJCL-FM – 96.5 – Country
- WTYB – 103.9 – Urban adult contemporary

== Idaho ==
Boise

- KBOI – 670 – News/talk
- KBOI-FM - 93.1 - News/talk (Simulcast of KBOI)
- KIZN – 92.3 – Country
- KKGL – 96.9 – Classic rock
- KQFC – 97.9 – Soft adult contemporary
- KTIK – 1350/95.3 – Sports

== Illinois ==
Bloomington

- WBNQ – 101.5 – Contemporary hit radio
- WBWN – 104.1 – Country
- WJBC – 1230/102.1 – News/talk
- WJEZ – 98.9 – Classic hits

Chicago

- WKQX – 101.1 – Alternative rock
- WLS – 890 – News/talk
- WLS-FM – 94.7 – Classic hits

Peoria

- WFYR – 97.3 – Country
- WGLO – 95.5 – Classic rock
- WIXO – 105.7 – Active rock
- WVEL – 1140 – Urban contemporary gospel
- WZPW – 92.3 – Rhythmic contemporary

== Indiana ==
Indianapolis

- WFMS – 95.5 – Country
- WJJK – 104.5 – Classic hits
- WNDX – 93.9 – Mainstream rock
- WNTR — 107.9 — Adult contemporary
- WXNT — 1430 — Infinity Sports Network
- WZPL — 99.5 — Contemporary hit radio

Kokomo

- WWKI – 100.5 – Country

Muncie

- WMDH-FM – 102.5 – Country/Nash FM

== Iowa ==
Des Moines

- KGGO – 94.9 – Classic rock
- KHKI – 97.3 – Country/Nash FM
- KJJY – 92.5 – Country
- KWQW – 98.3 – Contemporary hit radio

== Kansas ==
Kansas City

- KCFX – 101.1 – Classic rock
- KCHZ – 95.7 – News/talk (Simulcast of KCMO)
- KCJK – 105.1 – Contemporary hit radio
- KCMO – 710/103.7 – News/talk
- KCMO-FM – 94.9 – Classic hits
- KCMO-FM-HD2 – 102.5 – Adult hits/Jack FM
- KMJK – 107.3 – Adult hits/Jack FM

Topeka

- KDVV – 100.3 – Classic rock
- KMAJ – 1440/93.5 – Talk radio
- KMAJ-FM – 107.7 – Adult contemporary
- KTOP – 1490 – Westwood One Sports Network
- KTOP-FM – 102.9 – News/talk (Simulcast of KCMO)
- KWIC – 99.3 – Classic hits

== Kentucky ==
Lexington

- WLTO – 102.5 – Contemporary hit radio
- WLXX – 101.5 – Silent
- WVLK – 590/97.3 – News/talk
- WVLK-FM – 92.9 – Country
- WXZZ – 103.3 – Active rock

== Louisiana ==
Baton Rouge

- KQXL-FM – 106.5 – Urban adult contemporary
- WEMX – 94.1 – Urban contemporary
- WRQQ – 103.3 – Classic hits
- WXOK – 1460/95.7 – Gospel

Lafayette

- KNEK-FM – 104.7 – Urban adult contemporary
- KRRQ – 95.5 – Urban contemporary
- KSMB – 94.5 – Contemporary hit radio
- KXKC – 99.1 – Classic country

Lake Charles

- KAOK – 1400 – News/talk
- KBIU – 103.3 – Contemporary hit radio
- KKGB – 101.3 – Classic rock
- KQLK – 97.9 – Country/Nash Icon
- KYKZ – 96.1 – Country

New Orleans

- KKND – 106.7 – Gospel
- KMEZ – 102.9 – Urban adult contemporary
- WRKN – 106.1 – Sports
- WZRH – 92.3 – Alternative rock

Shreveport

- KMJJ-FM – 99.7 – Urban contemporary
- KQHN – 97.3 – Hot adult contemporary
- KRMD-FM – 101.1 – Country
- KVMA-FM – 102.9 – Urban adult contemporary

== Massachusetts ==
Worcester

- WORC-FM – 98.9 – Country/Nash Icon
- WWFX – 100.1 – Classic rock
- WXLO – 104.5 – Hot adult contemporary

== Michigan ==
Ann Arbor

- WLBY – 1290 – Business talk
- WQKL – 107.1 – Adult album alternative
- WTKA – 1050 – Sports
- WWWW-FM – 102.9 – Country

Detroit

- WDVD – 96.3 – Hot adult contemporary
- WJR – 760 – News/talk

Flint

- WDZZ-FM – 92.7 – Urban adult contemporary
- WFBE – 95.1 – Country
- WWCK – 1570 - Silent
- WWCK-FM – 105.5 – Contemporary hit radio

Grand Rapids

- WHTS – 105.3 – Contemporary hit radio
- WJRW – 1340/106.1 – Sports
- WKLQ – 94.5 – Adult album alternative
- WLAV-FM – 96.9 – Classic rock
- WTNR – 107.3 – Country

Muskegon

- WLCS – 98.3 – Classic hits
- WVIB – 100.1 – Urban adult contemporary
- WWSN – 92.5 – Adult contemporary

Saginaw

- WHNN – 96.1 – Adult contemporary
- WILZ – 104.5 – Classic rock
- WIOG – 102.5 – Contemporary hit radio
- WKQZ – 93.3 – Active rock

== Minnesota ==
Minneapolis

- KQRS-FM — 92.5 — Classic rock
- KXXR — 93.7 — Active rock
- WGVX — 105.1 — Soft adult contemporary
- WLUP — 105.3 — Soft adult contemporary (simulcast of WGVX)
- WWWM-FM — 105.7 — Soft adult contemporary (simulcast of WGVX)

== Mississippi ==
Columbus/Starkville

- WKOR-FM — 94.9 — Country/Nash FM
- WMXU — 106.1 — Urban adult contemporary
- WNMQ — 103.1 — Contemporary hit radio
- WSMS — 99.9 — Mainstream rock

== Missouri ==
Columbia/Jefferson City

- KBBM — 100.1 — Country/Nash FM
- KBXR – 102.3 – Adult album alternative
- KFRU – 1400/98.9 – News/talk
- KLIK – 1240/103.5 – Silent
- KOQL – 106.1 – Contemporary hit radio
- KPLA – 101.5 – Adult contemporary

== Nevada ==
Reno

- KBUL-FM — 98.1 — Country
- KKOH — 780 — News/talk
- KNEV — 95.5/99.3 — Classic hip hop
- KWYL — 102.9/106.1 — Rhythmic contemporary

== New Mexico ==
Albuquerque

- KDRF — 103.3 — Adult hits
- KKOB — 770 — News/talk (simulcast of KKOB-FM)
- KKOB-FM — 96.3 — News/talk
- KMGA — 99.5 — Adult contemporary
- KNML — 610/95.9 — Sports
- KOBQ — 93.3 — Contemporary hit radio
- KRST — 92.3 — Country
- KTBL — 1050/94.5 — Active rock

== New York ==
Buffalo

- WBBF — 1120/98.9 — Top 40 (CHR)
- WEDG – 103.3 – Alternative rock
- WGRF – 96.9 – Classic rock
- WHTT-FM – 104.1 – Classic hits

Syracuse

- WAQX-FM – 95.7 – Alternative rock
- WNTQ – 93.1 – Mainstream top 40
- WSKO – 1260 – Sports

== North Carolina ==
Fayetteville

- WFNC — 640 — News/talk
- WMGU — 106.9 — Urban adult contemporary
- WQSM — 98.1 — Top 40
- WRCQ — 103.5 — Mainstream rock

Wilmington

- WAAV — 980/107.9 — News/talk
- WGNI — 102.7 — Adult contemporary
- WKXS-FM — 94.5 — Classic rock
- WMNX — 97.3 — Urban contemporary
- WWQQ-FM — 101.3 — Country

== Ohio ==
Cincinnati

- WFTK – 96.5 – Active rock
- WGRR – 103.5 – Classic hits
- WNNF – 94.1 – Country
- WOFX-FM – 92.5 – Classic rock
- WRRM – 98.5 – Adult contemporary

Toledo/Monroe

- WKKO – 99.9 – Country
- WMIM – 98.3 – Country/Nash Icon
- WQQO – 105.5 – 90s/2000s hits
- WQQO-HD2 – 100.7 – Sports
- WRQN – 93.5 – Classic hits
- WXKR – 94.5 – Classic rock

Youngstown

- WBBW – 1240 – Sports
- WHOT-FM – 101.1 – Contemporary hit radio
- WPIC – 790 – News/talk
- WQXK – 105.1 – Country
- WRQX – 600 – Talk
- WYFM – 102.9 – Classic rock
- WWIZ – 103.9 – Sports

== Oklahoma ==
Oklahoma City

- KATT-FM — 100.5 — Mainstream rock
- KKWD — 104.9 — Adult Hits
- KWPN — 640 — ESPN Radio
- KYIS — 98.9 — Hot adult contemporary
- WKY — 930 — Sports Talk (simulcast with WWLS-FM)
- WWLS-FM — 98.1 — Sports Talk

== Oregon ==
Eugene

- KEHK — 102.3 — Adult top 40
- KNRQ — 103.7/98.5 — Alternative rock
- KUGN — 590/98.1 — News/talk
- KUJZ — 95.3 — Sports
- KZEL-FM — 96.1/96.7/99.3/102.1 — Classic rock

== Pennsylvania ==
Allentown/Bethlehem

- WCTO – 96.1 – Country
- WEEX - 1230 - Sports
- WLEV – 100.7 – Adult contemporary
- WODE-FM - 99.9 - Classic rock
- WWYY - 107.1 - Country (simulcast of WCTO)

Erie

- WQHZ – 102.3 – Classic rock
- WRIE – 1260/96.3 – Silent
- WXKC – 99.9 — Adult contemporary
- WXKC-HD2 — 104.3 — Urban AC
- WXTA – 97.9 – Country/Nash FM

Harrisburg

- WHGB – 1400/96.5/95.3 – Sports
- WNNK-FM – 104.1 – Hot adult contemporary
- WQXA-FM – 105.7 – Active rock
- WTPA-FM – 93.5 – Classic rock

Lancaster

- WIOV-FM – 105.1 – Country

Wilkes-Barre/Scranton

- WBHD - 95.7 - Contemporary hit radio
- WBHT – 97.1 – Contemporary hit radio
- WBSX – 97.9 – Active rock
- WMGS – 92.9 – Adult contemporary
- WSJR – 93.7 – Country/Nash FM

York

- WARM-FM – 103.3 – Adult contemporary
- WSBA – 910/93.9 – News/talk
- WSOX – 96.1 – Classic hits

== Rhode Island ==
Providence

- WEAN-FM — 99.7 — News/talk (simulcast of WPRO)
- WPRO — 630 — News/talk
- WPRO-FM — 92.3 — Mainstream top 40
- WPRV — 790 — Sports betting
- WWKX — 106.3 — Classic Rock
- WWLI — 105.1 — Adult contemporary

== South Carolina ==
Charleston

- WIWF — 96.9 — Classic hits
- WMGL — 107.3 — Urban adult contemporary
- WSSX-FM — 95.1 — Contemporary hit radio
- WTMA — 1250 — News/talk
- WWWZ — 93.3 — Mainstream urban

Columbia

- WLXC — 103.1 — Urban adult contemporary
- WNKT — 107.5 — Sports
- WOMG — 98.5 — Classic hits
- WTCB — 106.7 — Adult contemporary

Florence

- WBZF — 98.5 — Urban contemporary gospel
- WCMG — 94.3 — Urban adult contemporary
- WMXT — 102.1 — Classic hits
- WWFN-FM — 100.1 — Sports
- WYNN — 540 — Urban contemporary gospel (simulcast of WBZF)
- WYNN-FM — 106.3 — Mainstream urban

Myrtle Beach

- WAYS — 1050/101.9 — Silent
- WDAI — 98.5 — Urban contemporary
- WLFF — 106.5 — Country/Nash Icon
- WSEA — 100.3 — Sports
- WSYN — 103.1 — Classic hits

== Tennessee ==
Chattanooga

- WGOW – 1150 – News/talk
- WGOW-FM – 102.3 – Talk radio
- WOGT – 107.9 – Country
- WSKZ – 106.5 – Classic rock

Knoxville

- WIVK-FM – 107.7 – Country
- WNML – 990 – Sports
- WNML-FM – 99.1 – Sports (simulcast of WNML)
- WOKI – 98.7 – News/talk

Memphis

- WGKX – 105.9 – Country
- WKIM – 98.9 – News/talk
- WRBO – 103.5 – Urban adult contemporary
- WXMX – 98.1 – Mainstream rock

Nashville

- WGFX – 104.5 – Sports
- WKDF – 103.3 – Country
- WQQK – 92.1 – Urban adult contemporary
- WSM-FM – 95.5 – Country
- WWTN – 99.7 – News/talk

Tri-Cities

- WGOC – 1320 – Business
- WJCW – 910 – Talk
- WKOS – 104.9 – Country/Nash Icon
- WQUT – 101.5 – Classic rock
- WXSM – 640 – Sports

== Texas ==
Abilene

- KBCY — 99.7 – Country
- KCDD — 103.7 – Contemporary hit radio
- KHXS — 102.7 – Classic rock
- KTLT — 98.1 – Adult Contemporary

Amarillo

- KARX – 107.1 – Country/Nash Icon
- KPUR – 1440 – Silent
- KPUR-FM – 95.7 – Texas country
- KQIZ-FM – 93.1 – Rhythmic contemporary
- KZRK-FM – 107.9 – Active rock

Beaumont

- KAYD-FM – 101.7 – Country
- KQXY-FM – 94.1 – Contemporary hit radio
- KTCX – 102.5 – Urban contemporary

Dallas/Fort Worth

- KLIF – 570 – News/talk
- KPLX – 99.5 – Country
- KSCS – 96.3 – Country
- KTCK – 1310 – Sports talk
- KTCK-FM – 96.7 – Sports talk (simulcast of KTCK)
- WBAP – 820 – News/talk
- WBAP-FM – 93.3 – News/talk (simulcast of WBAP)

Houston

- KRBE – 104.1 – Contemporary hit radio

Wichita Falls

- KLUR – 99.9 – Country
- KOLI – 94.9 – Silent
- KQXC-FM – 103.9 – Rhythmic contemporary
- KYYI – 104.7 – Classic rock

== Utah ==
Salt Lake City

- KBEE — 98.7/92.3/95.3 — Adult contemporary
- KBER — 101.1 — Mainstream rock
- KENZ — 94.9 — Top 40/CHR
- KHTB — 101.9 — Top 40/CHR (simulcasts KENZ)
- KKAT — 860 — News/talk
- KUBL-FM — 93.3 — Country

== Wisconsin ==
Appleton

- WNAM — 1280 — Silent
- WOSH — 1490/93.9 — News/talk
- WPKR — 99.5 — Country
- WVBO — 103.9 — Classic hits
- WWWX — 96.9 — Alternative rock

Green Bay

- WDUZ — 1400/95.5 — Sports (simulcast of WDUZ-FM) University of Wisconsin Green Bay Men's and Women's Basketball.
- WDUZ-FM — 107.5 — Sports
- WOGB — 103.1 — Classic hits
- WKRU — 106.7 — Classic rock
- WQLH — 98.5 — Hot adult contemporary

== See also ==
- Nash FM — national country music branding used by many Cumulus stations since 2013
