= KNSH (AM) =

Radio station in Canyon, Texas (1962–2020)

Canyon, Texas; United States
- Broadcast area: Amarillo metropolitan area
- Frequency: 1550 kHz

Ownership
- Owner: Cumulus Media; (Cumulus Licensing LLC)
- Sister stations: KARX, KPUR, KPUR-FM, KQIZ, KZRK-FM

History
- First air date: May 8, 1962
- Last air date: February 27, 2020
- Former call signs: KVPH (1962–1963); KCAN (1963–1977); KHBJ (1977–1986); KAKS (1986–1995); KZRK (1995–2002); KAYD (2002); KZRK (2002–2013); KNSH (2013–2020); KLSZ (2020)

Technical information
- Facility ID: 39591
- Class: B
- Power: 1,000 watts (daytime); 219 watts (nighttime)
- Transmitter coordinates: 34°58′54″N 101°57′18″W

KNSH was the call sign assigned from 2013 to 2020, and the last call sign used on the air, for radio station KLSZ in the Amarillo, Texas, area. This station broadcast on AM frequency 1550 kHz and was under ownership of Cumulus Media. Its studios were located at the Amarillo Building downtown on Polk Street, and its transmitter tower was based in Canyon, where the station was licensed to serve.

== History ==
In January 2008, it began airing hot talk John Clay Wolfe and the daily nooner weekdays at 12 from ESPN Radio affiliate KSEY from Vernon, Texas.

KZRK was airing a news/talk format before the format change in 2007, then carried Spanish-language sports programming before going silent in September 2012. It came back on the air in October 2012 with a simulcast of sports-formatted KPUR (1440 AM).

On January 3, 2012, KZRK changed its format to talk, branded as "Talk 1550". On December 31, 2013, KZRK changed its call letters to KNSH.

The facility had experienced issues with its antenna tuning unit since 2018, resulting in prolonged periods of silence. On February 20, 2020, KNSH swapped callsigns with KLSZ-FM, a Nash FM country station in Fort Smith, Arkansas. Cumulus then surrendered the license for newly-recalled KLSZ to the FCC on February 25, and the FCC cancelled the license on February 27.
