= WSSO =

- Starkville, Mississippi; United States
- Broadcast area: West Point, Mississippi
- Frequency: 1230 kHz
- Branding: 1230 The Team

Programming
- Format: Sports
- Affiliations: Infinity Sports Network

Ownership
- Owner: Cumulus Media; (Cumulus Licensee LLC)
- Sister stations: WKOR-FM; WMXU; WNMQ; WSMS

History
- First air date: April 14, 1949 (first license granted)
- Last air date: March 7, 2025

Technical information
- Licensing authority: FCC
- Facility ID: 57709
- Class: C
- Power: 1,000 watts unlimited
- Transmitter coordinates: 33°27′9.4″N 88°49′15.2″W

Links
- Public license information: Public file; LMS

WSSO (1230 AM) was a radio station licensed to the city of Starkville, Mississippi. It was owned by Cumulus Media, through licensee Cumulus Licensing LLC. Until going silent in 2025, it broadcast a sports format known as "1230 The Team". The station carried programming from Infinity Sports Network.

AM 1230 is a local Class C frequency within the 48 states, and stations on this frequency are allowed to broadcast 24 hours per day.

WSSO used the same call letters since it began broadcasting.

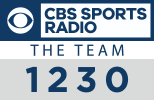
Logo under the previous CBS Sports Radio name

WSSO ceased operations March 7, 2025. It was one of six Cumulus stations to close the weekend of March 7, as part of a larger shutdown of underperforming Cumulus stations, and was one of four defunct Cumulus stations to surrender their licenses that September. The Federal Communications Commission cancelled the station's license on September 29, 2025.
