= WGOC =

Coordinates: 36°33′12″N 82°28′58″W

- Kingsport, Tennessee; United States
- Broadcast area: Tri-Cities, Tennessee
- Frequency: 1320 kHz
- Branding: WGOC AM 1320

Programming
- Format: Business radio
- Affiliations: BizTalkRadio

Ownership
- Owner: Cumulus Media; (Radio License Holding CBC, LLC)
- Sister stations: WJCW; WKOS; WQUT; WXSM

History
- First air date: 1951
- Last air date: July 2026
- Former call signs: WKIN (1951–2007)

Technical information
- Licensing authority: FCC
- Facility ID: 67671
- Class: B
- Power: 5,000 watts day; 500 watts night

Links
- Public license information: Public file; LMS

WGOC was an AM radio station licensed to Kingsport, Tennessee. Until going silent in 2026, the station had a business radio format. It had broadcast on AM frequency 1320 kHz and was under the ownership of Cumulus Media.

== History ==
The station signed on the air in 1951 under the call letters WKIN and was soon owned by Cy Bahakel. The station was originally daytime-only and, over the years, increased its power to 5,000 watts. In the 1960s and 1970s the station was a popular Top 40 outlet with a personality-DJ format.

Nighttime service was added in 1981 with a new four-tower directional array at the intersection of East Stone Drive and New Beason Well Road in Kingsport, and a nighttime power of 500 watts. The 5-kW daytime operation was consolidated to this site as well in about 1990.

In 1982 WKIN changed to a country format under the branding "A Great Brand Of Country". Variations of country and classic country would continue over the next couple of decades.

WGOC logo before transfer to AM 1320 frequency.

The WGOC call sign was on 640 AM from April 9, 1993, until February 26, 2007, when the callsign was moved to what had been WKIN, a news/talk and sports station.

Citadel Broadcasting, which had owned WJCW and WQUT since 1977, bought WGOC and WKIN in 2000. Prior to its business radio programming, WGOC was broadcasting a classic country, bluegrass, and gospel format. Citadel merged with Cumulus Media on September 16, 2011.

In July 2026, WGOC went silent because of financial reasons. The license was cancelled on September 23.
