= KPUR =

KPUR may refer to:

- KPUR (AM), a radio station (1440 AM) licensed to serve Amarillo, Texas, United States
- KPUR-FM, a radio station (95.7 FM) licensed to serve Claude, Texas
- KARX (FM), a radio station (107.1 FM) licensed to serve Canyon, Texas, which held the call sign KPUR-FM from 1989 to 2018
