= KKEG =

Radio station in Bentonville, Arkansas, United States

- Bentonville, Arkansas; United States
- Broadcast area: Northwest Arkansas
- Frequency: 98.3 MHz
- Branding: 98.3 KKEG

Programming
- Format: Classic hits

Ownership
- Owner: Cumulus Media; (Cumulus Licensing LLC)
- Sister stations: KAMO-FM; KFAY; KMCK-FM; KQSM-FM; KRMW-FM; KYNG

History
- First air date: November 7, 1983
- Former call signs: KBCV (1983–1995); KFAY-FM (1995–2004); KQSM-FM (2004–2009)
- Call sign meaning: "Keg"

Technical information
- Licensing authority: FCC
- Facility ID: 16571
- Class: C1
- ERP: 100,000 watts
- HAAT: 188 meters (617 ft)
- Transmitter coordinates: 36°7′38″N 93°59′23″W

Links
- Public license information: Public file; LMS
- Webcast: Listen Live
- Website: www.983kkeg.com

KKEG (98.3 FM, "98.3 KKEG") is a commercial radio station broadcasting a classic hits radio format. Licensed to Bentonville, it serves Northwest Arkansas and is owned by Cumulus Media. The studios and offices are on Frontage Road in Fayetteville.

KKEG has an effective radiated power (ERP) of 100,000 watts, the maximum for non-grandfathered FM stations. The transmitter is on Pug Gayer Road in Fayetteville. The signal is heard in parts of Arkansas, Missouri and Oklahoma.

== History ==
In 1969, the station signed on as Northwest Arkansas' only rock station, originally at 92.1 MHz in Fayetteville, Arkansas. The format was free form, allowing the disc jockeys to choose the music they wanted to play, with the freedom to discuss music, pop culture and other topics between songs.

In the late 1970s, the station moved to a more structured playlist. The station aired tracks from the most popular rock albums. In 1980, KKEG was the first Northwest Arkansas radio station to give away a new vehicle. In 1999, KKEG celebrated 30 years of broadcasting rock and roll to Northwest Arkansas listeners by giving away a home.

Logo as 98.3 The Keg

On June 11, 2009, the rock format on 92.1 FM Fayetteville was moved to 98.3 FM as "98.3 The Keg" along with the KKEG call sign. The KQSM-FM call sign was moved to 92.1 FM.

On April 17, 2025 at 10am, KKEG changed their format from active rock to classic hits.

Past DJs: Jack Daniels, Mojo, Droid, Laura K., Dave Fry, Joel Casey, JB, Sandy Scott, Jon Williams, Stash, Mareike, Miller.

In August 2026, Cumulus Media announced it will sell KKEG, along with WIXV, to Radio Training Network for $2,050,000.
