= KARX =

KARX may refer to:

- KARX (FM), a radio station (107.1 FM) licensed to serve Canyon, Texas, United States
- KPUR-FM, a radio station (95.7 FM) licensed to serve Claude, Texas, which held the call sign KARX from 1991 to 2018
