= Nash (brand) =

Media brand and network owned by Cumulus Media in the United States

Nash logo

Nash is a media brand owned by Cumulus Media. It covers country music-related properties owned by Cumulus, including radio stations, digital properties and publications (Nash Country Daily), Nash TV (a video on-demand service operated in partnership with Music Choice), concerts promoted by Nash FM stations (Nash Bash), and associated programming syndicated by Westwood One—including The Ty Bentli Show (formerly Ty, Kelly & Chuck and America's Morning Show), Nash Nights Live with Shawn Parr (heard evenings) and The Blair Garner Show (heard overnight). The Lia Show, which had been separately syndicated by Westwood One in the evening hours, replaced Garner in August 2020 until it was itself cancelled at the end of 2022. Its name comes from Nashville, Tennessee, the center of the commercial country music industry in the United States, which in turn was named for colonial-era politician and Continental Army General Francis Nash. The Nash FM branding is similar to the Hank FM branding in that these stations play over 1000 songs as opposed to other stations which play 300 to 600 songs.

The brand launched in 2013 with the launch of WNSH (now Classic Hip-Hop formatted WXBK) in New York City, and has since been adopted by other Cumulus-owned stations carrying country music (typically hot country formats with a focus on current hits and acoustic-leaning pop crossovers), although those with heritage brands have not always switched to the Nash FM branding (but may still carry programming associated with it).

A sub-brand, Nash Icon, covers radio stations and a record label oriented towards acts associated with the 1990s and early 2000s.

== List of Nash FM-branded stations ==
Callsign	MHz	City	Market	Start date	Former name	Notes
KHKI	97.3	Des Moines, Iowa	Des Moines, Iowa	May 24, 2013	"97.3 X Country"	
KBBM	100.1	Jefferson City, Missouri	Columbia, Missouri	October 7, 2013	"Sports Radio 100.1 The Fan"	Formerly sports talk
WKOR-FM	94.9	Columbus, Mississippi	Columbus, Mississippi	February 3, 2014	"K-94.9"	
KNSH	100.7	Fort Smith, Arkansas	Fort Smith, Arkansas	October 31, 2016	"100.7 Nash Icon"	

=== Former "Nash FM" stations ===
- WNSH — Newark, New Jersey — Original and flagship Nash FM station under Cumulus ownership. Operated by Entercom since March 1, 2019, then owned outright after May 13, 2019. Rebranded as "New York's Country 94-7" on March 25, 2019. Switched to classic hip-hop on October 22, 2021 and new calls WXBK; an automated country format under the same branding remains through the station's HD Radio subchannel.
- WJCL-FM - Savannah, Georgia - Station dropped the Nash FM branding and reverted to its previous "Kix 96" branding on December 4, 2015.
- KSJO - San Jose, California - Cumulus operated the station under a leasing agreement with Universal Media Access from May 25, 2014 to March 1, 2016, when Universal ended the arrangement, as it dropped the format for Bollywood music as "Bolly 92.3". The Nash FM format moved to KSAN's HD2 subchannel the same day as the flip.
- KAMO-FM - Rogers, Arkansas - Dropped Nash FM and switched over to Nash Icon on July 3, 2016.
- KRMD-FM - Oil City, Louisiana - Dropped Nash FM branding and reverted to its previous KRMD branding on July 5, 2016.
- KQFC - Boise, Idaho - Dropped Nash FM branding and switched to classic country on April 3, 2017. KQFC flipped to Soft AC in October 2019 and adopted the moniker Magic 97.9.
- WHLZ - Marion, South Carolina - Dropped Nash FM branding to Hot AC as Q100.5 and changed call letters to WQPD on April 17, 2017.
- KBUL-FM - Reno, Nevada - Dropped Nash FM branding and returned as K-Bull 98.1 FM.
- WRKN - New Orleans, Louisiana - Moved over to 106.1 FM on June 19, 2017.
- WZCY-FM - Hershey, Pennsylvania - Swapped call signs, frequencies, and formats with WWKL on March 15, 2018
- KSAN (FM) - San Francisco, California - Flipped from Nash FM to a simulcast of KNBR on 107.7 HD2 in June 2018.
- WRKN-FM - Picayune, Mississippi - Flipped from Nash FM branding to Nash Icon on November 8, 2018.
- WIWF - Charleston, South Carolina - Dropped Nash FM branding and reverted to its previous Wolf branding on November 19, 2018.
- WTNR - Holland, Michigan - Dropped Nash FM branding and reverted as Thunder Country on January 4, 2019.
- WPSK-FM - Pulaski, Virginia - Dropped Nash FM and reverted to its original branding, "107.1 PSK" during early 2019.
- KRST - Albuquerque, New Mexico - Launched Nash FM on May 30, 2014. It was later dropped and reverted to its original branding, "92.3 KRST" in June 2019.
- WNNF - Cincinnati, Ohio - Dropped Nash FM and rebranded as "Cat Country 94.1" on October 1, 2019.
- WPCK - Denmark, Wisconsin - On November 1, 2019, Nash FM was dropped and flipped to Christmas music ahead of sale to EMF. Eventually, it has flipped to KLove on January 8, 2020.
- WFYR - Peoria, Illinois - Dropped Nash FM and reverted to its previous "River Country" branding on February 3, 2020.
- WDRQ - Detroit, Michigan - Launched Nash FM on December 13, 2013. It was dropped and relaunched as New Country 93.1 on February 18, 2020. As of August 2, 2023, it switched to Family Life Radio after being sold to Family Life Broadcasting.
- WXBM-FM - Pensacola, Florida - Launched Nash FM on February 3, 2014 but was dropped and reverted as 102.7 WXBM on March 9, 2020.
- KAYD-FM - Silsbee, Texas - Launched Nash FM on July 3, 2013 Dropped Nash FM and reverted as KAYD 101.7 on April 1, 2020.
- KATC-FM - Colorado Springs, Colorado - Launched Nash FM on October 31, 2014. It was later dropped and reverted as "Cat Country 95.1" on April 8, 2020.
- WKDF - Nashville, Tennessee - Launched Nash FM on February 3, 2014 but was dropped and rebranded as "103.3 Country" on May 14, 2020.
- WVLK-FM - Lexington, Kentucky - Launched Nash FM on May 24, 2013 but was dropped and rebranded as "K 92.9" on September 4, 2020.
- KXKC - New Iberia, Louisiana - Launched Nash FM on September 6, 2013 but was rebranded back to "99.1 KXKC" on September 4, 2020.
- WHKR - Rockledge, Florida - Launched Nash FM on July 3, 2013 but was rebranded back as "102.7 The Hitkicker" on October 5, 2020.
- WKAK - Albany, Georgia - Launched Nash FM on July 3, 2013 but was rebranded as "FM 104.5" shortly after the sale to First Media Services closed on December 18, 2020. It was later changed to Georgia 104.5 on April 7, 2021.
- WFBE - Flint, Michigan - Launched Nash FM on February 3, 2014 but was rebranded back to "B95" after 7 years on April 1, 2021.
- WPKR - Omro, Wisconsin - Launched Nash FM on May 24, 2013 but was rebranded as "99.5 PKR" on April 5, 2021.
- WZCY-FM - Mechanicsburg, Pennsylvania - Launched Nash FM on March 15, 2018 but it was dropped for classic rock as "93.5 WTPA" on December 20, 2021.
- WYZB - Mary Esther, Florida - Launched Nash FM on February 3, 2014 but was rebranded as "Y105.5" on March 30, 2023.
- WLFF - Georgetown, South Carolina - Launched Nash FM September 6, 2013 but switched to the Nash Icon brand on February 26, 2024
- WXTA - Edinboro, Pennsylvania - Launched Nash FM on February 3, 2014 but rebranded as "Erie Country 97.9" on March 28, 2024
- WSJR - Dallas, Pennsylvania - Launched Nash FM on July 3, 2013 but rebranded as "Cat Country 93.7 & 95.7" on March 10, 2025
- WMDH-FM - New Castle, Indiana - Launched Nash FM on September 6, 2013 but rebranded back to "102.5 WMDH" on July 9, 2026

== Nash Icon ==
In May 2014, Westwood One announced a spin-off of the Nash brand known as Nash Icon (previously announced as Nash Icons). The Nash Icon brand encompasses radio stations, content, and events oriented towards the "biggest country artists of the last two decades, who are still recording and touring but not getting enough exposure today"; Westwood One CEO Lew Dickey felt that there was not yet a "middle ground" between modern and classic country similarly to that of the Adult contemporary format (which lies between Contemporary hit radio and classic hits). The first Nash Icon stations were launched at 12:00 p.m. ET on August 15, 2014, with the flips of W255CJ in Atlanta and WZAT in Savannah, Georgia, followed by a number of other Westwood One stations throughout the day. In January 2015, Westwood One began to syndicate Nash Icon to non-Westwood One stations.

The Nash Icon brand also includes a vanity label for veteran country artists operated in partnership with Big Machine Records. On October 21, 2014, it was announced that Reba McEntire would be the first artist to be part of the label. Shortly after McEntire's announcement, Ronnie Dunn began to tease that he would be the next artist to sign. Dunn officially confirmed on December 1, 2014, that he was indeed the second artist to sign with the label. Martina McBride announced that she had signed with the label on December 29, 2014. On April 29, 2015, Hank Williams Jr. announced that he had signed with the label.

The airstaff of Nashville's WSM-FM serves as the network's 24/7 airstaff, although individual stations reserve the right to use local personalities. Some Nash Icon stations also carry Westwood One's Ty, Kelly, and Chuck morning show, which primarily serves Nash FM stations.

=== List of Cumulus-owned Nash Icon stations ===
Callsign	MHz	City	Market	Start date	Former name	Notes
KQLK	97.9	De Ridder, Louisiana	Lake Charles, Louisiana	August 15, 2014	“Hot 97.9”	Was Top 40 (CHR)
WMIM	98.3	Luna Pier, Michigan	Monroe, Michigan-Toledo, Ohio	October 3, 2014	"My 98.3 WMIM"	Was Adult Contemporary
WORC-FM	98.9	Webster, Massachusetts	Worcester, Massachusetts	October 31, 2014	"98.9 ORC-FM"	Was Classic Hits
WKOS	104.9	Kingsport, Tennessee	Tri-Cities, Tennessee / Virginia	April 24, 2015	104.9 Nash FM	Flipped from Nash FM to the Nash Icon format. The station also maintained a country music format known as "Great Country 104.9" before that.
KAMO-FM	94.3	Rogers, Arkansas	Fayetteville, Arkansas	July 3, 2016	"94.3 Nash FM"	Flipped from Nash FM to Nash Icon
KARX	107.1	Canyon, Texas	Amarillo, Texas	January 15, 2018	"95.7 Nash Icon"	Switched frequencies with 95.7 as 107.1 Nash Icon
WLFF	106.5	Georgetown, South Carolina	Myrtle Beach, South Carolina	February 26, 2024	"106.5 Nash FM"	Dropped Nash FM branding to Nash Icon.
KRBE-HD2	104.1	Houston, Texas	Houston, Texas	April 20, 2025	"Good Time Oldies"	After the demise of Westwood One’s “Good Time Oldies” 24/7 syndicated format, KRBE fliped the HD2 Subchannel to the Classic Country “Nash Icon” Format.

=== List of non-Cumulus-owned Nash Icon stations ===
Callsign	MHz	City	Market	Start date	Former name	Notes
WYRY	104.9	Hinsdale, New Hampshire	Hinsdale, New Hampshire	August 3, 2015	"Hot Country 104.9"	
WXKU-FM	92.7	Austin, Indiana	Austin, Indiana	September 15, 2015	"Kix 92.7"	
WWKY-FM	104.9	Providence, Kentucky	Providence, Kentucky	April 2, 2017	"104.9 The Wave"	
WILE	1270	Cambridge, Ohio	Cambridge, Ohio	April 13, 2018	"107.9 Nash Icon"	
WABH	1380	Bath, New York	Elmira-Corning/Hornell	unknown	"1380/100.3 WABH"	

=== Former "Nash Icon" stations ===
- K273BZ/KCMO-HD2-Kansas City, Missouri. Joined the network on its August 15, 2014 debut. Flipped to alternative rock on November 2, 2015.
- W255CJ/WWWQ-HD2-Atlanta, Georgia. Joined the network on its August 15, 2014 debut as the first station to join. Flipped to Christmas music on November 23, 2015. The station then changed to a mainstream adult contemporary format on December 26, 2015, then flipped back to an alternative rock format on January 1, 2016.
- WRYD-Snow Hill, Maryland/Delmarva Peninsula. Became the first non-Cumulus owned station when it became syndicated by Westwood One. Flipped to a current-based country format a few months later, then gospel music on October 5, 2015.
- WZRR-Birmingham, Alabama. Joined the network on its August 15, 2014 debut. Flipped to Southern Rock/Country on May 20, 2016, then flipped to News/Talk on May 24, 2016.
- KRRF-Ventura, California. Joined the network on its August 15, 2014 debut. Flipped to classic hip hop on May 27, 2016.
- WOMG-Columbia, South Carolina. Flipped to classic hits on July 1, 2016.
- KRMW-Fayetteville, Arkansas. Joined the network on its August 15, 2014 debut. Flipped to Adult Alternative on July 15, 2016. Nash Icon was moved to sister station KAMO.
- KLSZ-FM-Fort Smith, Arkansas. Joined the network on its August 15, 2014 debut. Flipped to Nash FM brand on October 31, 2016.
- WELJ-New London, Connecticut. Bought by Bold Broadcasting and flipped to Christmas music on November 1, 2016.
- WUVA-Charlottesville, Virginia. Joined the network on September 18, 2015. Rebranded as C-Ville Country 92.7 on March 1, 2017 after WUVA is currently being sold to Saga Communications on Jan 2017.
- WZAT-Savannah, Georgia. Joined the network on its August 15, 2014 debut. Flipped to Hot AC on March 24, 2017.
- WCKR-Hornell, New York. Flipped to Hot AC on May 1, 2017 as "Fun 92.1."
- W237DE-Harrisburg, Pennsylvania. Flipped back to sports as "CBS Sports Harrisburg" during Spring 2017.
- KARX-Claude, Texas. Joined on February 9, 2016. Flipped to Texas Red Dirt Country as "Texas Country 95.7, The Armadillo" on January 15, 2018.
- WVLK-FM-Lexington, Kentucky]. Flipped to Adult Hits as 101.5 Jack FM on February 20, 2018.
- WKCM-Hawesville, Kentucky. Dropped the National Nash Icon Format and switched to localized music on August 1, 2018.
- KJJY-Des Moines, Iowa. Joined the network on its August 15, 2014 debut. Quietly flipped back to its former branding "92.5 KJJY" on May 28, 2019.
- WNUQ-Albany, Georgia. Joined the network on its August 15, 2014 debut. Dropped Nash Icon on November 27, 2019 due to the sale closing to Pretoria Fields Collective Media from The Mainstay Station Trust. The station was rebranded as "Q102, The Queen Bee" and a new format was launched on January 27, 2020. The call letters were also changed to WPFQ.
- KBZU-Albuquerque, New Mexico. Joined the network on its August 15, 2014 debut. Flipped to a simulcast to sister station KKOB (AM) on January 6, 2020.
- WLAW-Newaygo, Michigan. Switched frequencies with sister WWSN to 92.5 as "Sunny 92.5" on April 1, 2019.
- KGIL-Ridgecrest, California. Became the first non-Cumulus owned Nash Icon station as it launched on October 25, 2015. Dropped Nash Icon and rebranded as "Superstar Country 98.5" on February 7, 2020.
- WHHT-Cave City, Kentucky. Became the first non-Cumulus owned Nash Icon station as it launched on February 5, 2015. Dropped Nash Icon and rebranded as "Nash 103.7" on August 6, 2020. It then simply rebranded as "103.7 WHHT" on April 18, 2024.
- WOGT-Chattanooga, Tennessee. Dropped Nash Icon for Christmas music on November 5, 2020. Shortly after stunting Christmas, the station rebranded as "New Country 107.9" on December 28, 2020.
- KORL-FM-Honolulu, Hawaii. K298BA (KORL-HD3) flipped Nash Icon to Smooth Jazz as "Jazzy 107.5" on March 12, 2021.
- WHLL-Springfield, Massachusetts. Launched as Nash Icon in December 2018 before swapping to Entercom in February 2019. On March 22, 2021, WHLL rebranded as "Hall Of Fame Country 98.1"
- KTOP-FM-Topeka, Kansas. Dropped Nash Icon after 6 years and rebranded as "102.9 Cat Country" on September 13, 2021.
- WKMO-Lebanon Junction, Kentucky
- WDRQ-HD2-Detroit, Michigan Joined the network on its August 15, 2014 debut but was quietly dropped as of 2023.
- WRKN-New Orleans, Louisiana Launched on November 8, 2018 but flipped back to sports on March 1, 2024.
- WLAW-FM-Whitehall, Michigan. On March 14, 2025, the station was turned off and is silent as part of the company's 11 under-performing stations being shut down during the weekend of March 14.
- WJBC-FM-Pontiac, Illinois. Joined the network on its August 15, 2014 debut but was shut down on March 17, 2025 as part of the company's 11 under-performing stations being shut down during the weekend of March 14.
- WSM-FM-Nashville, Tennessee. Joined the network on its August 15, 2014 debut and Served as the nominal flagship station, although its programming was locally focused and was slightly different from all other Nash Icon stations, However on June 4th, 2025, It reverted back to being known simply as 95.5 WSM-FM, and also dropped the Nash Icon Format, and is refocusing on Most Recent Country Music.
- WWFF-FM-Huntsville, Alabama. Joined the network on November 14, 2014 but was shut down in September 2026 after it was sold to Radio Training Network.

== Critical reception ==
While there has been some good feedback on the launching of the Nash FM brand, it was a different story involving the Nash Icons' launching. In a commentary from Radio Insight, Lance Venta notes that Nash Icon's soft launch did not generate the attention that Nash FM got, adding that the stations that flipped to the format are in markets with more than 2 Country outlets (or in the case of Kansas City, 3 and Toledo, Ohio, 4) that have better ratings and more established, while others (like KQLK at Lake Charles, Louisiana) flipped from a format that had good ratings in order to cut into the ratings of a competitor (KNGT) and to protect a sister Country station (KYKZ). Venta later stated "Does this mean Nash Icon is destined for failure? Not at all. Cumulus is putting resources behind the Nash and Nash Icon brands that puts other formats to shame. This launch though has felt disjointed, rushed, and not what Cumulus and Big Machine first hyped it to be. Once the brand is fleshed out and additional features/shows are added, there could easily be additional demand for a brand to acts as the Adult Contemporary equivalent for Country listeners in a world where many of the format's stations are evolving towards a CHR styling."
