= KZRK =

KZRK may refer to:

- KZRK-FM, a radio station (107.9 FM) licensed to Canyon, Texas, United States
- KNSH, a radio station (1550 AM) licensed to Canyon, Texas, which held the call sign KZRK from 2002 to 2013
