= KFAY =

Coordinates: 36°06′34.3″N 94°11′1.7″W

- Farmington, Arkansas; United States
- Broadcast area: Fayetteville-Springdale-Rogers Metropolitan Area
- Frequency: 1030 kHz
- Branding: NewsTalk 1030

Programming
- Format: Talk radio
- Affiliations: ABC News Radio; Westwood One

Ownership
- Owner: Cumulus Media; (Cumulus Licensing LLC)
- Sister stations: KAMO-FM, KKEG, KMCK-FM, KQSM-FM, KRMW, KYNG

History
- First air date: January 28, 1947
- Former call signs: KGRH (1947–1958); KHOG (1958–1986)
- Former frequencies: 1450 kHz (1947–1961); 1440 kHz (1961–1984)
- Call sign meaning: Fayetteville

Technical information
- Licensing authority: FCC
- Facility ID: 16573
- Class: B
- Power: 6,000 watts (day); 1,000 watts (night)

Links
- Public license information: Public file; LMS
- Webcast: Listen live
- Website: newstalk1030.com

KFAY (1030 AM, "NewsTalk 1030") is a radio station serving the Fayetteville, Arkansas, area with a talk format. It is under ownership of Cumulus Media.

KFAY originally signed on as KGRH 1450 kHz, licensed to Fayetteville. It later changed callsign to KHOG and moved to 1440 kHz. KHOG programmed a top-40 format in the 1970s. KHOG moved from 1440 kHz to 1030 kHz frequency in the mid-1980s under the ownership of Broadcast Associates. KHOG, however, was only on the more powerful 1030 signal for less than three years. Broadcast Associates was late to get FM signals for its stations and ultimately decided to exit the Fayetteville market. Demaree Media, which owned crosstown KFAY 1250 and KKEG 92.1, arranged a deal to acquire 1030, sending KFAY there. KHOG went to 1250 and was sent to a religious broadcaster who took over the station and rechristened it KOFC.
