= KMCK-FM =

Contemporary hit radio station in Prairie Grove, Arkansas

- Prairie Grove, Arkansas; United States
- Broadcast area: Northwest Arkansas
- Frequency: 105.7 MHz
- Branding: Power 105.7

Programming
- Language: English
- Format: Top 40 (CHR)
- Affiliations: United Stations Radio Networks

Ownership
- Owner: Cumulus Media; (Cumulus Licensing LLC)
- Sister stations: KAMO-FM; KFAY; KKEG; KQSM-FM; KRMW; KYNG

History
- First air date: 1947

Technical information
- Licensing authority: FCC
- Facility ID: 64630
- Class: C1
- ERP: 100,000 watts
- HAAT: 145 meters (476 ft)
- Transmitter coordinates: 36°11′7″N 94°17′49″W

Links
- Public license information: Public file; LMS
- Webcast: Listen live; Listen live (via Audacy); Listen live (via iHeartRadio)
- Website: www.power1057.com

KMCK-FM (105.7 MHz) is a commercial radio station broadcasting a contemporary hit radio format. The station is licensed to Prairie Grove, Arkansas, and serves Northwest Arkansas. It is known as "Power 105.7" and is owned by Cumulus Media.

KMCK has an effective radiated power (ERP) of 100,000 watts, the maximum for non-grandfathered FM stations. The transmitter is off Liberty Avenue in Tontitown, Arkansas. Its signal reaches parts of Arkansas, Oklahoma and Missouri.

== History ==
It signed on the air in 1947, as KUOA-FM, owned by John Brown University in Siloam Springs, Arkansas. It was originally powered at 2,600 watts, a fraction of its current output.

The station was previously known as "Night Flight 106" and later "K106", running a Top 40 format. In the mid-1980s, the station’s format was downgraded towards hot adult contemporary. The station returned back to its Top 40 format on July 30, 1989, and changed its branding to "Power 105.7" (originally named "The Power Station"). The station originally competed against its Top 40 rival KCIZ-FM (KC105), but KMCK became the only CHR station in the Fayetteville market after KCIZ dropped its format in April 1991.
