= KQSM-FM =

Radio station in Fayetteville, Arkansas, United States

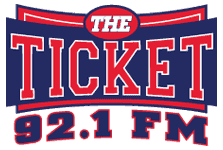
- Fayetteville, Arkansas; United States
- Broadcast area: Northwest Arkansas
- Frequency: 92.1 MHz
- Branding: 92.1 The Ticket

Programming
- Format: Sports
- Affiliations: Infinity Sports Network; NFL on Westwood One; Arkansas Razorbacks Network

Ownership
- Owner: Cumulus Media; (Cumulus Licensing LLC)
- Sister stations: KAMO-FM, KFAY, KKEG, KMCK-FM, KRMW, KYNG

History
- First air date: October 16, 1964
- Former call signs: KFAY-FM (1964–1970); KKEG (1970–2009)
- Call sign meaning: "Sam" (former branding on 98.3)

Technical information
- Licensing authority: FCC
- Facility ID: 16569
- Class: C3
- ERP: 7,600 watts
- HAAT: 162 meters (531 ft)
- Transmitter coordinates: 36°7′38″N 93°59′23″W

Links
- Public license information: Public file; LMS
- Webcast: Listen live Listen Live via iHeart
- Website: 921theticket.com

KQSM-FM (92.1 FM) is a commercial radio station licensed to Fayetteville, Arkansas, United States. Owned by Cumulus Media, it features a sports format known as "92.1 The Ticket". It has been the #1 rated sports radio station in Northwest Arkansas in every ratings book (Arbitron and Nielsen) in total listeners and average share since its inception in June 2009.

Its transmitter is off Pug Gayer Road in Fayetteville. The studios and offices are on Frontage Road, off North College Road (U.S. Route 71 Business) in Fayetteville.

== History ==
On October 16, 1954, the station first signed on the air. It was originally KFAY-FM, the sister station of KFAY 1250 AM. The two stations mostly simulcast a country music format and were owned by H. Weldon Stamps. KFAY-FM ran 3,000 watts, less than half of its current output. It later switched to an easy listening format, separate from the AM station.

In 1970, it switched to Album Oriented Rock as "92.1 The Keg" with the call sign KKEG. Ten years later in 1980, the station dropped AOR and flipped to a Top 40 format for only seven years. During its seven years as a Top 40 station, KKEG downgraded its Top 40 formula from mainstream to rock-leaned in late 1986 shortly after former adult contemporary station KCIZ-FM flipped to mainstream Top 40/CHR that same year. The following year in 1987, KKEG dropped its rock-leaned Top 40 format and returned back to its former AOR format. KKEG was acquired by Cumulus Media in 1999.

On June 11, 2009, the KKEG call sign and rock music format were moved to 98.3 FM in Bentonville, Arkansas. The KQSM-FM call sign that had previously been on 98.3 FM was then transferred to 92.1 FM and branded as "Sports Radio 92.1 The Ticket.” In June 2011, PD Josh Bertaccini was hired and “The Red Zone with JB” debuted that summer. In January 2013, parent company Cumulus Media entered into a partnership with the new CBS Sports Radio Network. Over 150 Cumulus sports stations around the U.S., including KQSM-FM, switched their network affiliation to CBS Sports Radio.

== Programming ==
Program Director Josh Bertaccini hosts "The Red Zone with JB" on weekday mornings. He also hosts "Razorback Recap" after Arkansas Razorbacks football games and “Double OT” after Arkansas Razorback basketball games. The Paul Finebaum Show, focusing on Southeastern Conference (SEC) college sports, is heard weekday afternoons. Nights and weekends, KQSM-FM carries Westwood One Sports.

KQSM-FM broadcasts all University of Arkansas Razorbacks football, basketball and baseball games. In addition, The Ticket carried Northwest Arkansas Naturals minor league baseball broadcasts for 10 years. The Naturals are the Double A affiliate of the Kansas City Royals. 92.1 The Ticket is also the exclusive radio home for NFL on Westwood One broadcasts in Northwest Arkansas.
