= KAMO-FM =

Radio station in Rogers, Arkansas, United States

- Rogers, Arkansas; United States
- Broadcast area: Fayetteville, Arkansas
- Frequency: 94.3 MHz
- Branding: 94.3 Nash Icon

Programming
- Format: Country

Ownership
- Owner: Cumulus Media; (Cumulus Licensing LLC)
- Sister stations: KFAY, KKEG, KMCK-FM, KQSM-FM, KRMW, KYNG

History
- First air date: 1971
- Call sign meaning: Arkansas Missouri Oklahoma

Technical information
- Licensing authority: FCC
- Facility ID: 31881
- Class: C2
- ERP: 25,000 watts
- HAAT: 211 meters (692 ft)
- Transmitter coordinates: 36°26′30″N 93°58′26″W

Links
- Public license information: Public file; LMS
- Webcast: Listen live Listen live (via iHeartRadio)
- Website: nashfm943.com

KAMO-FM (94.3 MHz) is a radio station broadcasting a country music format. Licensed to Rogers, Arkansas, United States, it serves the Fayetteville (North West Arkansas) area. The station is owned by Cumulus Media. KAMO was once owned by Leon McAuliff who played steel guitar for Bob Wills, leader of the Texas Playboys.
