= Country Weekly =

American music magazine

- The June 15, 2015 issue, the first after the rename to Nash Country Weekly, featuring Sam Hunt on the cover.
- Editor-in-Chief: Lisa Konicki
- Categories: Music magazine
- Frequency: Weekly
- Publisher: Cumulus Media
- Total circulation: 63,924 (December 2011)
- First issue: April 12, 1994
- Final issue: May 2, 2016
- Country: USA
- Based in: Nashville, Tennessee
- Language: English
- ISSN: 1074-3235

Country Weekly (known as Nash Country Weekly from 2015–16) was an American magazine about country music. It was in circulation between April 1994 and May 2016. The publisher, Cumulus Media, now maintains the site Nash Country Daily.

== Overview ==
The magazine was established in 1994 by American Media, Inc. It focused on country music stars and events, and regularly featured exclusive interviews with recording artists and country music news. Country Weekly also cosponsored the CMT/TNN Country Weekly Music Awards, at the time the only nationally televised country music awards show that allowed fans to vote for the winners.

In February 2009, Country Weekly reverted to a weekly magazine, after having been issued fortnightly since 1999. The magazine also dropped subscriptions at that point (which it later reinstated), and changed its logo. Cumulus Media acquired Country Weekly in 2014. The magazine was renamed Nash Country Weekly in June 2015, as a means of co-branding with Nash FM. Nash Country Weekly closed its print publication in April 2016.

On May 6, 2016, Cumulus launched Nash Country Daily as an online media site.
