= WMBC =

WMBC may refer to:

== Broadcast call signs ==
- WMBC-TV, a television station (channel 18, virtual 63) licensed to Newton, New Jersey, United States
- WMBC-LP, a defunct low-power radio station (100.9 FM) formerly licensed to Norton Shores, Michigan, United States
- WNMQ, a radio station (103.1 FM) licensed to Columbus, Mississippi, United States, which held the call sign WMBC from December 1984 to October 2008
- WMBC (college radio), the internet radio station (formerly AM) at University of Maryland, Baltimore County, formerly known as WUMD (college radio)

== Other uses ==
- Wigan Metropolitan Borough Council
- Windsor Memorial Baptist Church
- Wholesale Broadband Managed Connect, a BT Wholesale product
- Wolverhampton Metropolitan Borough Council, former name of City of Wolverhampton Council, England
