= WNCV =

- Shalimar, Florida; United States
- Broadcast area: Fort Walton Beach, Florida
- Frequency: 93.3 MHz
- Branding: Coast 93.3

Programming
- Format: Adult contemporary
- Affiliations: Compass Media Networks; Westwood One

Ownership
- Owner: Cumulus Media; (Cumulus Licensing LLC)
- Sister stations: WFTW, WKSM, WYZB, WZNS

History
- First air date: 1983 (as WEGN-FM at 93.5)
- Former call signs: WEGN-FM (1983–1988); WIJK-FM (1988–1992); WPGG (1992–2006); WRKN (7/06–8/06)
- Former frequencies: 93.5 MHz (1983–1993)

Technical information
- Licensing authority: FCC
- Facility ID: 73395
- Class: C2
- ERP: 50,000 watts
- HAAT: 143 meters (469 ft)
- Transmitter coordinates: 30°24′38.7″N 86°37′21.8″W

Links
- Public license information: Public file; LMS
- Webcast: Listen Live
- Website: wncv.com

WNCV (93.3 FM, "Coast 93.3") is a radio station licensed to serve Shalimar, Florida, United States. The station is owned by Cumulus Media and the license is held by Cumulus Licensing LLC.

== Programming ==
WNCV broadcasts an adult contemporary music format to the greater Fort Walton Beach, Florida, area. Notable syndicated programming on WNCV includes the John Tesh Radio Show hosted by John Tesh.

== History ==
=== Beginning ===
The station received its original construction permit from the Federal Communications Commission on November 23, 1981, for a new FM station in Evergreen, Alabama, broadcasting with 3,000 watts of effective radiated power at 93.5 MHz. The new station was assigned the call letters WEGN-FM by the FCC on January 31, 1983.

In March 1982, Vogel Moody Corp. contracted to sell the permit for this still-under construction station to Stafford Broadcasting, Inc. The deal was approved by the FCC on May 6, 1982. WEGN-FM received its license to cover from the FCC on December 20, 1983.

In December 1983, less than a week before the station received its broadcast license, Stafford Broadcasting, Inc., made a deal to sell WEGN-FM to Davis Broadcasting, Inc. The deal was approved by the FCC on February 14, 1984, and the transaction was consummated on February 29, 1984.

In October 1986, Davis Broadcasting encountered financial difficulties and the station's broadcast license was involuntarily transferred to Wayne Stafford acting as receiver. Within two weeks, Stafford arranged to sell the station to Wolff Broadcasting Corp. The deal was approved by the FCC on December 10, 1986, and the transaction was consummated on December 31, 1986. The new owners had the station's callsign changed to WIJK-FM on May 10, 1988.

=== Move to 93.3 ===
In May 1989, WIJK-FM received a construction permit authorizing the station to change to the current 93.3 MHz frequency, upgrade to class C2, and increase effective radiated power to 50,000 watts. On October 26, 1992, the station had its call letters changed to WPGG. The station received its license to cover for these changes on February 8, 1993.

In January 1995, WPGG received another construction permit, this time authorizing a move to class C1 and an increase in effective radiated power to 100,000 watts. The station was given its license to cover at this power on June 14, 1996.

In February 1999, Wolff Broadcasting Corp. agreed to sell this station and AM sister station WIJK to Gulf Coast Broadcasting Company, Inc. (R. Lee Hagan, president) for a reported combined sale price of $1.5 million. The deal was approved by the FCC on April 13, 1999, and the transaction was consummated on May 10, 1999.

In November 2003, Gulf Coast Broadcasting Company, Inc. (R. Lee Hagan, president) made a deal to sell this station and AM sister station WIJK to Star Broadcasting, Inc. (Ronald E. Hale, Jr., president) for a reported combined sale price of $2.75 million. The deal was approved by the FCC on April 13, 2004, and the transaction was consummated on April 18, 2005. This would prove short-lived as less than a month later, in May 2005, Star Broadcasting, Inc., applied to trade this station to Cumulus Media holding company Cumulus Licensing LLC in exchange for WNCV (100.3 FM, now WTKE-FM) in Niceville, Florida. The deal was approved by the FCC on March 23, 2006, and the transaction was consummated on August 2, 2006.

=== Move to Florida ===
Logo under former slogan

In June 2005, the station applied for a construction permit to change its community of license to Shalimar, Florida, just over 80 miles south-southeast of Evergreen, Alabama. The permit, which would also see the station downgraded to class C2 and an effective radiated power of just 50,000 watts, was granted on June 20, 2006. The station applied for and received new call letters WRKN on July 18, 2006, then less than two week later applied for and received the current WNCV call letters on August 1, 2006. The FCC accepted the station's filing for a license to cover for this new location and power on August 3, 2006, and the station has been operating from Shalimar under the construction permit since this date.

== Controversy ==
The station made national headlines in November 1992 when the Supreme Court of Alabama ruled in Howard v. Wolff Broadcasting Corp. that Alabama state law permits employers to fire people solely because of their gender. Patricia Williams Howard sued after she was fired from her job as disc jockey and advertising salesperson at WEGN-FM, then owned by Wolff Broadcasting Corp., on January 26, 1988. The station manager told Howard she was being let go at the insistence of the station owner's wife, Karen Wolff, as she "did not want any females on the air". The unanimous ruling stated that only the Alabama Legislature could pass a law prohibiting such firings, in light of Alabama's at-will employment laws.
