= KQXC-FM =

- Wichita Falls, Texas; United States
- Broadcast area: Wichita Falls metropolitan area
- Frequency: 103.9 MHz
- Branding: Hot 103.9

Programming
- Format: Rhythmic top 40
- Affiliations: Compass Media Networks

Ownership
- Owner: Cumulus Media; (Cumulus Licensing LLC)
- Sister stations: KLUR, KOLI, KYYI

History
- First air date: January 7, 1994
- Former call signs: KQXC (1991-2001); KKTT (2001-2002)

Technical information
- Licensing authority: FCC
- Facility ID: 55380
- Class: C2
- ERP: 19,000 watts
- HAAT: 246 meters (807 ft)

Links
- Public license information: Public file; LMS
- Webcast: Listen live
- Website: thehot1039.com

KQXC-FM (103.9 MHz), branded as Hot 103.9, is a radio station serving Wichita Falls, Texas, and vicinity with a rhythmic top 40 format. It is under ownership of Cumulus Media.
