= WZNS =

Contemporary hit radio station in Fort Walton Beach, Florida

- Fort Walton Beach, Florida; United States
- Broadcast area: Crestview–Fort Walton Beach–Destin metropolitan area
- Frequency: 96.5 MHz (HD Radio)
- Branding: Z96

Programming
- Language: English
- Format: Contemporary hit radio
- Subchannels: HD2: WFTW simulcast
- Affiliations: Westwood One

Ownership
- Owner: Cumulus Media; (Cumulus Licensing LLC)
- Sister stations: WFTW; WKSM; WNCV; WYZB

History
- First air date: July 21, 1997
- Former call signs: WJUS (1997)
- Call sign meaning: We're Zee Ninety-Six

Technical information
- Licensing authority: FCC
- Facility ID: 32834
- Class: C1
- ERP: 100,000 watts
- HAAT: 133.5 meters (438.0 ft)
- Transmitter coordinates: 30.414083°N 86.627722°W

Links
- Public license information: Public file; LMS
- Webcast: Listen live; Listen live (via Audacy); Listen live (via iHeartRadio)
- Website: www.z96.com

WZNS (96.5 FM, branded as Z96) is a radio station serving the Fort Walton Beach, Florida area with a contemporary hit radio format. This station is under ownership of Cumulus Media.
