= WKSM =

Coordinates: 30.414083°N 86.627722°W

- Fort Walton Beach, Florida; United States
- Broadcast area: Emerald Coast
- Frequency: 99.5 MHz
- Branding: 99 Rock

Programming
- Format: Mainstream rock

Ownership
- Owner: Cumulus Media; (Cumulus Licensing LLC)
- Sister stations: WFTW, WNCV, WYZB, WZNS

History
- First air date: May 28, 1965
- Former call signs: WFTW-FM (1965–1978, 1979–1988); WFTW (1978–1979)
- Former frequencies: 99.3 MHz (1965–1994)
- Call sign meaning: Former "Kiss FM" branding

Technical information
- Licensing authority: FCC
- Facility ID: 27467
- Class: C2
- ERP: 50,000 watts
- HAAT: 133.5 meters (438 ft)

Links
- Public license information: Public file; LMS
- Webcast: Listen live
- Website: wksm.com

WKSM (99.5 FM) is a commercial radio station licensed to Fort Walton Beach, Florida, United States, and serving the Emerald Coast. Owned by Cumulus Media, it features a mainstream rock format, branded "99 Rock". The studios and transmitter are co-located on Hollywood Boulevard NW in Fort Walton Beach.

== History ==
The station signed on the air on May 28, 1965, as the FM simulcast of WFTW (1260 AM). WFTW-FM was originally on 99.3 MHz, broadcasting at 3,000 watts, a fraction of its current output. Both stations were owned by Vacationland Broadcasting. Because WFTW 1260 was a daytimer, WFTW-FM continued the AM station's programming after sunset.

FM 99.3 was a Class A frequency, limited at the time to only local coverage. So management decided to move WFTW-FM's dial position. The Federal Communications Commission (FCC) permitted it to move slightly up the dial to 99.5 MHz and get a boost in power. The signal now covers a significant part of the larger and more lucrative Pensacola radio market.

In the late 1960s, WFTW-FM stopped simulcasting 1260 WFTW. It began broadcasting a beautiful music format. The station featured quarter-hour sweeps of mostly instrumental cover versions of popular songs, as well as Broadway and Hollywood show tunes. The station would later flip to an adult contemporary format, and then later Top 40/CHR in May 1985. It was one out of two CHR stations in the Fort Walton Beach and Destin areas, with the other being WNUE. The station's call letters were changed to WKSM in April 1988, retaining its CHR format under the branding "99 KISS-FM". The format lasted until mid-November 1991, and the station switched to its current album rock format. This left WNUE the only Top-40 station in Fort Walton Beach until it became a sports radio format in 1992.

In 1993, WKSM and WFTW were sold for $1 million to Holiday Broadcasting. In 2003, Cumulus Media acquired the two stations.
