= KYYI =

FM radio station in Texas

Coordinates: 34.093°N 98.879°W

- Burkburnett, Texas; United States
- Broadcast area: Wichita Falls metropolitan area
- Frequency: 104.7 MHz
- Branding: 104.7 The Bear

Programming
- Format: Classic rock
- Affiliations: Dallas Cowboys

Ownership
- Owner: Cumulus Media; (Cumulus Licensing LLC)
- Sister stations: KLUR, KOLI, KQXC

History
- First air date: 1989
- Former call signs: KXWT (1985–1989)

Technical information
- Licensing authority: FCC
- Facility ID: 58740
- Class: C1
- ERP: 92,000 watts
- HAAT: 310 meters (1,020 ft)

Links
- Public license information: Public file; LMS
- Webcast: Listen live Listen Live via iHeart
- Website: bear104.com

KYYI (104.7 FM), branded as "104.7 The Bear", is a radio station serving Wichita Falls, Texas, and vicinity with a classic rock format. It operates on FM frequency 104.7 MHz and is under ownership of Cumulus Media. KYYI's transmitter is located northeast of Electra in northwestern Wichita County.

The station is an affiliate of the Dallas Cowboys radio network.

== History ==
In 1989, KYYI came on the air with a modern country format and was branded "Hot Country Y104" competing with 99.9 KLUR, the market's long time heritage country station. In 1993, Sam Beard, owner of KLUR secured a lease management agreement for KYYI and took over control of KYYI sales and programming and eventually would purchase KYYI and maintain ownership until selling to Cumulus in 1997.

A format change to classic rock was implemented by Cumulus in December 1997 and the station was rebranded as "104 The Bear". In 2008, the station's branding was refined to "The Bear 104.7".

Current on air line up

John Boy & Billy 6am-10am (syndicated from WRFX) Keith Vaughn 2p-7pm Bob Ray weekends

Past BEAR air staff

Joe "Mad" Martin (1997-98 mornings, 2005-2007 mid days) Bobby Brown "The Bobbo Show" (afternoons 1997-98, mornings 1998-1999) Kerri TeeGarden (97-2000 afternoons) Doc Randle (97-2002 nights) Keith Vaughn & Tim McMillin "Vaughn & The Mac" (2000-2003 mornings) Keith Vaughn (1999- mornings, mid days, afternoons) Bob Ray (2005- weekends) Pam Kelly (2004-2007 nights) Dave Wylder (2002-2003 nights) Brent Warner (2000-2006 afternoons) Vicki Vox (2007- nights)
