= KOLI =

Currently silent
- Electra, Texas; United States
- Broadcast area: Wichita Falls metropolitan area
- Frequency: 94.9 MHz
- Branding: 94.9 The Outlaw

Programming
- Format: Modern country

Ownership
- Owner: Cumulus Media; (Cumulus Licensing LLC)
- Sister stations: KLUR; KQXC-FM; KYYI

History
- First air date: January 30, 1998

Technical information
- Licensing authority: FCC
- Facility ID: 78344
- Class: C2
- ERP: 50,000 watts
- HAAT: 150 meters (490 ft)
- Transmitter coordinates: 34.084°N 98.992°W

Links
- Public license information: Public file; LMS

KOLI is a radio station in Electra, Texas, serving Wichita Falls and vicinity. Until going silent in March 2025, it programmed a country music format, based in Texas country to distinguish it from sister KLUR which plays mainstream country. It operates on FM frequency 94.9 MHz and is under ownership of Cumulus Media. It was the radio flagship station for the Wichita Falls Wildcats hockey team.

Originally proposed in 1995 as a non-commercial educational station, KOLI went on the air in 1998 as a commercial oldies station programmed by, and subsequently sold to, Cumulus Media. It switched to classic country in 2001, and Texas and red dirt country in 2006. Cumulus took the station off the air in 2025.

== History ==
Larry D. Hickerson's High I-Q Radio Inc., applied for a construction permit for a non-commercial educational station on 94.9 MHz in Electra on November 8, 1995. The new station was assigned the call sign KOLI on January 9, 1998, and went on the air January 30; on February 4, despite the non-commercial educational permit, it began operating as a commercial station, a decision that High I-Q attributed to "a change in circumstances" in its license application. A few months after putting it on the air, High I-Q filed to sell the station to Cumulus Broadcasting for $238,400, a deal completed on August 10, 1999. KOLI joined a Cumulus cluster in Wichita Falls that already included KLUR, KQXC, and KYYI; the company had already been programming the station under a time brokerage agreement. In its early years, KOLI was an oldies station; it switched to classic country in 2001.

The launch of KOLI and its sale to Cumulus were opposed by Apex Broadcasting, owner of a competing cluster of Wichita Falls radio stations, as High I-Q Radio had turned over managerial and financial control of the station to Cumulus as early as 1997, and did not properly obtain authorization to convert its non-commercial educational permit to commercial status. In 2004, the Federal Communications Commission (FCC) admonished High I-Q and Cumulus.

In 2006, KOLI began programming Texas and red dirt country as "94.9 The Outlaw". On February 24, 2025, program director and morning host James Cook announced that Cumulus would close KOLI on February 28; he would remain with the company to host an "Outlaw"-branded Saturday night red dirt country program on KLUR. Cook subsequently announced that KOLI's closure had been postponed, with only his morning show ending on February 28; industry trade website RadioInsight subsequently reported that the station would remain on the air until mid-March. KOLI would be one of 11 Cumulus stations to close the weekend of March 14, as part of a larger shutdown of underperforming Cumulus stations.
