= WGLF =

Coordinates: 30.451°N 84.012°W

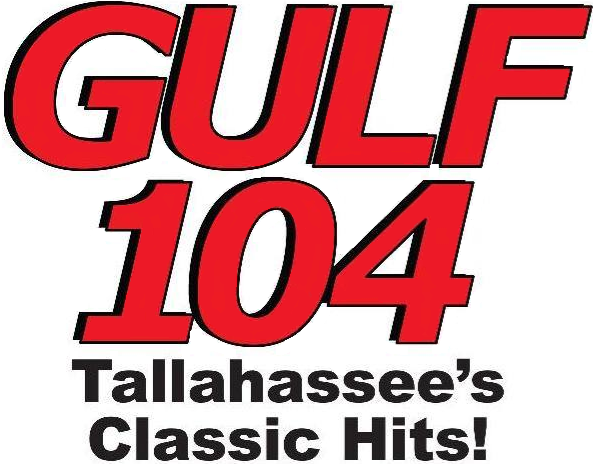

Tallahassee, Florida; United States
- Broadcast area: Alabama, Florida, Georgia Tri-State Area
- Frequency: 104.1 MHz
- Branding: Gulf 104

Programming
- Format: Classic hits

Ownership
- Owner: Cumulus Media; (Cumulus Licensing LLC)
- Sister stations: WBZE, WHBX, WWLD

History
- First air date: December 1967 (as WANM)
- Former call signs: WANM (1967–1970)
- Call sign meaning: a reference to the Gulf of Mexico

Technical information
- Licensing authority: FCC
- Facility ID: 64559
- Class: C0
- ERP: 100,000 watts
- HAAT: 430.2 meters

Links
- Public license information: Public file; LMS
- Webcast: Listen live Listen Live via iHeart
- Website: gulf104.com

WGLF (104.1 FM) is a classic hits radio station in the Tallahassee, Florida, market owned by Cumulus Media. Its studios are located in the westside of Tallahassee and its transmitter is based east of the city near Lloyd, Florida.

== History ==
WGLF has been broadcasting since the spring of 1970 and was the longest-running FM rock radio station in the state of Florida from late 1988 until a shift to classic hits in the late 2010s.

Prior, it was one out of the 2 dominant Top 40/CHR stations for the Tallahassee market. After becoming an AOR format in late 1988, WFHT (now WWOF, known as Z103) became the main dominant Top 40 station for the Tallahassee market until 1995. WGLF was one of the first four FM stations in the Tallahassee market along with WOMA, WBGM, and WOWD.

Although based in Tallahassee, WGLF can be heard all the way into the Tifton, Georgia, and Lake City, Florida markets.
