= KQIZ-FM =

Radio station in Amarillo, Texas

Coordinates: 35.293°N 101.847°W

Amarillo, Texas; United States
- Broadcast area: Amarillo, Texas
- Frequency: 93.1 MHz
- Branding: 93.1 the Beat

Programming
- Format: Rhythmic top 40
- Affiliations: Compass Media Networks

Ownership
- Owner: Cumulus Media; (Cumulus Licensing LLC)
- Sister stations: KARX, KNSH, KPUR-FM/AM, KZRK-FM

History
- First air date: 1977

Technical information
- Licensing authority: FCC
- Facility ID: 41567
- Class: C1
- ERP: 100,000 watts
- HAAT: 213 meters (699 ft)

Links
- Public license information: Public file; LMS
- Webcast: Listen Live
- Website: 931thebeat.com

KQIZ-FM (93.1 MHz) is a rhythmic top 40 music formatted radio station in Amarillo, Texas, United States. KQIZ is owned by the media company, Cumulus Media. Its studios are located at the Amarillo Building downtown on Polk Street, and its transmitter tower is based north of the city on the property of television station KFDA-TV in unincorporated Potter County.

It was originally a Top 40 CHR radio station called Z-93. In September 2000, it altered its format from the pop/CHR-styled Top 40 format to a rhythmic/CHR focusing less on rock and more on hip hop, R&B and some dance music and changed its name to 93.1 The Beat. The first song under their new format was "Party Up" by rapper DMX. Almost all the Z-93 on-air staff was let go prior to the format change

KQIZ was owned by Wiskes Abaris Communications until they were acquired by Cumulus Media in 1998.

== Personalities ==
As of February 1, the full-time personalities were:

- The Kidd Kraddick Morning Show Move to KMXJ KMXJ-FM
- Deana E! McGuire
- Supreme

The station is also an affiliate of the syndicated Baka Boyz, Clinton Sparks Smash Time Radio, MTV TRL Hip Hop Countdown, Sunday Nite Slow Jams with R-Dub, and Live in the Den with Big Tigger.
