= WWLD =

Coordinates: 30.492°N 84.284°W

- Cairo, Georgia; United States
- Broadcast area: Tallahassee, Florida
- Frequency: 102.3 MHz (HD Radio)
- Branding: Blazin' 102.3

Programming
- Format: Urban contemporary
- Subchannels: HD2: Gospel music "Heaven 98.3"; HD3: Christian adult contemporary "K-Love"
- Affiliations: Premiere Networks

Ownership
- Owner: Cumulus Media; (Cumulus Licensing LLC)
- Sister stations: WBZE, WGLF, WHBX

Technical information
- Licensing authority: FCC
- Facility ID: 38640
- Class: C2
- ERP: 27,000 watts
- HAAT: 184 meters (604 ft)
- Translators: HD2: 98.3 W252BN (Tallahassee, Florida); HD3: 103.7 W279CU (Tallahassee, Florida)

Links
- Public license information: Public file; LMS
- Webcast: Listen live HD2: Listen live
- Website: blazin1023.com HD2: heaven983.com

WWLD (102.3 FM) is an urban contemporary formatted radio station licensed to Cairo, Georgia, and serving the Tallahassee, Florida, market and surrounding areas. The station is owned by Cumulus Media. According to Radio and Records, WWLD is now the highest-rated radio station in the Tallahassee market. Its studios are located in the westside of Tallahassee and its transmitter is based due north of downtown along I-10.

Logo under previous slogan
