= WXSM =

Coordinates: 36°31′19″N 82°25′25″W

- Blountville, Tennessee; United States
- Broadcast area: Tri-Cities, Tennessee
- Frequency: 640 kHz

Programming
- Format: Sports
- Affiliations: Infinity Sports Network, Tennessee Titans, East Tennessee State Buccaneers

Ownership
- Owner: Cumulus Media; (Radio License Holding CBC, LLC)
- Sister stations: WGOC, WJCW, WKOS-FM, WQUT

History
- First air date: 1967
- Former call signs: WCQR (1986–1987); WJTZ (1987–1993); WGOC (1993–2007)
- Call sign meaning: W Xtreme Sports Monster

Technical information
- Licensing authority: FCC
- Facility ID: 29513
- Class: B
- Power: 10,000 watts day 810 watts night
- Repeater: 101.5 WQUT-HD2 (Johnson City)

Links
- Public license information: Public file; LMS
- Webcast: Listen Live
- Website: 640wxsm.com

WXSM (640 AM) is a radio station serving the Tri-Cities, Tennessee vicinity with a sports format as a Infinity Sports Network affiliate. It is under ownership of Cumulus Media. WXSM also broadcasts Tennessee Titans NFL games, plus ETSU Buccaneer and Dobyns-Bennett High School games.

== History ==
This station had the callsign WCQR on June 16, 1986, then changing to WJTZ on November 2, 1987. From April 9, 1993 until February 26, 2007, the 640 frequency was home to classic country WGOC.

Logo under previous slogan
