= KPBI (AM) =

- Fayetteville, Arkansas; United States
- Broadcast area: Northwest Arkansas
- Frequency: 1250 kHz
- Branding: La Poderosa 106.1 y 1250

Programming
- Format: Regional Mexican

Ownership
- Owner: Larry Morton; (KTV Media, LLC)

History
- First air date: June 30, 1957
- Former call signs: KFAY (1957–1986); KHOG (1986–1987); KOFC (1987–2017); KRRD (2017–2021)

Technical information
- Licensing authority: FCC
- Facility ID: 72491
- Class: D
- Power: 920 watts day 45 watts night
- Transmitter coordinates: 36°2′26″N 94°16′32″W
- Translator: 106.1 K291CK (Fayetteville)

Links
- Public license information: Public file; LMS
- Website: lapoderosaar.com

KPBI (1250 kHz) is an AM radio station licensed to Fayetteville, Arkansas, United States, serving northwest Arkansas. The station is currently owned by Larry Morton, through licensee KTV Media, LLC.

== History ==
On February 20, 1957, the Stamps Radio Broadcasting Company, owned by H. Weldon and Clifford L. Stamps, obtained a construction permit from the Federal Communications Commission to start a new 500-watt, daytime-only radio station in Fayetteville. Broadcasting from KFAY, the city's second outlet, began on June 30, 1957, with programming from the Mutual Broadcasting System and St. Louis Cardinals baseball. Weldon became the sole owner in 1959 and increased power to 1,000 watts during the day in 1961.

After building KFAY-FM 92.1 in 1965, Stamps sold the stations in 1966 to the Big Chief Broadcasting Company of Fayetteville.

In 1986, KFAY 1250 orchestrated a swap with KHOG 1030, which had a more powerful 24 hour signal. KFAY moved to 1030 while KHOG went to 1250, which was then sent to a local Baptist minister who took the station religious as KOFC.

The station (then known as KOFC) and its translator K277AZ were acquired by Media One Group from Bott Radio Network on October 2, 2017, at a purchase price of $125,000. The station changed its call sign to KRRD that same day.

The previous Red Dirt country format began to air on the higher-power KXRD on March 15, 2021, as Rox Radio Group sold KRRD and its translator to KTV Media, LLC for $300,000. The sale was consummated on May 14, 2021, with the call sign changing to KPBI the same day. It also assumed a Regional Mexican format on May 15, 2021 as "La Poderosa 106.1 y 1250".
