= WHBX =

Coordinates: 30.269°N 84.275°W

- Tallahassee, Florida; United States
- Broadcast area: Tallahassee, Florida
- Frequency: 96.1 MHz
- Branding: 96.1 Jamz

Programming
- Format: Urban adult contemporary
- Affiliations: Premiere Networks

Ownership
- Owner: Cumulus Media; (Cumulus Licensing LLC)
- Sister stations: WBZE, WGLF, WWLD

History
- Former call signs: WMNX (1981-88); WTMG (1988-91)
- Former frequencies: 95.9 MHz (1981-91)

Technical information
- Licensing authority: FCC
- Facility ID: 28168
- Class: C2
- ERP: 37,000 watts
- HAAT: 143.3 meters (470 ft)

Links
- Public license information: Public file; LMS
- Webcast: Listen Live
- Website: 961jamz.com

WHBX (96.1 FM), or 96.1 Jamz, is an urban adult contemporary radio station in the Tallahassee, Florida market owned by Cumulus Licensing, LLC. According to AllAccess.com, WHBX is the highest rated station in the Tallahassee, FL market, joining sister stations Blazin 102.3 and Star 98 as the market's highest rated stations. Its studios are located in the westside of Tallahassee and its transmitter is based near Wakulla State Forest, south of the city.

== History ==
WMNX signed on in 1981 on 95.9 MHz. By 1982, it was carrying an automated country format. In 1988, the callsign changed to WTMG.

In 1991, WTMG moved up 200 kHz to 96.1, which afforded it a class change from A to C2 and a much stronger signal. The callsign was changed to WHBX to accompany the new facility. Cumulus acquired WBZE and WHBX in 1997 for $15.4 million.
