= KLUR =

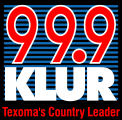
- Wichita Falls, Texas; United States
- Broadcast area: Wichita Falls metropolitan area
- Frequency: 99.9 MHz
- Branding: 99.9 KLUR

Programming
- Format: Modern country
- Affiliations: Westwood One

Ownership
- Owner: Cumulus Media; (Cumulus Licensing LLC)
- Sister stations: KOLI, KQXC, KYYI

History
- First air date: April 14, 1963

Technical information
- Licensing authority: FCC
- Facility ID: 58741
- Class: C1
- ERP: 100,000 watts
- HAAT: 246.3 meters (808 ft)
- Transmitter coordinates: 33.901°N 98.540°W

Links
- Public license information: Public file; LMS
- Webcast: Listen live
- Website: klur.com

KLUR (99.9 FM) is a radio station serving Wichita Falls, Texas, and vicinity with a country music format. It is under ownership of Cumulus Media.

== History ==
Construction of KLUR, named KFMC for its first few months of existence, began in November 1962, and the station signed on shortly after on April 14, 1963. The station was built and originally owned by Fred Marks, CEO of Nortex Broadcasting Company. KLUR Broadcasting Company bought the station in 1970 and upgraded it from 20,000 watts ERP to 100,000 three years later; Cumulus bought the station from the Beard family in 1997.

The station has had many nicknames including "King of the Country". Former on-air talent includes Bob St. Clair (Will Hutson), Dan Baker, Jim Russell, and Gary Walker.
