= WBZE =

Coordinates: 30.492°N 84.284°W

Tallahassee, Florida; United States
- Broadcast area: Tallahassee, Florida
- Frequency: 98.9 MHz
- Branding: Star 98.9

Programming
- Format: Adult contemporary
- Affiliations: Premiere Networks; United Stations Radio Networks; Westwood One

Ownership
- Owner: Cumulus Media; (Cumulus Licensing LLC)
- Sister stations: WGLF, WHBX, WWLD

History
- First air date: July 15, 1962 (63 years ago)
- Former call signs: WBGM (1962–1986); WBGM-FM (1986–1994)
- Call sign meaning: W BreeZE

Technical information
- Licensing authority: FCC
- Facility ID: 28164
- Class: C1
- ERP: 100,000 watts
- HAAT: 184 meters (604 ft)

Links
- Public license information: Public file; LMS
- Webcast: Listen live
- Website: mystar98.com

WBZE (98.9 FM, "Star 98.9") is an adult contemporary radio station in the Tallahassee, Florida, market owned by Cumulus Licensing, LLC. Its studios are located on the west side of Tallahassee and its transmitter is based due north of downtown along I-10. According to AllAccess.com, WBZE is the third-highest-rated station in the market, following only sister stations WHBX and WWLD.

== History ==
The station signed on the air on July 15, 1962, as the first FM station in Tallahassee. The station has been an adult contemporary formatted station since 1983. Prior to its adult contemporary launch in 1983, the station previously had a Top 40 format.

In 2020, the station added Delilah to its weekly lineup.
