= WFTW =

Coordinates: 30°24′49″N 86°37′40″W

Currently silent
- Fort Walton Beach, Florida; United States
- Broadcast area: Emerald Coast
- Frequency: 1260 kHz

Ownership
- Owner: Cumulus Media; (Cumulus Licensing LLC)
- Sister stations: WKSM, WNCV, WYZB, WZNS

History
- First air date: November 20, 1953
- Former call signs: WFTW (1953–1979); WDIS (1979–1981)
- Call sign meaning: Fort Walton Beach

Technical information
- Licensing authority: FCC
- Facility ID: 27466
- Class: D
- Power: 2,500 watts (day); 131 watts (night)
- Translator: 107.5 W298CV (Fort Walton Beach)
- Repeater: 96.5 WZNS-HD2 (Fort Walton Beach)

Links
- Public license information: Public file; LMS

WFTW (1260 AM) is a silent commercial radio station licensed to Fort Walton Beach, Florida, United States, serving the Emerald Coast. It is owned by Cumulus Media. The radio studios and transmitter are on Hollywood Boulevard NW in Fort Walton Beach.

On March 28, 2025 at noon, WFTW went silent.

Logo before 107.5 sign on.

== History ==
WFTW first signed on the air on November 20, 1953 It was owned by Vacationland Broadcasting of Fort Walton Beach. The station was originally a daytimer, required to go off the air at night. It later got permission to operate at night at reduced power. WFTW originally had a middle of the road format of popular music, news and sports. It added an FM station in 1965, WFTW-FM, which today is WKSM.

On February 28, 1979, WFTW's call letters were changed to WDIS, but they were changed back to WFTW on the first day of 1981. The call letters WFTW earlier were assigned to a station in Fort Wayne, Indiana, that began broadcasting August 10, 1947.
