= KZRK-FM =

Coordinates: 35.227°N 102.007°W

- Canyon, Texas; United States
- Broadcast area: Amarillo metropolitan area
- Frequency: 107.9 MHz
- Branding: Rock 108

Programming
- Format: Active rock
- Affiliations: United Stations Radio Networks

Ownership
- Owner: Cumulus Media; (Cumulus Licensing LLC)
- Sister stations: KARX, KNSH, KPUR-FM/AM, KQIZ

History
- First air date: 1985 (as KHBQ)
- Former call signs: KHBQ (1985–1986); KAKS-FM (1986–1995)
- Call sign meaning: K Z RocK

Technical information
- Licensing authority: FCC
- Facility ID: 27009
- Class: C1
- ERP: 100,000 watts
- HAAT: 145 meters

Links
- Public license information: Public file; LMS
- Webcast: Listen Live
- Website: amarillosrockstation.com

KZRK-FM (107.9 MHz, "Rock 108") is a radio station serving the Amarillo, Texas area with an active rock format. This station is under the ownership of Cumulus Media. Its studios are located at the Amarillo Building downtown on Polk Street, and its transmitter tower is based west of Amarillo in unincorporated Potter County.
