= WMXU =

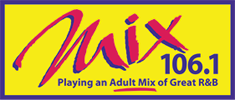
- Starkville, Mississippi; United States
- Broadcast area: Columbus, Mississippi
- Frequency: 106.1 MHz
- Branding: Mix 106.1

Programming
- Format: Urban adult contemporary

Ownership
- Owner: Cumulus Media; (Cumulus Licensing LLC)
- Sister stations: WKOR-FM; WNMQ; WSMS

History
- First air date: July 15, 1968 (as WSMU-FM at 106.3)
- Former call signs: WSMU-FM (1968–1988); WKYJ (1988–1991)
- Former frequencies: 106.3 MHz (1968–1992)

Technical information
- Licensing authority: FCC
- Facility ID: 57710
- Class: C2
- ERP: 40,000 watts
- HAAT: 153 meters (502 ft)
- Transmitter coordinates: 33.294°N 88.658°W

Links
- Public license information: Public file; LMS
- Webcast: Listen live
- Website: www.mymix1061.com

WMXU (106.1 FM, "Mix 106.1") is a radio station licensed to serve the community of Starkville, Mississippi, and serving the Columbus, Mississippi area. The station airs an urban AC format.
