= WQUT =

Coordinates: 36.269°N 82.339°W

- Johnson City, Tennessee; United States
- Broadcast area: Tri-Cities, Tennessee; Western North Carolina
- Frequency: 101.5 MHz (HD Radio)
- Branding: Tri-Cities Classic Rock

Programming
- Format: Classic rock
- Subchannels: HD2: WXSM simulcast; HD3: WJCW simulcast
- Affiliations: Premiere Networks; United Stations Radio Networks; Westwood One

Ownership
- Owner: Cumulus Media; (Radio License Holding CBC, LLC)
- Sister stations: WJCW; WKOS; WXSM

History
- First air date: March 1, 1948 (as WJHL-FM)
- Former call signs: WJHL-FM (1948–1960); WJCW-FM (1960–1972)

Technical information
- Licensing authority: FCC
- Facility ID: 67673
- Class: C
- ERP: 99,000 watts
- HAAT: 457 meters (1,499 ft)
- Translator: 104.9 W285DG (Boone, North Carolina)

Links
- Public license information: Public file; LMS
- Webcast: Listen live; Listen live (via iHeartRadio)
- Website: www.wqut.com

WQUT (101.5 FM) is a radio station in Tri-Cities, Tennessee. The station format is classic rock and is branded as "Tri-Cities Classic Rock 101.5 WQUT". As of the Fall 2008 Arbitron ratings book, WQUT is the third highest rated station in the Tri-Cities market (adults 12+) behind country music station WXBQ-FM and adult contemporary WTFM. Since the early 1990s, WQUT and WTFM have fought for the number-two spot in the market, with WXBQ rated the overall number-one station since 1993.

WQUT is the flagship station of Cumulus Media Tri-Cities and began broadcasting in 1948 as WJHL-FM on 101.5 Megahertz. In 1960, the callsign changed to WJCW-FM. In 1973, its effective radiated power was increased to 100,000 watts from its antenna on Buffalo Mountain in Johnson City, Tennessee.

== Programming ==
WQUT carries the "John Boy and Billy Big Show" (a syndicated show carried on many southeastern U.S. stations). Specialty shows include the Tennessee Midnight Rambler Show (approx. 1976 - 1982), Flashback with Bill St. James and House of Hair with Dee Snider. Its sister stations are WKOS, WJCW (which signed on in 1938), and WXSM.

WQUT is involved in community activities throughout the Tri-Cities market.

== Translator coverage ==
WQUT owns a translator in Boone, North Carolina, W285DG on 104.9 FM; it is located at the Fire Tower where Boone's communication towers are located. Previously, WQUT licensed translators in Lenoir, North Carolina, W232AV on 94.3 FM; and in Hazard, Kentucky, W244BW on 96.7 FM. The Lenoir translator switched to simulcasting WCQR-FM from Kingsport in the early-2000s, and the Hazard translator switched to simulcasting WZLK from Virgie, Kentucky, in the late-2000s.
