= WJCW =

Coordinates: 36°24′37″N 82°27′13″W

- Johnson City, Tennessee; United States
- Broadcast area: Tri-Cites–Bristol–Kingsport
- Frequency: 910 kHz
- Branding: WJCW AM 910

Programming
- Format: Talk radio
- Affiliations: ABC News Radio; Compass Media Networks; Radio America; Westwood One

Ownership
- Owner: Cumulus Media; (Radio License Holding CBC, LLC)
- Sister stations: WKOS; WQUT; WXSM

History
- First air date: December 13, 1938
- Former call signs: WJHL (1938–1960)
- Call sign meaning: James C. Wilson, former owner

Technical information
- Licensing authority: FCC
- Facility ID: 67672
- Class: B
- Power: 5,000 watts (day); 1,000 watts (night)
- Repeater: 101.5 WQUT-HD3 (Johnson City)

Links
- Public license information: Public file; LMS
- Webcast: Listen live
- Website: www.wjcw.com

WJCW (910 AM) is a commercial radio station licensed to Johnson City, Tennessee, and serving the Tri-Cities radio market (Johnson City-Bristol-Kingsport). It is owned by Cumulus Media and airs a talk format with national commentators.

WJCW's transmitter, offices and studios are on Free Hill Road in Gray, Tennessee. The complex also houses the studios for Cumulus' other Tri-Cities radio stations. WJCW broadcasts with a 5,000-watt non-directional signal in the daytime. At night, to protect other stations on AM 910, the station reduces power to 1,000 watts and uses a directional antenna. The station is East Tennessee's AM primary entry point station for the Emergency Alert System, with WJXB-FM in Knoxville performing the PEP function on FM in east Tennessee.

== History ==
The station first signed on the air on December 13, 1938. The original call sign was WJHL, jointly owned by Hanes Lancaster, Sr. and J. W. Birdwell, both from Chattanooga. It was the second radio station in the Tri-Cities and the first in Johnson City, Tennessee. It began broadcasting at 250 watts. During 1940, Birdwell was no longer a partner in the new station.

The station's original frequency was 1200 kHz. In December 1940, WJHL moved to 880 kHz with 1,000 watts, utilizing a directional three-tower pattern at night. With the North American Regional Broadcasting Agreement coming into force on March 29, 1941, the station was required to move to 910 kHz due to the adoption of the new international radio treaty.

In 1942, WJHL got a power boost to 5,000 watts by day and 1,000 watts at night. It became an affiliate of the NBC Blue Network, later ABC. By 1956, WJHL joined the CBS Radio Network, an affiliation that lasted five decades. Under Hanes Lancaster, Sr and son Hanes Jr., WJHL added WJHL-FM 100.7 in 1948 (now 101.5 WQUT) and in 1953 added WJHL-TV (channel 11). Because the AM station carried CBS Radio programming, WJHL-TV became a CBS-TV affiliate.

In 1960, the radio stations were sold to Tri-Cities Broadcasting, owned by James C. Wilson (son of the founder of the area's first radio station, WOPI in Bristol) Channel 11 kept the WJHL-TV call sign, while AM 910 was renamed WJCW after Wilson's initials and continued to program an middle of the road, full service format. In the early 1970s, the station switched to a country music format.

Notable announcers included:

- Eddie Cowell
- Dr. Herb Howard: Announcer, who went on to be Dean/Professor at the University of Tennessee College of Communication & Information after a stint as staff announcer at WJHL-TV.
- Professor Kingfish (Bill Marrs) and Little Richard (Dick Ellis), weekdays 6:30-7AM. During the 60s and 70s the show had a large listenership due to the light-hearted banter between the two. Due to health challenges, Bill Marrs would do the show from home, while Dick Ellis was at the studios.
- Dick Ellis (Little Richard): Morning Drive, News Director, Sports Director, and sports play-by-play. Dick originally served as news and sports anchor for both WJHL radio and television. In 1960 when the station was purchased and changed to WJCW, he chose to stay with radio. In 1973, Dick (Richard F. Ellis) became the General Manager of WETS-FM, the public/NPR station owned by East Tennessee State University. Dick retired from WETS in 1991. In 1993, a few weeks before his death, the new WETS studios were dedicated in his honor.
- Charlie B (Philip Beale): Program Director, Middays, and Afternoon Drive
- Bill Cramer: Nighttime announcer. In the 60s and 70s, WJCW's music would shift from MOR to Rock at 7PM. After WJCW changed to a country format, Cramer was also a well-known talent on sister-station WQUT
- Larry Hinkle
- Dave Hogan: Morning Drive
- Bill Williams
- Yankee Dave: Middays
- Tom Phillips: Afternoon Drive
- Art Countiss: News Director
- Red Pitcher: News/Sports Director

Jim Wilson/Tri-Cities Broadcasting sold WJCW and WQUT to Bloomington Broadcasting in 1981.

The original studios were located in downtown Johnson City. The transmitter site was on Princeton Road in North Johnson City. In 1977, new studios and transmitter site were built in Gray, Tennessee. The new location allowed the station's signal to cover a larger area, especially north of Johnson City, plus delivering a better signal to Kingsport.

In the 1980s, listeners began shifting to FM radio for music, so in 1990, WJCW became the Tri-Cities' first news/talk station.

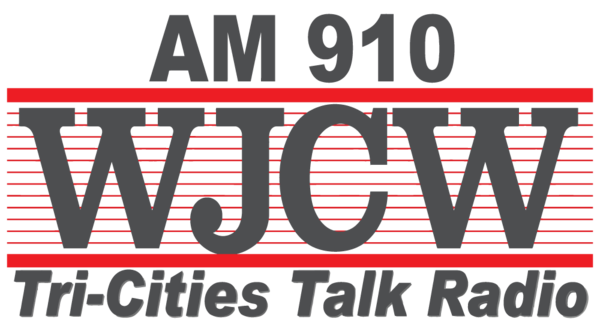
Previous logo

In 2000, the station was sold to Citadel Broadcasting, a forerunner of Cumulus Media.

== Programming ==
Most of WJCW's weekday schedule is made up of nationally syndicated talk shows. At dawn, America in the Morning is heard, followed by This Morning, America's First News with Gordon Deal, The Chris Plante Show, The Vince Show with Vince Coglianese, The Charlie Kirk Show, The Mark Levin Show, The Chad Benson Show, America at Night with Rick Valdes and Red Eye Radio. One hour of local talk is heard each morning at 8, In Touch with Don Helman.

Weekend programming includes shows on money, health, cars and other topics, some of which are paid brokered programming. NASCAR races are also broadcast. Most hours begin with world and national news from ABC News Radio.
