= WSMS =

- Artesia, Mississippi; United States
- Broadcast area: Columbus-Starkville-West Point
- Frequency: 99.9 MHz
- Branding: 99.9 The Fox

Programming
- Format: Album-oriented rock
- Affiliations: Westwood One

Ownership
- Owner: Cumulus Media; (Cumulus Licensing LLC)
- Sister stations: WKOR-FM; WMXU; WNMQ

History
- First air date: 1987
- Former call signs: WZIX (1984–1991); WJWF-FM (1991–1993); WQNN (1993–1996)

Technical information
- Licensing authority: FCC
- Facility ID: 6664
- Class: C2
- ERP: 47,000 watts
- HAAT: 154 meters (505 ft)
- Transmitter coordinates: 33°39′14.4″N 88°37′15.2″W

Links
- Public license information: Public file; LMS
- Webcast: Listen live; Listen live (via iHeartRadio)
- Website: 999thefoxrocks.com

WSMS (99.9 FM, "The Fox") is a radio station licensed to Artesia, Mississippi, United States, broadcasting an album-oriented rock format. Owned by Cumulus Media, the station serves the Columbus-Starkville-West Point area.

== History ==
The Federal Communications Commission issued a construction permit for the station to Bravo Communications, Inc. on May 10, 1984. The station was assigned the call sign WZIX on July 3, 1984, and received its license to cover on July 15, 1987. On June 1, 1991, the station changed its call sign to WJWF-FM. Bravo Communications assigned the station's license to the current owner, Cumulus Media, on February 14, 2002. On April 1, 1993, the station changed its call sign again to WQNN, and on March 1, 1996, to the current WSMS.
