= KPUR (AM) =

- Amarillo, Texas; United States
- Broadcast area: Amarillo metropolitan area
- Frequency: 1440 kHz

Programming
- Format: Country
- Affiliations: Dallas Cowboys; Texas Tech Football

Ownership
- Owner: Cumulus Media; (Cumulus Licensing LLC)
- Sister stations: KARX; KNSH; KPUR-FM; KQIZ; KZRK-FM

History
- First air date: 1939 (as KFDA at 1230)
- Former call signs: KFDA (1939–1966)
- Former frequencies: 1230 kHz (1939-late 1940s)

Technical information
- Licensing authority: FCC
- Facility ID: 72037
- Class: B
- Power: 5,000 watts (day); 1,000 watts (night)
- Transmitter coordinates: 35°7′20.2″N 101°48′10.7″W

Links
- Public license information: Public file; LMS

KPUR (1440 AM) is a radio station serving the Amarillo, Texas, area. This station is under ownership of Cumulus Media. Its studios are located at the Amarillo Building downtown on Polk Street, and its transmitter tower is based southeast of Amarillo in unincorporated Randall County along Loop 335 (Hollywood Road).

== History ==
KPUR was once KFDA on 1230 kHz. It hit the air in 1939. After World War II, Amarillo station KGNC moved from 1440 kHz to 710 kHz with greater power. KFDA filed to move to the vacated 1440 raising power from 250 watts on 1230 to 5,000 watts days and 1,000 watts nights. Night used a three tower directional antenna system. The call letters changed to KPUR in 1966. The station was sold by former television partner KFDA-TV (and Texas State Network interests) to Charlie Jordan, the manager at the time.

The towers were located east of Amarillo just south of the former Route 66 (now I-40) which shared land with the studios. In the mid seventies the land was largely sold off to shopping center developers. Towers were relocated to the present site. That site was subject to a late 1970s fire when a Harris MW-5 transmitter melted down. The MW-5 used a step up transformer to raise the three phase input power (at 240 volts) to 17,000 volts. The primary wiring had been bundled closely to the secondary wiring and tightly lashed together. When an insulation breakdown allowed the input wiring to arc, the high temperatures allowed the secondary wires to short to the inputs. This caused extremely high circulating currents and a meltdown of the transformer frame (made of metal castings and laminations).

The station is an affiliate of the Dallas Cowboys radio network and the West Texas Friday Night Scoreboard Show.

On March 30, 2012, KPUR changed their format from sports to oldies, branded as "True Oldies". On October 22, 2012, KPUR changed its format back to sports, branded as "ESPN 1440" with programming from ESPN Radio. On January 2, 2013, KPUR switched affiliations from ESPN Radio to CBS Sports Radio, branded as "Sportsradio 1440".

In August 2022, KPUR was discovered to have switched from its sports format to an "All Ag All Day" format. It is unclear as to when exactly this switch happened.

By 2025, KPUR had returned to "Sportsradio 1440", with the Infinity Sports Network (the former CBS Sports Radio) supplemented by a local late morning program, 806 Sports Radio. KPUR went silent in March 2025; it is one of 11 Cumulus stations to close the weekend of March 14, as part of a larger shutdown of underperforming Cumulus stations. Following the closure, 806 Sports Radio moved to sister station KARX on March 24.

In March 2026, KPUR returned to the air and is currently airing a Country music format.
