= WKOR-FM =

- Columbus, Mississippi; United States
- Broadcast area: Columbus-Starkville-West Point
- Frequency: 94.9 MHz
- Branding: 94.9 Nash FM

Programming
- Format: Country
- Affiliations: Westwood One

Ownership
- Owner: Cumulus Media; (Cumulus Licensing LLC)
- Sister stations: WMXU; WNMQ; WSMS

History
- First air date: 1993
- Former call signs: WXZD (1990–1990); WKIR (1990–1993)
- Call sign meaning: "King of Rock"

Technical information
- Licensing authority: FCC
- Facility ID: 24531
- Class: C2
- ERP: 50,000 watts
- HAAT: 150 meters (490 ft)
- Transmitter coordinates: 33°28′38.4″N 88°16′25.1″W

Links
- Public license information: Public file; LMS
- Webcast: Listen live
- Website: nashfm949.com

WKOR-FM (94.9 FM, "94.9 Nash FM") is a country music formatted radio station licensed to Columbus, Mississippi, United States. WKOR is owned by Cumulus Licensing LLC. WKOR serves East Central Mississippi and parts of West Central Alabama with an ERP of 50,000 watts. Cities in the primary coverage area are Columbus, West Point and Starkville, Mississippi.

== History ==
After several years in the AOR & Top 40 formats, respectively, WKOR-FM would change to the popular Hot Country format. The station would also change its frequency from 92.1 to 94.9 and relocate its studios to downtown Columbus and be rebranded as K94.9 under the initial guidance of Rusty Walker Programming. Other on-air talent for K94.9 would include Jodi Roberts, Larry Bond, Dave Richards, Kelli Karlson, Mike Grace, Dalton Middleton, Joel Sargent, Kevin Burchfield, Bill Thurlow, Nikki Steele, and Scotty D.

On February 3, 2014, WKOR-FM along with nine other Cumulus-owned country music stations, made the switch to going under the Nash FM branding.
