= WYZB =

FM radio station in Florida

Coordinates: 30.411861°N 86.6205°W

- Mary Esther, Florida; United States
- Broadcast area: Fort Walton Beach, Florida and Vicinity
- Frequency: 105.5 MHz
- Branding: Y105.5

Programming
- Format: Country
- Affiliations: Westwood One

Ownership
- Owner: Cumulus Media; (Cumulus Licensing LLC)
- Sister stations: WFTW, WKSM, WNCV, WZNS

History
- First air date: 1986

Technical information
- Licensing authority: FCC
- Facility ID: 27469
- Class: C3
- ERP: 25,000 watts
- HAAT: 93 meters (305 ft)

Links
- Public license information: Public file; LMS
- Webcast: Listen Live
- Website: y1055country.com

WYZB (105.5 FM branded as "Y105.5") is a radio station serving the Fort Walton Beach, Florida area with a country music format. This station is under ownership of Cumulus Media.

== History ==
WYZB signed on the air in May 1986 and had several format changes over the years. It first started life with a Top 40 format and later oldies in 1990. The station dropped oldies in 1994 for its current country format.

On March 30, 2023, WYZB rebranded as "Y105.5".

== Previous logo ==
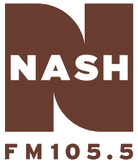
