= WKOS =

Coordinates: 36.554°N 82.450°W

- Kingsport, Tennessee; United States
- Broadcast area: Tri-Cities, Tennessee
- Frequency: 104.9 MHz
- Branding: 104.9 Nash Icon

Programming
- Format: Country

Ownership
- Owner: Cumulus Media; (Radio License Holding CBC, LLC)
- Sister stations: WJCW; WQUT; WXSM

History
- First air date: January 21, 1970
- Former call signs: WGAT-FM (1979–1981); WZXY (1981–1991)

Technical information
- Licensing authority: FCC
- Facility ID: 67674
- Class: A
- ERP: 2,750 watts
- HAAT: 150 meters (490 ft)

Links
- Public license information: Public file; LMS
- Webcast: Listen live
- Website: www.1049nashicon.com

WKOS (104.9 FM), branded as "104.9 Nash Icon", is a radio station serving the Tri-Cities, Tennessee, area with country music. This station is under ownership of Cumulus Media.

== History ==
WGAT-FM began broadcasting on January 21, 1970, as the FM sister station of WGAT (1050 AM). It changed its call sign to WZXY on October 14, 1981, an album-oriented rock station branded "Y105". Sometime in the mid- to late-1980s, WZXY changed its to CHR/Top 40. The call sign was changed to WKOS on July 1, 1991. Through much of the 1990s and a large part of the 2000s, the format was oldies, and then adult hits. The station was called "The Peak" when it changed to hot adult contemporary.

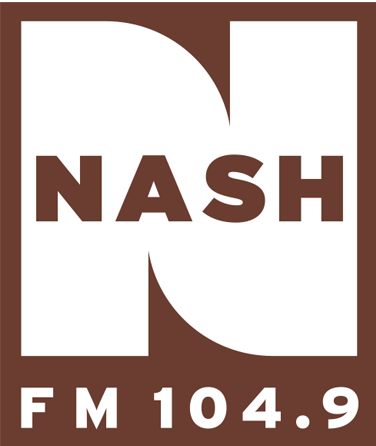
WKOS's logo under previous "Nash FM" branding

On February 24, 2012, WKOS changed formats to country, branded as "Great Country 104.9". On July 3, 2013, at 3:00 p.m. EDT, WKOS re-branded itself as "Nash FM 104.9". On April 24, 2015, WKOS rebranded as "104.9 Nash Icon".

== Sports coverage ==
In 2007, East Tennessee State University men's basketball moved its games from WJCW to WKOS. This marked the first time the team was heard on FM radio. This has since been moved to WXSM, a sister station.

== Pirate radio station "WKOS" in Maine ==
In 1967, the phone hacker Captain Crunch created a radio station called WKOS [W-"chaos"], a pirate station in Dover-Foxcroft, Maine, but had to shut it down when a licensed radio station, WDME, objected.
