= WNMQ =

- Columbus, Mississippi; United States
- Broadcast area: Columbus-Starkville-West Point
- Frequency: 103.1 MHz
- Branding: Q103-1

Programming
- Format: Top 40 (CHR)
- Affiliations: Westwood One

Ownership
- Owner: Cumulus Media; (Cumulus Licensing LLC)
- Sister stations: WKOR-FM; WMXU; WSMS

History
- First air date: 1969 (as WJWF)
- Former call signs: WJWF (1969–1984); WMBC-FM (1984); WMBC (1984–2008)

Technical information
- Licensing authority: FCC
- Facility ID: 54535
- Class: C2
- ERP: 26,500 watts
- HAAT: 207 meters (679 ft)
- Transmitter coordinates: 33°20′41″N 88°32′47″W

Links
- Public license information: Public file; LMS
- Webcast: Listen live; Listen live (via iHeartRadio)
- Website: www.q1031fm.com

WNMQ (103.1 FM, "Q103-1") is a radio station broadcasting a top 40 (CHR) format. Licensed to Columbus, Mississippi, United States, the station serves the Columbus-Starkville-West Point area. The station is owned by Cumulus Media.

== History ==
The station was known as Star 103 with a contemporary hit radio format until April 2005 when it changed to talk as "BC103". That format and branding lasted until September 2006 when a hot adult contemporary format was launched as "103.1 The Spot." In late 2008, WMBC changed calls to WNMQ and became Top 40 "All the Hits Q103".

On August 16, 2010, WNMQ changed its format to sports, branded as "The Team". On January 2, 2013, WNMQ switched affiliations from ESPN Radio to CBS Sports Radio. On July 31, 2017, WNMQ changed its format from sports back to Top 40 (CHR), branded as "Q103.1".
