= KXNA =

- Springdale, Arkansas; United States
- Broadcast area: Fayetteville (North West Arkansas)
- Frequency: 104.9 MHz
- Branding: 104.9 the X

Programming
- Format: Alternative

Ownership
- Owner: John Lykins; (Rox Radio Group, LLC)

History
- First air date: September 19, 1968
- Former call signs: KCIZ (1968–1992); KBEV (1992–1994); KBRS (1994–2000)
- Call sign meaning: K X (station name) North Arkansas (KXNA is also the ICAO code for the local airport)

Technical information
- Licensing authority: FCC
- Facility ID: 71703
- Class: A
- ERP: 2,750 watts
- HAAT: 148 meters
- Transmitter coordinates: 36°10′48″N 94°5′7″W

Links
- Public license information: Public file; LMS
- Webcast: Listen Live

KXNA (104.9 FM) is a radio station broadcasting an alternative format. Licensed to Springdale, Arkansas, United States, it serves the Fayetteville (North West Arkansas) area. The station is currently owned by John Lykins, through licensee Rox Radio Group, LLC.

The station was a finalist for Radio and Records magazine's 2007 Industry Achievement Award for Best Alternative Station for markets 100 and up. Other finalists included WKZQ-FM, WJSE, WBTZ, KQXR, and WSFM.

== History ==
The station debuted on September 19, 1968, as KCIZ-FM. It went through a number of formats. Beginning with Top 40 for its first few years as "Stereo 105", MOR in the late 1970s, adult contemporary in 1983 as "FM 105", and back to Top 40/CHR for five years as "KC105" ("The Hot FM") from 1986 until 1991.

In April 1991, the station dropped CHR altogether and flipped to an easy listening format as "EZ-105". It didn't last very long, and in August 1992, the station dropped its easy listening format for a country format and changed its call sign to KBEV as "Beaver 105" after being LMA'ed to KEZA. In October 1994, the LMA with KEZA ended, and its call sign was changed to KBRS as it picked up the satellite-fed Real Country format following an LMA to KMCK. The station flipped its format to Alternative Rock in 1997, and its current KXNA call sign was introduced in November 2000.

Effective June 1, 2019, KXNA was sold as part of the Rox Radio Group's acquisition of the Hog Radio Group properties including KFMD-FM. Elizabeth Marquis acquired the station's license on January 27, 2021, but sold the station back to Rox Radio Group effective March 31, 2023 in exchange for the cancellation of the debt associated with her 2021 purchase.
