= KARX (FM) =

Coordinates: 35.086°N 101.914°W

Canyon, Texas; United States
- Broadcast area: Amarillo metropolitan area
- Frequency: 107.1 MHz
- Branding: 107.1 Nash Icon

Programming
- Format: Country

Ownership
- Owner: Cumulus Media; (Cumulus Licensing LLC)
- Sister stations: KNSH, KPUR (AM), KPUR-FM, KQIZ, KZRK-FM

History
- First air date: 1981; 45 years ago
- Former call signs: KATP (1985–1988); KHWK (1988–1989); KPUR-FM (1989–2018)

Technical information
- Licensing authority: FCC
- Facility ID: 72038
- Class: A
- ERP: 6,000 watts
- HAAT: 96 meters

Links
- Public license information: Public file; LMS
- Webcast: Listen Live
- Website: 107nashicon.com

KARX (107.1 FM), branded as "107.1 Nash Icon", is a radio station serving the Amarillo, Texas, area with a country music format. This station broadcasts on FM frequency 107.1 MHz and is under ownership of Cumulus Media. Its studios are located at the Amarillo Building downtown on Polk Street, and its transmitter tower is based midway between Amarillo and Canyon proper along I-27 in unincorporated Randall County.

The station is an affiliate of the Dallas Cowboys radio network.

On January 15, 2018, the then-KPUR-FM switched formats with KARX and changed its name from "107.1 The Armadillo" to "107.1 Nash Icon". The stations swapped call signs on January 24, 2018, with KPUR-FM picking up the KARX call sign.
