= KPUR-FM =

Coordinates: 35.105°N 101.658°W

- Claude, Texas; United States
- Broadcast area: Amarillo metropolitan area
- Frequency: 95.7 MHz
- Branding: Texas Country 95.7, The Armadillo

Programming
- Format: Country
- Affiliations: Dallas Cowboys; Texas Tech Football

Ownership
- Owner: Cumulus Media; (Cumulus Licensing LLC)
- Sister stations: KNSH; KARX; KPUR; KQIZ; KZRK-FM

History
- First air date: 1991; 35 years ago (as KARX)
- Former call signs: KQXB (8/1991–9/1991, CP); KARX (1991–2018)

Technical information
- Licensing authority: FCC
- Facility ID: 33448
- Class: C1
- ERP: 100,000 watts
- HAAT: 119 meters (390 ft)
- Repeater: 1440 KPUR (Amarillo)

Links
- Public license information: Public file; LMS
- Webcast: click "play" button at bottom of website
- Website: www.957kpur.com

KPUR-FM (95.7 FM, "Texas Country 95.7, The Armadillo") is a radio station serving the Amarillo, Texas, area with a country format. This station is under ownership of Cumulus Media. Its studios are located at the Amarillo Building downtown on Polk Street, and its transmitter tower is based southeast of Amarillo in unincorporated Randall County.

The station is an affiliate of the Dallas Cowboys radio network.

On January 15, 2018, the then-KARX switched frequencies with KPUR-FM and changed its name from "Nash Icon 95.7" to "Texas Country 95.7, The Armadillo". The stations swapped call signs on January 24, 2018, with KARX picking up the KPUR-FM call sign.
