= KYNG (AM) =

- Springdale, Arkansas; United States
- Broadcast area: Fayetteville and Northwest Arkansas
- Frequency: 1590 kHz
- Branding: The Ticket 2

Programming
- Format: Sports
- Affiliations: Infinity Sports Network

Ownership
- Owner: Cumulus Media; (Cumulus Licensing LLC)

History
- First air date: July 15, 1966
- Former call signs: KSPR (1966–1980); KQXK (1980–1994); KZRA (1994–2005)

Technical information
- Licensing authority: FCC
- Facility ID: 71702
- Class: D
- Power: 2,500 watts day 50 watts night
- Transmitter coordinates: 36°12′25.2″N 94°7′10″W

Links
- Public license information: Public file; LMS
- Webcast: Listen live
- Website: www.theticket1590.com

KYNG (1590 kHz) is a commercial AM radio station licensed to Springdale, Arkansas. The station broadcasts a sports format. The station is currently owned by Cumulus Media. It is programmed along with co-owned 92.1 KQSM-FM as "The Ticket". Both stations carry nationally syndicated sports shows from Infinity Sports Network.

== History ==
The station began broadcasting as KSPR on July 15, 1966. It was owned by Autus Johnson and broadcast during daylight hours only with 500 watts. The station license was transferred to Johnson Communications, Inc., in 1969, shortly before Autus's death. The station increased power to 1,000 watts in 1979 and changed its call sign to KQXK on November 17, 1980.

In March 1991, Moran Communications of Wichita Falls, Texas, took KQXK and KCIZ-FM off the air after a dispute over a mortgage. The stations were then bought by Westark Broadcasting, which installed easy listening formats on both of them. By 1994, the station was broadcasting a Spanish-language format; it then changed its call sign to KZRA that September; the station was known as La Zeta The station's ownership changed several times in the late 1990s. It was owned by the Power Radio Group and Hochman Communications before Cumulus Media acquired the Power cluster in 1998. The station switched call signs with KYNG (950 AM) in Denison, Texas, in 2005. When La Zeta moved off 1590, the station changed names twice, first to La Más Bonita and then to La Máquina Musical, primarily airing Regional Mexican music.

The station switched formats to sports in 2016.
