= KRMW =

Radio station in Cedarville, Arkansas, United States

- Cedarville, Arkansas; United States
- Broadcast area: Northwest Arkansas including Fayetteville and Fort Smith, Arkansas
- Frequency: 94.9 MHz
- Branding: 94.9 Radio Jon/Deek

Programming
- Format: Adult album alternative

Ownership
- Owner: Cumulus Media Inc.; (Cumulus Licensing LLC)

History
- First air date: 1991 (as KDAB)
- Former call signs: KDAB (1991–2003); KFVY-FM (2003); KYNF (2003–2012)
- Call sign meaning: "Warm" (former branding)

Technical information
- Licensing authority: FCC
- Facility ID: 70257
- Class: C2
- ERP: 21,000 watts
- HAAT: 230.9 meters
- Transmitter coordinates: 35°50′49.3″N 94°23′05.9″W

Links
- Public license information: Public file; LMS
- Webcast: Listen live
- Website: 949radiojondeek.com/

KRMW (94.9 FM) is a radio station licensed to Cedarville, Arkansas, United States. It serves the Fayetteville/Fort Smith area. The station is owned by Cumulus Media.

== Formats ==
The 94.9 frequency went through many formats in the 2010s. It started as an adult alternative music format. In 2012 it changed to an adult contemporary radio station as "Warm 94.9." Next, the station flipped to country music under the "Nash FM" umbrella in August 2014. As of 2016, KRMW is an eclectic format branded as "Radio Jon/Deek," named after the only on-air personalities at the station, Jon Williams and Derek "Deek" Kastner.
