= KNSH =

Radio station in Fort Smith, Arkansas

- Fort Smith, Arkansas; United States
- Broadcast area: Fort Smith, Arkansas
- Frequency: 100.7 MHz
- Branding: 100.7 Nash FM

Programming
- Format: Country

Ownership
- Owner: Cumulus Media; (Cumulus Licensing LLC)

History
- First air date: July 1, 1978 (as KXXI at 100.9)
- Former call signs: KXXI (1978–1982); KXXI-FM (1982–1983); KFPW-FM (1983–1986); KBBQ-FM (1986–2005); KLSZ-FM (2005–2020)
- Former frequencies: 100.9 MHz (1978–1993)
- Call sign meaning: "Nash FM"

Technical information
- Licensing authority: FCC
- Facility ID: 23869
- Class: C2
- ERP: 50,000 watts
- HAAT: 140 meters (460 ft)
- Transmitter coordinates: 35°13′32.3″N 94°20′29.7″W

Links
- Public license information: Public file; LMS
- Webcast: Listen live
- Website: nashfm1007.com

KNSH (100.7 FM) is a radio station broadcasting a country music format. Licensed to Fort Smith, Arkansas, United States, it serves the Fort Smith area. The station is owned by Cumulus Media.

== History ==
On January 2, 2013, the then-KLSZ-FM changed their format from mainstream rock to sports, with programming from CBS Sports Radio. Under KLSZ-FM's previous sports format, program director Josh Bertaccini hosted "The Red Zone with JB" weekdays from 7 to 9 am. He has worked for the Ticket since June 2011. The Jim Rome Show aired weekdays afternoons from 11 am to 2 PM, and Doug Gottlieb hosted afternoon drive.

On August 15, 2014, KLSZ-FM changed their format from sports to country, branded as "100.7 Nash Icon".

On October 31, 2016, KLSZ-FM rebranded as "100.7 Nash FM". The KNSH call letters were moved to Fort Smith on February 20, 2020, from a station in Canyon, Texas, whose license was about to be surrendered to the FCC.
