= Cumulus Media =

American radio broadcasting company

Cumulus Media, Inc.
- Type: Private
- ISIN: US2310828015
- Industry: Broadcasting
- Founded: August 1998; 28 years ago
- Founders: Lewis Dickey Jr.; Richard Weening
- Headquarters: Atlanta, Georgia, U.S.
- Key people: Mary G. Berner (CEO, president and director); Frank Lopez-Balboa (EVP, treasurer & CFO); Richard S. Denning (SVP, secretary & general counsel)
- Services: Radio broadcasting
- Revenue: ▼US$844.5 million (FY23)
- Operating income: ▼US$1,035 (FY23)
- Net income: ▼US$18 (FY23)
- Total assets: ▼US$7,009 (FY23)
- Owner: Next Gen Radio Enterprises, LLC (31.86%)
- Number of employees: 3,367 (FY23)
- Subsidiaries: Westwood One
- Website: cumulusmedia.com

Cumulus Media, Inc. is a broadcasting company of the United States and is the second largest owner and operator of AM and FM radio stations in the United States ahead of Audacy and behind iHeartMedia. As of June 2019, Cumulus lists ownership of 428 stations in 87 media markets. It also owns and operates Westwood One. Its headquarters are located in Atlanta, Georgia. Its subsidiaries include Cumulus Broadcasting LLC, Cumulus Licensing LLC and Broadcast Software International Inc.

== History ==
=== Origins ===
Cumulus Media was established in August 1998 by radio consultant Lewis Dickey Jr. and media and technology entrepreneur Richard Weening. The Telecommunications Act of 1996, among other legislation, relaxed media ownership restrictions, allowing a single owner to possess or control an unprecedented number of radio stations per market and nationwide. Dickey, then a nationally known radio programming consultant, was acting as a consultant to a small radio group in which Weening had a personal investment. Weening signed onto Dickey's idea to acquire and operate radio stations in mid-size markets as opposed to the largest markets on which competing radio group Clear Channel Communications was focusing. Dickey was the radio expert and Weening was the corporate finance and start-up CEO. Dickey was president of both radio consulting firm Stratford Research and his family company, Midwestern Broadcasting, with two stations in Toledo, Ohio; these stations would later be acquired by Cumulus. Weening had successful experience as a start-up CEO in book and magazine publishing, online services and enterprise software systems. He was then CEO of Quaestus & Co., Inc., a private equity firm specializing in media and technology startups. For the new radio company, Weening chose the name Cumulus for the type of cloud formation for their ubiquity in the sky, which Weening and Dickey hoped would be the same for their stations across the country. Quaestus provided the seed capital to make the first station acquisitions as a model for the Cumulus business strategy.

The next significant milestone was obtaining a $50 million investment from the State of Wisconsin Investment Board (SWIB), which previously invested in Weening's magazine publishing company. With this capital in place, Cumulus began full-scale operations on May 22, 1997. Weening assumed the role of Executive chairman focusing on acquisitions deal structuring, corporate finance, and internet from the company's original headquarters in Milwaukee, Wisconsin. Dickey selected stations to buy and oversaw radio programming, operations and strategy as Executive vice-chairman. Dickey brought in highly regarded radio operator William Bungeroth to serve as President of Cumulus Broadcasting from new offices in Chicago's Hancock Center. Having a reputation as an advertising sales leader, Bungeroth oversaw market-level tactical execution, including the integration of newly acquired stations into market operating units. John Dickey, brother of Lewis and himself an experienced radio programming consultant. would oversee station content.

SWIB's investment was soon followed by another $50 million from Wisconsin-based Northwestern Mutual Life Insurance Company and $25 million from NationsBank Capital Corporation. With this financial backing secured, Dickey and Weening began acquiring radio stations yet managed to stay "under the radar", not attracting much notice or competition. In its first 12 months in operation, Cumulus acquired over 100 stations in 31 markets. Soon it was clear that the company would need over a billion dollars for its desired acquisitions, and an initial public offering of stock was soon made.

The Cumulus strategy, as articulated in public filings, was to acquire multiple stations in a city or market, consolidate them physically to share a common infrastructure to reduce operating expenses but enrich programming. Each station would be programmed with a unique music format, live programming, brand, and target audience. The central idea was to create a cluster of radio stations that could compete with newspapers by offering advertisers a range of target demographic choices comparable to the range of content sections in print. At the time of Cumulus' founding, newspaper display and classified advertising claimed the largest share of local advertising dollars. By offering a range of audiences like newspapers, Cumulus could gain a greater share of the local advertising dollar than the individual stations could garner separately. In addition, acquiring the top-performing stations in a given market as part of the operating cluster would yield more national advertising. The market focus would be on those deemed to offer substantial growth opportunities, while the station focus was the leading station in the market and other stations well-positioned for significant growth.

=== Initial public offering and accelerating acquisitions ===
Cumulus became a publicly traded company on June 26, 1998. The company raised $400 million selling 7.6 million common shares at $14.00 each, $125 million in preferred stock, and $160 million in Senior Subordinated Bonds. At that time Cumulus owned or was committed to buy 176 stations – 124 FM stations and 52 am stations in 34 U.S. markets. In its first 17 months, Cumulus acquired 207 stations, creating the first mid-size market radio conglomerate. Following the company's IPO, its stock fell from $14 to $8 per share on October 2, 1998, before beginning a climb to close 1999 at $50.75. Some radio executives familiar with small markets thought that Cumulus was overpaying to buy top stations in markets that did not have a great upside potential.

For 1998, Cumulus reported revenue of $98.8 million, with broadcast cash flow of $26.6 million. Its cash-flow margin reached 27 percent. For 1999, Cumulus reported $180 million in revenue and $46.7 million broadcast cash flow. On November 19, 1999, Cumulus sold an additional 10 million shares at $24.93, raising $250 million. Acquisitions continued at an accelerating pace. At this point, the company owned or operated pending closing 246 stations in 45 markets. In a period of two years and six months, Cumulus became the second largest U.S. broadcasting group in terms of stations operated. It also raised a staggering $1.3 billion when considering sales of common and preferred stock shares, senior bank lines of credit, and senior subordinated debt or junk bonds which when issued were rated CCC+. The stock market acknowledged the remarkable growth with a share price that rose to a high of $51.00 on December 31, 1999.

Since November 1998, the company had been developing an internet platform for classified employment advertising. The new system would operate in tandem with the radio station cluster in each market and offer employers the chance to post available positions on the web and promote their company and the position on the radio stations. At the time of the dot-com bust, the system was in beta test in two markets. One of the short-lived but important impacts of the dot-com bubble burst was a loss of confidence that the promise of the internet would ever happen. Many professional radio people like Dickey were skeptical and believed the best course for Cumulus was to focus on the radio strategy and drop the internet projects. Weening who had started a Silicon Valley e-commerce software company in the early 1990s had conceived and was overseeing development of the employment platform. Weening advocated for continuance of the project as a key potential source of revenue with a service that would be unique among radio companies. Ultimately, the board backed Dickey not Weening and the Internet project was scrapped.

The first quarter of 2000 proved to be troubling at Cumulus. A perfect storm of events drove the company's share price from $50 to $13 between January 1 and March 17 when over 30 million shares traded hands. Driving the decline was persistent rumours of possible accounting irregularities in the rapidly assembled radio group. On January 14, respected Wall Street analyst Frank Bodenchak advised institutional clients that Cumulus may miss his estimates for Q4 1999 and the year. A combination of the possible earnings miss and the rumours of accounting problems created a significant loss of investor confidence.

On March 17, Cumulus reported a loss of $0.20 per share vs $0.15 per share expectation. Broadcast cash flow was $12.3 million vs estimates around $17 million. In addition the Company reported that company CFO Rick Bonick had left earlier in January. It was not officially announced a fact that CNN Money says "roiled the already active rumour mill about accounting irregularities. The company also reported it would restate quarterly revenues in 1999 as some markets did not comply with Cumulus' revenue recognition policies and booked some advertising contracts for their full value rather than recognizing revenue as the ads aired. As a result, class-action lawsuits were filed against Cumulus charging the company with artificially inflating revenue and profit in 1999. PricewaterhouseCoopers, the company's auditors resigned in April citing material weaknesses in the Cumulus' financial controls arising from the possible revenue restatements. Meanwhile, Dickey had taken over day-to-day station operations from Bungeroth who resigned in mid January.

During this same period, Weening got into a dispute with the SEC over his proposal to reverse some of his and Dickey's 1999 compensation to help offset the earnings miss. While the proposal was never implemented, the SEC maintained it would have amounted to earnings management and was therefore an infraction. Weening finally agreed to pay a fine of $75,000 without conceding wrongdoing to settle the matter in 2003.

As the dust began to settle in April 2000, the company issued revised annual 10K reports for 1998 and 1999 that showed minor variations in quarterly revenue and adjusted net loss for 1999 from $20.8 million to $13.6 million and net loss for 1998 was restated from $13.7 million to $8 million, after the company found a $4.9 million tax benefit that had been under-reported. The restatement as it turns out had no material impact on the financials but in the context of the dot-com bust hysteria rumours of accounting irregularities drove a significant decrease in share price which threatened the company's ability to finance pending acquisitions.

Lew Dickey and his brother John convinced the board to let them run the company. Dickey, whose family had just sold an Atlanta station for a reported $250 million, offered to invest in Cumulus if needed to close pending acquisitions. The board was concerned about the restatement of revenues and the shareholder lawsuits. This is consistent with reports in a radio industry newsletter which reported that it was a widely held belief in the Radio industry was that the Dickey brothers orchestrated events that lead to the board's decision not to back the Internet project, placing Dickey at the helm of Cumulus, moving the Cumulus headquarters from Milwaukee to Atlanta and to Weening's ultimate resignation as an employee and director in January 2001. According to public filings Weening, QUAESTUS management company and other Weening related interests sold their interests in Cumulus a year later in May 2002 at prices ranging from $17 to $21.50 per share not The $55 high but considerably higher than share prices after their sale.

By May 2002, the share price recovered to above the IPO price to a short-lived high of $22 on May 31, 2002. Dickey garnered some strong partners in the form of Bain Capital and Crestview partners who helped finance a series of ambitious acquisitions and partnerships which were creative, made Cumulus a significantly larger company but these acquisitions and Cumulus itself have struggled in the face of slow to no radio ad growth.

In 2006, Cumulus acquired control of Susquehanna Radio, with the backing of 3 venture capital firms (Bain Capital Partners LLC, The Blackstone Group and Thomas H. Lee Partners, L.P.) for a price of $1.2 Billion. The 33 Susquehanna stations were privately held in a separate partnership called Cumulus Media Partners, LLC (commonly referred to as CMP on the company's quarterly earnings calls) that was the subject of an equity-for-debt swap in May 2009 in an attempt to avoid defaulting on the terms of the CMP lending agreement. While Cumulus operated the CMP stations, they initially held only a minor ownership interest in them. On January 31, 2011, Cumulus announced a deal to acquire the remaining ownership of CMP from its equity partners in a stock transaction valued at approximately $740 million that is closed in August 2011. As a result of the CMP acquisition, Cumulus now owns a limited-partnership interest in San Francisco Baseball Associates LP, the owner of the San Francisco Giants baseball club.

In July 2007, the company announced its intention to go private, however on May 11, 2008, the company announced it was unable to come to terms with the parties involved and the merger/acquisition agreement was terminated.

The company's stock, priced over $56 in 1999, then over $22 in 2004, was as low as $0.45 per share toward the end of 2008.

On December 30, 2008, Cumulus Media was issued a $14,000 Notice of Apparent Liability by the Federal Communications Commission related to the stations in the Macon, Georgia, cluster. According to the FCC, Cumulus failed to comply with record-keeping requirements and its Equal Employment Opportunity rules regarding information on recruitment sources. Cumulus, along with two other companies, had 30 days to pay or file a statement asking for reduction or cancellation of the forfeitures.

In July 2010, Cumulus publicly announced formation of a similar venture with Crestview Partners to acquire up to $1 billion of additional radio assets.

=== 2010s ===
==== Acquisition of Citadel Broadcasting and Dial Global ====
Starting in June 2010, Cumulus made multiple unsuccessful offers to buy out Citadel Broadcasting after its emergence from bankruptcy. In February 2011, Cumulus was again said to be in "exclusive negotiations" to acquire Citadel for $2.5 billion paid to Citadel shareholders; some shareholders were said to have been pushing the board to consider a sale. On March 10, 2011, Citadel announced that it had agreed to be sold to Cumulus for $2.4 billion, including 225 stations and the Citadel Media radio network

Broadcasting stations announced via email that Cumulus had purchased Citadel Broadcasting. Citadel was made up of 225 radio stations in over 50 markets, as well as Citadel Media, one of the largest radio networks in the United States; it included the stations that made up the former ABC Radio group (like flagship stations KABC-AM, WLS-AM and WABC-AM). The deal was finalized on September 16, 2011, after approval by the FCC and Citadel's shareholders. Cumulus Media placed 14 stations into a separate trust to comply with ownership limits. Following the acquisition, in an effort to focus on larger markets, Cumulus reached a deal with Townsquare Media to swap 65 radio stations in 13 markets, with the majority of the 65 stations being sold to Townsquare.

On August 29, 2013, it was reported by The Wall Street Journal that Cumulus would purchase the syndicator Dial Global for $260 million. To fund the sale, Cumulus sold 53 more stations to Townsquare Media for $238 million. Additionally, Townsquare Media acquired Peak Broadcasting, and Cumulus swapped 15 more stations in Dubuque, IA and Poughkeepsie, NY in exchange for Peak Broadcasting's Fresno cluster. The sale to Cumulus was completed on November 14, 2013. Ahead of the completion of the sale, Dial Global adopted the heritage Westwood One branding.

==== Nash, Westwood One News launch, bankruptcy and station sales ====
On January 11, 2013, after acquiring the station from Family Radio, Cumulus re-launched WFME in New York City as a country music station under its new Nash FM brand. Nash was designed to serve as an umbrella brand for all country music-related content across the company's properties, including radio, digital, and live events such as the "Nash Bash". All country stations owned by Cumulus would either be branded as Nash FM, or be strongly cross-promoted as part of the Nash family of properties.

In July 2014, Cumulus announced that it would end its partnership with ABC News Radio, and enter into a new partnership with CNN to syndicate news content for its stations through Westwood One News beginning in 2015. The network would provide its content on a white label basis, allowing individual stations to use their own brands for the content. In turn, ABC announced that it would take the syndication of its radio content in-house, with distribution handled by Skyview Networks.

On September 15, 2013, Cumulus announced that it had entered into a partnership with music streaming service Rdio; Cumulus took a stake in Rdio, and provided the company with access to its advertising sales team for a freemium tier, the ability to offer Cumulus radio stations on the Rdio service, and $75 million in marketing on Cumulus stations over five years. The stations launched on Rdio in August 2015; prior to the deal, Cumulus partnered with the competing iHeartRadio service. However, in November 2015, Rdio filed for bankruptcy and sold its assets to Pandora Radio.

In July 2015, Cumulus merged Westwood One with Cumulus Media Networks, with Westwood One as the surviving brand. The consolidation resulted in a number of layoffs from Westwood One's Colorado headquarters, with Cumulus stating that it would utilize talent from its major market stations for its 24-hour formats, and that it would offer vacancies at its stations to airstaff who were laid off as part of the merger.

In September 2015, Mary G Berner became the new CEO of Cumulus. In April 2016, Talk Radio Network filed a lawsuit against Cumulus Media and associated defendants, alleging "antitrust violations, unfair competition, breach of contract and breach of fiduciary duty, among other claims", similar to a lawsuit launched in 2012 and dropped in 2014 by the same plaintiff. In June 2016, Cumulus Media and Westwood One moved to have the new suit dismissed.

In January 2016, the FCC's Enforcement Bureau reached a "record-setting" $540,000 settlement with Cumulus over sponsorship identification in radio ads promoting a proposed energy project, reported to be the largest payment in FCC history for a single-station violation of the Commission's sponsorship ID laws. In August 2019, the FCC proposed Cumulus Media pay another $233,000 fine for additional violations of its sponsorship identification rules and not reporting them to the FCC after agreeing to do so under its 2016 consent decree.

In June 2016, Cumulus Media announced the resignation of its executive vice president, treasurer and chief financial officer, Joseph P. Hannan, to "pursue other interests" after six years with the company, to be replaced by John F. Abbot. It had previously been reported in April 2016 that Cumulus was "going to great lengths to keep two of its executives on board" and that Hannan had been offered "a big bonus to stay" as incentive to remain with the company. In October 2016, it was announced Hannan had taken the role of chief financial officer at programmatic advertising company, Social Reality, Inc.. Per SEC filings, Hannan would also "assist the company for several months to ensure a smooth transition". Noble Financial Analyst Michael Kupinski was reported to say that the resignation of CFO JP Hannan for John Abbot was "not a good sign" for the company and as a result of the change, a restructuring was likely.

On November 29, 2017, Cumulus filed for Chapter 11 bankruptcy as part of a restructuring of the company. Cumulus exited bankruptcy on June 4, 2018. In February 2019, Cumulus announced the sale of six stations (including, most prominently, WPLJ in New York City) to the Educational Media Foundation for $103.5 million, and that it would trade WNSH in New York, and WMAS-FM and WHLL in Springfield to Entercom in exchange for WZPL, WNTR, and WXNT in Indianapolis. In June 2019, Cumulus also announced that it would sell WABC to business magnate John Catsimatidis for $12.5 million.

=== 2020s ===
In August 2020, Cumulus disclosed that it had sold its tower sites to Vertical Bridge for $213 million in a sale and leaseback agreement. On January 6, 2021, in response to attempts to overturn the 2020 United States presidential election and the U.S. Capitol attack, Cumulus Media executives directed its on-air personalities to stop spreading misinformation about unsubstantiated claims of Biden stealing the election or face termination.

In August 2021, Cumulus adopted a COVID-19 vaccine mandate for all employees; this resulted in the dismissal or resignation of a number of employees in October 2021. That month, Dan Bongino (who launched an afternoon show with Westwood One to replace The Rush Limbaugh Show on Cumulus stations) threatened to leave the company over the mandate on behalf of the rank and file staff impacted, saying "you can have me or you can have the mandate. But you can't have both of us." Cumulus declined to comment. A spokesperson for Bongino stated that he had received a COVID-19 vaccine upon the advice of his doctors due to his Hodgkin lymphoma—which Bongino would also confirm in an interview with The New Yorker in December 2021. In December 2022, Bongino announced he would not renew his contract when it expires in 2024, but later reversed course and signed a multi-year renewal with Westwood One the following year. He would leave the company in February 2025 after accepting a nomination to become deputy director of the FBI, but returned in 2026 after his resignation from the post.

On February 15, 2023, Cumulus Media paid "$1 million to settle a lawsuit filed by seven former employees who said the fee practices and investment selections of the company's 401(k) plan violated [the Employee Retirement Income Security Act]." In June 2023, Cumulus sold WDRQ in Detroit to Family Life Radio.

On May 9, 2023, former WKIM morning co-host Bob Boccia sued Cumulus over its COVID-19 vaccine mandate, accusing the company of violating the Americans with Disabilities Act and Title VII of the Civil Rights Act of 1964 by failing to accommodate his Crohn's disease and religious beliefs. On December 1, 2023, former WNKT host Tim Hill filed a similar lawsuit. Hill's case was settled in December 2024 without going to trial, while Boccia's case was tossed after he abruptly refused to communicate with his lawyers or the court.

In August 2023, Cumulus-owned Susquehanna Radio sued two former employees of KTCK, Dan McDowell and Jake Kemp, seeking to impose a temporary restraining order (TRO) on them after they refused to comply with a cease and desist order, in which the company claimed that production of The Dumb Zone podcast by the two former radio hosts violated the noncompete agreements in their contracts barring them from competing with their former employer. In September 2023, the case was resolved after US District Judge Karen Gren Scholer ruled that Susquehanna had failed to meet the "burden of persuasion" to have a TRO granted, and the podcast was allowed to resume production.

On March 5, 2026, Cumulus Media filed for Chapter 11 bankruptcy for the second time in nearly a decade, listing assets and liabilities between $1 billion and $10 billion. On April 15, 2026, Cumulus received court approval from a bankruptcy judge to reduce its debt load by $592 million and going private by transferring ownership of the company to new lenders. Cumulus claimed that it filed for bankruptcy primarily due to a legal dispute with Nielsen Audio, following a lawsuit in October 2025, with Cumulus claiming that Nielsen was "leveraging its dominance over national and local radio audience data to charge inflated prices and force radio companies to buy data they did not need or want."

The company emerged from bankruptcy in October 2026. Alden Global Capital director Heath Freeman would become the primary shareholder of Cumulus post-bankruptcy, holding a 31.86% voting share via Next Gen Radio Enterprises, LLC. It was anticipated that Cumulus would undergo major job cuts following the buyout, following a similar practice to Alden's newspapers; although Cumulus agreed to retain its newsroom staff for at least two years after the completion of the buyout, no such guarantee was offered to other staff. The company underwent a reduction in workforce in August 2026, resulting in the layoffs of various on-air and support positions. These layoffs continued into November 2026 after the completion of the buyout.

== Leadership ==
=== Current ===
Board of directors

- Andy Hobson (Chairman of the Board)
- Mary Berner (President & CEO)
- Matthew Blank (Board Member)
- Tom Castro (Board Member)
- Deborah Farrington (Board Member)
- Joan Gillman (Board Member)
- Brian Kushner (Board Member)

Executive leadership

- Mary Berner (President & CEO)
- Richard Denning (EVP, Secretary & General Counsel)
- Frank Lopez-Balboa (EVP, Chief Financial Officer)

== See also ==
- List of radio stations owned by Cumulus Media
