= WOSH-TV =

Television station in Oshkosh, Wisconsin (1953–1954)

- Oshkosh, Wisconsin; United States
- Channels: Analog: 48 (UHF)

Programming
- Affiliations: Independent (July–December 1953); ABC (December 1953–1954)

Ownership
- Owner: Oshkosh Broadcasting Co.
- Sister stations: WOSH

History
- Founded: November 26, 1952
- First air date: July 1, 1953
- Last air date: March 23, 1954

Technical information
- Transmitter coordinates: 44°02′45″N 88°31′45″W

WOSH-TV (channel 48) was a television station in Oshkosh, Wisconsin, United States. It was the first ultra high frequency (UHF) television station in the state of Wisconsin, and the third television station of any kind on the air in the state, after NBC affiliate WTMJ-TV in Milwaukee in 1947 and CBS (now ABC) affiliate WBAY-TV in Green Bay in March 1953.

== History ==
WOSH-TV was granted a license to operate on November 26, 1952, shortly after the Federal Communications Commission (FCC) ended a three-year freeze on the creation of new television licenses in the United States, and began broadcasting at 4 p.m. local time on July 1, 1953 with 100 watts of power, expected to be increased to 1 kilowatt later in the year. The station shared its call letters with sister AM radio station WOSH, and broadcast from the same tower. WOSH-TV gained an affiliation with ABC on December 26, 1953.

WOSH-TV faced several issues as 1954 began. UHF tuners, which had already gained a reputation for poor reception and tuning, were not in enough households in the WOSH broadcast area to attract advertisers, and were not a requirement on new television sets, most of which were very high frequency (VHF) only.

Additionally, as was soon discovered generally, UHF stations did not have the same broadcast characteristics as more established VHF stations; their signals did not travel as far with similar transmission power. All of these factors, along with new competition in the form of newly announced VHF stations WMBV-TV (channel 11, now WLUK-TV) and WFRV-TV (channel 5) (meaning consumers in the area had even less reason to purchase television sets that were UHF capable) proved to be too much for WOSH-TV, and it announced it would cease broadcasting on March 23, 1954, citing a lack of advertisers and general difficulties with being a UHF broadcaster. The market also began a slow consolidation of station transmitters into the Green Bay area, specifically Scray Hill in the Town of Glenmore to provide one point of reception, rather than multiple towers down the Fox River and Lake Winnebago.

The only other UHF station in northeast Wisconsin at this time, WNAM-TV, announced in November 1954 that it would merge its operations with WFRV-TV, which had yet to sign on. UHF television would not return to the market until 1968 when KFIZ-TV went on the air in Fond du Lac; that station was shut down in 1972.
