= Fox 32 =

Fox 32 may refer to one of the following television stations in the United States affiliated with the Fox Broadcasting Company:

== Current ==
- WFLD in Chicago, Illinois (O&O)
- WFQX-TV in Cadillac, Michigan

== Former ==
- WXGZ-TV/WACY in Appleton–Green Bay, Wisconsin (1986–1992)
