= WCWF =

Television station in Suring, Wisconsin

ATSC 3.0 station
- Suring–Green Bay–Fox Cities, Wisconsin; United States
- City: Suring, Wisconsin
- Channels: Digital: 15 (UHF); Virtual: 14
- Branding: CW14

Programming
- Affiliations: 14.1: The CW / Fox (alternate) / ABC (secondary); for others, see § Subchannels

Ownership
- Owner: Sinclair Broadcast Group; (WCWF Licensee, LLC)
- Sister stations: WLUK-TV

History
- Founded: July 27, 1981
- First air date: February 22, 1984
- Former call signs: WSCO (1984–1998); WPXG (1998–1999); WIWB (1999–2010)
- Former channel numbers: Analog: 14 (UHF, 1984–2009); Digital: 21 (UHF, until 2020)
- Former affiliations: Religious WVCY-TV (1984–1987, 1993–1997); Dark (1987–1993); inTV (1997–1998); Pax TV (primary 1998–1999, secondary 1999–2004); The WB (1999–2006); UPN (September 2006, temporary CW transitional)
- Call sign meaning: "Wisconsin's CW 14"

Technical information
- Licensing authority: FCC
- Facility ID: 73042
- ERP: 700 kW
- HAAT: 360 m (1,181 ft)
- Transmitter coordinates: 44°24′32″N 87°59′31″W

Links
- Public license information: Public file; LMS
- Website: cw14online.com

WCWF (channel 14) is a television station licensed to Suring, Wisconsin, United States, serving the Green Bay area as an affiliate of The CW. It is owned by Sinclair Broadcast Group alongside Fox affiliate WLUK-TV (channel 11). The two stations share studios on Lombardi Avenue (US 41) on the line between Green Bay and Ashwaubenon; WCWF's transmitter is located on Scray Hill in Ledgeview.

== History ==
The station launched on February 22, 1984, as religious independent station WSCO-TV, under the ownership of Northeastern Wisconsin Christian Television Incorporated. The station's former analog transmitter was located outside of the unincorporated Oconto County community of Krakow, four miles (6 km) north of Pulaski on WIS 32. Financial problems would force the station off the air by 1987; VCY America would purchase the station's license that year and return it to the air by 1993 as a sister station to Milwaukee's WVCY-TV with religious and home shopping programming. On April 30, 1997, Paxson Communications (now Ion Media Networks) purchased the station and converted it to a paid programming format under Paxson's inTV service. On August 31, 1998, WSCO became a charter owned-and-operated station of Pax TV (later i: Independent Television, now Ion Television) under the new call sign WPXG (for "Pax Green Bay").

On June 2, 1999, Paxson sold WPXG to ACME Communications; the station immediately became a primary WB affiliate and changed its call sign to WIWB, originally branded as "WB 14" and later "Wisconsin's WB" (The WPXG-TV callsign has been moved to a TV station in Manchester, New Hampshire). Before it joined the network, WB programming in Northeastern Wisconsin was previously seen either through cable providers that carried Chicago-based superstation WGN and/or Milwaukee's WVTV or during off hours on UPN affiliate WACY-TV (channel 32; Kids' WB programming aired as part of WACY's children's lineup). WIWB also continued to air Pax programming in the mornings, overnights and weekends for a few years after ACME's purchase was finalized; it would drop that network by 2004, at which time the station's programming lineup adopted a more general entertainment format that was heavily reliant on sitcom reruns and court shows, in addition to WB programming. Pax TV's successor, Ion Television, would not return to the market over-the-air until November 2015, when WBAY-TV launched it on their DT3 subchannel.

On January 24, 2006, the Warner Bros. unit of Time Warner and CBS Corporation announced that the two companies would shut down The WB and UPN and combine the networks' respective programming to create a new "fifth" network called The CW. Due to ACME's ownership by former WB executive Jamie Kellner, WIWB's pursuit of the CW affiliation was assumed to be a formality. Indeed, on March 9, 2006, ACME Communications affiliated most of their stations with The CW, including WIWB. The station officially joined the network upon its September 18, 2006, launch. Prior to that date, it temporarily carried not only WB programs, but also shows from UPN after WACY-TV dropped UPN before that network's closure to join MyNetworkTV. At the time, ACME decided not to change the callsigns of any of their WB-to-CW affiliates to avert any further confusion from the launch of the two new networks.

On June 4, 2010, LIN TV Corporation, owner of Green Bay's Fox affiliate WLUK-TV, as part of an agreement with ACME Communications in three markets where both companies owned stations, announced that it would begin to operate WIWB through separate shared services and joint sales agreements; WLUK would provide WIWB with technical, engineering, promotional, administrative and other operational support services, as well as joint advertising sales for the two stations. As part of its agreements with ACME, LIN TV had the option to purchase WIWB, an option it exercised in September 2010, purchasing not only WIWB but another CW station in a similar arrangement, Dayton, Ohio's WBDT. LIN TV included in its license transfer request to the Federal Communications Commission a "failing station waiver", an indication that the station was in an economically non-viable position and that FCC should relax ownership limits that apply to the Green Bay market so that Channel 14 could stay on the air; that limit (found in CFR§73.3555(b)(2) of the FCC's rules) permits ownership duopolies in markets with at least eight full-power stations, whereas Green Bay has only seven (Journal Communications would also seek a waiver in its 2012 purchase of WACY-TV, which has been operated through Journal-owned WGBA-TV since 1994).

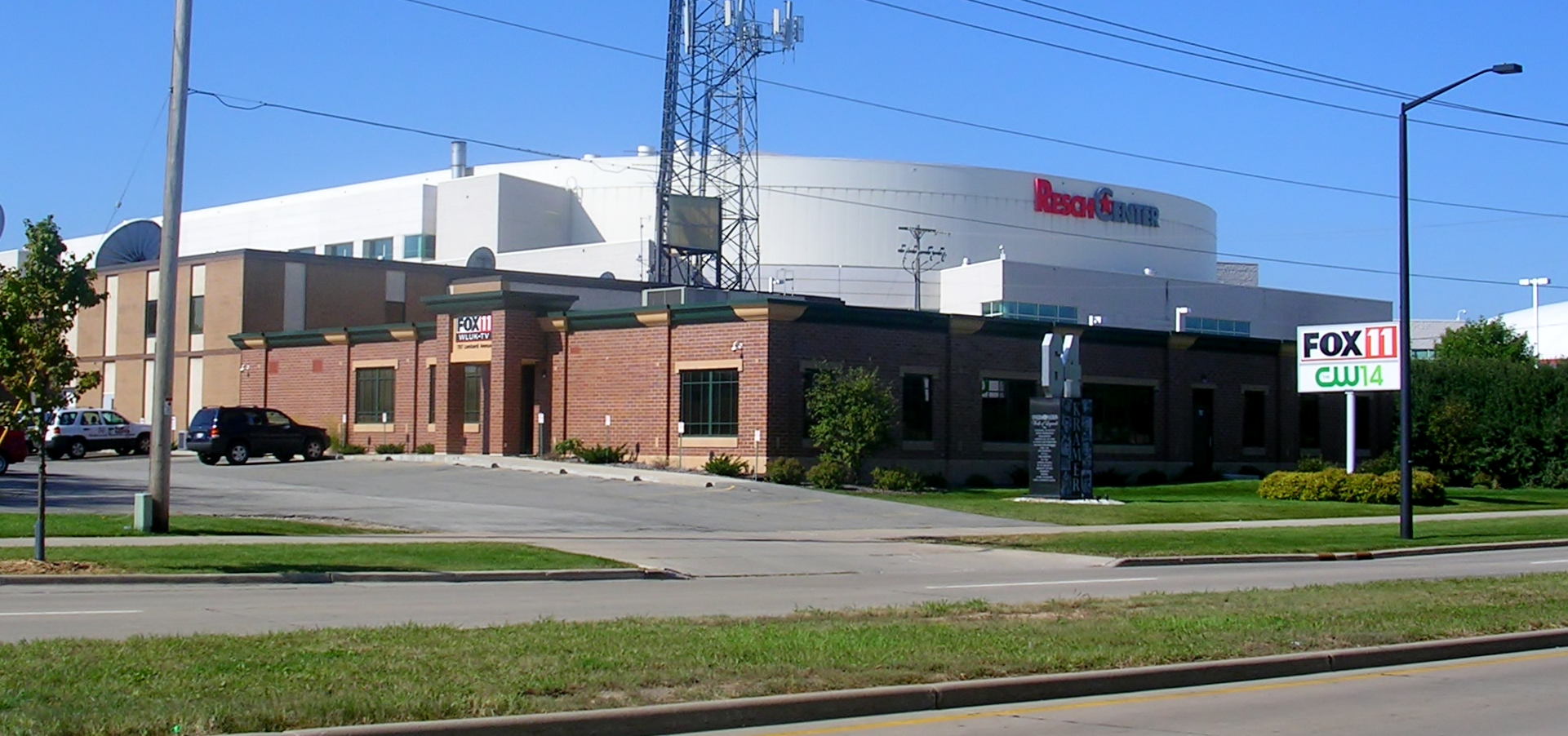
The studios of WCWF and its sister station, WLUK-TV.

In April 2011, the FCC approved the ownership transfer of WCWF from ACME to LIN TV, also applying the requested failing station waiver. Additionally, the FCC denied a petition from Time Warner Cable, the dominant cable provider in Northeast Wisconsin; the FCC dismissed as speculative TWC's claims that higher retransmission fees for WCWF, when paired with those for WLUK, would result from LIN TV's purchase of the station, and that LIN's collective retransmission plans for both stations did not violate FCC rules. The sale of WCWF to LIN was consummated on May 20, 2011.

Almost immediately after taking control of WIWB, LIN TV would make changes at the station, starting with relocating its operations from the Parkview Plaza strip mall in suburban Ashwaubenon to WLUK's studios on Lombardi Avenue. During August and September 2010, the station would undergo changes in both on-air branding (from "Wisconsin's CW" to "CW14") and call sign (from WIWB to WCWF). Also in the fall of 2010, WCWF would upgrade syndicated programming to high-definition (which already occurs on WLUK), while both WCWF and WLUK would begin hourly cross-promotions of each other's programming. In mid-November 2010, WCWF's website was switched from being managed by ACME's webhost, Desert Bloom Productions, to LIN Media Interactive (LIN Media's branding for EndPlay, formerly Fox Interactive Media).

On March 21, 2014, LIN Media entered into an agreement to merge with Media General in a $1.6 billion deal. Because Media General already owned ABC affiliate WBAY-TV (which was acquired in 2013 as part of Media General's merger with Young Broadcasting), the companies were required to sell either WLUK or WBAY to another station owner in order to comply with FCC ownership rules as well as planned changes to those rules regarding same-market television stations which would prohibit sharing agreements.

On August 20, 2014, Media General announced that it would keep WBAY and sell WLUK and WCWF, along with WJAR in Providence and WTGS in Savannah, to Sinclair Broadcast Group in exchange for Sinclair stations in Tampa Bay (WTTA), Harrisburg (WHTM) and Colorado Springs (KXRM-TV and KXTU-LD). As part of its acquisition, Sinclair announced it would seek a continuation of the FCC rules waiver allowing the joint ownership of WCWF and WLUK. WHTM's sale of Media General was explored nearly two months earlier, and it was completed, nearly three months before the Media General/LIN deal was completed. The sale was completed on December 19.

== Programming ==
WCWF is used as a "shadow station" for WLUK programming preempted due to extended breaking news or severe weather coverage, or network programming (mainly sports events) that overruns into or is scheduled to preempt regular programs; for example, 9 p.m. newscasts on WLUK that are preempted for Fox Sports broadcasts will air on WCWF (in prior years, WLUK leased access on a Time Warner Cable channel for its preempted newscasts).

=== Sports programming ===
Beginning in 2016, the station acquired local rights to the Wisconsin Interscholastic Athletic Association state basketball and hockey championships as part of Quincy Media's statewide network of stations, taking over from longtime partner WACY-TV. Since March 2016, WCWF has aired two NBA on ABC games during the first weekend in March in lieu of WBAY, which instead carries its annual telethon for local cerebral palsy research and medical care.

In the summer of 2018, the station began to carry weekend home games for the Midwest League's Wisconsin Timber Rattlers, the Grand Chute–based Class A affiliate for the Brewers. The games are produced by WLUK for WCWF, and also air on WVTV-DT2 in Milwaukee.

=== Locally-produced content ===
From December 2008 to June 2010, WIWB featured Daily Buzz inserts called "Buzzed Into the (920)" (named for the telephone area code for Green Bay and the Fox Cities). "Buzzed" was patterned after then-sister station WBUW's "Buzzed Into Madison" and featured an on-air presenter (originally Kristen Rietz, later Kari Merchant) profiling positive stories and features on news, events, businesses and personalities in the Green Bay/Fox Cities area. "Buzzed Into the (920)" was dropped when WLUK took over WCWF's operations, although past installments are still available on the feature's YouTube channel.

Existing local content on WCWF, in addition to the occasional WLUK news broadcast, includes a Sunday morning airing of the polka music show Polka, Polka, Polka. LIN Media, after taking control of WCWF, would add severe weather bulletins; the weekly prep football highlight show High School GameTime in August 2011; and, in late 2011, CW 14 Focus, a Sunday morning local public affairs program that debuted in order to fulfill local programming requirements; it is hosted by WLUK reporter Robert Hornacek.

Also added in 2011 was the position of "CW 14 Star", who represents the station on-air, online, and at community events. Maria Parmigiani was selected as the first "Star" during the first quarter of 2011, earning the job after an audition process, an appearance on WLUK's Good Day Wisconsin, and an online voting process. Parmigiani was succeeded by Katie Phernetton in 2013 after a similar audition and selection process.

== Technical information ==
=== Subchannels ===
The station's ATSC 1.0 channels are carried on the multiplexed signals of other Green Bay television stations:

Subchannels provided by WCWF (ATSC 1.0)
Subchannel	Res.	Short name	Programming	ATSC 1.0 host
14.1	1080i	WCWF-CW	The CW	WLUK-TV
14.2	480i	Comet	Comet	WFRV-TV
14.3	480i	Charge!	Charge!	WBAY-TV
14.4	480i	Nest	The Nest	WACY-TV
14.5	480i	QUEST	Quest	WACY-TV

=== Analog-to-digital conversion ===
On December 12, 2008, the station replaced its digital transmitter antenna due to a wavering signal and recommended that viewers perform a channel rescan to restore the WIWB's digital signal if they lost reception. WCWF (as WIWB) ended regular programming on its analog signal, over UHF channel 14, on February 17, 2009, the original date on which full-power television stations in the United States were to transition from analog to digital broadcasts under federal mandate (which was later pushed back to June 12, 2009). The station's digital signal remained on its pre-transition UHF channel 21, using virtual channel 14.

As part of the SAFER Act, WCWF kept its analog signal on the air until March 4 to inform viewers of the digital television transition through a loop of public service announcements from the National Association of Broadcasters. On May 6, 2009, due to the station's close proximity to the Canada–United States border, the U.S. FCC and the Canadian Radio-television and Telecommunications Commission (CRTC) issued a conditional approval of WIWB's construction permit to expand its coverage area by increasing power. The approval was needed in order to work with interference problems resulting from PBS member station WCMW across Lake Michigan in Manistee, Michigan, sharing channel 21 and to address the concerns of interference in local health care facilities' radiological equipment. The increase in power was applied on September 8, 2009, and station officials asked viewers to rescan for the signal.

In mid-November 2011, the station experienced major problems with its transmitter and LIN's technical staff had to take the station off the air for several days to repair the problem. As there was no backup fiber optic link to Time Warner Cable, the station was not available to cable viewers either, and as neither of LIN's stations in Green Bay carried any subchannels at the time, WLUK was unable to offer WCWF's programming over a backup 11.2 signal. The station was unable to get permission from The CW to carry the two nights of network programming missed during the shutdown and referred viewers to the network's website and Hulu to watch the missed shows.

=== ATSC 3.0 lighthouse ===
Subchannels of WCWF (ATSC 3.0)
Subchannel	Res.	Short name	Programming
2.1	720p	WBAY	ABC (WBAY-TV)
5.1	1080p	WFRV	CBS (WFRV-TV)
11.1	720p	WLUK	Fox (WLUK-TV)
11.10	1080p	T2	T2
11.11		PBTV	Pickleballtv
11.20		GMLOOP	GameLoop
14.1	1080p	WCWF	The CW
26.1	1080p	WGBA	NBC (WGBA-TV)

Subchannel broadcast with digital rights management
Subchannel streamed via the Internet

WCWF originally planned to start ATSC 3.0 transmissions on October 27, 2021, to serve as the host of the 1080p 3.0 signals of the market's commercial stations. With this, its subchannels are disbursed in ATSC 1.0 form in their existing quality among other Green Bay stations. The transition was later delayed at the last minute to January 25, 2022, several days after a hacking incident which affected Sinclair's operations nationwide.

== See also ==
- WLUK-TV
