= WFRV-TV =

Television station in Green Bay, Wisconsin

- Green Bay, Wisconsin; United States
- Channels: Digital: 22 (UHF); Virtual: 5
- Branding: Local 5

Programming
- Affiliations: 5.1: CBS; for others, see § Subchannels

Ownership
- Owner: Nexstar Media Group; (Nexstar Media Inc.)

History
- Founded: January 26, 1954
- First air date: May 20, 1955
- Former call signs: WNAM-TV (1954–1955)
- Former channel numbers: Analog: 42 (UHF, 1954–1955), 5 (VHF, 1955–2009); Digital: 39 (UHF, until 2019)
- Former affiliations: ABC (1954–1959, 1983–1992); NBC (1959–1983); DuMont (secondary, 1955)
- Call sign meaning: "Wonderful Fox River Valley"

Technical information
- Licensing authority: FCC
- Facility ID: 9635
- ERP: 1,000 kW
- HAAT: 363.9 m (1,194 ft)
- Transmitter coordinates: 44°20′0.1″N 87°58′55.7″W

Links
- Public license information: Public file; LMS
- Website: www.wfrv.com

WFRV-TV (channel 5) is a television station in Green Bay, Wisconsin, United States, affiliated with CBS. Owned by Nexstar Media Group, the station maintains studios on East Mason Street in Green Bay and a transmitter north of Morrison, Wisconsin.

WFRV-TV traces its history to WNAM-TV, which began broadcasting in January 1954 from studios in Neenah. Owned by the Neenah-Menasha Broadcasting Company, it was the only ultra high frequency (UHF) outlet in northeastern Wisconsin at a time when UHF stations faced severe technical and economic handicaps against very high frequency (VHF) stations. At the end of 1954, WNAM-TV suspended operations and merged with the Valley Telecasting Company, a consortium of area investors that had obtained the construction permit for channel 5 in Green Bay. The new station, WFRV-TV, debuted on May 20, 1955, from the former WNAM-TV studios in Neenah and became owned entirely by Neenah-Menasha. In January 1957, the station opened its present studios in Green Bay. Originally an affiliate of the ABC network, the station switched to NBC in 1959.

From 1960 to 1980, WFRV-TV was owned by the Morton and Norton families of Louisville, Kentucky, under the aegis of what eventually became known as Orion Broadcasting. In 1969, the company opened WJMN-TV (channel 3) in Escanaba, Michigan, which served as a semi-satellite of WFRV for the central Upper Peninsula of Michigan. When Orion Broadcasting and Cosmos Broadcasting merged, WFRV and WJMN were divested to Midwest Radio and Television, which owned WCCO-TV in Minneapolis. Midwest switched the station's affiliation back to ABC in 1983 and invested in the news department. Midwest was acquired by CBS in 1991. This resulted in another affiliation switch in Green Bay on March 15, 1992, with ABC moving to WBAY-TV (channel 2). CBS continued to own WFRV-TV until 2007, when it traded the Green Bay and Escanaba stations to Liberty Media in exchange for shares of its stock.

Nexstar acquired WFRV and WJMN in 2011. WFRV added several new newscasts and a lifestyle show in the years following the purchase. WJMN was also given more local news programming; that station lost its CBS affiliation in January 2022 and was sold by Nexstar in 2024.

== History ==
=== WNAM-TV and VHF merger ===
WNAM-TV began telecasting from Neenah on ultra high frequency (UHF) channel 42 on January 26, 1954, after beginning test transmissions in December 1953. Owned by the Neenah-Menasha Broadcasting Company alongside radio station WNAM (1280 AM), WNAM-TV carried programming from ABC beginning in July 1954.

Meanwhile, in April 1952, 17 local businessmen formed the Valley Telecasting Company to apply for channel 6, which had been allocated to Green Bay. Three months later, the Green Bay Newspaper Company, owner of the Green Bay Press-Gazette newspaper and radio station WJPG, switched its application to specify channel 6 instead of channel 2. That switch left the application of WBAY-TV uncontested on channel 2, allowing the Federal Communications Commission (FCC) to grant it, and sent channel 6 to a comparative hearing situation. In December 1953, acting on a petition from the Hearst Corporation, the FCC moved the channel 6 allocation to Whitefish Bay, near Milwaukee. Hearst had applied for a Milwaukee TV station but was shut out by the redesignation of channel 10 there for educational use. Moving channel 6 to Whitefish Bay required it to be replaced with channel 5 at Green Bay and channel 5 at Marquette, Michigan, to be changed to channel 6.

On March 10, 1954, the Green Bay Newspaper Company withdrew its application for channel 5, and the FCC granted a construction permit to Valley Telecasting Company the next day. By this time, there was an additional VHF station under construction in the region, WMBV-TV on channel 11. Meanwhile, UHF stations were struggling. WOSH-TV of Oshkosh closed down the same month; its owners claimed that national and regional advertisers were content with VHF stations to reach the area and cited the forthcoming advent of channels 5 and 11, which together with WBAY-TV would provide all three major networks. Sensing that the arrival of Valley Telecasting—which had selected the call letters WFRV-TV for its station to represent the "Wonderful Fox River Valley"—would economically harm its UHF station, Neenah-Menasha agreed to merge with Valley Telecasting in November and announced it would suspend operations of WNAM-TV on the evening of January 2, 1955. The combined station would retain some operations at Neenah for program production in the Fox Cities, but it would use the tower and transmitter building of the former WJPG-FM on Scray's Hill, southeast of De Pere.

WFRV-TV signed on channel 5 on May 20, 1955, after an appeal lodged by WMBV-TV to block the merger of Valley Telecasting and Neenah-Menasha was declined for the final time; the station aired film programming for its first ten days before beginning affiliations with ABC and DuMont Television Network on June 1. While the transmitter facility was new, WFRV-TV used WNAM-TV's Neenah studios. DuMont ceased network operations four months later. By 1956, Neenah-Menasha owned all of WFRV-TV; that same year, the company announced plans to build a studio base in Green Bay. Master control switched to Green Bay in December when a new tower and transmitter building were activated, and production from the station's present Mason Street studios began in mid-January 1957.

WFRV-TV was the Green Bay station in the short-lived Badger Television Network, which operated in 1958 and also included Milwaukee's WISN-TV and Madison's WKOW-TV. The next year, on February 1, the station changed affiliations from ABC to NBC. Later that year, the station claimed to be the first ever to show coverage of a live lunar eclipse. To capture the event, a studio camera was wheeled out into the station parking lot.

=== Orion Broadcasting ownership ===
In December 1960, Valley Telecasting sold WFRV-TV to Valley Broadcasting Company, a subsidiary of WAVE-TV at Louisville, Kentucky, for $1.09 million. WFRV's first attempt at expanding to the Upper Peninsula, a construction permit to build channel 8 at Iron Mountain, Michigan, was scrapped at the company's request days after the sale, as was an application by the company to build a channel 9 station at Wausau.

Channel 5 began to broadcast local programming in color in the fall of 1965, making it the second station (behind WBAY-TV) with that capability in the market. Two years later, the station began its move to build a satellite in the Upper Peninsula when it filed for channel 3 at Escanaba, Michigan, on June 20, 1967. As a result of an attempt by Northern Michigan University to build an educational station on the wider-coverage channel 3 instead of the allocated channel 13, nearly two years passed before a construction permit was granted on April 23, 1969. From a transmitter site near Trenary, WJMN-TV—so designated in honor of Jane Morton Norton, chairman of the board of the company—began broadcasting October 7, bringing a full NBC lineup and WFRV-TV's signal to a further 50,000 households. That same year, WAVE, Inc. renamed itself Orion Broadcasting in reflection of its broadcasting holdings beyond Louisville.

=== Midwest ownership ===
Orion Broadcasting reached a deal to merge with Cosmos Broadcasting, a subsidiary of the Liberty Corporation, in 1980. The merger would put the combined company over the limit for the number of VHF television stations it could own, prompting it to immediately announce that it would divest WFRV/WJMN. In January 1981, Cosmos found a buyer: Midwest Radio-Television, owners of WCCO radio and television in Minneapolis. The transaction closed in October.

After taking over, Midwest made $1 million in major investments in new equipment, including a news helicopter. On October 25, 1982, the station announced it would end its 23-year association with NBC and return to the then-stronger ABC in 1983, after ABC began courting channel 5, which had been one of NBC's strongest affiliates. One potential complication emerged when it was discovered that WFRV's affiliation agreement had just been automatically renewed through February 1985. It was not until March 1983 that outgoing ABC outlet WLUK-TV and NBC reached an affiliation deal, which allowed the switch to take place on April 18.

=== CBS purchase and affiliation switch ===
On July 23, 1991, CBS announced that it would purchase the entirety of Midwest Communications, Inc. The deal gave the company WCCO radio and television in Minneapolis, but it also gave CBS an ABC affiliate—WFRV/WJMN—in a market smaller than any in which the company was operating. In the immediate aftermath of the $200 million acquisition, the network sent out mixed messages: CBS executive Peter Lund said the company had decided to keep the Green Bay station, yet an affiliate relations official told longtime CBS affiliate WBAY-TV that the network would be interested in remaining there if a buyer were to be found.

The sale dislodged the existing CBS affiliates in the Green Bay and Marquette markets, WBAY-TV and WLUC-TV. The switch in Green Bay took place March 15, 1992—just over a month after CBS closed on the Midwest purchase—with WBAY becoming the ABC outlet. In Marquette, where CBS angered WLUC-TV by notifying it on February 5 that it was terminating the affiliation agreement in July, that station switched to ABC on February 23, prompting WJMN to change to CBS three weeks early (and be fed CBS programs from the control room in Green Bay).

WFRV was unaffected by the 1995 switch that saw WLUK-TV and WGBA-TV swap affiliations. The station was the first in Green Bay to launch a digital television signal, in 2002.

=== Spinoff to Liberty Media ===
In April 2007, Liberty Media (a media company unrelated to The Liberty Corporation and a spin-off of former cable television company TCI) completed an exchange transaction with CBS Corporation pursuant to which Liberty Media exchanged 7.6 million shares of CBS Class B common stock valued at $239 million for a subsidiary of CBS that held WFRV and WJMN and approximately $170 million in cash As part of the transaction, Liberty Media acquired WFRV and WJMN, becoming the only over-the-air television properties to be owned by the company.

WFRV-TV shut down its analog signal, over VHF channel 5, on February 17, 2009, the original target date on which full-power television stations in the United States were to transition from analog to digital broadcasts under federal mandate (which was later pushed back to June 12, 2009). The station's digital signal remained on its pre-transition UHF channel 39, using virtual channel 5.

=== WFRV under Nexstar ===
On April 7, 2011, Nexstar Broadcasting Group announced it would acquire WFRV and WJMN-TV from Liberty Media for $20 million. The deal was approved by the FCC on June 28, 2011, and closed three days later on July 1, when Nexstar appointed Joseph Denk to become vice president and general manager of both stations. Denk replaced Perry Kidder, a 37-year employee of the station, who announced his retirement shortly after the sale was announced. Nexstar also relaunched the station's website using a new domain and digital brand of "WeAreGreenBay.com".

Nexstar also moved to increase the local content of WJMN in the Upper Peninsula. A station that had long merely rebroadcast WFRV-TV's newscasts or maintained a minimal reporting and weather presence in northern Michigan, WJMN launched separate local newscasts at 6 and 11 p.m. on March 13, 2014. At that time, it branded as "Local 3", matching WFRV, which had taken on the "Local 5" moniker in 2012.

On January 27, 2016, Media General announced that it had entered into a definitive agreement to be acquired by Nexstar. Because Media General owned WBAY, the new company was required to sell that station or WFRV to another owner. On June 3, Nexstar announced it had opted to keep WFRV and would sell WBAY along with another merger divestiture, KWQC-TV in Davenport, Iowa, to Gray Television for $270 million.

In 2022, WJMN disaffiliated from CBS in the Marquette market, which moved to WZMQ (channel 19) and replaced the CBS programs with programming from MyNetworkTV as well as Nexstar-owned diginets Antenna TV and Rewind TV, to fill time where CBS programming formerly resided. The station also extended its existing 6 p.m. newscast to one hour and moved its 11 p.m. newscast to 10 p.m. Nexstar sold WJMN-TV to Sullivan's Landing, LLC in 2024; the new owner contracted with Morgan Murphy Media, owner of Marquette-market ABC affiliate WBUP, which led to that company combining the two stations' operations and newsrooms.

In mid-November 2026 the station quietly announced the move of its digital presences from "WeAreGreenBay.com" and a return to the WFRV.com domain (which had remained under Nexstar's control as a redirect over the last fifteen years), a process that had started several months before with the launch of its connected TV app on Roku and Apple TV (and associated extended news and sports programming) under the WFRV+ brand. Nexstar also unveiled a new station logo which currently remains exclusive to social media.

== Programming ==
=== News operation ===
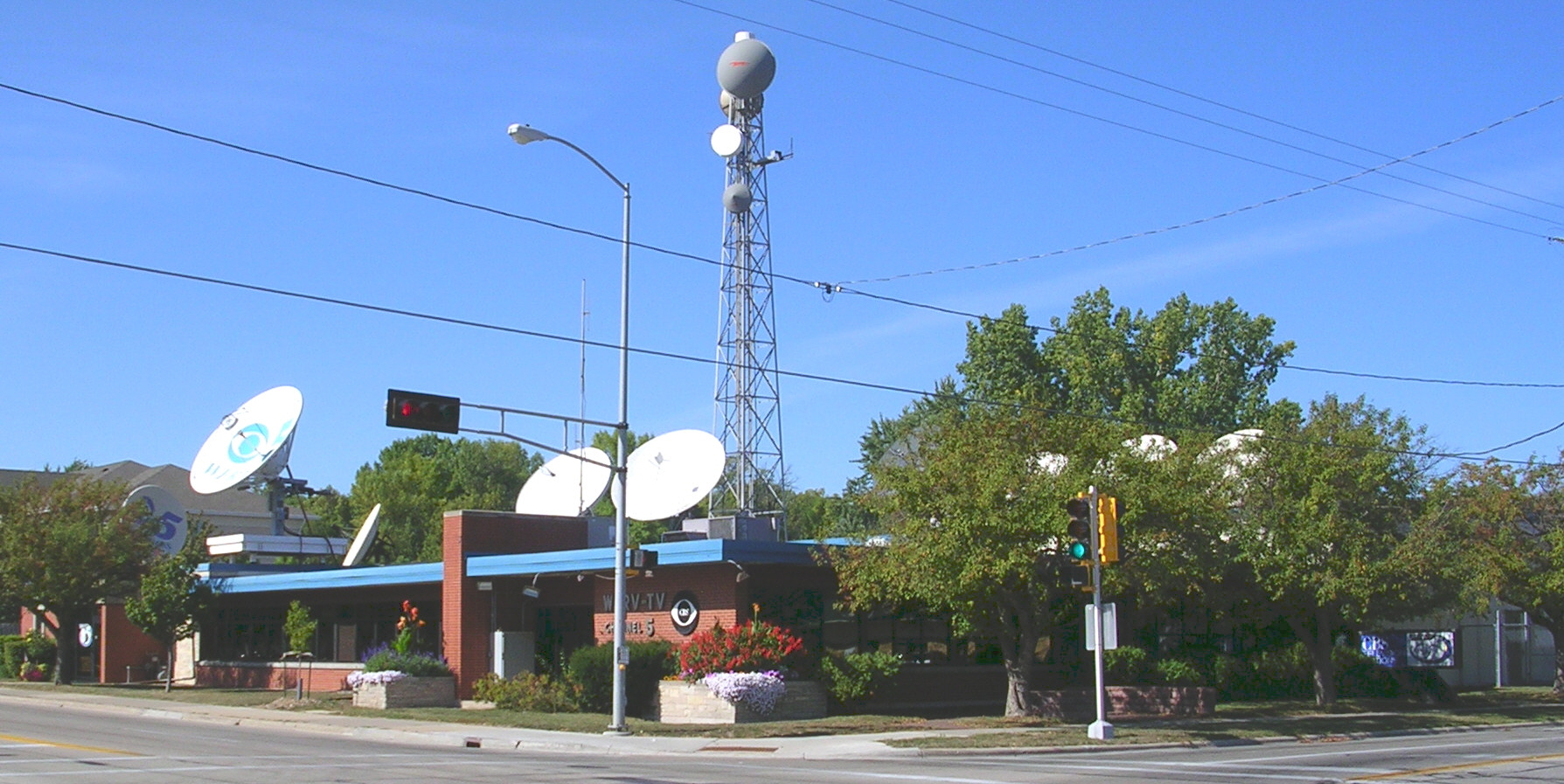
WFRV's primary studios and weather radar in Green Bay

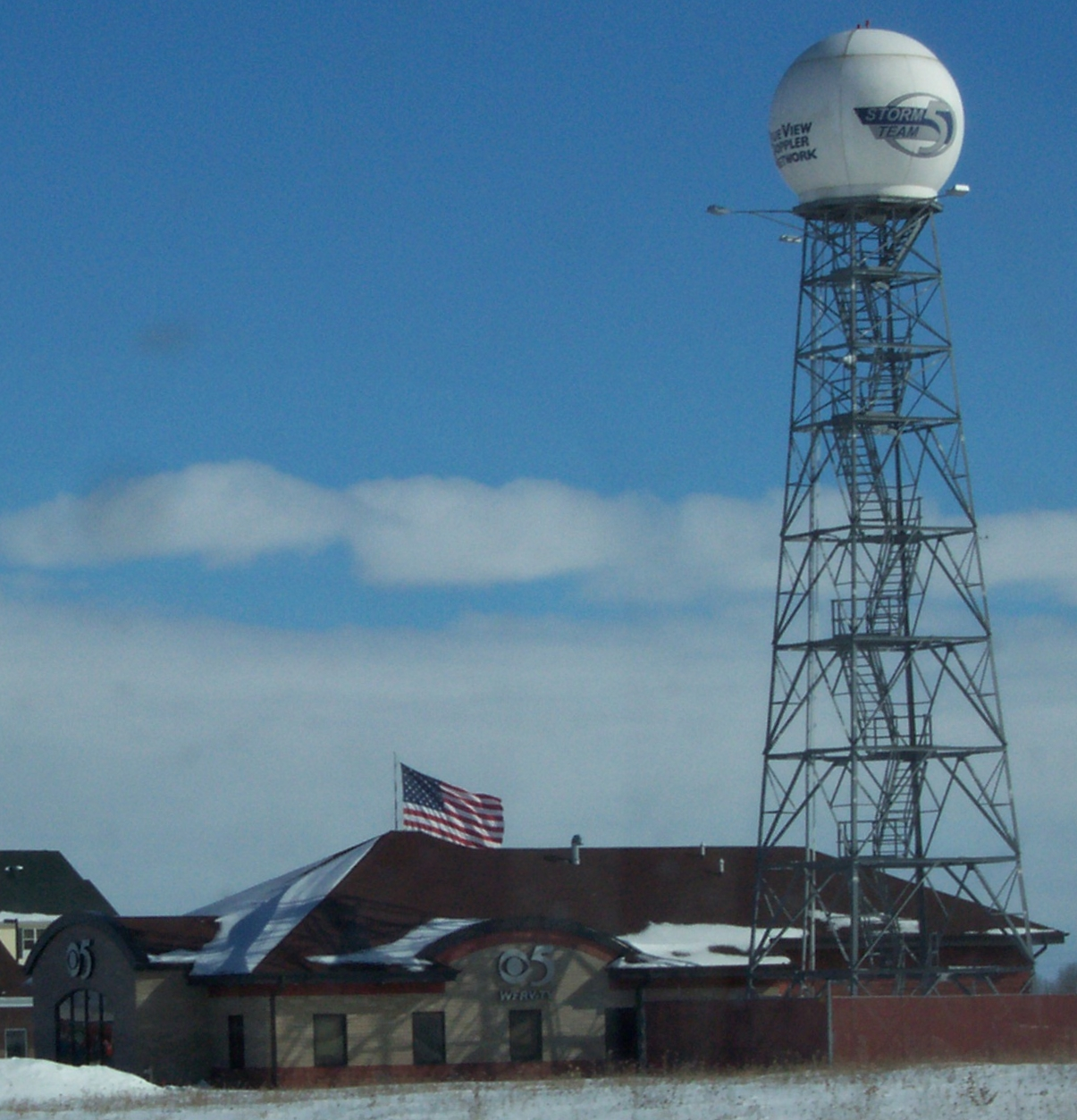
WFRV's Fox Valley Bureau and weather radar

WFRV has typically been the second- or third-rated station for local news in the Green Bay market, which is usually led by WBAY-TV.

In the early 1980s, WFRV was the first local station to start a full news bureau in the Fox Cities area, which at the time accounted for a third of the newsroom budget. Where the original news bureau was in the reporter's apartment, by 1983 the station had dedicated facilities, including a microwave link for sending stories back to Green Bay. In 2004, the station moved its Fox Valley facility to a site on Patriot Drive in Little Chute, equidistant from downtown Appleton and downtown Green Bay, and equipped it with the area's only Doppler weather radar.

On June 23, 2011, after a six-month upgrade process, WFRV became the first station in the Green Bay market to begin broadcasting its local newscasts in high definition; the changeover to HD included upgraded weather systems, including real-time street-level radar. Beginning in September 2012, WFRV greatly expanded its local news output, including the addition of an hour-long afternoon newscast at 4 p.m. and the expansion of its 6 p.m. newscast from 30 minutes to one hour; the 6 p.m. newscast was reduced to 30 minutes during the National Football League (NFL) season on nights when WFRV aired Packers-related programming. The station launched an hour-long local mid-morning program, Local 5 Live!, in 2013.

=== Sports programming ===
WFRV has historically been a major producer of programming around the Green Bay Packers. In 1988, the station hired former Packers center Larry McCarren to serve as a sportscaster. By 1990, McCarren was hosting a weekly program on the team, Packers Locker Room. McCarren was elevated to sports director when he signed a new long-term contract with channel 5 in 1994; this came even as CBS lost NFL rights. In 2003, WFRV acquired the rights to preseason telecasts, which had belonged locally to WBAY-TV for decades; McCarren appeared on the telecasts.

After the Packers left WFRV for a deal with WGBA-TV (and a renewal with Milwaukee's WTMJ-TV) in 2012, McCarren soon followed; he resigned his duties as sports director of WFRV to move to WTMJ/WGBA as a Packers analyst, becoming WGBA's official sports director on April 1, 2013. McCarren left WGBA in 2015 and became a team employee.

==== Notable former on-air staff ====
- Ross Becker – reporter in the 1970s
- Cindy Hsu – Fox Valley anchor and reporter, 1991–1993
- Jay Johnson – anchor, 1980–1986
- Rob Stafford – reporter and weekend anchor

== Subchannels ==
WFRV-TV broadcasts from a transmitter north of Morrison, Wisconsin. The station's signal is multiplexed:

Subchannels of WFRV-TV
Subchannel	Res.	Short name	Programming
5.1	1080i	WFRV-HD	CBS
5.2	480i	Bounce	Bounce TV
5.3	480i	TruCrim	True Crime Network
5.4	480i	MovieSG	MovieSphere Gold
14.2	480i	Comet	Comet (WCWF)

Broadcast on behalf of another station

WFRV gradually added several diginets to its lineup in the 2010s. Bounce TV was added in 2016 as part of a group deal made with Katz Broadcasting, while True Crime Network debuted in April 2020.
