= Ben Tracy =

American journalist (born 1976)

- Born: Benjamin Sampair Tracy; July 16, 1976 (age 50); St. Paul, Minnesota, U.S.
- Education: Marquette University; Saint Thomas University
- Occupation: Writer
- Years active: 1990s–present
- Notable work: CBS Evening News, CBS Mornings, and CBS News Sunday Morning
- Partner: Mark Gustafson
- Website: instagram.com/bentracysnaps

Benjamin Sampair Tracy (born July 16, 1976) is an American journalist known for his work as a national correspondent for CBS News from January 2008 until September 2024. He served as CBS's White House correspondent from 2019 to 2020, and was the network's senior environmental correspondent, based in Los Angeles.

== Early life and education ==
Tracy was born in St. Paul, Minnesota. He graduated from St. Thomas Academy, and later from Marquette University with Bachelor's degrees in broadcast journalism and political science, and with a Master's degree in public service.

== Career ==
Tracy was a reporter for WCCO-TV, the CBS-owned station in Minneapolis, where he was a member of the station's investigative team, covering many major stories, including the methamphetamine epidemic and the collapse of the 35W bridge.

During that time, he was also a contributor to the Saturday Early Show, to which he brought his signature "Good Question" segment, started at WCCO-TV, to a national audience. Tracy also reported for the CBS Evening News with Katie Couric on the collapse of the I-35W bridge and flooding in southern Minnesota.

Before joining WCCO-TV, Tracy worked as a reporter at WISN-TV Milwaukee and WBAY-TV Green Bay, Wisconsin. He is the recipient of five Emmy Awards and the Alfred DuPont-Columbia award for excellence in broadcast journalism.

== Controversy ==
On October 5, 2020, Tracy criticized the lack of adherence he observed at the Trump White House to public health guidelines to slow the spread of the COVID-19 pandemic "I felt safer reporting in North Korea than I currently do reporting at The White House. This is just crazy. For context folks, this is in reference to the COVID-19 outbreak at The White House." The tweet garnered nearly 195,000 "Likes", as well as swift criticism from Republicans.
