= WLUK-TV =

Television station in Green Bay, Wisconsin

- Green Bay–Fox Cities, Wisconsin; United States
- City: Green Bay, Wisconsin (Note: Originally licensed to Marinette, Wisconsin; moved to Green Bay in 1959.)
- Channels: Digital: 18 (UHF); Virtual: 11
- Branding: Fox 11

Programming
- Affiliations: 11.1: Fox; 11.2: Antenna TV; 11.3: Roar

Ownership
- Owner: Sinclair Broadcast Group; (WLUK Licensee, LLC)
- Sister stations: WCWF

History
- First air date: September 10, 1954
- Former call signs: WMAM-TV (CP, 1953); WMGB-TV (CP, 1953–1954); WMBV-TV (1954–1959)
- Former channel numbers: Analog: 11 (VHF, 1954–2009); Digital: 51 (UHF, 2000–2009), 11 (VHF, 2009–2020), 12 (VHF, 2020–2022); Translator: W40AN-D Escanaba, MI (until 2018)
- Former affiliations: NBC (1954–1959, 1983–1995); ABC (1959–1983); NET/PBS (Sesame Street, 1970–1972)
- Call sign meaning: "Lucky 11" (original on-air slogan)

Technical information
- Licensing authority: FCC
- Facility ID: 4150
- ERP: 500 kW
- HAAT: 384 m (1,260 ft)
- Transmitter coordinates: 44°24′32″N 87°59′31″W

Links
- Public license information: Public file; LMS
- Website: fox11online.com

WLUK-TV (channel 11) is a television station in Green Bay, Wisconsin, United States, affiliated with the Fox network. It is owned by Sinclair Broadcast Group alongside Suring-licensed CW affiliate WCWF (channel 14). The two stations share studios on Lombardi Avenue (US 41) on the line between Green Bay and Ashwaubenon; WLUK-TV's transmitter is located on Scray Hill in Ledgeview.

== History ==
=== Early years with NBC and ABC ===
WMBV-TV, licensed to Marinette, Wisconsin (the callsign stood for "Marinette, Bay, Valley"), was approved for VHF channel 11 on November 18, 1953. M & M Broadcasting Company, owned by William Walker, announced the license grant after settling with a competing company for the rights to the license. An affiliation with NBC was confirmed on March 9, 1954. WMBV-TV signed on the air on September 10, 1954. Walker sold the station to Morgan Murphy Stations in 1958.

There were several changes for the station in 1959. On February 1, WMBV swapped affiliations with WFRV-TV (channel 5), becoming an ABC affiliate. The station changed its city of license to Green Bay and on August 22, 1959, changed its call sign to WLUK-TV (in reference to its then on-air slogan "Lucky 11"), when it began broadcasting at full power from a new tower near Green Bay. WLUK first broadcast network programs in color in 1959 and local programs began to be broadcast in color starting in 1965. Morgan Murphy then sold WLUK to Post Corporation (a small media chain not affiliated with The Washington Post Company or its Post-Newsweek Stations division), whose properties included the Post-Crescent newspaper in nearby Appleton and a sister station in Marquette, Michigan, WLUC-TV. in 1965. In 1966, WLUK built a new studio and office building on Highland Avenue, which would eventually become Lombardi Avenue in 1968 after Vince Lombardi resigned his head coaching duties with the Green Bay Packers. It aired some local entertainment programs, including a Saturday night polka show and a daily children's cartoon show using the franchised Bozo the Clown character.

On April 18, 1983, WLUK reclaimed the market's NBC affiliation, when WFRV switched to ABC. In 1984, Racine native George N. Gillett's Gillett Broadcasting purchased Post Corporation. Gillett in turn sold the station to Burnham Broadcasting later that year, as the company's first television acquisition, in order to purchase the KKR stations (which included future fellow Fox station WITI in Milwaukee; WLUK was sold due to adjacent market ownership regulations at the time by the Federal Communications Commission (FCC)). For most of its second stint with NBC, WLUK largely downplayed its affiliation, even during the network's powerhouse days of the 1980s; it used the NBC Peacock only sparingly in the station's advertisements.

=== Fox affiliate ===
On July 29, 1994, Burnham Broadcasting sold WLUK-TV to SF Broadcasting—a joint venture of Savoy Communications and the Fox Broadcasting Company, then a division of News Corporation—for $38 million; the company later sold three of its other four stations (KHON-TV in Honolulu, WVUE in New Orleans and WALA-TV in Mobile, Alabama) for $229 million on August 25 (a fifth Burnham station, KBAK-TV in Bakersfield, California, was excluded from the deal and was instead spun off to Westwind Communications, a new company that was formed by several former Burnham executives). As a result of the deal, SF Broadcasting announced that the four stations would become Fox affiliates; both Savoy and Fox shared ownership with Fox originally choosing to hold voting stock, ultimately opting not to retain it prior to the closure of the sale of the stations. The purchase was challenged by NBC, which filed a petition with the FCC on September 23, 1994, alleging that News Corporation had improperly set up a shell corporation to circumvent FCC limits on the amount of monetary capital that a foreign company is allowed to invest in an American television station in order to gain control of WLUK. NBC later withdrew its petition against the acquisition on February 17, 1995. The FCC approved the WLUK purchase on April 27, 1995.

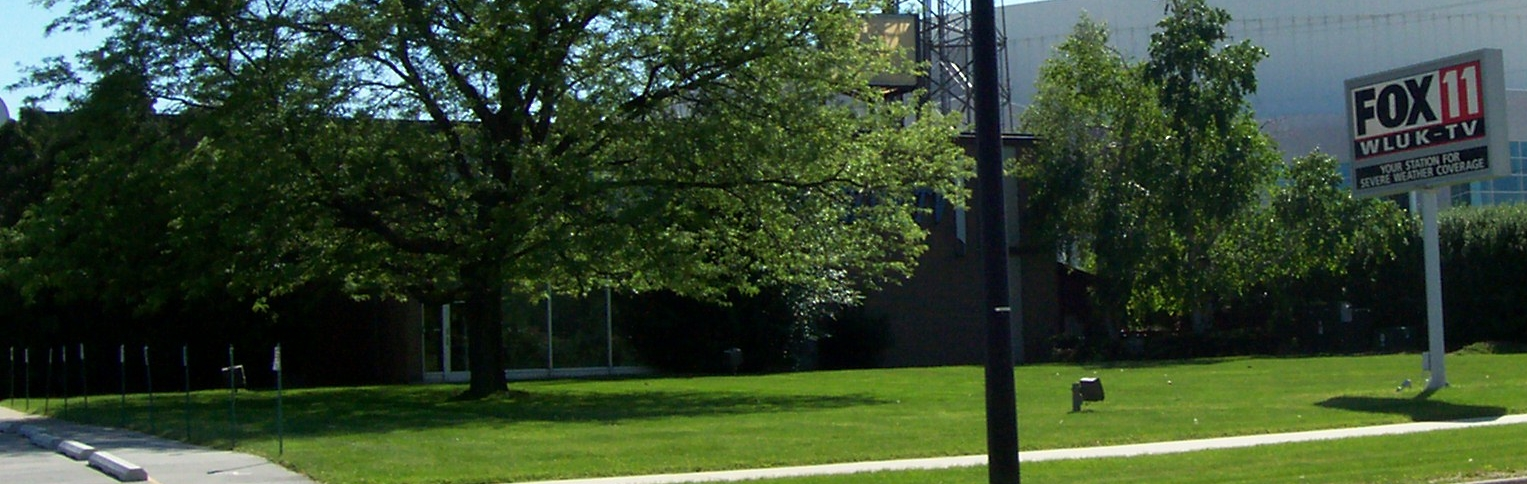
The WLUK-TV facility in 2007, before expansion.

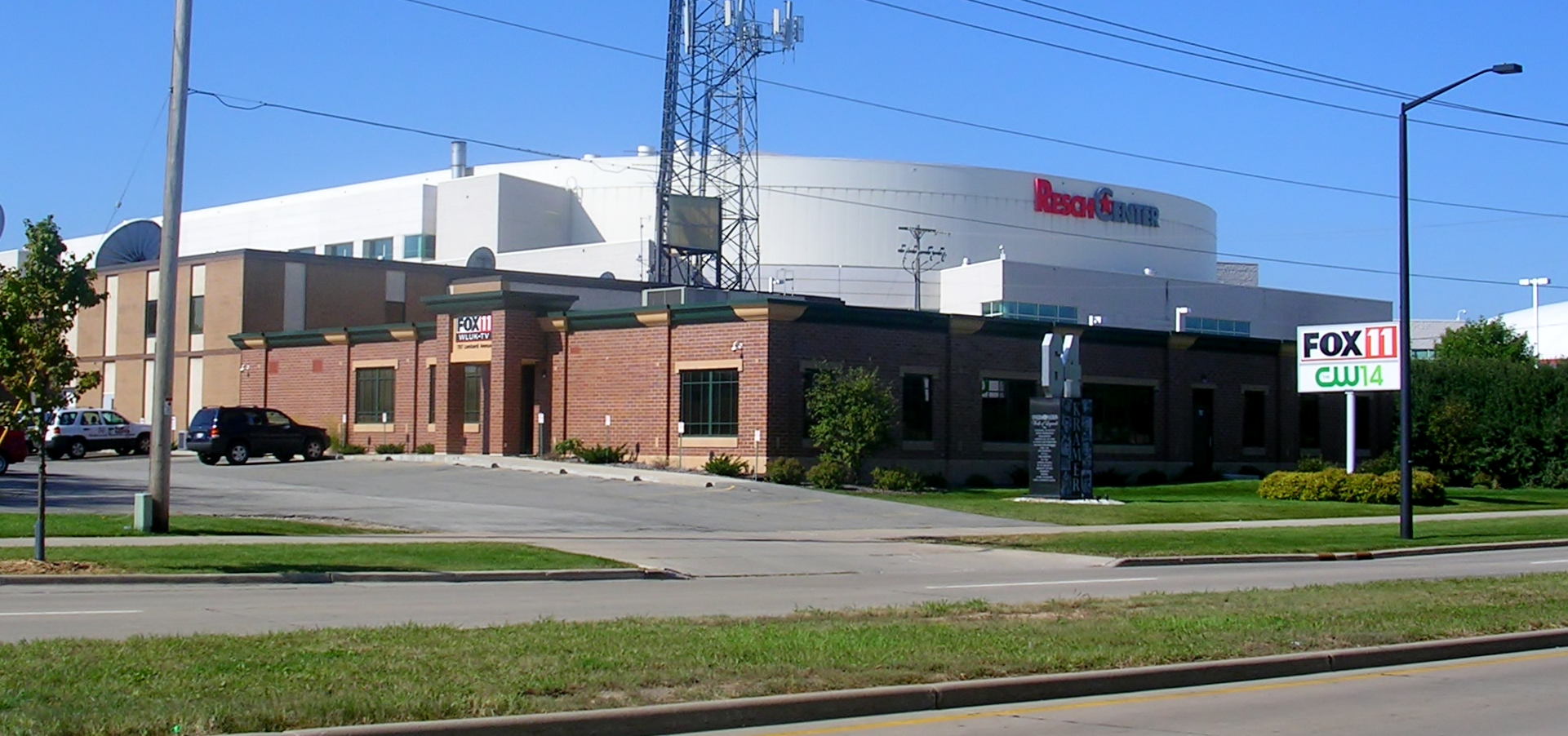
Present day image of WLUK's facility, with the building since expanded to accommodate a news and content center and signage altered to recognize its sister station, WCWF (a digital display monument-style sign has since replaced it). An "Oneida Nation Walk of Legends" monument to Packers player Jerry Kramer stands on the building's front lawn.

WLUK became a Fox affiliate on August 28, 1995, swapping affiliations with WGBA-TV (channel 26), which had acquired the Fox affiliation three years earlier after WXGZ-TV (channel 32, now WACY-TV) shut down due to financial issues. Like most former "Big Three" network affiliates that switched to Fox during that time, WLUK picked up almost no syndicated programming from WGBA, though it was unnecessary because of WGBA's local marketing agreement with WACY-TV; WGBA's programming largely moved to that station instead. The final NBC program to air on WLUK was a repeat of the NBC Sunday Night at the Movies feature Wayne's World at 8 p.m. on August 27, 1995.

Because of Fox's 1994 acquisition of television rights to the NFL's National Football Conference, the switch made WLUK the unofficial "home" station of the Green Bay Packers after years on WBAY-TV (and two years on WFRV), which became a major ratings draw (during the 1994 season, WGBA was the station of record for the Packers). Since channel 11 joined Fox, Packer football games have routinely drawn an 80% share of the viewing audience—far and away the highest-rated programs in the market. Unlike the New World Communications stations that converted to Fox affiliates, WLUK carried Fox Kids programming, running it one hour earlier on weekday afternoons from 1 to 4 p.m. The station ran Fox Kids until the weekday block ended in December 2001 (when it had been pushed back to as early as 10 a.m.), and its successor Saturday morning children's blocks known as Fox Box and later 4KidsTV until the latter block ended nationally in December 2008, when 4Kids Entertainment and Fox parted ways due to a contract dispute. By the time 4Kids TV ended its run, Fox permanently discontinued providing network-supplied children's programming, replacing it with the infomercial block Weekend Marketplace. Fox would return to children's programming in 2014 as Xploration Station replaced Weekend Marketplace.

On November 28, 1995, Silver King Communications (operated by former Fox executive Barry Diller) announced that it would acquire Savoy Pictures; at the time of the purchase, Silver King's existing stations had mainly been affiliates of the Home Shopping Network (both Silver King and HSN were later acquired by USA Networks). The sale of WVUE and the other SF stations was approved and finalized in March 1996, with its other assets being merged into the company that November. On April 1, 1997, Silver King sold the SF Broadcasting stations to Indianapolis-based Emmis Communications for $307 million in cash and stock, as part of a sale of Silver King/USA's major network affiliates in order to concentrate on its formerly HSN-affiliated independent stations.

==== LIN Media ownership ====
On May 15, 2005, Emmis Communications announced that it would sell its 16 television stations, including WLUK-TV, in order to concentrate on its radio station properties. On August 22, LIN TV Corporation purchased WLUK in a $260 million deal that included WALA-TV and sister station WBPG in Mobile; WTHI-TV in Terre Haute, Indiana, and KRQE-TV in Albuquerque, New Mexico; the sale closed on December 1, 2005.

On June 4, 2010, LIN TV entered into shared services and local sales agreements to operate CW affiliate WIWB (channel 14, now WCWF) as part of a deal involving LIN and ACME Communications-owned stations in markets where both companies owned stations. WLUK began to provide technical, engineering, promotional, administrative and other operational support services for WIWB, with advertising sales services under a related but separate joint sales agreement. That station moved its operations into WLUK's studios that August. LIN would purchase WCWF outright in April 2011, under a failing station waiver (an indication that the station was in an economically non-viable position, which permitted a duopoly even though Green Bay has only seven full-power stations, one fewer than that required by FCC rules to legally permit a duopoly between WLUK and WCWF if both were economically viable), creating the Green Bay market's first legal television station duopoly.

==== Sinclair Broadcast Group ownership ====
On March 21, 2014, LIN Media entered into an agreement to merge with Media General in a $1.6 billion deal. Because, at the time, Media General owned ABC affiliate WBAY-TV (which Media General acquired in 2013 as part of its merger with Young Broadcasting), and since WBAY and WLUK ranked among the four highest-rated stations in the Green Bay market in total day viewership, the companies were required to sell either WBAY or the WLUK/WCWF duopoly to another station owner in order to comply with FCC ownership rules. Media General announced on August 20, 2014, that it would keep WBAY, and sell WLUK and WCWF to the Sinclair Broadcast Group as part of a multi-market deal (Sinclair would also acquire WJAR in Providence and WTGS in Savannah, while Media General would acquire Sinclair's WTTA in Tampa, WHTM in Harrisburg–itself a divestiture as part of Sinclair's purchase of the Allbritton Communications stations–and KXRM-TV/KXTU-LD in Colorado Springs). WHTM's sale of Media General was explored nearly two months earlier, and it was completed, nearly three months before the Media General/LIN deal was completed.

Sinclair's acquisitions of WLUK and WCWF were completed on December 19, 2014, and expanded the company's presence in Wisconsin, as it already owned WMSN-TV in Madison and the Milwaukee duopoly of WVTV and WCGV-TV. The deal also placed WLUK back under common ownership with dual WLUC-TV in Marquette, which Sinclair acquired in 2013 (both WLUK and WLUC shared common ownership from 1963 to 1987 under Post and Gillett), though this reunion was a brief one, as on October 1, 2015, Sinclair struck a deal to sell WLUC to Gray Television in exchange for CBS affiliate WSBT-TV in South Bend, Indiana, as part of station divestitures that Gray instituted in order to receive regulatory approval of its acquisition of the television stations operated by the latter station's longtime owner, Schurz Communications. That deal closed on February 16, 2016, separating the two stations once again. WLUC then became a sister station to another Green Bay station, WBAY-TV in January 2017 as the result of another divestiture required by the FCC in the Nexstar/Media General merger which required the selling of WBAY-TV to Gray.

On July 6, 2016, Sinclair and WLUK announced they had placed the winning bid with ESPN for the local syndication of that cable network's Monday Night Football games with the Packers for multiple years; the agreement would have also included the 2016 preseason Pro Football Hall of Fame Game on August 7, a day after Brett Favre's induction into the Pro Football Hall of Fame (this was due to regular rights carrier NBC passing the game to ESPN due to the 2016 Summer Olympics; the game was canceled an hour before kickoff due to poor field conditions). With Fox's acquisition of Thursday Night Football rights through the 2021 season, this assured WLUK a minimum of ten Packers games per season, barring any NBC or CBS cross-flexing.

== Programming ==
From 1970 until 1972 when WPNE-TV (channel 38) launched, the NET/PBS show Sesame Street was broadcast on WLUK in the morning hours due to the lack of a public television station in the Green Bay area.

A longtime staple on WLUK's daily schedule was reruns of the NBC drama Little House on the Prairie; the station was one of the few in the nation to count Little House towards its fulfillment of educational and informational content obligations for young audiences, citing in part the series' inspiration from the Little House children's book series authored by state native Laura Ingalls Wilder. Little House was dropped from WLUK's daily schedule in September 2013, in part to make room for the new acquisition Live!. For that year, it purchased syndicated E/I programming on a barter basis for weekend airings to fulfill E/I requirements, which was reduced to an hour in mid-September 2014 as WLUK took the Fox-offered E/I block Xploration Station, which features two hours of compliant programming (as such, it was the first Fox affiliate owned-and/or-operated by Sinclair that carried the block, as the group's other Fox stations at the time carried E/I programs through existing contracts with syndicators of educational program content instead; the remainder of Sinclair's Fox-affiliated stations began carrying the Xploration Station block in September 2016).

Since becoming a Fox affiliate in 1995, WLUK has featured an extensive amount of local news coverage (see below). Local non-news programming includes Living with Amy, which debuted in September 2008 and currently airs in the 10 a.m. weekday time slot; hosted by former Good Day Wisconsin anchor Amy Hanten, Living features lifestyle, cooking, and paid business spotlight segments, with the cooking segments mainly sponsored by Kroger's Pick 'n Save and Copps stores (previously sponsored by Festival Foods), which has made a recipe compilation book featuring previous Living with Amy recipes available in-store.

During the Green Bay Packers season, WLUK airs an assortment of Packers-related programming, including Inside the Huddle, which offers previews, reviews, and analysis of Packer games on Sunday mornings and Monday evenings, as well as extended newscasts with training camp coverage. Also airing during the Packers season until 2022 was The Better Half; hosted by Rachel Manek and airing Friday mornings at 10 a.m., the show features interviews, discussions, and advice from wives and girlfriends of Packers players and coaches. Wheel of Fortune is moved back an hour on nights when WLUK carries Thursday Night Football from Fox or a Monday Night Football game plus college football/basketball games to lower schedule disruption.

=== News operation ===
WLUK-TV presently broadcasts 43 hours of local newscasts each week (with seven hours each weekday and four hours each on Saturdays and Sundays); in regards to the number of hours devoted to news programming, it is the highest local newscast output among the Green Bay market's broadcast television stations and the second-highest among Wisconsin's television stations (behind fellow Fox affiliate WITI in Milwaukee, which carries 56 hours each week).

In addition to its main facilities, the station operates a Valley Newsroom on West College Avenue in Appleton along US 41. The station has its own weather radar, known as "Fox 11 StormTrackerX", at its main studios on Lombardi Avenue. The station also maintains a tower camera on its Doppler tower known as the "Lambeau Cam" which is mainly pointed in the direction of Lambeau Field.

The station dropped its nightly newscast in 1967 and did not resume regular local news broadcasts until 1971. However, WLUK did occasionally run documentaries and sports programs to fulfill FCC public service regulations as well as a weekly commentary by Appleton Post-Crescent editor John Torinus. After gaining the Fox affiliation in August 1995, this station expanded its local news offerings: in its first year with the network, local news ran on weekdays from 6 to 8 a.m. (the morning newscast being extended by one hour and syndicated programming filling the 8 a.m. hour to fill timeslots vacated by the departure of Today), 5 to 6:30 p.m. (with a half-hour added at 5:30 p.m. to fill the timeslot vacated by the departure of NBC Nightly News), and 9 to 10:30 p.m. The 10 p.m. newscast was eventually dropped by the early 2000s and replaced with syndicated programming, with the 6 p.m. show ended in 2005 when the station acquired the Sony game show rights, while the morning newscast expanded over time to four hours; additional morning newscasts on Saturdays and Sundays were added later in the 2000s. WLUK returned to airing a 10 p.m. newscast on September 21, 2015.

In 2007 (during Fox's coverage of the Major League Baseball League Championship Series), WLUK's 9 p.m. newscast began to air over a leased access channel on Time Warner Cable on nights in which Fox broadcasts sports programming or movies during the prime time hours that run into the 9 p.m. timeslot on channel 11; WCWF took over carriage of the preempted/delayed 9 p.m. newscasts in October 2010, as a result of the SSA between WCWF and WLUK. On June 5, 2007, WLUK replaced WGBA-TV as the provider of weather updates for the 11-station Midwest Communications radio cluster in Green Bay/Fox Cities and Sheboygan. In 2009, a new addition to the Lombardi Avenue studios was completed to expand the station's newsroom space, and is known as the "Fox 11 Digital Content Center".

Channel 11 was also the first local television station in the market to have full featured iOS and Android Market applications (for mobile phones and tablets). In March 2012, the station's newscasts were moved into the Content Center as the station prepared its studio and facilities for high definition broadcasting, and began construction of an HD-optimized news set. Beginning with the 5 p.m. newscast on April 23, 2012, WLUK became the third station in the Green Bay-Appleton market to begin broadcasting its local news programming in high definition. The station uses the AFD #10 flag to present its newscasts in letterboxed widescreen for viewers watching on cable television through traditional 4:3 sets.

==== Notable former on-air staff ====
- Ross Becker-Buchberger – reporter (1974–1975)
- Jay Johnson – anchor (1982–1987)
- Josh Moser – sports anchor and journalist
- Kyra Phillips
- Bill Weir

== Technical information ==
=== Subchannels ===
The station's signal is multiplexed:

Subchannels of WLUK-TV
Subchannel	Res.	Short name	Programming
11.1	720p	WLUKFOX	Fox
11.2	480i	Antenna	Antenna TV
11.3	480i	ROAR	Roar
14.1	1080i	WCWF-CW	The CW (WCWF)

Broadcast on behalf of another station

As part of a group affiliation deal between Sinclair Broadcast Group and Tribune Media, WLUK launched Antenna TV, a digital subchannel on virtual channel 11.2, on January 1, 2016, as an affiliate with the Tribune-owned classic television network. On February 13, 2017, WLUK-TV added TBD, a new channel mainly featuring web videos targeting millennials to 11.3. WLUK's news and local content (outside sportscasts) is also available through Stirr, Sinclair's over-the-top streaming service.

=== Analog-to-digital conversion ===
WLUK-TV shut down its analog signal, over VHF channel 11, on June 12, 2009, the official date on which full-power television stations in the United States transitioned from analog to digital broadcasts under federal mandate. The station's digital signal relocated from its pre-transition UHF channel 51 to VHF channel 11. On August 17, 2011, the station increased its transmitter power from 17.19 kW to 40 kW. Prior to this, Madison Fox affiliate WMSN-TV (a fellow Sinclair station pre-dating their ownership of WLUK) had broadcast its digital signal on channel 11, WLUK had to decrease its transmitter power to prevent interference with that station; when WMSN moved their digital channel to the UHF band to address reception issues in the Madison area, WLUK applied to the FCC to increase power once again.

As part of the FCC's spectrum repack, the station shifted from physical channel 11 to 12 on July 3, 2020, but continued to utilize virtual channel 11. Sinclair then moved the station to UHF physical channel 18 (still virtual channel 11) on September 1, 2022, in order to address oncoming concerns about the ATSC 3.0 rollout, along with improving WLUK's signal in general. The shift made Green Bay a 'UHF island' for both current iterations of ATSC. WCWF hosts WLUK's main channel in ATSC 3.0 on its bandwidth (remaining in 720p), and its own main ATSC 1.0 signal is transmitted using WLUK's bandwidth as a channel share.

== Out-of-market carriage ==
In the Upper Peninsula of Michigan, WLUK is only available over-the-air in Menominee County. A low-power digital translator, W40AN-D (channel 40) in Escanaba, operated until July 11, 2018. Despite this, WLUK was formerly carried by Charter Communications in the West and Central Upper Peninsula, along with WLUC-DT2 except in Gogebic County which is covered by the signal of Duluth, Minnesota's Fox affiliate KQDS-TV and the Eastern Upper Peninsula which is covered by WWUP-DT 10.2 (a high definition digital simulcast of Cadillac, Michigan's WFQX-TV). WLUK can also be seen on Charter in Ludington, Michigan, across Lake Michigan from the Green Bay area.

== Retransmission controversies ==
Until April 2008, WLUK's high definition signal was only available over the air as the station had maintained edicts going back to its ownership under Emmis not to allow local cable or satellite providers to carry its digital signal without paid retransmission consent. LIN TV continued to apply this policy after its purchase of the Emmis stations and eventually extended it further to the remainder of its existing stations. Station officials kept their stance against local pay television providers, defending it on WLUK's website and in on-air promotions. The first provider to carry WLUK-DT was Dish Network as part of a March 13, 2008, carriage agreement with LIN TV. Originally, the signal was to be added in May 2008, but Dish began offering HD feeds of the Green Bay stations early on April 16, surprised viewers with WLUK carried on channel 5163. DirecTV followed on June 8.

With retransmission agreements firmed up with the satellite providers, LIN TV began to pursue the market's major cable providers for new deals. Charter was the first to be affected with its carriage agreement with WLUK expiring on July 1. By June 11, Charter and LIN reached a new agreement under undisclosed terms and WLUK-DT began to be carried on digital channel 611 shortly thereafter; AT&T U-verse struck an agreement to carry the digital signal on June 30, 2008, while Comcast's Manitowoc system offered compensation to carry WLUK-DT on June 12 on digital channel 234. This left Time Warner Cable as the lone holdout in the area to carry the HD feed as the provider and LIN TV had not come to an agreement nationally.

With no success from either viewer pressure or contentious negotiations, the system was forced to pull WLUK from its systems on October 3, 2008. Time Warner quickly offered free antennas for customers to receive the station. WLUK encouraged viewers to switch to Dish Network and U-verse in order to continue to watch the station in some form. In the month that followed, the ratings of LIN TV stations affected by the Time Warner dispute plunged, while viewers complained about the loss of Green Bay Packers and MLB Playoff games on WLUK.

By the time of the 2008 World Series, Time Warner Cable made an odd but creative move to allow its viewers to watch the games by offering Fox Sports en Español on basic cable, which carried the Series in Spanish while encouraging viewers to turn down the Spanish play-by-play audio and listen to the game in English on ESPN Radio affiliate WDUZ. Eventually the two companies came to a new carriage agreement on October 29, and WLUK's analog signal was restored on the same day with WLUK-DT being added on digital channel 712 (currently 1012) shortly thereafter, giving the station's digital signal full cable and satellite carriage on par with the other "Big Three" network affiliates.

On March 5, 2011, WLUK was removed from Dish Network as LIN and Dish could not come to terms on a new carriage agreement, and was restored when a new agreement was reached on March 12. WCWF remained unaffected as LIN's purchase of that station had not yet been finalized and was under the terms of their pre-WLUK SSA carriage agreement negotiated with ACME Communications.

=== Removal from out-of-market cable providers ===
On September 4, 2012, WLUK's signal was removed by Charter Communications systems in the Upper Peninsula and Marquette, and from systems in Sheboygan County, Lomira (both with WITI in-market) and Montello (part of the Madison market served by WMSN-TV) on September 27, 2012. This was due not to either the station or LIN removing access to the station, but contractual agreements by the Fox network itself which disallow signal duplication of network programming by an out-of-market signal despite the station's longtime service to each area, a source of controversy already in other duplicative market areas in the past. The 'one station per system' rule ended up becoming contractually standard across the cable and broadcast television industries by the end of the decade. WLUK continues to present the forecasts on Midwest Communications' Sheboygan radio stations despite the loss of coverage on that city's cable provider. Despite the loss of cable carriage in the Upper Peninsula, it was still available to antenna viewers in Escanaba via W40AN-D until July 2018.
