= WACY-TV =

Television station in Appleton, Wisconsin

- Appleton–Green Bay, Wisconsin; United States
- City: Appleton, Wisconsin
- Channels: Digital: 36 (UHF); Virtual: 32
- Branding: The Spot – Green Bay 32

Programming
- Affiliations: 32.1: Independent / NBC (alternate); for others, see § Subchannels

Ownership
- Owner: E. W. Scripps Company; (Scripps Broadcasting Holdings LLC)
- Sister stations: WGBA-TV

History
- Founded: April 25, 1983
- First air date: March 7, 1984
- Former call signs: WXGZ-TV (1984–1995); WACY (1995–2009)
- Former channel numbers: Analog: 32 (UHF, 1984–2009); Digital: 59 (UHF, 2002–2006), 27 (UHF, 2006–2019)
- Former affiliations: Independent (1984–1986, 1994–1995); Fox (1986–1992); Dark (1992–1994); UPN (1995–2006); The WB (Secondary 1995–1999); MyNetworkTV (2006–2022)
- Call sign meaning: Station was owned by Ace TV in the 1990s

Technical information
- Licensing authority: FCC
- Facility ID: 361
- ERP: 85 kW
- HAAT: 297.3 m (975 ft)
- Transmitter coordinates: 44°21′30″N 87°58′48.4″W

Links
- Public license information: Public file; LMS
- Website: www.nbc26.com/thespot-greenbay32

WACY-TV (channel 32), branded as The Spot – Green Bay 32, is an independent television station licensed to Appleton, Wisconsin, United States, serving the Green Bay area. It is owned by the E. W. Scripps Company alongside NBC affiliate WGBA-TV (channel 26). The two stations share studios on North Road near Airport Drive/WIS 172 in the Green Bay suburb of Ashwaubenon; WACY-TV's transmitter is located in the Shirley section of Glenmore, Wisconsin.

== History ==
=== Early history and troubles ===
The station first signed on the air on March 7, 1984, as WXGZ-TV, and was the first television station licensed to and based out of Appleton; it was originally owned by Appleton Midwestern Television. The station's original studio was located on North Marshall Road, southwest of the Interstate 41/WIS 441 interchange on Appleton's north side. The Post-Crescent reported on January 31 that the station began operations by testing its signal, although it formally began programming on March 7. WXGZ originally operated as an independent station during its first three years, showing off-network sitcoms and other syndicated programming. On October 6, 1986, under the "Super 32" moniker, WXGZ became a charter affiliate of the Fox network. However, like most early Fox affiliates, the station continued to essentially program itself as an independent station. The network's only program at the time was the late night talk program The Late Show Starring Joan Rivers; prime time programming followed in 1987. After joining Fox, WXGZ became the first station in the Green Bay–Appleton television market to begin broadcasting in stereo.

A noted local personality on WXGZ was "Oscor the Clown" (played by Wayne Lowney), who served as the mascot of the WXGZ children's lineup and hosted a Sunday morning program starting in 1986 called Oscor's Place, a show whose major sponsor was Chuck E. Cheese's predecessor brand, ShowBiz Pizza Place. Outside of Fox programming, WXGZ was noteworthy for airing the successful first-run syndicated programs Star Trek: The Next Generation and The Arsenio Hall Show.

By November 1991, Appleton Midwestern Television ran into financial problems and declared bankruptcy. After an unsuccessful search for a new buyer for the station or more financing, WXGZ was forced to sign-off permanently on the night of February 14, 1992, ending its eight-year history with a half-hour retrospective featuring on-air and behind-the-scenes footage at the station. WXGZ staff announcer Ed Myers and general manager Roy Smith said the last of the station's goodbyes, after which WXGZ closed operations at midnight. The next morning, fellow independent station WGBA-TV (channel 26) became the market's new Fox affiliate, and acquired some of WXGZ's syndicated programming inventory (including Arsenio and Star Trek: The Next Generation).

After WXGZ's shut down, the station's license was left in the hands of a holding company from March to August 1992, at which point it was bought by Ace TV Incorporated, a corporation solely owned by Shirley A. Martin. Channel 32 remained off-the-air for two years with occasional word that the station intended to begin broadcasting again "in the near future".

=== Revival as WACY-TV ===
WXGZ's license to operate was put back into use in June 1994. License holder Ace TV put WXGZ back on the air with the help of WGBA and its then-owner Aries Telecommunications, who arranged to put WXGZ on solid financial footing through the entrance of a local marketing agreement with Ace TV, allowing WGBA to operate and program WXGZ through its studios and sell advertising time for the station.

At the outset, programming on WXGZ (whose logo was an ace of spades as a nod to its owner) consisted of second-run airings of off-network reruns (including such series as Gunsmoke, St. Elsewhere and Newhart), along with select airings of Milwaukee Brewers baseball and Milwaukee Bucks basketball games (which WGBA previously aired but no longer had room to run due to its own commitments with Fox). By the fall of 1994, first-run syndicated programming would be included on WXGZ's schedule, including Family Feud and programming from the Prime Time Entertainment Network syndication service. On January 16, 1995, WXGZ became a charter affiliate of the United Paramount Network (UPN). The station also maintained a secondary affiliation with The WB for the network's first four years before WIWB (channel 14, now WCWF) became the Green Bay market's WB affiliate in June 1999.

By August 1995, the station – which would change its call sign that month to WACY-TV – benefited from WGBA's affiliation switch to NBC (due to WLUK-TV, channel 11, joining Fox). With WGBA now committed to NBC and its programming lineup, programs that WGBA no longer had room to broadcast were moved over to WACY, including some syndicated programming (most notably reruns of The Simpsons) and daytime children's programming. With this move, WACY adopted the "WACkY 32" branding for its kids' lineup (running roughly 6–11 a.m. and 1–5 p.m.), which over the years would include Garfield and Friends, Scooby-Doo, Dennis the Menace, Pokémon, Sailor Moon and Adventures of Sonic the Hedgehog; programs from the UPN Kids, BKN and The Disney Afternoon blocks (as well as from Kids' WB as the Green Bay television market did not have a full-time WB affiliate); and educational and informational-compliant programs like The New Zoo Revue. The live character "Cuddles the Clown" provided host continuity for "WACkY 32" programming. The station's children's lineup would dwindle over the years, thanks in part to increased cable competition from cable channels such as Cartoon Network and Nickelodeon and the decreased financial justification of airing a more-than-necessary amount of children's programming, although it would continue to air UPN's Disney's One Too until the network discontinued its daily children's block in 2003. After that, WACY would rely on general syndicated entertainment and infomercials for its daytime lineup.

One of WACY's most durable programs was called Who, What, When, Where, a show hosted by Oshkosh public-access television personalities Jim C. Hoffman and Dan Davies. Who, What, When, Where featured various interviews, advertisements (notably Ron and Lloyd's supermarket and WNAM radio), and entertainment sketches performed by Davies. The show would be rechristened N.E.W. Now (for "North East Wisconsin") in early 1997, its last year on the air. Later local shows on WACY included the legal affairs show It's the Law, produced by Hoffman and hosted by Oshkosh attorney George W. Curtis, and the Sunday morning polka music show Polka, Polka, Polka, which originated from a Manitowoc supper club/dance hall (Polka, Polka, Polka now airs on WCWF).

In 2004, Milwaukee-based Journal Communications (owner of that city's WTMJ-TV), purchased WGBA from Aries Telecommunications for $43.25 million. As part of the deal, Journal would take over the local marketing agreement with WACY, as well as acquire the option to purchase channel 32 from Ace TV if the Federal Communications Commission (FCC) ever relaxed or waived its media ownership rules to allow the purchase.

=== MyNetworkTV affiliation (2006–2022) ===
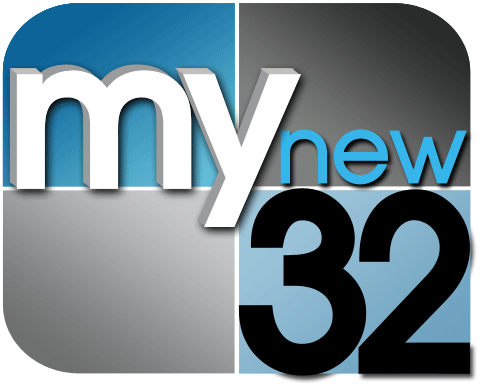
The station's "My New 32" logo used from 2006 until 2021

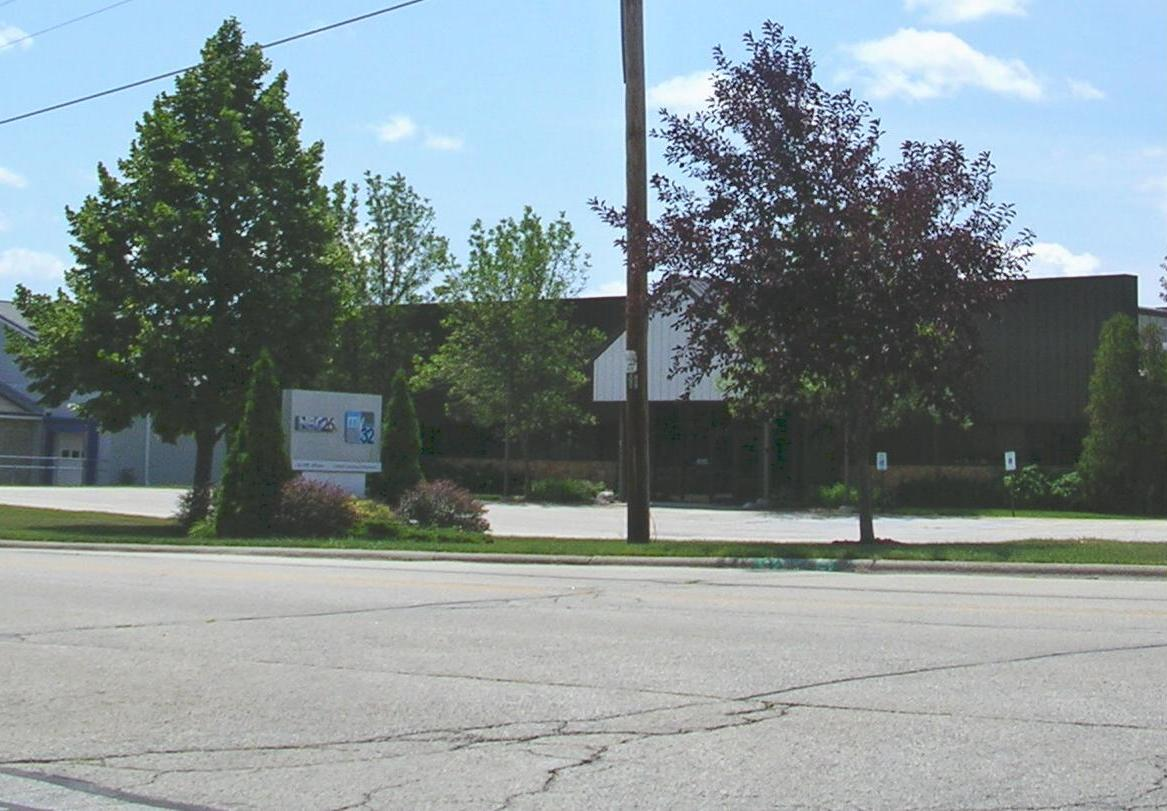
The studios of WACY-TV and WGBA-TV in 2007

On February 22, 2006, News Corporation announced the launch of a new "sixth" network called MyNetworkTV, which would be operated by Fox Television Stations and its syndication division Twentieth Television. MyNetworkTV was created to compete against another upstart network that would launch at the same time that September, The CW (an amalgamated network that was originally consisted primarily of UPN and The WB's higher-rated programs) as well as to give UPN and WB stations that were not mentioned as becoming CW affiliates another option besides converting to independent stations. WACY reached a turning point with the pending loss of UPN programming, as a result of the shutdown of the network and The CW's launch. The CW chose WIWB as its Green Bay affiliate, as that station's then-owner ACME Communications had a deep relationship with WB management (ACME's founder Jamie Kellner was a former president of The WB). On March 22, 2006, WACY announced that it would affiliate with MyNetworkTV, bringing channel 32's affiliation with a Fox-owned network full-circle.

After the 2005–06 television season ended, WACY began distancing itself from UPN, reducing its carriage of the network's programming on Monday through Thursdays to only one hour per night during the summer of 2006, with infomercials filling the dropped second hour. WACY severed ties with UPN completely on September 4 (the night prior to MyNetworkTV's debut), leaving WIWB to air the balance of UPN programming as a transitional secondary affiliation alongside its WB shows (including weekend airings of Veronica Mars and WWE Friday Night SmackDown).

After affiliating with MyNetworkTV, WACY adopted a new branding in late-July 2006, becoming "My New 32"—with "New" referring to both the "new" network, and as an abbreviation of "Northeast Wisconsin"—and in the process downplaying the WACY call sign (aside from official station identification) and abandoning the ace of spades logo that the station used in some form since its return to the air in 1994.

As far back as the latter years of WACY's UPN affiliation, the station aired a weekly high school football game featuring local schools on Friday nights in the fall (billed as Friday Night Thunder), with select University of Wisconsin–Green Bay men's and women's basketball games added in 2007. All sports broadcasts on WACY featured WGBA's sports anchors, while visual presentation depended on the in-house camera system from the arena where the game was played instead of station-owned cameras. The broadcasts of high school games were discontinued in 2008, in part due to the addition of SmackDown to MyNetworkTV's Friday night lineup and also due to a lean financial period for the stations during the Great Recession, at a time when WGBA's news and sports staff were cut back due to budget concerns, WTMJ began to take control of several of WGBA's newscasts, and infomercials occupied portions of WACY's programming schedule. Sports broadcasts would return to WACY in August 2011 under the N.E.W. Sports Showdown banner, featuring both high school sports as well as St. Norbert College athletics (added in 2011) and Wisconsin Timber Rattlers baseball (added in the spring of 2013 until 2017, returned/revived in 2024).

A late-night feature that aired on WACY's weekend lineup was the movie program Ned the Dead. Hosted by the ghoulish "Ned" (played by local actor and radio personality Steve Brenzel), the show – which began on WLUK-TV in the 1980s as Ned the Dead's Chiller Theater before eventually moving to WACY – featured presentations of B-movies (mainly sci-fi or horror features from the 1950s), with "Ned" providing wraparound segments of comic relief. Over the years, Ned would move toward airings of low-budget color films and additional segments of Ned and his colorful troupe of sidekicks. Though Ned the Dead would move around WACY's schedule during its time on the station, the show aired mainly at 11 p.m. on Saturdays and was sponsored by the Van Vredee's chain of local furniture/appliance stores (Brenzel serves as the stores' spokesperson). Ned the Dead ended its WACY run on December 12, 2010.

==== 2012 full purchase of station by Journal ====
In May 2012, Journal Communications commenced on a plan to purchase WACY from Ace TV, Inc. for $4.65 million. Although Journal obtained the option to purchase WACY when it bought WGBA in the mid-2000s, it could not proceed with a purchase of WACY due to FCC duopoly limits placed on markets such as Green Bay–Appleton, which has fewer than eight independently owned full-power television stations. In paperwork filed with the FCC on May 3, 2012, Journal included a "failing station waiver" that would allow it to purchase WACY and keep it on the air, an avenue that LIN TV Corporation used in purchasing Green Bay's WCWF in 2011 and creating a duopoly with WLUK-TV. As the petitioner, Journal needed to prove in its waiver request that WACY was in an economically non-viable position (reasoning that LIN also cited in its purchase of WCWF).

The FCC would approve Journal's request of WACY's license transfer on September 4, 2012, specifically citing two points Journal had included in its request: The financial and operational status of WACY before the grandfathered LMA commenced in 1994 (and which Journal inherited when it bought WGBA in 2004), and WGBA's ability to "produce and broadcast [on WACY] programming that furthers the public interest," programming that WACY would otherwise not have been able to produce. Also cited was channel 32's bankruptcy as WXGZ. On October 23, the deal was consummated. It was the third station that Journal acquired through a failed station waiver, after KNIN-TV in Boise and KWBA in Tucson.

=== Summer 2013 Time Warner Cable carriage dispute ===
After several extensions of the original June 30, 2013, expired agreement, and the invocation of the sweeps rule disallowing cable providers from pulling the main signal of a carried station during local sweeps periods (which includes July), the main signals of WGBA and WACY were pulled off Time Warner Cable systems in the market at midnight on July 25, 2013. The MeTV subchannel had been pulled earlier on July 10 as those were not under the same protection under the sweeps rule. WTMJ was also affected in the Milwaukee market, along with Journal stations in Omaha and Palm Springs, California. The main effect of the blackout on Time Warner Cable systems was the carriage of three Packers preseason games on WTMJ and WGBA, which were blacked out on the provider due to the dispute, though the games were still available via the Spanish language simulcast using the Packers Television network camera positions produced for Milwaukee's Telemundo affiliate WYTU-LD (channel 63/49.4), which is carried on the subchannel tier in the Green Bay market (and was simulcast on WACY), with the suggestion to listen to English play-by-play via either WTMJ radio from Milwaukee or the local FM stations in Green Bay or Appleton carrying Packers Radio Network coverage. The later replays of the games were also available via replays on NFL Network through the week.

A class action lawsuit was also filed by viewers against Time Warner Cable on August 8 under grounds of breach of contract. Journal Broadcast Group has also made claims via its website detailing their version of the carriage dispute that TWC was distracted due to the other dispute involving CBS Corporation's Television Stations group and Showtime Networks premium channel suites.

By August 15, WGBA and WACY's channel slots on Time Warner Cable were replaced with a simulcast of GSN, with Starz Kids & Family airing on the channel 994 subchannel slot usually carrying MeTV. Journal Broadcast Group also asked state authorities to intervene in their dispute with Time Warner Cable.

Journal and Time Warner Cable came to an agreement for carriage on September 20, 2013, to last at least through the 2016 Summer Olympics, returning WGBA and WACY to their lineups as of 7 p.m. that evening. However, Journal conceded that the analog and cable-ready positions were less important than carriage in the high definition tier, so while WGBA's high definition signal remained on channel 1007, the standard definition signal moved to channel 13, WACY's former SD slot, with WACY shifting to channel 83 with high definition coverage coming at the start of the year. However, MeTV subchannel 26.2 remained removed from Time Warner systems, though southern portions of the Green Bay market already receive MeTV Milwaukee flagship WBME-CD (channel 41) on the basic lifeline tier.

=== Sale to the E. W. Scripps Company ===
On July 30, 2014, the E. W. Scripps Company announced that it would acquire Journal Communications in an all-stock transaction. The combined firm would retain their broadcast properties, including WTMJ-TV and its radio siblings, with the print assets being spun off as Journal Media Group. The deal was approved by the FCC on December 12, 2014, with shareholders of the two companies approving it on March 11, 2015; the merger/spin-off between Journal and Scripps formally closed on April 1.

E. W. Scripps and Time Warner Cable announced a new multi-year carriage agreement on February 1, 2016, that includes WGBA and WACY, along with WACY's new subchannels also coming to Time Warner in addition to those of WGBA.

In October 2021, WACY-TV began to discontinue the "MyNew32" branding (and its secondary "My32" branding used since 2016) in favor of the on-air "TV 32" branding, downplaying their affiliation with MyNetworkTV.

=== Return to independence (2022–present) ===
On June 3, 2022, WACY ended their affiliation with MyNetworkTV with no public notice, and returned to being an unaffiliated independent station for the first time since January 1995. The station replaced MyNetworkTV programming with Dateline and Chicago P.D. (both of which are also carried with MyNetworkTV). The schedule of the service quietly returned to the market in February 2023, when WBAY-TV picked it up as a late night offering on their third subchannel carrying Circle (currently 365BLK); the move of MyNetworkTV to a late night slot on a subchannel has become an increasingly common fate for the service.

In November 2025, to align the station's branding with that of Scripps' other independent stations, TV 32 was rebranded as "The Spot – Green Bay 32".

== Local programming ==
Locally-produced programming includes the cooking show Mad Dog & Merril's Midwest Grillin (Mad Dog and Merril are longtime Northeast Wisconsin-based cooking experts). The station also airs local high school and college sports, under the umbrella title of N.E.W. Sports Showdown. The same title is also used for a broad schedule of professional minor league sports carried by the station, including the United States Hockey League's Green Bay Gamblers. Beginning with the 2017–18 season, the station also broadcasts NBA G League games involving the Oshkosh-based Wisconsin Herd, which is owned by the Milwaukee Bucks and affiliates with that team.

Until 2016 when WCWF acquired local rights to the Wisconsin Interscholastic Athletic Association state basketball and hockey championships, it carried those tournaments for the Green Bay market. Unique for an English-language station, it also simulcasts Spanish-language coverage of preseason Green Bay Packers football produced by Milwaukee Telemundo affiliate WYTU-LD for the convenience of over-the-air viewers; both WACY and WYTU-LD have availability on local cable systems. When WGBA has NBC network commitments to the Summer Olympics, English-language coverage airs, along with the team's Family Night scrimmage.

On June 15, 2020, WACY debuted a half-hour weeknight 9 p.m. newscast produced by WGBA, titled My News at 9 with a repeat of NBC 26 Tonight (originally aired at 6:30 p.m. on WGBA) at 9:30 p.m. before its later cancellation; it now airs as of July 2024 as NBC 26 News at 9 on TV 32.

Since 2024, WACY has an agreement with the University of Wisconsin–Green Bay to air and produce select home men's and women's basketball games, which are aired beyond Green Bay and the visiting school's broadcast partner on ESPN+ under their general rights agreement with the Horizon League.

Since 2024, WACY shares the local rights to the Wisconsin Timber Rattlers, the High-A affiliate of the Milwaukee Brewers, with WCWF. In 2025, WACY reached an agreement with the Brewers to simulcast 13 games with FanDuel Sports Network Wisconsin. During the 2025 season, select Timber Rattlers games will air in tape delay after Brewers games.

== Technical information ==
=== Subchannels ===
The station's signal is multiplexed:

Subchannels of WACY-TV
Subchannel	Res.	Short name	Programming
32.1	720p	WACY	Independent
32.2	480i	LAFF	Laff
32.3	480i	Mystery	Ion Mystery
32.4	480i	CourtTV	Court TV
32.5	480i	Busted	Busted
32.6	480i	GameSho	Game Show Central
14.4	480i	Nest	The Nest (WCWF)
14.5	480i	QUEST	Quest (WCWF)

Broadcast on behalf of another station

=== Analog-to-digital conversion ===
WACY-TV shut down its analog signal, over UHF channel 32, on June 12, 2009, the official date on which full-power television stations in the United States transitioned from analog to digital broadcasts under federal mandate. The station's digital signal remained on its pre-transition UHF channel 27, using virtual channel 32.

One week after the transition, Journal chose to suffix all of their owned television stations with the "-TV" suffix as part of the FCC's one-time allowance during the transition to allow stations to suffix either "-TV" or "-DT" to their call signs if not previously included on their permanent digital channel; this included WACY despite its separate ownership by ACE TV at the time, which became WACY-TV in FCC correspondence and on-air station identifications on June 17, 2009.
