= WBAY-TV =

Television station in Green Bay, Wisconsin

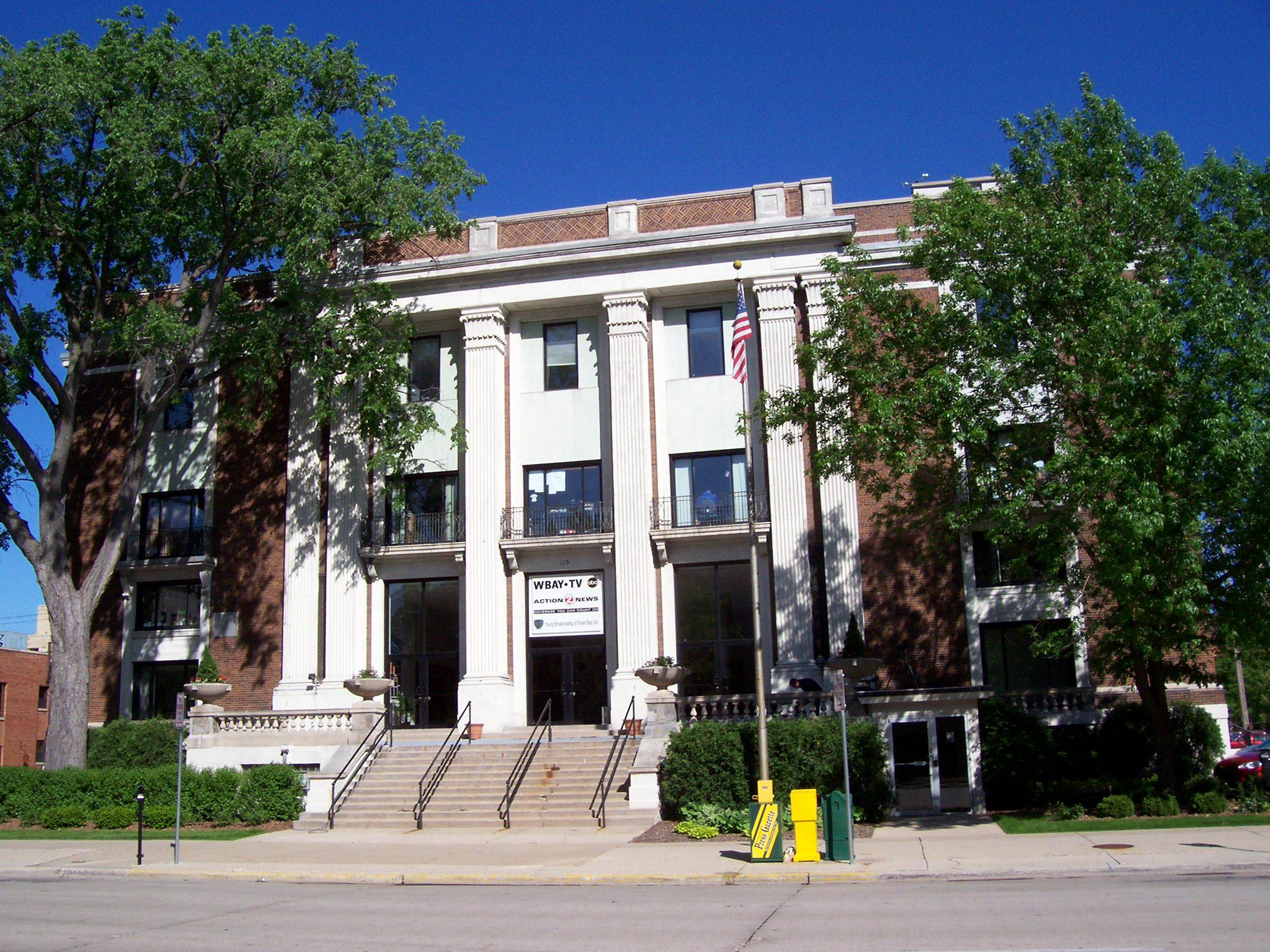
- Studios in 2007.
- Green Bay, Wisconsin; United States
- Channels: Digital: 23 (UHF); Virtual: 2
- Branding: WBAY-TV 2; ABC 2; Action 2 News

Programming
- Affiliations: 2.1: ABC; for others, see § Subchannels

Ownership
- Owner: Gray Media; (Gray Television Licensee, LLC)

History
- First air date: March 17, 1953
- Former channel number: Analog: 2 (VHF, 1953–2009)
- Former affiliations: CBS (1953–1992); ABC (secondary, 1953–January 1954); NBC (secondary, 1953–September 1954); DuMont (secondary, 1953–1956); NTA (secondary, 1956–1961); United (secondary, 1967)
- Call sign meaning: Green Bay (callsign taken from former sister radio station WBAY (AM), now WTAQ)

Technical information
- Licensing authority: FCC
- Facility ID: 74417
- ERP: 1,000 kW
- HAAT: 372 m (1,220 ft)
- Transmitter coordinates: 44°24′34.6″N 88°0′6.7″W

Links
- Public license information: Public file; LMS
- Website: www.wbay.com

WBAY-TV (channel 2) is a television station in Green Bay, Wisconsin, United States, affiliated with ABC and owned by Gray Media. The station's studios are located on South Jefferson Street in downtown Green Bay (across from the historic Brown County Courthouse), with a Fox Cities news bureau on College Avenue on the west side of Appleton, just south of Fox River Mall; its transmitter is located in Ledgeview, Wisconsin.

== History ==
=== As a CBS affiliate (1953–1992) ===
The only television station broadcasting in Wisconsin prior to the FCC's 1948 freeze on television licenses was WTMJ-TV in Milwaukee. After the FCC's freeze ended in 1952, WBAY-TV became the second television station on the air in the state, on March 17, 1953. WBAY-TV was originally owned by the Norbertine Order of Priests, whose abbey is in nearby De Pere. The priests run St. Norbert College in De Pere, and already operated WBAY radio (1360 AM, now WTAQ) in Green Bay and WHBY radio in Appleton. Like WTMJ when that station started in 1947 – as the only station in the market – WBAY originally carried programming from all four networks of the day – channel 2 was a primary CBS affiliate with secondary affiliations with NBC, ABC and DuMont.

ABC moved to WNAM-TV (channel 42, now WFRV-TV on channel 5) in Neenah when it started up in January 1954. Then, NBC moved to Marinette's WMBV-TV (channel 11, now Fox affiliate WLUK-TV) when it signed on in September of that year. With the shutdown of DuMont in August 1956, WBAY was left as an exclusive CBS affiliate. The station upgraded its transmitter and began broadcasting network programming in color in the fall of 1956. WBAY-TV would remain the only station licensed to Green Bay proper until the 1959 relocation of WLUK to the city. Locally produced programs were broadcast in color starting in 1966.

The station's studios in downtown Green Bay were built in 1924 as a former Knights of Columbus clubhouse and later was turned into a private Roman Catholic high school during the Great Depression when the Norbertines took over the building. The former gymnasium/auditorium is now called the WBAY Auditorium and is used as the studio for the station's cerebral palsy telethon. During the early years of WBAY, it served as the main studio until 1954 when an addition was built behind the main building. The auditorium has also been used for local theatrical productions. The station's newsroom is in the basement of the building in an area that originally held a swimming pool and bowling alley. The WBAY building also served as the home of the WBAY radio stations (now WTAQ and WIXX), which were later purchased by Midwest Communications in the late 1970s, but remained in the building until Midwest built a combined Green Bay operations facility/company headquarters in 2007 and a news-weather sharing agreement was maintained between WBAY-TV and its former radio sisters for many years before it was discontinued in favor of an agreement with WLUK-TV.

As a CBS affiliate, WBAY-TV benefited from that network's coverage of National Football League games, primarily those of the Green Bay Packers. The station carried its first Packers game a few months after signing on, and continued to air most Packers games until 1991 by virtue of CBS holding the rights to the Packers' conference, the National Football Conference (for the 1992 and 1993 seasons, Packers games moved to WFRV when that station switched to CBS). Packers games drew up to a 90 percent share of the audience during the team's championship era of the 1960s under Vince Lombardi (including the team's first two Super Bowl triumphs in Super Bowl I and Super Bowl II, the former of which was also carried by then-NBC affiliate WFRV), and the station carried the team's coaches' show The Vince Lombardi Show. The station also originated the team's exhibition game coverage from the 1960s to 2002, with some exceptions. Main anchor Bill Jartz has been Lambeau Field's PA system announcer since the start of the 2005–2006 season. Jartz retired from the station in May 2025, but continues to serve his role as PA announcer with the Packers. The station continued to air Monday Night Football Packer games originating from ESPN beginning with the move of MNF to cable starting with the 2006 until the 2015 season. For the 2016 season, WLUK-TV, the Packers' primary home by virtue of Fox presently holding the rights to the NFC, acquired the syndication rights to the ESPN games under a multi-year agreement. It was the first time that WBAY did not broadcast a Packers game during an NFL season in its 63-year history, and the station would not carry another Packers game until December 19, 2022, a home matchup with the Los Angeles Rams, as ABC began to simulcast select Monday Night Football games with ESPN.

In 1974, WBAY was sold to Nationwide Communications, which operated the station until 1993, when it was sold to Young Broadcasting along with its two ABC-affiliated sisters WATE-TV in Knoxville, Tennessee, and WRIC-TV in Richmond, Virginia.

=== As an ABC affiliate (1992–present) ===
In 1991, CBS purchased the assets of Midwest Television to acquire its long-dominant affiliate in Minneapolis–Saint Paul, WCCO-TV. Midwest also owned channel 2's longtime competitor, WFRV. CBS considered WBAY a strong affiliate, and tried to sell WFRV and their Escanaba, Michigan–based satellite station, WJMN-TV, after the deal with Midwest closed. However, after FCC rules were relaxed at the time to allow one company to own more stations, the network decided to keep the two stations as a result and switched WFRV/WJMN to CBS in 1992 (CBS sold WFRV/WJMN to Liberty Media in 2007, which in turn sold the stations to Nexstar Media Group in 2011, Nexstar sold WJMN to Sullivan's Landing in 2024 and that station is now operated by Morgan Murphy Media and again an ABC affiliate as the satellite of WBUP).

After it was announced that WFRV would join CBS, channel 2 then decided to take WFRV/WJMN's ABC affiliation; WBAY management insisted that the change take place on or near the anniversary of its sign-on date, March 17. Since that date fell on a Tuesday in 1992, WFRV and WBAY swapped networks on March 15, which fell on a Sunday. This brought WBAY-TV's ABC affiliation in line with sister stations WATE-TV in Knoxville and WRIC-TV in Richmond, which had recently renewed their ABC relationships.

The station formerly preempted the first hour of the ABC lineup (7–8 pm Central) on Tuesday evenings during the football season to carry the local program Tuesday Night Touchback, which was formerly known as Monday Night Countdown before it was moved in 2007 because of Dancing with the Stars and the departure of Monday Night Football from ABC (for most of the 2000s, the slot was among the lowest-rated on ABC's prime time schedule, as was the case with the pre-MNF timeslot). Programs normally seen during that hour then aired later on early Wednesday morning after Jimmy Kimmel Live! during the football season. However, in November 2009, this was changed temporarily due to viewer feedback involving the preemption of the series premiere of V, which forced that program to be aired after the Saturday 10 p.m. newscast; for the remainder of November, V aired at 7 p.m., while Tuesday Night Touchback preempted The Insider and aired before prime time in a truncated half-hour format.

As of 2026, WBAY preempts ABC programming in prime time only for Packers season and playoff preview shows (known as extended editions of its Sunday night sports show, Cover 2), along with some limited local programming, and state political debates as part of WISN-TV's network built around its state-focused Sunday morning talk show, Upfront with Matt Smith & Gerron Jordan (which airs weekly on Sundays following ABC's This Week).

On December 1, 2004, WBAY launched their first permanent digital subchannel service, an internally-run full-time weather feed known then as "Stormcenter 2 24/7", now "First Alert Weather 24/7", featuring a four-pane display of rolling weather conditions, forecasts, traffic reports and advertisements; a seven-day outlook; current radar; and real-time current observations from the regional network of WeatherBug reporting stations. It has never been associated with a national weather network and is run and maintained by the station's meteorologists. It simulcasts the main WBAY channel and goes into a commercial-free format during severe weather events.

Previously, WBAY-DT2 had been activated in the summer of 2004, carrying ABC News Now during the Republican and Democratic conventions, along with that year's presidential election. It also broke format in the spring and summer of 2006 to carry gavel-to-gavel coverage of Steven Avery's trial for the murder of Teresa Halbach, and until the move of special coverage to a secondary webfeed, did so for other trials of interest.

WBAY was one of seven Young-owned stations whose management and operations were handled by Gray Television as part of a proposed takeover of Young Broadcasting by its secured creditors (a plan tentatively approved by a New York bankruptcy judge on July 22, 2009; it was approved in late April 2010). Under Gray management, this made it a semi-sister station in Wisconsin to NBC affiliates WMTV in Madison and WEAU in Eau Claire, and CBS affiliate WSAW-TV in Wausau. The Gray management agreement ended in 2012 as Young returned to some financial stability and the pursuit of a sale partner.

In late January 2010, the station stopped signing off during the early morning hours on Saturdays and Sundays, after a major transmitter problem forced the station to reconsider this mode of operation. WBAY was the last commercial station in the state to start broadcasting 24 hours a day daily, the former off-hours on WBAY's main signal are now taken up by a simulcast of WBAY-DT2.

==== Sale to Media General, then Nexstar and resale to Gray Television (2013–present) ====
On June 6, 2013, Young Broadcasting announced that it would merge with Media General. The sale was approved on November 8, and consummated on November 12. At that time it became both Media General's first station in Wisconsin and the Upper Midwest, and the company's northernmost asset.

On March 21, 2014, LIN Media entered into an agreement to merge with Media General in a $1.6 billion deal. Because LIN already owned WLUK-TV and CW affiliate WCWF (channel 14), with WBAY and WLUK ranking among the four highest-rated stations in the Green Bay market in total day viewership, the companies were required to sell either WBAY or WLUK to another station owner to comply with FCC ownership rules as well as planned changes to those rules regarding same-market television stations which would prohibit sharing agreements. On August 20, 2014, Media General announced that it would retain WBAY, trading WLUK and WCWF to Sinclair Broadcast Group as part of several exchanges between other broadcast groups.

On January 27, 2016, Media General announced that it had entered into a definitive agreement to be acquired by Nexstar Broadcasting Group. Because Nexstar already owned WFRV, it was required to sell that station or WBAY to another owner, though with the financial outlay Nexstar had invested into WFRV since its 2011 purchase, a swap for WBAY was unlikely despite the latter's first-place market ranking.

On June 3, 2016, it was announced that Nexstar would retain WFRV, selling WBAY to Gray Television for $270 million; this time in addition to the original Gray stations in the 2010 management deal, WBAY also became a sister station to CBS affiliate WSAW-TV and Fox affiliate WZAW-LD in Wausau, and dual NBC/Fox affiliate WLUC-TV in Marquette (which had been an on-and-off sister station to WLUK over the years), which Gray acquired more recently. The sale was closed on January 17, 2017, with a possible removal of WBAY on Dish Network due to Gray's previous retransmission consent deal ending averted with a renewal only hours later. The ownership transaction saw WBAY remove the Media General-mandated infotainment program Hollywood Today Live from their schedule (airing in late night on tape delay rather than in the mid-afternoon; the program was canceled at the end of April) after March 3, along with Gray taking control of the station's website and mobile apps. With WBAY now having sister stations statewide, Gray began to distribute WBAY's Sunday night sports show, Sunday Sports Night: Cover 2, to their other stations with the start of the 2017 NFL season.

The station sponsors the yearly "WBAY Boat Show" and the "WBAY RV and Camping Show", both held in the winter months, formerly at the Brown County Arena/Shopko Hall (which moved to the new expo center in 2021), along with a Boy Scout door-to-door food drive ("Scouting for Food") in the fall, and the market's Toys for Tots effort with the Marine Corps Reserve.

== Programming ==
=== Cerebral Palsy Telethon ===
WBAY holds the record for the longest running telethon on the same channel, as it airs the CP Telethon, which has been broadcast on the station since 1954 and benefits Cerebral Palsy, Inc., a local organization involved in the care of cerebral palsy patients and which provides a number of services from their facilities in Green Bay, Suamico, Kimberly, and Two Rivers. The telethon airs for 22 hours from 8 pm. Saturday to 6 pm. Sunday during the first weekend in March, although prior to WBAY switching to 24-hour daily broadcasts in 2010, it broke between midnight and 6 am, as the station signed off in the overnight hours on weekends (the break allowed WBAY's Saturday syndicated programming to air without interruption). Past hosts of the telethon have included Gloria DeHaven, Raymond Burr, Dennis James (who would later host the United Cerebral Palsy national telethon), Dennis Weaver, and Tom Wopat. Currently, the telethon is a local-only effort, using local broadcasters and people to host the broadcast, and the funds raised benefit the local organization. Before the sale of the WBAY stations by the Norbertine Fathers, the telethon was simulcast over WBAY (AM) (later WGEE, now WTAQ) and WBAY-FM (now WIXX).

WBAY's cerebral palsy telethon both pre-dated and succeeded the national telethon for United Cerebral Palsy, which ran on numerous stations nationwide from the mid-1970s to 1997.

=== Sunday Mass ===
The station continues to air a Sunday Mass on Sunday mornings, as it has since signing on under the ownership of the Norbertine Fathers. After the sale of the station, however, the Roman Catholic Diocese of Green Bay began producing the Mass at WBAY's studio. The Diocese provided a presider, choir, liturgical coordinator, and producer while WBAY provided camera operators, a technical director and audio technician.

On December 27, 2009, the Diocese of Green Bay ended local production of the Mass, instead choosing to contract with the Passionist Spiritual Center to carry their nationally syndicated Mass program from Riverhead, New York, by mutual agreement of the station and the Diocese, a transition that was planned two years before and took priority after the September 2009 death of the Diocese's communications director and Mass producer Tony Kuick.

=== News operation ===
WBAY-TV presently broadcasts 36 hours of locally produced newscasts each week (with six hours each weekday and three hours each on Saturdays and Sundays), along with a half-hour sports-focused extension of the Sunday late news known as Sunday Sports Night: Cover 2 in football season (as mentioned above, that program airs statewide on Gray's stations as of September 2017). The station currently exchanges news stories with Hearst Television's WISN-TV in Milwaukee, in addition to airing that station's Wisconsin-focused Sunday morning talk show, UpFront with Adrienne Pedersen. Other sharing partners outside of its Gray sisters in Wisconsin are Quincy Media's slate of ABC stations throughout the western part of the state, and Hubbard Broadcasting's ABC stations in Minneapolis–St. Paul and Duluth, Minnesota. The station uses the NEXRAD radar from the National Weather Service office just north of Austin Straubel International Airport. It formerly maintained an older self-owned Doppler unit until it mothballed the unit and removed its radar dome atop the station's downtown building in 2015.

WBAY's logo for Action 2 News.

WBAY's news operation is branded under the Action News title as Action 2 News, and has used the title since the mid-1980s (with the HD suffix added upon its transition to high definition newscasts), predating its ABC affiliation. The station rarely refreshes its graphical imaging, having only done so four times since 1995, but has maintained long-term dominance in the local ratings for most of its history. Until September 2012, when WFRV debuted its 4 pm newscast, it was the only one in the market to have a late afternoon newscast in that timeslot. In late 2011, the station released mobile applications for iOS and Android devices, followed by a separate weather app for both platforms in February 2013.

Because the station decided to maintain its noon newscast, WBAY-TV was among the few ABC affiliates that carried The Chew on a one-day delay (three days with the Friday edition) at 11 am weekdays due to the network not offering an alternate feed for stations who wish to air the program at an earlier time, which was continued from a one-day delay on All My Children since 1992; this caused complaints among viewers, especially during the holidays when episodes timed to them aired after their occurrence, making the recipes presented in them superfluous. As of September 14, 2015, this was rectified, with The Chew moved to a same-day airing on tape at 2 p.m. and the delay is maintained for the replacement show for The Chew, GMA3: What You Need To Know. The only times of year the station does not run a newscast are on Christmas morning, during the CP telethon, and the evening before Easter when ABC runs The Ten Commandments yearly (due to the film presentation ending after midnight; a one-year shift to an 11 pm show was made in 2020 to provide up-to-date coverage of the COVID-19 pandemic; two days later, the station also added a special weeknight late night newscast from Gray, Full Court Press Now, to their late night schedule for the next month).

The station began the process of upgrading to full HD production with a control room upgrade in the second quarter of 2011, a process hamstrung by the Young bankruptcy until Gray was able to begin operating the company's stations. The news department's conversion began on October 15 after that morning's newscast when construction began on a new set and the relocation of the older set (which had been in use with constant refreshing since the late 1980s) to another part of the building; the new set was completed by mid-December after a training/rehearsal period, using a common set design and graphics package used by all of the New Young stations. On December 14, 2011, WBAY became the second commercial station in the Green Bay market to begin broadcasting its local newscasts in HD (after WFRV-TV, which upgraded on June 23, 2011). Stormcenter 2 24/7 was switched over on March 12, 2012, to a new presentation format with the current graphics package. After all four local news operations established HD or widescreen presences, WBAY dropped the "HD" suffix from their brandings on June 2, 2014. On November 1, 2019, the station unveiled its first new slogan in decades, abandoning "Coverage You Can Count On" for the new tagline "Your First Alert Station" to tie into the push notifications sent from the station's news and weather mobile apps; likewise, weather is now branded as "First Alert Weather". A plan by Gray Television to build a new set to complement the rebranding was delayed to the last part of the second quarter of 2020 due to the COVID-19 pandemic, with the existing set moved to another part of the building, and the station taking advantage of most of the station's weather team presenting their forecasts from home through the early part of the pandemic during the build-out requiring no use of the weather center, allowing it to be constructed with full secrecy (those meteorologists who did need to be in the building stayed in front of the chyron, and their interactions with the anchors were adjusted to obscure there was a new set being built). The new set was unveiled on September 8, 2020.

On September 14, 2020, the station launched two additional newscasts; a 9 a.m. weekday newscast, along with a 4:30 p.m. newscast to create a 2 1/2-hour news block in the mid-afternoon, matching WFRV's scheduling in the same time period. The 4:30 p.m. show is hosted by sports director Chris Roth and has a different format from the station's traditional newscast where Roth checks in with the station's reporters and local subjects in the news for longer-form features regarding those stories, along with an extended weather and astronomy segment with meteorologist Brad Spakowitz entitled "Three Brilliant Minutes" (Spakowitz went into semi-retirement in July 2021, but remains with the station for that segment, along with maintaining its weather systems, and as a backup meteorologist).

From 2019 until 2022, the station carried Full Court Press, a national Sunday morning talk show from Gray featuring Appleton native Greta Van Susteren, who regularly provided commentary to WBAY-TV regarding national and local politics as part of her role as the station group's chief national political analyst. The program ended with Van Susteren's departure to Newsmax TV.

==== Notable former on-air staff ====
- Rob Fowler – meteorologist (1985–1987)
- Jim Hill – sports contributor (1972–1974)
- Orion Samuelson – farm director (1950s)
- Ben Tracy – reporter
- Michelle Tuzee

== Technical information ==
=== Subchannels ===
The station's signal is multiplexed:

Subchannels of WBAY-TV
Subchannel	Res.	Short name	Programming
2.1	720p	WBAY-HD	ABC
2.2	480i	WBAY-WX	First Alert Weather 24/7
2.3	720p	The365	365BLK / MyNetworkTV (Milwaukee Bucks & Minnesota Wild play-by-play)
2.4	480i	WBAY-HI	Heroes & Icons
2.5	480i	WBAYSTV	Start TV
14.3	480i	Charge!	Charge! (WCWF)

Broadcast on behalf of another station

The station currently features their main channel and six other subchannels, with one set aside for the ATSC 1.0 channel for WCWF's third subchannel, which carries Charge as WCWF serves as the market's ATSC 3.0 lighthouse station; likewise, WCWF carries WBAY's main channel in that format, still in 720p. WBAY-TV was the first commercial station in the market to carry subchannel services, doing so in July 2004 when ABC News Now was launched to cover that year's political conventions.

In late June 2010, WBAY-TV became the third commercial station in Green Bay to air syndicated programming (previously only the ABC schedule and ESPN HD broadcasts of Monday Night Football) in high definition. WBAY-TV also began to produce some outside advertising for local businesses and internal station promos in both HD and 16:9 standard definition in mid-2010.

Since July 2013, the station uses the AFD#10 flag to present all programming in letterboxed widescreen for viewers watching on cable television and over-the-air through traditional 4:3 sets, with the same done for 2.2. and 2.3 within the same year; a re-imaging in November 2015 saw the station's graphical image adjusted to meet this presentation mode. The 2.1 signal had a SAP audio channel added in late September 2013, allowing the station to transmit audio description and Spanish-language dubs of ABC network programming, along with a 2017 upgrade to allow automated description of on-screen weather warning scrolls per new FCC rules.

In February 2023, the station added programming from MyNetworkTV to the overnight schedule of WBAY-DT3 after the E. W. Scripps Company declined to renew its affiliation agreement for WACY-TV in the summer of 2022. The move of MyNetworkTV's all-repeat schedule to overnights on a subchannel has become an increasingly common fate for the service, especially for Gray stations. MyNetworkTV programming airs Tuesday through Saturday mornings from 1 to 3 a.m. The subchannel was upgraded to 720p in the summer of 2026, as Gray Media agreed to affiliate WBAY's third subchannel with the new over-the-air television networks for the Minnesota Wild from NHL Productions known as Wild+, and the Milwaukee Bucks from NBA Entertainment, with those broadcasts distributed and marketed by Good Karma Sports; the latter agreement also features 10 broadcasts on WBAY's main channel.

=== Analog-to-digital conversion ===
WBAY-TV shut down its analog signal, over VHF channel 2, on June 12, 2009, the official date on which full-power television stations in the United States transitioned from analog to digital broadcasts under federal mandate. The station's digital signal remained on its pre-transition UHF channel 23, using virtual channel 2.
