= Scray Hill =

Summit in Brown County, Wisconsin

Scray Hill (also known possessively as Scray's Hill) is an 892-foot (272 m) summit in Brown County, Wisconsin, at 44°24′58″N 87°59′48″W. Located just south of De Pere, much of the hill is in the Town of Glenmore; some of its northwestern edges are in the Town of Ledgeview. Scray Hill is home to many television, radio, and communications towers and transmitters, as well as the Central Brown County Water Authority (CBCWA) storage facility.

Scray Hill is part of the Niagara Escarpment (locally called the Ledge), a long, steep slope marking the edge of a plateau that stretches from New York to Wisconsin.

== History ==
The Scray family was among the first settlers on the hill. They farmed, quarried, and constructed the first road on the hill.

The Daanen-Janssen Co. continues to operate and excavate at the Scray Quarry.

Many of the radio stations for Green Bay and the adjacent Fox Cities, and all of the market's television stations, have their transmitting facilities atop of the hill.

According to an urban legend, the nearby golf course, which bore the name Mystery Hills from 1964 to 2003 (now Ledgeview Golf Course), got its name from a magic spot on the road. Many have said you could turn off a car's engine and put the car in neutral, and the car would roll uphill. This gravity hill illusion was written up in Ripley's Believe It or Not! in the early 1930s.

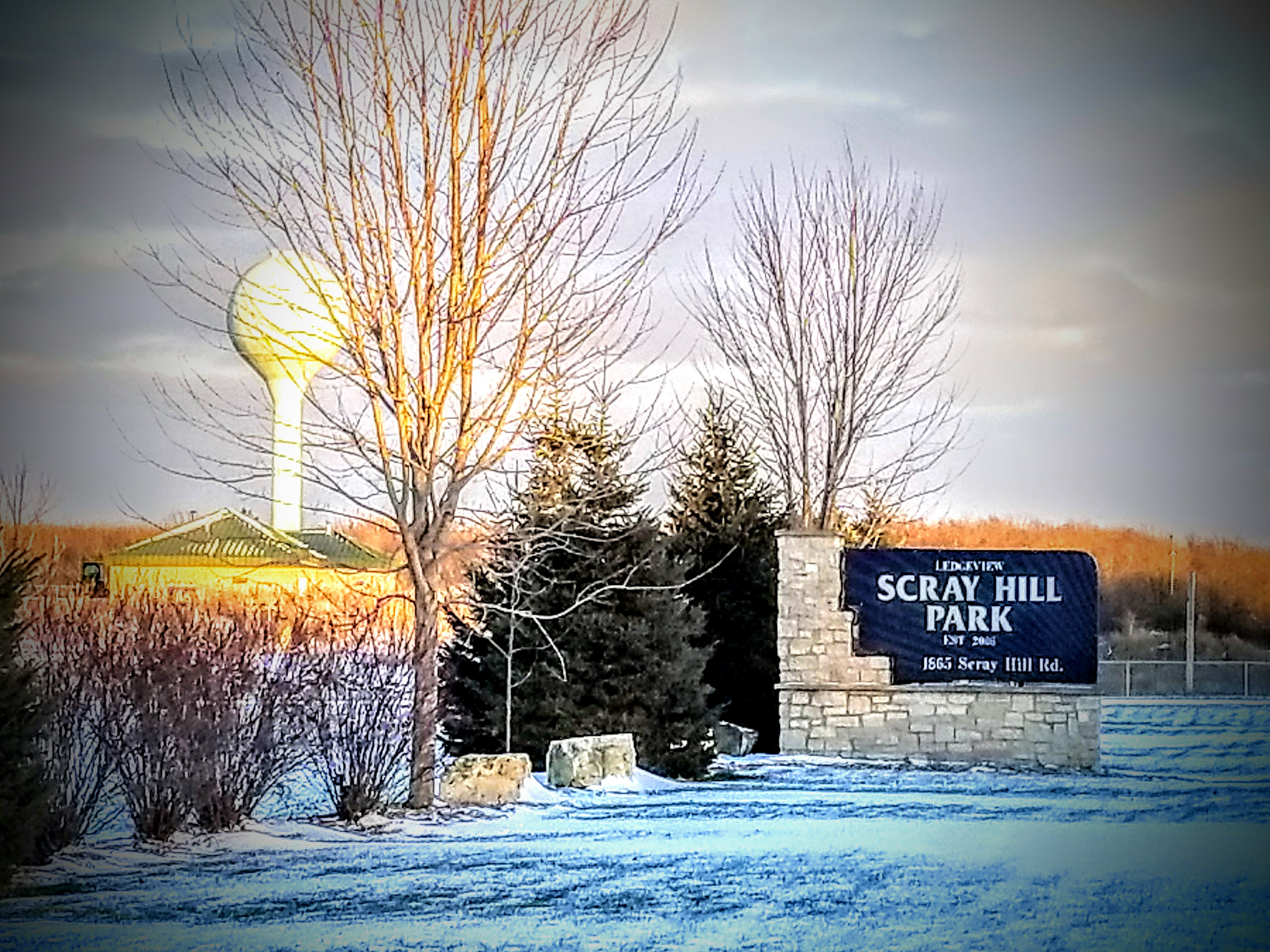
Scray Hill Park

Scray Hill Park is a 17-acre (6.9 ha) park, established in 2008 and opened in 2010, just to the east of the hill's summit.
