= WZOS =

Coordinates: 43°54′21″N 88°53′12″W

Simulcasts WZOR Green Bay
- Berlin, Wisconsin; United States
- Broadcast area: Oshkosh, Fond du Lac, Fox Cities, Wisconsin
- Frequency: 104.7 MHz
- Branding: Razor 94.7 & 104.7

Programming
- Format: Active rock
- Affiliations: Compass Media Networks; United Stations Radio Networks

Ownership
- Owner: Woodward Communications, Inc.
- Sister stations: WAPL, WFZZ, WHBY, WKSZ, WKZY, WSCO, WZOR

History
- First air date: 1972 (as WISS-FM at 102.3)
- Former call signs: WISS-FM (1972–1998); WBJZ (1998–2018)
- Former frequencies: 102.3 MHz (1972–1996)
- Call sign meaning: RaZor OShkosh

Technical information
- Licensing authority: FCC
- Facility ID: 34905
- Class: A
- ERP: 5,200 watts
- HAAT: 107 meters (351 ft)

Links
- Public license information: Public file; LMS
- Webcast: Listen Live
- Website: razorwisconsin.com

WZOS (104.7 FM) is a radio station licensed to Berlin, Wisconsin, that serves the Fox Valley in Northeastern Wisconsin. Owned by Woodward Communications, Inc., the station broadcasts an active rock format, and has been a simulcast of WZOR since June 13, 2018.

== History ==
The station's first format was country music. Afterwards, the station broadcast blues, jazz, classical and standards and was replaced with country music in 2003. The following year, the station started airing smooth jazz until April 3, 2006 at 3PM. The station was then run under a local marketing agreement by Radio Plus of Fond du Lac, and started airing a rhythmic-leaning adult contemporary format as "Magic 104"; the first song on Magic was "Be My Lover" by La Bouche. In April 2008, the LMA agreement with Radio Plus expired and was picked up by Martini Media of Oshkosh. On March 11, 2009 at Midnight, after stunting for an hour with Spanish contemporary music, the station shifted to Top 40/CHR as "B104"; the first song on "B" was "Circus" by Britney Spears.

In March 2018, Caxambas sold the then-WBJZ to Woodward Communications for $720,000. Martini Media contested the purchase in court, petitioning that despite a Permission To Deny in their 2008 agreement it was verbally extended past is its 2013 expiration and that Caxambas sold the station before the Federal Communications Commission (FCC) approved the license transfer. Martini would continue the B104 stream for several months online until entering into a contract with Mountain Dog Media to convert Sheboygan's WCLB (950/107.3), which had recently launched an FM translator, to the same format as "Z107".

On May 1, 2018, Woodward began operating the station and flipped it to a jockless, commercial-free active rock format, as a part of a 1,047-hour stunt (the last song on "B-104" was "Blank Space" by Taylor Swift, which cut off halfway through). It was announced in June that after the conclusion of the marathon, WBJZ would become a simulcast of sister station WZOR/Mishicot as Razor 104.7 on June 13, extending the station's coverage into Fond du Lac and Oshkosh, and rimshotting Appleton. The sale to Woodward Communications was consummated on October 10, 2018; on October 15, Woodward changed the station's call sign to WZOS to better reflect its "Razor" branding.
