= WJLW =

WJLW may refer to:

- WJLW-LP, a low-power radio station (100.3 FM) licensed to serve Greensburg, Pennsylvania, United States
- WKRU, a radio station (106.7 FM) licensed to serve Allouez, Wisconsin, United States, which held the call sign WJLW from 1996 to 2007
- WKSZ, a radio station (95.9 FM) licensed to serve De Pere, Wisconsin, which held the call sign WJLW from 1983 to 1995
