= WYTL =

WYTL may refer to:

- USCG 65' Small harbor tug, a US Coast Guard tug class known as WYTL
- WYTL (FM), a radio station (91.9 FM) licensed to Wyomissing, Pennsylvania
- WIBQ, a radio station (1230 AM) licensed to Terre Haute, Indiana, which held the call sign WYTL from 1987 to 1991
- WOSH, a radio station (1490 AM) licensed to Oshkosh, Wisconsin, which held the call sign WYTL from 1975 to 1984
- WVBO, a radio station (103.9 FM) licensed to Winneconne, Wisconsin, which held the call sign WYTL from in the early 1970s
