= WFDL =

WFDL may refer to:

- WFDL (AM), a radio station (1170 AM) licensed to Waupun, Wisconsin, United States
- WFDL-FM, a radio station (97.7 FM) licensed to Lomira, Wisconsin, United States
