= WFZZ =

Coordinates: 44.524°N 88.332°W

- Seymour, Wisconsin; United States
- Broadcast area: Green Bay-Appleton
- Frequency: 104.3 MHz
- Branding: 104.3 The Fuse

Programming
- Format: Alternative rock

Ownership
- Owner: Woodward Communications, Inc.
- Sister stations: WAPL, WHBY, WKSZ, WKZY, WSCO, WZOR

History
- First air date: 1998 (as WECB)
- Former call signs: WECB (1993–2009); WCHK-FM (2009–2012); WKZG (2012–2023)
- Call sign meaning: W FuZZe

Technical information
- Licensing authority: FCC
- Facility ID: 7120
- Class: A
- ERP: 5,600 watts
- HAAT: 104 meters (341 ft)

Links
- Public license information: Public file; LMS
- Webcast: Listen Live
- Website: www.1043thefuse.com

WFZZ (104.3 FM) is an alternative rock-formatted radio station licensed to Seymour, Wisconsin and serving the Fox Cities and Northeast Wisconsin. Owned and operated by Woodward Communications, WFZZ's studios are located on College Avenue in Appleton, while its transmitter is located in Seymour.

== History ==
=== From the Brookers to "The Breeze" ===
The station launched in the spring of 1998 as WECB under the ownership of Earl Brooker and his wife, Carol (the namesakes of the call letters). Earl Brooker was a local businessman, politician, and long-time Fox Cities radio personality (he worked the 5:30–9:00 morning shift on WECB). Under the Brookers' ownership, WECB featured a 70s Hits format, and also featured broadcasts of Green Bay Gamblers hockey and Wisconsin Timber Rattlers baseball.

Logo as "104.3 The Breeze"

On April 1, 2003, the Brookers sold WECB to Dubuque, Iowa-based Woodward Communications, with the station joining Woodward's Northeast Wisconsin radio cluster. On July 18, 2003, after two days of stunting with various versions of "Summer Breeze", Woodward would change WECB's format to Soft Adult Contemporary as "104.3 The Breeze, Northeast Wisconsin's Lite Rock". "The Breeze" featured a schedule that included the John Tesh Radio Show (Monday–Saturday mornings), as well as all-Christmas music annually during November and December.

=== "Chuck FM" ===
Logo as "Chuck FM" (2009–2012)

In December 2009, WECB continued its holiday music past Christmas, with the promise that "one more gift" would be presented at 3 p.m. on December 31; along with that announcement, cryptic advertisements asking "Hey! Where's Chuck?" appeared in local newspapers. At 3 p.m. on December 31 (after Gayla Peevey's "I Want a Hippopotamus for Christmas" finished playing), WECB became WCHK-FM and introduced a new adult hits format under the branding of "Chuck FM", with The Rolling Stones' "Start Me Up" the first song being played. "Chuck FM" was patterned after the Jack FM-style of adult hits stations, in that the music playlist was generally wide-ranging, hard-edged voiceover liners were used in lieu of DJs, and the on-air presentation was irreverent; such irreverence was highlighted by WCHK-FM's decision to "play nothing" but dead air during the Green Bay Packers' appearance in Super Bowl XLV in February 2011 (outside of FCC required legal IDs). (A Fox Valley-based competitor, Midwest Communications-owned WYDR, would adopt the Jack FM format six years later, in October 2015.)

=== "KZ" ===
Logo as "KZ", 2012-2013, 2016-2022; the logo as "KZ Radio" while simulcasting on WKZY was similar, but would replace the 104.3 portion with "Radio".

On November 1, 2012, at midnight, "Chuck FM" was dropped from WCHK-FM, and the station began playing round-the-clock Christmas music (as "The Christmas Station"), a move not made by WCHK-FM or any other Green Bay/Appleton radio station during the holiday season since the days leading up to "Chuck FM's" debut at the end of 2009. The all-Christmas stunting ended at midnight on the morning of December 26, when the station (which changed its call sign to WKZG on November 9) flipped to "KZ104.3", which featured adult hits from the 1980s and 1990s and a core artist list that includes artists such as George Michael, Bon Jovi, and Madonna (the latter artist's "Vogue" was the first song played). Unlike "Chuck FM's" DJ-free format, "KZ104.3" featured on-air personalities, including Mario Lopez's national show at nights and local staff including the husband-and-wife team of Doug Erickson and Mary Love, who hosted WKZG's morning shift after moving over from the morning slot at Top 40 sister station WKSZ.

On September 16, 2013, "KZ104.3" began simulcasting on its Chilton-licensed sister station WKZY (92.9 FM), which as WXMM had aired a contemporary country music format since its September 2011 sign-on. The simulcast move allowed "KZ104.3," which would be rechristened "KZ Radio" in early 2014, to extend its reach to better cover the Southern Fox Valley, including the cities of Oshkosh and Fond du Lac, where its main 104.3 signal may be hard to reach.

The 104.3/92.9 simulcast was dropped on February 15, 2016, when WKZY switched to a simulcast of its Top 40 sister station WKSZ. In addition, morning hosts Doug and Mary moved back to WKSZ's morning slot on the same day, and WKZG would revert to the "KZ104.3" moniker. On February 25, WKZG tweaked their format by incorporating more material from the 2000s to recent times, though the station still included 1980s and 1990s songs.

On April 15, 2019, WKZG shifted to adult contemporary, while retaining the "KZ104.3" branding.

=== "The Fuse" ===
On November 1, 2022, WKZG shifted to Christmas music, seemingly innocuously as the station continued to use the "KZ" branding and gave little, if any, indication of any change after the holidays, as the station had switched to Christmas music during the holiday season for the past three years. However, on November 23, it was disclosed by radio news website RadioInsight that Woodward had applied for new WFZZ call letters for the station, to take effect on January 3, 2023; in addition, an anonymous registration was made for 1043thefuse.com in August.

These reports of a format change would ultimately prove to be true, as the station dropped the "KZ" branding at 9 a.m. on December 27 and began stunting once again, looping the entire playlist of "Weird Al" Yankovic as "Weird Al Radio" (beginning with "Amish Paradise", followed by "White and Nerdy", "Smells Like Nirvana", "Dare to Be Stupid", and "I Love Rocky Road"). The move was believed to be playing off of a boost in his popularity in 2022 with the release of his biography film Weird: The Al Yankovic Story.

At 3 p.m. on January 3, 2023, after playing "The Alternative Polka" (an apparent final hint at the future format), followed by the short "Bite Me" piece (the hidden track at the end of Off the Deep End), the station, now under the WFZZ call letters, flipped to a gold-based alternative rock format, branded as "104.3 The Fuse". "The Fuse", which launched with "What's My Age Again?" by Blink-182, is Woodward's third rock-formatted station in the Green Bay/Fox Cities area, following classic rock mainstay WAPL (105.7 FM) and the "Razor" active rock simulcast on WZOR (94.7 FM) and WZOS (104.7 FM). It also fills a void in the market for alternative that was left when Cumulus Media-owned WKRU dropped the format for classic rock at the end of 2017.
