= WUSW (disambiguation) =

WUSW is a radio station licensed to serve Niagara Falls, New York.

WUSW may also refer to:

- WMAY-FM, a radio station (92.7 FM) licensed to serve Taylorville, Illinois, United States, which held the call sign WUSW from 2015 to 2021
- WOZN (AM), a radio station (1670 AM) licensed to serve Madison, Wisconsin, United States, which held the call sign WUSW in 2015
- WFFX, a radio station (103.7 FM) licensed to serve Hattiesburg, Mississippi, United States, which held the call sign WUSW from 1999 to 2010
- WWWX, a radio station (96.9 FM) licensed to serve Oshkosh, Wisconsin, United States, which held the call sign WUSW from 1989 to 1999
