= WMDC =

WMDC may refer to:

- Windows Mobile Device Center
- WMDC (FM), a radio station (98.7 FM) licensed to Mayville, Wisconsin, United States
- Wakefield Metropolitan District Council, a local authority within West Yorkshire, United Kingdom.
- Weapons of Mass Destruction Commission, an organization funded by the Swedish government and led by Hans Blix
- Wikimedia DC, a local chapter of the Wikimedia Foundation
