= WZOR =

Radio station in Mishicot–Green Bay, Wisconsin

Coordinates: 44.342°N 87.786°W

Mishicot, Wisconsin; United States
- Broadcast area: Green Bay, Wisconsin
- Frequency: 94.7 MHz
- Branding: Razor 94.7 & 104.7

Programming
- Format: Active rock
- Affiliations: Compass Media Networks; United Stations Radio Networks

Ownership
- Owner: Woodward Communications
- Sister stations: WAPL, WFZZ, WHBY, WKSZ, WKZY, WSCO, WZOS

History
- First air date: 1994 (as WGBM)
- Former call signs: WGBM (1994–2000)
- Call sign meaning: RaZOR

Technical information
- Licensing authority: FCC
- Facility ID: 4098
- Class: C3
- ERP: 21,500 watts
- HAAT: 108 meters
- Repeater: 104.7 WZOS (Berlin)

Links
- Public license information: Public file; LMS
- Webcast: Listen Live
- Website: www.razorwisconsin.com

WZOR (94.7 FM) is a commercial radio station serving the Green Bay, Fox Cities and lakeshore areas of Northeastern Wisconsin. The station is licensed to the Manitowoc County community of Mishicot, Wisconsin, and airs an active rock music format as "Razor 94.7 & 104.7". WZOR's studios are located on College Avenue in Appleton, while its transmitter is located near Denmark.

== History and programming ==
The station launched on December 16, 1994, as WGBM, and previously aired adult contemporary and classic country formats before being sold to current owner Woodward Communications in 2000.

"Razor 94.7" WZOR debuted at 9:47 a.m. on February 28, 2000, with "Head Like a Hole" by Nine Inch Nails being the first song played. When the station debuted, it started with 94 days straight of just music. After that, the very first DJ, who was then Assistant Program Director Roxanne Steele, took to air. At this time, sister station WAPL program director Joe Calgaro was running the station. It did not take long for Roxanne to then take over the station completely and become program director. She brought on Pete Burns to anchor nights, along with The Local Edge, and Over the Edge. In 2005, then-afternoon host Cutter became Roxanne's Assistant. In 2007, after Steele had left, Calgaro took over as Razor PD once again with the help from Cutter, but in late 2008, she was brought back, this time as Promotions Director for both Razor and sister station WAPL. In March 2009, after Cutter had left, then-WAPL assistant program director Elwood took over the APD duties for WZOR as well. In late 2012, Calgaro resigned and moved to Milwaukee to take over WHQG. Elwood was promoted to Program Director again for both stations and parent company Woodward Communications brought back Cutter to host afternoons and handle Social Media and music duties.

WZOR won the RadioContraband Rock Radio Award for "Small Market Radio Station" 2013 and 2014.

In 2018, Woodward acquired WBJZ in Berlin, Wisconsin; on June 13, 2018, the station became a simulcast of WZOR. On October 15, 2018, Woodward changed the call sign to WZOS.

=== The Morning Razor ===
The Morning Razor was the name of the morning show from late 2000 until March 2009, when Woodward began syndicating The Free Beer and Hot Wings Show from across Lake Michigan in Grand Rapids, Michigan. The show's first host was Driver. In 2001, The Kidd was brought in. Over his tenure, Kidd had many different co-hosts, including comedian Mike Merryfield and comedian Mike Prell. After Mike Prell left, radio morning veteran Bryan Scott (also known as Bill Ding) became the co-host. Bill left in 2006 to go to competitor Y100. Shortly after, Kidd also left. In their place, former WAPL/WLUM/WJJO DJ Rex Charger took over The Morning Razor. In late 2007, then APD and afternoon host Cutter took over until the move to syndicated programming.
