= WAPL =

- Appleton, Wisconsin; United States
- Broadcast area: Appleton, Oshkosh, Green Bay
- Frequency: 105.7 MHz
- Branding: 105.7 WAPL

Programming
- Format: Mainstream rock
- Affiliations: United Stations Radio Networks

Ownership
- Owner: Woodward Communications, Inc.
- Sister stations: WFZZ, WHBY, WKSZ, WKZY, WSCO, WZOR

History
- First air date: December 24, 1965 (as WAPL-FM)
- Former call signs: WAPL-FM (1963–1977); WCXR (1977); WAPL-FM (1977–2008)
- Call sign meaning: City of license of Appleton, calls moved from the former AM station

Technical information
- Licensing authority: FCC
- Facility ID: 73659
- Class: C
- ERP: 100,000 watts
- HAAT: 358 meters (1175 feet)
- Transmitter coordinates: 44°21′32″N 87°59′07″W

Links
- Public license information: Public file; LMS
- Webcast: Listen Live
- Website: www.wapl.com

WAPL (105.7 FM) is a Mainstream rock formatted radio station licensed to Appleton, Wisconsin, that serves the Green Bay and Appleton-Oshkosh areas. The station is owned by Woodward Communications, and has studios on College Avenue in Appleton, with transmitting facilities located near the WGBA Tower west of unincorporated Shirley in the Town of Glenmore in southeastern Brown County.

== Beginnings ==
WAPL radio made its on-air debut in 1952, operating on a frequency of 1570 AM under the ownership of the Bartell family. It was the third AM station in the market, but the first to serve the younger audience with rock and roll music.

WAPL-FM, operating on a frequency of 105.7 MHz, was added in 1965 when an FM antenna was installed on the existing WAPL (AM) tower in Menasha. The initial power was around 20,000 watts at an antenna height of 160 feet. The station's format was beautiful music.

In 1965, WAPL-FM was upgraded to a 50,000-watt signal at 200 feet with a new tower on The Zuelke Building in downtown Appleton.

By 1977, having gone through a number of ownership and format changes, WAPL-FM changed its call letters to WCXR and briefly became a Christian station. This change lasted only eight months before changing format again, this time to album rock. Shortly thereafter, the station's call letters reverted to WAPL-FM. The on-air line up included Laura Morgan, Dan Adams and program director Steve Brown.

== The Rockin' Apple ==
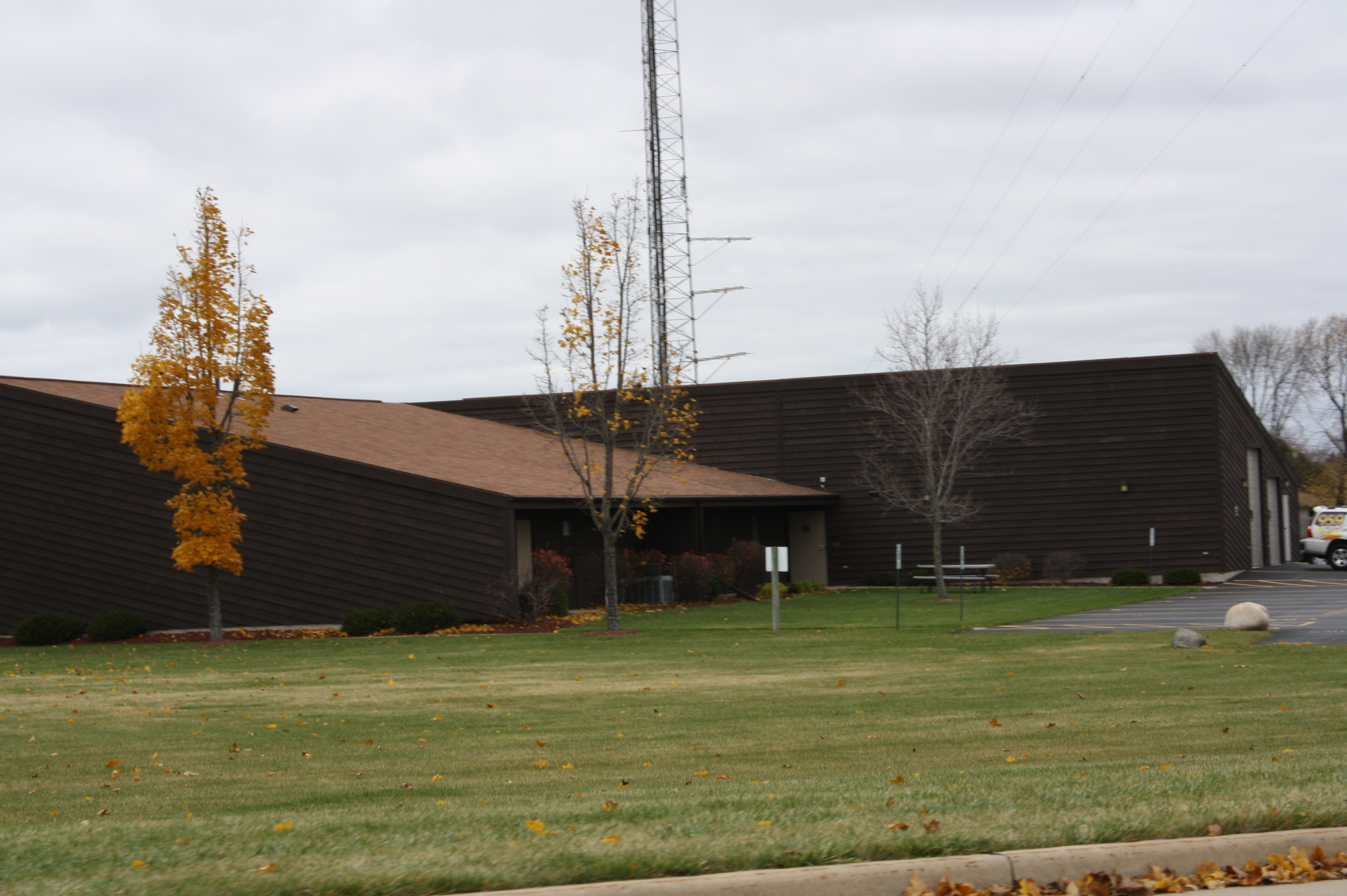
Studios

In 1978, WAPL AM and FM were offered for sale. WAPL-FM was purchased by Woodward Communications, Inc., of Dubuque, Iowa. Woodward already owned an AM station, WHBY, in the Appleton market. A strategy was developed to include the newly purchased station in the already planned new facility for WHBY on Appleton's southeast side. The plans included an upgrade of WAPL's signal to 100,000 watts of power and 450 feet of height for the antenna.

The new facilities were completed in the early fall of 1979, and WAPL and its new sister station, WHBY, won the Broadcast Management and Engineering award for "Best AM/FM Station" of 1979. Soon after the construction was complete, the Federal Communications Commission (FCC) ruled that high power FM station like WAPL should be at least 100,000 watts at 1000 feet. Immediately, the planning began for a new transmitter site which would allow WAPL to remain a Class C FM transmitting facility. During this time, most of the WAPL air staff went by only their first names and was composed of Robin, Dale, Cliff, Carl King, Laura Morgan, Mark Coulter and Operations Manager Dan Davis.

In October 1980, WAPL-FM began identifying itself as "The Rockin' Apple", under program director Wayne Shayne. WAPL would continue to use the nickname until 2002, at which time the station was re-branded as "Wisconsin's Rock Station". "The Rockin' Apple" was brought back as a station identifier in 2007 as preparations were being made for WAPL's 30th Anniversary celebration. In addition to Shayne, other members of the air staff during WAPL's history have included Rick Panneck, David Lee, Laura Morgan, Bob Baron, Rick Blades, and Nate Wright (Night Nate).

In April 1985, "The Mark and McNeal Morning Show" debuted with Mark Coulter, Rick McNeal and newsman Len Nelson. While Coulter departed after only eight months, McNeal and Nelson continued doing the morning show together until January 1999, when Nelson left the station to become news director of WGEE (now WTAQ) and was replaced by John Jordan. McNeal and Jordan would continue on the "Rockin' Apple Morning Show" until April 2002, when WAPL management dropped the show in favor of "Bob and Brian," a show originating from Milwaukee's WLZR (now WHQG). "Bob and Brian" aired on WAPL until March 2003. The syndicated show was a bust with Rockin' Apple listeners, causing WAPL to drop it in favor of a local, music-intensive morning shift. ("Bob and Brian" would eventually resurface in the Fox Cities radio market on WWWX.) In September 2003, WAPL reunited Rick McNeal and Len Nelson at their 25th Anniversary Celebration and announced that they would return to the station to once again helm the morning show.

WAPL received a construction permit August 27, 1987 to increase tower height and become a full Class C FM, nearly eight years after applying for it. The new transmitting facility was completed southeast of Green Bay in rural Shirley at a height of 1,175 feet above average terrain near WGBA-TV's transmitter, making the station "The 100,000 Watt Blowtorch of the Midwest". The station can be heard as far west from towns west of Wausau, as far east as cities across Lake Michigan such as Ludington and as far north as Iron Mountain, MI. The signal easily reaches the northern portions of the Milwaukee market, though a translator activated in 2015 broadcasting Milwaukee's AM sports station WSSP, also carried on 105.7, has removed some access to WAPL in that market.

The Rockin' Apple celebrated its 30th anniversary in 2008. WAPL was recognized by the American Red Cross in 2002 as Outstanding Media Partner for their fund raising efforts following the September 11 attacks in 2001. In addition to being a national Marconi Award finalist in 2006, WAPL has won numerous Wisconsin Area Music Industry Awards and was nominated for 2008 Station of the Year. WAPL remains radio-active in the community through charitable campaigns such as Rock Against Hunger, Rock For Kids, and Rock For The Cure. They partner annually with the Leukemia-Lymphoma Society, American Cancer Society, Children's Hospital, Paul's Pantry, and area domestic abuse shelters in raising nearly a million dollars for local charities. The current WAPL line-up includes The Rick and Cutter Show with news anchor Erin Davisson, The Liquid Lunch with Ross Maxwell, The Afternoon Road Show with Elwood and John Jordan, Andy Gardner, Home Brewed, House of Hair with Dee Snider, Nights with Alice Cooper, and Sammy Hagar's Top Rock Countdown.

In 2002, 105.7 FM and AM 1570 once again became sister stations. WAPL owner Woodward Communications, Inc. purchased 1570 WRJQ and immediately changed the call letters to WSCO and installed a Sports Talk format, replacing WRJQ's big band format. In addition to WHBY and WSCO, WAPL's other sister stations include the to

- 95.9 WKSZ, running a Top 40 (CHR) format as "95.9 KISS FM"
- 94.7 WZOR, Active Rock-formatted "Razor 94.7"
- 104.3 WFZZ, Alternative rock-formatted "The Fuse"

In late 2007, WAPL began streaming its radio broadcast online via the World Wide Web.

On April 8, 2008, the station's official call letters were changed by the FCC from WAPL-FM to simply WAPL. (AM 1570's "WAPL" call sign had been changed in 1978, enabling 105.7 FM to drop the "-FM" suffix.)

In the 2009 NFL season, the station began to carry Green Bay Packers radio broadcasts, sharing rights with WHBY, giving Green Bay/Fox Cities listeners three choices to listen to the games via FM, including Midwest Communications's WTAQ (1360/97.5), which came to FM in 2010, and WIXX (101.1). Technically, however, WAPL is considered only the network's Appleton/Fox Cities FM affiliate, and not a primary station in the Packers Radio Network, despite its near-equivalent signal from Glenmore to WIXX. This had a consequence of forcing WAPL to carry the Westwood One national call instead of Packers Radio Network coverage for the 2011 NFC Championship Game and Super Bowl XLV, leaving listeners to WTAQ and WIXX for the local call of both games. Midwest outbid Woodward for the Fox Cities rights in April 2022, and the rights have now shifted to WYDR (94.3).

== Awards ==
In 1990, under Program Director Garrett Hart, WAPL-FM was chosen "Best Radio Station" by the readers of Rolling Stone Magazine. The award was the first of five such awards won by the staff of The Rockin' Apple. The station's line-up included Hart, Nelson and McNeal, Baron, Tony Scott, Jeannie Wilde, Shane Reno, Dave Wayne, Sharon Hunter, Chris Dare and Bob Crew.

In 1990, Rick McNeal was also one of five finalists for the National Association of Broadcasters Marconi Award for Best Medium Market Personality.

After being the Rolling Stone magazine runner-up in 1991, WAPL would again win the "Best Radio Station" award from the readers of Rolling Stone in 1992, followed by a third award in four years in 1993. Joining Hart, Nelson, McNeal, Baron, Wilde, Scott and Crew were Miles Walker, Karla Moore, Andy Hammer and Linda Shane. The Rockin' Apple repeated yet again in 1994 and 1995, with an airstaff including Pete Burns, Susan Currie, Ross Maxwell, Roxanne Steele, Randy Hawke, Jamie Powers and Bill Kidd. Rolling Stone discontinued the "Best Radio Station" category from it annual Readers' Poll the following year.

After replacing longtime WAPL Program Director Garrett Hart in 1997, new PD Randy Hawke led WAPL to a win as Radio and Records' "Best Small Market Rock Radio Station" in 1999. At that time, the airstaff included Rick McNeal and John Jordan in mornings, Hawke, Roxanne Steele, Ross Maxwell, Pete Burns, Scott Stevens, Rex Charger, and Desiree.

In 2006, under Program Director Joe Calgaro, WAPL was selected as one of five finalists for the Marconi Award for National Rock Radio Station of the Year. The Marconis, presented by the National Association of Broadcasters are considered the Oscars of the radio industry.

Nominated again in 2008, this time WAPL brought home the Marconi Award for National Rock Station of the Year. The Staff included Program Director Joe Calgaro, Promotions Director Elwood, and Music Director Borna Velic. The on-air line-up consisted of Rick McNeal, Len Nelson, and Jeanne Anthony of The Rick & Len Show, Karla Moore, Elwood, Joe Calgaro, Scott Stevens, and Ross Maxwell. WAPL won the 2010 Radio Station of the Year award at the Wisconsin Area Music Industry (WAMI) awards.

In May 2011, WAPL was named the first ever Medium Market Music Station of the Year by the Wisconsin Broadcasters Association. The air-staff included Rick and Len in the morning, Roxanne Steele, Elwood, Joe Calgaro and John Jordan in the afternoon, Scott Stevens, Borna Velic, and Ross Maxwell.

In September 2011, WAPL again won the National Association of Broadcaster's Marconi Award for National Rock Station of the Year. It was the second time WAPL received the award in 3 years.

In May 2012, WAPL was named Medium Market Music Station of the Year for the second consecutive year by the Wisconsin Broadcasters Association. The air-staff included Rick and Len in the morning, Roxanne Steele, Elwood, Joe Calgaro and John Jordan in the afternoon, Scott Stevens, Borna Velic, and Ross Maxwell.

== Birth gift to Prince William ==
WAPL shares its "initials" with Prince William, Duke of Cambridge, the heir to the British throne, whose full name is William Arthur Philip Louis. Upon the birth of the future king in June 1982, WAPL sent gifts to Buckingham Palace. The story was reported in papers and radio broadcasts in the US, Canada, Australia and throughout the United Kingdom. WAPL received a note of thanks from Prince Charles and Princess Diana that informed them that the Royal Family is not allowed to accept gifts, but that the items would be donated to charity.
