= WDUZ =

Radio station in Green Bay, Wisconsin

WDUZ and WDUZ-FM

WDUZ: Green Bay, Wisconsin; WDUZ-FM: Brillion, Wisconsin; United States
- Broadcast area: Green Bay, Wisconsin
- Frequencies: WDUZ: 1400 kHz; WDUZ-FM: 107.5 MHz
- Branding: Sports Radio 107.5 and 1400 The Fan

Programming
- Format: Sports
- Affiliations: Westwood One Sports; Green Bay Rockers

Ownership
- Owner: Cumulus Media; (Cumulus Licensing LLC)
- Sister stations: WKRU, WOGB, WQLH

History
- First air date: WDUZ: August 22, 1947; WDUZ-FM: 1993
- Former call signs: WDUZ: WNGB (2003–2004); WDUZ-FM: WEZR (1989–1999); WXWX (1999–2003)
- Call sign meaning: Named after Duz laundry soap

Technical information
- Licensing authority: FCC
- Facility ID: WDUZ: 25119; WDUZ-FM: 6861
- Class: WDUZ: C; WDUZ-FM: C3
- Power: WDUZ: 1,000 watts (unlimited)
- ERP: WDUZ-FM: 3,600 watts
- HAAT: WDUZ-FM: 268 meters (879 ft)
- Transmitter coordinates: WDUZ: 44°29′36.0″N 87°59′13.0″W; WDUZ-FM: 44°21′32″N 87°59′7.4″W
- Translator(s): WDUZ: 95.5 W238DA (Green Bay)

Links
- Public license information: WDUZ: Public file; LMS; WDUZ-FM: Public file; LMS
- Webcast: Listen live
- Website: www.thefan1075.com

WDUZ (1400 kHz) and WDUZ-FM (107.5 MHz) are radio stations serving the Green Bay, Wisconsin area, simulcasting a sports format as "Sports Radio 107.5 and 1400 The Fan". The stations were owned by Clear Channel Communications, though they were still operated by their previous owner, Cumulus Media, who swapped ownership of both stations (and there other Green Bay signals) to Clear Channel in exchange for two Ohio stations in early 2009. In August 2013, Clear Channel reached a deal to sell its Green Bay stations back to Cumulus. The sale was consummated on December 31, 2013, at a price of $17,636,643.

WDUZ's studios and AM transmitter are located on Victoria Street in Green Bay, while the FM transmitter is located near Shirley in the Town of Glenmore.

== WDUZ history ==
WDUZ went on the air in 1947 under the ownership of Green Bay Broadcasting Company, formed by veteran Wisconsin broadcaster Ben A. Laird. The station's format until the 1990s consisted of an eclectic mix of music; during the late 1950s and much of the 1960s, early morning music consisted of a mix of polka and country music, easy listening and middle-of-the-road music during the daytime, and rock and roll music from 7 p.m. to midnight. News content on WDUZ included Paul Harvey's ABC Radio commentaries; Harvey had credited Ben Laird for suggesting to ABC Radio that Harvey's show should air nationwide on the network. By the mid-1990s, WDUZ would morph into a mixed bag of adult contemporary music, news, sports, and talk radio, eventually going to full-time sports talk in July 1996 (as "Sports Radio 14 The Fan"). Cumulus Broadcasting purchased WDUZ and its sister station WQLH in the fall of 1999.

In the 1970s and early 1980s, WDUZ sponsored the WDUZ Mod Squad, a community fund raiser basketball team that included Disc Jockeys and other local celebrities. They also sponsored a softball team under the same name.

In October 2003, Cumulus moved the callsign WDUZ and sports format to its station on 107.5 FM (the former WXWX) and turned 1400 AM into a talk radio station ("Super Talk 1400 WNGB"), a format that featured nationally syndicated talk programming such as shows from G. Gordon Liddy and Bill O'Reilly. WNGB's ratings performance proved dismal, and in August 2004, Cumulus returned the WDUZ calls and sports talk format to 1400 AM, in a full simulcast with 107.5 (which remained WDUZ-FM).

== WDUZ-FM history ==
Programming on the 107.5 FM frequency dates back to as far as February 1993, when it was a beautiful music/easy listening station under the callsign WEZR. Around the mid-1990s, the format changed to smooth jazz while still under the WEZR call sign. Cumulus Broadcasting purchased the station in March 1998 and immediately dropped the jazz format. After a weekend of stunting with Orson Welles' "The War of the Worlds" (mixed in with Elton John's "Rocket Man"), WEZR became "The Planet 107-5," a mix of adult contemporary and eclectic rock, on March 23.

"The Planet" format lasted only one year. On April 1, 1999, Cumulus flipped WEZR (and its country music sister station in Appleton, 96.9 FM WUSW) to a modern rock simulcast as "97 and 107 The Fox." With that format flip, 107.5 would take the callsign WXWX (while WUSW changed to WWWX).

The "Fox" simulcast lasted until October 2003, when Cumulus began simulcasting WDUZ's sports talk programming on 107.5. (WWWX would continue as a stand-alone rock station serving the Fox Cities area.)

== "The Fan" programming ==
The WDUZ schedule emphasizes local sports talk programming. "The Fan" also featured some national talk and live event programming from ESPN Radio until dropping the network on January 2, 2013, and affiliating with Infinity Sports Network, which is distributed by Cumulus Media and whose schedule includes The Jim Rome Show, a longtime part of WDUZ's schedule (Rome was distributed by Premiere Networks before joining CBS Sports Radio).

"The Fan" served as radio home of UW-Green Bay Phoenix men's and women's basketball until the 2013–2014 season. They are the Green Bay radio home for Wisconsin Badgers athletics and Marquette Basketball. The Fan also carries NFL games through Westwood One. From 2000 to 2004, both frequencies served as Green Bay's flagship stations for Green Bay Packers football. During that time, Milwaukee Brewers baseball and Milwaukee Bucks basketball also aired on "The Fan." The Packers, Brewers, and Bucks would all move over to Midwest Communications' sports-talker WNFL in 2005; the Packers and Brewers now air on its sister station, WTAQ.
