= WQLH =

Coordinates: 44.645°N 88.137°W

Green Bay, Wisconsin; United States
- Broadcast area: Green Bay-Appleton-Oshkosh
- Frequency: 98.5 MHz
- Branding: Star 98

Programming
- Format: Hot adult contemporary
- Affiliations: Westwood One

Ownership
- Owner: Cumulus Media; (Cumulus Licensing LLC)
- Sister stations: WDUZ-AM-FM, WKRU, WOGB

History
- First air date: 1967 (as WDUZ-FM)
- Former call signs: WDUZ-FM (1967–1990)
- Call sign meaning: We're Quality Light Hits (former slogan)

Technical information
- Licensing authority: FCC
- Facility ID: 25121
- Class: C1
- ERP: 100,000 watts
- HAAT: 152 meters (499 ft)

Links
- Public license information: Public file; LMS
- Webcast: Listen live
- Website: www.star98.net

WQLH (98.5 FM, "Star 98") is a hot adult contemporary formatted radio station licensed to Green Bay, Wisconsin and serving Green Bay, Appleton, Oshkosh, and Northeast Wisconsin. The station is owned and operated by Cumulus Media. WQLH's studios are located on Victoria Street in Green Bay, while its transmitter is located near Suamico.

== History ==
The station launched on July 1, 1967, as WDUZ-FM, the sister station to WDUZ, on 98.3 with 3,000 watts and a minimal antenna height of 77', and aired a beautiful music format until January 15, 1990. At that time, the station shifted to a soft adult contemporary format as "Light 98.5 WQLH" (meaning "Quality Light Hits"). The format would evolve into a more modern (and more upbeat) hot adult contemporary playlist by the mid-1990s (with the station being rebranded as "98.5 Mix FM"), eventually adopting the "Star 98" branding in December 1999, when the station was purchased by Cumulus Media.

Cumulus swapped WQLH and four other Green Bay stations to Clear Channel in 2009 in exchange for two Cincinnati radio stations; however, Cumulus continued to operate the stations. In August 2013, Clear Channel reached a deal to sell the five stations back to Cumulus.
