= WWWX =

Radio station in Oshkosh, Wisconsin

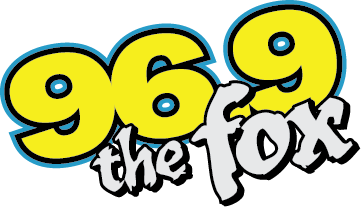
- Oshkosh, Wisconsin; United States
- Broadcast area: Appleton-Oshkoss
- Frequency: 96.9 MHz
- Branding: 96.9 The Fox

Programming
- Format: Alternative rock
- Affiliations: Compass Media Networks

Ownership
- Owner: Cumulus Media; (Cumulus Licensing, LLC)
- Sister stations: WNAM; WOSH; WPKR; WVBO

History
- First air date: January 30, 1967 (as WMKC at 96.7)
- Former call signs: WMKC (1967–1980); WAHC (1980–1989); WUSW (1989–1999)
- Former frequencies: 96.7 MHz (1967–1991)
- Call sign meaning: Was paired with WXWX in Green Bay

Technical information
- Licensing authority: FCC
- Facility ID: 50052
- Class: A
- ERP: 6,000 watts
- HAAT: 100 meters
- Transmitter coordinates: 44.100°N 88.534°W

Links
- Public license information: Public file; LMS
- Webcast: Listen live
- Website: www.fox969.com

WWWX (96.9 FM, "96.9 The Fox") is an alternative rock formatted radio station licensed to Oshkosh, Wisconsin, that serves the Appleton-Oshkosh area. The station is owned by Cumulus Media. The station shares a transmitter site with WNAM located along I-41.

== History ==
The station signed on January 30, 1967, as WMKC, operating on 96.7 FM under the ownership of Kimball Broadcasting. In 1968, the station became an affiliate of the ABC FM network. By 1971, WMKC had a middle of the road format, and devoted 20 hours a week to jazz music. The station changed its affiliation to the Mutual Broadcasting System in 1978; by then, programming also included three hours of classical music.

Kimball Broadcasting, a subsidiary of the Miles Kimball mail order company, sold WMKC to Cummings Communications for $400,000 in 1980. The new owners changed the call letters of the station to WAHC, which at the time carried a beautiful music format. Several short lived format changes came through the station after the sale. WAHC tried an album oriented rock format which did not attract listeners, then by December 1982 switched back to middle of the road. In September 1983, facing audience ratings of less than 1% of the market, it made another format switch, this time to contemporary hit radio under the moniker "SuperHit 97"; the station was affiliated with the RKO Radio Network and competed with WIXX. WAHC kept this format until 1987, when it switched to modern country. ODON Communications bought the station in 1988 and changed its call letters to WUSW in 1989. In 1991, a reallocation of various FM frequencies in Wisconsin moved WUSW to 96.9 FM.

In January 1997, WUSW and WNAM were sold to Value Radio Corporation, who in turn sold them to Cumulus Media on August 31, 1997. On April 1, 1999, the station began simulcasting a rock format, branded "The Fox", with WEZR (107.5 FM) in Green Bay and changed its call letters to WWWX. The simulcast ended in 2003, when the Green Bay station (which had become WXWX) took on the sports radio format of WDUZ; the "Fox" format would continue on WWWX.

After Cumulus Media swapped its Green Bay radio stations to Clear Channel Communications for two stations in Cincinnati and entered into a local marketing agreement to retain control of the Green Bay stations (which Cumulus reacquired in 2013), WWWX, along with WZNN in Allouez, Wisconsin, was placed into a trust, WI Radio, LLC, that was required to sell the stations. In 2013, WWWX was transferred to another trust, Current Radio, LLC. After Cumulus moved WOGB's city of license from Kaukauna (part of the Appleton market) to Reedsville (part of the Green Bay market) in August 2013, Cumulus was able to reacquire WWWX in 2017.
