= WTCX =

- Ripon, Wisconsin; United States
- Broadcast area: Fond du Lac, Wisconsin
- Frequency: 96.1 MHz
- Branding: 95.1 & 96.1 The Rock

Programming
- Format: Mainstream rock
- Affiliations: CBS Radio Network, Westwood One, Premiere Radio Networks

Ownership
- Owner: Radio Plus, Inc.
- Sister stations: WFDL, WFDL-FM, WMDC

History
- First air date: February 1, 1965 (as WCWC-FM at 95.9)
- Former call signs: WCWC-FM (1965–1980); WYUR (1980–1994)
- Former frequencies: 95.9 MHz (1965–1989)

Technical information
- Licensing authority: FCC
- Facility ID: 54510
- Class: A
- ERP: 4,000 watts
- HAAT: 123 meters (404 ft)
- Translator: 95.1 W236AG (Fond du Lac)

Links
- Public license information: Public file; LMS
- Webcast: Listen Live
- Website: 961tcx.com

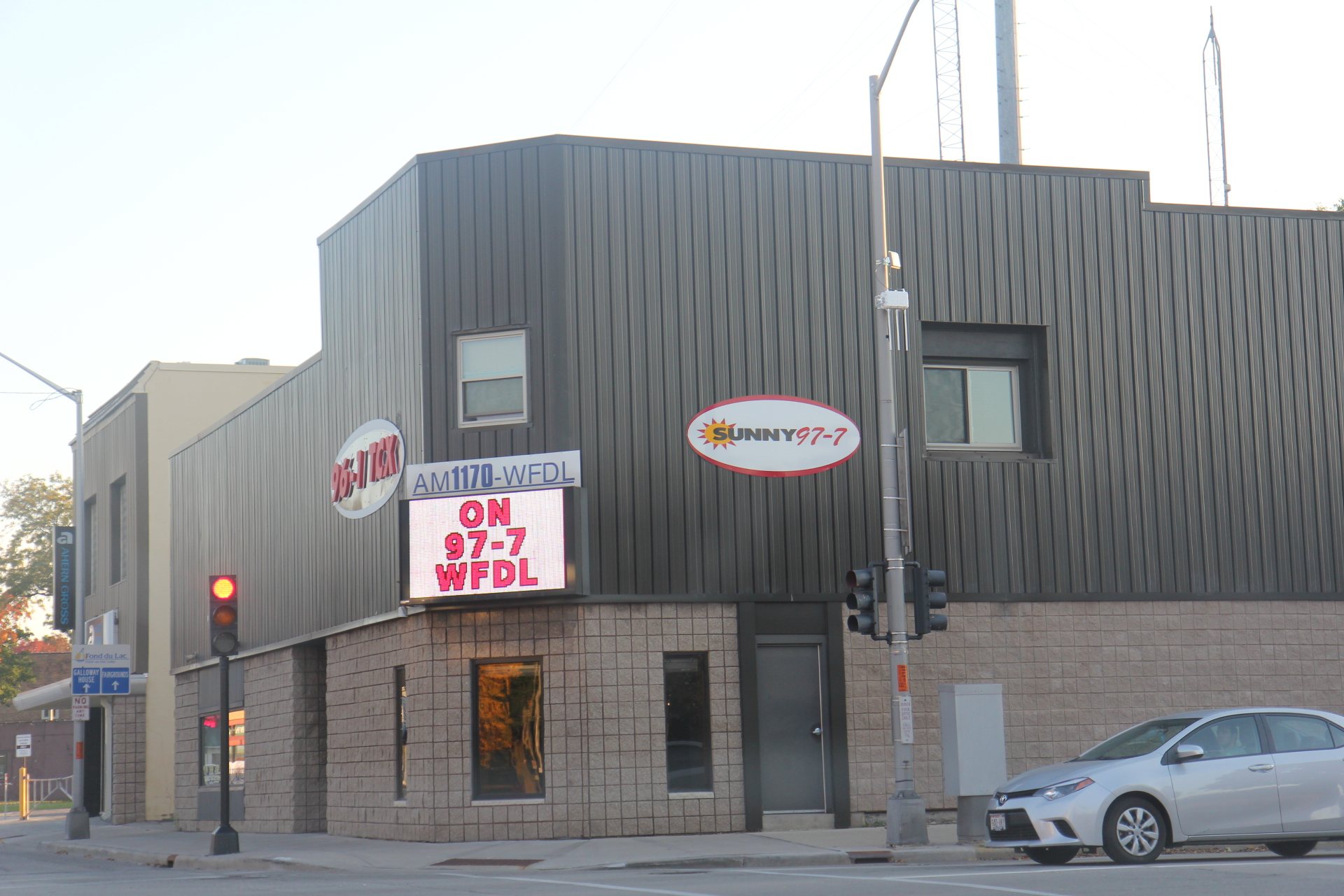
Studios in Fond du Lac

WTCX (96.1 FM, "95.1 & 96.1 The Rock") is a radio station broadcasting a mainstream rock music format. Licensed to Ripon, Wisconsin, United States, the station is currently owned by Radio Plus, Inc. and features programming from CBS Radio Network, Westwood One, and Premiere Radio Networks.

WTCX was originally on 95.9 MHz. before moving to 96.1, and was co-owned with AM 1600, WCWC (now WRPN) with studios in Ripon, Wisconsin.

== Other radio stations ==
From 1958 to 1972, WTCX was the call sign for a radio station in the Tampa Bay area. It was renamed as WQYK-FM in 1972.
