= WOGB =

Coordinates: 44.359°N 87.985°W

- Reedsville, Wisconsin; United States
- Broadcast area: Green Bay, Wisconsin
- Frequency: 103.1 MHz
- Branding: 103.1 WOGB

Programming
- Format: Classic hits

Ownership
- Owner: Cumulus Media Inc.; (Cumulus Licensing LLC)
- Sister stations: WDUZ (AM/FM), WKRU, WPKR, WQLH

History
- First air date: 1996
- Call sign meaning: Oldies in Green Bay

Technical information
- Licensing authority: FCC
- Facility ID: 89
- Class: C3
- ERP: 3,600 watts
- HAAT: 268 meters (879 ft)

Links
- Public license information: Public file; LMS
- Webcast: Listen live; Listen live; Listen live (via iHeartRadio)
- Website: wogb.fm

WOGB (103.1 FM) is a classic hits radio station licensed to Reedsville, Wisconsin, and serving Northeast Wisconsin. WOGB's studios are located on Victoria Street in Green Bay, while its transmitter is located near Shirley in the Town of Glenmore.

The station launched in the mid-1990s and initially featured music mostly from Rock and Roll's formative years. By 2008, WOGB had transitioned to a Classic Hits genre, featuring primarily hit songs from the 1970s and 1980s. WOGB is owned by Cumulus Media.

WOGB is very active in community activities throughout Northeast Wisconsin. It helps a variety of charities with fundraising efforts, including The Red Cross, The American Heart Association, the Breast Cancer Family Foundation, Paul's Pantry, the Brown County Volunteer Center and a variety of other public interest groups and charities. Since 2012, WOGB has been directly involved promoting the City of Green Bay's annual "Kid's Day" activities, held every June 25.

The station's current on-air lineup includes Rachel Williams (6 am-9 am), Jimmy Clark (9 am-2 pm), Scott Stevens (2 pm-7 pm), and Tom Kent (7 pm- Midday). WOGB has received several awards and other recognitions, including a Finalist award as one of the three best Green Bay radio stations in the 2011, 2013 and 2017 "Best of the Bay" Awards, as voted by readers of a local newspaper. In 2012 the Wisconsin Broadcasters Association awarded WOGB a first place award in the Best Specialty Category for its annual Christmas program, "WOGB's 36 Hours of Christmas."
