= WHBY =

News/talk radio station in Kimberly, Wisconsin, United States

- Kimberly, Wisconsin; United States
- Broadcast area: Green Bay - Oshkosh - Appleton - Fox Cities
- Frequency: 1150 kHz

Programming
- Format: Talk radio
- Network: ABC News Radio
- Affiliations: Compass Media Networks; Premiere Networks; Westwood One; Marquette Golden Eagles; Milwaukee Brewers Radio Network; Milwaukee Bucks Radio Network; Wisconsin Badgers; Wisconsin Herd

Ownership
- Owner: Woodward Communications, Inc.
- Sister stations: WAPL; WFZZ; WKSZ; WKZY; WSCO; WZOR

History
- First air date: April 5, 1925
- Former frequencies: 1200 kHz (1925–1941); 1230 kHz (1941–1991)
- Call sign meaning: Sequentially assigned, inspired slogan "Where Happy Boys Yodel"

Technical information
- Licensing authority: FCC
- Facility ID: 73660
- Class: B
- Power: 20,000 watts day; 25,000 watts night; 83 watts (day and night on auxiliary backup)
- Transmitter coordinates: 44°8′19.9″N 88°32′46.4″W; 44°15′37″N 88°22′0.4″W (aux)
- Translators: 103.5 W278AU (Appleton); 106.3 W292FA (Oshkosh); 106.3 W292DR (Wrightstown)

Links
- Public license information: Public file; LMS
- Webcast: Listen live
- Website: www.whby.com

WHBY (1150 AM) is a commercial radio station licensed to Kimberly, Wisconsin, that serves the Green Bay and Appleton-Oshkosh areas. The station is owned by Woodward Communications and it airs a news/talk radio format. WHBY's studios and microwave transmitter are located on East College Avenue in Appleton.

By day, WHBY is powered at 20,000 watts. At night, the power increases to 25,000 watts. WHBY uses a directional antenna with a six-tower array to protect other stations on 1150 AM from interference. The transmitter is in Neenah, on Wisconsin Highway 76. Programming is also heard on FM translators in Appleton, Oshkosh and Wrightstown.

== Programming ==
On weekdays, WHBY has local news and talk shows in morning and afternoon drive time, and part of middays. The rest of the schedule is made up of nationally syndicated programs: The Ramsey Show with Dave Ramsey, Our American Stories with Lee Habeeb, Ground Zero with Clyde Lewis, Coast to Coast AM with George Noory and This Morning, America's First News with Gordon Deal. Most hours begin with an update from CBS Radio News.

Specialty shows are heard on weekends, focusing on health, money, the outdoors, home repair, cars, movies and travel, along with repeats of weekday programs. Weekend shows include The Tech Guy with Leo Laporte, Ron Ananian The Car Doctor, Travel with Rudy Maxa and classic radio shows on Saturday evenings. Sports broadcasts include Westwood One NFL and NCAA broadcasts, Milwaukee Brewers baseball and University of Wisconsin–Madison Badgers football and basketball as well as local high school sports. They also previously hosted games played by the Oshkosh All-Stars back when they played in the National Basketball League as well.

== History ==
=== Early years ===
The station was initially licensed to St. Norbert College in De Pere, Wisconsin on 1200 kHz. The call letters, WHBY, were randomly assigned from a sequential list. Its sign-on the air on April 5, 1925 featured two test programs: a morning sermon, and evening musical entertainment. Regular weekly programming began on April 8. WHBY's license allowed it to broadcast at all hours.

Following the establishment of the Federal Radio Commission (FRC), stations were initially issued a series of temporary authorizations starting on May 3, 1927. In addition, they were informed that if they wanted to continue operating, they needed to file a formal license application by January 15, 1928, as the first step in determining whether they met the new "public interest, convenience, or necessity" standard. On May 25, 1928, the FRC issued General Order 32, which notified 164 stations, including WHBY, that "From an examination of your application for future license it does not find that public interest, convenience, or necessity would be served by granting it." However, the station successfully convinced the commission that it should remain licensed.

WHBY stayed at 1200 kHz after the implementation of General Order 40 in 1928, designated as a local station, with 100 watts of power. In the 1930s, WHBY was authorized to broadcast at 250 watts by day, 100 watts at night. Its studios were in the Berlin Building in Green Bay. It moved to 1230 kHz with the implementation of the North American Regional Broadcasting Agreement (NARBA) on March 29, 1941.

In 1975, Woodward Communications acquired WHBY. The station added more talk, sports and news programming, while reducing music shows.

=== Move to 1150 kHz ===
On September 16, 1991, the staff of both WHBY and WYNE (AM 1150) were informed that Woodward Communications, parent of WHBY, would be purchasing WYNE from Fox Valley Broadcasting, Inc. for a price of $965,000. The purchase would allow WHBY to move from 1230 kHz, and to increase its broadcast power from 1,000 to 5,000 watts, using WYNE's existing transmission equipment. The sale allowed WHBY to join WNAM as the only other Fox Valley AM station broadcasting with 5,000 watts of power at that time.

The purchase was approved by the FCC as part of a larger initiative to reduce the number of AM radio stations competing for signal strength. The cutover (which moved WHBY to 1150 kHz and ended the existence of WYNE) occurred at 7:45 a.m. on December 19, 1991.

AM 1150 is a Regional broadcast frequency.

=== AM transmitter and FM translators ===
In 2004, WHBY applied to build a new six-tower site on what was then U.S. Route 45 (and today is Wisconsin Highway 76) in the Town of Vinland. The new antenna array allowed the station to increase its power further, to 20,000 watts (daytime) and 25,000 watts (nighttime).

Previous logo

In November 2016, WHBY added its first FM translator, W278AU, serving Appleton on 103.5 MHz. In November 2017, two more translators were added, both at 106.3 MHz: W292FA serving Oshkosh and W292DR serving Wrightstown and southern sections of Brown County.
