= WNAM =

Coordinates: 44°06′01″N 88°32′02″W

Currently silent
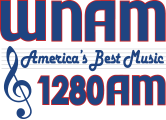
- Neenah-Menasha, Wisconsin; United States
- Broadcast area: Appleton-Oshkosh
- Frequency: 1280 kHz
- Branding: 1280 WNAM

Programming
- Format: Soft oldies; adult standards
- Affiliations: America's Best Music; ABC News Radio

Ownership
- Owner: Cumulus Media; (Cumulus Licensing LLC)
- Sister stations: WOSH; WPKR; WVBO; WWWX

History
- First air date: May 23, 1947
- Call sign meaning: "Neenah and Menasha"

Technical information
- Licensing authority: FCC
- Facility ID: 50053
- Class: B
- Power: 5,000 watts

Links
- Public license information: Public file; LMS
- Webcast: Listen live; Listen live (via iHeartRadio)
- Website: www.1280wnam.com

WNAM (1280 AM) is a commercial radio station licensed to Neenah-Menasha, Wisconsin, that serves the Appleton-Oshkosh radio market. The station is owned by Cumulus Media. Since December 31, 2025, the station is silent.

WNAM formerly used the "America's Best Music" radio format supplied by co-owned Westwood One, that combines soft oldies with a few adult standards and middle of the road songs each hour. The station also carried Wisconsin Timber Rattlers baseball. Most hours began with ABC News Radio.

== History ==
The station signed on the air on May 23, 1947, with 1,000 watts of power. WNAM was owned by Neenah-Menasha Broadcasting Company, with studios on Wisconsin Avenue in Neenah. The station was originally a daytimer, required to go off the air at night, when radio waves travel farther. In the 1960s, the station got authorization from the Federal Communications Commission (FCC) to broadcast at night at 1,000 watts, with its daytime power raised to 5,000 watts.

Ron Ross began working at WNAM in 1973 as afternoon host and eventually became program director when WNAM was a Top 40 radio station. In 1976, Ross was named by Billboard one of the country's top five Top 40 personalities for markets with fewer than 1 million people. During his time at WNAM, the station achieved a 17.6 Arbitron rating.

In the 1990s Value Radio Corp., owner of WOSH, purchased WNAM and WUSW in Oshkosh, Wisconsin, from Odon Communications Group.

Cumulus Broadcasting already owned WNAM, WOSH, WVBO and WWWX when the company bought WPKR and WPCK from Midwest Dimensions Inc. in an $8.1 million deal announced July 2, 2003.

"Mad Dog and Merrill" joined WNAM in 2008 for a cooking-related show airing weekdays from 10 to noon.

In 2008, WNAM began carrying Wisconsin Timber Rattlers baseball games. The station's contract was extended through 2021.

On December 17, 2025 the station announced that after 78 years, it would cease broadcasting at midnight on December 31. The station cited changing listener habits and economics as a reason it was signing off, with Cumulus taking silent a number of stations, mainly AM stations without inner-city translators, throughout 2025.

The station signed off the air at midnight on January 1, 2026, with a special event that would celebrate the station’s history in separate 3-hour blocks on New Years Eve. The last song played was "We've Got Tonite" by Bob Seger & The Silver Bullet Band. With the sign-off, Wisconsin Timber Rattlers games would move to sister station WOSH.
