= WVBO =

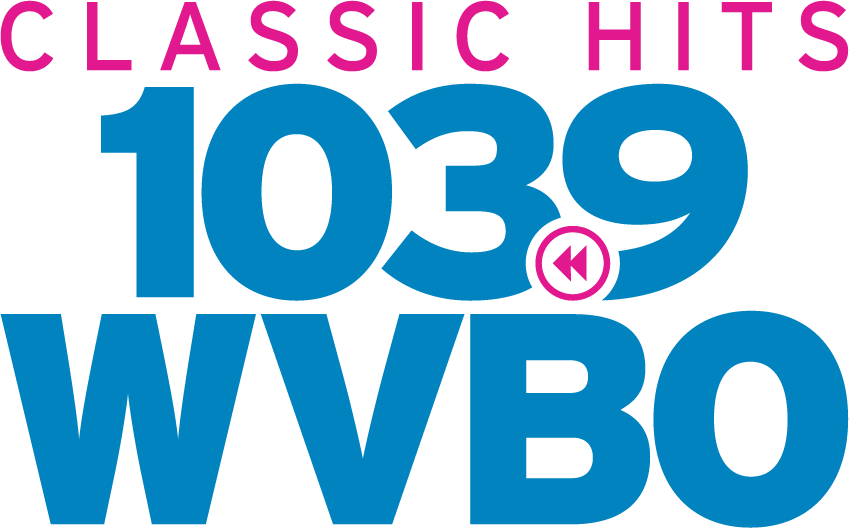
- Winneconne, Wisconsin; United States
- Broadcast area: Appleton-Oshkosh
- Frequency: 103.9 MHz
- Branding: Classic Hits 103.9 WVBO

Programming
- Format: Classic hits

Ownership
- Owner: Cumulus Media; (Cumulus Licensing LLC)
- Sister stations: WNAM, WOSH, WPKR, WWWX

History
- First air date: 1966 (as WOSH-FM)
- Former call signs: WOSH-FM (1966–early 1970s) WYTL-FM (early 1970s–1975); WOSH-FM (1975–1984) WMGV (1984–1994)
- Call sign meaning: W Valley's Best Oldies (former branding)

Technical information
- Licensing authority: FCC
- Facility ID: 69781
- Class: C3
- ERP: 25,000 watts
- HAAT: 100 meters (330 ft)
- Transmitter coordinates: 44°08′23″N 88°29′02″W

Links
- Public license information: Public file; LMS
- Webcast: Listen live; Listen live; Listen live (via iHeartRadio)
- Website: www.1039wvbo.com

WVBO (103.9 FM) is a classic hits formatted radio station licensed to Winneconne, Wisconsin, that serves the Appleton-Oshkosh area. The station is owned by Cumulus Media.

== History ==
This station began broadcasting in the fall of 1966 as WOSH-FM from studios at 2333 Bowen Street, Oshkosh. Its first format included a range from musical comedy, show tunes, Broadway music, and "semi-classical" music. Early in the 1970s, WOSH-FM changed its call letters to WYTL, and adopted a modern country format. This was maintained until August 1, 1975, at which time 103.9 FM regained the WOSH callsign and changed format to top 40/contemporary hits. Effectively this was advertised as a "frequency swap" to listeners, where WYTL-FM "moved" along with its country format to AM 1490, and WOSH-AM "moved" to FM 103.9 with its top 40 format.

On October 1, 1984, WOSH changed its call letters to WMGV, and at approximately the same time, increased its transmitting power. At this time it began branding itself as "Magic 104".

At 10 a.m. on April 30, 1994, WMGV began stunting as "Louie 103.9", with a format of "All Louie, All the Time", playing 21 different versions of the song "Louie Louie" made popular by The Kingsmen. Stunting continued until 7 a.m. May 3, 1994, at which time the station changed formats and its callsign to WVBO, as the "Valley's Best Oldies".

In 2001, WVBO and sister stations 96.9 The Fox WWWX, 99.5 Nash FM, NewsTalk 1490 WOSH and 1280 WNAM, moved from the Bowen Street facility to Washburn Street, next to Interstate 41.

The former station mascot was named Louie the Cool Cat.

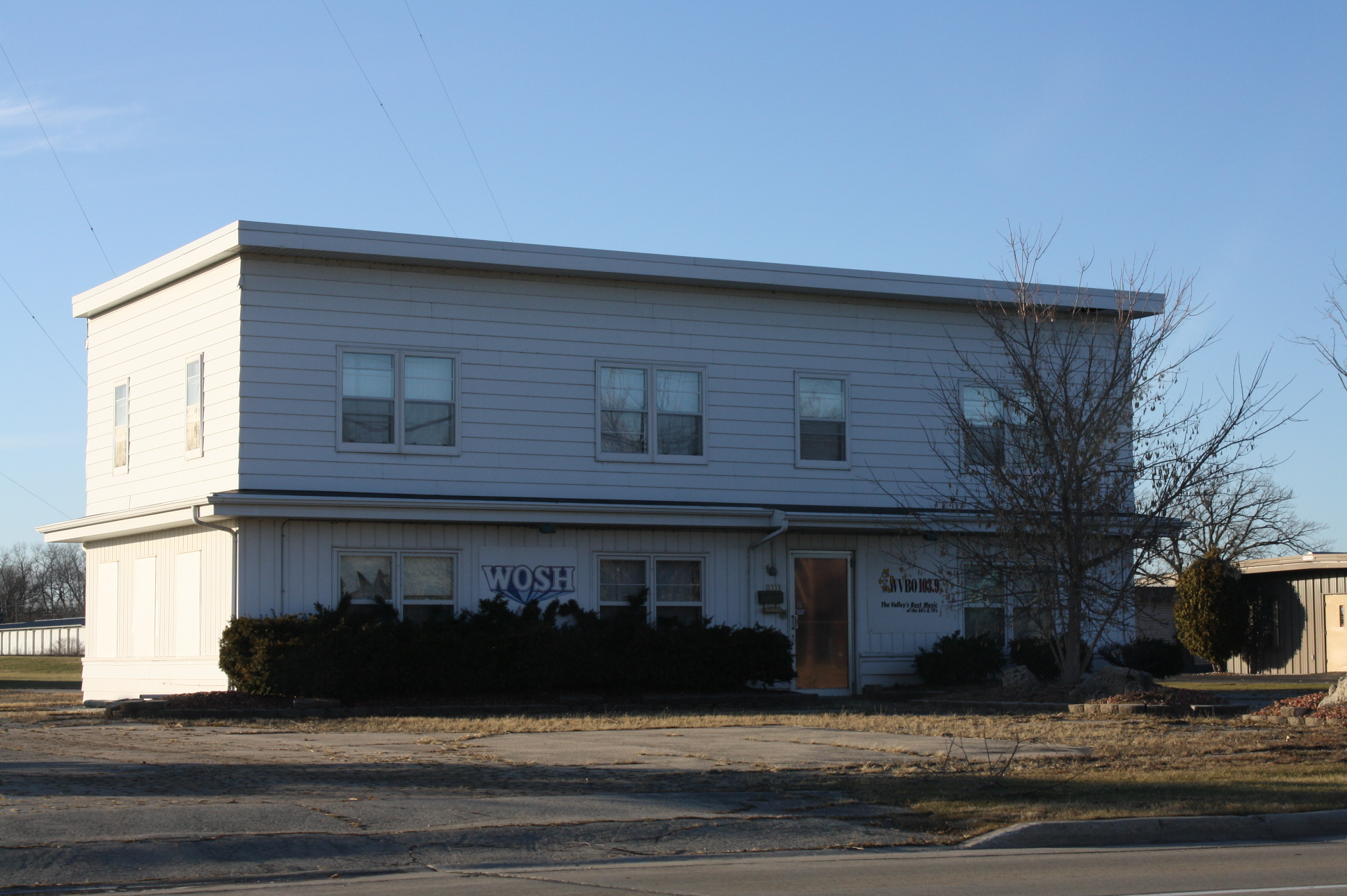
Former WVBO/WOSH building on Bowen Street
