= WKZY =

Simulcasts WKSZ De Pere
- Chilton, Wisconsin; United States
- Broadcast area: Appleton-Oshkosh and the Southern Fox River Valley of Wisconsin
- Frequency: 92.9 MHz
- Branding: 95.9 Kiss FM

Programming
- Format: Top 40 (CHR)
- Affiliations: Premiere Networks

Ownership
- Owner: Woodward Communications, Inc.
- Sister stations: WAPL, WFZZ, WHBY, WKSZ, WSCO, WZOR

History
- First air date: September 3, 2011 (as WXMM)
- Former call signs: WLWB (2010–2011, prior to launch); WXMM (2011–2013)
- Call sign meaning: "KZ" for the Fox Valley, as station formerly simulcast WKZG

Technical information
- Licensing authority: FCC
- Facility ID: 81813
- Class: A
- ERP: 6,000 watts
- HAAT: 94.5 meters (310 ft)
- Transmitter coordinates: 44°04′20″N 88°15′27″W

Links
- Public license information: Public file; LMS
- Webcast: Listen Live!
- Website: 959kissfm.com

WKZY (92.9 FM) is an American radio station, licensed to Chilton, Wisconsin, and transmitting from the Lake Winnebago community of Stockbridge to provide a city-grade signal to both Oshkosh and the Fox Cities. The station is owned and operated by Woodward Communications, and has simulcasted the Top 40/CHR format of sister station WKSZ since February 15, 2016. WKZY's studios are located on College Avenue in Appleton.

== Station history ==
In 1996, Metro North Communications, Inc., applied to the Federal Communications Commission (FCC) for a construction permit for a new broadcast radio station to serve New Holstein, Wisconsin. This application was renewed in 2010 and the FCC granted the requested permit on July 6, 2010, with a scheduled expiration date of July 6, 2013. The new station was assigned call sign "WLWB" on July 14, 2010.

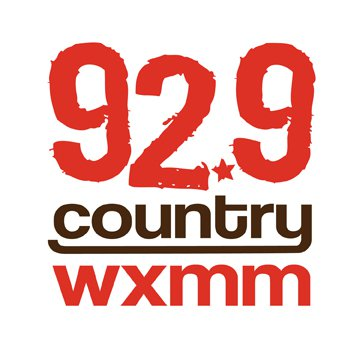
Logo for "92.9 Country" (2011–2013)

In November 2010, the Metro North applied to change the station's community of license to Chilton, Wisconsin, in preparation for a planned sale. In December 2010, Metro North Communications applied to transfer the station's construction permit to Woodward Communications, Inc., for reported sale price of $1.2 million. The FCC approved the transfer on February 9, 2011, and the transaction was formally consummated on April 4, 2011. The Commission granted the requested change in community of license on July 22, 2011. This followed a requested change to the under-construction station's call sign to "WXMM" on July 19, 2011. (The calls have since been re-used by Metro North's new acquisition, a station on 1530 from New Holstein.)

Woodward Communications had originally anticipated for WXMM to begin broadcasting in "mid-to-late August 2011." However, technical difficulties delayed the launch, and the station began airing on September 3, 2011, when the station debuted as "92.9 Country." As a country station, WXMM featured a contemporary presentation to the format, emphasizing on younger country acts and with an on-air style similar to Top 40-formatted stations. "92.9 Country" was home to the syndicated Bobby Bones Show in morning drive time.

On September 16, 2013, WXMM dropped country and, under the new call sign of WKZY, began a simulcast of its Seymour-licensed sister station WKZG, which as "KZ104.3" aired an adult hits format emphasizing songs and artists from the 1980s and 1990s. The move gave "KZ104.3" coverage of the Southern Fox Valley, an area where WKZG's 104.3 FM signal may be hard to reach. "KZ104.3's" schedule included the husband-and-wife local team of Doug Erickson and Mary Love in morning drive and the nationally syndicated Mario Lopez in evenings. The "KZ 104.3" name lasted just over four months, as WKZG and WKZY changed their name to "KZ Radio" in early 2014 to better reflect the simulcast.

On February 12, 2016, Woodward announced that WKZY would switch to a simulcast of sister WKSZ on February 15. Concurrently, morning hosts Doug and Mary would move back to WKSZ on the same day.

Logo (2016–2021)
