= WSCO =

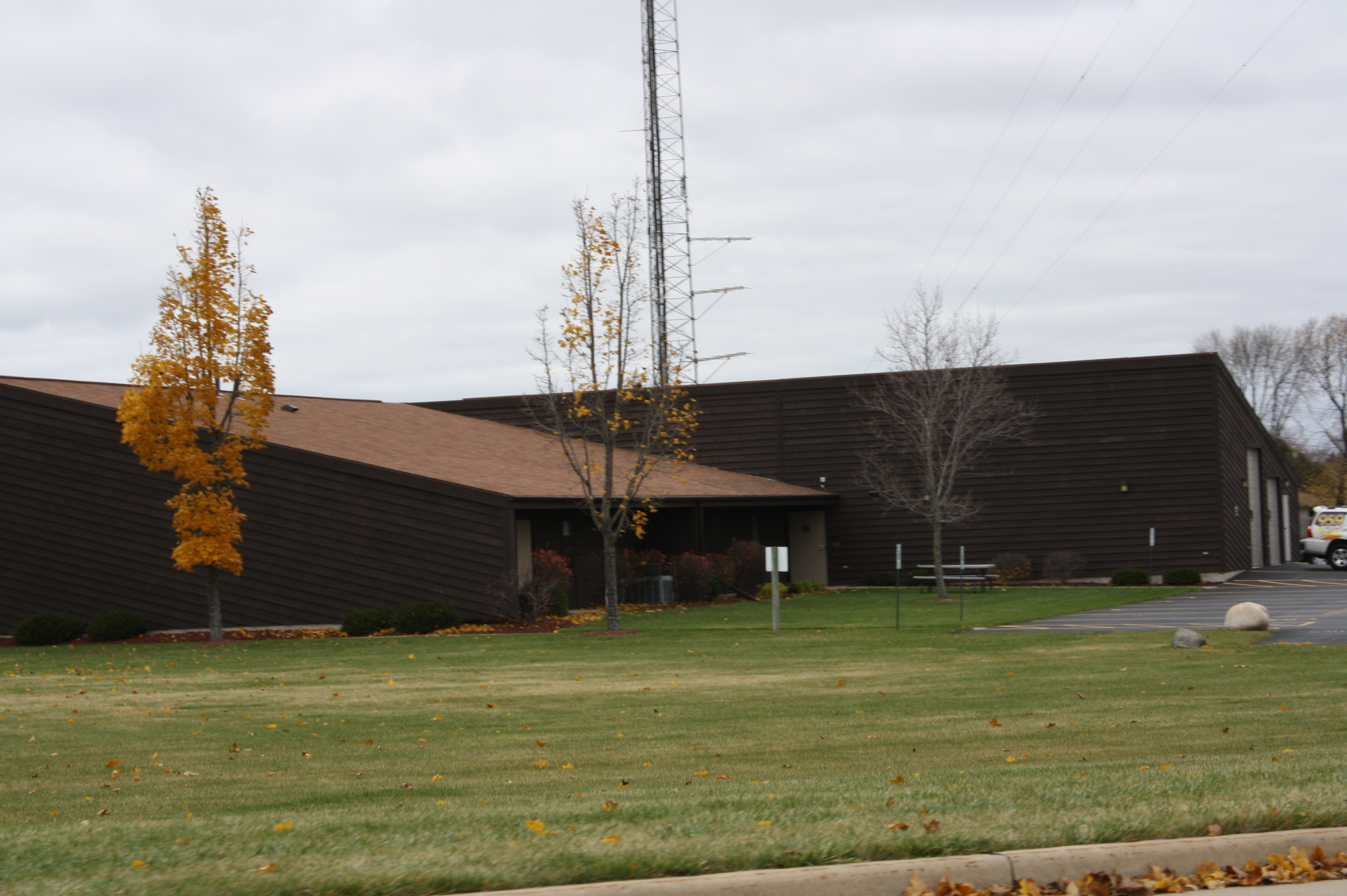
- Studios of WSCO and Woodward Communications
- Appleton, Wisconsin; United States
- Broadcast area: Appleton-Oshkosh
- Frequency: 1570 kHz
- Branding: AM 1570 The Score

Programming
- Format: Sports
- Affiliations: Fox Sports Radio; SportsMap; Motor Racing Network

Ownership
- Owner: Woodward Communications, Inc.
- Sister stations: WAPL; WFZZ; WHBY; WKSZ; WKZY; WZOR

History
- First air date: 1952 (as WAPL)
- Former call signs: WAPL (1952–1978); WVMS (1978–1985); WRJQ (1985–2002)
- Call sign meaning: "The Score" (alternately Wisconsin)

Technical information
- Licensing authority: FCC
- Facility ID: 72941
- Class: B
- Power: 1,000 watts day; 331 watts night
- Transmitter coordinates: 44°13′4″N 88°24′33″W
- Translators: 95.3 W237AA (Appleton); 99.1 W256DD (Oshkosh)

Links
- Public license information: Public file; LMS
- Webcast: Listen live
- Website: www.thescorewi.com

WSCO (1570 AM) is a radio station broadcasting a sports format. Licensed to Appleton, Wisconsin, the station serves the Appleton-Oshkosh area. The station is owned by Woodward Communications, Inc. and features local, state, and National Programming. WSCO is also heard on FM translators W237AA 95.3 MHz in Appleton and W256DD 99.1 MHz in Oshkosh. WSCO's studios are located on College Avenue in Appleton, while its AM transmitter is located in Menasha. WSCO serves as the local affiliate for several major Wisconsin sports entities, including the Milwaukee Bucks, Marquette Golden Eagles, and NASCAR.

== History ==
WSCO began broadcasting in 1952 as WAPL, founded by the Bartell family. It was the third AM station to enter the Appleton market but distinguished itself by being the first to target a younger audience with rock and roll music. In 1965, the station added an FM sister station, WAPL-FM (105.7), which shared its tower in Menasha. The AM signal eventually transitioned through various formats including easy listening and country before the call letters were changed to WVMS ("The Valley's Music Station") on October 4, 1978.

On September 1, 1985, the station was rebranded as WRJQ and adopted an all-polka and big band format. This format proved remarkably durable, lasting nearly 17 years. The station became a cultural fixture in the Fox Valley, specifically known for its "Goodtime Radio" branding and local polka remotes. In early 2002, Woodward Communications purchased the station and decided to flip the format to sports talk. The final song played during the WRJQ era was "Polka Medley #2" by Dick Rodgers, after which the station went dark for a month to prepare for its relaunch.

The final polka era was so beloved that a former employee, Aaron Schuelke, eventually launched an internet-only version of "WRJQ" to keep the station's memory and music alive for the local community.

The station returned to the air on January 31, 2002, as WSCO, branded as "AM 1570 The Score." Since its inception, the sports format has combined national syndicated content from Fox Sports Radio and SportsMap with significant local high school sports coverage. On October 4, 2021, the station's reach was expanded with the launch of FM translators in Appleton (95.3 FM) and Oshkosh (99.1 FM).
