= WMDC (FM) =

- Mayville, Wisconsin; United States
- Broadcast area: Mayville, Wisconsin
- Frequency: 98.7 MHz
- RDS: PI: 74A8; RT: The Great 98 WMDC
- Branding: 98.7 FM the Great 98

Programming
- Format: Classic hits

Ownership
- Owner: Radio Plus, Inc.
- Sister stations: WFDL, WFDL-FM, WTCX

History
- First air date: October 31, 1998
- Former call signs: WWRS (1986–1989); WMVW (1989–1990); WMVM (1990–1998)
- Call sign meaning: Mayville and Dodge County

Technical information
- Licensing authority: FCC
- Facility ID: 46698
- Class: A
- ERP: 6,000 watts
- HAAT: 100 meters (330 ft)

Links
- Public license information: Public file; LMS
- Webcast: Listen live
- Website: great98.net

WMDC (98.7 FM) is a radio station broadcasting a classic hits format, licensed to Mayville, Wisconsin, United States. The station is currently owned by Radio Plus, Inc.

== History ==
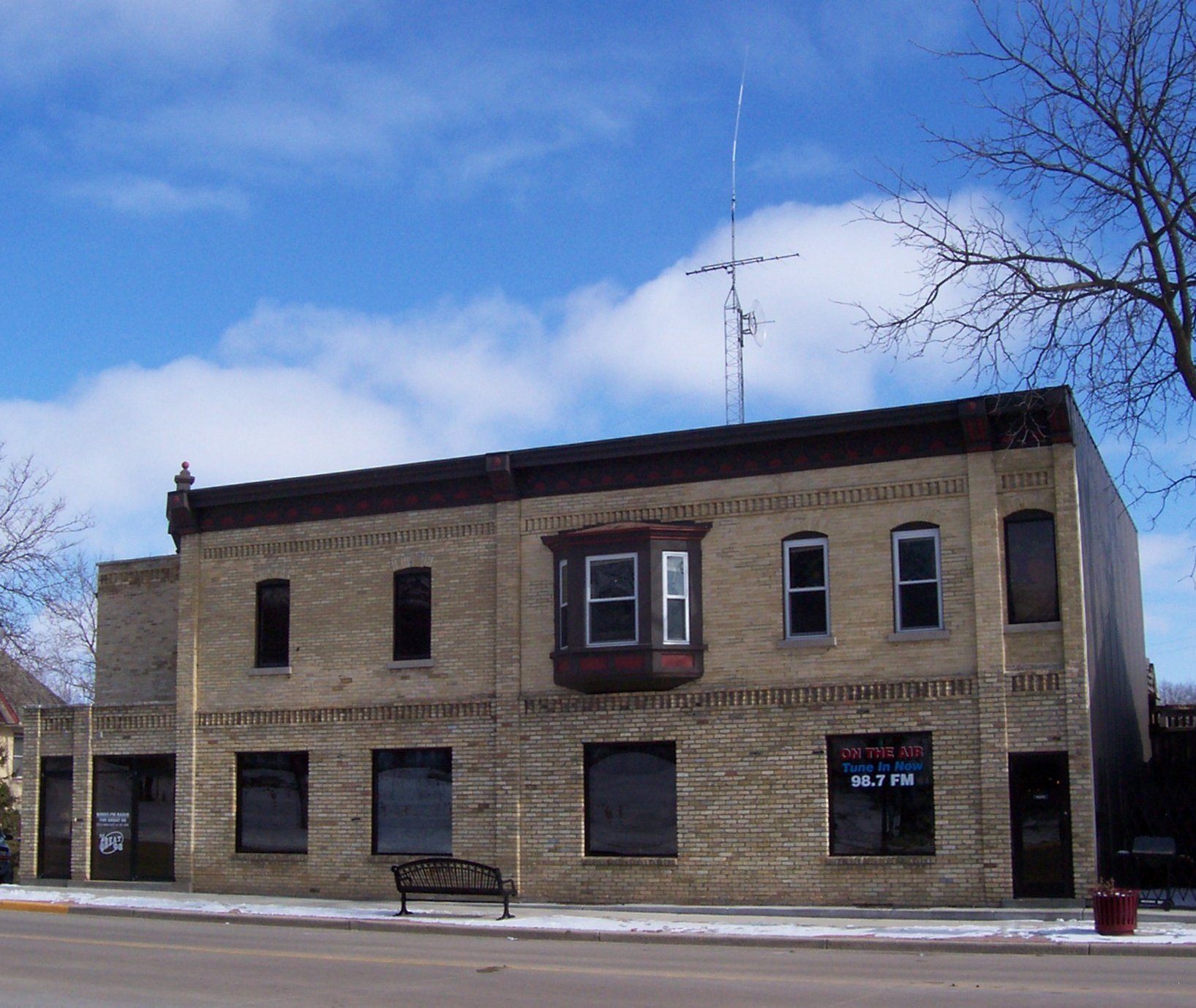

The station was originally assigned the call letters WWRS in 1986 and assigned to the frequency of AM 990, and later changed to WMVW on October 31, 1989. On March 3, 1990, the station changed its call sign to WMVM. On August 10, 1998, its call sign changed to the current WMDC.
