= WFDL-FM =

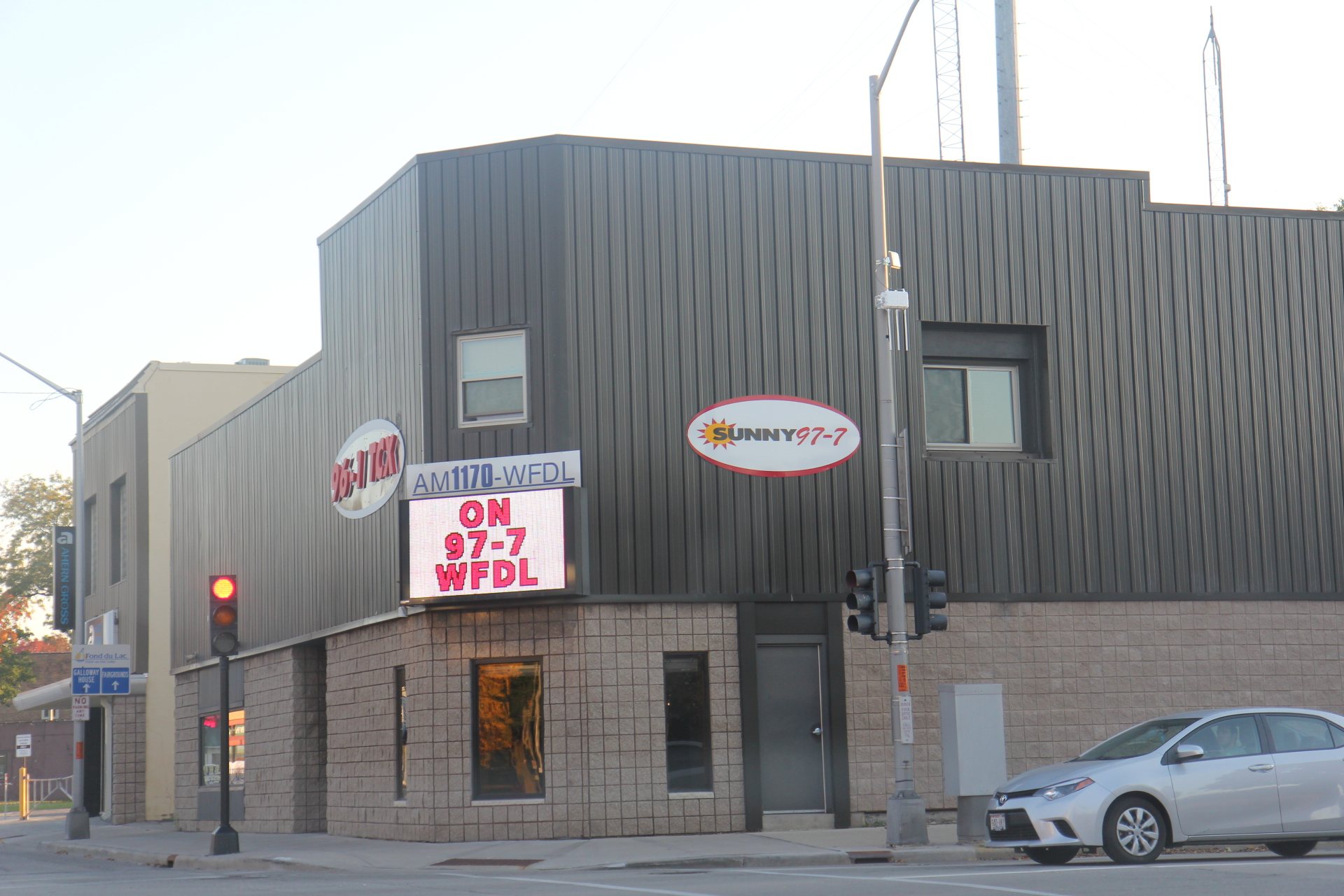
- WFDL-FM studios in Fond du Lac
- Lomira, Wisconsin; United States
- Broadcast area: Fond du Lac, Wisconsin
- Frequency: 97.7 MHz
- Branding: Sunny 97.7

Programming
- Format: Adult contemporary
- Affiliations: Westwood One

Ownership
- Owner: Terry Holzmann; (Radio Plus, Inc.)
- Sister stations: WFDL, WMDC, WTCX

History
- First air date: April 1993
- Former call signs: WFDL (1990–2002)
- Call sign meaning: Fond du Lac

Technical information
- Licensing authority: FCC
- Facility ID: 69779
- Class: C3
- ERP: 17,500 watts
- HAAT: 122 meters (400 ft)
- Transmitter coordinates: 43°39′14.00″N 88°26′25.00″W

Links
- Public license information: Public file; LMS
- Webcast: Listen live
- Website: sunny977.com

WFDL-FM (97.7 FM) is a commercial radio station broadcasting an adult contemporary format. Licensed to Lomira, Wisconsin, United States, the station serves the Fond du Lac area. The station is currently owned by Terry Holzmann, through licensee Radio Plus, Inc., and features programming from Westwood One.

== History ==
The station was assigned the call sign WFDL on June 26, 1990. On October 14, 2002, the station added the "-FM" suffix, concurrent with an AM sister station taking on the WFDL call sign.

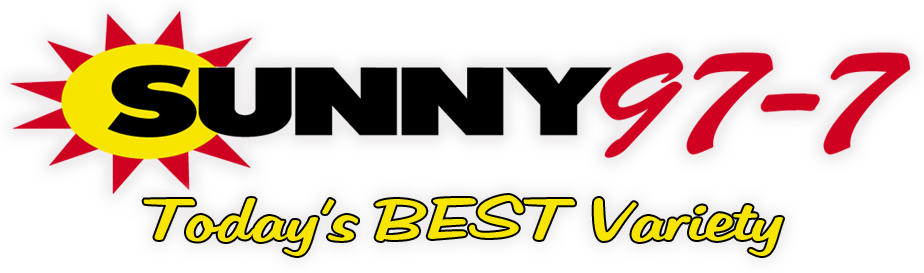
Previous logo
