= WFDL (AM) =

- Waupun, Wisconsin; United States
- Broadcast area: Fond du Lac and Dodge Counties
- Frequency: 1170 kHz
- Branding: The Source

Programming
- Format: Oldies
- Affiliations: ABC News Radio; Compass Media Networks; The True Oldies Channel

Ownership
- Owner: Radio Plus, Inc.
- Sister stations: WFDL-FM, WMDC, WTCX

History
- First air date: May 26, 1966
- Former call signs: WLKE (1966–1982); WGZS (1982–1984); WLKE (1984–1987); WLKD (1987–1990); WMRH (1990–2002)
- Call sign meaning: Fond du Lac

Technical information
- Licensing authority: FCC
- Facility ID: 42092
- Class: D
- Power: 1,000 watts (days only)
- Transmitter coordinates: 43°38′30.00″N 88°43′22.00″W
- Translators: 93.7 W229DE (Fond du Lac); 103.3 W277AC (Waupun)

Links
- Public license information: Public file; LMS
- Webcast: Listen Live
- Website: am1170radio.com

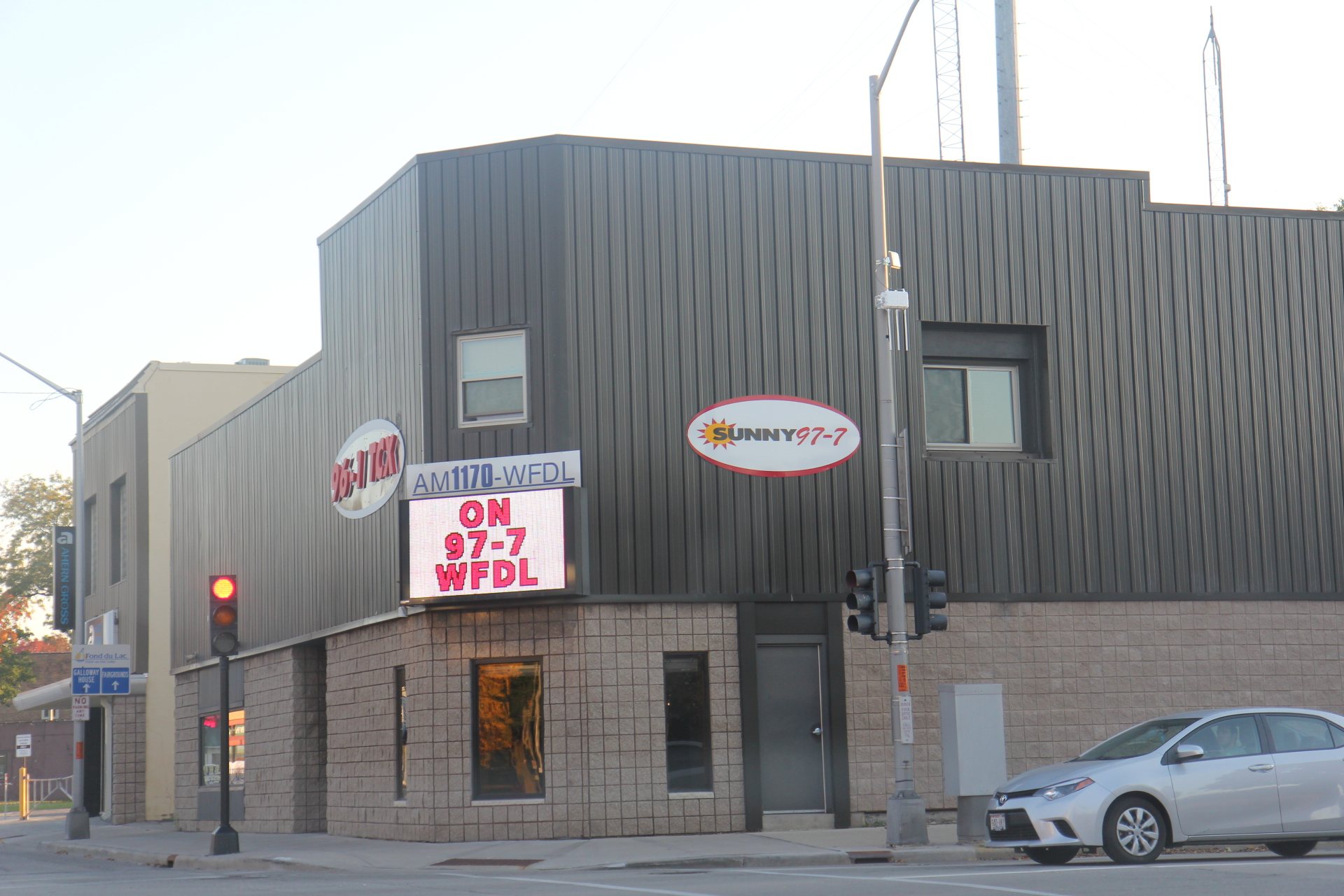
Studios in Fond du Lac

WFDL (1170 kHz) is an AM radio station broadcasting an oldies format. Licensed to Waupun, Wisconsin, United States, the station is owned by Radio Plus, Inc. and features programming from ABC News Radio and The True Oldies Channel.

== History ==
Originally 1170 was known as WLKE and played top-40 rock from 1966 to 1971. From 1971 to 1983, it broadcast country music and was known as "Lucky 1170". After an ownership change it briefly became WGZS, which featured a Christian format. The station was reassigned the call letters WLKE on January 9, 1984 and simulcast a country music format with WLKE-FM (99.3 FM). In 1985, the station flipped the format to a rock oldies format using the Satellite Music Network Pure Gold music format and was call "The Lake". On February 25, 1987, the station changed its call sign to WLKD, when the owner moved the WLKE calls to an AM station he owned in Oshkosh, Wisconsin, (690 kHz). 1170 WLKD retained "The Lake" branding and oldies format, and was simulcast on 690 WLKE. On July 12, 1990, calls changed to WMRH, "Marsh Area Radio" and played S.M.N.'s Stardust format. And on October 14, 2002, the call letters changed again to the current WFDL which aired ABC/Citadel's Timeless Favorites until that satellite format ended on February 15, 2010. On February 16, 2010, WFDL began airing "Hit Parade Radio" in certain day-parts.

From 1971 to July 1990, WLKE had an FM sister station at 99.3 FM; that station is now separately-owned WPKR on 99.5.

WFDL is licensed as a daytime-only station. The station added a translator on 103.3 FM in 2013, which is allowed to broadcast 24 hours a day. However the signal does not reach far outside of Waupun; to solve this issue, a second translator on 93.7 FM signed on in late August 2018.

On November 19, 2019, the station rebranded as "The Source", and began carrying The True Oldies Channel in time periods not occupied by local programming.
