= WOSH =

Coordinates: 44°02′45″N 88°31′45″W

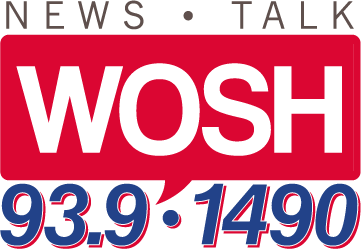
- Oshkosh, Wisconsin; United States
- Broadcast area: Appleton-Oshkosh
- Frequency: 1490 kHz
- Branding: WOSH NewsTalk 93.9 & 1490

Programming
- Format: News/talk
- Affiliations: ABC News Radio; Fox News Radio; Radio America; Westwood One

Ownership
- Owner: Cumulus Media; (Cumulus Licensing LLC)
- Sister stations: WNAM, WPKR, WVBO, WWWX

History
- First air date: 1941
- Former call signs: WOSH (1941–1975); WYTL (1975–1984)
- Call sign meaning: Oshkosh

Technical information
- Licensing authority: FCC
- Facility ID: 69780
- Class: C
- Power: 1,000 watts
- Translator: 93.9 W230DB (Oshkosh)

Links
- Public license information: Public file; LMS
- Webcast: Listen live
- Website: 1490wosh.com

WOSH (1490 AM) is a radio station serving the Oshkosh, Wisconsin area with a news/talk format including the ABC News Radio network. This station is under ownership of Cumulus Media. The station currently features "The WOSH Morning Show," which has been hosted by local personalities such as Phil Cianciola.

== History ==
WOSH first began broadcasting on December 31, 1941, operating as a 250-watt station on 1490 kHz. The station's original transmitter and a 180-foot broadcast tower were located in a block building on Bowen Street, while early broadcasts originated from the Oshkosh Theater. By the mid-1940s, the station had become a primary affiliate of the NBC Blue Network, carrying popular "Golden Age" dramas and comedies. In the early 1950s, the station's owners briefly expanded into television with the launch of WOSH-TV (channel 48). WOSH-TV was the first UHF station in Wisconsin and the third television station of any kind in the state, though it ultimately ceased operations in 1954 due to the lack of UHF-capable receivers in the market. Following the TV closure, WOSH AM pivoted its focus back to radio, notably securing the local broadcast rights for the Green Bay Packers and Milwaukee Braves in 1954. During the late 1960s and early 1970s, WOSH was the dominant Top 40 station in the Oshkosh-Appleton market. This era was notable for launching the career of disc jockey Jonathon Brandmeier, who served as the station's star personality before moving to larger markets.

On August 1, 1975, a unique marketing move occurred known as a "frequency swap." The WOSH call letters and Top 40 format were moved to its FM sister station (103.9 FM), while the 1490 AM frequency adopted the call sign WYTL and a modern country format.

In 1984, the WOSH call letters returned to the 1490 AM frequency, and the station transitioned to its current news/talk format. In 2001, WOSH moved its studios from its longtime home on Bowen Street to a new facility on South Washburn Street, which it shares with several other Cumulus Media stations.

On October 4, 2021, Cumulus Media expanded the station's reach by launching a simulcast on FM translator W230DB (93.9 FM).

Starting in the 2026 season, WOSH (along with its FM translator 93.9) will become the primary home for Wisconsin Timber Rattlers baseball broadcasts following the closure of sister station WNAM.

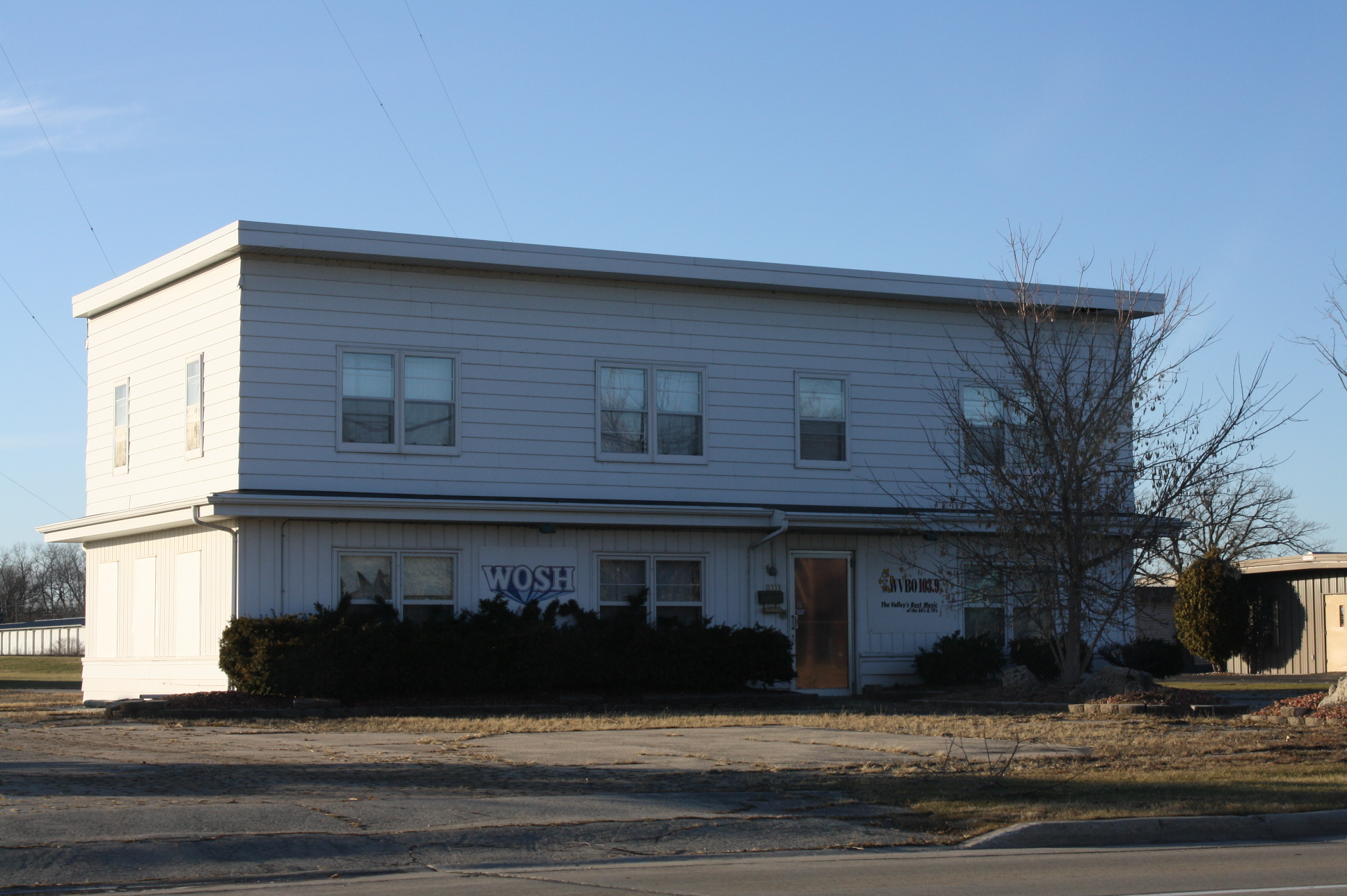
Former WOSH & WVBO Studios

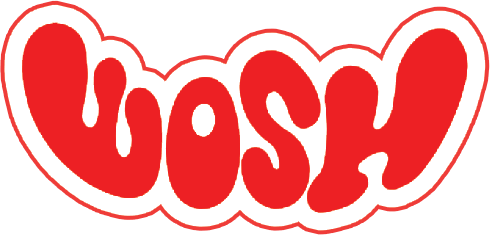
WOSH logo from 1975
