= WPKR =

Coordinates: 43.829°N 88.668°W

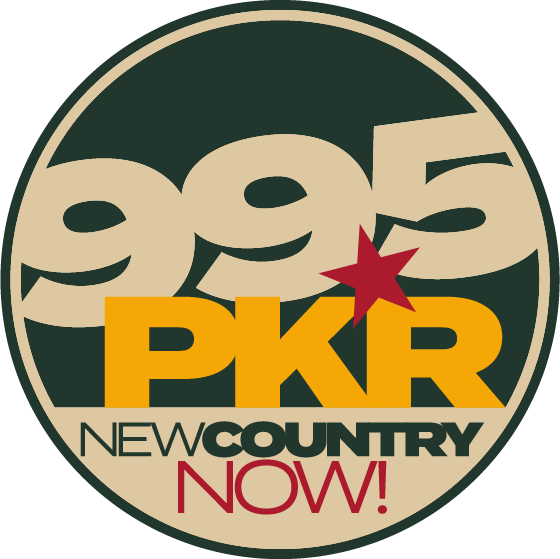
- Omro, Wisconsin; United States
- Broadcast area: Oshkosh-Fond du Lac
- Frequency: 99.5 MHz
- Branding: 99.5 PKR

Programming
- Format: Country
- Affiliations: Westwood One

Ownership
- Owner: Cumulus Media; (Cumulus Licensing LLC)
- Sister stations: WNAM, WOSH, WVBO, WWWX

History
- First air date: 1971 (as WLKE-FM at 99.3)
- Former call signs: WLKE-FM (1971–1975 & 1980–1984); WGGQ (1975–1980 & 1984–1990)
- Former frequencies: 99.3 MHz (1971–1990)
- Call sign meaning: PacKeR Country (former branding)

Technical information
- Licensing authority: FCC
- Facility ID: 42093
- Class: C2
- ERP: 25,000 watts
- HAAT: 151 meters (495 ft)

Links
- Public license information: Public file; LMS
- Webcast: Listen live
- Website: 995pkr.com

WPKR (99.5 FM, "99.5 PKR") is a country music radio station licensed to Omro, Wisconsin, that serves the Oshkosh, Appleton and Fond du Lac areas. The station is owned by Cumulus Media. WPKR's studios are located on Washburn Street in Oshkosh (with an auxiliary studio on Victoria Street in Green Bay), while its transmitter is near Rosendale.

== History ==
From 1971 to July 1990, WLKE 1170 kHz (now WFDL) had an FM sister station at 99.3 FM, first known as WLKE-FM, which broadcast an in-house beautiful music format from 1971 to 1976. Then later the call letters were changed to WGGQ ("99Q"). 99Q was an automated station and played Drake-Chenault's top-40 rock format "XT-40" using reel to reel tapes from 1976 to 1981. The call letters were changed back to WLKE-FM from August 1981 to May 1984, and an automated country music was aired. Then, in May 1984, the WGGQ call letters were brought back and "99Q" was once again back on the air using Satellite Music Network's All Hit Radio format (later renamed "The Heat") until July 1990, when the station flipped to country as "Packer Country".

The AM and FM then had separate ownership after July 1990, with WGGQ moving to 99.5 MHz and changing its city of license from Waupun to Ripon and later to Omro.

In 1997, an ownership change saw the station's programming being simulcasted on WPCK (104.9 MHz), a station serving the Green Bay area and licensed to Denmark, with both stations utilizing the "Packer Country" branding. Both stations would eventually be acquired by Cumulus Media, who would break off the simulcast in November 2003, with WPCK keeping a country format but adopting its own identity, "Kicks 104.9." WPCK would again be under common ownership with WPKR in 2013 after Clear Channel Communications, which acquired WPCK and four other Green Bay area Cumulus stations in 2009, sold its Green Bay stations back to Cumulus. (Under Clear Channel ownership, Cumulus continued to operate the five stations that Clear Channel acquired, including WPCK.)

In June 2011, WPKR would reunite with WPCK in a simulcast, branded as "99.5 and 104.9 The Wolf," incorporating new and existing elements from both stations. The "Wolf" branding would give way on May 24, 2013, to the new branding of "Nash FM, 99.5 and 104.9;" WPCK and WPKR were two of six Cumulus country stations to adopt the "Nash FM" branding that day, part of Cumulus' plan to nationally expand its multimedia "Nash FM" country branding, which was launched earlier in 2013 at its New York City station, WNSH. Cumulus Media filed for bankruptcy protection in early 2018.

On March 27, 2018, WPCK and three other Cumulus stations (WTOD/Toledo, OH, KJMO/Jefferson City, MO, and WNUQ/Albany, GA) were placed into the Cumulus Reorganization Divestiture Trust for a future sale. Shortly after this, the simulcast between WPCK and WPKR was broken. While both stations retained the country format and "Nash FM" branding, the stations began airing separate programming and separate airstaffs.

Following the sale of WPCK to Educational Media Foundation in October 2019, WPCK switched over to their K-LOVE network just before midnight on December 31, 2019, following a farewell message advising listeners to turn to WPKR.

On April 5, 2021, WPKR dropped the "Nash FM" branding and rebranded as "99.5 PKR".

== Previous logo ==
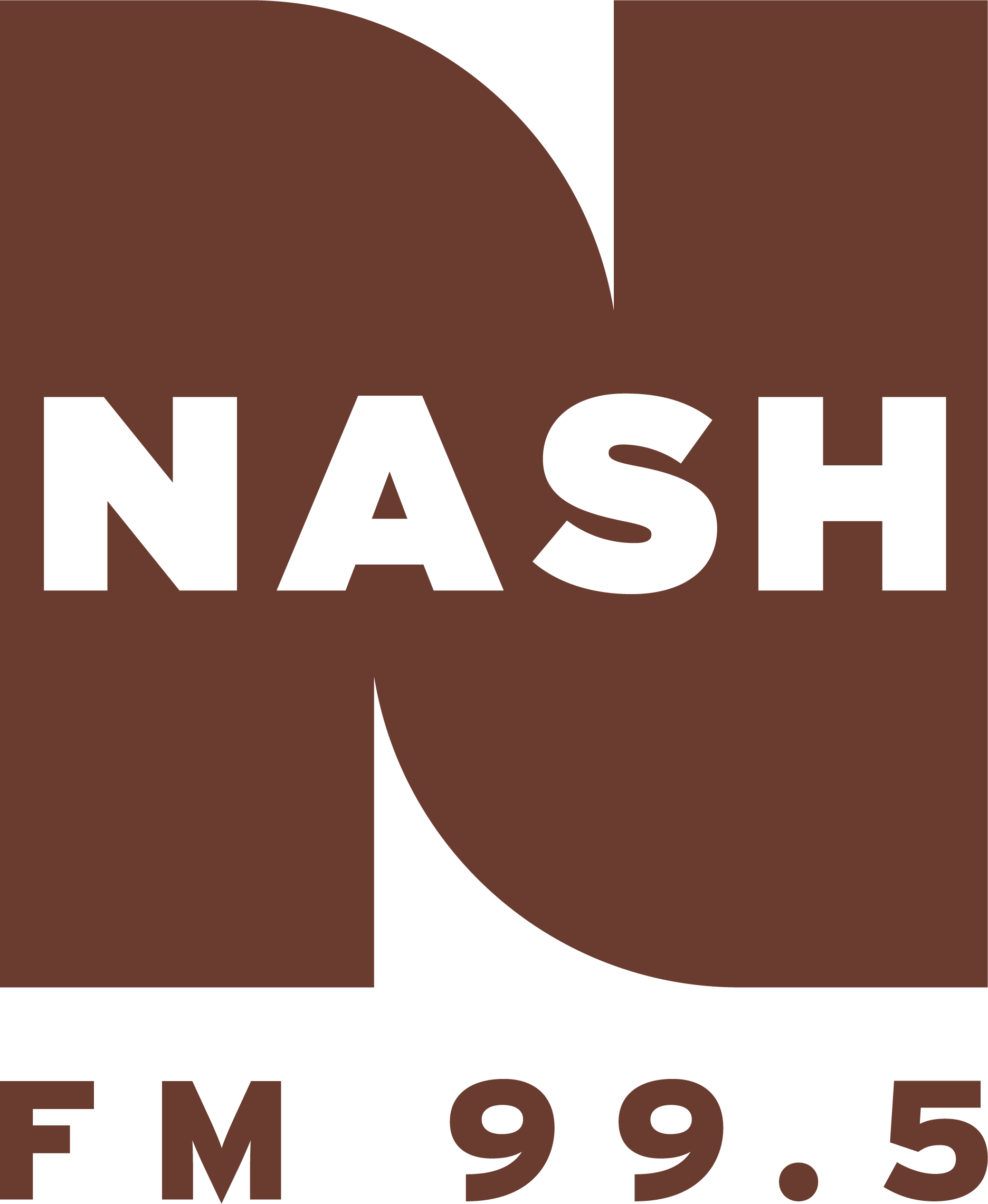
