= WKRU =

- Allouez, Wisconsin; United States
- Broadcast area: Green Bay, Wisconsin
- Frequency: 106.7 MHz
- Branding: 106.7 The Big Dog

Programming
- Format: Classic rock
- Affiliations: Westwood One

Ownership
- Owner: Cumulus Media; (Cumulus Licensing LLC)
- Sister stations: WDUZ(AM/FM), WOGB, WQLH

History
- First air date: December 1996 (as WJLW)
- Former call signs: WJLW (1996–2007); WZNN (2007–2010)
- Call sign meaning: Derived from the station's former "KRUz" format

Technical information
- Licensing authority: FCC
- Facility ID: 31912
- Class: C3
- ERP: 25,000 watts
- HAAT: 100 meters (328 feet)
- Transmitter coordinates: 44°29′03″N 87°56′12″W

Links
- Public license information: Public file; LMS
- Webcast: Listen live
- Website: www.bigdog1067.com

WKRU (106.7 FM) is a classic rock radio station licensed to Allouez, Wisconsin, United States and serving the Green Bay area. The station is owned by Cumulus Media. WKRU's studios are located on Victoria Street in Green Bay. while its transmitter is located in the eastern part of Green Bay.

== History ==
The station began broadcasts in December 1996, when Jack LeDuc resurrected the WJLW call letters and its country music format one year after selling its previous home at 95.9 FM. LeDuc ran WJLW until March 1998, when he decided to sell a second time. The new owners, Cumulus Media, changed the station to "106.7 The Eagle," airing a classic rock format. By the mid 2000s, some current rock songs would be inserted into the format, with the station billing themselves as "The Rock of Green Bay."

Major changes would occur at the station in March 2007, as Cumulus changed the call letters to WZNN and dismissed the on-air staff. "The Eagle" ended on the night of March 5 when, after an hour of music from The Eagles (ending with "Hotel California"), the station began stunting with construction site noise. At precisely 1:06 p.m. the next day, WZNN relaunched as "106-7 The Zone," with Nirvana's "Smells Like Teen Spirit" and Green Day's "Holiday" being the first two songs played. In billing themselves as "Green Bay's only true alternative", WZNN's move was aimed to set the station apart from the traditional mainstream/classic rock stations in the area. "The Zone" would also air the syndicated Mancow's Morning Madhouse program during morning drive time.

On December 9, 2010, WZNN changed its call sign to WKRU, rebranded as "KRUZ @ 106.7," and adopted a new adult album alternative format. The format of "KRUZ" (pronounced on-air as "cruise") was similar to that of stations in Madison (WMMM-FM) and Chicago (WXRT-FM).

At midnight on November 17, 2017, after playing "It's the End of the World as We Know It" by R.E.M., WKRU began stunting with Christmas music as "Christmas @ 106.7." The holiday music lasted until 6 p.m. on December 25, when classic rock returned to the frequency, this time under the "106.7 The Big Dog" branding, with "Move it On Over" by George Thorogood and the Destroyers being the first song played (which was preceded by The Singing Dogs' version of "Jingle Bells," a hint of the new format's branding). "The Big Dog's" on-air schedule features The Bob & Tom Show in morning drive; Bob & Tom, which is distributed by Cumulus-owned Westwood One, had aired in Green Bay on the rock-formatted WOZZ/WRQE (93.5 FM) before that station's 2014 flip to classic country as WGEE.

== Previous logo ==
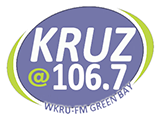
