= WKSZ =

- De Pere, Wisconsin; United States
- Broadcast area: Green Bay, Wisconsin
- Frequency: 95.9 MHz
- Branding: 95.9 Kiss FM

Programming
- Language: English
- Format: Contemporary hit radio
- Affiliations: Premiere Networks

Ownership
- Owner: Woodward Communications, Inc.
- Sister stations: WAPL; WFZZ; WHBY; WKZY; WSCO; WZOR

History
- First air date: 1984
- Former call signs: WJLW (1983–1995)
- Call sign meaning: (sounds like "Kiss")

Technical information
- Licensing authority: FCC
- Facility ID: 1518
- Class: C3
- ERP: 4,500 watts
- HAAT: 236 meters (774 ft)
- Transmitter coordinates: 44°21′32″N 87°59′07″W
- Repeater: 92.9 WKZY (Chilton)

Links
- Public license information: Public file; LMS
- Webcast: Listen Live
- Website: www.959kissfm.com

WKSZ (95.9 FM, "Kiss FM") is a contemporary hit radio station licensed to De Pere, Wisconsin, serving Green Bay and Appleton-Oshkosh and owned by Woodward Communications. WKSZ's studios are located on College Avenue in Appleton, while its transmitter is located near Shirley in the Town of Glenmore.

== History ==
The history of the 95.9 MHz frequency in the Green Bay area dates back to the mid-1980s, with the station signing on as WJLW on September 29, 1984. Locally owned by Jack LeDuc (from whom the "JL" of the call letters originated), WJLW broadcast a country music format until October 1995, when LeDuc sold the station to Woodward Communications. (LeDuc would resurrect the WJLW call letters, and its country format, one year later at the 106.7 frequency in Green Bay).

The 95.9 frequency went dormant for a month until November 13, 1995, when Woodward launched WKSZ as "95.9 Kiss FM". The station was positioned as a contemporary hit radio, putting it in direct competition with Midwest Communications' heritage Top 40/CHR, WIXX.

The original airstaff included Keith Kelly in mornings, Bob Masters in middays, Program Director Miles Ryker in afternoons, and Ace Adams in evenings.

Kiss FM's ratings managed to hold steady in the middle of the Arbitron ratings for the Green Bay market, thanks to the long-time dominance of WIXX as the premier hit radio station in Northeast Wisconsin. However, a ratings surge by WKSZ in 2001–2002 had the station beating WIXX in several key younger demographics. In response, Midwest Communications changed the format of their low-rated adult contemporary station, WLTM, to a rhythmic contemporary format as WLYD, "Wild 99.7"," and WIXX gravitated to a modern rock-leaning Top 40/CHR format.

On April 18, 2003, after a stellar first book performance by "Wild", Woodward pulled the plug on "95.9 Kiss FM". A local research project commissioned by Woodward indicated a format "hole" for hot adult contemporary, and after a weekend of stunting with Christmas music, Woodward launched the new format on WKSZ as "Today's Best Variety, Mix 95.9" on April 21. The first (and ultimately, last) song on "Mix" was "Why Georgia" by John Mayer. The move to hot AC, however, backfired for Woodward, as WKSZ's listener share sank to at or near the bottom of the Arbitron ratings in the Green Bay market.

In February 2006, Midwest Communications dropped WLYD's rhythmic format in favor of adult hits (as WZBY). One month later, on March 13, at 10 a.m., Woodward would fill the void "Wild 99.7" left behind, flipping WKSZ from hot AC back to "Kiss FM", mixing Kiss' contemporary hit music with some rhythmic music formerly heard on "Wild". The first song on the revived "Kiss" was "In Da Club" by 50 Cent; by coincidence, it was also the last song on the first incarnation of "Kiss". (Reviving the "Kiss FM" moniker was an acknowledgment that listeners still referred to WKSZ by that name, even during its "Mix" days.) A noticeable addition to "Kiss-FM" after its return was the "tagging" of each song (artist and song title) at its conclusion, regardless of whether a DJ will be heard afterwards (this would later be discontinued).

The 2006 return of “Kiss” paid off, for in the first Arbitron ratings book after the flip (spring 2006), WKSZ leaped to a fourth-place ranking (of 21 stations) with an audience share that was five times greater than the share "Mix 95.9" pulled in during its waning days. The station finished second place in the fall 2010 Arbitron ratings for the Green Bay market.

On February 15, 2016, WKSZ started simulcasting on sister station WKZY (92.9 FM), which formerly repeated sister station WKZG. The move was done to expand WKSZ's reach to the Fox Valley, as well as southern areas of the market. In addition, Doug Erickson and Mary Love, who were WKSZ's morning hosts from November 2004 until December 2012 (when they moved to WKZG upon that station's launch), returned to host mornings on WKSZ. They remained until September 2017, when they were let go and replaced with former WIXX personalities Jake Kelly and Tanner Jay, who returned to Green Bay after two years at WKTI-FM in Milwaukee. In November 2023, Jake and Tanner were let go, and were replaced by Otis Day, formerly of WIXX. In January 2024, Woodward announced that Katie Schurk and Nick Vitrano, also formerly of WIXX, would join as co-hosts following the expiration of their non-compete clauses in June. On April 9, 2026, Otis Day was let go, Co-hosts Katie Schurk and Nick Vitrano stayed on the morning show. The station named Eddie as the interim morning host. On Sept. 1, 2026, The station named Eddie as the permanent morning host.

On September 3, 2021, WKSZ debuted a new logo.

Former logo (2016–2021)

The WKSZ call letters were first used in the Philadelphia market at 100.3 FM (now WRNB) before being relocated to WJLW in 1995.
