= Local marketing agreement =

Contract to share radio or television operations

In North American broadcasting, a local marketing agreement (LMA), or local management agreement, is a contract in which one company agrees to operate a radio or television station owned by another party. In essence, it is a sort of lease or time-buy.

Under Federal Communications Commission (FCC) regulations, a local marketing agreement must give the company operating the station (the "senior" partner) under the agreement control over the entire facilities of the station, including the finances, personnel and programming of the station. Its original licensee (the "junior" partner) still remains legally responsible for the station and its operations, such as compliance with relevant regulations regarding content. Occasionally, a "local marketing agreement" may refer to the sharing or contracting of only certain functions, in particular advertising sales. This may also be referred to as a time brokerage agreement (TBA), local sales agreement (LSA), management services agreement (MSA), or most commonly, a joint sales agreement (JSA) or shared services agreement (SSA). JSAs are counted toward ownership caps for television and radio stations. In Canada, local marketing agreements between domestic stations require the consent of the Canadian Radio-television and Telecommunications Commission (CRTC), although affiliates of Rogers Sports & Media and My Broadcasting Corporation have used a similar arrangement to control a U.S.-based radio station in a border market.

The increased use of sharing agreements by media companies to form consolidated, "virtual" duopolies became controversial between 2009 and 2014, especially arrangements where a company buys a television station's facilities and assets, but sells the license to an affiliated third-party "shell" corporation, which then enters into agreements with the owner of the facilities to operate the station on their behalf. Activists have argued that broadcasters use these agreements as a loophole for the FCC's ownership regulations, that they reduce the number of local media outlets in a market through the aggregation or outright consolidation of news programming, and allow station owners to have increased leverage in the negotiation of retransmission consent with local subscription television providers. Station owners have contended that these sharing agreements allow streamlined, cost-effective operations that may be beneficial to the continued operation of lower-rated and/or financially weaker stations, especially in smaller markets.

In 2014 under chairman Tom Wheeler, the FCC began to increase its scrutiny regarding the use of such agreements—particularly joint sales—to evade its policies. On March 31, 2014, the commission voted to make joint sales agreements count as ownership if the senior partner sells 15% or more of advertising time for its partner, and to ban coordinated retransmission consent negotiations between two of the top four stations in a market. Wheeler indicated that he planned to address local marketing and shared services agreements in the future. The change in stance also prompted changes to then-proposed acquisitions by Nexstar Media Group and Sinclair Broadcast Group, who, rather than using sharing agreements to control them, moved their existing programming and network affiliations to digital subchannels of existing company-owned stations in the market, or a low-power station (which were not subject to ownership caps), and then relinquished control over the original stations by selling their licenses to third-parties, such as minority-owned broadcasters.

== History and background ==
Due to the Federal Communications Commission (FCC)'s limits on station ownership at the time (which prevented the common ownership of multiple radio stations), local marketing agreements in radio, in which a smaller station would sell its entire airtime to a third-party in time-buy, were widespread between the 1970s and early 1990s. These alliances gave larger broadcasters a way to expand their reach, and smaller broadcasters a means of obtaining a stable stream of revenue. In 1992, the FCC began allowing broadcasting companies to own multiple radio stations in a single market. Following these changes, local marketing agreements largely fell out of favor for radio, as it was now possible for broadcasters to simply buy another station outright rather than lease it – consequentially triggering a wave of mass consolidation in the radio industry. However, broadcasters still used local marketing agreements to help transition acquired stations to their new owners.

The first local marketing agreement in North American television was formed in 1991, when the Sinclair Broadcast Group purchased Fox affiliate WPGH-TV in Pittsburgh, Pennsylvania. As Sinclair had already owned independent station WPTT (now WPNT) in that market, which would have violated FCC rules which at the time had prohibited television station duopolies, Sinclair decided to sell the lower-rated WPTT to the station's manager Eddie Edwards, but continued to operate the station through an LMA (Sinclair eventually repurchased the station—then assigned the call letters WCWB—outright in 2000, after the FCC began permitting common ownership of two television stations in the same market, creating a legal duopoly).

Sinclair's use of local marketing agreements would lead to legal issues in 1999, when Glencairn, Ltd. (now Cunningham Broadcasting) announced that it would acquire Fox affiliate KOKH-TV in Oklahoma City, Oklahoma from Sullivan Broadcasting; Glencairn subsequently announced plans to sell five of its 11 existing stations that were operated by Sinclair under LMAs to that company outright. As the family of Sinclair Broadcast Group founder Julian Smith controlled 97% of Glencairn's stock assets (which remains the case under its Cunningham structure) and the company was to be paid with Sinclair stock in turn for the purchases, KOKH and Sinclair-owned WB affiliate KOCB would effectively constitute a duopoly in violation of FCC rules. The Rainbow/PUSH coalition (headed by Jesse Jackson) filed challenges against the sale with the FCC, citing concerns over a single company holding two broadcast licenses in a single market and argued that Glencairn was masquerading as a separate minority-owned company (Edwards, who served as Glencairn's president, is African American) when it was really an arm of Sinclair that the company used to gain control of the stations through LMAs. After the FCC updated its media ownership rules to allow a single company to own two television stations in the same market in August 1999, Sinclair restructured the deal to acquire KOKH outright. In 2001, the FCC issued a $40,000 fine against Sinclair for illegally controlling Glencairn.

In 1999, the FCC modified its media ownership rules to count LMAs formed after November 5, 1996 that covered more than 15% of the broadcast day toward the ownership limits for the brokering station's owner. Even still, the related joint sales and shared services agreement structures became increasingly common during the 2000s; these outsourcing agreements proliferated between 2011 and 2013, when station owners such as Sinclair and Nexstar Broadcasting Group began expanding their portfolios by acquiring additional stations in an effort to drive scale as well as to gain leverage in retransmission consent negotiations with cable and satellite television providers.

== Uses ==
=== Consolidation ===
The most common use of an LMA in television broadcasting is to create a "virtual duopoly", where the stations operated under the agreement are consolidated into a single entity. The operations of the stations can be streamlined for cost-effectiveness through the sharing of resources, such as facilities, advertising sales, personnel and programming. Many broadcasters that engage in the practice believe that such agreements are beneficial to the survival of television stations—especially in smaller markets, where the overall audience reach is considerably less than that of markets that are centered upon densely populated metropolitan areas, and the cost savings achieved through the consolidation of resources and staff may be necessary to fund a station's continued operation.

Sharing agreements have also been used as a loophole to control television stations in situations where it was legally impossible to own them outright. For instance, FCC regulations only allowed a single company to own more than one full-powered television station in a given market if there were at least eight distinct station owners, and also prohibited the ownership of two or more of the four highest-rated stations (based on total day viewership) in a market. An LMA or similar agreement does not affect the ownership of the station's license, meaning that they do not require the approval of the FCC to establish, and the two stations are still legally considered separate operations from a licensing standpoint. Both Tribune Media and the Gannett Company were required to use shared services agreements as a similar loophole to take control of certain stations in their respective 2013 purchases of Local TV and Belo, as they did not have exemptions to the FCC's newspaper cross-ownership restrictions in the affected markets. Both companies have since spun off their publishing arms as independent companies; the Tribune Publishing Company and Gannett Company. Tegna, which held the former Gannett's broadcasting and digital media properties, re-acquired the licenses for most of the affected stations following the split. On November 16, 2017, under the Trump administration, the FCC voted in favor of removing the requirement for a market to still have eight distinct station owners in order to allow duopolies, but the prohibition of owning two of the top four stations in a market remained. In 2025, the "top four" rule was struck down by Zimmer Radio of Mid-Missouri v. FCC.

Broadcasters could also collect carriage fees for the stations they operate under sharing agreements on behalf of their owner, often bundling its carriage agreements with those of stations they own outright. This could, especially in LMAs between two stations affiliated with the "major" networks, allow the broadcaster to charge higher fees for retransmission consent to television providers for carrying the stations, which could result in smaller cable companies not being able to afford the higher fees imposed. Cable television providers advocated barring sharing agreements between television stations for this particular reason. In the United States, the FCC no longer allows broadcasters to collude with one another in negotiating retransmission consent fees.

=== Operation on behalf of a third-party owner ===
Although the majority of LMAs involve the outsourcing of one television station's operations to another, occasionally, a company may operate a station under an LMA, JSA or SSA even if it does not already own a station in that market. One example occurred in December 2013, when the Louisiana Media Company (owned by New Orleans Saints and New Orleans Hornets owner Tom Benson) entered into a shared services agreement with Raycom Media to run the former company's Fox affiliate in New Orleans, Louisiana, WVUE-DT; while Louisiana Media Company retained the station's ownership and license, other assets were assumed by Raycom, which owned stations in markets adjacent to New Orleans (including Baton Rouge, Jackson, Biloxi, Lake Charles and Shreveport) but not within New Orleans itself. Benson had received offers from Raycom and others to buy the station, but was not prepared to sell WVUE outright. In April 2017, Benson would ultimately sell the station to Raycom outright for $51.8 million.

=== Foreign control of broadcast outlets ===
LMAs can also allow companies to control foreign stations from outside of their respective country; Canadian media company Rogers Media used a joint sales agreement to operate Cape Vincent, New York radio station WLYK as a station targeting the nearby Canadian market of Kingston, Ontario, where it owns CKXC-FM and CIKR-FM. Rogers owned a 47% stake in WLYK's licensee, Border International Broadcasting. In 2022, the principal owners of My Broadcasting Corporation acquired Border International Broadcasting via 1234567 Corporation, and assumed operations in February 2023.

Similarly, Entravision Communications Corporation previously controlled XHDTV-TDT, a Tijuana, Mexico-based station owned by Televisora Alco, which formerly operated as an English-language station serving the border market of San Diego.

== Effects of LMAs ==
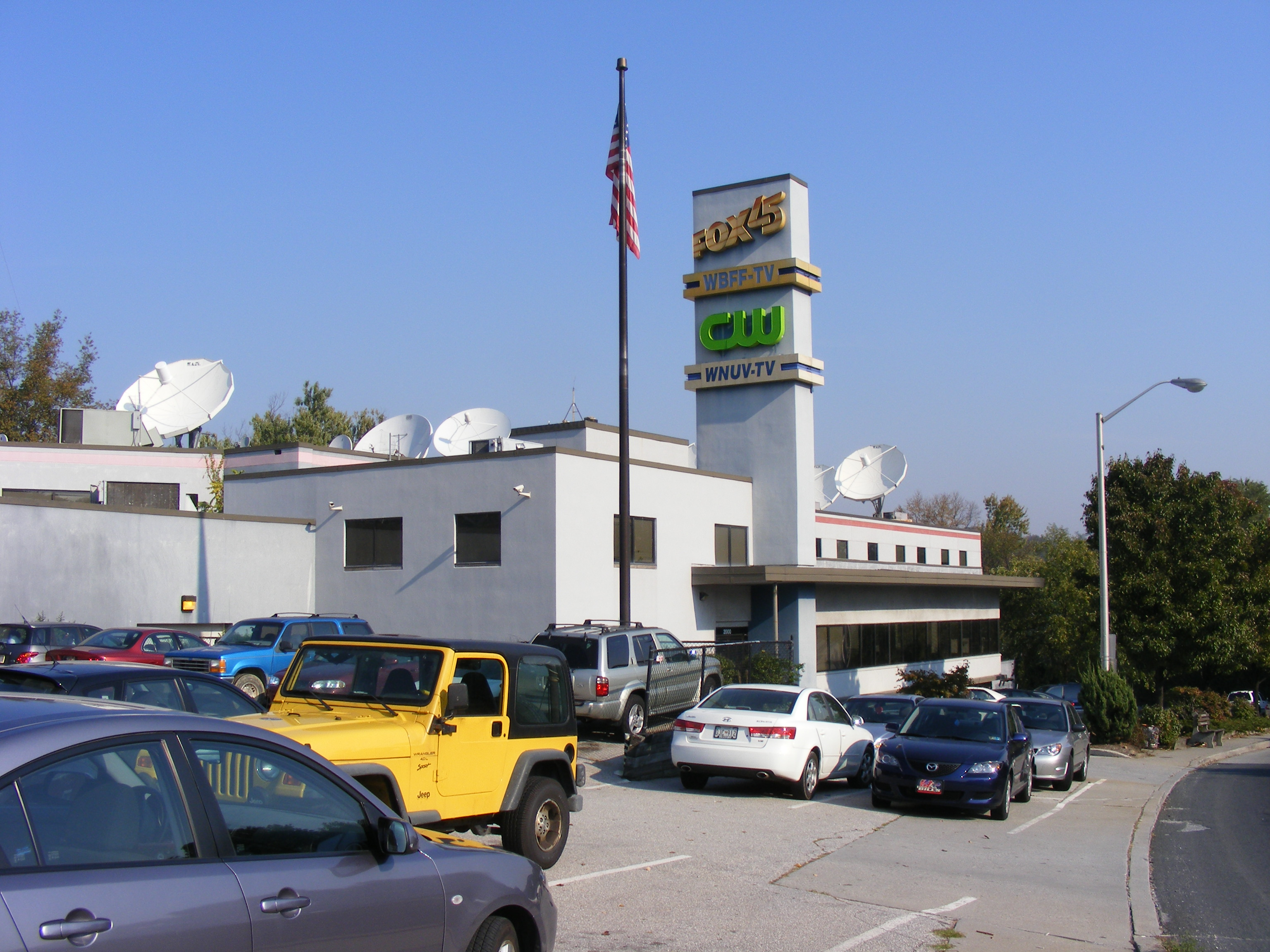
The studio facilities shared by WBFF and WNUV in Baltimore; WBFF owner Sinclair Broadcast Group operates WNUV, which is owned by Cunningham Broadcasting.

Public interest organizations have disapproved of the use of LMAs for virtual duopolies that circumvent the FCC's rules due to their effects on the broadcasting industry, particularly the results of consolidation through the irregular use of LMAs. In markets where duopolies are not legally possible, a company may elect to form one by purchasing a station's "non-license" assets (such as their physical facilities, programming rights, and other intellectual property), and selling the license itself to a third-party "sidecar" company (which is often affiliated with the purchaser), which in turn, enters into an LMA or a similar agreement with the senior partner. The FCC only recognizes ownership of television stations by the ownership of their license and facility ID, and not by the ownership of these "non-license" assets; this means that the senior partner becomes the de facto owner and operator of the station, but the sidecar is still the legal owner. Although the FCC determines a sidecar firm to be an independent entity from the company using it to outsource station operations for licensing purposes, the Securities and Exchange Commission does not make such a designation, requiring reports on sidecars to be included in a broadcaster's financial statements.

Both Sinclair and Nexstar became known for their frequent use of sidecars as part of their expansion and consolidation tactics, partnering with companies like Cunningham Broadcasting, Deerfield Media, Mission Broadcasting, and even each other in the case of former virtual duopolies in Rochester, New York between Nexstar-owned CBS affiliate WROC-TV and Sinclair-owned Fox affiliate WUHF (which ended in January 2014 after Newport Television sold the license and assets of ABC affiliate WHAM-TV to Deerfield and Sinclair, respectively). and Harrisburg, Pennsylvania between Sinclair-owned CBS affiliate WHP-TV and Nexstar-owned CW affiliate WLYH-TV (which ended in 2015 amid Sinclair's acquisition of Allbritton Communications, which saw WHTM-TV sold to Media General to avoid conflicts with WHP, and WLYH's license sold to Howard Stirk Holdings). While not to the same, wide extent as Sinclair and Nexstar, some broadcasters have similar business relationships with specific sidecar companies as partners for these agreements:

- Raycom Media had a similar business relationship with American Spirit Media in markets such as Toledo, Ohio (where American Spirit Media purchased Fox affiliate WUPW from LIN Media in 2012, with that station's operations being taken over by CBS affiliate WTOL), On the other hand, two Raycom-owned Fox stations, WFLX in West Palm Beach and KNIN-TV in Boise, were managed by Scripps' WPTV and KIVI-TV respectively.
- Gray Television is affiliated with the sidecar Excalibur Broadcasting – owned by former Gray executive Don Ray. Gray acquired Raycom Media in 2019, giving it control of the American Spirit Media stations. There were a few exceptions, including WUPV and KYOU-TV—which Raycom acquired outright in advance of the purchase, WUPW/Toledo—whose SSA was included in the sale of parent station WTOL to Tegna due to Gray's existing ownership of WTVG, and WFXG/Augusta—which was sold to Lockwood Broadcast Group due to Gray's existing WRDW-TV/WAGT-CD duopoly. Gray initially maintained its ownership of KNIN, but traded it to Marquee Broadcasting for WPGA-TV/Macon (giving Gray a full-power station in each market in its home state of Georgia). Marquee unwound KNIN's SSA with Scripps and entered into agreements with Sinclair's KBOI-TV to provide news programming and technical services, while maintaining control over sales and retransmission consent negotiations. Gray would acquire American Spirit Media outright in 2026, after which it ended WUPW's SSA with WTOL and merged the station's operations into WTVG.
- Granite Broadcasting operated virtual duopolies in Fort Wayne, Indiana and Duluth, Minnesota with the sidecar Malara Broadcast Group. The stations were later sold to Quincy Media and SagamoreHill Broadcasting, with Quincy temporarily operating SagamoreHill's stations under an SSA. In Fort Wayne, Quincy acquired the previous junior partner, Malara's ABC affiliate WPTA, with SagamoreHill taking NBC affiliate WISE-TV instead.
- News-Press & Gazette Company is affiliated with the sidecar VistaWest Media for stations such as KIDK (which was previously taken over by NPG under Fisher Communications ownership) and KCOY-TV (under Cowles Publishing Company ownership). Both companies are based in St. Joseph, Missouri.

=== Effects on programming ===
The stations partnered through a sharing agreement may also consolidate their programming operations: local newscasts on the junior partner in the LMA, if it operated a separate news department before the LMA's formation, may be rescheduled or scaled back to prevent direct competition with newscasts airing on the station acting as the senior partner (the latter aspect is less common with LMAs involving only stations affiliated with one of the four largest broadcast television networks). The stations may share news-gathering resources, but maintain separate news telecasts that are differentiated by their on-air presentation, anchors, and overall format, with varying degrees of autonomy; in these cases, a seemingly separate newscast on the brokered station in the duopoly may ultimately consist of repackaged news content from the other station. Alternatively, the stations may consolidate their news programming under a single joint brand.

Redundant staff members are often laid off as part of the consolidation process, and the sharing of news content reduces the number of unique editorial voices in the market. This in particular is one of the caveats of pushes to ban outsourcing agreements by media consolidation critics, who also suggest that LMAs result in a decreased amount of local news coverage on the brokered station.

Depending on how the outsourcing agreement is structured, as well as how the brokered station is programmed, how the stations are consolidated and the amount of news programming featured on the brokered station may vary, for example:

- In October 2008, Tribune Broadcasting and Local TV LLC consolidated the operations of their respective CW and Fox affiliates in Denver and St. Louis, resulting from a groupwide management agreement between both companies. In Denver, CW affiliate KWGN-TV moved into Fox affiliate KDVR's facilities in the Speer neighborhood; while in St. Louis, Fox affiliate KTVI—despite being the senior partner in the LMA with CW affiliate KPLR—moved into the latter station's Maryland Heights studios. Both cities were (and still are) top-25 markets, making Denver and St. Louis the largest where any English-language stations were involved in an LMA; however, both cities had enough stations to allow a legal duopoly (this was not possible with KPLR and KTVI as both were among the four highest-rated stations in St. Louis at the time, placing ahead of ratings-challenged ABC affiliate KDNL-TV), and were large enough to support at least four television news operations (Denver had five and St. Louis had four news-producing stations prior to the formation of the LMA).

KWGN and KPLR moved The CW's primetime lineup one hour later (to 8:00 p.m.) than the network-recommended timeslot, and shifted their evening newscasts to 7:00 p.m. (weekend editions of the evening newscasts were discontinued with the move; KPLR has since expanded its 7:00 p.m. newscast to Saturday and Sunday evenings) to avoid competing with KDVR and KTVI's 9:00 p.m. newscasts; KWGN retained its weekday morning newscast (which competed directly with KDVR's morning newscast), but canceled its 5:30 p.m.—and later, 11:00 a.m.—newscasts. In contrast, KPLR (which had run a primetime newscast for much of its history) eventually added hour-long midday and late afternoon newscasts. The two LMA arrangements became legal duopolies in December 2013, once Tribune finalized its acquisition of Local TV.

- In 2009, Raycom Media (owner of Honolulu-based NBC and MyNetworkTV affiliates, KHNL and KFVE) announced it would take over the operations of local CBS affiliate KGMB (then owned by MCG Capital Corporation), giving it control of three of the television stations in Hawaii. The deal was a complex arrangement which involved trading the non-license assets of KFVE (such as its call sign, programming, and network affiliation) for those of KGMB (effectively placing the station under Raycom ownership, but using KFVE's license, signal, and virtual channel 5), and taking over KFVE (which moved to the channel 9 license owned by MCG Capital) under a shared services agreement. Due to its nature, the swap was not a transaction that would require the intervention of the FCC, aside from the changing of call signs. The three stations were then folded into a shared news operation branded as Hawaii News Now. An estimated 68 positions from a total of 198 from the three stations would be eliminated as part of the agreement. On November 20, 2013, MCG Capital filed to sell KFVE to the aforementioned American Spirit Media. Following the acquisition of Raycom by Gray Television, KFVE's license was sold to Nexstar (owner of Fox affiliate KHON-TV), who relaunched the station as KHII.
- In 2010, the operations of Schurz Communications-owned NBC affiliate WAGT in Augusta, Georgia were taken over by Media General-owned ABC affiliate WJBF. Both stations were consolidated into new, high-definition capable facilities constructed on the site of a former Barnes & Noble store, with separate studios for each station, and a third, shared studio. Despite the consolidation, the two stations aimed to maintain some autonomy from each other: both WAGT and WJBF maintained their own on-air identities, newsrooms, and sales departments within the facility. While the newscasts on both stations did share some "factual" video content, they were otherwise produced independently of each other. However, upon the consolidation, most of WAGT's managerial staff were dismissed and other employees were reassigned to different positions. The agreement was unwound after Gray's purchase of the station, but briefly reinstated following legal action by Media General. After the injunction was struck down, Gray re-assumed control of WAGT on March 28, 2016, adding 5:30 p.m. and 7:00 p.m. newscasts exclusive to the station, with the remainder simulcast from WRDW.
- In 2010, Nexstar announced a new joint news operation under the Eyewitness News title for its consolidated cluster in Utica/Rome, New York, consisting of Nexstar-owned Fox and MyNetworkTV affiliates WFXV and WPNY-LP, and Mission-owned ABC affiliate WUTR. Unlike the other examples, neither station had a pre-existing newscast at the time; WUTR's original news department was closed in 2003 by previous owner Clear Channel Communications as a cost-saving measure, and WFXV had never aired local news programming at all. Its slate included early and late evening newscasts on WUTR, an encore of WUTR's evening newscast on WPNY, and a 10:00 p.m. newscast on WFXV with a fast-paced format targeting younger demographics. The station's executive vice president, Steve Merren (who had come from NBC affiliate WKTV, which had the sole television news operation in the market prior to the formation of Nexstar's news operation) believed that it "[was] important that the community has another source of news. We have one newspaper and one news station and the community could benefit from another voice."
- In Evansville, Indiana, Mission Broadcasting acquired then-independent station WTVW (now a CW affiliate) in 2011 with its former owner Nexstar Broadcasting retaining operational duties under an SSA. WTVW consolidated news operations with ABC affiliate WEHT, for which Nexstar traded WTVW to Mission in exchange for acquiring WEHT from Gilmore Broadcasting Corporation, and cut back its newscast output through the reductions of its weekday morning newscast from four hours to two and its 6:00 p.m. newscast—except on Sundays, where it remained one hour—from one hour to 30 minutes (leaving only a two-hour morning newscast, half-hour noon and 6:30 p.m. newscasts and an hour-long newscast at 9:00 p.m.). Both stations were then folded into a shared news operation branded as Eyewitness News.
- In November 2011, in the Tucson, Arizona, market, Belo relinquished the operations of its Fox and MyNetworkTV duopoly KMSB and KTTU to Raycom Media. Operations of the two stations, along with production of KMSB's 9:00 p.m. newscast, were assumed by Raycom's CBS station KOLD-TV. Belo Media Operations president Peter L. Diaz touted that the consolidation would result in "better produced, increased news programming for the Tucson market," citing Raycom's addition of a locally produced morning newscast to KMSB, and the upgrade of KMSB's news programming to high definition as part of the transition. Although ruling out the need to do so in other markets, Diaz noted that the agreements "[allowed] us to increase our news product that we couldn't afford to do otherwise." The consolidation resulted in layoffs for almost all of the two stations' employees, aside from advertising sales staff, which remained employed by Belo but worked from KOLD's facilities. The acquisition of Belo by Gannett in 2013 had few effects on the virtual triopoly; although the stations' licenses were sold to third-parties to satisfy newspaper cross-ownership restrictions, Raycom still operated the stations, but their sales departments remained operated by Gannett. The licenses were, in turn, sold to Tegna—the spin-out of Gannett's broadcasting division, in December 2015.
- The 2012 sale of Newport Television led to the formation of two full-power virtual quadropolies. In Little Rock, Arkansas, Nexstar and Mission Broadcasting formed a virtual quadropoly consisting of two duopolies; NBC station KARK-TV and MyNetworkTV station KARZ-TV (owned by Nexstar), along with Fox station KLRT-TV and CW station KASN (owned by Mission, operated by Nexstar under a local marketing agreement). All four stations were consolidated into KARK's facilities; 30 employees were laid off as part of the consolidation. As a result, KLRT reduced its weeknight 5:00 p.m. newscast from one hour to 30 minutes (limiting it to the 5:30 half-hour) and dropped its 10:00 p.m. newscast, while adding a two-hour weekday morning newscast and retaining its existing hour-long newscast at 9:00 p.m.

Sinclair formed a similar arrangement in Mobile, Alabama between its existing Pensacola duopoly of ABC affiliate WEAR-TV and MyNetworkTV affiliate WFGX, and the newly acquired Mobile duopoly of NBC affiliate WPMI and independent station WJTC (owned by Deerfield Media). However, the stations were not consolidated, and maintained their own studio facilities, news departments and staff. WEAR and WPMI also produced competing 9:00 p.m. newscasts for their respective duopoly partners. In October 2025, WPMI's NBC programming was consolidated onto a subchannel of WEAR.

== Reaction and government action ==
In February 2001, Clear Channel Communications subsidiary Citicasters was fined $25,000 for its use of time brokerage agreements and litigation for unlawfully controlling Youngstown, Ohio area radio station WBTJ (101.9 FM, now WYLR); the company had also been the target of complaints for using KFJO (FM) to rebroadcast KSJO after it had nominally sold KFJO to minority-owned interests.

In 2009, the Media Council of Hawaii complained to the FCC about Raycom's Hawaii News Now operation, stating that it would "directly reduce the diversity of local voices in a community by replacing independent newscasts on the brokered station with those of the brokering station." In response, the FCC stated it would begin an investigation into the matter.

In 2011, after temporarily losing its Fox affiliation for WFFT-TV to a subchannel of WISE-TV due to a reverse compensation dispute, Nexstar (ironically, given its use of similar practices in other markets) filed an antitrust lawsuit against the station's managing partner, Granite Broadcasting, arguing that it had built a monopoly on local advertising sales by having effective control of the outlets for four major networks (ABC and MyNetworkTV on WPTA, and NBC, Fox, and The CW on WISE-TV; owned by Malara Broadcast Group and operated under agreements by Granite). The lawsuit was settled in February 2013 via mutual agreement, after which the Fox affiliation was given back to WFFT.

=== Acquisitions ===
==== Gannett acquisition of Belo ====
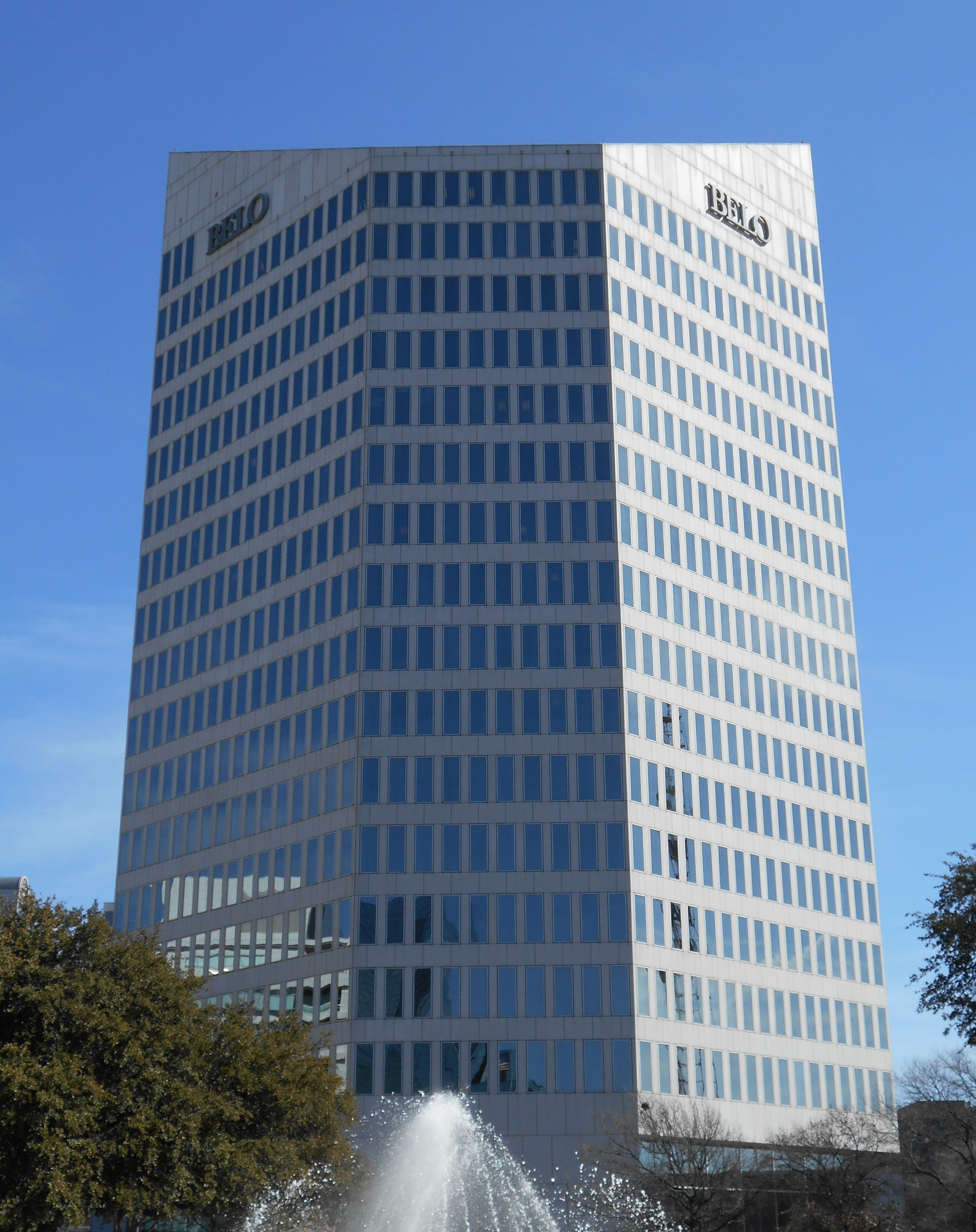
Belo Tower in Dallas, Texas.

Gannett Company's 2013 acquisition of Belo was opposed by organizations such as the American Cable Association and Free Press, due to Gannett's plans to use LMAs and two shell companies owned by former Belo and Fisher Communications executives (Sander Media and Tucker Operating Co. respectively) to dodge FCC newspaper cross-ownership restrictions in Louisville, Phoenix, Portland, Oregon and Tucson. Although Gannett contended that the arrangements were legal, Free Press president Craig Aaron stated that "the FCC shouldn't let Gannett break the rules. Media consolidation results in fewer journalists in the newsroom and fewer opinions on the airwaves. Concentrating media outlets in the hands of just a few companies benefits only the companies themselves." The deal would have given Gannett a virtual triopoly in Phoenix, consisting of its NBC station KPNX, independent station KTVK and CW affiliate KASW. In Tucson, Fox affiliate KMSB and MyNetworkTV affiliate KTTU were already operated by Raycom Media's CBS affiliate KOLD-TV under a shared services agreement established under Belo ownership, but Gannett would still handle advertising sales for the stations.

In December 2013, the U.S. Department of Justice blocked Gannett from using an agreement with Sander Media to operate CBS affiliate KMOV in St. Louis alongside its own NBC station KSDK, and ordered Gannett to sell KMOV. Even though Gannett planned to operate KMOV separately from KSDK, the Department ruled the agreement to be a violation of antitrust law, as it would reduce competition for advertising sales. Following the closure of the Belo purchase, Meredith Corporation announced a deal to purchase KMOV, along with KTVK and KASW. As Meredith would have a duopoly between KTVK and its Phoenix CBS affiliate KPHO-TV, KASW was to be sold to SagamoreHill Broadcasting and operated by Meredith under an LMA. As a result of the FCC's scrutiny on any new station sharing agreements, on October 23, 2014, Meredith would backtrack on this plan and instead sell KASW to Nexstar, which would operate the station independently of KTVK and KPHO.

Following Gannett's split into independent broadcasting and publishing companies, Tegna Inc.—the owner of Gannett's stations following the split, bought back the licenses to the Sander Media stations, placing them back under its full control.

==== Sinclair acquisition of Allbritton ====
As part of its planned acquisition of Allbritton Communications, Sinclair originally planned to sell its existing stations in three markets—Charleston, South Carolina, Birmingham, Alabama and Harrisburg, Pennsylvania—where Allbritton already owned stations, but continued to operate them under local marketing agreements. WABM and WTTO in Birmingham and WHP-TV in Harrisburg were to be sold to Deerfield Media, and WMMP in Charleston was to be sold to Howard Stirk Holdings–a broadcasting company owned by conservative pundit Armstrong Williams. Howard Stirk Holdings was first established in 2013 with its acquisition of two conflicting stations in Sinclair's earlier acquisition of Barrington Broadcasting.

In December 2013, FCC Video Division Chief Barbara Kreisman sent a letter demanding information from Sinclair on the financial aspects of its "sidecar" operations, and warned that in the three aforementioned markets, "the proposed transactions would result in the elimination of the grandfathered status of certain local marketing agreements and thus cause the transactions to violate our local TV ownership rules." It was asserted that the deal might only be legal if the affected stations were operated under shared services agreements. Sinclair restructured the deal in March 2014, choosing to sell WHP-TV, WMMP and WABM, and terminate an SSA with the Cunningham-owned Fox affiliate WTAT in Charleston to acquire the Allbritton-owned stations in those markets (WCIV, WHTM-TV and WBMA-LD, while also creating a new duopoly between the ABC and CW affiliates in Birmingham), as well as foregoing any operational or financial agreements with the buyers of the stations being sold to other parties.

In May 2014, Sinclair disclosed in an FCC filling that it was unable to find buyers for the three affected stations, requiring changes to its transaction. In Harrisburg, Sinclair chose to retain WHP-TV, and divest WHTM to Media General. However, in Charleston and Birmingham, the company proposed to shut down stations entirely (rather than selling them to other buyers that would also handle their operational responsibilities) so it could maintain legal duopolies; surrendering the licenses for WCIV and the full-powered repeaters of WBMA-LD (WJSU and WCFT), and moving their ABC programming to Sinclair's existing stations WMMP and WABM respectively—which would shift their existing MyNetworkTV programming to digital subchannels. After nearly a year of delays, Sinclair's deal to acquire Allbritton was approved by the FCC on July 24, 2014.

==== Nexstar acquisition of Tribune ====
Nexstar Media Group acquired Tribune Media in 2019; to meet ownership limits, it divested 21 stations to the E. W. Scripps Company, Tegna Inc., and Circle City Broadcasting. The divested stations included Tribune's New York City flagship WPIX; the station was sold to Scripps, but with a $75 million option for Nexstar to buy it back between March 31, 2020 and December 31, 2021. Nexstar transferred this option to Mission Broadcasting, who subsequently exercised it in August 2020 (the following month, Scripps announced its intent to acquire Ion Media, including its New York station WPXN-TV). In October 2022, Nexstar would acquire a majority ownership in that station's network affiliation, The CW.

In March 2024, the FCC fined Nexstar and Mission $1.2 million and $612,395 respectively, and ordered Mission to sell WPIX within twelve months; the FCC found that Mission's agreements with Nexstar to operate WPIX amounted to an "unauthorized transfer of control" of the station, thus exceeding the FCC's 39% market share limit for broadcasters. Nexstar had to either divest other stations so it could legally own WPIX, or Mission would have to sell the station to a third-party. Mission Broadcasting also scrapped its planned acquisition of Detroit's MyNetworkTV station WADL (which briefly became Detroit's new CW affiliate in September 2023 after CBS News and Stations dropped long-time affiliate WKBD) after the FCC imposed conditions on Nexstar's involvement in the station. WADL had dropped The CW in late-October following demands that it be compensated for its "transitional" carriage of the network while the acquisition pended; independent station WMYD would carry the network for the remainder of the television season, before ultimately returning to WKBD.

=== FCC limits on joint sales agreements for television stations ===
In response to criticism of the virtual duopolies and sharing agreements, the FCC began to consider potential changes to address these loopholes. In March 2013, the Commission first tabled a proposal that would make joint sales agreements count the same as ownership.

In January 2014 town hall meeting, FCC chairman Tom Wheeler disclosed that he planned to place more scrutiny on the use of LMA-style agreements and shell companies, stating that "there were a couple of references in a couple of recent decisions in which we've said that we're going to do things differently going forward on what were called these shell corporations." Later that month, it was reported that the FCC had placed all pending acquisitions involving the use of shell companies on hold, so the commission could discuss changes to its policies. Among the deals affected by this decision included the aforementioned Sinclair/Allbritton purchase.

On March 6, 2014, the FCC announced that it would hold a vote on March 31 on a proposal to ban joint sales agreements involving television stations outright, making them attributable to FCC ownership limits if the senior partner sold 15% or more of advertising time of a competing junior partner station in the JSA; the ban would apply to both existing sharing agreements under such a structure as well as pending station transactions that included a JSA. Station owners would be given a two-year grace period to unwind or modify joint sales agreements in violation of the policy; coordinated retransmission consent negotiations between two of the four highest-rated stations in a single market would also be barred under the proposal. Wheeler also proposed an expedited process to review joint sales agreements on a case-by-case basis, granting a waiver of the rules if a broadcaster could prove a particular joint sales agreement arrangement served the public interest.

On March 12, 2014, the FCC Media Bureau released a notice that it would further analyze television station transactions that included sharing agreements, particularly those that included a purchase option that "may counter any incentive the licensee has to increase the value of the station, since the licensee may be unlikely to realize that increased value." Under the new provisions, broadcasters would be required to demonstrate in their transaction applications as to how such deals would serve the public interest. The National Association of Broadcasters (NAB)—which, along with station groups such as Sinclair Broadcast Group, have disapproved of the proposal to ban JSAs—presented a compromise proposal, in which the brokered licensee in a sharing agreement would retain control over at least 85 percent of the station's programming, maintain at least 70 percent of ad sales revenue and "maintain at least 20 percent of station value in the license itself". FCC commissioner Ajit Pai, and Gordon Smith, president of the NAB, were also opposed to the new rules on joint sales agreements, believing that they would discourage the ownership of television stations by minority-owned companies. Tom Wheeler, however, proposed the restrictions in the hopes of encouraging more women and minorities to own stations, due to the ongoing consolidation in the television industry through company mergers and sharing agreements.

On March 31, 2014, the FCC voted 3–2 to approve the proposed ban on joint sales agreements and voted 5–0 to approve the proposed ban on coordinated retransmission consent negotiations between two of the four highest-rated stations within a given market; the JSA ban went into effect on June 19, 2014. Under the restrictions, the FCC would rule on waivers to maintain select existing JSAs within 90 days of the application's filing. The FCC also began a request for comment on policies to address other agreements, such as shared services agreements. The prohibition on television JSAs had been proposed as early as 2004, a year after the FCC voted to treat JSAs between radio stations as duopolies. Despite this fact, broadcasting companies criticized the ban, accusing the commission of using it as a move to encourage participation in a spectrum incentive auction then set to occur in 2015, and stating that the ban would place them at a disadvantage during retransmission consent negotiations with pay television providers.

On December 19, 2015, as a rider to the federal budget, the grace period for unwinding or modifying existing JSAs was extended to 10 years. On May 25, 2016, the United States Court of Appeals for the Third Circuit struck down the restrictions on joint sales agreements, ruling that the FCC could not manipulate its ownership rules without "[in] the previous four years, [fulfilling] its obligation to review [the] rule and determine whether it is in the public interest". On November 16, 2017, under the Trump administration, the FCC voted in favor of no longer having JSAs attributable to ownership.

=== Divestment and subchannel consolidation of stations ===
The increased scrutiny being imposed by the FCC regarding local marketing, shared services, and joint sales agreements led to more drastic measures by broadcasting companies attempting to use them in acquisitions; in 2014, two broadcasting companies declared intents to shut acquired stations down entirely and consolidate their programming onto existing stations through multicasting, rather than attempting to use sidecars and sharing agreements or selling them to other parties that would assume full responsibility of their day-to-day operations.

In May 2014, Sinclair informed the FCC that it was unable to find buyers for WABM or WMMP—the company's MyNetworkTV stations in Birmingham, Alabama, and Charleston, South Carolina, that it planned to sell in its purchase of Allbritton Communications. In Birmingham, the company proposed surrendering the licenses of WCFT-TV and WJSU-TV—the two full-powered satellites of ABC affiliate WBMA-LD, converting WABM into a full-powered satellite of WBMA-LD—and moving its existing MyNetworkTV programming to a digital subchannel of WABM (although the WBMA-LD simulcast was placed on WABM's subchannel instead while MyNetworkTV programming was retained on its main channel). Similarly, in Charleston, Sinclair planned to surrender WCIV's license and move its ABC affiliation and programming to WMMP. In both cases, Sinclair believed that its own stations had superior technical facilities than those of the stations it intends to surrender. Sinclair was able to retain WBMA-LD in any event as the FCC did not impose any ownership limits on low-power stations.

On June 13, 2014, Gray Television announced that it would shutter six stations and consolidate existing programming onto subchannels of Gray-owned stations in their respective market. Unlike Sinclair, however, Gray stated that it would sell the licenses of the shuttered stations to minority-owned broadcasters in collaboration with the Minority Media and Telecommunications Council—under the condition that they would operate them independently from other stations in the market, and without the use of any sharing agreements. All six of the stations were owned by companies other than Gray, but their non-license assets were either owned by Gray, or operated by stations now owned by Gray under agreements. Gray would operate the affected stations under LMAs until the sales and consolidation were complete. Aside from one, most of the stations involved in these changes were related to Gray's acquisition of stations from Hoak Media. Three of these stations were immediately shut down the same day, while the remainder remained operated by Gray until the sales were completed. Gray announced buyers for the stations on August 27, 2014.

The six stations affected by Gray's move included:

- KHAS-TV (Hastings/Lincoln, Nebraska), previously owned by Hoak. On June 13, 2014, KHAS-TV was shut down and its NBC programming was moved to the primary channel of KSNB-TV (channel 4). Gray had bought KSNB under a failing station waiver to form a duopoly with CBS station KOLN/KGIN, and operated the station as a MyNetworkTV/MeTV affiliate with local programming focused on central Nebraska; this existing programming was moved to KSNB-DT2 upon the transition. On August 27, 2014, the station was sold to Legacy Broadcasting. On May 21, 2018, Gray agreed to acquire KNHL from Legacy Broadcasting for $475,000, becoming a satellite station of KSNB-TV.
- KNDX/KXND (Bismarck/Minot, North Dakota), owned by Prime Cities Broadcasting, which asked the FCC to dismiss the sale of the stations to Excalibur Broadcasting (a sidecar owned by former Gray executive Don Ray), which would have made them sisters to the NBC North Dakota chain being acquired from Hoak by Gray. Gray acquired the stations' non-license assets on May 1, 2014; both stations were then taken off the air on June 13, 2014, with Fox programming being moved to subchannels of the NBC North Dakota stations (KMOT, KQCD-TV and KFYR-TV). On August 27, 2014, the stations were sold to Legacy Broadcasting.
- KXJB-TV and KAQY (Fargo, North Dakota and Columbia/Monroe, Louisiana–El Dorado, Arkansas), both owned by Parker Broadcasting and operated by Hoak (now Gray) stations. Both were originally to be sold to Excalibur Broadcasting. On August 27, 2014, KXJB-TV was sold to Major Market Broadcasting, and KAQY to Legacy Broadcasting.
- KJCT (Grand Junction, Colorado), acquired by Excalibur in August 2013 from News-Press & Gazette Company, and taken over by Gray-owned KKCO following the acquisition. On August 27, 2014, the station was sold to Chang Media Group, and was later re-launched as Cozi TV station KGBY.

Following the approval of Sinclair's purchase of Allbritton, commissioner Ajit Pai further criticized the FCC's new policies and its endorsement of Sinclair's proposal to shut down stations to comply with them. Describing the three Allbritton stations as being "victims" of the "crackdown" against joint sales agreements, he stated regarding WCIV that "apparently the Commission believes that it is better for that station to go out of business than for Howard Stirk Holdings to own the station and participate in a joint sales agreement with Sinclair. I strongly disagree. And so too, I'll bet, would consumers in Charleston." In September 2014, Sinclair backtracked on its original plans, and reached deals to sell WCIV, WCFT and WJSU's license assets to Howard Stirk Holdings for $50,000 each and lease them studio space, pending FCC approval. Unlike Howard Stirk Holdings' other stations, they are operated and programmed independently, and Sinclair did not enter into any agreements to operate the stations on Howard Stirk's behalf.

In Quincy Newspapers' acquisition of Granite Broadcasting's remaining stations, the acquisition was briefly re-structured to have Malara Broadcast Group—which served as a virtual duopoly partner for Granite with WISE-TV (NBC) Fort Wayne and KDLH-TV Duluth (CBS), retain the stations and their operating agreements with WPTA and KBJR-TV in lieu of having them sold to SagamoreHill Broadcasting. The acquisition was restructured in July 2015 to, again, have SagamoreHill Broadcasting acquire the two stations, but have their SSAs wound down within nine months. Following the end of the SSA, the two stations retained The CW as independently run stations, with their remaining affiliations moved to subchannels of KBJR and WPTA. Quincy similarly wound down an SSA in Peoria, Illinois with Sinclair-owned WHOI by trading its South Bend Fox affiliation (previously held by WSJV-TV) to Sinclair (where it moved to a subchannel of WSBT-TV), in exchange for WHOI's ABC and CW affiliations, which moved to subchannels of WEEK-TV. In 2018, Quincy re-purchased WISE and KDLH, under an assertion that both stations were not within the top 4 of their respective markets.

=== WAGT dispute ===
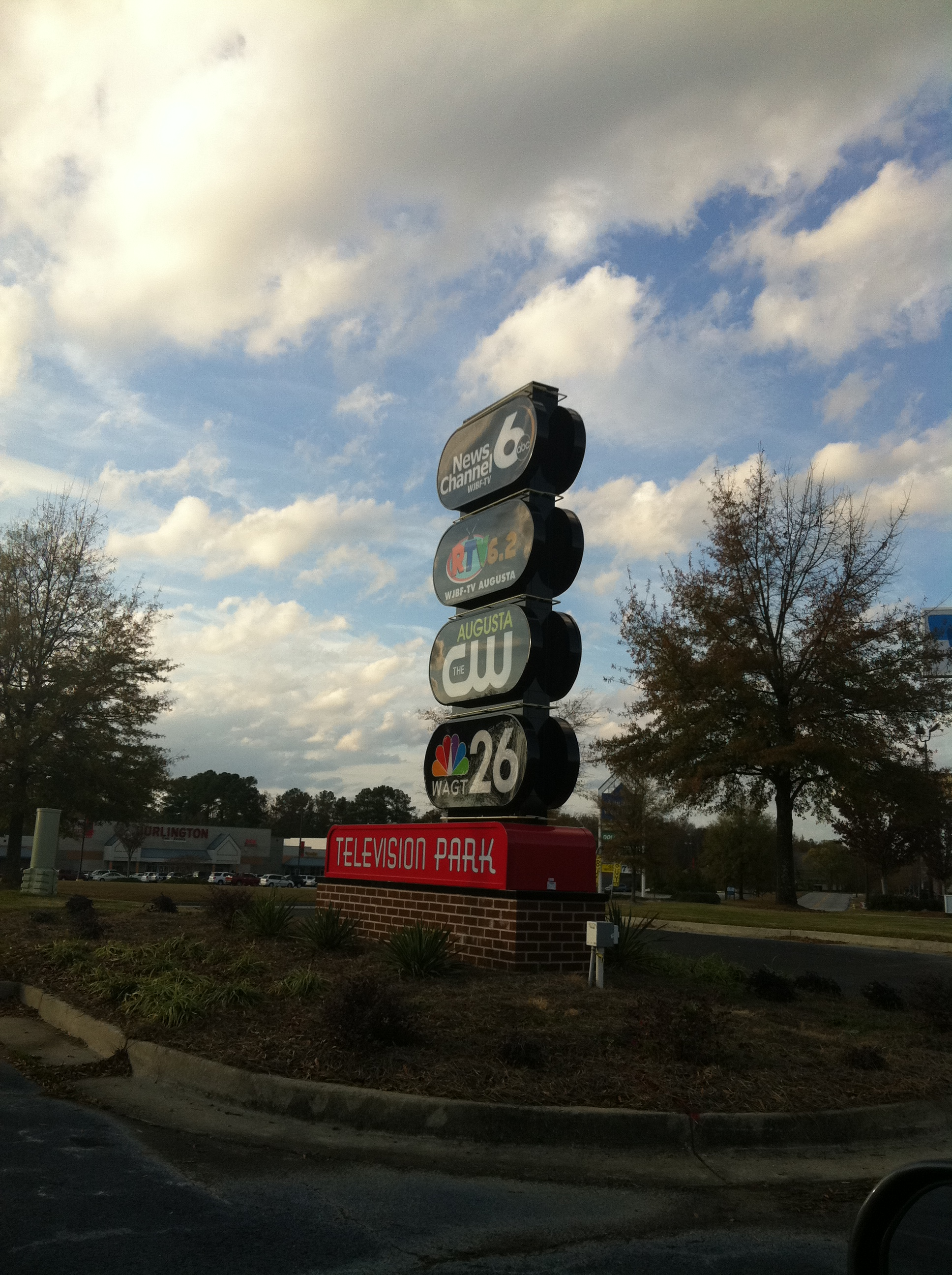
Outside Television Park, the facilities which were shared by WJBF and WAGT.

In February 2016, Gray Television acquired Schurz Communications' stations, including Augusta, Georgia's WAGT. As Gray could not own both WAGT and its existing CBS affiliate WRDW-TV as a legal duopoly, Gray proposed the sale of WAGT's broadcast spectrum during the incentive auction, and for WAGT to go silent upon completion of the deal so the company would not be running more than one of the top four stations in the market. Gray also requested special temporary authority for WAGT's signal to be replaced on its existing technical facilities and UHF channel 30 by the co-owned low-power station, WRDW-CD; low-power stations were not subject to ownership caps and restrictions on duopolies.

The FCC, however, required that Gray continue to operate WAGT as a separate station through the end of the auction, and not enter into any joint sales agreements. Upon the closure of the sale, Gray unwound the shared services and joint sales agreements that Schurz had established with WJBF-TV and Media General, and replaced its previous news programs with simulcasts from WRDW. Gray also accused WJBF of "[refusing] to agree to a smooth transition of personnel [from WAGT]", as WAGT's employees fell under the employment of Media General due to the SSA.

On February 26, 2016, Media General obtained a preliminary injunction against Gray for violating the SSA and JSA, which required Gray to return control of WAGT to Media General, and forbade Gray from selling WAGT in the spectrum incentive auction. The company accused Gray of using the spectrum auction and sale of the station to exit the agreements illegitimately, as they were to last through 2020, and apply to any future owner of WAGT. Gray attempted to block the injunction by arguing that its actions were required in order to comply with the FCC's prohibition of joint sales agreements, but was denied. Media General took back control of WAGT on March 7, 2016.

On March 10, 2016, FCC Deputy General Counsel David Gossett announced that the commission would investigate Media General's actions as possibly being in violation of Section 310(d) of the Communications Act. Gossett argued that by legally blocking Gray's participation in the spectrum auction, Media General had "[sought] injunctive relief that interferes with a licensee's ultimate control of a station". He also stated that the FCC would consider a license revocation hearing against Media General under Section 312 of the Communications Act. On March 23, 2016, the Supreme Court of Georgia struck down the injunction without addressing the litigation, and Gray took back control of WAGT. On July 13, 2016, Media General was issued a $700,000 fine by the FCC. WAGT's spectrum sold for $40,763,036.

=== DirecTV lawsuit ===
In March 2023, DirecTV sued Nexstar Media Group, alleging that it was conspiring with the sidecar companies Mission Broadcasting and White Knight Broadcasting to manipulate retransmission fees for its stations. The company, which had been in a carriage dispute with Mission and White Knight since October 2022, stated that the companies "effectively relinquished decision-making authority to Nexstar, which has served as the ringleader of a conspiracy to harm competition and violate the antitrust laws."

== Internationally ==
=== Canada ===
Local marketing agreements are effectively prohibited under the regulations of the CRTC, which require that all broadcast undertakings be "operated in fact by the licensee itself". Rogers Media and Newcap Broadcasting maintained a joint sales agreement pertaining to CHNO-FM in Sudbury, Ontario, but community interests and the lobby group Friends of Canadian Broadcasting presented substantial evidence to the CRTC that in practice, the agreement was a de facto LMA, going significantly beyond advertising sales into program production and news-gathering. In early 2005, the CRTC ordered the agreement to cease.

For a time, CKEY-FM in Fort Erie, Ontario had a JSA with Citadel Communications to handle U.S. advertising sales for the station under a revenue sharing agreement, integrating it with its cluster in nearby Buffalo, New York. In an associated agreement, the station also contracted Citadel employees to produce some of its programming. Due to the structure of this JSA, and because the aforementioned programming was overseen by local producers, the CRTC deemed that the agreement did not equate to a transfer of effective control of the station to Citadel, and thus complied with its regulations (taking greater issue with the amount of locally-reflective programming carried by the station).

Rogers Media previously held a time-brokerage agreement with CBC Television to air Hockey Night in Canada on the network as part of its exclusive rights to the National Hockey League, in order to maintain the long-running franchise and the league's presence on CBC. In exchange for assigning commercial advertising time to Rogers, the CBC did not pay a rights fee, and also received advertising time for its own programming during Hockey Night broadcasts. The CBC also initially received payments for use of some of its staff and its Toronto studios. To legally assign responsibility to Rogers, the broadcasts were considered to be the programming of a CRTC-licensed television network owned by Rogers' Sportsnet subsidiary, which had an affiliation with all of CBC Television's stations. Despite the legal nature of this arrangement, the broadcasts still contained CBC Television branding and continuity.

=== Philippines ===
In Filipino radio and television, a number of broadcasters are known for engaging in airtime lease or "blocktimer" agreements in order to provide outlets for their programming, especially if they do not, or are legally incapable of holding a broadcast license.

In 2008, the Associated Broadcasting Company leased its airtime to the Malaysian media conglomerate Media Prima through the local subsidiary MPB Primedia and relaunched as TV5, with MPB Primedia providing entertainment programming, and the ABC handling news programming and operations. Soon afterward, ABC and Media Prima were sued by rival media company GMA Network, who accused the partnership of contravening laws requiring domestic ownership of broadcasters. In response, ABC's media relations head Pat Marcelo-Magbanua reiterated that MPB Primedia was a Filipino company that was self-registered and Filipino-run. The concerns became moot in 2010, when Media Prima announced it would divest its ownership in the network to PLDT's broadcasting subsidiary MediaQuest Holdings.

In May 2020, ABS-CBN—which was one of the country's largest commercial broadcasters—closed its broadcast radio and television stations after its broadcast franchises were not renewed by Congress. The company subsequently began to rely on cable television channels (including Kapamilya Channel, a new flagship channel that it launched in response to the closure), and selling ABS-CBN Studios programs to competitors such as GMA Network and TV5 (under which it had negotiated a five-year agreement to carry various ABS-CBN Studios productions). ABS-CBN would enter into more extensive leasing agreements with several broadcasters in particular; in October 2020, religious broadcaster ZOE Broadcasting Network began a joint venture with ABS-CBN known as A2Z, which featured a mixture of ABS-CBN-provided entertainment programming, and its existing religious programming. In 2023, Philippine Collective Media Corporation entered into a joint venture with ABS-CBN to program DWPM, a new station that had been established on the former frequency of ABS-CBN's news talk DZMM. In May 2025, the station relaunched under the DZMM branding.

In 2024, ABS-CBN would enter into an agreement with Manny Villar's Advanced Media Broadcasting System (AMBS)—which had been awarded some of ABS-CBN's former broadcast frequencies, including its former flagship channel 2 in Manila—to lease time on its new network All TV; initially, this would consist of simulcasts of programming from its cable network Jeepney TV, along with the ABS-CBN-produced daytime shows Magandang Buhay and It's Showtime, and flagship newscast TV Patrol. In December 2025, ABS-CBN broke away from its agreement with TV5 due to disputes over rights fees; All TV would simulcast the programming of Kapamilya Channel full-time beginning January 2, 2026. ABS-CBN would later reconcile with TV5 to acquire rights to selected shows.

=== Brazil ===
In Brazil, SBT has a local marketing agreement with Grupo Norte to operate SBT Pará in Belém, Pará.

== See also ==
- Concentration of media ownership
- Broadcast syndication
- Local News Service
