= WISE-TV =

Television station in Fort Wayne, Indiana

- Fort Wayne, Indiana; United States
- Channels: Digital: 34 (UHF); Virtual: 33
- Branding: Fort Wayne CW 33.1

Programming
- Affiliations: 33.1: The CW Plus; for others, see § Subchannels

Ownership
- Owner: Gray Media (sale pending to an unknown third party); (Gray Television Licensee, LLC)
- Sister stations: WPTA, WFFT-TV

History
- First air date: November 21, 1953
- Former call signs: WKJG-TV (1953–2003)
- Former channel numbers: Analog: 33 (UHF, 1953–2009); Digital: 18 (UHF, until 2018)
- Former affiliations: NBC (1953–2016); MyNetworkTV (33.2, primary 2006–2011 and 2013–2016; secondary 2011–2013); Fox (33.2, 2011–2013)
- Call sign meaning: "Wise" or "wisdom"

Technical information
- Licensing authority: FCC
- Facility ID: 13960
- ERP: 456 kW; 164 kW (STA)
- HAAT: 228.6 m (750 ft); 206.4 m (677 ft) (STA)
- Transmitter coordinates: 41°6′7.6″N 85°11′3.6″W

Links
- Public license information: Public file; LMS
- Website: yourcwtv.com/partners/fortwayne/

WISE-TV (channel 33) is a television station in Fort Wayne, Indiana, United States, affiliated with The CW Plus. It is owned by Gray Media alongside ABC/NBC/MyNetworkTV affiliate WPTA (channel 21) and Fox affiliate WFFT-TV (channel 55). WISE-TV and WPTA share studios and transmitter facilities on Butler Road in Northwest Fort Wayne.

WISE-TV originally operated as an NBC affiliate from its establishment through 2016, where as the result of Quincy Media's acquisition of WPTA (which had previously been operated by WISE's former owner, Granite Broadcasting, as part of a shared services agreement), the NBC affiliation became the property of Quincy and was moved to WPTA's second digital subchannel in exchange for its CW affiliation.

== History ==
=== WISE-DT1 ===
The station was founded on November 21, 1953, with the call letters WKJG-TV. It was the first television station in Fort Wayne and affiliated with NBC. The station was owned by William Kunkel, owner of The Journal Gazette newspaper (with both entities forming the call letters), WKJG radio (AM 1380 and FM 97.3), and other television stations. On September 30, 1971, the radio stations were sold. Their call letters became WMEE and WMEF-FM respectively. Today, the FM station has the calls WMEE. The AM station went through a variety of call signs including WQHK, WHWD, and WONO. It went back to the original WKJG on November 3, 2003; however, both radio stations are owned by a different company and have no connection with the television station. The first person seen on television in Fort Wayne was Hilliard Gates, who served as the station's general manager and sports director until his retirement in 1990. John Siemer, a newscaster and announcer at the station, was known at that time as "Engineer John" who introduced cartoons.

For a time, WKJG-TV was owned by Terre Haute industrialist Tony Hulman, best known as the longtime owner of the Indianapolis Motor Speedway. Hulman owned other television stations in Indiana, WTHI-TV in Terre Haute and WNDY-TV in Indianapolis. When Hulman died in 1977, Joseph R. Cloutier, a longtime Hulman employee, took over the station. After Cloutier's death, a trust fund called the Corporation for General Trade was formed, with Cloutier's son Joseph A. Cloutier as majority owner with a 51% stake. That company continued to own WKJG-TV until it was sold in 2003.

On January 13, 2003, the Corporation for General Trade was sold for $20 million to New Vision Television. The station changed its call letters to the current WISE-TV on May 26 to celebrate its 50th anniversary. A new transmitter with a stronger signal and new high definition options was installed on the tower. The station was sold again in March 2005 to Granite Broadcasting for $44.2 million. Granite sold ABC affiliate WPTA to Malara Broadcast Group for $45.3 million. A local marketing agreement was established that called for Granite to provide operation services to WPTA as well as for Malara's other new station, KDLH in Duluth, Minnesota. Malara filed its Securities and Exchange Commission reports jointly with Granite, which led to allegations that Granite used Malara as a shell corporation to evade the Federal Communications Commission's (FCC) rules on duopolies. The FCC does not allow common ownership of two of the four largest stations in a single market. Additionally, Fort Wayne has only six full-power stations, too few to allow duopolies in any case.

On January 24, 2006, The WB and UPN announced that they would end broadcasting and merge. The new combined network would be called The CW. The letters would represent the first initial of its corporate parents, CBS (the parent company of UPN) and the Warner Bros. unit of Time Warner. On February 22, News Corporation announced that they would start up another new network called MyNetworkTV. This new service, which would be a sister network to Fox, would be operated by Fox Television Stations and its syndication division, 20th Television. MyNetworkTV was created in order to give UPN and WB stations, not mentioned as becoming CW affiliates, another option besides becoming independent. It was also created to compete against The CW. CBS affiliate WANE-TV aired UPN on a second digital subchannel. The Fort Wayne affiliate of The WB was cable-only "WBFW" which was part of The WB 100+. The station was co-owned with WPTA by Malara Broadcasting. It was announced in March 2006 that WBFW would affiliate with The CW via The CW Plus (a similar operation to The WB 100+). WPTA decided to create a new second digital sub-channel to simulcast WBFW and offer access to CW programming for over-the-air viewers. On September 18, The CW debuted on WBFW (which became officially known as having the WPTA-DT2 calls). The station became known on-air as "Fort Wayne's CW".

On September 5, WISE-TV moved NBC Weather Plus from its second digital subchannel in order for it to become the area's affiliate of MyNetworkTV. Weather Plus then began airing on WISE-TV's third digital subchannel.

After emerging from bankruptcy in the summer of 2007, Granite stock was taken over by Silver Point Capital of Greenwich, Connecticut, a privately owned hedge fund. Silver Point immediately set about breaking up the company; many of its stations laid off employees or cut salaries up to 20%.

On February 11, 2014, Quincy Newspapers agreed to purchase WPTA from the Malara Broadcast Group as part of a deal to purchase Granite Broadcasting's stations in four markets (the other stations were KBJR-TV in Superior, Wisconsin, and its satellite KRII in Chisholm, Minnesota, WEEK-TV in Peoria, Illinois, and WBNG-TV in Binghamton, New York). The WISE-TV license would be acquired by SagamoreHill Broadcasting; however, WPTA (which would be acquired by Quincy outright, making it the senior partner in the Fort Wayne duopoly) would operate WISE-TV through a shared services agreement. In a presentation submitted to the FCC in August 2014, Quincy said that the existing joint sales agreement would be terminated, allowing WISE-TV its own sales staff, and that it would spend $2 million on the construction of a new studio facility at the WPTA site, after which both stations would produce competing live newscasts. In November 2014, the deal was reworked to remove SagamoreHill from the transaction; Quincy will now acquire WISE, with WPTA remaining with Malara.

In July 2015, the deal was reworked yet again to have SagamoreHill acquire WISE, while the SSA between WISE and WPTA (owned by Quincy) would be wound down within nine months of its closure. All of WISE's network affiliations would move to subchannels of WPTA, while WPTA's CW Plus affiliation would move to WISE's main channel. On September 15, 2015, the FCC approved the deal. The sale was completed on November 2, and the switchover occurred on August 1, 2016. Prior to the switch from NBC to The CW, WISE-TV was the second-longest serving NBC affiliate in the state of Indiana after WFIE (which signed on six days before WISE-TV) in Evansville.

On May 21, 2018, it was announced that Quincy Media would acquire WISE-TV outright for $952,884. While the FCC normally prohibits one company from owning two television licenses in the same market when both are among the top four rated stations, Quincy submitted a filing saying that during the November 2017 "sweeps" period, WPTA was the second-ranked station while WISE-TV placed fifth. The sale was completed on August 1.

On May 1, 2019, WISE dropped its radar subchannel and added several standard-definition subchannels: Justice Network on 33.2, Grit on 33.3, Start TV on 33.5, and MeTV on 33.6. It announced plans to add Court TV on 33.4 once that network launches on May 8.

WISE-TV and WPTA gained a new sister station in the market when Gray acquired WFFT-TV on May 1, 2026; as part of the deal, Gray committed to divest WISE-TV within two years.

=== WISE-DT2 ===
Previous logo used from 2011 until March 1, 2013.

Originally established in 2005, WISE-DT2 was part of NBC Weather Plus and known on-air as "Indiana's NewsCenter Weather Plus". The 24-hour weather channel provided local and national weather forecasts. On January 24, 2006, The CW network was established. On February 22, 2006, News Corporation announced the launch of a new "sixth" network called MyNetworkTV.

CBS affiliate WANE-TV (channel 15) offered UPN on its second digital subchannel, while The WB was affiliated with cable-only "WBFW" (with programming provided through The WB 100+, and promotional and advertising services provided by WPTA). On September 5, 2006, WISE-TV moved NBC Weather Plus programming to its third digital subchannel in order for WISE-DT2 to become the area's MyNetworkTV affiliate. The move—along with "WBFW" affiliating with The CW (with the channel being carried on WPTA's second digital subchannel) on September 18—resulted in the deactivation of WANE's second digital subchannel, which remained dark until it affiliated with TheCoolTV in 2010.

In June 2011, it was announced that WISE-DT2 would join Fox beginning August 1, 2011, taking the affiliation from then-current outlet WFFT-TV (owned by the Nexstar Broadcasting Group). The switch was the result of a dispute over retransmission consent fees between Nexstar and Fox. Upon the switch, the station shifted MyNetworkTV to secondary status on WISE-DT2 and began airing the two-hour weeknight programming block from 10:30 p.m. until 12:30 a.m. The first Fox program to air on WISE-DT2 was Hell's Kitchen. With the addition of high definition capabilities to this station, WISE-DT3 (which featured 24-hour national NBC Plus [successor to NBC Weather Plus] and local "The VIPIR Channel" weather programming) moved to WPTA's third digital subchannel (currently home to Indiana's NewsCenter Now). It is unknown if the two services will be merged in any way or if one will be dropped. The station was upgraded to a 720p high definition signal on June 27.

On July 25, 2011, Nexstar Broadcasting filed an antitrust lawsuit against Granite Broadcasting, claiming the latter company tried to monopolize advertising sales through its shared services agreement with WPTA (owned by Malara Broadcast Group) and the five network affiliations that were shared between WPTA and WISE at the time. (WPTA already carried ABC and CW programming, while in addition to the Fox and MyNetworkTV programming on its second digital subchannel, NBC is carried on WISE-TV's primary channel). Nexstar sought a judgment that would force either WPTA or WISE-TV to give up at least one of the three Big Four affiliations it had. This lawsuit was settled on February 5, 2013, resulting in a reversal of the 2011 switch as Fox agreed to bring that network's local affiliation back to WFFT; Fox programming moved to WFFT from WISE-DT2 on March 1, with MyNetworkTV once again becoming the subchannel's sole network affiliation. The last Fox program to air on WISE-DT2 was American Idol on February 28.

== News operation ==
Although WISE-TV was the senior partner in the agreement, Granite moved the combined operation to WPTA's studios. Also, the combined operation's news staff consisted mainly of WPTA holdovers. As a result, 57 employees of WISE-TV (including both on-air personalities and production staff) were fired. Granite kept longtime weeknight anchor Linda Jackson to help smooth over the transition. (Jackson was promoted to morning anchor at WPTA in 2012; as of 2026, she remains there as an early evening co-anchor alongside former WANE anchor Heather Herron. Former sports reporter Kent Hormann later returned to WISE-TV as an anchor but is no longer in the industry.) Viewers did not react favorably and much of the negative feedback was given in "The Rant" section of The News-Sentinel where readers voiced their opinions. Many people were upset about the breakup of the news team especially the firing of meteorologist Greg Shoup. However, he was quickly hired by WANE-TV where he is currently the weekday morning and afternoon meteorologist. Until 2013, newscasts on WISE-TV were practically identical to those on WPTA, which adopted Indiana's NewsCenter as a news brand for both stations. When the stations upgraded to high definition in the fall of 2012, the INC brand was retired and WISE-TV simulcast WPTA newscasts in the interim. On March 4, 2013, WISE-TV began producing its own newscast format from a secondary set adjacent to the WPTA newsroom studio. Prior to the NBC affiliation moving to WPTA-DT2, WISE-TV aired the 6 a.m. hour of WOWO (1190 AM and 92.3 FM)'s morning show, Fort Wayne's Morning News, as well as its own newscasts at 4, 6, and 11 p.m. The station did not air midday or weekend newscasts; the 4:00 p.m. newscast was dropped shortly before the transition.

When Granite acquired WISE-TV in 2005, the station began airing a weeknight 7:00 p.m. newscast which was the first and only one in the state of Indiana. On September 11, 2006, this newscast was replaced with an extra episode of Dr. Phil due to low ratings. Starting back on July 24, WISE-TV began airing a weeknight 10 p.m. newscast on its second digital subchannel that was an affiliate of NBC Weather Plus. With the addition of "My TV Fort Wayne" on its second digital subchannel and "Fort Wayne's CW" on WPTA's second digital subchannel, the newscast moved over to those stations.

Quincy relaunched a slate of NBC affiliate-specific newscasts on WPTA-DT2 in the fall of 2016 from a new studio; this ended under Gray ownership in late 2022, and WPTA-DT2 has since simulcast the main subchannel's newscasts with no differentiation. After becoming a CW Plus affiliate, WISE-TV has aired no newscasts whatsoever.

=== Notable former on-air staff ===
- Dick Florea – news director and anchor in the 1970s and 1980s and Editor's Desk host
- Janette Luu – former anchor and reporter from 1998 to 2003
- Charles Pugh – former anchor and reporter

== Technical information ==
=== Subchannels ===
The station's signal is multiplexed:

Subchannels of WISE-TV
Subchannel	Res.	Short name	Programming
33.1	720p	WISECW	The CW Plus
33.2	480i	Justice	True Crime Network
33.3	480i	Grit	Grit
33.4	480i	CourtTV	Court TV
33.5	480i	Start	Start TV
33.6	720p	MeTV	MeTV
33.7	480i	DABL	Dabl

WISE-TV carried NBC Weather Plus on virtual channel 33.3 from 2006 until that network ceased operation on December 1, 2008.

=== Analog-to-digital conversion ===
WISE-TV shut down its analog signal, over UHF channel 33, on February 17, 2009, the original target date on which full-power television stations in the United States were to transition from analog to digital broadcasts under federal mandate (which was later pushed back to June 12, 2009). The station's digital signal remained on its pre-transition UHF channel 19, using virtual channel 33. WISE-TV eventually moved to digital channel 18. On August 31, 2018, WISE moved from digital channel 18 to channel 34 as part of phase zero of the repack, rather than the originally scheduled phase six of the repack.
