= WPTA =

Television station in Fort Wayne, Indiana

- Fort Wayne, Indiana; United States
- Channels: Digital: 24 (UHF); Virtual: 21
- Branding: 21Alive

Programming
- Affiliations: 21.1: ABC; 21.2: NBC; 21.3: Independent with MyNetworkTV

Ownership
- Owner: Gray Media; (Gray Television Licensee, LLC)
- Sister stations: WFFT-TV, WISE-TV

History
- First air date: September 28, 1957
- Former channel numbers: Analog: 21 (UHF, 1957–2009)
- Former affiliations: The WB (21.2, 1998–2006); The CW (21.2, 2006–2016)
- Call sign meaning: Patricia and Thomas Tarzian (children of Sarkes Tarzian)

Technical information
- Licensing authority: FCC
- Facility ID: 73905
- ERP: 444 kW; 266 kW (STA)
- HAAT: 228.6 m (750 ft); 206.4 m (677 ft) (STA)
- Transmitter coordinates: 41°6′7.6″N 85°11′3.6″W

Links
- Public license information: Public file; LMS
- Website: www.21alivenews.com

WPTA (channel 21) is a television station in Fort Wayne, Indiana, United States, affiliated with ABC, NBC, and MyNetworkTV. It is owned by Gray Media alongside CW+ affiliate WISE-TV (channel 33) and Fox affiliate WFFT-TV (channel 55). WPTA and WISE-TV share studios and transmitter facilities on Butler Road in Northwest Fort Wayne.

WPTA is popularly known within the Fort Wayne metropolitan area by its longtime on-air brand, 21 Alive, which the station has used from 1978 to 2016 and since 2022.

== History ==
The station first signed on the air on September 28, 1957. It was founded by Sarkes Tarzian, an Indianapolis engineer whose company owned Bloomington's WTTV and several other stations in Indiana. The WPTA call letters come from the long tradition of other Tarzian stations that base the call letters upon the initials of family members of company management—in this case, Tarzian's children, Patricia and Thomas. Upon its launch, channel 21 took all ABC programming from NBC affiliate WKJG-TV (channel 33, now WISE-TV) and CBS affiliate WANE-TV (channel 15).

Under Federal Communications Commission (FCC) rules at that time, the Fort Wayne market was deemed too small to support three full-power stations, so Tarzian's application listed WPTA's city of license as the small town of Roanoke, located just across the Allen–Huntington county line approximately 14 miles (23 km) to the southwest of its studios and transmitter in Fort Wayne. This was possible because the FCC had by this time allowed a station to have its main studio in a different location from its city of license. WPTA identified itself as "Roanoke–Fort Wayne" on-air until the license was officially transferred to Fort Wayne sometime in the 1970s. For this reason, when Tarzian signed on an FM radio sister station to channel 21, it took the calls WPTH; at the time, the FCC did not allow co-owned television and radio stations to share the same base call sign if they were licensed in different cities.

In addition to ABC programming, it also originally aired seven-and-a-half hours of live local programming each week. In 1957, the station aired a spin-off of American Bandstand called Teen Dance and the afternoon kids show Popeye and the Rascals. In 1964, a 2,226-square-foot (206.8 m^{2}) addition to its studios was added to accommodate an expanding sales staff. On April 4, 1973, Tarzian sold the station to Combined Communications for $3.6 million. Under new management, WPTA purchased new cameras and a more modern switcher. On June 7, 1979, Combined merged with the Gannett Company.

On May 12, 1983, Gannett sold WPTA (along with WLKY in Louisville, Kentucky) to Pulitzer Publishing for an undisclosed amount after it purchased WLVI in Boston from Field Communications and WTCN-TV (now KARE) in Minneapolis from Metromedia. This was because the WLVI and WTCN purchases put Gannett with two stations over the Federal Communications Commission's seven-station ownership limit for television stations that was in effect at the time. The station was sold again to Granite Broadcasting on September 25, 1989, for $22.15 million. In late-1998 alongside the launch of The WB 100+ and its cable-only affiliates, WPTA began managing and providing promotional services for WBFW, which used that callsign in a fictional manner since it was a cable-exclusive service.

When WSJV in South Bend (which signed on three years before WPTA) switched to Fox in 1995, WPTA became the longest-tenured ABC affiliate in Indiana. At one time (according to Granite Broadcasting's website), WPTA was among the ten strongest ABC affiliates in the country, ranking with WISN-TV in Milwaukee, KMBC-TV in Kansas City, and KOCO-TV in Oklahoma City.

On March 9, 2005, after Granite bought NBC affiliate WISE-TV, it sold WPTA to the Malara Broadcast Group for $45.3 million. A local marketing agreement (LMA) was established whereby Granite would provide operational services to WPTA and Malara's other new station KDLH in Duluth, Minnesota. Although WISE-TV was nominally the senior partner in this LMA, the combined operation was based at WPTA's studios and the bulk of the news staff were holdovers from WPTA (see below). Malara jointly filed its Securities and Exchange Commission (SEC) reports with Granite, which led to allegations that Granite used Malara as a shell corporation to evade FCC duopoly rules. The FCC does not allow common ownership of two of the four highest-rated stations in a single market. Additionally, Fort Wayne has only six full-power stations (only four of which are licensed as commercial outlets), which at the time were too few to legally allow duopolies in any case. (As of 2018, WPTA and WISE-TV are now jointly owned, as the latter was shown to be the fifth rated full-power station.) After emerging from bankruptcy in the summer of 2007, Granite stock was taken over by the privately owned hedge fund Silver Point Capital of Greenwich, Connecticut. Silver Point Capital now controls Granite according to a Buffalo, New York, news article printed September 16, 2007. According to the same article, Granite planned to sell its properties to other parties and many of its stations laid off employees or cut salaries up to 20 percent.

In March 2006, The CW (a new network being formed as a merger of The WB and UPN) announced that cable-only WB 100+ affiliate "WBFW" would become the network's Fort Wayne affiliate as part of The CW Plus (a similar small-market master feed to The WB 100+). WPTA decided to create a new second digital subchannel to simulcast "WBFW" and offer access to CW programming for over-the-air viewers. On September 18, The CW launched on WPTA-DT2. This move—along with WISE-DT2's switch to MyNetworkTV on September 5—resulted in the deactivation of WANE-TV's second digital subchannel. It had been affiliated with UPN prior to the network's shutdown (that subchannel remained dark until 2010, when it affiliated with TheCoolTV).

On September 28, 2007, WPTA unveiled a 3D version of its "21 Alive" logo to commemorate the station's 50th anniversary, in conjunction with ABC's new image campaign but did not fully switch to it until August 4, 2008. On January 10, 2009, WPTA brought a new digital master control center online which services the station, WISE-TV and Granite's other stations in the Midwest.

On February 11, 2014, Quincy Media agreed to purchase WPTA from the Malara Broadcast Group as part of a deal to purchase Granite Broadcasting's stations in four markets (the other stations were KBJR-TV in Superior, Wisconsin, and its satellite KRII in Chisholm, Minnesota, WEEK-TV in Peoria, Illinois, and WBNG-TV in Binghamton, New York). Quincy opted to purchase WPTA's license instead of WISE's license because WPTA has been the higher-rated of the two stations in the local viewership ratings. In addition to acquiring WPTA outright (which would make it the senior partner in the Fort Wayne duopoly), Quincy Newspapers would operate WISE-TV (whose license would be acquired by SagamoreHill Broadcasting) through a shared services agreement. In November 2014, the deal was reworked to remove SagamoreHill from the transaction, with Quincy acquiring WISE, and WPTA remaining with Malara.

In July 2015, the deal was reworked yet again; it reverted to its previous structure, with Quincy and SagamoreHill acquiring WPTA and WISE respectively. However, it also called for the SSA to be wound down within nine months of the acquisition's closure. On September 15, 2015, the FCC approved the deal, which was completed on November 2. On August 1, 2016, as a result of the end of the SSA, NBC and MyNetworkTV programming previously seen on WISE moved to subchannels of WPTA, and The CW moved to WISE, which became independently operated by SagamoreHill Broadcasting without entering into any further operational agreements with Quincy. However, Quincy reacquired WISE outright in 2018, which reunited the two stations under common ownership.

In a YouTube post on October 19, 2016, WPTA announced it would re-brand as "ABC21" on November 7. With the rebranding under Quincy Media ownership, WPTA retired the "Alive" brand after 38 years. During the "21Alive" era, local newscasts on WPTA were titled 21Alive Newsroom, 21Alive News, and Indiana's NewsCenter. In 2021, Gray Media purchased all of Quincy's television properties, including WPTA and WISE-TV. On October 17, 2022, the station returned to the "21Alive" brand ahead of a planned reconsolidation of its news product across all of its subchannels under Gray ownership presumably as the "21Alive" brand was so well established in Fort Wayne that viewer outcry from 2016 to 2022 allowed Gray ownership to revive the brand; even so, the "21 Alive" brand was not fully restored until 2022, when the 21 Alive News title was restored for its newscasts (which were retitled ABC 21 News with the removal of the "21 Alive" brand) yet by April 2023, retained the "ABC 21" brand that is used in promos as seen somewhat as a compromise.

Since 2023, WPTA's third subchannel has served as the local broadcast home of the Fort Wayne TinCaps, the High-A affiliate of the San Diego Padres.

WPTA and WISE-TV gained a new sister station in the market when Gray acquired WFFT-TV on May 1, 2026; as part of the deal, Gray committed to divest WISE-TV within two years.

== News operation ==
=== Main channel (21Alive – ABC) ===
WPTA presently broadcasts 29 hours of locally produced newscasts each week (with five hours each weekday and two hours each on Saturdays and Sundays); in addition, the station also produces the sports highlight program The Score, which airs Friday nights. While WPTA has a weather radar dating back to the late 1990s on its premises, it has used NEXRAD data exclusively since 2007, first with Baron Systems' VIPIR processing under the name Pinpoint VIPIR HD, then from 2016 onwards with The Weather Company's Max Radar as a result of the station's acquisition by Quincy.

Under Combined Communications ownership, WPTA significantly invested in its news department. During that time, Wes Sims and Harry Gallagher served as co-anchors with meteorologist Bill Eisenhood and sports anchor Tom Campbell. In July 1978, WPTA replaced the Eyewitness News format for its newscasts with the "Alive" (as "21 Alive") format, originating from a studio doubling as the station's newsroom; WXIA-TV in Atlanta is another former Combined station that currently uses the "Alive" brand, though it abandoned the open newsroom concept in the early 1980s. In the summer of 1984, the station received its first live truck to assist in news production.

After being taken over by Granite, WISE-TV's news department was promptly folded and combined with WPTA. The company fired most of WISE-TV's news staff, with the exception of lead anchor Linda Jackson, who became part of the WPTA operation and would eventually become morning co-anchor on WPTA. That station began airing a weeknight newscast at 7 p.m. which was the first and only one in the state of Indiana at the time. On September 11, 2006, this was replaced due to low ratings with an additional episode of Dr. Phil. In November 2005, after several months of using the "Alive" news brand on both stations, WPTA debuted a new set in its second studio formerly used to tape public-affairs programs such as Impact. With it came a new branding for the newscasts, Indiana's NewsCenter.

When WPTA took over news production for WISE-TV, there was a significant decrease in ratings initially. WANE-TV became the market's news leader for several years after that, according to Nielsen Media Research, since it was the only other local news operation in the area at the time. This was most easily attributed to continued viewer resentment towards WPTA and Granite for the elimination of WISE-TV's news department and arguably its identity and history. However, WPTA management said the changes were part of a longer-term plan that would need up to five years to take hold with viewers. Part of the plan to win back viewers included new technology such as text messaging, an improved website with more online video, and upgrading weather equipment to a VIPIR system.

Eventually, the changes started to take hold and ratings began to improve. In the November 2007 sweeps period, WPTA and WANE-TV were nearly neck-and-neck in the Fort Wayne television news ratings race with WANE-TV continuing to show a slight lead. On July 24, 2006, WISE-TV began airing a weeknight prime time newscast at 10 p.m. for a half-hour on its NBC Weather Plus subchannel. With the September 2006 change to MyNetworkTV on WISE-DT2 and the addition of The CW on WPTA's second digital subchannel, the show (known as Indiana's NewsCenter Prime News) became part of those channel's schedules through a simulcast. On May 18, 2009, WPTA and WISE-TV became the first two stations in Fort Wayne to air local newscasts in 16:9 aspect ratio.

In September 2009, Granite began producing a pre-recorded weeknight prime time newscast at 10 p.m. on sister MyNetworkTV affiliate WMYD in Detroit, replacing a similar production by the Independent News Network The broadcast featured news anchor Melissa Long, chief meteorologist Curtis Smith, sports director Dean Pantazi, and a group of Detroit-based reporters. The co-production was established after the Butler Road facilities became a master control hub for Granite's Midwestern stations. The newscast was discontinued and taken in-house following the sale of WMYD to the owners of local ABC affiliate WXYZ.

During the Indiana's NewsCenter era, WPTA co-produced newscasts with WISE-TV that were essentially the same in terms of coverage and format. Shows simulcast on both stations included weekday morning (except for the 5 a.m. half-hour on WPTA), weeknight 6 p.m. and weekend newscasts. WPTA aired separate weekday noon and weeknight 5 p.m., 5:30 p.m. and 11 p.m. newscasts. WISE-TV did not air newscasts on weeknights at 5 and 5:30 p.m. unlike most NBC affiliates in the Eastern Time Zone. For a time, WISE-DT2 offered rebroadcasts of the entire weekday morning (at 7 a.m.), noon (at 1 p.m.) and weeknight 6 p.m. (at 6:30 p.m.) newscasts.

On October 14, 2012, at 11 p.m., WPTA began broadcasting its newscasts in high definition. With this, newscasts on the station returned to the 21 Alive News brand. WPTA and WISE-TV continued to simulcast newscasts under respective titles until March 4, 2013, when the latter station began airing its own newscasts with a separate news team. News resources such as video footage continue to be shared between the two stations. Parts of the Indiana's NewsCenter brand remained in use over the next two years, including the station's website, INCnow.tv; in October 2014, WPTA changed its web address to 21alive.com, with the website now prominently displaying the two stations' logos.

In a presentation submitted to the FCC in August 2014, Quincy said that its plans for WPTA and WISE-TV include the construction of a new studio facility at the WPTA site, after which both stations would produce competing live newscasts and maintain separate websites. This plan was effectively maintained after the decision to transfer WISE-TV's NBC affiliation to WPTA-DT2, for which Quincy will produce a separate news product from that of the main channel. Construction on an addition to the WPTA studios commenced in the spring of 2016, and Quincy subsequently posted job listings for news personnel. Quincy said in a statement that WPTA would become the largest news operation in its stable.

The addition would become known on-air as "Television Park". This includes two studio spaces with matching control rooms at opposing ends of a larger newsroom shared by the WPTA-ABC and WPTA-NBC news teams. Built by the FX Group, WPTA's new set was rolled out to Quincy stations WREX, KBJR-TV, KWWL, WEEK-TV and WKOW later in the year. The former "Indiana's NewsCenter" studio was set to be converted to a work space for the station's production department.

In the months following Quincy's acquisition of WPTA, several popular on-air personalities left the station. Evening anchor Melissa Long retired after 23 years at the end of 2015; within months, chief meteorologist Curtis Smith and sports director Tommy Schoegler took positions at Parkview Health after 21 and 13 years respectively, breaking up what had mostly been a static anchor team about for a decade. In July 2016, WISE-TV weather specialist Katie Law also left for Parkview. Late that month, two anchors from South Bend sister station WSJV were transferred to WPTA for its impending newscasts on the NBC subchannel. This came as WSJV's news operation wound down due to Quincy trading its Fox affiliation for Sinclair's ABC and CW affiliations in Peoria. In September, amid further changes to WPTA's anchor teams, former WSJV reporter Alexis Gray began as evening co-anchor and Leach returned to the station as chief meteorologist.

WPTA relaunched its newscasts as ABC21 News on November 7, 2016, from its new facilities, marking the end of the 21 Alive brand after 38 years. It soon brought on board a fourth meteorologist, a first for the station, which now uses the slogan "Your Weather Authority". ABC21 became the first station in northeastern Indiana to begin morning news at 4:30 a.m. and added four hours of weekend morning news to its programming slate. With the relaunch of a full slate of newscasts on WPTA-DT2 on November 21, 2016, a total of 50 1/2 hours per week of news content aired on WPTA channels 21.1 and 21.2. The Indiana's NewsCenter brand was abandoned with the relaunch of newscasts on 21.1 and 21.2.

On November 3, 2017, WPTA's ABC21 was named Station of the Year in Region 2 (stations outside of Indianapolis) at the Indiana Broadcasters Association Spectrum Awards banquet. In 2018, channel honors included two Regional Edward R. Murrow Awards, Emmy nominations including Overall Excellence and News Excellence and statewide honors including Outstanding News Operation (from the Indiana Associated Press Broadcasters Association) and Best Newscast (from the Society of Professional Journalists). In 2019, ABC21 received another Regional Edward R. Murrow Award, which qualified the station for the national competition. "Digging Deeper: Dying on the Job", a series of reports focused on workplace safety in Indiana, then received the National Edward R. Murrow Award for Investigative Reporting. The station was again nominated for the News Excellence Emmy and won the award in the categories of Evening Newscast and Investigative Reporting (series). Additional honors included a third place National Headliner Award and a repeat of the statewide Outstanding News Operation honor (from IAPBA). The channel's "ABC21 Storm Team" was named "Outstanding Weather Operation" and the 11 p.m. news received another statewide Best Newscast award.

Following Gray's acquisition of the station, its main newscasts were rebranded back to 21Alive News on October 17, 2022. In November, the station announced plans to consolidate its news departments under the same brand and add additional newscasts.

=== WPTA-DT2 (NBC21) ===
With the September 2006 affiliation switch to MyNetworkTV on WISE-DT2 and the addition of CW programming on WPTA's second digital subchannel, the former subchannel's prime time newscast (known as Indiana's NewsCenter Prime News)—which had earlier launched on July 24, 2006, on WISE-DT2—began to be simulcast on WPTA-DT2. The simulcast of the half-hour 10 p.m. newscast was dropped in September 2011, replaced by syndicated programming supplied by the national CW Plus feed.

Logo as Fort Wayne's CW 19/7 on DT2 until 2016 swapping from NBC to move from its second subchannel and The CW move to WISE-TV.

When WPTA-DT2 assumed the program stream formerly aired by WISE-TV, it initially continued WISE's preexisting 6 and 11 p.m. newscasts under the "NBC33 News" name, although on-air personnel took to using the new "Fort Wayne's NBC" name. On November 21, 2016, Quincy relaunched its newscasts for the Fort Wayne operation, having transferred two anchors from its shuttered WSJV operation as well as Linda Jackson and meteorologist Chris Daniels from sister channel WPTA/ABC21's morning newscasts to make up the evening anchor team on WPTA-DT2. Additional hires were made, and the channel began broadcasting a slate of live newscasts seven days a week.

In 2019, "Fort Wayne's NBC" received the Lower Great Lakes region Emmy Award for Overall Excellence—one of two Emmy wins and four nominations in total. The channel also received its first Regional Edward R. Murrow Award, in the documentary category, and collected several statewide honors, including the Society of Professional Journalists award for "Best Newscast". At the annual Indiana Broadcasters Association convention that year, Fort Wayne's NBC received the "Station of the Year" Spectrum Award.

On October 17, 2022, following Gray's acquisition of the station, WPTA-DT2 began simulcasting the main subchannel's morning newscasts in place of producing its own. In November 2022, WPTA announced that, as part of a reconsolidation of its entire news product under the revived 21Alive News brand, the evening Fort Wayne's NBC newscasts would end on December 16, 2022, after which most of its anchors and weather staff were reassigned. On January 9, 2023, WPTA fully completed its reorganization of newscasts, with WPTA-DT2 simulcasting morning, 6 p.m. and 11 p.m. newscasts on weekdays.

=== WPTA-DT3 (MyTV Fort Wayne) ===
On July 24, 2006, WISE-TV began to produce a prime time newscast at 10 p.m. for the subchannel. Known on-air as Indiana's NewsCenter Prime News, the 30-minute weeknight program preempted regular NBC Weather Plus programming normally seen in the timeslot. It began to be simulcast on WPTA-DT2 when that subchannel launched as a CW affiliate that September. As a MyNetworkTV outlet, WISE-DT2 began to air repeats of its parent station's weekday morning newscast at 7 a.m., WPTA's midday newscast (at 1 p.m.), and the weeknight 6 p.m. broadcast at 6:30 p.m. Although WISE-TV and WPTA became the only stations in Fort Wayne to upgrade their local newscasts to 16:9 widescreen enhanced definition on May 18, 2009, all newscasts seen on WISE-DT2 remained in pillarboxed 4:3 standard definition.

After WISE-DT2 joined Fox, Indiana's NewsCenter Prime News was upgraded to widescreen SD. WPTA-DT2's simulcast of that program as well as the repeats of local newscasts from WISE and WPTA on WISE-DT2's schedule were dropped at some point in the fall of 2011. Corresponding with WISE-TV and WPTA further upgrading to full HD newscasts, the prime time newscast on the subchannel was relaunched as MyFox Fort Wayne News at 10 on October 14, 2012, and began originating from a new secondary set. The program also introduced an updated graphics package and news music package that is separate from the on-air presentation of the main WISE-TV channel's local news programs. The broadcast continued to air only weeknights for a half-hour. On February 5, 2013, following the announcement that Fox programming would move back to WFFT on March 1, the 10 p.m. newscast was canceled. On March 4, 2013, WISE-TV began newscasts at 4, 6 and 11 p.m. that effectively revived the format used on the WISE-DT2 newscast.

Upon Quincy's acquisition of the station in 2016, WPTA transferred WISE-TV's NBC affiliation to WPTA-DT2 and its MyNetworkTV affiliation to a new third subchannel, in exchange for WISE-TV becoming a primary CW+ affiliate. The current MyTV subchannel WPTA-DT3 did not air regular newscasts until January 2023, when WPTA began airing an extension of its morning news from 7 to 9 a.m. The following September, the station replaced a simulcast of WOWO's morning news on WPTA-DT3 with its own in the 5-7 a.m. slot.

=== Notable former on-air staff ===
- Janette Luu – weekend news anchor/reporter (until 2005)

== Technical information ==
=== Subchannels ===
The station's signal is multiplexed:

Subchannels of WPTA
Subchannel	Res.	Short name	Programming
21.1	720p	WPTAABC	ABC
21.2	1080i	WPTANBC	NBC
21.3	720p	WPTAMY	Independent with MyNetworkTV

=== Analog-to-digital conversion ===
WPTA shut down its analog signal, over UHF channel 21, on February 17, 2009, the original target date on which full-power television stations in the United States were to transition from analog to digital broadcasts under federal mandate (which was later pushed back to June 12, 2009). The station's digital signal remained on its pre-transition UHF channel 24, using virtual channel 21.

== See also ==
- Channel 21 virtual TV stations in the United States
- Channel 24 digital TV stations in the United States
