= WFFT-TV =

Television station in Fort Wayne, Indiana

- Fort Wayne, Indiana; United States
- Channels: Digital: 20 (UHF); Virtual: 55
- Branding: Fox 55

Programming
- Affiliations: 55.1: Fox; for others, see § Subchannels

Ownership
- Owner: Gray Media; (Gray Television Licensee, LLC)
- Sister stations: WPTA, WISE-TV

History
- First air date: December 21, 1977
- Former channel numbers: Analog: 55 (UHF, 1977–2009); Digital: 36 (UHF, 2003–2019)
- Former affiliations: Independent (1977–1986, 2011–2013); UPN (secondary, 1995–2003)
- Call sign meaning: "Fifty-Five Television"

Technical information
- Licensing authority: FCC
- Facility ID: 25040
- ERP: 550 kW
- HAAT: 239.9 m (787 ft)
- Transmitter coordinates: 41°6′33.4″N 85°11′42.2″W

Links
- Public license information: Public file; LMS
- Website: www.21alivenews.com

WFFT-TV (channel 55) is a television station in Fort Wayne, Indiana, United States, affiliated with the Fox network. It is owned by Gray Media alongside ABC/NBC affiliate WPTA (channel 21) and CW affiliate WISE-TV (channel 33). WFFT-TV's studios and transmitter facilities are located on Hillegas Road in Fort Wayne.

== History ==
=== As an independent station ===
WFFT-TV signed on the air on December 21, 1977, as an independent station. Many shows on the station during its early days had not been seen in the market since their original airing on network television; among the classic series it aired were The Little Rascals, Superman, Batman, Battlestar Galactica, Star Trek, Night Gallery, The Wild Wild West and McHale's Navy. For a time, the station carried ABC shows that were preempted by WPTA (channel 21), which usually included shows that were part of the ABC Late Night block.

=== Innovations ===
In January 1978, just one month after it signed on, the Midwestern United States suffered through a snowstorm known as the "Great Blizzard of 1978". Due to the severity of the storm, engineers were trapped at the station, and rather than sign off the air as they normally would, they got permission from management to simply continue transmitting. They filled the time with information about the weather situation (to the degree that they could given their limited resources), and public domain films and videos from the station's library. The appeal of 24-hour broadcasting was so popular that it later ended up staying on the air all night each Friday and Saturday on a regular basis during a time when the other Fort Wayne stations would sign-off around 1 or 2 a.m.; it filled the overnight timeslot with a feature film showcase called Nite Owl Theatre, which began with the opening refrain of "(I've Been) Searchin' So Long" by Chicago as its theme music.

In later years, Friday late nights featured classic horror movies such as: Frankenstein, Dracula, The Wolfman, The Mole People and Invasion of the Body Snatchers hosted by a character called "The Shroud" on Nightmare Theatre (of which only one episode is currently known to exist). The station provided a much-needed alternative to viewers in the Fort Wayne area (particularly younger viewers) with its array of cartoons, movies, and old sitcoms. This was especially important for those who did not have cable and could not watch regional or national superstations such as WTTV from Indianapolis or WGN-TV from Chicago.

At one time, WFFT was voted the #1 independent station in the United States, a feat that was especially remarkable since Fort Wayne was one of the smallest markets in the country at the time to have an independent station. Beginning in 1982, the station carried programming from CNN Headline News during various parts of the day, including the overnight hours on weekdays. It also provided some coverage of local events such as the Three Rivers Festival. The station served as the official Fort Wayne outlet for Chicago Cubs baseball.

=== Local children's programming ===
Happy's Place was an afternoon children's television program that aired on WFFT-TV in the 1980s and 1990s. The program was known for its two-hour block of children's programming that initially aired from 3 to 5 p.m. and included DuckTales, Inspector Gadget, The Smurfs, He-Man, Saber Rider and G.I. Joe. The show was based on an original program called Happy's Hour, that had begun broadcasting on WTVQ, channel 62, in Lexington, Kentucky in 1976. On it, Tim Eppenstein played the character of Happy, and Mike McMellon provided the voice of Froggie. Parents had a place to sit on the side and were not shown to be part of the TV audience. During commercial breaks, local entrepreneur Mike Fry donned a hobo clown costume to entertain the children in the audience.

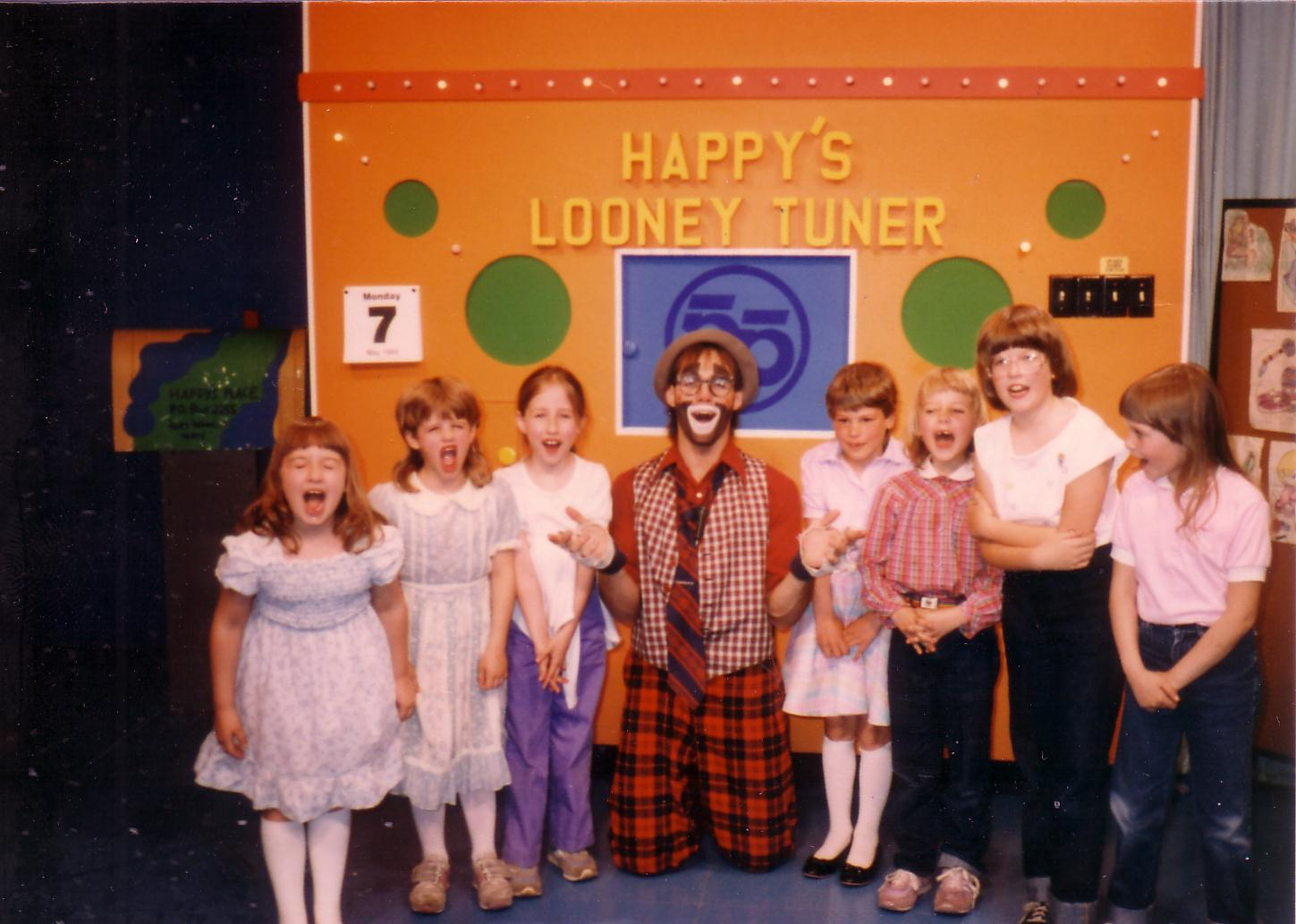
Kids with Mike Fry as Happy, on the set of Happy's Place in 1984

In the early 1980s, WFFT planned a similar show for the Ft. Wayne market. A local clown, 'Chuckles', played by Charles Willer, turned down the Happy part when the station asked him to retire his other character as a condition of employment. Fry was then hired to play the part of Happy. He also had a raspy-voiced sidekick named 'Froggie,' a frog puppet voiced by Craig Beaverson. (Note: Froggie/Beaverson had his own morning program on WFFT, entitled Froggie's Pad. Froggie's Pad featured children's cartoons such as ThunderCats and SilverHawks.) Characters 'Chester T. Fox' (Paul Moring) and 'Lawn Boy' (Rick Miller) were added later. Fry left the show in 1990 to concentrate on his business interests, and the role of Happy was filled by Phillip Colglazier. (Note: Chris Danielson, dressed in the same Happy the hobo apparel, had temporarily taken over the role in 1988 when Fry had knee surgery.)

In the mid-to-late 1990s, amidst the station's shift away from programming that was produced locally at its studios, the Happy's Place program was retooled. Segments were taped on location (and sometimes even in transit) and featured area attractions such as the Fort Wayne Children's Zoo. This format did not last long and the show was eventually canceled.

=== Joining, leaving and rejoining Fox ===
WFFT became a charter affiliate of Fox at the network's launch on October 9, 1986, and was branded as "Super 55 Fox" in the early to mid 1990s; the station was carried on cable providers in the southeastern portion of the South Bend market during that time, as that region lacked a Fox affiliate until WSJV affiliated with network in October 1995. The station moved away from local productions in the mid-1990s. WFFT's programming—apart from the required Fox schedule—was centered around syndicated fare including daytime talk and court shows, and reruns of network sitcoms. After the launch of UPN on January 16, 1995, WFFT began carrying the fledgling network through a secondary affiliation. The network's programming eventually moved to CBS affiliate WANE-TV (channel 15) full-time on a new second digital subchannel by the mid-2000s; when UPN and rival netlet The WB were shut down to form a combined network in 2006, WPTA gained the resulting CW+ affiliation for its own subchannel. WFFT changed its on-air branding from "Fox 55" to "Fox Fort Wayne" on January 1, 2008, to reflect its various cable channel positions in the market.

Fox announced on June 20, 2011, that it would end its affiliation with WFFT and sister station KSFX-TV (now KOZL-TV) in Springfield, Missouri; its Fort Wayne affiliation moved to MyNetworkTV affiliate WISE-DT2 on August 1. Nexstar had earlier lost the Fox affiliation for WTVW in Evansville, Indiana, following a dispute with the network over retransmission consent fees that it wanted its stations to pay to the network. WFFT, along with WXIN in Indianapolis, had been the longest-tenured Fox affiliates in Indiana (Nexstar later voluntarily disaffiliated another Indiana station, WFXW—now WAWV-TV—in Terre Haute, from Fox in favor of switching the station's affiliation back to ABC, the network it was affiliated with until 1995).

On July 25, 2011, Nexstar Broadcasting filed an antitrust lawsuit against Granite Broadcasting, claiming that the company tried to monopolize advertising sales through its shared services agreement with WPTA (owned by Malara Broadcast Group) and the five network affiliations shared between WPTA and WISE-TV (WPTA carries ABC on its primary channel and The CW on a second digital subchannel, while WISE-TV carried NBC on its primary channel as Fox and MyNetworkTV shared that station's second digital subchannel). Nexstar sought a judgment to force either WPTA-TV or WISE-TV to give up at least one of the three Big Four affiliations they had (the impetus of the lawsuit became ironic as Nexstar, which itself maintains outsourcing agreements with stations it does not own outright in most of the markets where it does own a TV outlet, later created a virtual quadropoly composed of four network-affiliated stations in Little Rock, Arkansas, through its 2012 acquisition of 15 stations from Newport Television).

WFFT reverted to independent status on August 1, 2011, which made Fort Wayne one of the only television markets in the United States with all three legacy broadcast networks (ABC, CBS and NBC) with primary affiliations, and all three current post-1986 networks (Fox, The CW and MyNetworkTV) carried as digital multicast channels in a market with four commercial full-power stations. As an independent, the station filled its prime time schedule with a mix of entertainment newsmagazines and sitcoms on weeknights, a two-hour "Saturday Crimetime" block of police procedural series on Saturdays and family movies on Sundays. On February 6, 2013, as part of a settlement of Nexstar's lawsuit against Granite, the company announced that the Fox affiliation would return to WFFT; the switch was effectively reversed on March 1, 2013, making WFFT the only former Fox affiliate owned or managed by Nexstar that was affected by the 2011 dispute with Fox to rejoin the network. The first Fox program to air on WFFT when it rejoined the network was an episode of Kitchen Nightmares.

Nexstar announced on June 13, 2016, that it would sell WFFT-TV and four other stations to Heartland Media, through its USA Television MidAmerica Holdings joint venture with MSouth Equity Partners, for $115 million. The sale was required as part of Nexstar's planned merger with Media General to comply with Federal Communications Commission (FCC) ownership caps; Media General was the owner of rival WANE-TV. In early March 2018, the station removed the "Local" branding originated during its Nexstar ownership and independent period, returning to the previous "Fox 55" branding.

On October 1, 2019, Allen Media Group agreed to purchase 11 stations, including WFFT-TV, from Heartland Media for $290 million. The sale was approved by the FCC on November 22, 2019, and was completed on February 11, 2020.

On June 1, 2025, amid financial woes and rising debt, Allen Media Group announced that it would explore "strategic options" for the company, such as a sale of its television stations (including WFFT). On August 8, 2025, it was announced that AMG would sell 10 of its stations, including WFFT, to Gray Media for $171 million; in the Fort Wayne market, this would create a triopoly with WPTA and WISE. The sale was completed on May 1, 2026, with Gray committing to divest WISE within two years.

== News operation ==
As of August 2026, news programming on WFFT is produced by WPTA's 21Alive News operation. WFFT broadcasts 29 1/2 hours of newscasts each week (with 5 1/2 hours each weekday and one hour each on Saturday and Sunday mornings). Exclusive to WFFT are a two-hour newscast at 7 a.m. (during which Good Morning America and Today respectively air on WPTA's ABC and NBC subchannels), a half-hour newscast at 6:30 p.m., and a one-hour newscast at 10 p.m., all on weekdays.

For most of the station's history, WFFT did not have a regular newscast. In 1980, it formed its initial news department and aired a half-hour prime time news program known as The 10 O'Clock Report; this was established during a time of heavy competition from other newscasts. As an independent, WFFT did not have network shows that could lead into its newscast, so consistent viewership and ratings were difficult to maintain. The news team consisted of only five people, and personnel would shoot and edit their own video. After that broadcast's cancellation a year later, WFFT delivered news bulletins in prime time for almost two decades.

On April 6, 2009, the station launched its second news operation and prime time broadcast known as Fox Fort Wayne News First at 10 (later Fox 55 News First at 10 after March 2018). It was the last Fox affiliate in Indiana to launch a news department, but the only local affiliate in the country to launch a new newscast in 2009. Airing for 35 minutes on weeknights and anchored by broadcast veteran Jim Blue, the show competed with a half-hour 10 p.m. newscast on WISE-DT2 that was produced by WPTA and WISE-TV's Indiana's NewsCenter operation. As with the 1980 production, personnel served as multi-platform journalists, shooting and editing their own stories. There was no sports department until the newscast's expansion following the loss of the Fox affiliation. The newscast was the only one in Fort Wayne to receive an Emmy Award nomination for "Best Evening Newscast" from the National Academy of Television Arts and Sciences-Lower Great Lakes Chapter that year.

When the station became an independent on August 1, 2011, WFFT expanded the 10 p.m. newscast to one hour; the newscast then expanded to weekend evenings on October 1, 2011 (also running for one hour); the Thursday preceding the latter expansion (September 29), WFFT became the first television station in the Fort Wayne market to begin broadcasting its local newscasts in high definition.

Blue eventually left WFFT, returning to WNWO-TV in Toledo, Ohio. Dan Ball took over as the news director following Blue's departure after a turbulent departure from KSNV-TV in March 2012. Ball was the news director from January 2013 until leaving two years later in January 2015 for KMIR-TV in Palm Springs, California. Audra Streetman temporarily took over as the main news anchor before leaving in May 2015 to also join KMIR-TV. Streetman and Blue then co-anchored the 5–7 a.m. morning show.

Former logo from 2018 to 2025.

On February 13, 2023, WFFT began airing hour-long 5 p.m. and 6 p.m. local newscasts, marking the news department's first expansion in over a decade.

On January 17, 2025, Allen Media Group announced plans to cut local meteorologist/weather forecaster positions from its stations, including WFFT, and replacing them with a "weather hub" produced by The Weather Channel, which AMG also owns.

Through most of 2025, as part of Allen's attempt at consolidation, portions of WFFT's newscasts not relating to local stories were produced out of then-sister station WLFI-TV in Lafayette; this also affected WTHI-TV in Terre Haute. Midday and weekend newscasts were entirely WLFI productions including reports from WFFT and WTHI under the title Indiana News Now. By the end of the year, WFFT and WTHI had returned to producing newscasts entirely in-house with the exception of Weather Channel forecasts.

Upon purchasing WFFT, Gray did not immediately make major changes to the news operation. In the comprehensive exhibit submitted alongside an authorization of assignment to the FCC upon agreeing to purchase several Allen stations, Gray did not explicitly state that it would shut down WFFT's own news operation in consolidation with WPTA, but cited a finding by the FCC's Office of Economics and Analytics that TV markets between 70,000 and 310,000 households—of which Fort Wayne is one—were incapable of supporting more than two news operations, and pledged to "increase" local news programming by airing newscasts in time slots outside of direct competition with other stations, "anchored by award-winning career journalists who will partner with experienced producers, reporters, photographers, and editors to bring a quality news product to viewers in Ft. Wayne."

On August 3, 2026, the WFFT website was deleted and redirected to that of WPTA, which announced that the WFFT news department was merging into 21Alive News, claiming that this would add 20 hours of news programming per week on WFFT, "including brand-new exclusive morning and early evening shows". (Shortly before this, remaining WFFT anchor-reporters began appearing on WPTA's newscasts, and WPTA news/weather promos began to be seen on WFFT.) During a two-week transition, WFFT continued to produce newscasts in-house with its own anchors, but featuring the same local reports as seen on WPTA and including 21Alive branding. Likewise, the station discontinued the use of Weather Channel meteorologists; for one week, WPTA weather staff delivered prerecorded forecasts, then in the final week, WFFT's own reporter-meteorologist presented weather in-studio. WFFT's 11 p.m. newscast on August 14 was its last; two of the remaining three on-air staff were retained as an anchor and a meteorologist, respectively.

== Technical information ==
=== Subchannels ===
The station's signal is multiplexed:

Subchannels of WFFT-TV
Subchannel	Res.	Short name	Programming
55.1	720p	WFFT-TV	Fox
55.2	480i	Bounce	Bounce TV
55.3	480i	Antenna	Antenna TV

=== Analog-to-digital conversion ===
WFFT began broadcasting its digital signal on UHF channel 36 in 2003. Until December 2007, the signal transmitted programming only in standard definition at an effective radiated power of 980 watts limiting reception to within miles of the station. In May 2009, the digital signal was upgraded to full power. It now broadcasts high definition programming in the 720p format, although it aired in 1080i between leaving and rejoining the Fox network.

WFFT shut down its analog signal, over UHF channel 55, at 6:01 p.m. on June 12, 2009, the official date on which full-power television stations in the United States transitioned from analog to digital broadcasts under federal mandate. The station's digital signal remained on its pre-transition UHF channel 36, using virtual channel 55.

On January 1, 2014, WFFT began carrying Bounce TV on a newly created digital subchannel 55.2.

On March 19, 2018, WFFT began carrying Antenna TV on digital channel 55.3. The network was previously seen on WANE-DT2 from 2011 to 2017.

== Out-of-market carriage and removal from out-of-market cable providers ==
As of March 2012, WFFT is only available over-the-air in Grant County. Despite this, WFFT was formerly carried by Bright House Networks in Marion, along with WXIN.

From January 2009 until WFFT's signal was removed by Bright House Networks systems in Grant County in March 2012, the station and WFWA remained on the cable system as well as Comcast in Blackford County (both with WXIN in-market). This was due to contractual agreements by the Fox network itself which disallow signal duplication of network programming by an out-of-market signal despite the station's longtime service to each area, a source of controversy already in other duplicative market areas in the past, as was the case in October 2008 when WANE-TV was pulled from Bright House.

WFFT, and all other Fort Wayne television stations, also have had their coverage in Ohio limited to Paulding County and Van Wert County since about 2000 due to the presence of network-affiliated stations in Lima, Ohio, as well as Dayton and Toledo.
