= WANE-TV =

Television station in Fort Wayne, Indiana

- Fort Wayne, Indiana; United States
- Channels: Digital: 32 (UHF); Virtual: 15
- Branding: WANE 15 (pronounced "Wayne")

Programming
- Affiliations: 15.1: CBS; for others, see § Subchannels

Ownership
- Owner: Nexstar Media Group; (Nexstar Media Inc.)

History
- First air date: September 26, 1954
- Former call signs: WINT (1954–1956)
- Former channel numbers: Analog: 15 (UHF, 1954–2009); Digital: 4 (VHF, 2001–2002), 31 (UHF, 2002–2019)
- Former affiliations: ABC (secondary, 1954–1957); NTA (secondary, 1956–1961); UPN (DT2, 2003–2006)
- Call sign meaning: Fort Wayne

Technical information
- Licensing authority: FCC
- Facility ID: 39270
- ERP: 1,000 kW
- HAAT: 244.6 m (802 ft)
- Transmitter coordinates: 41°5′38″N 85°10′48″W

Links
- Public license information: Public file; LMS
- Website: www.wane.com

WANE-TV (channel 15) is a television station in Fort Wayne, Indiana, United States, affiliated with CBS and owned by Nexstar Media Group. The station's studios and transmitter are located on West State Boulevard in the Tower Heights section of the city.

== History ==
The station signed on the air on September 26, 1954, as WINT, originally owned by Tri-State Television and broadcasting from a transmitter in Auburn. While it was the Fort Wayne area's second television station, it was originally licensed to, and had studios in, Waterloo, north of the city; it identified with both cities, "Waterloo/Fort Wayne", during this time.

The Indiana Broadcasting Company, owner of WISH-TV in Indianapolis and WANE radio (1450 AM, now WIOE), purchased WINT in 1956. The new owners changed the station's call letters to WANE-TV, reflecting its co-owned radio station, and moved all of channel 15's operations, as well as the license, to Fort Wayne. The analog transmitter remained at its rural Auburn location until 1957. Indiana Broadcasting became known as the Corinthian Broadcasting Company in 1957. From that point until 2019, WANE-TV and WISH-TV have become close sister stations; from 1997 until 2012, the two stations used the same news themes. The stations shared resources, which allowed WANE to use WISH-TV's resources for breaking news, live events and sports coverage. As of September 2019, WANE-TV is a sister operation with Indianapolis stations WTTV/WXIN under Nexstar ownership.

The station has always been a CBS affiliate, but also maintained a secondary affiliation with ABC until WPTA (channel 21) signed on in September 1957. During the late-1950s, WANE-TV was also briefly affiliated with the NTA Film Network. The station produced local programming shows such as The Ann Colone Show, a mid-afternoon talk and variety program. WANE radio was sold off in 1966.

Corinthian was purchased by Dun & Bradstreet in 1970 which in turn sold the station to the Belo Corporation in 1983. However, WANE left Belo with two stations over the FCC's television station ownership limit at the time, so the company sold WANE and WISH to LIN Broadcasting. In September 1999, WANE-TV acquired the local rights to Jeopardy! and Wheel of Fortune from NBC affiliate WKJG-TV, which had run both programs starting in September 1990.

After the launch of UPN on January 16, 1995, Fox affiliate WFFT (channel 55) began a secondary affiliation with the fledgling network. The network's programming eventually moved to WANE-TV full-time in 2003 after it launched a new digital subchannel. WANE-DT2 also featured repeats of newscasts seen on the main channel as well as Indiana University-Purdue University Fort Wayne basketball games. In September 2006, UPN programming was dropped after the network merged with The WB (seen locally on WPTA-operated cable-only outlet "WBFW") to form The CW.

On September 15, 2008, WANE announced LIN TV, Time Warner Cable and Bright House Networks had not been able to reach an agreement to renew carriage of WANE and other LIN-owned stations on the two cable providers due to a dispute over compensation for the stations' carriage. The company reached agreements with all television service providers in the Fort Wayne area, except for TWC and Bright House. The contract with those providers expired on October 2, 2008. At 12:35 a.m. on October 3, the LIN-owned stations were removed from TWC and Bright House systems nationwide. It would not be until October 29 when WANE-TV was restored to Time Warner Cable in Northwest Ohio. However, it did not reappear on Bright House Networks systems in Grant County, Indiana. Bright House subscribers in Grant County now only have WTTV from Indianapolis as their CBS affiliate.

On March 21, 2014, Media General announced that it would purchase LIN Media and its stations, including WANE-TV, in a $1.6 billion merger. The merger was completed on December 19.

Shortly thereafter, after an aborted merger plan with Meredith Corporation, Media General announced on January 27, 2016, that it was being acquired by Nexstar Broadcasting Group with the new company named "Nexstar Media Group". As Nexstar already owned WFFT, FCC regulations required the combined company to sell one of the stations to another company. Nexstar announced on June 13, 2016, that it would keep WANE and sell WFFT-TV as well as four other stations (including now-former sister stations WLFI-TV in Lafayette and WTHI-TV in Terre Haute) to Heartland Media, through its USA Television MidAmerica Holdings joint venture with MSouth Equity Partners, for $115 million.

In October 2018, WANE-TV incorporated the CBS eye with the "15" and redesigned its company logo. Additionally, the station also retired the "NewsChannel 15" moniker after 26 years (during its LIN Media and Media General ownership) and rebranded to "WANE 15".

== News operation ==
WANE-TV presently broadcasts 24 hours of locally produced newscasts each week (with four hours each weekday and two hours each on Saturdays and Sundays); in addition, the station produces the sports highlight program The Highlight Zone, which airs Friday nights at 11:10 p.m. The station's weekend morning news runs for an hour beginning at 8 a.m. on Sundays with an earlier start at 7 a.m. on Saturdays. The reason for an inconsistent start time is due to CBS and children's programming obligations.

Unlike most CBS affiliates in the Eastern Time Zone, the station does not air local newscasts in the weeknight 5:30 p.m. timeslot due to the syndicated program Inside Edition. Additionally, WANE's weekend morning newscasts used to be the market's only one until WPTA debuted a competing weekend morning news in early November 2016.

After having its operations taken over by the Granite Broadcasting Corporation, WISE-TV's news department was combined with ABC affiliate WPTA. There was a decrease in ratings for the new Indiana's NewsCenter newscasts, which resulted in WANE-TV becoming the market's dominant news station (according to Nielsen Media Research) since it was the only other news-producing station in the area prior to WFFT-TV beginning a nightly newscast in 2009. This was most easily attributed to continued viewer resentment towards WPTA and Granite for the elimination of WISE-TV's news department and arguably its identity and history. WPTA management said the changes were part of a longer-term plan that would need up to five years to take hold with viewers.

On May 18, 2009, WPTA and WISE-TV became the first two television stations in the Fort Wayne market to upgrade their newscasts to 16:9 widescreen enhanced definition. Although not truly high definition, the aspect ratio matched those of HD television screens. Broadcasts on WANE-TV were previously in pillarboxed 4:3 standard definition, though by July 2012, the station began the process of transitioning its newscasts to high definition. The upgrade to HD occurred, along with the debut of a new set and graphics on September 10, 2012, making it the second station (and first network-affiliated station) in the Fort Wayne market to have made the upgrade (WFFT-TV, a former Fox affiliate that has since rejoined the network, was the first but did not make the upgrade until after the station had lost its Fox affiliation in 2011).

=== Notable former on-air staff ===
- Aishah Hasnie – investigative reporter (2008–2011)
- Nicole Manske – reporter (2001–2004; now at ESPN)
- Rolland Smith – anchor (1965–1967)

== Technical information ==
=== Subchannels ===
The station's digital signal is multiplexed:

Subchannels of WANE-TV
| Subchannel | Res. | Short name | Programming |
|---|---|---|---|
| 15.1 | 1080i | WANE-HD | CBS |
| 15.2 | 480i | ION | Ion (4:3) |
| 15.3 | 480i | LAFF | Laff (4:3) |
| 15.4 | 480i | Escape | Ion Mystery (4:3) |

On August 7, 2009, WANE began offering Mobile TV using BlackBerry.

On December 2, 2011, WANE-TV announced that it had signed an affiliation agreement with Antenna TV, when it began airing on its previously vacant 15.2 digital subchannel on December 26. The Antenna TV affiliation has since moved to WFFT-DT3 as of March 2018.

=== Analog-to-digital conversion ===
WANE-TV shut down its analog signal, over UHF channel 15, on June 12, 2009, the official date on which full-power television stations in the United States transitioned from analog to digital broadcasts under federal mandate. The station's digital signal remained on its pre-transition UHF channel 31, using virtual channel 15.
