= W. Don Cornwell =

American businessman

W. Don Cornwell (born January 17, 1948) is a retired investment banker and broadcast media executive. He was the founder, CEO, and Chairman of Granite Broadcasting, which at the time was the largest television broadcast company controlled by an African-American, from 1988 to his retirement in 2009. Prior to founding Granite Broadcasting, he was at Goldman Sachs for 17 years.

He currently serves on the boards of Pfizer, AIG, and Natura & Co (formerly Avon).

== Early life and education ==
Cornwell was born in 1948 in Cushing, Oklahoma. He later moved with his family to Tacoma, Washington, attending Stadium High School.

He received a BA in political science from Occidental College in Los Angeles in 1969. He received an MBA from Harvard University in 1971.

== Career ==
=== Goldman Sachs ===
After receiving his MBA in 1971, Cornwell worked on Wall Street at Goldman Sachs. He was a vice president of the investment banking division at Goldman Sachs from 1976 to 1988. From 1980 to 1988 he was Chief Operating Officer of its corporate finance department.

=== Granite Broadcasting ===
In 1988, Cornwell left Goldman Sachs to found Granite Broadcasting, a broadcasting holding company, with co-founder Stuart Beck, a New York attorney. Cornwell became chairman and CEO of the company, and Beck became president. With initial capitalization from Minority Enterprise Small Business Investment Companies (MESBICs), Oprah Winfrey, and Goldman Sachs, the company's first acquisitions were television stations in Duluth and Peoria in 1988, followed by stations in Fort Wayne and San Jose in 1989 and 1990.

Cornwell took the company public via an IPO in early 1992, and it traded on the NASDAQ. Cornwell and Beck retained control of all voting stock, with Cornwell holding 55% and Beck holding 45%.

Cornwell led Granite to specialize in developing and operating small to middle-market television broadcast stations. Its business strategy was to provide high quality local news and sports for each market, and its goal was to become the leading provider of news, weather, and sports information in these markets. Granite supported diverse programming in terms of gender, ethnicity, religion, and racial background, and the company placed a heavy emphasis on local programming, particularly news programming, and on reflecting the flavor and diversity of an individual station's community. Granite also gave leeway to local television station managers, who were allowed to make market-specific programming decisions.

Following the acquisition of more stations, buying them below market value and turning them around, by 1995 Granite's stock had surged and it was the top performing media company in the U.S. In 1995 Granite was Black Enterprise's Company of the Year.

After acquiring key stations in Detroit and San Francisco, by 1998 Granite had 10 network affiliates across the United States; it was the seventh-largest black-owned business in the U.S., and the largest minority-owned media company in New York. Under Cornwell's leadership, by the mid-2000s, via acquisitions Granite owned and operated or provided programming, sales, and other services to 23 channels in 11 markets. Its channel group included affiliates of NBC, CBS, ABC, The CW, and MyNetworkTV, and reached approximately 6% of all U.S. television households. It was the largest African American-controlled television broadcast company in the U.S.

In the 2000s Granite's stock plunged, attributed to three factors: the company's 2000 "reverse compensation" agreement to pay $362 million for an NBC affiliation in San Francisco, an advertising recession, and the end of federal tax incentives for minority-owned broadcasting stations. Additionally, the company sustained heavy losses from 2003 to 2005. Following the demise of The WB network, Granite Broadcasting filed for voluntary reorganization under Chapter 11 of the U.S. Bankruptcy Code in December 2006. It emerged from restructuring in June 2007 under the majority ownership of private-equity firm Silver Point Capital, previously one of its creditors.

Cornwell retooled Granite by increasing its digitalization and technological innovations, and by relaunching and revitalizing station websites in partnership with Broadcast Interactive Media, including adding YouNews platforms which allowed local viewers to submit video footage for station usage. He also renegotiated retransmission consent fees.

In August 2009, Cornwell retired as chairman and CEO of Granite, staying on as Vice Chairman through December 2009.

As of 2020, Cornwell is on the boards of directors of Pfizer, AIG, and Natura & Co (formerly Avon). He is also on the board of trustees of Big Brothers Big Sisters of New York City.

== Personal life ==
Cornwell married New York attorney Saundra Clarke Williams in 1983. Saundra Cornwell was partner at the law firm Bower & Gardner from 1984 until it dissolved in 1994. They live in New York City and have two adult children.
