= Ann Colone =

American broadcaster (1930–2007)

- Born: Ann L. Colone; June 11, 1930; Ft. Wayne, Indiana
- Died: June 12, 2007 (aged 77); Ft. Wayne, Indiana
- Resting place: Catholic Cemetery, Ft. Wayne
- Education: Central Catholic School
- Occupation: TV host
- Years active: 1958-1976
- Employer(s): WGL (AM) & WANE-TV
- Known for: The Ann Colone Show (WANE-TV)

Ann L. Colone (June 11, 1930 – June 12, 2007) was a pioneering female broadcaster in Fort Wayne, Indiana, United States, whose career as TV host spanned three decades. She was the first female radio disc jockey for WGL (AM) and was a regular contributor at WANE-TV, which is a CBS affiliate, since it went on air in 1958, and she became well known as the first local female TV host of her own afternoon program with residents, local news makers, and national celebrities as guests.

== Personal history ==
Her parents Joseph and Mary (née LaRosa) Colone were Italian-American grocers and operated the Family Colone Grocery Store in Ft. Wayne. Ann was the youngest female of ten children, which included siblings Dominic, Ferdinand, Ralph, Josephine, Anthony, Frankie, Virginia, Martha, and Franklin. Her family was Roman Catholic, and she attended Central Catholic School, where she graduated in 1947. She resided in Ft. Wayne and entered the broadcasting business. Colone was 77 at the time of her death and was buried in the Catholic Cemetery of Ft. Wayne.

== Career ==
Ann Colone began her career in broadcasting as a secretary for WGL (AM) radio station and then later became a DJ on the station.

Colone switched to television in 1958 when she joined WANE-TV. On her first Saturday morning TV show, Colone demonstrated toys for children, which was sponsored by a local toy store. At the time, Corinthian Broadcasting appointed her as Women's Director of WANE-TV, as it did at other stations it owned, hiring such women as Joanne King (KHOU-TV, Houston), Faith Levitt (WISH-TV, Indianapolis), Gay Miller (KOTV, Tulsa), and Myra Scott (KXTV, Sacramento). She was well known as the host of The Ann Colone Show, a daily, noon time, homemaker and talk show on WANE-TV for about 18 years. The show began as a half-hour show, but grew to an hour, then to an hour and a half. She interviewed numerous and various celebrities of the time such as Vincent Price, Lucille Ball, Bob Hope, Woody Allen, Robert F. Kennedy, Walter Cronkite, Count Basie, and The Rolling Stones in the group's earliest days. The show was popular locally and her audience was typically three-fourths and more female. For a while, she replaced the host Dave King in a popular afternoon movie program called "Dialing for Dollars". After she ended her program, Colone continued to work for WANE-TV behind the camera in promotions and advertising and stayed there until 1981.

After leaving WANE-TV, she worked for Arata Medical Group and hosted "Ask The Physician" for radio about health and medical topics. She was also a well known actor in many local plays for years.

== Awards ==
- TV-Radio Mirror Magazine's Gold Medal for Best TV Women's Interest Show—Midwest States (1961)
- Best Actress award for "The Rose Tattoo" from Ft. Wayne Civic Theater
- Silver Medal award from the Advertising Association of Ft. Wayne

== Leadership ==
- President of Advertising Association of Fort Wayne (1979)

== TV Program ==
- "Ann Colone Remembers," a television biography produced and aired on WFWA (PBS affiliate)
