= Dick Florea =

News personality in Fort Wayne, Indiana, USA

Dick Florea was a longtime news personality with television station WKJG-TV in Fort Wayne, Indiana. He graduated with a degree in industrial management from Purdue University in January 1959. After working at WMRI Radio and WTAF-TV, both in Marion, Indiana, Florea joined the WKJG-TV news department in 1966. He was the main evening news anchor from 1966 until 1983. Florea was the station's news director from 1970 until 1987. He later served as Public Affairs and Community Relations Director, and hosted "Editor's Desk" and "Our Town" news segments. Florea retired in 2001 and is considered a pioneer in Fort Wayne Television.
