= Malara Broadcast Group =

American media company

Malara Broadcast Group of Sarasota, Florida, a Delaware corporation, also known as Malara Broadcasting, was a broadcasting holding company. Malara Broadcasting was founded in 2004 by Tony Malara, former president of affiliate relations for CBS. Malara owned two television stations: KDLH in Duluth, Minnesota and WPTA in Fort Wayne, Indiana.

== History ==
On April 23, 2004, Malara Broadcast Group entered into agreements to purchase KDLH and WPTA. This marked Malara's first action as a company. These purchases were completed in early March 2005.

On March 8, 2005, Malara Broadcast Group entered into a credit agreement with Granite Broadcasting. This agreement gave Malara Broadcasting $48.5 million and a revolving credit line of $5 million, which it used to purchase KDLH (from former owner New Vision Television) and WPTA, from Granite. In addition to this agreement, Malara also entered into a second agreement with Granite, under which Granite would operate, promote, and sell advertising for the two Malara stations. This is known as a local marketing agreement.

The future of Malara Broadcasting was in doubt given several occurrences stemming from the death of group founder Tony Malara from leukemia and a heart attack on August 24, 2006, as well as financial woes of partner Granite Broadcasting which filed for Chapter 11 bankruptcy on December 11, 2006. Both the future of the Granite group and any rulings on who would get control of Malara could have led to massive changes with the company. Granite emerged from bankruptcy in mid-2007 under the control of the Connecticut-based private equity firm Silver Point Capital, who also controlled Communications Corporation of America, White Knight Broadcasting and selected Spanish-language stations acquired from Equity Media Holdings.

Malara Broadcasting filed its financial results to the SEC jointly with Granite, leading many to believe that it was simply a shell corporation for Granite. If this were true, Granite and Malara would have been in violation of the FCC's rules on duopolies. FCC regulations do not allow duopolies between two of the four highest-rated stations in a market. Additionally, neither Fort Wayne and Duluth have enough full-power stations to legally permit a duopoly in any case. Fort Wayne and Duluth have only six full-power stations each, and FCC regulations require a market to have eight unique station owners once a duopoly is formed—effectively restricting duopolies to markets with at least nine full-power stations. Similar allegations surround Cunningham Broadcasting, which many believe is simply a shell for Sinclair Broadcast Group.

On February 11, 2014, it was announced that, as part of Quincy Newspapers' purchase of several Granite stations, Malara would sell WPTA to Quincy and KDLH to SagamoreHill Broadcasting. As a result of the deal, Quincy, which is acquiring KBJR-TV from Granite in the deal, was to provide services to KDLH, while WPTA was to provide services to WISE-TV, which Granite planned to sell to SagamoreHill (currently, WPTA receives services from WISE). SagamoreHill was dropped from the transaction in a November 2014 restructuring of the deal; as a result, Malara would have retained WPTA and KDLH and Quincy would have acquired WISE. Quincy would have continued to provide services to the Malara stations. In July 2015, the deal was reworked again, reverting to the original structure of Quincy acquiring WPTA and KBJR and SagamoreHill acquiring WISE and KDLH. However, the agreements between Quincy and SagamoreHill would be wound down within nine months of the deal's consummation, after which WISE's and KDLH's existing Big Three network affiliations would be moved to subchannels of WPTA and KBJR, respectively, and WISE and KDLH would begin operating independently of WPTA and KBJR as solely The CW Plus affiliates. The deal was completed on November 2, 2015; the affiliation switches and the termination of the sharing agreements took effect on August 1, 2016. Quincy would acquire the two CW stations outright in 2018, reuniting them with their former LMA partners.
