= Janette Luu =

Vietnamese-American broadcaster (born 1976)

- Born: Janette Nguyen Luu; March 18, 1976 (age 50); Big Spring, Texas, U.S.
- Education: University of Michigan
- Occupations: TV host, news anchor, producer
- Website: Official website

Janette N. Luu (born March 18, 1976) is an American broadcaster. Until October 2009, she hosted CANOE Live, a local TV program on Sun TV in Toronto, Ontario, Canada, as Toronto's first-ever Vietnamese TV news anchor.

== Early life and education ==
Luu was born in Big Spring, Texas. Luu's parents came to the United States in 1975 from Vietnam, with her birth coming just a year afterward. During her childhood, Luu attended Haley Elementary and Blackhawk Middle School. Luu later attended Snider High School, where she won first place for a speech written for 'Project XL', an Indiana competition sponsored by Farm Bureau and the Indiana High School Athletic Association. Having co-anchored the school's weekly television show known as Panther's Pause, Luu also graduated as valedictorian from Snider High School, having been labeled as "Most Likely to be the First Woman President" in the school yearbook.

Luu's parents had many expectations for her that involved a degree in medicine. She had wanted to be a doctor since she was young, which was why she first enrolled in and graduated from the University of Michigan, pursuing a pre-med double major and earning Bachelor of Science degrees in both biology and Latin. She graduated in 1998, but decided afterward that she "didn't want a medical career".

== Career ==
For her first job, she worked at the ABC affiliate, 21-Alive WPTA TV, in Fort Wayne, Indiana, United States, as a production assistant in charge of minor editing and running the teleprompter. Rising to the position of full television reporter after a year and a half, Luu was known to be the "second Vietnamese TV reporter in her city".

In 2004, Luu helped organize 'Pop Filter' as an art installation and event. Its success led to her creating 'City Prototype' with Matt Stuart, as an event to highlight the importance of ideas and creativity in relation to Fort Wayne's economic growth. This event prompted proactive involvement from school students and recent graduates in sharing their own visions for the future of the city. Also in 2004, she was a winner of the 2004 Future 40 Award presented by the Fort Wayne Business Journal, to individuals selected for their achievements in professional accomplishment.

In 2005, Luu and Matt Stuart won a $25,000 award in Visa's "Ideas Happen" contest for her concept of bringing different religious persuasions together. Titled "Project Inspire" her idea seeks to "provide understanding and to show connections between all religions". Only 12 individuals were chosen for awards out of 19,000 entries. Her work within the community was recognized when she became the cover story for the premiere issue of Fort Wayne Woman.

She announced in 2005 that she would be moving to Toronto, Ontario, Canada, in order to host CANOE Live on Sun TV, "Channel 15's six-o'clock current affairs show", which began airing in April 2006. She completed her move to Toronto in early April, 2006, just before the start of CANOE Live. As an anchor in Toronto, she was the "first-ever Vietnamese TV news anchor". Luu departed from hosting CANOE Live in October 2009.

=== Career highlights ===
- reporter, WPTA-TV 21 (ABC) 2000-2006 (Fort Wayne, Indiana)
- producer/voice talent, Fort Wayne Community Schools Staff Spotlight 2001-2005 (Fort Wayne, Indiana)
- anchor, WPTA-TV 21 Alive News anchor (ABC) 2003-2006 (Fort Wayne, Indiana)
- creative 100 member, Memphis Manifesto Summit 2003 (Memphis, Tennessee)
- executive director, City Prototype 2004 (Fort Wayne, Indiana)
- founder of multimedia art event Pop Filter 2004 (Fort Wayne, Indiana)
- anchor, CANOE Live on Sun TV, 2006-2009 (Toronto, Ontario, Canada)
