= Granite Broadcasting =

American television broadcast company

Granite Broadcasting LLC
- Type: Private
- Industry: Television
- Founded: 1988; 38 years ago
- Founders: W. Don Cornwell; Stuart Beck
- Defunct: February 13, 2026; 9 months ago
- Fate: Majority of station assets acquired by Quincy Media in 2015; last remaining station acquired by Deerfield Media in 2026
- Successor: Quincy Media; Gray Media; Deerfield Media; Sinclair Broadcast Group
- Headquarters: 767 Third Avenue, New York City, New York, United States
- Key people: Peter Markham (Chairman and CEO); Duane Lammers (COO)
- Owner: Silver Point Capital

Granite Broadcasting LLC was an American broadcasting holding company based in New York City. Granite was founded by W. Don Cornwell and Stuart Beck in 1988, and was the first African-American station group in the United States to considered to be a "major" station operator (though not the first minority-owned chain, a distinction held by the now-defunct Aleut-owned Cook Inlet Broadcasting).

Granite's chairman/CEO was Peter Markham, with Duane Lammers serving as COO.

== History ==
W. Don Cornwell left Goldman Sachs' investment banking department in 1988. He co-founded Granite Broadcasting Corporation with Stuart Beck on February 8, 1988. In 1993, it purchased two stations from Meredith Corporation, which included WTVH in Syracuse and KSEE in Fresno, for $38 million.

In 1997, Granite purchased television station KOFY-TV for $143.8 million, becoming their largest station purchase. Cornwell was CEO and chairman of Granite until resigning in 2009. During his time with the company, Granite expanded to 23 channels and 11 markets. In April 2006, Granite acquired WBNG-TV in Binghamton from SJL Broadcasting, which was in the process of liquidating most of its broadcasting holdings, which paid $45 million to cost.

Granite declared Chapter 11 bankruptcy on December 11, 2006, mainly due to the complications of the 2006 United States broadcast television realignment which nullified the sales of the group's Detroit and San Francisco The WB affiliates due to those stations being left out of The CW because of CBS Corporation-owned stations in both cities taking the affiliation by default. It emerged from bankruptcy in June 2007, under the control of private equity firm Silver Point Capital (which also acquired ComCorp later that year).

In 2011, it filed a lawsuit against Nexstar Broadcasting Group for having the Fox affiliation to appear on WPTA's digital subchannel after WFFT's removal of it. The suit was settled in 2013, and WFFT reclaimed the Fox affiliation.

In February 2014, Granite reached deals to sell the majority of its stations. WKBW-TV in Buffalo, New York and WMYD in Detroit were sold to the E. W. Scripps Company for $110 million (the latter forming a duopoly with Scripps-owned ABC affiliate WXYZ-TV). Most of its remaining stations (mostly in small markets), along with the Malara Broadcast Group's two stations, went to Quincy Newspapers and SagamoreHill Broadcasting (which originally planned to operate the LMA-controlled stations Granite currently provides services to for Quincy). SagamoreHill was subsequently withdrawn from the Quincy transaction.

In July 2015, a reworked deal was reached to have SagamoreHill acquire WISE, the SSA between WISE and WPTA (owned by Quincy), and have all of WISE's network affiliations moved to WPTA in exchange for its The CW Plus affiliation within nine months of the closure. On September 15, 2015, the FCC approved the deal, which was completed on November 2.

WTVH, which was the last remaining station in Granite's portfolio from 2018 until 2026, now serves only as an ATSC 1.0 beacon for the stations of Sinclair Broadcast Group. Sinclair's main Syracuse station WSTM has operated WTVH under a local marketing agreement since 2009; on December 1, 2025, Sinclair moved WTVH's programming to a newly licensed station under its own ownership, WKOF, which operates on the ATSC 3.0 standard, as does WSTM. The remaining video services operating on the WTVH license are two Sinclair-owned digital subchannel networks, Roar and Charge. On December 17, 2025, it was announced that Granite would sell WTVH to Deerfield Media; which was completed on February 13, 2026.

== Former stations ==
Stations are arranged in alphabetical order by state and city of license.

Stations formerly owned by Granite Broadcasting
Media market	State	Station	Purchased	Sold	Notes
Fresno	California	KSEE	1993	2013	
San Francisco–San Jose	California	KNTV	1990	2002	
San Francisco–San Jose	California	KOFY-TV	1998	2018	(Note: Known as KBWB from 1998 through 2008.)
Peoria	Illinois	WEEK-TV	1988	2015	
Peoria	Illinois	WHOI	2009	2015	(Note: Owned by a third party.)
Peoria	Illinois	WAOE	1999	2014	
Fort Wayne	Indiana	WPTA	1989	2005	(Note: Owned by Malara Broadcast Group from 2005 to 2015.)
Fort Wayne	Indiana	WISE-TV	2005	2015	
Detroit	Michigan	WMYD	1997	2014	(Note: Known as WXON prior to 1997 and as WDWB from 1997 to 2006.)
Kalamazoo	Michigan	WWMT	1995	1998	
Lansing	Michigan	WLAJ	1996	1998	
Chisholm	Minnesota	KRII	2002	2015	(Note: Satellite of KBJR-TV.)
Duluth	Minnesota	KBJR-TV	1988	2015	
Duluth	Minnesota	KDLH	2005	2015	
Binghamton	New York	WBNG-TV	2006	2015	
Buffalo	New York	WKBW-TV	1995	2014	
Syracuse	New York	WTVH	1993	2026	(Note: Operated by Sinclair Broadcast Group from 2013 to 2026.)
Austin	Texas	KEYE-TV	1994	1999	(Note: Known as KBVO-TV prior to 1995.)
