= KDLH =

Television station in Duluth, Minnesota

- Duluth, Minnesota; Superior, Wisconsin; United States
- City: Duluth, Minnesota
- Channels: Digital: 33 (UHF); Virtual: 3
- Branding: Duluth CW

Programming
- Affiliations: 3.1: CW+; for others, see § Subchannels

Ownership
- Owner: Gray Media; (Gray Television Licensee, LLC)
- Sister stations: KBJR-TV

History
- First air date: March 14, 1954
- Former call signs: KDAL-TV (1954–1979)
- Former channel numbers: Analog: 3 (VHF, 1954–2009)
- Former affiliations: NBC (1954–1955); ABC (secondary, 1954–1966); CBS (1955–2016); Fox (secondary, 1996–2000); CW+ (3.2, 2006–2016)
- Call sign meaning: Duluth

Technical information
- Licensing authority: FCC
- Facility ID: 4691
- ERP: 381 kW
- HAAT: 310.2 m (1,018 ft)
- Transmitter coordinates: 46°47′21.1″N 92°6′51.4″W

Links
- Public license information: Public file; LMS
- Website: www.yourcwtv.com/partners/duluth/

KDLH (channel 3) is a television station in Duluth, Minnesota, United States, affiliated with The CW Plus. It is owned by Gray Media alongside Superior, Wisconsin–licensed dual NBC/CBS affiliate KBJR-TV, channel 6 (and its Chisholm, Minnesota–licensed semi-satellite KRII, channel 11). The two stations share studios on South Lake Avenue in Canal Park, downtown Duluth; KDLH's transmitter is located west of downtown in Hilltop Park.

Throughout most of the station's history, KDLH had long been the Twin Ports' CBS affiliate. In its latter years, it was operated by Quincy Media through a shared services agreement (SSA) with then-owner SagamoreHill Broadcasting, making it sister to KBJR and KRII. Following the end of KDLH's SSA on August 1, 2016 (resulting from the station's sale from Malara Broadcast Group, concurrent with the sale of KBJR by Granite Broadcasting), CBS programming was moved to KBJR-DT2 and KDLH switched exclusively to The CW.

== History ==
KDLH began broadcasting on March 14, 1954, as KDAL-TV and aired an analog signal on VHF channel 3. It took its calls from the initials of its founder, Dalton Alexander LeMasurier, who owned the station along with KDAL radio (610 AM). It switched affiliations with WDSM-TV (now KBJR) in 1955 and joined CBS. It also aired some ABC programs in off-hours, splitting them with WDSM-TV, until WDIO-TV signed-on in 1966. The station's original studio facilities were located with KDAL Radio in the Bradley Building (demolished) moved to West Superior Street in downtown Duluth in the mid-1960s. During the late-1950s, KDAL was also briefly affiliated with the NTA Film Network. The LeMasurier family sold KDAL-AM-TV to what eventually became Tribune Broadcasting in 1960. KDAL began broadcasting in color in 1965. In 1979, Tribune sold the station to Palmer Broadcasting, who changed the call letters to the current KDLH-TV on February 16. Palmer Broadcasting then sold KDLH to Benedek Broadcasting in 1985. The station dropped the "-TV" suffix in 1991.

Former KDLH logo (circa 2015).

Benedek went bankrupt in 2002, and most of the company merged with Gray Television in 2001. However, KDLH was not included in the merger and was sold to Chelsey Broadcasting instead. New Vision Television bought the station in 2003.

In March 2005, the Malara Broadcast Group purchased channel 3 from New Vision and outsourced most of the station's operations to longtime rival KBJR, who was owned by Granite Broadcasting. Under this agreement, KDLH laid off most of its staff. Filings with the Federal Communications Commission (FCC) showed Malara could operate KDLH with as few as two people on the payroll.

KDLH's digital transmitter had been operating at reduced power with a substitute side-mounted antenna after a May 18, 2008, fire that severely damaged its main digital antenna. It returned to full power on UHF channel 33 by June of that year. In February 2009, Malara Broadcasting announced that KDLH would not make the switch to all digital later in the month due to the fire. With that announcement, the station was the only one in the area still broadcasting in analog after February 19 as KBJR, WDSE, WDIO, and KQDS-TV all went digital-only on that date. On June 12 at around 7 p.m., KDLH ceased normal broadcasting operations on its analog signal. At that time, the analog station began a nightlight signal consisting of a ten-minute digital television informational video on a constant loop.

On June 26, two weeks after regular broadcasts had ended, the nightlight signal was terminated with the help of Bob Peterson (a former engineer at the station who helped launch KDLH in 1954) bringing an end to all full-power analog broadcasting in the area. In November 2009, the station re-branded from "CBS 3" to "KDLH 3". This brought a new logo to the station for the first time since it merged with KBJR.

On February 11, 2014, it was announced that Quincy Newspapers would acquire KBJR-TV and KRII from Granite Broadcasting. Malara initially planned to concurrently sell KDLH to SagamoreHill Broadcasting; however, that November, the deal was reworked to remove SagamoreHill from the transaction, and as a result KDLH would remain with Malara. Quincy would continue to provide services to KDLH.

In July 2015, the deal was reworked yet again; it returned to its previous structure, with SagamoreHill acquiring KDLH and being operated under an SSA by Quincy. However, the SSA was wound down on August 1, 2016: at this time, CBS programming was moved to a subchannel of KBJR, and KDLH began operating independently as a CW affiliate. The sale was completed on November 2. The move ended KDLH's 61-year association with the CBS network.

On May 21, 2018, it was announced that Quincy Media would acquire KDLH outright for $792,557. While the FCC normally prohibits one company from owning two television licenses in the same market when both are among the top four rated stations, Quincy submitted a filing saying that during the November 2017 "sweeps" period, KBJR-TV was the top ranked station while KDLH placed fifth. The sale was completed on August 1.

On February 1, 2021, Gray Television announced its intent to purchase Quincy Media for $925 million. The acquisition was completed on August 2, making KBJR and KDLH sisters to Gray stations in nearby markets, including CBS/Fox affiliates KEYC-TV in Mankato and WSAW-TV/WZAW-LD in Wausau, and NBC affiliates WLUC-TV in Marquette and WEAU in Eau Claire, while separating from their former Wisconsin sister stations which were divested in order to complete the purchase.

== News operation ==
While operating its own news department, KDLH was the last of the big three stations in Duluth to have a weekday 5 p.m. broadcast. It aired Judge Judy in the time slot instead. In 2004, it debuted a 5 p.m. show that featured anchor Amy Rutledge and meteorologist Phil Johnson. This was replaced along with its 6 o'clock show with the current one at 5:30 when KDLH merged with KBJR in March 2005. Jeopardy! has since reclaimed the 5 o'clock spot on channel 3 and the CBS Evening News airs at 6.

After the buyout, the station had its news department closed and merged with KBJR. To maintain a separate identity, there were some channel 6 personalities that were also seen on KDLH. However, due to KBJR's existing newscasts, not all of that station's personnel were seen on channel 3.

KDLH's Northland's NewsCenter at 5:30 had been anchored by Pat Kelly who was the only channel 3 news team member remaining after the KDLH sellout. Its weeknight 10 p.m. newscast, which continues to be a separate production, was known as Northland's NewsCenter Express and consisted of a ten-minute news "capsule". The other 25 minutes was a Seinfeld rerun. After thirteen months of mediocre ratings, KDLH changed the 10 o'clock show to the traditional 35 minutes and re-branded it to Northland's NewsCenter Tonight.

KDLH and KBJR began broadcasting their local newscasts in 16:9 widescreen on May 4, 2009. They were the first television stations in the market to do so. Although not true high definition, the format matches the ratio of HD televisions. As of November, this station has now begun to brand its separate weeknight shows as KDLH 3 News. These broadcasts air from a secondary set. On January 11, 2010, KDLH began airing the area's only weeknight 6:30 newscast.

In the fall of 2014, KDLH partnered with KDAL radio (now owned by Midwest Communications) to produce a unique simulcast broadcast airing KDAL's Cadigan and Kelly. KDLH installed cameras and switching gear so each member of the KDAL team could be seen on air.

KDLH's intellectual unit was re-located to KBJR-DT2 on August 1, 2016.

=== Notable former on-air staff ===
- E. D. Hill

== Technical information ==
=== Subchannels ===
The station's signal is multiplexed:

Subchannels of KDLH
Channel	Res.	Short name	Programming
3.1	720p	KDLHCW	The CW Plus
3.2	480i	TCN	True Crime Network
3.3	480i	Laff	Laff
3.4	720p	CourtTV	Court TV
3.5	480i	Mystery	Ion Mystery
3.6	480i	Quest	Quest
3.7	480i	H&I	Heroes & Icons

=== Analog-to-digital conversion ===
KDLH ended regular programming on its analog signal, over VHF channel 3, on June 12, 2009, as part of the federally mandated transition from analog to digital television. The station's digital signal remained on its pre-transition UHF channel 33, using virtual channel 3.

As part of the SAFER Act, KDLH kept its analog signal on the air until June 26 to inform viewers of the digital television transition through a loop of public service announcements from the National Association of Broadcasters.

== See also ==
- Channel 2 branded TV stations in the United States
- Channel 3 virtual TV stations in the United States
- Channel 33 digital TV stations in the United States
