= WXOW =

Television station in La Crosse, Wisconsin

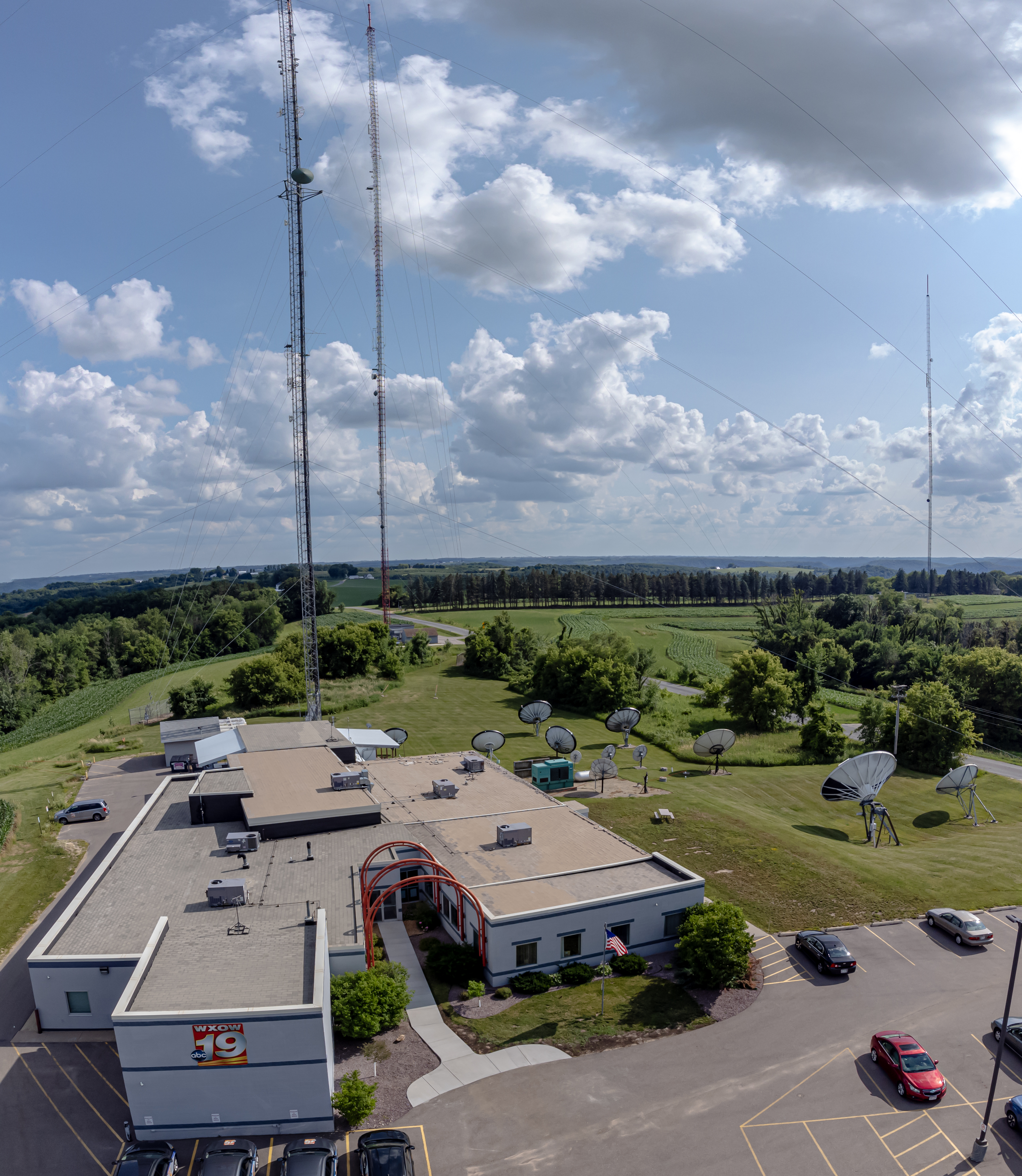
- La Crosse, Wisconsin; United States
- Channels: Digital: 28 (UHF); Virtual: 19
- Branding: WXOW 19; 19 News

Programming
- Affiliations: 19.1: ABC; for others, see § Subchannels

Ownership
- Owner: Allen Media Group; (La Crosse TV License Company, LLC)
- Sister stations: WQOW, WAOW/WMOW, WKOW, KIMT

History
- First air date: March 7, 1970
- Former channel numbers: Analog: 19 (UHF, 1970–2009); Digital: 14 (UHF, 2002–2009), 48 (UHF, 2009–2018)
- Former affiliations: The CW (19.2, 2006−2021)
- Call sign meaning: "X" for La Crosse, and sister to Madison's WKOW

Technical information
- Licensing authority: FCC
- Facility ID: 64549
- ERP: 251 kW
- HAAT: 348 m (1,142 ft)
- Transmitter coordinates: 43°48′23″N 91°22′3″W

Links
- Public license information: Public file; LMS
- Website: www.wxow.com

WXOW (channel 19) is a television station in La Crosse, Wisconsin, United States, affiliated with ABC and owned by Allen Media Group. The station's studios and transmitter are located on County Highway 25 in La Crescent, Minnesota.

WQOW (channel 18) in Eau Claire operates as a semi-satellite of WXOW, extending the ABC signal into the Chippewa Valley of Wisconsin. As such, it simulcasts most network and syndicated programming as provided through WXOW but airs separate commercial inserts, legal identifications, local newscasts, severe weather cut-ins, and Sunday morning religious programs, and has its own website. WXOW serves the southern half of the La Crosse–Eau Claire market while WQOW serves the northern portion. The two stations are counted as a single unit for ratings purposes. Although WQOW maintains its own studios on Friedeck Road in Eau Claire, master control and some internal operations are based at WXOW's facilities. DirecTV and Dish Network as well as most vMVPDs offer both WXOW and WQOW as of October 2025.

== History ==
WXOW signed on on March 7, 1970, as a semi-satellite of WKOW-TV in Madison, which was owned by Horizon Communications at the time. Before then, ABC programming in the market was relegated to off-hours clearances on CBS affiliate WKBT (channel 8) and NBC affiliate WEAU (channel 13). Depending on the location, Western Wisconsin viewers could get the full ABC schedule on KMSP-TV from the Twin Cities, KAUS-TV in Austin, Minnesota, or WKOW.

For its first decade on the air, WXOW's UHF signal was marginal at best in Eau Claire, primarily because its transmitter was located in Minnesota. As a result, Chippewa Valley viewers only got a decent signal from the station when cable arrived in the market in the mid-1970s. In order to solve this reception problem, WXOW severed the electronic umbilical cord with WKOW and signed on WQOW as a full-time satellite on September 22, 1980, two years after the station was sold to Liberty Television. Tak Communications purchased Liberty Television's Wisconsin-based stations in 1985. In 1991, Tak filed for Chapter 11 bankruptcy; it would be taken over by a group of creditors less than three years later. This resulted in the sale of Tak's Wisconsin stations to Shockley Communications in 1995.

WXOW and WQOW began operating a cable-only affiliate of The WB in 1998 known as "WBCZ". This was seen through a simulcast on channel 15 on most cable systems in La Crosse and Eau Claire. In June 2001, Quincy Newspapers (later Quincy Media) announced that it would acquire Shockley Communications. In September 2002, WXOW became the first La Crosse area television station to broadcast in digital on UHF channel 14. WXOW and WQOW replaced "WBCZ" with new second digital subchannels (simulcasting The CW) when the new network launched in the fall of 2006.

After The CW Plus national feed was upgraded to 720p high-definition level in fall 2012, an HD feed became available on Charter digital channel 610. Up until August 2018, there were two different signals from the same tower at WXOW's studios carrying The CW as a digital translator of sister station KTTC also carried a CW subchannel in high definition.

WXOW began airing solely in digital effective February 17, 2009, with the analog transmitter operating for 60 additional days broadcasting as part of a "nightlight" service with local news and information about the digital transition. On June 11, 2009, WXOW moved from its initial digital channel assignment to channel 48 at a higher broadcasting power. WXOW and WQOW launched This TV (simulcast on new third digital subchannels of the stations) in February–March 2010. WXOW had a construction permit to air a digital fill-in translator covering Tomah, Wisconsin. Airing on UHF channel 28, this low-powered signal would have had a transmitter on Echo Road in western unincorporated Monroe County. The permit was canceled on June 6, 2013.

In January 2021, Gray Television announced its intent to purchase Quincy Media for $925 million. As Gray already owns the market's WEAU, it planned to keep that station and sell both WXOW and WQOW in order to satisfy Federal Communications Commission requirements. On April 29, Gray announced that WXOW and WQOW would be divested to Allen Media Broadcasting. The sale was completed on August 2; on that day, WEAU assumed the CW and MeTV affiliations from WXOW/WQOW.

On June 1, 2025, amid financial woes and rising debt, Allen Media Group announced that it would explore "strategic options" for the company, such as a sale of its television stations (including WXOW/WQOW).

== Programming ==
WXOW is a part of the Green Bay Packers and WIAA sports networks; the former allows the station to carry Packers preseason games and official team programming, and to brand itself as "Your Official Packers Station" for the La Crosse market.

=== Newscasts ===
With the launch of WQOW, WXOW began to simulcast its newscasts on that station. In 1982, WQOW established a separate news operation with local newscasts focusing on Eau Claire and the surrounding areas. Since it did not operate an in-house weather department of its own, all segments originated from WXOW's studios in a tape-delayed arrangement. The effort was canceled in March 1990 as a cost-cutting measure and, as a result, WQOW once again began simulcasting WXOW's newscasts.

In October 1996, WQOW relaunched its local news operation for a second time, which remains to this day. Although this incarnation of news production includes a separate weather department from WXOW, meteorologists from that station can fill-in on WQOW. In September 2011, WXOW became the second television station in the market to perform an upgrade to high definition newscast production. Included in the change was a new studio and updated graphics package. The news department at WQOW was upgraded to HD level at the same time.

== Subchannels ==
The station's signal is multiplexed:

Subchannels of WXOW
Channel	Res.	Short name	Programming
19.1	720p	WXOWABC	ABC
19.2	720p	Catchy	Catchy Comedy
19.3	480i	MeTOONS	MeTV Toons
19.4	720p	CourtTV	Court TV
19.5	480i	Crime	True Crime Network
19.6	480i	Grio	Traffic cameras
