= WMOW =

Television station in Crandon, Wisconsin

Satellite of WAOW, Wausau, Wisconsin
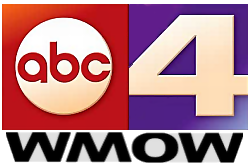
- Crandon, Wisconsin; United States
- Channels: Digital: 13 (VHF); Virtual: 4
- Branding: WMOW 4; News 9 WAOW

Programming
- Affiliations: 4.1: Catchy Comedy; 4.2: ABC; for others, see § Subchannels

Ownership
- Owner: Allen Media Group; (Wausau TV License Company, LLC)

History
- Founded: December 4, 1998
- First air date: February 9, 2001
- Former call signs: WBIJ (2001–2010)
- Former channel numbers: Analog: 4 (VHF, 2001–2009); Digital: 12 (VHF, 2010–2020)
- Former affiliations: FamilyNet (2001–2009); Dark (2009–2010); The CW (2010–2021); ABC (2021−2022, now on DT2)
- Call sign meaning: Metonga Lake WAOW

Technical information
- Licensing authority: FCC
- Facility ID: 81503
- ERP: 3.2 kW
- HAAT: 119 m (390 ft)
- Transmitter coordinates: 45°34′23.4″N 88°52′58.7″W

Links
- Public license information: Public file; LMS
- Website: waow.com

WMOW (channel 4) is a television station licensed to Crandon, Wisconsin, United States, affiliated with ABC. It is a full-time satellite of Wausau-licensed WAOW (channel 9) which is owned by Allen Media Group. WMOW's transmitter is located just east of downtown Crandon; its parent station maintains studios on Grand Avenue/US 51 in Wausau. Besides the transmitter, WMOW does not maintain any physical presence locally in Crandon.

== History ==
Founded December 4, 1998, the station first signed-on February 9, 2001, as WBIJ. It was a FamilyNet affiliate owned by Dennis Selenka. The station aired an analog signal on VHF channel 4. Since WBIJ was granted its construction permit after the finalization of the Federal Communications Commission (FCC) digital television allotment plan on April 21, 1997, it did not receive a companion digital channel.

After Dennis Selenka's death on September 30, 2008, Quincy Newspapers purchased WBIJ from his widow for $1.5 million on February 13, 2009. The company announced its intention to run WBIJ as a second satellite station of WAOW to serve the northeast portion of the Wausau market in a similar capacity that WYOW does for the extreme northern part of the market. In the meantime, WBIJ signed off on June 12 at the end of the digital transition for full-service stations as it did not yet have digital facilities ready.

Quincy brought the station back on-the-air as WMOW on June 4, 2010, as an affiliate of The CW. This station operates its digital signal on VHF channel 12 which was the former analog home of NBC affiliate WJFW-TV.

On June 19, 2011, WAOW (and in turn WMOW-DT2) became the market's second television outlet to upgrade local news to high definition level. Included in the change was a redesigned set and updated graphics scheme.

On January 7, 2021, Quincy Media announced that it had put itself up for sale. On February 1, Gray Television announced it would purchase Quincy's radio and TV properties for $925 million. As Gray already owns WSAW-TV in the Wausau/Rhinelander market, and both that station and WAOW rank among the market's top four stations, it agreed to sell WAOW in order to satisfy FCC requirements.

On April 29, Gray announced that WMOW and WAOW would be divested to Allen Media Group, a subsidiary of Los Angeles–based Entertainment Studios, in a $380 million deal that includes, among other Quincy-owned stations, WKOW in Madison, WXOW in La Crosse, and WQOW in Eau Claire. The deal closed in August 2021, and did not see Gray have any direct ownership or control of those stations. Gray, however, kept WYOW, which later turned into a full-power satellite of WSAW.

On June 1, 2025, amid financial woes and rising debt, Allen Media Group announced that it would explore "strategic options" for the company, such as a sale of its television stations (including WAOW/WMOW).

== Subchannels ==
The station's signal is multiplexed:

Subchannels of WMOW
Subchannel	Res.	Short name	Programming
4.1	720p	WMOW-CW	Catchy Comedy
4.2	720p	WMOW-DT	ABC (WAOW)
4.3	480i	THIS-TV	MeTV Toons (4:3)
4.4	480i		Court TV
4.5	480i		True Crime Network

Simulcast of subchannels of another station
