= NBC Austin =

NBC Austin may refer to:

- KXAN in Austin, Texas
- KTTC in Austin, Minnesota
