= Jodi Huisentruit =

American missing newscaster (1968-1995?)

- Undated portrait of Huisentruit
- Born: Jodi Sue Huisentruit; June 5, 1968; Long Prairie, Minnesota, U.S.
- Disappeared: June 27, 1995 (aged 27); Mason City, Iowa, U.S.
- Status: Missing for 31 years, 4 months and 14 days; Declared legally dead in May 2001
- Education: St. Cloud State University
- Occupation: Television news anchor

Jodi Sue Huisentruit (/ˈhuːzɪnˌtruːt/; born June 5, 1968 – c. June 27, 1995) was an American television news anchor who worked for KIMT in Mason City, Iowa. In the early morning of June 27, 1995, a colleague called her at home when she failed to arrive for work. Huisentruit answered the call and said that she had overslept and was on her way. Signs of a struggle outside Huisentruit's apartment near her car led investigators to believe she had been abducted. Despite extensive investigations, no definitive clues to her disappearance were found, and Huisentruit was declared legally dead in 2001.

== Early life ==
Jodi Sue Huisentruit was born on June 5, 1968, and raised in Long Prairie, Minnesota, the youngest daughter of Maurice Nicholas Huisentruit and Imogene L. "Jane" Huisentruit. She excelled at golf in high school and won the state Class A tournament along with her team in 1985 and 1986. After high school, Huisentruit enrolled at Moorhead State University and later transferred to St. Cloud State University, where she studied mass communications and speech communication, graduating with a bachelor's degree in 1990. Her first job after graduation was as a flight attendant with Northwest Airlines.

Huisentruit began her broadcasting career with CBS affiliate KGAN in Cedar Rapids, Iowa, as the station's Iowa City bureau chief, then returned to Minnesota for a job at ABC affiliate KSAX in Alexandria. Huisentruit later returned to Iowa for her position at small CBS affiliate KIMT in Mason City, with service reaching as far as Southeast Minnesota.

== Disappearance ==
The day before her disappearance, Huisentruit participated in a golf tournament. According to Mason City resident John Vansice, she then went to his house to view a homemade videotape of a birthday celebration that he had arranged for her earlier that month.

At 4:10 a.m. on Tuesday, June 27, 1995, KIMT producer Amy Kuns noticed that Huisentruit had failed to report to work as scheduled and called her apartment. When Huisentruit answered the telephone, she explained that she had overslept and that she was preparing to leave for the station. However, by 6:00 a.m., Huisentruit had still not arrived, so Kuns filled in for her on the morning show Daybreak. At 7:13 a.m., KIMT staff called the Mason City police.

When police arrived at Huisentruit's apartment, they found a red Mazda Miata in the parking lot that she was planning on buying, as well as evidence that suggested a struggle had taken place near the car. Her personal items, including a bent car key and her red high heels, were strewn about the area, and police reported recovering an unidentified palm print from a pole nearby.

== Investigation ==
Investigators interviewed at least three neighbors at Huisentruit's apartment complex who said that they had heard screams around the time that she would have likely been leaving for work. A nearby neighbor also reported seeing a white Ford Econoline idling in the parking lot at about the same time.

In September 1995, the Huisentruit family hired private investigators from McCarthy & Associates Investigative Services in Minneapolis, who in turn enlisted the assistance of Omaha private investigator Doug Jasa. McCarthy and Jasa appeared on several national television shows, including America's Most Wanted and Unsolved Mysteries. Two months later, they and members of Huisentruit's family traveled to Los Angeles to meet with three prominent psychics. This meeting was televised and served as the pilot for the Psychic Detectives television show. Although each show generated several leads, none resulted in concrete evidence nor identification of a suspect.

In May 1996, approximately 100 volunteers searched an area of Cerro Gordo County and left flags to mark anything that appeared suspicious. Each of these sites was then re-examined by law enforcement, but no promising evidence was located. Police and private investigators have conducted more than 1,000 interviews, but none of then have resulted in conclusive evidence pointing to a suspect. Huisentruit was declared legally dead in May 2001.

=== Since 2000 ===
In 2003, FindJodi.com was created by Minnesota television journalists Josh Benson and Gary Peterson with the goal to keep the case in the spotlight and for the website to serve as a clearinghouse for tips that might lead to Huisentruit.

When new cases arise that appear to bear similarities with Huisentruit's, or whenever remains are discovered in the area, speculation quickly leads to a connection with the missing reporter. However, no suspect has been identified and all uncovered remains to date have proven to be from other sources. In 2005, many media outlets, including 20/20, again focused on the story as the tenth anniversary of Huisentruit's disappearance approached.

In early June 2008, photocopies of the 84 pages of Huisentruit's personal journal were anonymously mailed to a local newspaper. The Mason City Globe Gazette received the material in a large envelope with no return address and a June 4 postmark from Waterloo, Iowa. The original journal has been in the possession of law enforcement since the investigation began. Within days, the Mason City Police Department (MCPD) reported that the sender had come forward and was identified as Cheryl Ellingson, the wife of former MCPD Chief David Ellingson.

The MCPD gave no motive for why David Ellingson had taken a copy of evidence home when he left office, and no motive as to why Cheryl Ellingson interfered in the investigation by sending it to the newspaper.

In May 2015, all 100 members of the Iowa House of Representatives signed a letter requesting Mason City to declare June 27, 2015, as Jodi Huisentruit Day in honor of her memory and that of all victims in unsolved cases. This was ultimately declined. In a December 2016 opinion piece for The N'West Iowa Review, retiring state representative John Kooiker of Sioux County described his experience with the case as a member of the Iowa State House Public Safety Committee and suggested a coverup by Mason City officials.

In March 2017, a search warrant was executed against a person of interest named John Vansice, seeking GPS data for two of his vehicles. In 2018, 48 Hours aired an episode on Huisentruit's disappearance, featuring Vansice in "never-before-seen footage".

The reason for the attention was never explained by authorities, and the fact that Vansice had even been looked at was not revealed until leaked in 2018; Vansice, who was never charged for any aspect of the disappearance, died in December 2024.

As of 2020, the MCPD and the Iowa Division of Criminal Investigation were still actively investigating Huisentruit's disappearance. That same year, Findjodi.com launched a podcast by the same name in order to gain a new audience to share information on the case and generate new leads. In 2022, ABC's 20/20 debuted a new special titled "Gone at Dawn" overviewing the disappearance and interviewing those close with the case. This episode was the third time 20/20 featured the Huisentruit case.

In February 2023, former media consultant turned private investigator Steve Ridge – who started investigating the case in 2019 – announced that he was personally offering a US$25,000 (equivalent to $26,400 in 2025) reward for information that leads to the recovery of Huisentruit's remains – even if an arrest is never made; in September 2023, he increased the reward to $50,000. In December 2025, the reward was doubled to $100,000, effective through June 27, 2026, 31 years after she went missing.

In early October 2024, a year after offering a reward for information leading to Huisentruit's body, private investigator Ridge reported that Jodi had had a new boyfriend immediately before her disappearance; the couple had been in contact daily or near daily since they had begun dating 10 days or so before the abduction. Ridge believed this new boyfriend may have created jealousy and led to Jodi's abduction.

In mid-October 2024, the MCPD searched a wooded site in rural Winsted, Minnesota that was scheduled to be the location of an apartment complex, after what was reported to have been an anonymous tip.

On July 15, 2025, Hulu released a three-part documentary series, Her Last Broadcast: The Abduction of Jodi Huisentruit. While the series dispels many rumors and erroneous media reports about the case, it chooses to focus attention on four persons of interest, none of whom the MCPD have found evidence against, none of them having ever been elevated to the status of suspects despite 30 years of police work, including: serial rapist Tony Jackson, who lived two blocks from the KIMT broadcast studios at the time; Brad Millerbernd, the ex-husband of Huisentruit's childhood best friend, with the documentary revealing that the wooded site searched in Winsted, Minnesota in October 2024 was adjacent to a house that Millerbernd had previously owned; and suspected serial killer Christopher Revak, whose girlfriend lived in Mason City at the time. The series also included an admission from the officer who had requested the warrant in 2017 to place GPS trackers on the vehicles of the first person of interest, John Vansice, explaining that he had invited Vansice in for an interview and, as an investigative technique, had hoped that the trackers might have shown a spooked Vansice – if he was the abductor – going to a possible burial site. No such evidence resulted, and the officer reiterated that Vansice never became a suspect and was never charged.

On November 20, 2025, Mason City Police were again summoned to Winsted, Minnesota to continue their investigation, not to follow up on an additional tip as was previously reported. A house that was an area of interest and not available during a previous search was demolished, prompting police to check into the area. Mason City police investigator Sergeant Terrance Prochaska released the following statement: "On November 20, 2025, Mason City Police conducted a search of property in Winsted, Minnesota as part of the continued investigation into the disappearance of Jodi Huisentruit. This was not a result of a new tip in the investigation. Investigators checked an area where a residence had been recently demolished that was not accessible during a previous visit. A K-9 was used as part of this search. Nothing of significance was located. This is an open investigation, MCPD has no further comment at this time. Sergeant Terrance Prochaska, MCPD."

== See also ==
- Killing of Jennifer Servo
- Anne Pressly
- List of people who disappeared mysteriously (1990s)
