= WQOW =

Television station in Eau Claire, Wisconsin

Semi-satellite of WXOW, La Crosse, Wisconsin
- Eau Claire, Wisconsin; United States
- Channels: Digital: 25 (UHF); Virtual: 18
- Branding: WQOW 18; 18 News

Programming
- Affiliations: 18.1: ABC; for others, see § Subchannels

Ownership
- Owner: Allen Media Group; (La Crosse TV License Company, LLC)
- Sister stations: WXOW, WAOW/WMOW, WKOW, KIMT

History
- First air date: September 22, 1980
- Former channel numbers: Analog: 18 (UHF, 1980–2009); Digital: 15 (UHF, 2009–2018)
- Former affiliations: The CW (18.2, 2006−2021)
- Call sign meaning: sister to Madison's WKOW

Technical information
- Licensing authority: FCC
- Facility ID: 64550
- ERP: 253 kW
- HAAT: 280 m (919 ft)
- Transmitter coordinates: 44°48′0″N 91°27′57″W

Links
- Public license information: Public file; LMS
- Website: www.wqow.com

WQOW (channel 18) is a television station licensed to Eau Claire, Wisconsin, United States, serving as the ABC affiliate for the Chippewa Valley. Owned by Allen Media Group, the station maintains studios on Friedeck Road (WIS 93) in Eau Claire, while its transmitter is located at the WEAU facilities in nearby Altoona, Wisconsin.

Although identifying as a separate station in its own right, WQOW is considered a semi-satellite of WXOW. It carries most of WXOW's syndicated programming but airs its own commercials, identifications, local newscasts, severe weather cut-ins, and Sunday religious programs. The station also maintains an independent web and social media presence. WQOW serves the northern portion of the La Crosse and Eau Claire media market, while WXOW covers the southern area. Although WQOW maintains its own facilities, some functions such as master control and other technical operations are handled by WXOW's studio near La Crescent, Minnesota. The two stations are reported as one for ratings purposes. As of October 2025, DirecTV, Dish Network, and most vMVPD providers carry both WXOW and WQOW.

== History ==
WQOW signed on for the first time on September 22, 1980; the station was originally owned by Liberty Television, which had acquired WXOW two years earlier. For its first decade on the air, WXOW had been hampered by an inadequate signal in the northern half of the combined market, and cable viewers watched ABC from the Minneapolis–Saint Paul market (by sign-on, this was KSTP-TV). Unlike the area's other stations, WXOW's transmitter is located alongside its studios in La Crescent, Minnesota. As a result, viewers in Eau Claire and the Chippewa Valley could only watch the station on cable.

Its original studios were on Business US 53 (Hastings Way) east of the London Square Mall and then-current interchange with WIS 93 on the southeast side of Eau Claire. Originally, WQOW was a straight simulcast of WXOW, except for identifications and commercials. However, since 1982, it has evolved into a more localized station. In 1985, WQOW was acquired by Tak Communications, which would file for Chapter 11 bankruptcy six years later. A group of creditors seized Tak's assets in 1994, and the company's Wisconsin stations were purchased by Shockley Communications in 1995 as part of Tak's liquidation.

Since the new US 53 Bypass was set to be constructed on the site of WQOW's building, the station moved in January 2001, six months before it was acquired by Quincy Media (then known as Quincy Newspapers). The old building's site is located approximately in the northbound lane of the bypass near the WIS 93 northbound bridge. The new building is on WIS 93 immediately south of I-94 on the south side of Eau Claire.

WQOW/WXOW began operating a cable-only affiliate of The WB, known as "WBCZ", in 1998. It would be replaced with new second digital subchannels (simulcasting The CW) when it launched in the fall of 2006. After The CW Plus national service was upgraded to 720p high definition level in 2012, an HD feed became available on Charter digital channel 610. WQOW began airing solely in digital, effective February 17, 2009, with the analog transmitter operating for sixty additional days broadcasting only local news and information about the digital transition.

In July 2009, Dish Network announced it would add WQOW to its local channel lineup in the Eau Claire area after previously only offering WXOW. WQOW/WXOW launched This TV simulcast on new digital third digital subchannels of the stations in February/March 2010. Following the collapse of WEAU's tower on March 22, 2011, WQOW temporarily discontinued This TV on 18.3 to provide space to broadcast WEAU temporarily on its subchannel until a new tower was erected. This TV returned to WXOW and WQOW after 10 years in August 2021.

In January 2021, Gray Television announced its intent to purchase Quincy Media for $925 million. As Gray already owns the market's WEAU, it planned to keep that station and sell both WQOW and WXOW in order to satisfy Federal Communications Commission requirements. On April 29, Gray announced that WQOW and WXOW would be divested to Allen Media Broadcasting. The sale was completed on August 1; on that day, WEAU assumed the CW and MeTV affiliations from WQOW/WXOW.

On June 1, 2025, amid financial woes and rising debt, Allen Media Group announced that it would explore "strategic options" for the company, such as a sale of its television stations (including WQOW/WXOW).

== Programming ==
WQOW is a part of the Green Bay Packers and WIAA sports networks; the former allows the station to carry Packers preseason games and official team programming, and to brand itself as "Your Official Packers Station" for the Eau Claire market.

=== Newscasts ===
With the launch of WQOW, WXOW began to simulcast its newscasts on that station; one of the few splits between La Crosse and Eau Claire at launch was that WQOW produced cut-ins during Good Morning America. In Eau Claire, reporters were stationed to provide coverage on WXOW's regional news, seen in both cities.

In 1982, WQOW established a separate news operation with local newscasts focusing on Eau Claire and the surrounding area. Since it did not operate an in-house weather department of its own, all segments originated from WXOW's studios in a tape-delayed arrangement. The effort was canceled in March 1990 as a cost-cutting measure; as a result, WQOW once again began simulcasting WXOW's newscasts.

It would not be until October 14, 1996, after the Shockley purchase, that WQOW would relaunch its own local news operation for a second time. Although this incarnation of news production includes a separate weather department from WXOW, meteorologists from that station can fill in on WQOW (this is the case especially on weekends and for severe weather coverage transitioning between each station's coverage area). In September 2011, WQOW (and WXOW) became the second television stations in the market to perform an upgrade to high definition newscast production. Included in the change was a new studio and updated graphics package.

== Subchannels ==
The station's signal is multiplexed:

Subchannels of WQOW
Channel	Res.	Short name	Programming
18.1	720p	WQOWABC	ABC
18.2	480i	Catchy	Catchy Comedy
18.3	480i	MeTOONS	MeTV Toons
18.4	720p	CourtTV	Court TV
18.5	480i	Crime	True Crime Network
