= NBC Rochester =

NBC Rochester and NBC 10 Rochester may refer to:

- WHEC-TV in Rochester, New York
- KTTC in Rochester, Minnesota
