= CBS Rochester =

CBS Rochester may refer to:

- WROC-TV in Rochester, New York
- KIMT in Rochester, Minnesota
