= KXLT-TV =

Television station in Rochester, Minnesota

- Rochester–Austin–Albert Lea, Minnesota; Mason City, Iowa; United States
- City: Rochester, Minnesota
- Channels: Digital: 26 (UHF); Virtual: 47
- Branding: Fox 47

Programming
- Affiliations: 47.1: Fox; for others, see § Subchannels

Ownership
- Owner: Gray Media; (Gray Television Licensee, LLC)
- Sister stations: KTTC

History
- Founded: December 22, 1982
- First air date: August 13, 1987
- Former call signs: KXLT (1987–1989)
- Former channel numbers: Analog: 47 (UHF, 1987–2009); Digital: 46 (UHF, 2004–2018)
- Former affiliations: All as satellite of KXLI/KPXM: Independent (1987–1988); Dark (1988–1990); Star Television Network (1990–1991); Independent / HSN (1991–1996); inTV (1996–1998)
- Call sign meaning: Derived from former sister station KXLI in St. Cloud

Technical information
- Licensing authority: FCC
- Facility ID: 35906
- ERP: 108 kW
- HAAT: 343 m (1,125 ft)
- Transmitter coordinates: 43°38′34″N 92°31′36″W
- Translator(s): K30QY-D Mason City, IA

Links
- Public license information: Public file; LMS
- Website: kttc.com/fox47/

KXLT-TV (channel 47) is a television station in Rochester, Minnesota, United States, serving as the Fox affiliate for Southeast Minnesota and Northern Iowa. It is owned by Gray Media alongside NBC/CW+ affiliate KTTC (channel 10). The two stations share studios in Rochester on Bandel Road Northwest along US 52. KXLT-TV's transmitter is located in Grand Meadow Township, Minnesota, with a translator in Mason City, Iowa.

Channel 47 was originally a satellite station of KXLI in St. Cloud, Minnesota, a regional independent station, and later an outlet for the Star Television Network, home shopping, and infomercials. Shockley Communications purchased KXLT in 1997 and relaunched it as a Fox affiliate for southern Minnesota. KTTC assumed KXLT's operations in 2001 when the remainder of Shockley was acquired by Quincy Media, adding a local newscast to channel 47's schedule, with KXLT remaining under separate ownership until 2025.

== History ==
=== KXLI satellite ===
KXLT signed on for the first time on August 13, 1987, as a full-time satellite of St. Cloud–based independent outlet KXLI. It was the market's first independent station, as well as the area's first new commercial station in 33 years. Its programming consisted mostly of low-budget syndicated fare and cartoons, though for a time it also aired Minnesota North Stars hockey. However, it struggled, partially because KMSP-TV and KITN-TV, two independent stations from Minneapolis–Saint Paul, were both already available on cable.

KXLI and KXLT were owned by Halcomm Inc., whose majority stockholder and president was Dale W. Lang, who is also the chairman of magazine publisher Lang Communications Inc. Lang and several partners attempted to create the "Minnesota Independent Network" (MIN) with 11 stations, but this was never realized. Lang gave Halcomm a $9.6 million loan, and when KXLI and KXLT closed down in December 1988, Lang called the loan a year later to take possession of the stations.

In 1989, Lang became the primary investor in a new television network, the Star Television Network, which featured four hours of infomercials and eight hours of classic programming under the TV Heaven banner. KXLT returned on September 29, 1990, again simulcasting KXLI programming as an owned and operated Star station, with both stations on the air 22 hours a day. Following the closure of Star in January 1991, KXLI and KXLT implemented a schedule of infomercials, religious programming, and the Home Shopping Network.

As a KXLI satellite, KXLT operated at lower-than-licensed power due to KXLI's financial problems. KXLI and KXLT were sold to Paxson Communications in 1996, which converted both stations to an all-infomercial format under Paxson's "inTV" network. In 1997, Paxson sold KXLT to raise money to launch the Pax network (today's Ion Television). Late that year, Shockley Communications purchased KXLT.

=== Fox affiliate ===
On January 19, 1998, Shockley relaunched the station as a Fox affiliate. Previously, cable systems on the Minnesota side of the market carried WFTC (and before it KMSP), while those on the Iowa side carried KDSM-TV from Des Moines. Shockley invested in the station, upgrading it to full-power operations and moving to new studios in November of that year. On November 1, 1998, in partnership with The WB, KXLT established a cable-only affiliate of the network. Known by the faux calls "KWBR", the station was programmed by the national The WB 100+ service, but local promotion and advertising sales were handled by KXLT.

In 2001, Shockley Communications was bought by Quincy Newspapers, owner of KTTC. However, Quincy could not buy KXLT due to Federal Communications Commission (FCC) rules governing duopolies. The FCC does not allow two of the four highest-rated stations to be owned by one company. Additionally, Rochester–Austin–Mason City has only six full-power stations, not enough to legally permit a duopoly in any case. Nevertheless, Quincy took over KXLT's operations under a shared services agreement. As part of the arrangement, Quincy provided all technical support, promotions, commercial production, and master control for KXLT. Shockley would later sell the station to SagamoreHill Broadcasting in 2005.

In September 2006, The WB and UPN merged to create The CW. KTTC subsequently established a new second digital subchannel to offer The CW through The CW Plus, a similar national programming service to The WB 100+. At that point, the "KWBR" operation was shut down. KXLT has been digital-only since February 17, 2009, with it remaining on-air for a few more days airing "nightlight" service. KXLT's digital facility on channel 46 was fully operational from 2004 until 2018, when the station relocated to channel 26 in the repack.

On January 9, 2025, Gray Media, which assumed the KXLT SSA through its purchase of Quincy Media, announced it would buy the station outright for $490,000. Gray applied for a failing station waiver. The sale was completed on March 21.

== News operation ==
Through a news share agreement in place since 2001, KTTC produces a half-hour prime time newscast on KXLT seen Sunday through Friday nights. Known as Fox 47 News at Nine, the program originates from a secondary set at the Bandel Road Northwest studios. It features a unique graphics package and news music theme that is different from KTTC. KXLT uses most of the NBC outlet's on-air personnel, but maintains separate news anchors who can report for KTTC.

In 2009, CBS affiliate KIMT (channel 3) added the market's second prime time local news show at 9 to its MyNetworkTV-affiliated second digital subchannel. This newscast could be seen for thirty minutes, competing with KXLT's broadcast. Eventually, the effort would be reduced to a five-minute weather cut-in featuring an updated forecast. On March 21, 2011, a day after KTTC performed an upgrade to high definition news production, KXLT completed the switch. With the change to High-definition television came an updated set of graphics (still separate from the NBC station).

On July 28, 2014, KXLT debuted a weekday morning show known as Fox in the Morning (which is produced by KTTC). Airing for thirty minutes at 8 a.m., the program is formatted with news, weather, local features, and entertainment segments. Fox in the Morning is the area's only 8 a.m. newscast. Nicholas Quallich, anchor, and Ted Schmidt, meteorologist, have been with the show since its summer 2014 premiere. In June 2015, Tori Bokios, who joined channel 47 in January 2015, became the anchor of Fox 47 News at Nine. Amanda Hari is the newest member of the morning show, arriving in September 2015, replacing Bokios. In December 2016, Quallich left KXLT, leaving Hari and Schmidt to handle the morning news. Earlier in 2016, chief meteorologist Randy Brock left his post and went on to pursue a career in real estate. He said that part of his decision was to spend more time with his family.

On September 27, 2019, Fox in the Morning broadcast its last show, with anchor Jack Keenan and meteorologist Ted Schmidt. The 30-minute slot for the morning was used to expand Fox 47 News at Nine to a one-hour broadcast in January 2020, anchored by Maddy Wierus and chief meteorologist Nick Jansen.

The evening program on KXLT maintains its own graphics scheme and separate anchors from KTTC (except for weather segments), though the KTTC anchors do substitute when necessary. The NBC outlet also maintains an Austin bureau, within the Riverland Community College campus, on 8th Avenue Northwest.

== Subchannels ==
KXLT-TV's transmitter is located in Grand Meadow Township, Minnesota. Since October 2025, the station has also been rebroadcast by K30QY-D at Mason City, Iowa. The station's signal is multiplexed:

Subchannels of KXLT-TV
Subchannel	Res.	Short name	Programming
47.1	720p	KXLTFOX	Fox
47.2	720p	North	North Star Sports
47.3	480i	H&I	Heroes & Icons
47.4	480i	Mystery	Ion Mystery
47.5	480i	Quest	Quest
47.6	480i	CourtTV	Court TV
47.7	480i	Laff	Laff
