= Allen Media Group =

American media company

Allen Media Group Entertainment Studios
- Formerly: CF Entertainment (1993–2003); Entertainment Studios (2003–2022)
- Type: Private
- Industry: Media; Entertainment
- Predecessor: BYCA Productions
- Founded: 1993; 33 years ago
- Founder: Byron Allen
- Headquarters: Century City, Los Angeles, California, United States
- Key people: Byron Allen (chairman, CEO)
- Services: Television production; Television syndication; Broadcasting; Film distribution
- Total assets: $1 billion (2017)
- Owner: Byron Allen
- Number of employees: 2,200 (2024)
- Divisions: Entertainment Studios Motion Pictures; Entertainment Studios Networks
- Subsidiaries: Allen Media Broadcasting; Freestyle Releasing; TheGrio; The Weather Channel
- Website: allenmedia.tv

Allen Media Group, commonly referred to as AMG and alternatively known by its former name of Entertainment Studios, is an American media and entertainment company based in Los Angeles. Owned and founded in 1993 by businessman Byron Allen, the company was initially involved in the production and distribution of first-run television series for American television syndication. Under the Entertainment Studios Networks division, it also operates a group of digital cable and satellite channels, which broadcast a mix of original programs and the company's syndicated content.

In the late 2010s, the company made several major expansions to its operations, including entering the film distribution market; acquiring The Weather Channel from NBCUniversal and Bain Capital; partnering with Sinclair Broadcast Group to operate the regional sports network chain Bally Sports via Diamond Sports Group; and its acquisition of television stations from another minority-owned media group, Bayou City Broadcasting.

== History ==
With television experience as being a former co-host of the NBC series Real People from 1979 until 1984, stand-up comedian Byron Allen launched his own weekly syndicated late-night talk show, The Byron Allen Show, in 1989. It was produced by his BYCA Productions and Allbritton Communications, and distributed by Genesis Entertainment.

By 1991, Allen had created BYCA Television Distribution to take over distribution of his talk show as well as syndicate other programs. By early 1993, Allen's talk show, which became a weeknight strip the previous fall, had been cancelled, and BYCA Television Distribution had been embroiled in a lawsuit filed by former employees who claimed they had not been paid by Allen. Amidst the legal and financial issues, creditors forced BYCA into Chapter 7 bankruptcy. The same year, Allen founded CF Entertainment. Following a similar business model to BYCA, Allen was able to succeed where he had failed before by focusing on producing low-cost, syndicated non-fiction programming, including interview series and court shows (largely scripted from actual testimony). Allen served as host for some of these programs. In December 2003, CF became Entertainment Studios. Entertainment Studios green-lit its first film and stage projects in December 2011, when it acquired the rights to develop a biographical film and theatrical play on the life of Sammy Davis Jr. from his daughter, Tracey Davis.

The company ventured into scripted programming in 2012, with the third-quarter launch of the sitcoms Mr. Box Office and The First Family. Both were set for 104 episodes over two years under a model of accelerated production similar to Debmar-Mercury's 10-90 Model. The two half-hour shows were picked up as a two-hour weekend primetime programming block with two episodes of each show back to back by Tribune, Weigel and CBS Television Station groups.

The company launched its eighth cable channel and first ad-supported service, Justice Central.TV, on December 10, 2012.

In 2015, the company separately sued AT&T, Comcast, and Charter Communications for racial discrimination in being biased against minority-run entertainment companies in not carrying its cable channels. AT&T settled in December with the addition of 7 of Entertainment Studios' channels added to AT&T's DirecTV lineup. Entertainment Studios added similar suits against Charter and the FCC. The Comcast case, though initially dismissed at the district court, was allowed to go forward by the Ninth Circuit; Comcast was able to successfully petition the Supreme Court to hear its case in Comcast v. National Association of African-American-Owned Media in November 2019.

In October 2015, Entertainment Studios acquired Freestyle Releasing for an undisclosed amount "said to be sealed for high-eight figures". Freestyle also had an output deal with Netflix. The Freestyle purchase was used to bolster an expansion into film distribution, via its new Entertainment Studios Motion Pictures division. Its first release, 47 Meters Down, took in $44 million in box office revenue.

In June 2016, Entertainment Studios acquired TheGrio, a news website focusing on stories of interest to African Americans.

In mid-September 2017, the company announced plans to launch an over the top sports streaming service known as Sports.tv.

On March 22, 2018, Entertainment Studios announced its intent to acquire The Weather Channel's television assets from an NBCUniversal/Bain Capital/Blackstone Inc. partnership. The actual value was undisclosed, but was reported to be around $300 million; the channel's non-television assets, which were separately sold to IBM two years prior, were not included in the sale. In September 2018, Entertainment Studios announced that it had arranged $500 million worth of credit facilities through Deutsche Bank Securities, Jefferies Financial Group, Brightwood Capital Advisors and Comerica. Allen explained that these funds were to be used for further "large-scale" acquisitions, productions, and other general expenses. In an interview with Variety, Allen stated that he was "not a seller", and that he was "one or two acquisitions away from being a fairly large company".

On May 3, 2019, it was announced that, under the subsidiary Diamond Sports Group, Entertainment Studios would be an equity and content partner in Sinclair Broadcast Group's acquisition of Fox Sports Networks (now known as Bally Sports).

On May 6, 2019, Entertainment Studios announced that it would expand into television station ownership with the $165 million acquisition of four small-market TV stations from Bayou City Broadcasting, establishing Allen Media Broadcasting. The company acquired another 11 broadcast television stations from USA TV in February 2020.

In June 2020, Comcast agreed to carry Entertainment Studios' Comedy.TV, JusticeCentral.TV, Recipe.TV, and The Weather Channel, and to retransmission consent for the Allen Media Broadcasting television stations, as part of a settlement of the Supreme Court racial discrimination lawsuit. Allen acquired This TV and Light TV from MGM in October.

In April 2021, Allen acquired seven television stations from Gray Television, expanding the company's portfolio to 23 ABC-NBC-CBS-Fox network affiliate broadcast stations across 19 markets.

In July 2022, Allen Media Group acquired Black News Channel out of bankruptcy from Shahid Khan for $11 million; it was discontinued as a separate service, with its carriage merged into TheGrio.TV.

In 2023, Allen made multiple high profile offers on legacy media assets. In September, he offered $10 billion to Disney for ABC, FX, and National Geographic Channel linear TV assets. He then made a $3.5 billion bid for Paramount's BET Media Group in December. By January 2024, Allen's offer had become a $30 billion bid for Paramount Global. When Skydance Media's offer was accepted, he attempted to increase his bid.

Beginning in late April 2024, Allen Media Group laid off about 300 employees, or around 12 percent of its staff, throughout all of its operating divisions. The company's explanation for the staff reduction is to better position themselves for further growth. In August, it was reported that Allen Media had been consistently late in making payments to network owners.

Further layoffs took place in January 2025, with announced plans to lay off nearly all meteorologists from its local television stations in favor of centralizing weather coverage at The Weather Channel. However, following public criticism of the move, AMG partially reversed course and stated that it would retain some of its local meteorologists.

In June 2025, Allen Media Group announced it would explore a sale of its 28 owned and operated broadcast TV stations. On August 8, 2025, it was announced that Gray Media would acquire 10 stations for $171 million; expecting to be completed by the fourth quarter of 2025.

On March 6, 2026, Byron Allen, owner of Allen Media Group, acquired an 11% stake in Starz Entertainment, paying $25 million for 1.8 million shares in the entertainment company.

=== McDonald's advertising suits ===
In 2021 Allen sued fast food chain McDonald's for $10 billion in federal court, alleging that the company "intentionally discriminated against Entertainment Studios and Weather Group through a pattern of racial stereotyping and refusals to contract" for advertising across its properties. This suit was dismissed in late 2021.

Allen sued McDonald's again in federal court, alleging racial discrimination. The company said the case was "about economic inclusion of African American-owned businesses in the U.S. economy. McDonald's takes billions from African American consumers and gives almost nothing back." The lawsuit alleged that Blacks represent 40% of fast food customers, but McDonald's spent just 0.3% of its $1.6 billion U.S. ad budget in 2019 on Black-owned media.

Separately, in May 2021, McDonald's publicly promised to raise its spending on Black-owned media from 2% to 5% of its ad budget by 2024. Two years later, in 2023, Allen sued McDonald's in California courts for not honoring that promise.

Both the federal suit and the state suit were settled before a scheduled federal trial in 2025 for undisclosed terms. McDonald's said it would buy ads "in a manner that aligns with its advertising strategy and commercial objectives" while Allen said "we acknowledge McDonald's commitment to investing in Black-owned media properties and increasing access to opportunity. Our differences are behind us."

== Television series distributed by Entertainment Studios ==
Entertainment Studios has historically been known for its syndicated programs, which are distributed using a bartered model that does not require stations to pay a rights fee. The company sells national advertising inventory guaranteeing an audience in aggregate across all of its programs, and shares the revenue with stations. Allen explained to Bloomberg in 2013 that this business model was attractive to stations that cannot afford to acquire programs from the syndication market, and that "we offer, across all our television shows, probably 20 million to 25 million viewers a week".

The company has employed various cost-cutting techniques, including using non-union staff, and streamlining productions to reduce their complexity—a technique that also allows it to produce programming at an accelerated pace. The studio's first production—Entertainers with Byron Allen—bypassed budget constraints by filming interviews at press junkets, using equipment that was provided by film studios for use by the media. Similarly, the company's court shows are dramatized with actors rather than arbitration-based like other popular entries in the genre; Allen explained that with this model, "we don't have the cost of airfare, hotels, security; we don't have the costs of the claims, the settlements." Entertainment Studios' first court show—America's Court with Judge Ross—reused a set from another court show that was about to be scrapped, which Allen bought from the producers for $1.

These practices have allowed some of Entertainment Studios programs to bring in sizable amounts of advertising revenue, even with clearances in lesser-viewed time slots such as late night, or without having produced new episodes in an extended period.

=== Court shows ===
- America's Court with Judge Ross
- Equal Justice with Judge Eboni K. Williams
- Justice for All with Judge Cristina Perez
- Justice for the People with Judge Milian
- Justice with Judge Mablean
- Mathis Court with Judge Mathis
- Supreme Justice with Judge Karen
- The Verdict with Judge Hatchett
- We the People with Judge Lauren Lake (originally with Gloria Allred) (2011–2012; 2022–present)

=== Sitcoms ===
- The First Family (September 2012–April 25, 2015) syndicated
- Mr. Box Office (September 2012–April 25, 2015) syndicated

=== Game shows ===
- Funny You Should Ask
- Who Wants to Date a Comedian?

=== Syndicated specials ===
- Comedy Jam
- Feel the Beat
- Happy Holidays America
- We Have a Dream

=== Talk and magazine series ===
- Beautiful Homes & Great Estates
- Career Day
- Comics Unleashed
- Designers, Fashions & Runways
- Entertainers with Byron Allen
- Global Business People
- The Gossip Queens
- Latin Lifestyles
- Kickin' It with Byron Allen
- Urban Style
- The Writer's Hot List
- The Young Icons

=== Other shows ===
- The American Athlete
- The World's Funniest Weather

== Assets ==
=== Entertainment Studios Networks ===
==== Cable and digital ====
- Automotive.TV
- Cars.TV
- Comedy.TV
- ES.TV
- MyDestination.TV
- Pets.TV
- Recipe.TV

==== Television channels ====
- Justice Central.TV, launched December 10, 2012, on AT&T U-verse's family tier.
- Weather Group
  - The Weather Channel
  - Weatherscan (closed)
  - Local Now

=== Allen Media Broadcasting ===
Allen Media Broadcasting, LLC is an American television station operating company owned by Allen Media Group. On May 6, 2019, Entertainment Studios announced that it would expand into television station ownership by acquiring the stations of Bayou City Broadcasting for $165 million, including Evansville, Indiana's WEVV-TV and WEEV-LD, and Lafayette, Louisiana's KADN-TV and KLAF-LD. The stations would operate under the new unit, Allen Media Broadcasting. The sale was completed on July 31, 2019. On October 1, 2019, Allen Media agreed to purchase 11 stations from USA Television, a subsidiary of Heartland Media, for $290 million. The sale of the Heartland stations was approved by the FCC on November 22, 2019, and it was completed on February 11, 2020.

In March 2020, Allen Media made an offer for the Tegna station group as the third known bidder. On August 17, 2020, the company announced its purchase of Hawaii ABC affiliate KITV from SJL Broadcasting for $30 million. On April 29, 2021, it was announced that Allen Media would purchase 10 stations in seven markets from Gray Television for $380 million, from a divestiture of stations owned by Quincy Media, as a condition of Gray's purchase of Quincy. These are stations where Gray already owned a station, and are mostly in the Upper Midwest. In a separate deal with Gray, announced in July, Allen acquired WJRT-TV in Flint, Michigan, while Gray retained competing WNEM-TV through its merger with Meredith Corporation's broadcasting division.

On December 15, 2021, it was announced that Allen Media would purchase WCOV-TV, WIYC and WALE-LD, all serving Montgomery, Alabama, from Woods Communications Corporation for $28.5 million, pending FCC approval; at the time, the deal was expected to close in the first half of 2022. The sale would give the stations an in-state sibling in Huntsville-based ABC affiliate WAAY-TV.

In January 2025, Allen Media Group announced its intent to outsource the local weather coverage on all of its stations to The Weather Channel, with plans for meteorologists to be either laid off or reassigned to work from TWC's Atlanta studios. These plans were quickly shelved after viewer feedback and other criticism.

On June 2, 2025, amid financial woes and rising debt, Byron Allen announced that he would explore "strategic options" for the company, including a sale of its television stations in 21 markets. Gray agreed to acquire stations in ten of these markets (KADN-TV/KLAF-LD, WAAY-TV, WCOV-TV, WEVV-TV/WEEV-LD, WFFT-TV, WLFI-TV, WREX, WSIL-TV/KPOB-TV, WTHI-TV, and WTVA) on August 8, 2025, in a combined $171 million deal. On March 23, 2026, the FCC approved the transfer of WLFI-TV, WTHI-TV, and WTVA to Gray. Gray closed on its purchase of the remaining seven stations on May 1, 2026.

==== Television stations ====
Stations are arranged in alphabetical order by state and city of license.

Stations owned by Allen Media Group
Media market	State	Station	Channel	Network affiliation	Acquired	Acquired from	Notes
Tucson	Arizona	KVOA	4	NBC	2021	Quincy Media (via Gray Media)	
Chico–Redding	California	KHSL-TV	12	CBS; The CW (.2)	2020	Heartland Media	
Chico–Redding	California	KNVN	24	NBC; Telemundo (.2)	2020	Heartland Media	(Note: Owned by Maxair Media, LLC.)
Hilo	Hawaii	KHVO	4	ABC	2021	Lilly/SJL Broadcasting	(Note: Satellite of KITV.)
Honolulu	Hawaii	KITV	4	ABC	2021	Lilly/SJL Broadcasting	
Honolulu	Hawaii	KIKU	20	Independent	2022	Lilly/SJL Broadcasting	
Wailuku	Hawaii	KMAU	4	ABC	2021	Lilly/SJL Broadcasting	
Waterloo–Cedar Rapids	Iowa	KWWL	7	NBC	2021	Quincy Media (via Gray Media)	
Flint–Saginaw	Michigan	WJRT-TV	12	ABC	2021	Gray Media	
Rochester	Minnesota	KIMT	3	CBS; MyNetworkTV (.2)	2020	Heartland Media	
Eugene	Oregon	KEZI	9	ABC	2020	Heartland Media	
Medford–Klamath Falls	Oregon	KDRV	12	ABC	2020	Heartland Media	
Medford–Klamath Falls	Oregon	KDKF	31	ABC	2020	Heartland Media	(Note: Satellite of KDRV.)
La Crosse–Eau Claire	Wisconsin	WXOW	19	ABC	2021	Quincy Media (via Gray Media)	
La Crosse–Eau Claire	Wisconsin	WQOW	18	ABC	2021	Quincy Media (via Gray Media)	(Note: Semi-satellite of WXOW.)
Madison	Wisconsin	WKOW	27	ABC	2021	Quincy Media (via Gray Media)	
Wausau	Wisconsin	WAOW	9	ABC	2021	Quincy Media (via Gray Media)	
Wausau	Wisconsin	WMOW	4	Catchy Comedy; ABC (.2)	2021	Quincy Media (via Gray Media)	(Note: Satellite of WAOW.)

==== Former stations ====
Stations are arranged in alphabetical order by state and city of license.

Stations formerly owned by Allen Media Group
Media market	State	Station	Acquired	Sold	Notes
Huntsville	Alabama	WAAY-TV	2020	2026	
Montgomery	Alabama	WALE-LD	2023	2026	
Montgomery	Alabama	WCOV-TV	2023	2026	
Montgomery	Alabama	WIYC	2023	2026	
Harrisburg–Carbondale	Illinois	WSIL-TV	2021	2026	
Rockford	Illinois	WREX	2021	2026	
Evansville	Indiana	WEVV-TV	2019	2026	
Evansville	Indiana	WEEV-LD	2019	2026	(Note: Repeater of WEVV-TV .2)
Fort Wayne	Indiana	WFFT-TV	2020	2026	
Lafayette	Indiana	WLFI-TV	2020	2026	
Terre Haute	Indiana	WTHI-TV	2020	2026	
Lafayette	Louisiana	KADN-TV	2019	2026	
Lafayette	Louisiana	KLAF-LD	2019	2026	
Tupelo–Columbus	Mississippi	WTVA	2020	2026	
Poplar Bluff	Missouri	KPOB-TV	2021	2026	(Note: Satellite of WSIL-TV.)

==== Television networks ====
The following over-the-air specialty networks were acquired by Allen Media Group from MGM Television in October 2020. As of 2025, TheGrio is the only television network left under Allen Media Group ownership.

- TheGrio, a network focusing on African-American culture.
- This TV, a network that primarily focuses on movies from the MGM library. Defunct on May 31, 2024.

=== Entertainment Studios Motion Pictures ===
Year	Release Date	Film title	Director	Gross	Ref
2017	June 16, 2017	47 Meters Down	Johannes Roberts	$44.3 million	
2017	September 22, 2017	Friend Request	Simon Verhoeven	$3.7 million	
2017	December 22, 2017	Hostiles	Scott Cooper	$40.9 million	
2018	March 9, 2018	The Hurricane Heist	Rob Cohen	$15.8 million	
2018	April 6, 2018	Chappaquiddick	John Curran	$18 million	
2019	January 11, 2019	Replicas	Jeffrey Nachmanoff	$8.1 million	
2019	August 16, 2019	47 Meters Down: Uncaged	Johannes Roberts	$22.2 million	
2019	September 20, 2019	The Wedding Year	Robert Luketic	—	
2019	November 1, 2019	Arctic Dogs	Aaron Woodley	$3.6 million	

In 2016, Entertainment Studios began to make major expansions into film distribution; at the Sundance Film Festival, the company made a surprise $20 million bid for The Birth of a Nation, losing to Fox Searchlight. In July 2016, Entertainment Studios signed a multi-year home video and on-demand distribution deal with Anchor Bay Entertainment, covering future theatrical releases by the company. The studio acquired its first film later that month, with the North American rights to 47 Meters Down from Dimension Films. At the 2017 Toronto Film Festival, Entertainment Studios also bought Chappaquiddick, Replicas, and Hostiles. Entertainment Studios aimed to distribute at least 18 films in 2018. In January of that year, on his film distribution model, Allen said:

We're chasing the studio crumbs. They don't want movies that do $40 million to $60 million. We totally will be good with those numbers, and that is what we're pursuing. Our thing is we are really big on slow roll-outs and small releases. Our philosophy—we believe in wide releases. We like to have movies that are 1,500–4,000 screens and we are chasing what the studios don't want. They're chasing much bigger. And we're going to take their crumbs and make a gourmet meal. And then eventually we'll move on to chasing more than their crumbs. But today we're chasing the crumbs.

=== Diamond Sports Group ===
Sinclair Broadcast Group and Allen Media Group previously operated Diamond Sports Group. The current entity, now known as Main Street Sports Group under new ownership, is the mass media company that operates FanDuel Sports Network--previously Bally Sports, a group of regional sports networks formerly known as the Fox Sports Networks. The company was founded in 2019 to acquire the networks from The Walt Disney Company, which was required to sell the chain as part of its acquisition of 21st Century Fox.
