= Quincy Media =

American media company (1926–2021)

Quincy Media, Inc.
- Trade name: Quincy
- Formerly: Quincy Newspapers, Inc.
- Type: Private
- Industry: Media
- Founded: June 1, 1926
- Defunct: August 2, 2021
- Fate: Newspapers spun off to Phillips Media Group; Broadcast assets acquired by Gray Television and Allen Media Broadcasting
- Successor: Gray Media
- Headquarters: 130 South Fifth Street, Quincy, Illinois, USA
- Key people: Ralph M. Oakley (President/CEO); Pete Oakley
- Owner: Oakley and Lindsay families
- Number of employees: 900+
- Website: quincymediacareers.com

Quincy Media, Inc., formerly known as Quincy Newspapers, Inc., was a family-owned media company that originated in the newspapers of Quincy, Illinois. The company's history can be traced back to 1835, when the Bounty Land Register was one of four newspapers in Illinois. Over the next century, a number of mergers followed. The company moved into radio in 1947 and began television broadcasts in 1953.

The company was owned by the Oakley and Lindsay families of Quincy.

== History ==
The corporation was formed in Quincy on June 1, 1926, as Quincy Newspapers after the merger of the Quincy Herald, direct descendant of the Illinois Bounty Land Register first published in Quincy in 1835, and the Quincy Whig-Journal, descendant of the Quincy Whig founded in 1838. The two papers were combined to form a single daily paper, the Quincy Herald-Whig.

The Herald was purchased in September 1891 by three men from Rockford, Charles L. Miller, Hedley John Eaton and Edmund Botsford. Miller had earlier founded the Rockford Daily Register, that city's oldest newspaper. Subsequently, Miller brought to the Herald his brother-in-law and nephew, respectively, Aaron Burr Oakley and Ray M. Oakley, the first two generations of the Oakleys in the newspaper business in Quincy. Miller spent four years in Quincy, returning to Rockford in 1896 to join Harry M. Johnson in ownership of the Rockford Republic. He retired as editor of the Republic in 1913 and died in 1921. Hedley Eaton retired in 1913 and died in 1936. Eaton's son John Dewitt Eaton stayed with the paper as Advertising Manager until his retirement in 1955.

Two brothers from Decatur, Frank M. Lindsay, Sr. and Arthur O. Lindsay, Sr. bought the Quincy Whig in 1915, with Arthur Lindsay taking up residence in Quincy as president and manager. Frank Lindsay remained in Decatur with the Decatur Herald and formed an association with another Illinois newspaper family, the Schaubs. In 1920, the Lindsays consolidated the Whig and The Quincy Journal, founded in 1883.

QNI entered broadcasting in 1947, the year it started Quincy's first commercial FM station, WQDI. The following year QNI purchased Quincy Broadcasting Co. to operate WGEM, the city's second AM station. WQDI became WGEM-FM in 1953.

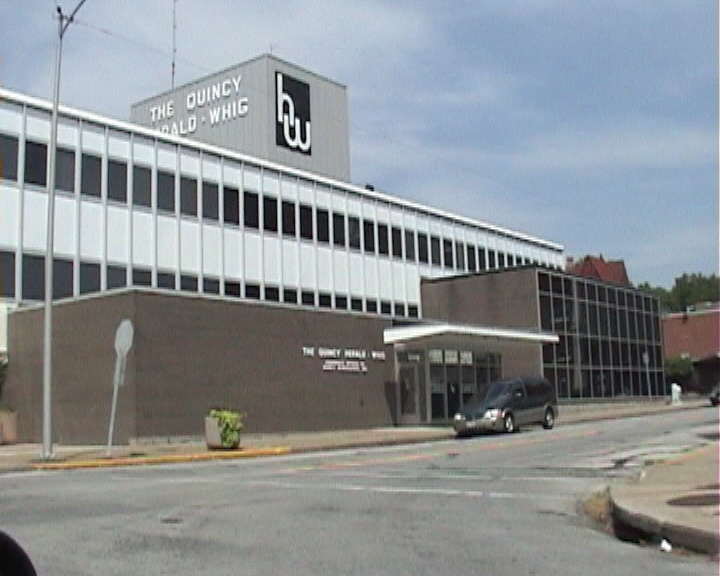
Quincy Media Corporate headquarters in Downtown Quincy

Quincy Broadcasting produced the Quincy region's first television broadcast on September 4, 1953, with the launch of WGEM-TV, the area's NBC affiliate. The building containing the ground floor studios of the WGEM stations was also the former home of the Tremont Hotel, and Quincy Media continues to operate it as the New Tremont Apartments, containing both long-term and extended stay accommodations.

In 1969, QNI and six other newspaper entities formed American Newspapers Inc., which bought The New Jersey Herald in Newton, New Jersey, converting the semi-weekly to a daily and Sunday publication in 1970. QNI acquired controlling interest in American Newspapers in 1980 and became sole owner in 1986.

Beginning in the 1970s, QNI began a major expansion into television. WSJV in Elkhart, Indiana (serving South Bend) was acquired in 1974; KROC-TV (renamed KTTC) in Rochester, Minnesota in 1976; WHIS-TV (renamed WVVA) in Bluefield, West Virginia in 1979; KTIV in Sioux City, Iowa in 1989; and WREX-TV in Rockford in 1995. All of the stations were also NBC affiliates at their acquisitions except for WSJV and WREX, which were ABC affiliates; however, in 1995, WSJV dropped ABC for Fox, and soon thereafter WREX joined NBC. Also in 1995, The Merchant, a weekly shopper in Quincy was purchased by the company.

In June 2001, QNI purchased from Shockley Communications five ABC affiliates in Wisconsin: WKOW-TV in Madison, WAOW-TV in Wausau; WYOW in Eagle River (a satellite of WAOW); WXOW-TV in La Crosse; and WQOW-TV in Eau Claire (a semi-satellite of WXOW). Also purchased from SCC at the time was ProVideo of Wisconsin, Inc. consisting of a component digital online suite and a fully integrated non-linear online suite in Madison, Wisconsin. Concurrent with the Shockley purchase, KTTC entered into a shared services agreement with KXLT-TV, the Fox affiliate in Rochester, Minnesota. KTTC provides all services for KXLT excluding sales, traffic, and programming.

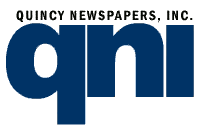
Quincy Newspapers Logo until 2012.

On July 1, 2006, QNI purchased KWWL, the NBC affiliate in Waterloo, Iowa, from Raycom Media. In February 2009, QNI purchased Crandon, Wisconsin's WBIJ from the widow of the station's founder, with the intention to operate the station as a satellite station of WAOW; QNI subsequently renamed the station WMOW to conform with its other Wisconsin properties.

On February 11, 2014, Quincy announced plans to acquire a number of small and mid-market stations from Granite Broadcasting, including WEEK-TV in Peoria, KBJR-TV in Superior, Wisconsin, KRII in Chisholm, Minnesota (a satellite of KBJR), and WBNG-TV in Binghamton, New York (the company's first CBS affiliate; WEEK and KBJR/KRII are NBC affiliates). As part of the deal, Quincy originally planned to purchase WPTA, the ABC affiliate in Fort Wayne, Indiana, from Malara Broadcast Group, and provide services to ABC affiliate WHOI and MyNetworkTV affiliate WAOE in Peoria, NBC affiliate WISE-TV in Fort Wayne, and CBS affiliate KDLH in Duluth, Minnesota. In November 2014, the deal was reworked so that Quincy would acquire WISE and provide services to WPTA, retaining the arrangement between the stations established by Granite. In July 2015, the deal was reworked yet again; Quincy would, yet again, acquire WPTA instead of WISE, and Malara's stations would be acquired by SagamoreHill Broadcasting. Quincy also proposed to wind down its shared services agreements with WISE and KDLH within nine months of the sale's completion: both stations would move their existing network affiliations to WPTA and KBJR, and become independently operated stations airing The CW. On September 15, 2015, the FCC approved the deal.

In 2015, the company's flagship title dropped Quincy from its masthead and became simply the Herald-Whig. In 2016, the Herald-Whig and Quincy Media applied for a demolition permit for the historic Morgan-Wells House in Quincy for expansion of their offices. The NRHP-listed local landmark was the home of notable Quincy residents and institutions for over a century, now demolished.

In January 2016, the company changed its name to Quincy Media.

On May 21, 2018, it was announced that Quincy Media would acquire KDLH outright for $792,557 and WISE for $952,884. While the FCC normally prohibits one company from owning two television licenses in the same market when both are among the top four rated stations, Quincy submitted a filing saying that during the November 2017 "sweeps" period KBJR-TV was the top ranked station while KDLH placed fifth, and that WPTA was the second ranked station while WISE-TV placed fifth. The sale was completed on August 1.

On August 29, 2018, Quincy Media's stations were pulled from Dish Network after failing to reach a new retransmission fee agreement. On October 12, Quincy Media reached a new agreement with Dish Network to continue carrying Quincy Media stations.

On October 29, 2018, Quincy announced it would be acquiring KVOA in Tucson, Arizona, from Cordillera Communications for $70 million as a side deal of the latter company's acquisition by the E. W. Scripps Company. Two days later, on October 31, Quincy announced that it would be acquiring WSIL-TV in Harrisburg, Illinois and KPOB, Poplar Bluff, MO, from Mel Wheeler, Inc. for $24.5 million.

On May 10, 2019, Quincy announced it would purchase the Hannibal Courier-Post from GateHouse Media, marking its first daily newspaper expansion since 1969. Six days later, on May 16, Quincy announced the sale of the New Jersey Herald to GateHouse Media, ending Quincy's 50-year ownership of the paper.

On January 7, 2021, television industry news website FTVLive obtained an internal memo from President and CEO Ralph Oakley confirming that Quincy Media had put itself up for sale. The news was later publicly confirmed by QMI.

On February 1, 2021, Gray Television announced that it had entered into an agreement to acquire all Quincy Media television properties for $925 million in a cash transaction, along with the WGEM AM/FM radio stations in Quincy (Gray owned one small radio station in Texas otherwise, also acquired as part of another television group). As a result, several Quincy stations will be divested to be in compliance with regulations from the FCC and the Department of Justice. On April 29, it was announced that Allen Media Group will purchase 10 Quincy stations not being acquired by Gray Television for $380 million. The newspapers were sold to another family-owned publishing company, Phillips Media Group of Harrison, Arkansas, in a separate transaction. The transaction was completed on August 2.

== Former properties ==
=== Newspapers ===
- Herald-Whig, Quincy, Illinois - now owned by Carpenter Media Group.
- Hannibal Courier-Post, Hannibal, Missouri - now owned by Carpenter Media Group.

=== Television and radio ===
- Stations are arranged in alphabetical order by state and city of license.
- Two boldface asterisks appearing following a station's call letters (**) indicate a station built and signed on by Quincy.

Stations owned and/or operated by Quincy Media
Media market	State	Station	Purchased	Sold	Notes
Tucson	Arizona	KVOA	2019	2021	
Harrisburg–Carbondale	Illinois	WSIL-TV	2019	2021	
Peoria	Illinois	WHOI	2015	2016	(Note: Owned by a third party and operated by Quincy.)
Peoria	Illinois	WEEK-TV	2015	2021	
Quincy	Illinois	WGEM **	1948	2021	
Quincy	Illinois	WGEM-FM **	1947	2021	(Note: Known as WQDI from 1947 to 1953.)
Quincy	Illinois	WGEM-TV **	1953	2021	
Rockford	Illinois	WREX	1995	2021	
Fort Wayne	Indiana	WISE-TV	2018	2021	
Fort Wayne	Indiana	WPTA	2015	2021	
South Bend	Indiana	WSJV	1975	2021	
Sioux City	Iowa	KTIV	1989	2021	
Waterloo–Cedar Rapids	Iowa	KWWL	2006	2021	
Chisholm	Minnesota	KRII-TV	2015	2021	(Note: Satellite of KBJR-TV.)
Duluth	Minnesota	KBJR-TV	2015	2021	
Duluth	Minnesota	KDLH	2018	2021	
Rochester	Minnesota	KTTC	1976	2021	
Rochester	Minnesota	KXLT-TV	2001	2021	
Poplar Bluff	Missouri	KPOB-TV	2019	2021	(Note: Satellite of WSIL-TV.)
Binghamton	New York	WBNG-TV	2015	2021	
Bluefield–Beckley	West Virginia	WVVA	1979	2021	
Crandon	Wisconsin	WMOW	2009	2021	(Note: Satellite of WAOW.)
Eagle River	Wisconsin	WYOW	2001	2021	(Note: Currently a satellite of WSAW-TV.)
Eau Claire	Wisconsin	WQOW	2001	2021	(Note: Semi-satellite of WXOW.)
La Crosse	Wisconsin	WXOW	2001	2021	
Madison	Wisconsin	WKOW	2001	2021	
Wausau	Wisconsin	WAOW	2001	2021	
