= Shockley Communications =

American radio and television broadcast company

- Company type: Private
- Industry: Broadcasting
- Founded: March 1985; 41 years ago
- Defunct: 2001
- Fate: Television stations and production facilities acquired by Quincy Media; Radio stations acquired by Midwest Communications
- Headquarters: Madison, Wisconsin, United States
- Total assets: 5 TV stations and 8 radio stations
- Owner: The Shockley family

Shockley Communications Corporation was a media outlet that operated eight radio stations in Wisconsin and Minnesota. Its president was Terry Shockley, who cofounded the company in 1985. It became defunct in 2001.

The television holdings include KXLT-TV, WAOW, WKOW, WXOW and WQOW.

The company was founded in March 1985 by Terry Shockley. On January 18, 2001, Quincy Newspapers announced that it would acquire the television stations and video production facilities, ProVideo and Pro-2. It was completed in June 2001. The radio stations were acquired by Midwest Communications in September 2001.
