= The American Athlete =

- Created by: Byron Allen
- Country of origin: United States
- Original language: English
- No. of seasons: 23

Production
- Executive producers: Byron Allen; Carolyn Folks; Jennifer Lucas; Brandon Tansley
- Camera setup: Digital; Multi-camera
- Running time: 22 minutes
- Production company: Entertainment Studios

Original release
- Network: First-run syndication
- Release: June 1, 1996 – present

The American Athlete is an American sports and interview television series created, owned, and previously hosted by Byron Allen. The series aired its first episode on June 1, 1996. It is filmed primarily at the Entertainment Studios Culver City facility in Los Angeles and is aired in first-run syndication on various television stations around the United States including affiliates of ABC, NBC, and CBS.

The American Athlete is a series that features documentary style interviews which focus on the journey of an athlete. Included in the show are various athletic disciplines and diverse sports personalities from around the world. Interviewees include but are not limited to: Michael Jordan, Serena Williams, Wayne Gretzky, Mia Hamm, Tiger Woods, Jimmie Johnson, Derek Jeter, Phil Jackson, Khris Middleton, Jim Brown, Laird Hamilton, and Kobe Bryant.

== Accolades ==
The American Athlete was nominated for Outstanding Arts and Pop Culture Program at the 48th Daytime Emmy Awards.
