= Morgan-Wells House =

Historic house in Illinois, United States

- U.S. National Register of Historic Places
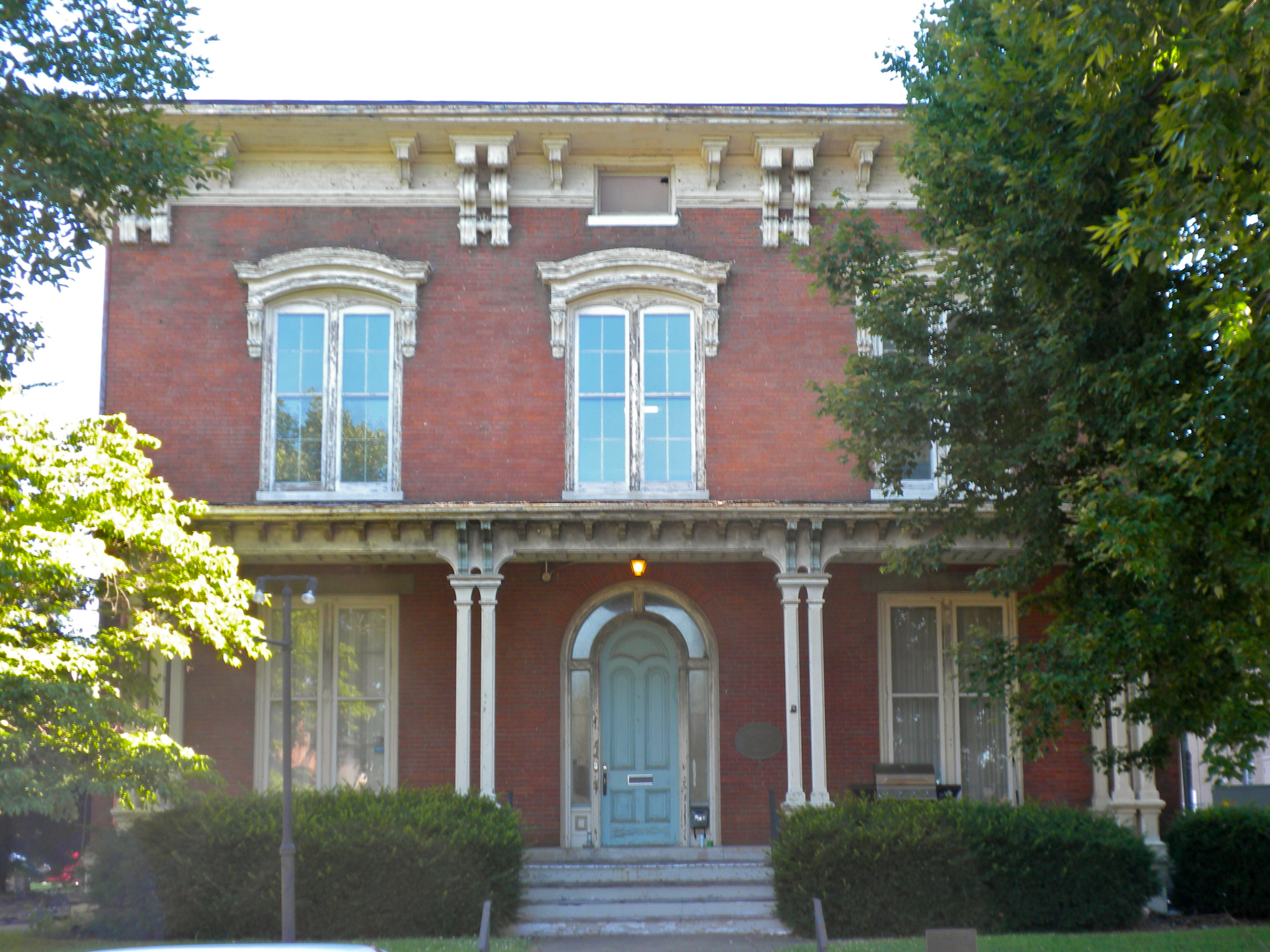
- Morgan-Wells House

- Location within Illinois Location within the United States
- Location: 421 Jersey St., Quincy, Illinois
- Coordinates: 39°55′52″N 91°24′32″W
- Area: 0.6 acres (0.24 ha)
- Built: 1855
- Architectural style: Italianate
- NRHP reference No.: 77000471
- Added to NRHP: November 16, 1977

The Morgan-Wells House, also known as the Norwood-Morgan-Wells House, was added to the United States National Register of Historic Places on November 16, 1977. The house was located at 421 Jersey Street in the Adams County city of Quincy, Illinois. This Italianate structure was built in 1860 onto another structure by Edward Wells. The original building, which was later the rear of the house, was constructed in 1853 by J.E. Norwood, a pork packer. Quincy banker Lorenzo Bull, who owned the home by 1901, gave it to the Cheerful Home Association and it became the first licensed children's home in the state of Illinois in 1901. In 1933 the YWCA purchased the home for $10.

On October 17, 2016, the Quincy City Council approved a demolition permit for the Morgan-Wells House to allow the expansion of offices for the local newspaper. The Herald-Whig subsequently took title to the house and promptly demolished it.
