= WAOW =

Television station in Wausau, Wisconsin

- Wausau, Wisconsin; United States
- Channels: Digital: 9 (VHF); Virtual: 9
- Branding: WAOW 9; 9 News WAOW

Programming
- Affiliations: 9.1: ABC; for others, see § Subchannels

Ownership
- Owner: Allen Media Group; (Wausau TV License Company, LLC)

History
- First air date: May 7, 1965
- Former channel numbers: Analog: 9 (VHF, 1965–2009); Digital: 29 (UHF, 1999–2009)
- Former affiliations: NET (select programs, 1969–1970); PBS (select programs, 1970–1972); Fox (NFL broadcasts, 1994–1999); CW+ (9.2, 2006−2021); Fox (9.3, via WFXS-DT, February−March 2009)
- Call sign meaning: "Wausau WKOW"

Technical information
- Licensing authority: FCC
- Facility ID: 64546
- ERP: 96.3 kW
- HAAT: 368 m (1,207 ft)
- Transmitter coordinates: 44°55′14.2″N 89°41′28.7″W
- Translator(s): see § Satellite stations

Links
- Public license information: Public file; LMS
- Website: waow.com

WAOW (channel 9) is a television station in Wausau, Wisconsin, United States, affiliated with ABC and owned by Allen Media Group. The station's studios are located on Grand Avenue/US 51 in Wausau, and its transmitter is located on Rib Mountain.

WAOW relays its signal on satellite station WMOW (channel 4) in Crandon, extending its range in the northeastern reaches of the market.

== History ==
WAOW signed on the air on May 7, 1965. Owned by Midcontinent Broadcasting, it served as a satellite station of Madison's WKOW as part of the Wisconsin Television Network which would later include WXOW in La Crosse and WQOW in Eau Claire. Midcontinent Broadcasting sold the stations to Horizon Communications in 1970. Liberty Television bought the stations in 1978. This station gradually increased its local programming and content, finally severing the electronic umbilical cord with WKOW in the 1980s. WAOW was one of two commercial stations in the Wausau–Rhinelander market to air Sesame Street, the other being WAEO-TV in Rhinelander, before Wisconsin's state educational TV network was extended to the region.

In 1985, Liberty Television sold the Wisconsin stations to Tak Communications. Tak filed for Chapter 11 bankruptcy protection in 1991 and would be taken over by a group of creditors less than three years later. In 1995, Shockley Communications purchased WAOW along with three sister stations (WKOW, WXOW, and WQOW) from Tak's creditors. Quincy Newspapers purchased most of the Shockley stations, including its Wisconsin sister stations in June 2001.

Between 1994 and 1999, WAOW carried the Fox network's National Football League game package, which featured most games of the home state Green Bay Packers. The arrangement was necessary due to a lack of a local, over-the-air Fox affiliate in the Wausau–Rhinelander market. (Area cable systems primarily carried Fox through the Foxnet service or through Green Bay's WGBA-TV or WLUK-TV.) WAOW's arrangement with Fox came to an end in December 1999, when the Wittenberg-licensed WFXS (channel 55) signed on to become Central Wisconsin's first full-time Fox station.

On June 25, 2002, WAOW became the first commercial television station in the Wausau–Rhinelander market to broadcast in high-definition; WYOW would join them on October 24.

WAOW/WYOW converted fully to digital on February 17, 2009, without a nightlight period for WAOW while WYOW converted after a nightlight period. The two stations carried the Retro Television Network (RTV) on a third digital subchannel until March 2009, when it was replaced with This TV. On September 1, 2015, Decades replaced This TV.

In February and March 2009, WAOW aired WFXS' digital signal temporarily on DT3 while that station ironed out problems with the activation of its digital transmitter. In early September 2009, WFXS added RTV to its third digital subchannel.

On January 7, 2021, Quincy Media announced that it had put itself up for sale. On February 1, Gray Television announced it would purchase Quincy's radio and TV properties for $925 million. As Gray already owned WSAW-TV in the Wausau–Rhinelander market, and both that station and WAOW rank among the market's top four stations, it agreed to sell WAOW in order to satisfy Federal Communications Commission requirements.

On April 29, 2021, Gray announced that WAOW and WMOW would be divested to Allen Media Broadcasting in a $380 million deal that includes, among other Quincy-owned stations, WKOW, WXOW, and WQOW. Gray, however, kept WYOW, and converted the Eagle River station into a full-power satellite of WSAW-TV, airing The CW on its main 34.1 channel and simulcasting CBS and Fox on subchannels 7.10 and 33.10, respectively.

On June 1, 2025, amid financial woes and rising debt, Allen Media Group announced that it would explore "strategic options" for the company, such as a sale of its television stations (including WAOW/WMOW). The company had also attempted to re-hub the outstate stations, including WAOW, to WKOW, including some statewide newscasts originating newscasts from Madison to reduce costs, but had returned most newscasts outside of mid-day to local control by that time.

== News operation ==
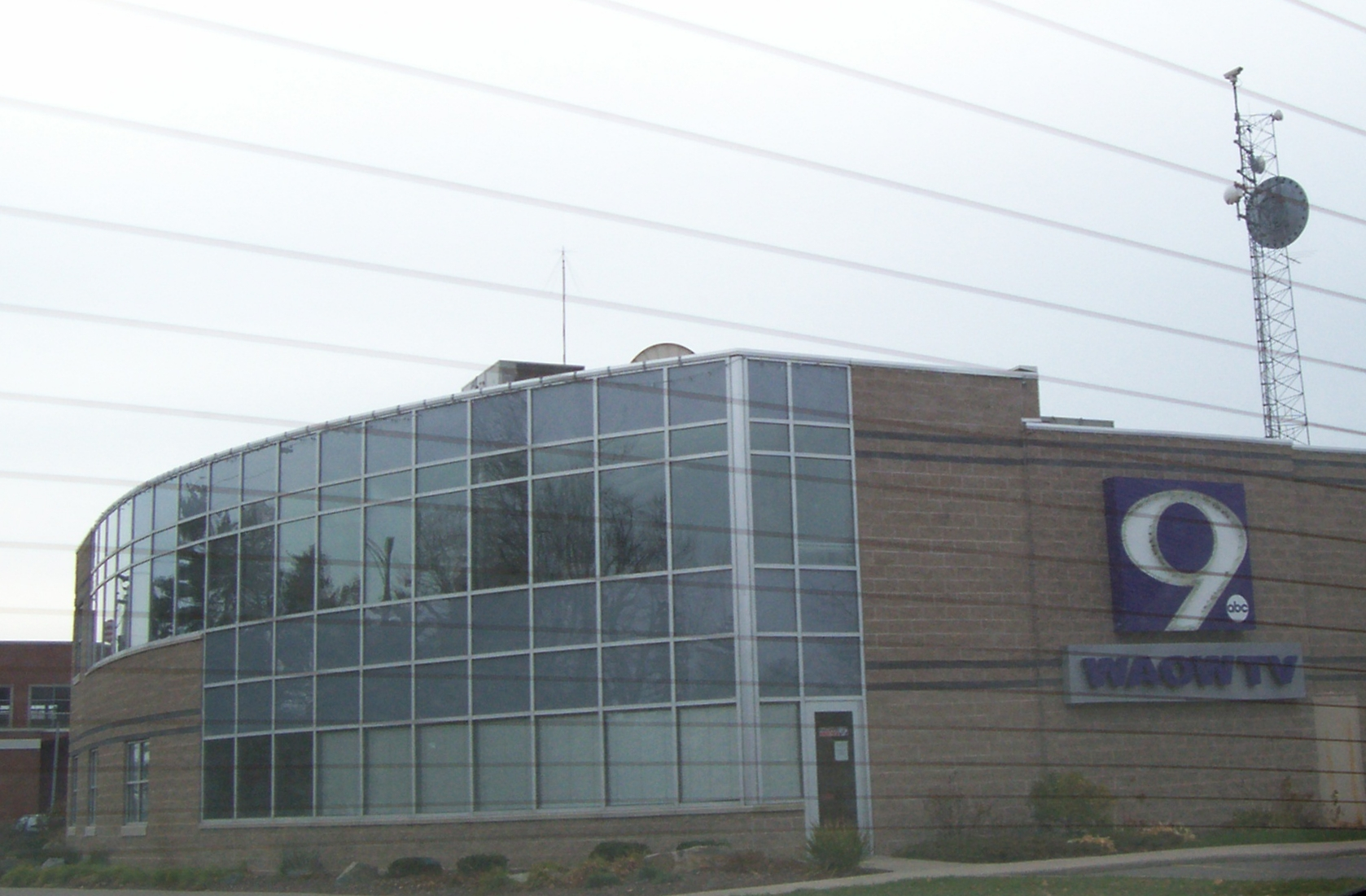
WAOW's studios.

In 2000, WAOW entered into a news share agreement with WFXS (owned by Davis Television, LLC). The arrangement resulted in a weeknight prime time newscast debuting on the Fox outlet. The broadcast, known as Fox 55 News at 9, could be seen for thirty minutes.

Although there was no weekend edition of the show, it was eventually joined by a weekday morning newscast (also produced by WAOW) on April 23, 2012. Known as Fox 55 This Morning, this program aired for an hour (from 7 to 8 a.m.) on WFXS offering a local alternative to the national morning programs seen on the big three networks. Both WFXS newscasts maintained a separate music package and graphics scheme from WAOW. The broadcasts originated from the ABC outlet's primary set at its studios but with unique duratrans indicating the Fox-branded shows. On June 19, 2011, WAOW became the market's second television outlet to upgrade local news to a high definition level. Included in the change were a redesigned set and an updated graphics scheme. Eventually, in 2012, WFXS made the transition to HD newscasts.

On July 1, 2015, concurrent with the Fox affiliation moving to low-power WZAW-LD, both of the Fox-branded newscasts were canceled after the news share arrangement was terminated. Almost a week later (on July 6), WAOW introduced its own prime time news at 9 (airing weeknights for a half-hour) on its CW digital subchannel. This broadcast, known as Newsline 9 at 9 on The CW, can also be seen through a simulcast on WMOW's main channel and WYOW-DT2.

From 1965 until mid-2025, WAOW maintained a weather beacon in the form of a sign or tower that was lit in various colors to convey the forecast for the next 12 to 24 hours. The "9" sign on the side of the WAOW studios served this purpose. A poem created by a viewer contest helps to remember the meaning of the colors:

When the Weather 9 is red; warmer weather is ahead.
When the Weather 9 is green; cooler weather is foreseen.
When the Weather 9 is white; little change is in sight.
When the Weather 9 is flashing by night or day; precipitation is on the way.

== Subchannels ==
The station's signal is multiplexed:

Subchannels of WAOW
Subchannel	Res.	Short name	Programming
9.1	720p	WAOWABC	ABC
9.2	720p	WAOWCAT	Catchy Comedy
9.3	480i	MeToons	MeTV Toons
9.4	720p	CourtTV	Court TV
9.5	480i	Crime	True Crime Network
9.6	480i		WISDOT traffic camera loop

== Satellite stations ==
In addition to its main signal, WAOW operates one satellite station, WMOW (channel 4) in Crandon, that provides additional coverage and some overlap in the northern part of the Wausau–Rhinelander market. The station also formerly operated WYOW (channel 34) in Eagle River, which was sold to Gray Television in 2021.

Neither WMOW or WYOW ever maintained a physical news presence in northern Wisconsin. However, WYOW did operate an advertising sales office on West Pine Street/WIS 17/WIS 70 in Eagle River.

During a time in the early 2000s under Quincy ownership, WYOW was identified on-air as "Northwoods 34".
