= Catchy Comedy =

American digital multicast network

- Logo used since 2023
- Type: Digital broadcast television network; (reruns)
- Country: United States
- Broadcast area: 72.64% OTA coverage and streaming
- Headquarters: Chicago, Illinois

Programming
- Picture format: 720p (HDTV; widescreen)

Ownership
- Owner: Weigel Broadcasting
- Parent: Decades National Limited Partnership
- Key people: Neal Sabin; (Vice Chairman, Weigel Broadcasting); Norman Shapiro; (President, Weigel Broadcasting)
- Sister channels: MeTV; MeTV+; MeTV Toons; Heroes & Icons; Movies!; Start TV; Story Television; WEST; Dabl

History
- Founded: October 21, 2014; 11 years ago
- Launched: January 16, 2015; 11 years ago; (soft launch); May 25, 2015; 11 years ago; (official launch); March 27, 2023; 3 years ago; (as Catchy Comedy)
- Former names: Decades (2015–2023)

Links
- Website: catchycomedy.com

Availability

Terrestrial
- See List of affiliates

Streaming media
- Service(s): Frndly TV, FuboTV, Philo

Catchy Comedy, formerly known as Decades, is an American digital broadcast television network owned by Weigel Broadcasting. The network, which is mainly carried on the digital subchannels of television stations, primarily airs classic television sitcoms from the 1950s through the 2010s. Established in 2015, the network was previously called Decades.

Through its ownership by Weigel, Catchy Comedy is a sister network to MeTV, and is carried in 480i widescreen.

Since fall 2019, the network is carried on Fox-owned stations in 12 markets as part of a multi-year agreement with Fox Television Stations, after switching from CBS-owned stations.

== History ==
On October 21, 2014, CBS Corporation and Weigel Broadcasting announced the launch of the network, then known as Decades, with plans to debut the network in 2015. Through its part-ownership by CBS Corporation, Decades announced that owned-and-operated stations of the CBS television network would serve as its initial charter network affiliates.

The network was the first national multicasting venture by CBS Television Stations. The group did not carry subchannels on any of its television stations prior to 2013. At the time of the Decades announcement, only three of its stations even maintained subchannels (CBS O&Os WCBS-TV in New York City and KYW-TV in Philadelphia carried rolling news channels under the "CBS Plus" brand on their respective secondary subchannels, while independent station KTXA in Dallas-Fort Worth, Texas carried MeTV on its second subchannel). In addition, CBS Television Distribution had already maintained a content distribution agreement with Weigel Broadcasting's classic television network MeTV, which sourced much of its programming from that library.

Decades logo, used from January 13, 2015, to March 27, 2023

On January 13, 2015, Weigel Broadcasting confirmed that its Milwaukee CBS affiliate WDJT-TV would carry the network on its fourth digital subchannel. It would replace the digital news service TouchVision.

Decades officially launched at 7:00 a.m. Eastern Time Zone on May 25, 2015, with the series premiere of Through the Decades as its inaugural telecast. At the time, the network was available in over 45% of all American households with a television set.

Times for the programming are televised across all six time zones. For example, a show that begins at 8 PM Eastern Time, begins at 5 PM Pacific Time.

On March 27, 2023, Decades rebranded as Catchy Comedy, focusing on primarily classic sitcoms and sketch comedy variety shows weekdays with comedy marathons on weekends.

== Programming ==
=== Decades (2015–2023) ===
==== Launch ====
Decades primarily relied on programming from the extensive content library owned by CBS Television Distribution, which includes the pre-2006 Paramount Television library, which CBS had acquired as a result of absorbing Paramount's syndication unit in 2006 through its split from Viacom into a separate company (CBS and Viacom re-merged to form ViacomCBS in 2019), along with series from Desilu Productions, Bing Crosby Productions, Don Fedderson Productions, QM Productions, Spelling Television and Republic Pictures Television. Decades also carried series and movies from NBCUniversal, Warner Bros., Disney (20th Century Studios), Sony Pictures, Paramount Pictures, Metro-Goldwyn-Mayer, Lionsgate, Sonar Entertainment, the Peter Rodgers Organization, Shout! Factory, The Carsey-Werner Company and the public domain.

In an early effort to stand out from other "retro TV" multicast services (such as MeTV and Antenna TV), the Monday through Friday schedule initially featured a block of programming based on a daily theme, with interstitial programs to highlight the theme. Each six-hour block of programming was repeated four times a day and typically included a feature film, episodes of theme related television programs, and biographical programs featuring celebrities, actors and actresses, musicians, athletes, and public figures of interest. The theme blocks were bookended with Through the Decades, an hour-long program hosted and narrated by Bill Kurtis (who formerly served as a presenter for Chicago CBS O&O WBBM-TV and CBS News) that explores the events and news from a particular day or period in history, using archival footage that CBS owns through services such as CBS News and CBS Television Distribution's syndicated newsmagazine program Entertainment Tonight.

As Decades, the network's Saturday and Sunday schedules featured marathons of classic television series. Beginning on Saturday at 12:00 p.m. (ET), forty-two consecutive hours are devoted to a particular series, which is usually sourced from either the CBS Television Distribution library of shows or a show Weigel Broadcasting has a contract to carry (such as one of the shows it broadcasts on MeTV).

Airings of The Dick Cavett Show were added to the schedule February 1, 2016, within the daily themed block, as appropriate. Episodes from Cavett's late-night ABC talk show from 1969 to 1974, as well as his later interview series on PBS, USA, and CNBC were all made available for airing.

On November 1, 2016, a major change was made to the programming lineup, with the daily programming block reduced to two airings daily (one from mid-morning to mid-afternoon, the other in overnight) as the 2:00 p.m. to midnight (ET) time period was converted to a "daily binge" with a different show airing each day. During the month of November, a different "cop show" was aired each weekday.

A further shift in direction from the original channel concept came on December 5, 2016, when the network added two daily airings of the NBC series Rowan & Martin's Laugh-In, the first breaking the daily binge in half at 6:00 p.m. (ET) and a different episode at the conclusion of the binge time block.

==== Through the Decades ====
Through the Decades, hosted by Bill Kurtis, is a retrospective-type show that aired on Decades. Each day's edition of the show featured events that happened on that date in history.

The show debuted in September 2016. After the network rebranded to Catchy Comedy on March 27, 2023, the program was cancelled; notably, however, Weigel would continue to use the show as an E/I compliant program on some of their independent affiliates, most notably flagship station WCIU-TV in Chicago, rerunning the episodes on the same days as original airings, before removing it the following year.

==== 2017–2023 ====
In 2017, the theme and binge programming on weekdays was discontinued altogether and the network became mostly sitcom-focused, featuring the "Television Across the Decades" block, where comedies from the 1950s through the 1980s air weekdays from mid-morning into early evening, and late evenings through the overnight hours featuring the "Smart Comedy" block, highlighted by classic sitcoms such as The Dick Van Dyke Show, Cheers, Taxi, The Honeymooners, and The Abbott and Costello Show.

While the bulk of the lineup was primarily sitcoms, there were deviations (most notably in prime time) which featured the classic variety program The Ed Sullivan Show, Through the Decades and The Dick Cavett Show. Also, the weekend binge marathons continued, with a single series (regardless of genre) airing for 42 hours straight on Saturdays and Sundays.

The final program to air under the Decades name was The Mod Squad, which was the featured show of the March 25–26, 2023, weekend binge.

=== Catchy Comedy (2023–present) ===
At 6 a.m. Eastern Time on March 27, 2023, Decades was rebranded as Catchy Comedy, primarily focusing on the broadcasting of sitcoms (with occasional broadcasts of some variety shows featuring sketch comedy), with the series premiere episode of Full House as the first program which was shown. In addition, some programs are shortened, the ending credits are compressed while the last scenes are shown. This represented a change from Decades, which showed the program without modifying them.

The weekend "binge" marathons were carried over, but they were strictly comedy-focused, and in January 2025, they were only broadcast on Sundays after the establishment of a set Saturday schedule. The binges were later discontinued in February 2026 with the establishment of a set Sunday schedule alongside adding the new block Catchy Loves Lucy, with Here's Lucy as the last binge of the weekend, airing on February 8.

The network's only deviation from comedy is its fulfillment of its FCC obligations which consists of airings of E/I programming on Saturday mornings from 9 a.m. until 11 a.m. (ET).

== Affiliates ==
At the time of its launch in May 2015, Decades had current or pending affiliation agreements with 35 television stations which covered at least 44% of the United States. Weigel Broadcasting handled the responsibility of affiliate distribution to stations outside the core CBS O&O group.

Decades was offered to stations on a barter basis, in which the network and the local affiliate shared the responsibility of selling advertising inventory and split the allocated hourly commercial time. CBS affiliates and their owners held the right of first refusal to carry the network in their local market, before it was offered to other network-affiliated stations. The network is also available on local cable television providers (most likely through their digital cable tiers, as is the case with most multicast networks) and other multichannel television in the United States at the discretion of the affiliate's parent station.

CBS Television Stations initially planned to launch Decades on all 16 CBS owned-and-operated stations (including two that operate as satellite stations of Minneapolis O&O WCCO-TV). Not all of the CBS Television Stations outlets were announced to carry Decades initially, as CW owned-and-operated stations in markets where CBS Corporation did not own the CBS affiliate (such as WTOG and KSTW) were originally excluded from its initial list of affiliates. The standalone CW O&Os were later added as charter stations by late April 2015. In the Chicago market, where CBS Television Stations and Weigel Broadcasting each own television stations, the network was carried on CBS O&O WBBM-TV, instead of one of Weigel's three stations in that market, WCIU-TV, WWME-CD and WMEU-CD. (A similar situation existed in that market with Movies!, in which WFLD, owned by Weigel's partner in that network, Fox Television Stations, carries the network in lieu of any of Weigel's outlets.) Conversely, Weigel-owned WBME-CD carries the network in the Milwaukee market. WMYS-LD in South Bend, Indiana, was the other Weigel-owned station to carry the network.

On January 9, 2015, Decades reached its first affiliation agreement with a station outside the core CBS Television Stations, through a deal with Media General for its ABC affiliate in Green Bay, Wisconsin, affiliate WBAY-TV (which was previously affiliated with CBS from 1953 to 1992). WBAY planned to carry the marathon blocks on its third subchannel as a replacement for the Live Well Network. However, on January 13, as a result of Walt Disney Television's decision to temporarily continue Live Well Network's national operations, WBAY announced that its 2.3 subchannel would not switch to Decades until after LWN's planned March 2015 shutdown date. It eventually started carrying Ion Television as part of a group deal with WBAY owner Media General to carry the network in markets without an Ion station. When the E.W. Scripps Co. purchased the Ion Television network in 2020, Ion moved to a newly-assigned digital subchannel, 26.5, on competitor WGBA-TV. A few days later, WBAY-TV started airing Decades on channel 2.6.

On September 3, 2018, Decades was replaced on CBS-owned stations with Start TV, a new Weigel-owned diginet focusing on crime dramas with female leads. Weigel maintained its commitment to Decades, with the company's owned-and-operated stations taking over in Los Angeles and Chicago. When it began airing on Fox-owned television stations, Decades moved to KTTV in Los Angeles. In Chicago, Decades continued to be seen on Weigel-owned WMEU-CD and WCIU-TV.

On April 19, 2022, Decades began airing on the Frndly TV live streaming service.

On June 26, 2025, Fubo announced a multi-year agreement with Weigel Broadcasting for distribution of several networks including Catchy Comedy.

Current affiliates for Catchy Comedy
Media market	State/District	Station	Channel
Huntsville	Alabama	WAAY-TV	31.7
Troy–Montgomery	Alabama	WIYC	48.2
Tuscaloosa–Birmingham	Alabama	WSES	33.2
Anchorage	Alaska	KDMD	33.9
Phoenix	Arizona	KUTP	45.4
Fort Smith	Arkansas	KFLU-LD	20.3
Little Rock	Arkansas	KKME-LD	3.1
Fresno	California	KKDJ-CD	8.2
Los Angeles	California	KPOM-CD	14.1
Los Angeles	California	KTTV	11.4
San Francisco–San Jose–Oakland	California	KAXT-CD	1.2
San Francisco–San Jose–Oakland	California	KICU-TV	36.4
Stockton–Sacramento–Modesto	California	KOVR	13.5
Denver	Colorado	KCNC-TV	4.5
Glenwood Springs	Colorado	KREG-TV	3.4
Hartford–New Haven	Connecticut	WHCT-LD	35.5
Washington	District of Columbia	WDME-CD	48.3
Gainesville	Florida	WKMG-LD	6.5
Gainesville	Florida	WOGX	51.4
Jacksonville	Florida	WJAX-TV	47.3
Live Oak–Tallahassee	Florida	WFXU	57.3
Miami–Fort Lauderdale	Florida	WFOR-TV	4.5
Orlando	Florida	WKMG-TV	6.5
Panama City	Florida	WPFN-CD	22.4
St. Petersburg–Tampa	Florida	WTOG	44.5
West Palm Beach	Florida	WBWP-LD	19.3
West Palm Beach	Florida	WTVX	34.2
Atlanta	Georgia	WAGA-TV	5.5
Atlanta	Georgia	WGTA	32.3
Hinesville–Savannah	Georgia	WGCB-LD	35.11
Perry–Macon	Georgia	WPGA-TV	58.7
Boise	Idaho	KRID-LD	22.4
Pocatello–Idaho Falls	Idaho	KPVI-DT	6.2
Twin Falls	Idaho	KBAX-LD	27.4
Chicago	Illinois	WCIU-TV	26.6
Chicago	Illinois	WMEU-CD	48.3
Evansville	Indiana	WZDS-LD	5.4
Indianapolis	Indiana	WBXI-CD	47.2
South Bend	Indiana	WMYS-LD	69.3
Des Moines	Iowa	KDIT-CD	45.1
Mason City	Iowa	KIMT	3.6
Wichita	Kansas	KSCW-DT	33.2
Lexington	Kentucky	WTVQ-DT	36.8
Louisville	Kentucky	WBNM-LD	50.5
Baton Rouge	Louisiana	KPBN-LD	14.3
New Orleans	Louisiana	KNOV-CD	41.4
Bangor	Maine	WABI-TV	5.3
Baltimore	Maryland	WJZ-TV	13.5
Boston	Massachusetts	WBZ-TV	4.5
Detroit	Michigan	WJBK	2.5
Flint–Saginaw	Michigan	WJRT-TV	12.3
Kalamazoo–Battle Creek–Grand Rapids	Michigan	WLLA	64.4
Lansing	Michigan	WLNM-LD	29.6
Minneapolis–Saint Paul	Minnesota	KMSP-TV	9.6
Vicksburg–Jackson	Mississippi	WLOO	35.4
St. Louis	Missouri	KNLC	24.5
Ely	Nevada	KKEL	27.2
Las Vegas	Nevada	KHSV	21.5
Manhattan–Tonopah	Nevada	KBWT	9.2
Albuquerque–Santa Fe	New Mexico	KOB	4.4
Carlsbad	New Mexico	KKAC	19.2
Farmington	New Mexico	KOBF	12.4
Roswell	New Mexico	KOBR	8.4
Silver City	New Mexico	KKAD	10.2
Albany	New York	WNYA	51.3
Buffalo	New York	WBBZ-TV	67.7
New York City	New York	WNYW	5.5
Olean	New York	WVTT-CD	25.2
Rochester	New York	WBGT-CD	46.5
Saranac Lake–Plattsburgh	New York	WYCI	40.3
Syracuse	New York	WTVU-CD	22.5
Utica	New York	WWDG-LD	12.5
Cincinnati	Ohio	WBQC-LD	25.6
Cleveland	Ohio	WOCV-CD	35.1
Columbus	Ohio	WCBZ-CD	22.5
Oklahoma City	Oklahoma	KUOK	36.4
Tulsa	Oklahoma	KUTU-CD	25.5
Johnstown–Altoona	Pennsylvania	WTOO-CD	50.3
Philadelphia	Pennsylvania	WDPN-TV	2.6
Pittsburgh	Pennsylvania	KDKA-TV	2.5
Scranton–Kingston	Pennsylvania	WRLD-LD	30.4
Charleston	South Carolina	WGWG	4.2
Columbia	South Carolina	WZRB	47.5
Greenville–Spartanburg	South Carolina	WDKT-LD	31.6
Lead	South Dakota	KQME	5.4
Rapid City	South Dakota	KHME	23.4
Bristol–Johnson City–Kingsport	Tennessee	WLFG	68.10
Jackson	Tennessee	WYJJ-LD	27.6
Knoxville	Tennessee	WEZK-LD	28.8
Nashville	Tennessee	WJFB	44.4
Memphis	Tennessee	WNBA-LD	2.2
Austin	Texas	KTBC	7.5
Corpus Christi	Texas	KQSY-LD	30.1
Dallas–Fort Worth	Texas	KAZD	55.6
Houston	Texas	KRIV	26.2
Odessa–Midland	Texas	KWWT	30.3
San Antonio	Texas	KCWX	2.4
St. George	Utah	KCSG	8.2
Chesapeake–Norfolk–Virginia Beach	Virginia	WSKY-TV	4.5
Lynchburg–Roanoke	Virginia	WZBJ-CD	24.3
Bellingham	Washington	KVOS-TV	12.4
Seattle–Tacoma	Washington	KFFV	44.4
Charleston–Huntington	West Virginia	WVAH-TV	11.1
Crandon	Wisconsin	WMOW	4.3
Eau Claire	Wisconsin	WQOW	18.2
La Crosse	Wisconsin	WXOW	19.2
Madison	Wisconsin	WKOW	27.2
Milwaukee	Wisconsin	WMLW-TV	49.4
Shawano–Green Bay–Fox Cities	Wisconsin	WMEI	31.7
Wausau	Wisconsin	WAOW	9.3
