= KTTC =

Television station in Rochester, Minnesota

- Rochester–Austin–Albert Lea, Minnesota; Mason City, Iowa; United States
- City: Rochester, Minnesota
- Channels: Digital: 10 (VHF); Virtual: 10
- Branding: KTTC; Rochester CW (10.2)

Programming
- Affiliations: 10.1: NBC; 10.2: CW+; for others, see § Subchannels

Ownership
- Owner: Gray Media; (Gray Television Licensee, LLC)
- Sister stations: KXLT-TV

History
- First air date: July 16, 1953
- Former call signs: KROC-TV (1953–1976)
- Former channel numbers: Analog: 10 (VHF, 1953–2009); Digital: 36 (UHF, 2000–2009)
- Former affiliations: All secondary: CBS (July−August 1953); ABC (July 1953–1954); DuMont (July 1953–1955)
- Call sign meaning: Tri-State Television Coverage

Technical information
- Licensing authority: FCC
- Facility ID: 35678
- ERP: 43.1 kW
- HAAT: 381 m (1,250 ft)
- Transmitter coordinates: 43°34′15″N 92°25′38″W
- Translator(s): K29OE-D (UHF, Rochester); K30RA-D (UHF, Racine))

Links
- Public license information: Public file; LMS
- Website: kttc.com

KTTC (channel 10) is a television station licensed to Rochester, Minnesota, United States, serving Southeast Minnesota and Northern Iowa as an affiliate of NBC and The CW Plus. It is owned by Gray Media alongside Fox affiliate KXLT-TV (channel 47). The two stations share studios in Rochester on Bandel Road Northwest along US 52, and also maintain an advertising sales office on Lakeview Drive in Clear Lake, Iowa, that serves Mason City. KTTC's transmitter is located south of Ostrander, Minnesota, near the Fillmore–Mower county line.

== History ==
The station launched on July 16, 1953, under the call sign KROC-TV, making it the first station in Southern Minnesota and third in the state after KSTP-TV and WTCN-TV in the Twin Cities. It was owned by the Gentling family and their Southern Minnesota Broadcasting Company, and was a sister to KROC radio (1340 AM). The station's original studios and transmitter were located on Hennessey Hill, two miles (3.2 km) west of Rochester. The station carried programming from all four commercial networks of the 1950s: ABC, CBS, and DuMont but was a primary NBC affiliate. The station was launched by G. David Gentling, son of family patriarch Gregory P. Gentling. In November 1966, the station moved to a new building on First Avenue Southwest in Downtown Rochester.

In 1976, due to Federal Communications Commission (FCC) restrictions on ownership of multiple stations in a single market, the station was purchased by Quincy Newspapers from Southern Minnesota Broadcasting. The Gentlings would hold onto KROC AM and KROC-FM 106.9 until 2003. In accordance with an FCC regulation in place then that prohibited TV and radio stations in the same market, but with different ownership groups from sharing the same callsign, channel 10's callsign became KTTC on July 1. KTTC-DT began broadcasting on UHF channel 36 in September 2000. The station has been digital-only since February 17, 2009. The station's pre-transition digital facility on channel 36 became the final post-transition facility for ABC affiliate KAAL.

In 2001, Quincy bought Shockley Communications (then owner of KXLT). However, Quincy could not buy KXLT due to FCC rules governing duopolies. The FCC does not allow two of the four highest-rated stations to be owned by one company. Additionally, Rochester–Austin–Mason City has only six full-power stations, not enough to legally permit a duopoly in any case. Nevertheless, Quincy took over KXLT's operations under a shared services agreement. In 2002, KTTC relocated from its longtime studios on First Avenue Southwest in Downtown Rochester to its current location on Bandel Road in North Rochester, the then-current offices for KXLT. Shockley would later sell the Fox station to SagamoreHill Broadcasting in 2005 which continued the operational agreement with Quincy.

In November 2011, the former KTTC studio on First Avenue SW was demolished to clear the way for the University of Minnesota Rochester's future campus. The City of Rochester sold that property and the Fourth Street Boxing Gym and a small halal market were included in the deal. They were also demolished.

On February 1, 2021, Gray Television announced it had purchased Quincy Media for $925 million. KTTC would gain additional sister stations in nearby markets, including CBS/Fox affiliate KEYC-TV in Mankato, ABC affiliate KCRG-TV in Cedar Rapids and fellow NBC affiliates KWQC-TV in Davenport and WEAU in Eau Claire, while separating itself from KWWL, WXOW and WQOW which would have to be divested to complete the purchase. The acquisition was completed on August 2, 2021.

== News operation ==
In addition to its main studios, KTTC operates an Austin bureau, within the Riverland Community College campus, on 8th Avenue Northwest.

As of September 2022, KTTC presently broadcasts 28 hours of locally produced newscasts each week (with five hours each weekday, 3 hours on Saturdays and 2 hours on Sundays).

Through a news share agreement in place since 2001, KTTC produces a half-hour prime time newscast on KXLT seen Sunday through Thursday nights. Known as Fox 47 News at Nine, the program originates from a secondary set at the Bandel Road Northwest studios. It features a unique graphics package and news music theme that is different from KTTC. KXLT uses most of this NBC outlet's on-air personnel but maintains separate news anchors who can report for KTTC. At some point in 2009, KIMT added the market's second prime time local news show at 9 to its MyNetworkTV-affiliated second digital subchannel. This newscast could be seen for a half hour competing with KXLT's broadcast. Eventually, the effort would be reduced to a five-minute weather cut-in featuring an updated forecast.

On June 12, 2009, KIMT became the market's first television station to upgrade local newscast production to 16:9 enhanced definition widescreen (with some portions in full high definition). Although not truly HD, the aspect ratio matched that of high definition television screens. Video reports from the field were still seen in pillarboxed 4:3 standard definition. It would not be until March 20, 2011, when KTTC performed an upgrade to full high definition newscasts. With the launch to HD came a brand new set and high definition graphics.

On July 28, 2014, KXLT debuted a weekday morning show known as Fox in the Morning (that is produced by KTTC). Airing for 30 minutes at 8 a.m., the program was formatted like a magazine with lifestyle, cooking, and style segments although there are local weather updates featured in the show. Eventually, this broadcast may be extended into the 7 a.m. hour to offer a true local alternative to the national morning programs seen on the big three affiliates. Like the prime time news at 9, the morning program on KXLT maintains separate anchors from KTTC (except for weather segments) and its own graphics scheme.

== Technical information ==
=== Subchannels ===
The station's signal is multiplexed:

Subchannels of KTTC
Channel	Res.	Short name	Programming
10.1	1080i	KTTCNBC	NBC
10.2	720p	KTTCCW	The CW Plus
10.3	480i	MeTV	MeTV
10.4	480i	Grit	Grit
10.5	480i	Crime	True Crime Network
10.6	480i	Outlaw	Outlaw
10.7	480i	MeToons	MeTV Toons

KTTC offered Minnesota's first full-power digital signal in 2000.

=== Former translators ===
In the La Crosse area, KTTC's analog translator W67CH channel 67 ceased broadcasting on November 4, 2009. It was replaced with digital translator station W50DR-D which went on-the-air at 2:10 in the afternoon on October 14. W50DR-D was subsequently replaced with W34FC-D in August 2018. The translator carried subchannels 10.1 NBC and 10.3 Heroes & Icons, as the other subchannels were duplicated on then-sister station and La Crosse affiliate WXOW 19. Until the launch of the La Crosse digital replacement translator (DRT) of WEAU Eau Claire in the summer of 2020, KTTC's La Crosse translator was the only way many area residents could receive NBC over-the-air (due to the area's topography). For nearly a year, W34FC-D and WEAU-DRT La Crosse operated simultaneously, offering area viewers two NBC affiliates. This came to an end on August 2, 2021, when W34FC-D was converted to a translator of WECX-LD, itself repeating WEAU.

KTTC's other two analog translators, in Winona (K62EV channel 62) and Blue Earth (K70DR channel 70), both left the air on December 29, 2011, due to the end of broadcasting on channels above 51 (K70DR in particular was one of the few remaining stations still operating on channel 70, which was phased out starting in 1983).
