= KIMT =

Television station in Mason City, Iowa

- Mason City, Iowa; Albert Lea–Rochester–Austin, Minnesota; United States
- City: Mason City, Iowa
- Channels: Digital: 24 (UHF); Virtual: 3
- Branding: KIMT 3; KIMT News 3; my3.2 (3.2)

Programming
- Affiliations: 3.1: CBS; 3.2: Independent with MyNetworkTV; for others, see § Subchannels

Ownership
- Owner: Allen Media Group; (Rochester TV License Company, LLC)

History
- First air date: May 15, 1954
- Former call signs: KGLO-TV (1954−1977)
- Former channel numbers: Analog: 3 (VHF, 1954–2009); Digital: 42 (UHF, 2002–2019)
- Former affiliations: Both secondary: DuMont (1954–1956); UPN (1995−2006)
- Call sign meaning: "Iowa Minnesota Television"

Technical information
- Licensing authority: FCC
- Facility ID: 66402
- ERP: 472 kW
- HAAT: 465.7 m (1,528 ft)
- Transmitter coordinates: 43°28′32″N 92°42′30″W

Links
- Public license information: Public file; LMS
- Website: www.kimt.com

KIMT (channel 3) is a television station licensed to Mason City, Iowa, United States, serving North Central Iowa and Southeast Minnesota as an affiliate of CBS and MyNetworkTV. Owned by Allen Media Group, the station maintains studios on North Pennsylvania Avenue in downtown Mason City, with a news bureau on Highway 52 North in Rochester, Minnesota, and a sales office on East William Street in downtown Albert Lea, Minnesota. Its transmitter is located near Meyer, Iowa (between Stacyville and McIntire) south of the Minnesota state line.

== History ==
The station signed on for the first time on May 15, 1954, as KGLO-TV, owned by Lee Enterprises along with the Globe Gazette and KGLO radio (1300 AM and 101.1 FM). On the station's first day, reception of its analog signal on VHF channel 3 was reported as far away as Gary, Indiana. The original effective radiated power of 100,000 watts was the maximum amount permitted on the heritage allotment. It was affiliated with CBS owing to its radio sister's long affiliation with CBS Radio, but also carried a secondary relation with DuMont until 1956, when that network ceased operations.

In August 1977, the Federal Communications Commission (FCC) ruled that one company could not own all the media outlets in a city, forcing Lee Enterprises to break up its cluster in Mason City. As a result, KGLO radio was sold to BY Communications in 1977 and the television station was renamed KIMT (standing for "Iowa Minnesota Television") on August 1. In 1980, it was sold to the Shott family of Bluefield, West Virginia, and their Daily Telegraph Printing Company. However, in 1984, they sold KIMT and WBTW in Florence, South Carolina, to Spartan Radiocasting Company (later to become Spartan Communications).

Early in the morning on June 27, 1995, KIMT news anchor Jodi Huisentruit was abducted outside her apartment while on her way to work. She has not been found and the case remains unsolved to this day.

Spartan merged with Media General in 2000. KIMT's digital signal on UHF channel 42 launched in May 2002 and added high definition capabilities from the network during that summer. KIMT celebrated its 50th anniversary on May 15, 2004, with flashbacks and other special programming. On October 18, 2018, KIMT moved to channel 24 as part of the FCC repack.

On April 6, 2006, Media General announced it would sell KIMT as part of the company's acquisition of four NBC owned-and-operated stations. On August 2, New Vision Television made public it had bought KIMT and sister station WIAT in Birmingham, Alabama, for $35 million. That company's acquisition of the two outlets was finalized on October 12, 2006. As part of the analog to digital transition in 2009, the station opted to keep its analog channel on-air until the revised June 12 deadline. After the transition (which occurred at 12:12 p.m.), KIMT planned to continue using digital channel 42 and filed paperwork with the FCC to eventually increase that signal's output power from 200 to 800 kW which would more effectively fill its coverage footprint.

On May 7, 2012, LIN TV Corporation announced that it would acquire the New Vision Television station group, including KIMT, for $330.4 million and the assumption of $12 million in debt. On October 2, the FCC approved the proposed sale to LIN TV. The transaction was finalized on October 12, 2012.

On March 21, 2014, Media General announced that it would acquire LIN. The merger was completed on December 19, making KIMT a Media General property once again, and marking the third ownership change for the station in less than a decade.

In September 2015, Media General announced the acquisition of Meredith Corporation in a cash and stock deal valued at $2.4 billion. Upon completion of the deal, KIMT, along with Davenport sister station and NBC affiliate KWQC-TV, would have become Meredith's first television stations in its home state of Iowa. However, on January 27, 2016, it was announced that the Nexstar Broadcasting Group would buy Media General for $4.6 billion. KIMT would have become part of "Nexstar Media Group", joining a cluster of Nexstar stations serving Iowa including ABC affiliates WOI-DT in Des Moines and KCAU-TV in Sioux City, and CBS affiliate WHBF-TV in the Quad Cities. On June 13, 2016, Nexstar announced that it would sell KIMT and four other stations to Heartland Media, through its USA Television MidAmerica Holdings joint venture with MSouth Equity Partners, for $115 million; the sale was required to allow Nexstar to comply with FCC ownership caps following the merger. The deal was consummated upon the approval of Nexstar's merger with Media General on January 17, 2017.

On October 1, 2019, Allen Media Broadcasting, a subsidiary of Entertainment Studios, announced that it would acquire KIMT and 10 other Heartland stations for $290 million. The sale was approved by the FCC on November 22, 2019.

On June 1, 2025, amid financial woes and rising debt, Allen Media Group announced that it would explore "strategic options" for the company, such as a sale of its television stations (including KIMT).

=== July 2015 carriage dispute with Mediacom ===
On July 14, 2015, KIMT and its digital subchannels were pulled from the North Iowa region's Mediacom cable systems due to a carriage dispute over retransmission consent fees between Mediacom and KIMT owner Media General. This carriage dispute was part of an ongoing disagreement nationwide between Mediacom and Media General, which saw Media General stations in 14 television markets in the United States pulled from Mediacom cable systems and even three Fox affiliates owned by Media General were lost to Mediacom subscribers in Hampton Roads, Virginia, Terre Haute, Indiana, and Topeka, Kansas just before the start of the 2015 Major League Baseball All-Star Game. On July 30, 2015, Mediacom and Media General reached a new agreement, thereby restoring KIMT and its digital subchannels to North Iowa area Mediacom subscribers.

== News operation ==
Since KIMT is the only major station licensed to the Iowa side of the market, its newscasts have traditionally focused on Iowa issues. On June 12, 2009, KIMT became the first outlet to upgrade newscasts to 16:9 enhanced definition widescreen with some parts in full high definition. Although not truly HD, the aspect ratio matches that of high definition television screens.

Also at some point that year, KIMT added three newscasts to its MyNetworkTV-affiliated subchannel. This included a half-hour extension to its weekday morning show at 7 (known as My Morning News on My 3.2), a repeat of the thirty-minute weekday noon broadcast at 12:30 (called KIMT News 3 Midday on My 3.2), and prime time newscast weeknights at 9 (known as My Primetime News at 9). Eventually, the half-hour weeknight show was reduced to a five-minute cut-in featuring an updated weather forecast.

On March 20, 2011, rival NBC affiliate KTTC (channel 10) in Rochester upgraded its local news to full high definition becoming the first outlet to do so. KIMT has expanded its weekday morning news show, airing 2 1/2 hours of news from 4:30 to 7 a.m. and an additional half hour, My Morning News on My 3.2, starting at 7 a.m. on KIMT-DT2.

On January 17, 2025, Allen Media Group announced plans to cut local meteorologist/weather forecaster positions from its stations, including KIMT, and replacing them with a "weather hub" produced by The Weather Channel, which AMG also owns.

== Subchannels ==
The station's signal is multiplexed:

Subchannels of KIMT
Channel	Res.	Short name	Programming
3.1	1080i	KIMTCBS	CBS
3.2	720p	KIMTMyN	Independent with MyNetworkTV
3.3	480i	KIMTION	Ion
3.4	480i	KIMTANT	Antenna TV (4:3)
3.5	480i	KIMTSTR	Story Television
3.6	480i	KIMTCC	Catchy Comedy
