= Globe Gazette =

Daily newspaper published in Mason City, Iowa, U.S.

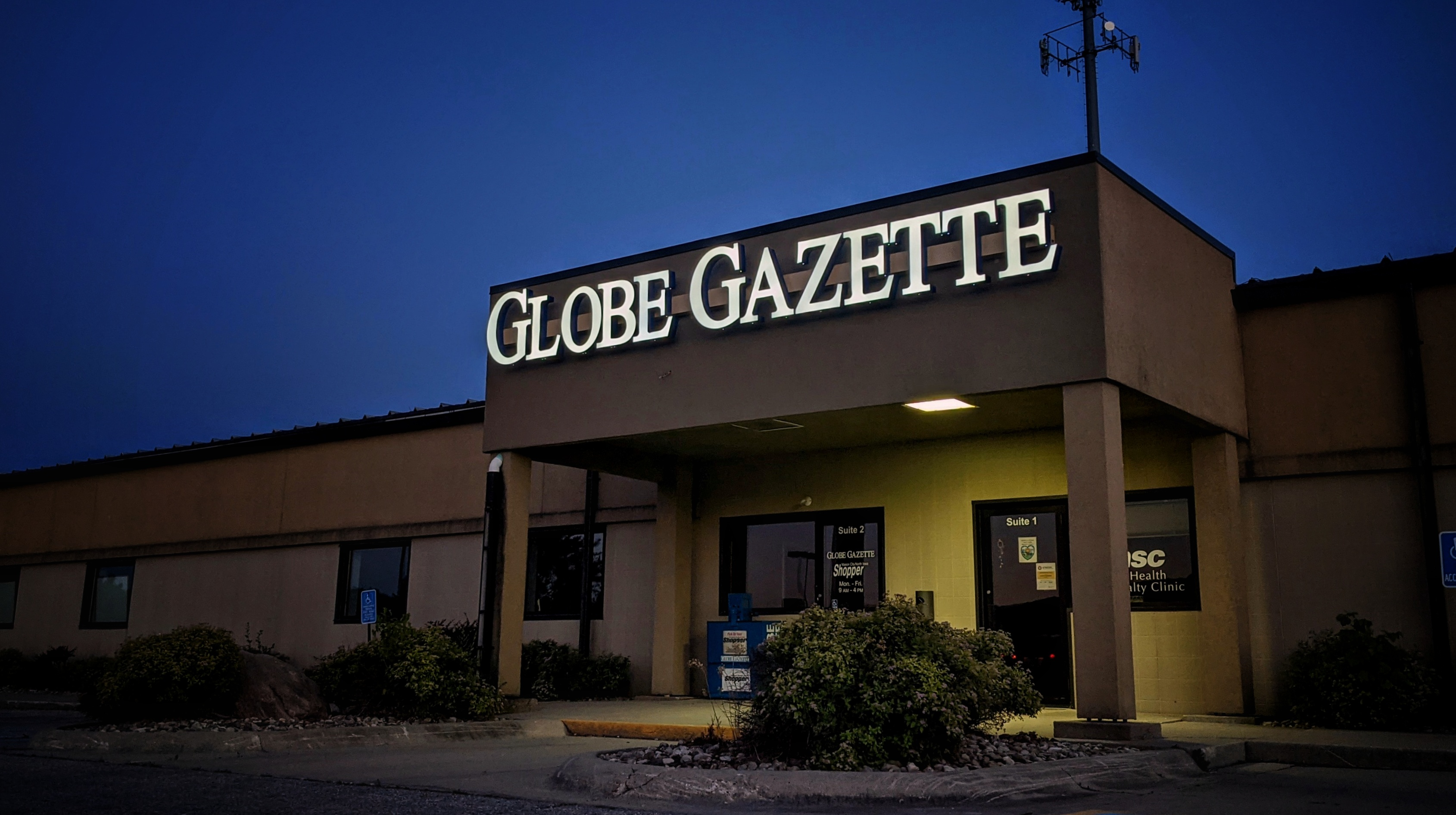
- Globe Gazette building
- Type: Daily newspaper
- Format: Broadsheet
- Owner: Lee Enterprises
- Editor: Doug Hines
- Founded: July 17, 1858; 167 years ago
- Headquarters: 687 South Taft Avenue; Mason City, Iowa 50402
- Country: United States
- Circulation: 6,382 Daily (as of 2023)
- ISSN: 8750-9970
- OCLC number: 12027093
- Website: globegazette.com

Logo in 2014

The Globe Gazette, known locally as the Globe, is a daily morning newspaper published in Mason City, Iowa, in the United States.

== History ==
The Globe Gazette traces its history back to July 17, 1858, and a weekly newspaper called The Cerro Gordo Press, named for Cerro Gordo County. By the time Lee Enterprises in 1925, under its current name, it had been known as the Republican, the Express, the Express-Republican, the Freeman, the Western Democrat, the Herald, the Times-Herald, the Gazette, and the Globe. The newspaper published in the afternoon, Monday through Saturday, until 1977, when the Saturday edition switched to morning publication. In 1981, all publication switched to a morning schedule. Sunday Globes began publication in 1985.

Starting June 20, 2023, the print edition of the newspaper will be reduced to three days a week: Tuesday, Thursday and Saturday. Also, the newspaper will transition from being delivered by a traditional newspaper delivery carrier to mail delivery by the U.S. Postal Service.

== Content ==
Reporting focuses on local news across a nine-county coverage area and high school sports in 16 school districts. Opinions and editorials published by the newspaper represent a major forum for debate on local issues. The Globe Gazette entered the Internet news arena much earlier than most small newspapers and continues to offer continuously updated content on its website, official Facebook (@mcglobegazette) and Twitter (@globegazette) pages, and its mobile app. The Globe publishes a printed newspaper and e-Edition Tuesday through Sunday. A national-wire e-Edition is published online for subscribers on Mondays.
