= Chippewa Valley =

Valley in Wisconsin, USA

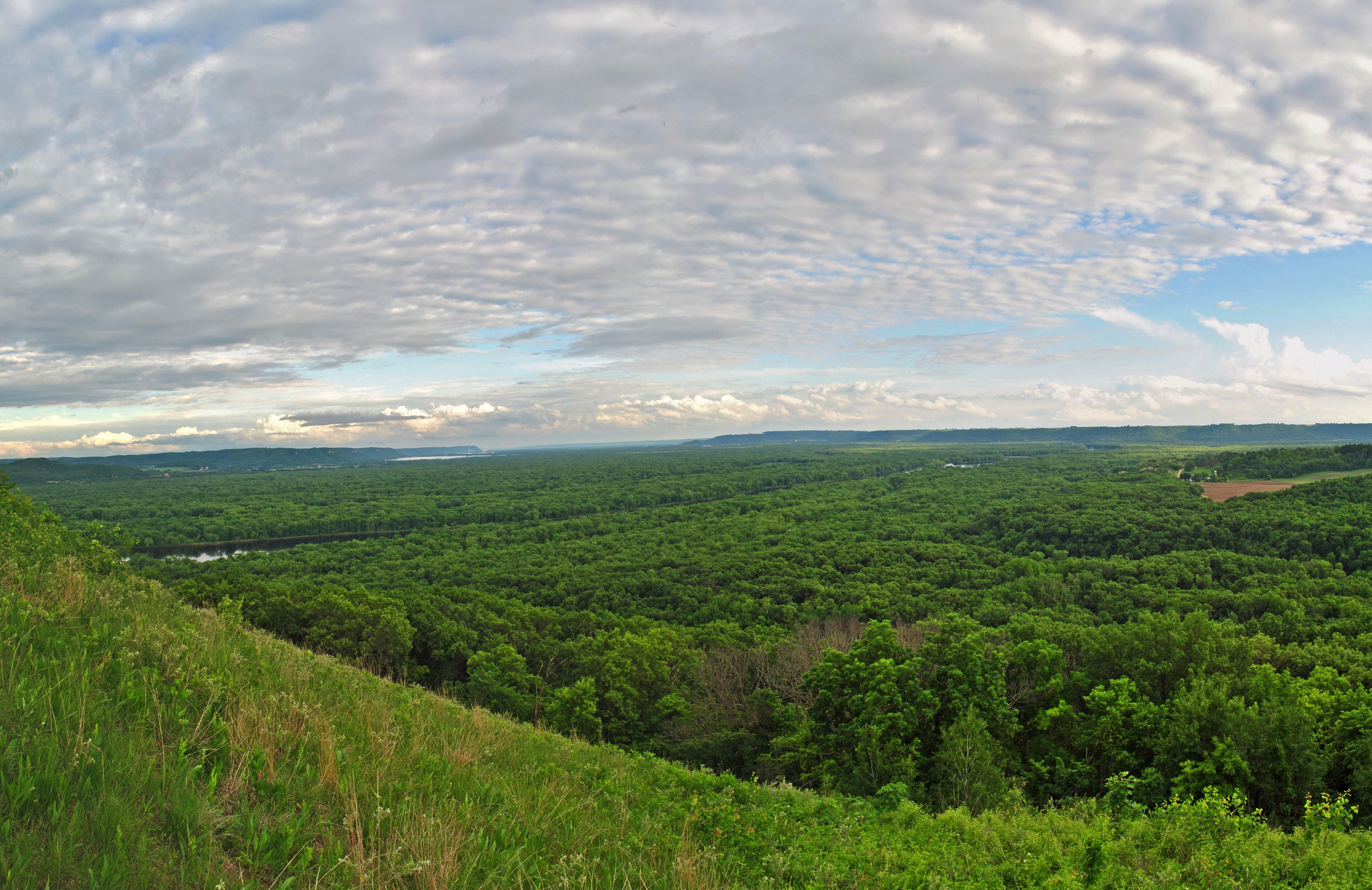
- Lower Chippewa River Valley, Five-Mile Bluff Prairie State Natural Area

- Location within Wisconsin

Geography
- Coordinates: 44°45′N 91°30′W
- Interactive map of Chippewa Valley

The Chippewa Valley is a valley in Wisconsin, US.

== History ==
The valley was first inhabited by the Ojibwe and colonized by German and Scandinavian immigrants. The region also has a large Hmong community. While the term "Chippewa Valley" technically refers to the drainage basin of the Chippewa River and its tributaries, the name is more often applied to the Eau Claire-Chippewa Falls metropolitan area and the surrounding area—including communities not located within the Chippewa River's watershed.

From the 1850s to the early 1910s, lumber baron Orrin Henry Ingram was largely responsible for the deforestation of the valley and the subsequent establishment of many small towns in the area.

The population center of the Chippewa Valley is Eau Claire. Menards, an American home improvement retail company, is also headquartered there. They are also a major job provider due to their manufacturing sites located in the area. Other communities include Menomonie, Chippewa Falls, Durand, and Altoona. The region's agricultural products include milk, cheese, horseradish, kidney beans, apples, pumpkins, beef, and poultry. Much of the regional economy is service-driven, although there is also a significant light-industrial segment, especially in high tech (mainly computers).

Historic sites include the Cook-Rutledge Mansion in Chippewa Falls, the Caddie Woodlawn Museum south of Downsville, the Mabel Tainter Center for the Arts in Menomonie, and a number of exhibits in Eau Claire's Carson Park. In addition, there are a number of sites listed by the National Register of Historic Places in the area.
