= WKOW =

Television station in Madison, Wisconsin

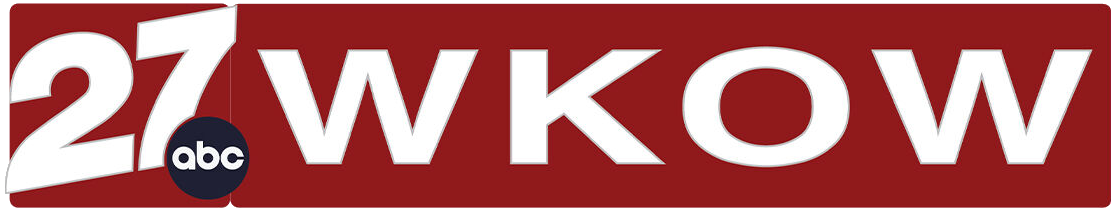
- Madison, Wisconsin; United States
- Channels: Digital: 26 (UHF); Virtual: 27
- Branding: WKOW 27 (call letters are pronounced individually); 27 News

Programming
- Affiliations: 27.1: ABC; for others, see § Subchannels

Ownership
- Owner: Allen Media Broadcasting; (Madison TV License Company, LLC)

History
- First air date: June 30, 1953
- Former call signs: WKOW-TV (1953–2009)
- Former channel numbers: Analog: 27 (UHF, 1953–2009)
- Former affiliations: CBS (1953–1956)
- Call sign meaning: "cow" (for Wisconsin's dairy industry)

Technical information
- Licensing authority: FCC
- Facility ID: 64545
- ERP: 800 kW
- HAAT: 455 m (1,493 ft)
- Transmitter coordinates: 43°3′21″N 89°32′6″W

Links
- Public license information: Public file; LMS
- Website: wkow.com

WKOW (channel 27) is a television station in Madison, Wisconsin, United States, affiliated with ABC and owned by Allen Media Group. The station's studios are located on Tokay Boulevard on Madison's west side, and its transmitter is located on South Pleasant View Road in the city's Junction Ridge neighborhood.

WKOW serves as the master hub for Allen Media Group's five-station network of ABC affiliates throughout western and northern Wisconsin.

== History ==
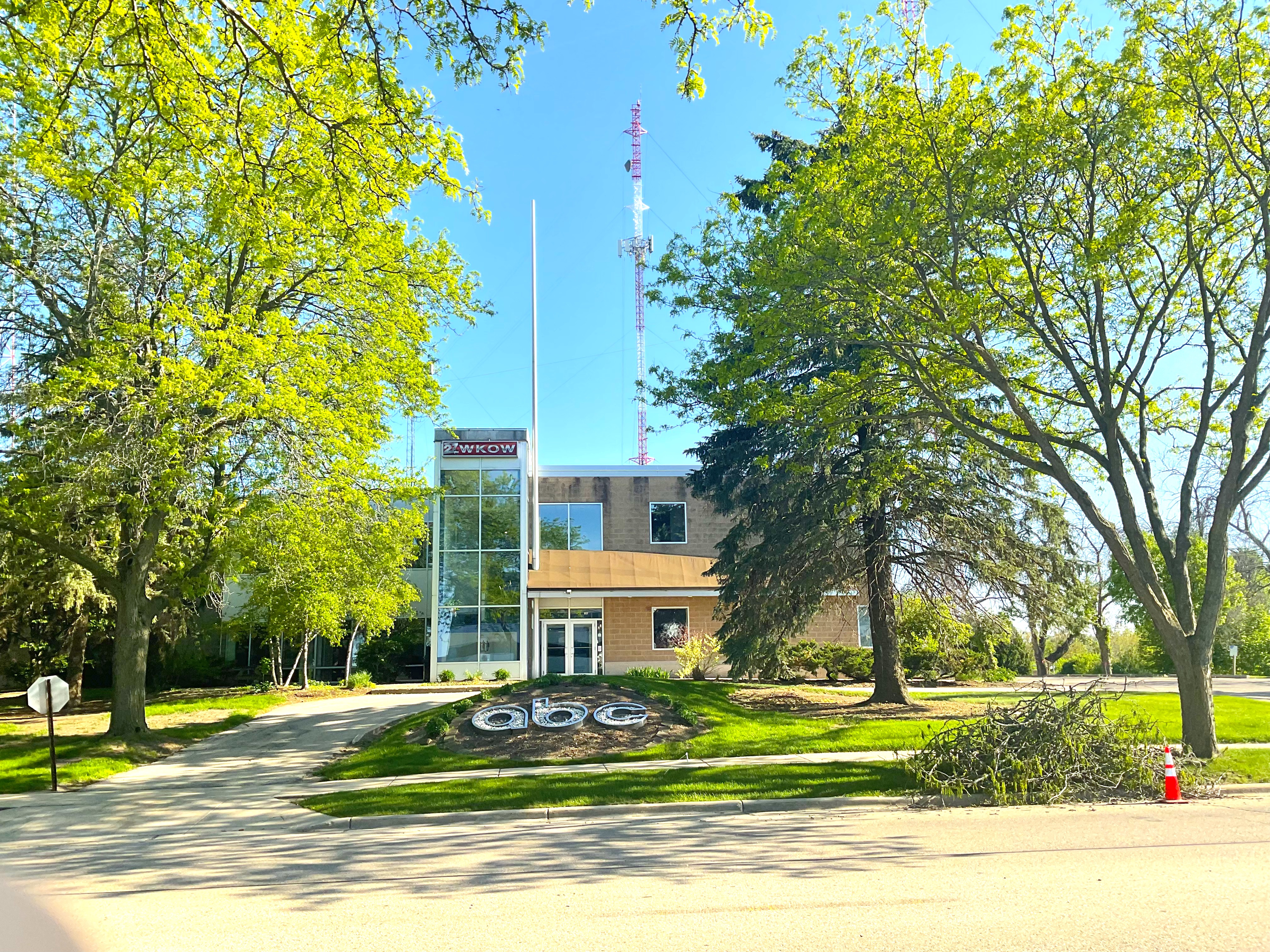
WKOW's studios and transmitter on Madison's southwest side.

WKOW-TV (the suffix was dropped from the call sign in 2009) was launched on June 30, 1953, as Madison's first television station. The station was originally aligned with CBS and owned by the Monona Broadcasting Company, led by a group of local area businessmen along with WKOW radio (AM 1070). The WKOW call sign was an acknowledgment to Wisconsin's dairy industry, and featured a smiling bovine (or cow) alongside the emphasized "K-O-W" of the call sign. WKOW-AM-TV shared studios on Tokay Boulevard on Madison's west side beginning in 1953.

WKOW-TV remained with CBS until 1956, when CBS moved to the new WISC-TV. WKOW-TV subsequently joined ABC (who had been affiliated with WMTV on a secondary basis), while WKOW radio remained with CBS Radio. From January to August 1958, WKOW was part of the short-lived, Wisconsin-oriented Badger Television Network, alongside Milwaukee's WISN-TV and Green Bay's WFRV-TV. In 1960, Monona Broadcasting sold the station to Midcontinent Broadcasting. The station began to broadcast color programs on December 24, 1963. Midcontinent Broadcasting sold both WKOW-TV and WAOW in Wausau to Horizon Communications in September 1970; in accordance with the Federal Communications Commission (FCC)'s "one to market" policy of that era, Midcontinent retained WKOW radio. Despite the separate ownership, the renamed WTSO would remain at Tokay Boulevard alongside WKOW-TV through the 1980s and 1990s until becoming part of Clear Channel/iHeart and being clustered with other stations such as former competitor WIBA. WKOW continued to maintain a weather partnership with WTSO and its sister stations until the fall of 2010.

In 1974, Terry Shockley became manager of WKOW and its fellow sister stations that were part of the Wisconsin Television Network (which included WAOW in Wausau and WXOW in La Crosse). Horizon sold its stations to Liberty Television in 1978. In January 1985, Liberty Television sold WKOW and its Wausau and La Crosse sister stations to Tak Communications, which would later purchase KITV in Honolulu, Hawaii, and WGRZ-TV in Buffalo, New York. In October 1990, Tak Communications' lenders sued the company to force the appointment of a receiver; after reaching an agreement with its lenders, Tak filed for Chapter 11 bankruptcy January 1991. Tak's creditors sought to take control of the company in December 1992, but the FCC did not approve the transfer due to objections that were filed by the group's stations in Wisconsin. After Tak's assets were seized by its creditors in 1994, Shockley would purchase the four Wisconsin stations in 1995 (WKOW, WAOW, WXOW, and Eau Claire's WQOW) for his newly formed company, Shockley Communications. In June 2001, WKOW and its Wisconsin sister stations were acquired by Quincy Newspapers from Shockley.

On January 7, 2021, Quincy Media announced that it had put itself up for sale. On February 1, Gray Television announced it would purchase Quincy's radio and TV properties for $925 million. As Gray already owns WMTV in the Madison market, and both that station and WKOW rank among the market's top four stations, it agreed that WKOW would be divested in order to satisfy FCC requirements. On April 29, Gray announced that WKOW would be divested to Allen Media Broadcasting. The $380 million deal includes WAOW, WXOW, WQOW, WREX in neighboring Rockford, Illinois, and other Quincy-owned stations where overlaps with Gray occur. The sale was officially completed on August 2, 2021.

On June 1, 2025, amid financial woes and rising debt, Allen Media Group announced that it would explore "strategic options" for the company, such as a sale of its television stations (including WKOW).

== Digital television ==
Logo for WKOW's MeTV affiliation (c. 2011-2021)

WKOW has been a pioneer of sorts in the world of digital terrestrial television. When the station launched high-definition broadcasts on October 29, 1998 (on digital channel 26), it became at the time the smallest United States television station to launch digital HD broadcasts. WKOW is still regularly used for digital television experiments, including an October 2014 test involving one of the competitors for the ATSC 3.0 standard in 4K resolution, backed by LG and Zenith.

In the late 2000s, WKOW would launch two digital subchannels alongside primary channel 27.1. Subchannel 27.2 was originally affiliated with the Retro Television Network, which was replaced on July 1, 2011, by the similarly-formatted MeTV. Subchannel 27.3 launched in March 2009 with the movie network This TV, which was replaced on September 2, 2015, at 12 noon by MeTV's sister network, Decades.

A caveat in Gray Television's purchase of Quincy Media's stations in 2021 involved WKOW's subchannels: In requiring that Gray spinoff WKOW and other stations to Allen Media Broadcasting, the U.S. Department of Justice deemed as an "excluded asset" the MeTV affiliation that WKOW had carried, meaning that Gray taking over the MeTV affiliation in Madison — as well as MeTV and The CW affiliations in Eau Claire, La Crosse, Wausau — would not adversely affect Allen Media's operations as "viable, independent competitors" in those markets. As a result on August 2, 2021, when Gray's purchase of Quincy Media and Allen Media's purchase of WKOW became final, the MeTV affiliation moved to a subchannel of Gray-owned WMTV.

To fill the void left by MeTV's departure, Decades would be temporarily simulcast on subchannels 27.2 and 27.3 for two weeks until August 19, 2021, when This TV returned to 27.3; the move reunited WKOW with This TV, which Allen Media purchased in late 2020.

== Programming ==
=== Sports programming ===
WKOW serves as the originating station for broadcasts of Wisconsin Interscholastic Athletic Association (WIAA) championship events. WKOW, its Allen Media-owned sister stations in Central and Western Wisconsin, and affiliates in the Milwaukee and Green Bay markets air WIAA boys' and girls' hockey and basketball state championships each March. (The hockey and boys' basketball tournaments are staged in Madison, the girls' basketball tournament in Green Bay.) WKOW is also an affiliate of the Green Bay Packers television network along with its AMG sisters, carrying the team's preseason games and in-season programming. By coincidence as part of AMG's investment in Diamond Sports Group, WKOW is now a half-sister operation of Bally Sports Wisconsin. In 2023, WKOW and its sisters and other affiliates began to also carry the WIAA football championships at Camp Randall Stadium, returning the games to the station for the first time since the mid 1990s.

Subchannel 27.2 has cleared any ABC programming that may be preempted on 27.1 for local sports and breaking news coverage (e.g. coverage of the WIAA state hockey and basketball tournaments carried each March on 27.1).

Until the 2023 (when the rights to Big Ten Conference sports departed ABC and ESPN), WKOW carried Wisconsin Badgers sports originated at the network level.

=== News operation ===
WKOW presently broadcasts 24 1/2 hours of local newscasts each week (with 4 1/2 hours each weekday and two hours each on Saturdays and Sundays).

WKOW debuted a news department on the first day of its broadcasting in summer 1953. Local news, weather, and sports were seen in the initial shows. From 1999 to 2011, the station produced, through a news share agreement, the market's first nightly prime time newscast on Sinclair-owned Fox affiliate WMSN-TV (Fox 47 News at 9); the newscast originated from a secondary studio at WKOW, and although it featured WKOW personnel in the broadcasts, WMSN maintained separate weeknight news and sports anchors, as well as using theme music and graphics packages that are found on other Sinclair stations and that are different from that on WKOW's newscasts. (WISC-TV subchannel TVW had aired a prime-time newscast from 2004 to 2011; a third station, WBUW, had its own 9 p.m. newscast from 2003 until 2005.) WISC-TV took over the production of the WMSN newscast at the beginning of 2012.

On October 26, 2010, WKOW became the third station in Madison to upgrade newscasts to high definition, following WISC-TV and WMTV. The WMSN broadcasts, however, were still in 4:3 standard definition, as the station did not have the necessary equipment to air local or syndicated HD programming.

== Technical information ==
=== Subchannels ===
The station's signal is multiplexed:

Subchannels of WKOW
Subchannel	Res.	Short name	Programming
27.1	720p	WKOWABC	ABC
27.2	720p	CATCHY	Catchy Comedy
27.3	480i	MeTOONS	MeTV Toons
27.4	720p	CourtTV	Court TV
27.5	480i	CRIME	True Crime Network
27.6	480i	WKOW-6	Camera(s)

=== Analog-to-digital conversion ===
WKOW shut down its analog signal, over UHF channel 27, at 1 p.m. on February 17, 2009, the original target date on which full-power television stations in the United States were to transition from analog to digital broadcasts under federal mandate (which was later pushed back to June 12, 2009). The station's digital signal remained on its pre-transition UHF channel 26, using virtual channel 27.
