= KAAL =

Television station in Austin, Minnesota

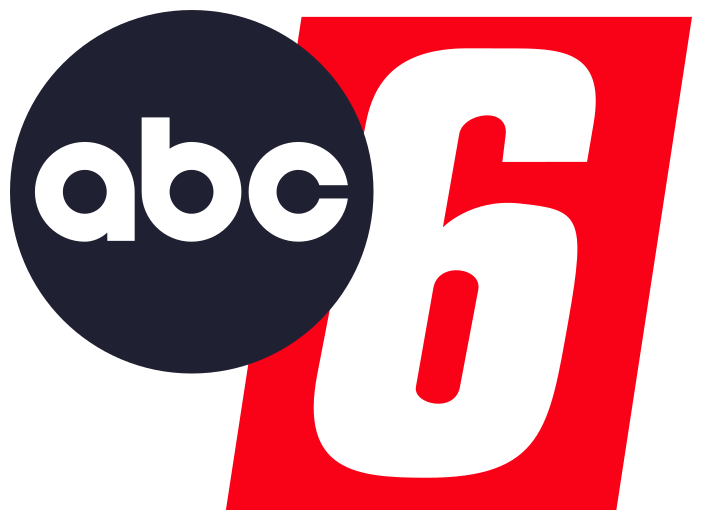
- Austin–Albert Lea–Rochester, Minnesota; Mason City, Iowa; United States
- City: Austin, Minnesota
- Channels: Digital: 36 (UHF); Virtual: 6
- Branding: ABC 6

Programming
- Affiliations: 6.1: ABC; for others, see § Subchannels

Ownership
- Owner: Hubbard Broadcasting; (KAAL-TV, LLC)

History
- First air date: August 17, 1953
- Former call signs: KMMT (1953–1967); KAUS-TV (1967–1974); KAAL-TV (1974–1998)
- Former channel numbers: Analog: 6 (VHF, 1953–2009); Digital: 33 (UHF, 2001–2009)
- Former affiliations: CBS (1953–1954); ABC (secondary, 1953–1954); DuMont (secondary, 1953–1955)
- Call sign meaning: Austin/Albert Lea

Technical information
- Licensing authority: FCC
- Facility ID: 18285
- ERP: 620 kW
- HAAT: 326 m (1,070 ft)
- Transmitter coordinates: 43°38′34″N 92°31′36.0″W
- Translator(s): 33 (UHF) Garner, Iowa

Links
- Public license information: Public file; LMS
- Website: www.kaaltv.com

KAAL (channel 6) is a television station licensed to Austin, Minnesota, United States, serving as the ABC affiliate for Southeast Minnesota and Northern Iowa. The station is owned by Hubbard Broadcasting and maintains studios in the TJ Maxx–anchored shopping center on Salem Road in Rochester, Minnesota. Its primary transmitter is located in Grand Meadow Township, with a digital replacement translator in Garner, Iowa, near Mason City.

Channel 6 went on the air as KMMT on August 17, 1953. It was built by a consortium of Austin radio station KAUS and other investors and operated from the same facility as KAUS radio. The station became a sole ABC affiliate the next year, having originally also carried CBS and DuMont programs. From 1958 to 1980, the station was owned by Black Hawk Broadcasting of Waterloo, Iowa; it was renamed KAUS-TV in 1967, and then KAAL in 1974, when Black Hawk sold off the KAUS radio stations.

After a series of other out-of-state owners in the 1980s and 1990s, including the News-Press & Gazette Company, Dix Broadcasting, and Grapevine Communications, KAAL was acquired by Hubbard Broadcasting in 2001. The purchase completed Hubbard's ownership of every ABC affiliate in the state of Minnesota. To better compete with market leader KTTC in the growing Rochester area, the station expanded its existing Rochester offices in 2008 and then moved its studios to a new facility there in 2015.

== History ==
As the Federal Communications Commission (FCC) neared the end of its multiple-year freeze on TV station awards, Austin radio station KAUS announced in February 1952 that it had filed for a construction permit and acquired an antenna and tower, which were shipped from St. Paul. KAUS's application remained pending when the South Central Minnesota Television Company, associated with stations KATE in Albert Lea and KOBK in Owatonna, filed a competing application for channel 6 in January 1953. Facing the prospect of a lengthy comparative hearing to determine who should be allocated the channel, KAUS and the South Central Minnesota Television Company combined their applications in March 1953, joining as the Minnesota-Iowa Television Company and winning the channel 6 permit. The station took the call sign KMMT, the only proposed call sign that was available of a list submitted by the company to the FCC; the KAUS-TV call sign was not available because of the separate ownership.

From studios south of Austin on MN 105, shared with KAUS radio, KMMT signed on the air on August 17, 1953. The station was originally an affiliate of CBS, ABC, and the DuMont Television Network. It also broadcast local news and sports coverage; one early program, Circle 6 Ranch, featured country music artist Johnny Western singing songs and presenting films. The CBS and DuMont affiliations in the area moved to KGLO-TV in Mason City, Iowa, when that station began in May 1954. The station also briefly affiliated with the NTA Film Network, which began in 1956.

Black Hawk Broadcasting of Waterloo, Iowa, assumed management control of KAUS and KMMT on October 1, 1954; the deal included an option to buy the stations, which Black Hawk exercised in 1957. During this time, the station began airing the long-running Family Hour, a Christian program hosted by pastor Joe Matt; the 15-minute show remained on the air on channel 6 until 2001, ending its run as the longest-running local TV show in the United States. In 1959, KMMT increased its power to the maximum of 100,000 watts; this expanded the station's coverage area as well as that of ABC, which had no nearby affiliates.

Its call letters became KAUS-TV (for Austin) on June 1, 1967, to match its radio sisters; at that time, the station built a new, 1,000-foot (300 m) tower west of Austin for KMMT and to support a new FM station, KAUS-FM 99.9, which launched on May 30, 1968. The old tower was purchased by KTCA-TV and reassembled in the Rushford area for use as part of a translator setup for that station. That same year, KAUS-TV discontinued its translators in La Crosse and Winona after the FCC approved a new La Crosse station, WXOW, which would become an ABC affiliate; KMMT had been transmitting to La Crosse since January 1967. The Winona transmitter was sold to KROC-TV of Rochester, Minnesota, and switched to provide its NBC programming.

Black Hawk Broadcasting sold its Austin radio stations to Withers Broadcasting in 1974. As KAUS-TV and KAUS AM could not share a call sign under separate owners, an exchange was developed. KAUS-TV became KAAL-TV, adopting a call sign which for two years had been used on KAUS-FM. Withers retained the radio studio facility, and KAAL moved the next year to a new site in Austin, a former Volkswagen dealership located on 10th Place NE.

The News-Press & Gazette Company (NPG) of St. Joseph, Missouri, acquired KAAL for $11.25 million in 1980. The sale was a required divestiture to allow Black Hawk Broadcasting to merge into American Family Corporation; to meet FCC ownership regulations, Black Hawk needed to spin off more than half of the seven broadcast properties it owned. During this time, KAAL originated the telecast of the Miss Minnesota pageant, seen statewide. NPG owned the station for five years, selling it for $13.5 million to the Wooster Republican Printing Company of Wooster, Ohio—the Dix family—in 1985. During Dix ownership, KAAL signed a secondary affiliation agreement with Fox. It was also among the first ABC affiliates to agree to carry the NFL on Fox when football left CBS for Fox in 1994.

Eastern Broadcasting acquired KAAL and KTWO-TV in Casper, Wyoming, from the Dix family in 1995; the owner of Eastern, Roger Neuhoff, came out of retirement to run the two stations. In 1997, Eastern sold its four stations—KAAL, KTWO-TV and repeater KKTU, and KODE-TV in Joplin, Missouri—for $40 million to Atlanta-based Grapevine Communications; two years later, Grapevine acquired GOCOM, though the GOCOM name and corporate offices in Charlotte, North Carolina, were retained.

Hubbard Broadcasting agreed to purchase KAAL from GOCOM in October 2000; it was the last ABC affiliate in Minnesota that Hubbard did not already own. The station began digital broadcasting on February 20, 2002; the analog signal was turned off on June 12, 2009.

Under Hubbard, KAAL has invested resources and shifted the bulk of its operation from Austin to Rochester in an effort to increase news ratings against market-leading KTTC and shed its reputation as a station solely focused on the Austin area. In 2008, the station opened a new Rochester office on Superior Drive NW, which included equipment allowing for a newscast to be presented from both cities. In 2015, it moved to a new and larger southwest Rochester facility, which became the main studio.

=== Notable former on-air staff ===
- Butch Stearns – sports director, early 1990s
- Bill Weir – reporter and weekend sports anchor, 1991–1992

== Subchannels ==
KAAL's primary transmitter is located in Grand Meadow Township, with a digital replacement translator in Garner, Iowa, near Mason City. The station's signal is multiplexed:

Subchannels of KAAL
| Subchannel | Res. | Short name | Programming |
|---|---|---|---|
| 6.1 | 720p | KAAL-DT | ABC |
| 6.2 | 480i | StartTV | Start TV |
| 6.3 | 480i | IonPlus | Ion Plus |
| 6.4 | 480i | Bounce | Bounce TV |
| 6.5 | 480i | ION | Ion |
