= National Puzzle Day =

American observance on January 29

- Observed by: United States
- Type: Unofficial
- Significance: Celebrates the playing puzzles
- Date: January 29
- Frequency: Annual

National Puzzle Day is an American observance that occurs annually on January 29. Established by Jodi Jill in 1994, the holiday encourages people to solve and create puzzles of all types.

== Background ==
Jodi Jill, a puzzle enthusiast, started giving away free puzzles, known as "Brain Bafflers", in the magazine Official Freebies for Teachers. Eventually, people started continually asking her for free puzzles, so she decided to only send out free puzzles one day a year, on her birthday, January 29. By 1994 this was observed as National Puzzle Day. Beginning in 2002 the holiday became widely known.

== Recognition ==
One year, 2016, the Michigan Historical Center used puzzles and National Puzzle Day to create awareness of Michigan history. Placing historic images like old maps, photos, and other items from the state archives on jigsaw puzzles to educate.

To celebrate every year, the student union at University of Texas Rio Grande Valley puts on a contest for National Puzzle Day. The contest entries are a completed puzzle and posting it on the student union's social media by noon on Puzzle Day.

In 2023, White Castle released a limited edition 285-piece jigsaw puzzle on National Puzzle Day. The proceeds of puzzle sales went to White Castle's Team Member Relief Fund to help team members facing unexpected hardships.

Some people observe National Puzzle Day by playing various types of puzzles, or going to various puzzle events. During the month of January, some puzzles are given away to educators or offered at reduced price promotions. Some libraries run puzzle swaps as an event on this day and sell puzzles with the donating proceeds of puzzle sales to benefit various organizations or charities.
