= ABC Austin =

ABC Austin may refer to:

- KVUE in Austin, Texas
- KAAL in Austin, Minnesota
