= Alfred Berglund =

Alfred Berglund may refer to:

- Alfred Berglund (admiral) (1862–1945), Norwegian admiral
- Alfred Berglund (politician) (1871–1962), American farmer and politician
