= KAUS-FM =

Radio station in Austin, Minnesota

- Austin, Minnesota; United States
- Broadcast area: Austin–Albert Lea; Rochester, Minnesota; Mason City, Iowa
- Frequency: 99.9 MHz
- Branding: US 99.9

Programming
- Format: Country
- Affiliations: Westwood One

Ownership
- Owner: Connoisseur Media; (Alpha 3E License, LLC)
- Sister stations: KATE; KAUS; KCPI

History
- First air date: May 30, 1968
- Former call signs: KAAL (1972–1974)
- Call sign meaning: "Austin"

Technical information
- Licensing authority: FCC
- Facility ID: 50660
- Class: C1
- ERP: 100,000 watts
- HAAT: 283 meters
- Transmitter coordinates: 43°37′41.8″N 93°9′12.7″W

Links
- Public license information: Public file; LMS
- Webcast: Listen live
- Website: www.myuscountry.com

KAUS-FM (99.9 MHz, "US 99.9") is a radio station broadcasting a country music format. Licensed to Austin, Minnesota, United States, the station serves the areas of Austin–Albert Lea, Rochester, Minnesota, and Mason City, Iowa. The station is owned by Connoisseur Media, through licensee Alpha 3E License, LLC.

KAUS-FM airs programming from Westwood One's "Mainstream Country Gold" format.

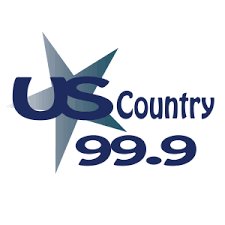
Previous logo
