= ABC Rochester =

ABC Rochester may refer to:

- WHAM-TV in Rochester, New York
- KAAL (TV) in Rochester, Minnesota
