= Richard Fitzgerald =

Richard Fitzgerald may refer to:

- Richard Fitzgerald (VC) (1831–1884), Irish recipient of the Victoria Cross
- Richard B. Fitzgerald (c. 1843–1918), American businessman
- Richard Fitzgerald (died 1776) (1733–1776), Irish Member of Parliament
- Richard FitzGerald, 3rd Earl of Kildare
- Richard Albert Fitzgerald (1806–1847), Irish Repeal Association politician
- Richard Joseph Fitzgerald (1881–1956), bishop of Gibraltar
- Richard Fitzgerald (Minnesota politician) (1829–1892), American businessman, farmer, and politician
- Rich Fitzgerald (born 1959), Pittsburgh politician and Allegheny County Executive
- Richie Fitzgerald, Irish surfer
- Dick Fitzgerald (Gaelic footballer) (1882–1930), Irish Gaelic football player
- Dick Fitzgerald (Australian footballer) (1889–1957), Australian rules footballer
- Dick Fitzgerald (basketball) (1920–1968), American basketball player
