= KAUS (AM) =

Radio station in Austin, Minnesota

- Austin, Minnesota; United States
- Broadcast area: Mower County, Minnesota
- Frequency: 1480 kHz

Programming
- Format: News/talk
- Affiliations: Bloomberg Radio; Fox News Radio; Fox Sports Radio; Compass Media Networks; Premiere Networks; Westwood One; Minnesota Twins; Minnesota Wild

Ownership
- Owner: Connoisseur Media; (Alpha 3E Licensee LLC)
- Sister stations: KATE; KAUS-FM; KCPI

History
- First air date: May 30, 1948

Technical information
- Licensing authority: FCC
- Facility ID: 50677
- Class: B
- Power: 1,000 watts
- Transmitter coordinates: 43°37′19.9″N 92°59′26.7″W

Links
- Public license information: Public file; LMS
- Webcast: Listen live
- Website: www.myaustinminnesota.com

KAUS (1480 kHz) is an AM radio station that broadcasts a news/talk format. Licensed to Austin, Minnesota, United States, the station serves the Mower County area. The station is owned by Connoisseur Media, through licensee Alpha 3E Licensee LLC.

== History ==
KAUS began broadcasting May 30, 1948, on 1480 kHz with 1 kW power (full-time). It was a Mutual affiliate, owned by Cedar Valley Broadcasting Company, Incorporated. Studios were at 405 North Main Street.

KAUS' transmitter site is adjacent to its studios south of Austin. It originally began broadcasting with the call letters of KAAL and housed the earliest incarnation of the television station known today as KAAL (formerly KAUS-TV) in its rural Austin studios. KAUS AM had been on the air since at least the mid 1960s with a pop/top 40 format and the TV station was KMMT, an ABC affiliate.

Previous logo

== Personalities ==
Bob Abbott was host of the "1480 Club" from 1948 to 1952.

The radio station's notable personality is "Champagne" Duane Germaine whose tenure at the station has surpassed all others.
