= Grand Meadow Chert Quarry/Wanhi Yukan Archaeological and Cultural Site =

Historic district in Minnesota, United States

Grand Meadow Chert Quarry/ Wanhi Yukan
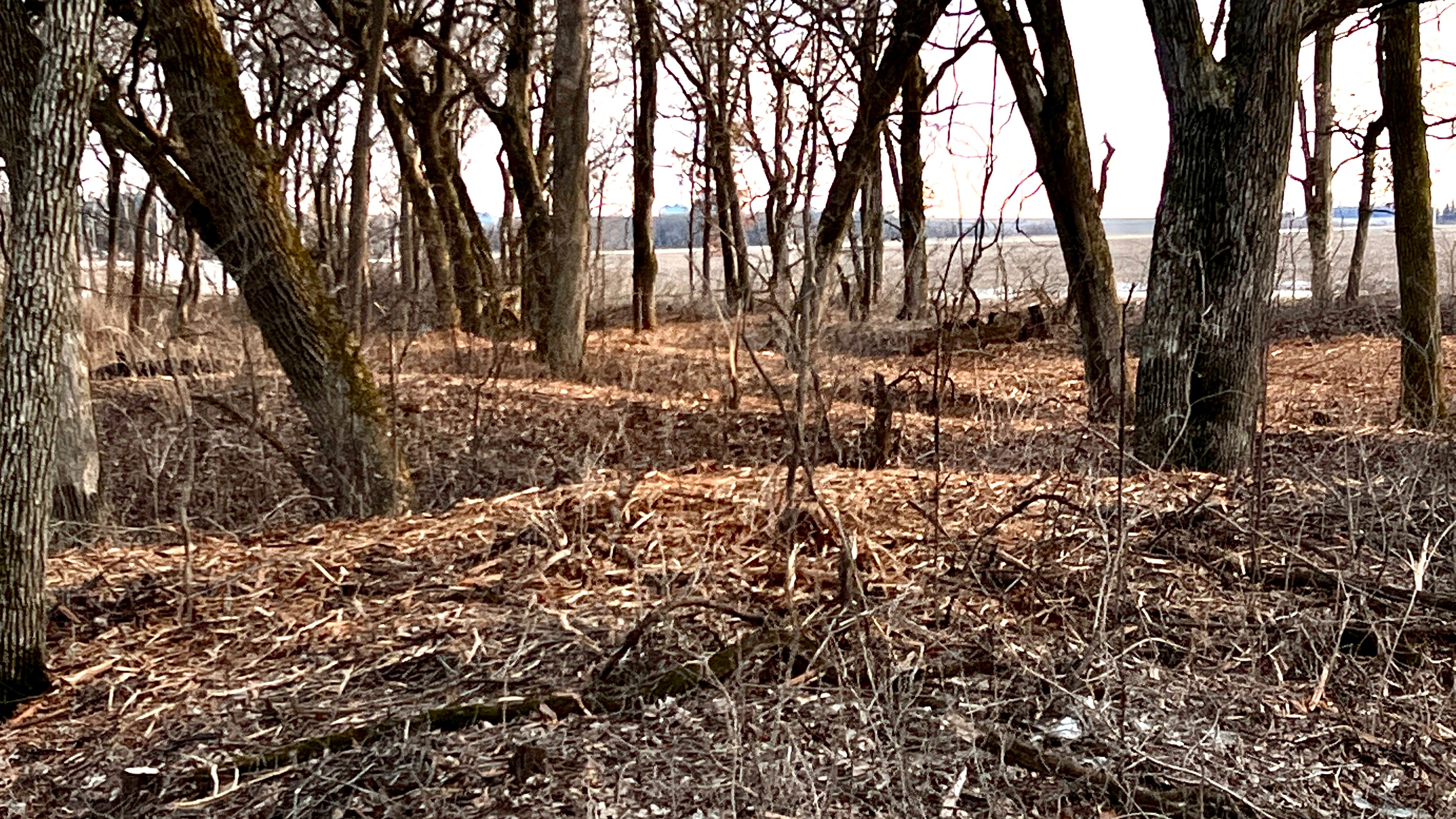
- Undisturbed quarry pits within the Grand Meadow Chert Quarry/Wanhi Yukan Preserve

- Location within Minnesota
- 43°43′40″N 92°35′20″W
- Type: Quarry
- Location: Grand Meadow Township, Minnesota, United States

Site notes
- Area: 175 acres (71 ha)
- Grand Meadow Quarry Archeological District
- U.S. National Register of Historic Places
- U.S. Historic district
- NRHP reference No.: 94000345
- Added to NRHP: April 8, 1994

The Grand Meadow Chert Quarry/Wanhi Yukan (GMC Quarry) is a 175-acre (71 ha) Indigenous archaeological site in Grand Meadow Township, Minnesota, United States that was an open pit mine where chert (or 'flint') was quarried. It is the source site for Grand Meadow Chert (GMC), and was placed on the National Register of Historic Places as the Grand Meadow Quarry Archeological District in 1994.

Originally containing well over 1000 pits apparently dug sometime between 950CE and 1400CE, the GMC Quarry/Wanhi Yukan appears to have been the most extensively-utilized Native American site in Minnesota for providing stone for making tools, and the only example in the state where there is visible evidence of chert having been extracted through digging. Nearly 100 of those pits are still visible along the Wanhi Yukan Trail in a 15-acre (6.1 ha) surviving remnant referred to as the Preserve.

Grand Meadow Chert has been found at archaeological sites in 52 counties in Minnesota, including at most precontact archaeological sites in the state that are identified as being ancestral to todays Dakota communities. It also appears at sites in Wisconsin, Iowa, and South Dakota.

The Dakota language name for the site, "Wanhi Yukan," means "There Is Chert Here." It was first documented in a 1994 atlas of Dakota place names in Minnesota.

== Geology ==
Grand Meadow Chert was formed during the Devonian period, a warm epoch when the sea levels were high enough that much of today's North America was under recurring and retreating shallow oceans. GMC occurs on top of the Bassett Member from the Little Cedar Formation of the Cedar Valley Group, the limestone layer that represents the ocean bottom from 385 million years ago. The highest expression of that sedimentary bedrock occurs near the city of Grand Meadow, Minnesota, coinciding with the thinnest layer of glacial till in the area, lying on the edge of the Driftless Zone. The chert layer is very close to the modern surface. Two waterways that pass through the archaeological site cut through the chert layer, which left nodules exposed in the shallow waters or on their sandy banks.

As it formed, the microscopically crystallized chert nodules captured numerous types of bryozoan, sponge, brachiopod, and other marine fossils, making it uniquely identifiable by its distinctive collection of specific fossil inclusions paired with its color and texture.

The stone is a satiny to waxy chert, predominantly gray in color but ranging from light gray to olive gray to dark gray. Patination is common, from olive gray to brown. The cortex typically consists of chalky cream-colored to brown calcium carbonate. Nodule fragments average three inches (8 cm) in maximum length and typically range in size from two to six inches (5–20 cm) in length, and for this reason tools made from this chert are typically not large.

== The Preserve ==
The earliest visitors to the area would have discovered chert nodules exposed in two local stream beds and been able to use those chunks of stone for making tools. The oldest known tool made from Grand Meadow Chert was a spear or dart projectile point found at a bison kill site near Granite Falls, Minnesota, in a layer with a calibrated Carbon-14 date of 7,800–8,000 years ago. For the following 7,000 years after that, all of the GMC that appears in the archaeological record in formal and informal collections can be accounted for by that straight forward means of acquiring the stone. The use of chert apparently increased through time, becoming more common at excavated Woodland period sites, and it then increases dramatically in the Mississippian period between 950CE and 1400CE at a number of village sites within 100 miles (160 km) of the chert quarry. Archaeologists believe that is when digging the quarry pits occurred, to meet an increasing demand.

The first pits were shallow, dug just alongside the creek beds to reach farther into the chert layer. While the deposit of chert nodules was nearly flat, the landscape at the chert quarry was uneven. As the early pits were exhausted and new ones were dug farther from the creeks, the line of pits eventually reached such high overburden that the pits became deep and wide, up to four meters (13 ft) deep and five meters (16 ft) wide at places. Those quarry pits were so deep that when the first colonial farmers began filling in the holes in order to claim more land for plowing, many were considered not worth the effort, and were left untouched.

Many pits remained until larger motorized farm machinery was available for accomplishing the task. The last pits that were filled in vanished in 1968, with the exception of nearly 100 pits that remain visible in a 15-acre (6.1 ha) patch of woods one mile (1.6 km) north of Grand Meadow, Minnesota, now known as the Grand Meadow Chert Quarry/Wanhi Yukan Archaeological and Cultural Preserve ("the Preserve").

The Preserve was purchased for permanent protection by The Archaeological Conservancy in 1994. It now includes the 3,800-foot (1,200 m) Wanhi Yukan Trail, opened to the public in 2025 with interpretive signage in Dakota and English developed by the Mower County Historical Society, the Prairie Island Indian Community, and Driftless Pathways.

== Digging the chert quarry pits ==
To understand the scope of work represented at the GMC Quarry, archaeologists used the extensive research from five decades of excavations and reports from the quarries for Knife River Flint in North Dakota. The mining techniques used there created a very similar landscape, and used tools that were very familiar to Indigenous farming communities in Minnesota by 1000CE. To reach the layer of GMC nodules, workers needed a variety of tools. First, they needed to cut through the prairie grasses with deep roots, for which a chert knife would have been ideal. If roots from the occasional bur oak were in the way, axes might have been needed to remove that obstacle—and archaeologists have found ground stone axes within the quarry area. A sharpened digging stick would then be used to chop into the earth to loosen the dirt, an essential tool used for planting crops in small fields along the creek sides in all of the surrounding villages at that time.

Digging through the soil produced a lot of dirt that needed to be removed. The removal of the loosened earth was accomplished by scraping the dirt into baskets using a hoe made from the shoulder blade of a bison or more rarely from stone, which is known to be the technique used by many generations for building burial and effigy mounds. The baskets of dirt were probably then handed in a daisy chain that led up and out of the deeper pits. Ramps leading out of many pits can still be seen within the chert quarry today.

The baskets of dirt were emptied on the rim of the pit where the work was underway, and some were taken to fill in an older pit. Both of those strategies can be seen at the GMC Quarry/Wanhi Yukan, where some pits are shallow compared to others nearby, while some remain very deep, with high rims of dirt. The presence of large anvil stones near some quarry pits indicates that as the nodules were removed from the holes they were tested for quality, and at least partly reduced reduced for easier transport. Debitage observed in nearby fields within the chert quarry area, along with numerous hammerstones and both large and small anvil stones, indicate that the lithic reduction of the nodules frequently occurred on site.

Flintknapping debris is widespread throughout the plowed acres in the area, and its density patterns were used to determine the extent of the original mining activities. Although few completed chipped stone tools have been found near the GMC Quarry, large quantities of broken pieces of chert tools suggest that further reduction may have occurred on the edge of pits as well, in addition to those that were transported to nearby workshop areas for the final stages of manufacturing. In some cases, whole nodules were distributed to distant villages, providing the means for later reduction and manufacturing.

== Uses of Grand Meadow Chert ==
For at least two million years chert has been a critical material in the manufacture of stone tools due to its conchoidal and controllable fracture properties and fine-grained crystalline structure. GMC, the chert from near Grand Meadow, is one of nearly 30 varieties of cherts found naturally within Minnesota. It is readily identifiable by its typically gray coloration and the presence of specific Middle Devonian period fossil inclusions. High-quality nodules from this quarry display a cryptocrystalline quartz structure that makes them especially suitable for precision knapping. When struck with skill, this material fractures predictably, allowing toolmakers to produce pieces with sharp, durable edges, making thin, light tools. Its hardness makes it suited to repeated resharpening, which is especially important for hide-scraping tools.

Artifacts made from Grand Meadow Chert—including projectile points, awls, knives, hide scrapers, engravers, and other essential tools—have been found at numerous archaeological sites across the Upper Midwest. The most frequent uses of Grand Meadow Chert appears to have been in the processing of bison hides. The sharp-edged and easily-resharpened knives and hide scrapers produced from this material were ideal for removing the hides and then scraping away the fat and hair, a labor-intensive task crucial to the production of clothing, shelter, drum skins, rugs, blankets, and other items for daily use. The demand for hides, and therefore hide scrapers, appears to increase after 950CE among the numerous and growing agricultural villages appearing along the rivers of southern Minnesota. Those communities shared many of the Mississippian cultural traits found among sites that were involved in trade with, or influenced by, the urban center of Cahokia on the Mississippi River, near what is currently St. Louis. The notable increase in demand for more hides, whether because of trading demands or due to increases in local populations, likely accounts for the increased need for more Grand Meadow Chert—inspiring the intensive digging at the chert quarry in order to acquire more stone.

Analyses from excavations show how important GMC was. Near Red Wing, Minnesota, at the Bryan Site, 73% of all hide scrapers were made of GMC, in spite of having many choices of chert that were available along the major regional trade route of the Mississippi River. At a late precontact site south of Mankato, Minnesota, on the Blue Earth River, 97% of scrapers were made of the stone from near Grand Meadow.

Because all of the known Grand Meadow Chert that has appeared in archaeological contexts has apparently come from just this one heavily utilized location, finding GMC anywhere else offers valuable data for researchers regarding the movement of chert used among different people and places, providing direct evidence of human transport and possible trade networks.

== Cultural significance ==
The Grand Meadow Chert Quarry/Wanhi Yukan, like Pipestone and other quarries, may have been an important site for more than just procuring stone. It may also have been a center for social, cultural, and spiritual interaction among Indigenous peoples. Its central location among a ring of culturally connected villages suggests how convenient it would have been for intentionally meeting extended family and friends, as well as new people from other communities who went there regularly for their chert.

Likely used as a gathering place coinciding with seasonal buffalo hunts in the spring and fall, the chert quarry would have been an ideal place for the exchange of goods, knowledge, and traditions among contemporary communities. Just as in a modern powwow, people from different places would have expected an opportunity to share stories, songs, drum rhythms, dance steps, clothing styles, beading designs, and recipes. Such gatherings also provide an important opportunity for young adults to meet people from other communities—people who are not direct relations—as well as for trading, and for participating in communal ceremonies.

If such gatherings did coincide with seasonal buffalo hunts, there may also have been a strategy that was recorded among later Dakota groups in the postcontact period: working with hunters from other communities to create larger and more effective hunting parties. This would have been an ideal place for recruiting others before heading out into the prairies for bison, along with a newly refreshed tool kit.

As at the Pipestone Quarries in Minnesota, procuring the stone was likely to have been a communal activity as well that served both practical and educational purposes. This shared labor reinforced collective identity and fostered interpersonal connections, strengthening social bonds within, and possibly among, communities. The extensive debitage found at the site suggests that various stages of tool manufacturing may have been conducted on-site, giving young flintknappers ample opportunities for learning from their elders. For the modern Indigenous communities whose ancestors dug the pits, the Grand Meadow site has become a place of cultural pride and spiritual connection, embodying both historical and contemporary efforts to reconnect with ancestral lands and preserve cultural heritage.

== Archaeological investigations at the Preserve ==
Although a distinctive gray chert was widely recognized by archaeologists working at Middle Mississippian sites in southern Minnesota and northern Iowa, the geological source of the material remained unknown until the late 20th century. The open-pit chert quarry was first identified in 1952 by local rock collector and artifact enthusiast Maynard Green. However, it wasn’t until 1980 that the chert quarry was formally surveyed and recorded in the Minnesota State Archaeological Site Database as site 21MW0008.

Archaeologists Tom Trow, Lee Radzak, and John Hunn from the Minnesota Historical Society first documented the site, noting extensive surface scatters of chert flakes indicating that the area had been used for both raw material procurement and multiple stages of stone tool production. Based on the debitage found in the surrounding fields, they determined that the original full chert quarry covered at least 175 acres. Nearly all of that land now has been filled in and covered over by agricultural activities going back to the late 1800’s.

In 1994, the site was added to the National Register of Historic Places. That same year, the small wooded plot and surrounding grassland was purchased by The Archaeological Conservancy for permanent preservation and protection, the result of efforts by Maynard Green and archaeologist Orrin Shane at the Science Museum of Minnesota.

New investigations at the preserve were begun in 2023 by the Hamline University Center for Anthropological Services, the first archaeological work on site since 1980. In 2025, Minnesota State University at Mankato archaeologists working for the Prairie Island Indian Community and the Mower County Historical Society began employing geophysics to guide the creation of research plans for future archeological investigation.

The Preserve is analogous to important regional toolstone sources such as the Silver Mound Quarry Complex for Hixton Silicified Sandstone in Wisconsin, and the Knife River Flint Quarries of North Dakota.

== The Wanhi Yukan Trail ==
In 2020, the Mower County Historical Society and Project Director Tom Trow, in partnership with the Prairie Island Indian Community, initiated development of a self-guided interpretive program for visitors known as the Wanhi Yukan Trail. Trail construction was accomplished by Great Lakes Trailbuilders, working with Wisconsin's Conservation Corps. The signage was designed by Driftless Pathways of Wisconsin and is presented in both Dakota and English, using content developed with members of the Prairie Island Indian Community. The Wanhi Yukan Trail opened to the public on July 1, 2025, and is available without fee to visitors Spring through Fall. A companion exhibit at the Mower County Historical Society in Austin, Minnesota, displays many dozens of artifacts, and samples of Grand Meadow Chert are available by request.

== Environment and restorations ==
In addition to its historical and cultural significance, the Grand Meadow Chert Quarry/Wanhi Yukan Preserve is also an important ecological area undergoing restoration efforts aimed at reviving its original oak savanna and prairie biomes. In an effort to restore this ecosystem, seeds from surviving prairie plots within 12 miles (19 km) of the chert quarry have been located by the Minnesota Department of Natural Resources (DNR) and harvested to repopulate native plant species. This hyper-local prairie and savanna seeds closely approximates the original plant cover, consisting of various grasses, wildflowers, forbs, and shrubs. The restoration project also focuses on removing invasive species, particularly the aggressive buckthorn that once overwhelmed the Preserve.

As a rare patch of oak savanna and prairie within a county that is nearly 90% cultivated, the GMC Quarry/Wanhi Yukan Preserve is home to a wide variety of flora and fauna that are benefiting from the restoration efforts and the overall biodiversity at the site. Its national eBird Hotspot listing notes 62 species of migrating and nesting birds, including red-headed woodpeckers.
