= Richard Fitzgerald (Minnesota politician) =

American politician (1829–1892)

Member of the Minnesota House of Representatives from the 5th district
- In office January 5, 1875 – January 3, 1876

Personal details
- Born: Richard Patrick Fitzgerald; September 14, 1829 County Tipperary, Ireland
- Died: November 20, 1892 (aged 63)
- Cause of death: Concussion
- Resting place: Saint Aidan Catholic Cemetery, Bath Township, Freeborn County, Minnesota, U.S.
- Relatives: Tom J. Shea (great-great nephew)
- Occupation: Politician, farmer, businessman

Richard Patrick Fitzgerald (September 14, 1829 – November 20, 1892) was an American politician, farmer, and businessman who served in the Minnesota House of Representatives from 1875 to 1876, representing the 5th legislative district of Minnesota in the 17th Minnesota Legislature.

== Early life ==
Fitzgerald was born in County Tipperary, Ireland, on September 14, 1829. He emigrated to the United States, settling in Minnesota in 1857.

== Career ==
Fitzgerald served in the Minnesota House of Representatives from 1875 to 1876, representing the 5th legislative district of Minnesota in the 17th Minnesota Legislature.

During his time in office, Fitzgerald served on the following committees:

- Rules and Joint Rules
- Towns and Counties

Fitzgerald's tenure began on January 5, 1875, and concluded on January 3, 1876. His district included representation for Freeborn County.

Outside of the Minnesota Legislature, Fitzgerald was a farmer. He was also involved with the banking business.

== Personal life and death ==
Fitzgerald was married. He resided in Albert Lea, Minnesota.

Fitzgerald was driving to his home in Albert Lea when he was thrown from his horse-drawn wagon and suffered a fatal concussion. Fitzgerald died at the age of 63 on November 20, 1892. He was buried in Saint Aidan Catholic Cemetery, located in Bath Township, Freeborn County, Minnesota.

Fitzgerald's great-great nephew Tom J. Shea also served in the Minnesota Legislature.

Minnesota House of Representatives
Preceded by —	Member of the Minnesota House of Representatives from the 5th district 1875–1876	Succeeded by —
