= Joan Claire Graham =

- Born: Joan Graham; November 21, 1945 (age 80); Albert Lea, Minnesota, United States
- Occupation: Writer/editor
- Website: minnesotamemories.com

Joan Claire Graham (November 21, 1945) is a songwriter, playwright, publisher, editor, and writer. Among other literary endeavors, she is known for her chronicling of Minnesota history.

== Early life and education ==
Born in Albert Lea, Minnesota on November 21, 1945, she grew up in a middle class home in Albert Lea. Her father was a union worker at Wilson & Co., a meat processing plant, (which at one time was the largest employer in Albert Lea), and her mother was a special education teacher. Her mother was among the first special education teachers to work with students who would have otherwise been institutionalized.

Graham graduated from Winona State University.

== Career ==
- Co-director, playwright and songwriter for the Children's Musical Theatre Production Workshop in Los Angeles from 1987 to 1992.
- Teacher in Minnesota, California and Maryland from 1967 to 2003.
- Writer, Editor and Co-founder of Graham Megyeri Books, a micro press that specializes in Minnesota historical non-fiction, such as the Minnesota Memories series of 7 books, A Boy From C-11, Austin Remembers, Albert Lea Remembers, and Crackers and Milk.
- Playwright and lyricist for Tales of Two Counties, a Minnesota Sesquicentennial Project.

== Projects ==
=== Minnesota Memories, Albert Lea Remembers, Austin Remembers ===
Joan Claire Graham traveled throughout Minnesota collecting hundreds of true stories, which were published in Minnesota Memories, Austin Remembers and Albert Lea Remembers. Some have historic scope, while others are humorous, heart warming, reflective, unusual or tragic. All provide a look into the lives of real Minnesota people. Most contributors were writers who had not previously published stories.

=== A Boy from C11 ===
Joan Claire Graham edited A Boy from C11, which is a story written by Harvey Ronglien, who grew up at the Minnesota State Public School Orphanage in Owatonna, Minnesota.

=== Tales of Two Counties ===
Tales of Two Counties was written and produced by Joan Claire Graham. Music for this production was done by Tom Shelton. Graham took stories from Albert Lea Remembers and Austin Remembers and edited them down into a show which featured community actors doing dramatic readings of the stories. After several stories, the actors sang songs which featured themes from the stories. Tales of Two Counties was funded, in part, by a grant from the Minnesota State Sesquicentennial Committee.
