= Albert Lea Public Library =

Public library in Minnesota, United States

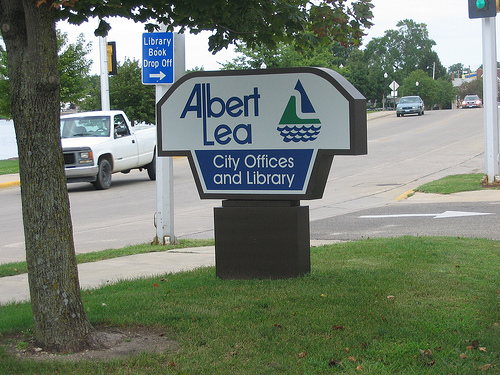
- Albert Lea Public Library
- 43.6505128°N 93.3665988°W
- Location: 211 East Clark Street; Albert Lea MN 56007
- Type: Public Library
- Established: 1899

Other information
- Director: Annice Sevett
- Website: http://www.alplonline.org/

The Albert Lea Public Library serves the City of Albert Lea, Minnesota and surrounding communities, and is a member of Southeastern Libraries Cooperating, the SE Minnesota library region. Renovated in 2007, the library features a state of the art computer lab and 20 public access computers. Wi-Fi service is also available to patrons and guests.

The Children's Library features programs for infants and adolescents: Story Time, Nighttime Story Time and L.A.F. (Library Afternoon Fun).

Adult programming includes basic computer classes, one-on-one computer instruction, a Nonfiction Bookclub, a fiction book club, the "Fountain Lake Readers." and presentations by authors.

Art donated from local artists is on display throughout the entire library. A mural by artist Chandler Anderson is featured in the Children's Library.

The Albert Lea Public Library has been housed in the City Center building since 1968. A free public library has existed in the City of Albert Lea since 1899.
