= Tom J. Shea =

American businessman and politician

Tom J. Shea (born July 14, 1950) was an American businessman and politician.

Shea was born in Owatonna, Minnesota and graduated from Marian Catholic High School in Owatonna. He went to the University of Minnesota and Mankato State University. He lived in Owatonna, Minnesota with his wife and family and worked for the Shea Company, Inc. as vice-present and general manager. Shea served in the Minnesota House of Representatives from 1981 to 1984 and was a Democrat. He then served on the Steele County Commission from 1991 to 2010 and then served as Steele County administrator in 2011. Shea was also involved with the Steele County Agricultural Society, which operates the Steele County Free Fair.

His great-great uncle Richard Fitzgerald also served in the Minnesota Legislature.
