= John A. Lovely =

American judge

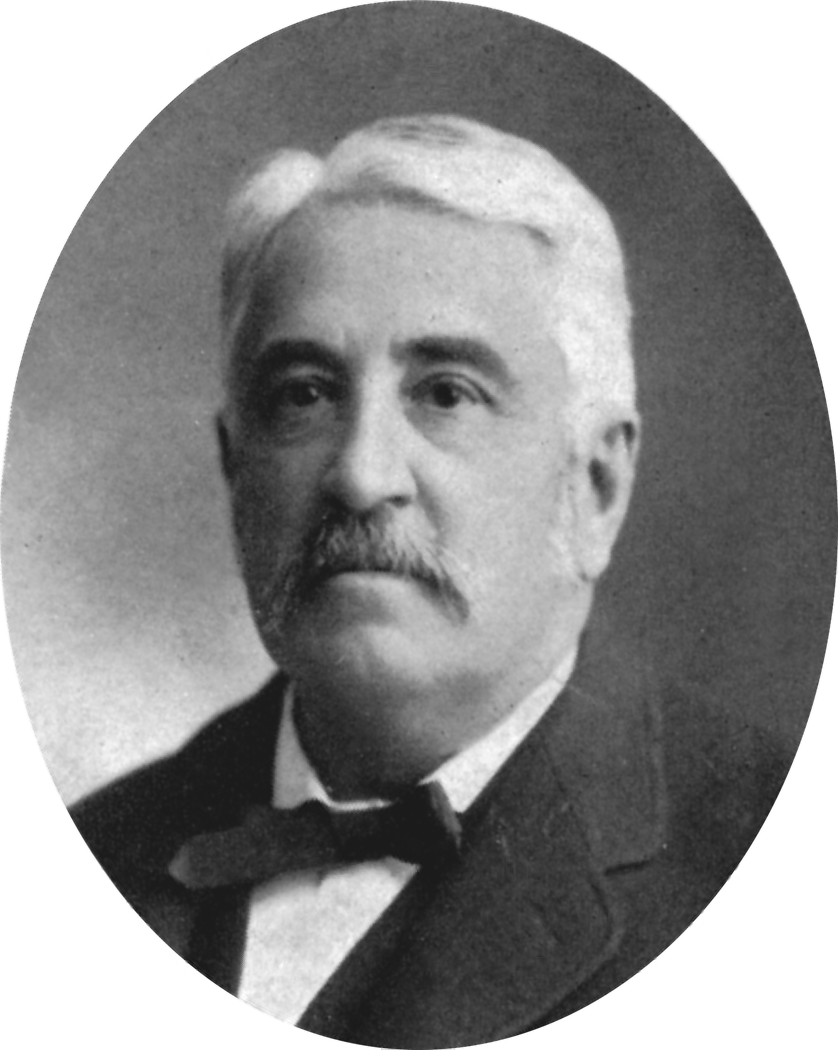
John A. Lovely

John A. Lovely (November 18, 1843 – January 28, 1908) was an American lawyer and jurist.

Born in Burlington, Vermont, Lovely was admitted to the Wisconsin bar in Milwaukee, Wisconsin, in 1866. He then practiced law in Watertown, Wisconsin. In 1867, Lovely moved to Albert Lea, Minnesota and continued to practice law. From 1869 to 1874, Lovely served as county attorney for Freeborn County, Minnesota. Lovely served on the Minnesota Supreme Court from 1900 to 1905. He died at his home in Albert Lea, Minnesota.
