= Warren Stowell =

American politician (born 1941)

Warren Tom Stowell (born November 6, 1941) was an American businessman, teacher, and politician.

Stowell was born in Albert Lea, Minnesota and graduated from Albert Lea High School in Albert Lea, Minnesota. He served in the United States Navy from 1960 to 1964. Stowell received his associate of arts degree from Austin Associate College, his bachelor's degree in history and education, and master's degree from Winona State University. Stowell lived in Lewiston, Minnesota with his wife and family and taught in the Lewiston Public Schools. He retired from Maple River Public school district where he was the high school principal. He was also involved with the building supplies business. Stowell served in the Minnesota House of Representatives from 1979 to 1982 and was a Republican.
