= Grand Meadow, Minnesota =

City in Minnesota, United States

- City
- Motto: "A Great Place to Live"
- Location in Mower County and the state of Minnesota
- Coordinates: 43°42′22″N 92°34′13″W
- Country: United States
- State: Minnesota
- County: Mower

Area
  - Total: 0.68 sq mi (1.77 km^{2})
  - Land: 0.68 sq mi (1.77 km^{2})
  - Water: 0 sq mi (0.00 km^{2})
- Elevation: 1,352 ft (412 m)

Population (2020)
  - Total: 1,127
  - Density: 1,651.5/sq mi (637.64/km^{2})
- Time zone: UTC-6 (Central (CST))
  - Summer (DST): UTC-5 (CDT)
- ZIP code: 55936
- Area code: 507
- FIPS code: 27-25010
- GNIS feature ID: 2394951
- Website: www.cityofgrandmeadow.com

Grand Meadow is a city in Mower County, Minnesota, United States. The city is on the boundary between Grand Meadow Township and Frankford Township, and it is politically independent of both townships. The population was 1,127 at the 2020 census.

== History ==
Grand Meadow was platted in 1870, and named for the prairies near the original town site.

== Geography ==
Grand Meadow is in eastern Mower County and is bordered to the west by Grand Meadow Township and to the east by Frankford Township. Minnesota State Highway 16 runs along the city's northern border, leading west 7 miles (11 km) to Dexter and east 9 miles (14 km) to Spring Valley. Austin, the Mower county seat, is 21 miles (34 km) to the west.

According to the U.S. Census Bureau, Grand Meadow has an area of 0.68 square miles (1.76 km^{2}), all land. The city sits on a low ridge that drains northwest toward the South Fork of Bear Creek and southeast toward Deer Creek. The two creeks flow east and join at Fillmore to form the Middle Branch of the Root River, a tributary of the Mississippi River.

=== Climate ===
Climate data for Grand Meadow, Minnesota, 1991–2020 normals, extremes 1891–present
Month	Jan	Feb	Mar	Apr	May	Jun	Jul	Aug	Sep	Oct	Nov	Dec	Year
Record high °F (°C)	57 (14)	63 (17)	83 (28)	91 (33)	107 (42)	105 (41)	107 (42)	102 (39)	100 (38)	92 (33)	78 (26)	64 (18)	107 (42)
Mean maximum °F (°C)	40.0 (4.4)	43.3 (6.3)	61.7 (16.5)	77.3 (25.2)	85.6 (29.8)	89.8 (32.1)	90.0 (32.2)	88.1 (31.2)	85.5 (29.7)	79.4 (26.3)	62.4 (16.9)	44.8 (7.1)	92.4 (33.6)
Mean daily maximum °F (°C)	20.9 (−6.2)	25.3 (−3.7)	37.9 (3.3)	53.5 (11.9)	66.1 (18.9)	76.2 (24.6)	79.3 (26.3)	77.4 (25.2)	71.1 (21.7)	57.2 (14.0)	40.6 (4.8)	27.1 (−2.7)	52.7 (11.5)
Daily mean °F (°C)	12.7 (−10.7)	16.8 (−8.4)	29.0 (−1.7)	42.7 (5.9)	55.2 (12.9)	66.0 (18.9)	69.0 (20.6)	66.7 (19.3)	59.4 (15.2)	46.2 (7.9)	32.0 (0.0)	19.6 (−6.9)	42.9 (6.1)
Mean daily minimum °F (°C)	4.6 (−15.2)	8.2 (−13.2)	20.1 (−6.6)	31.9 (−0.1)	44.3 (6.8)	55.7 (13.2)	58.6 (14.8)	56.0 (13.3)	47.8 (8.8)	35.3 (1.8)	23.4 (−4.8)	12.2 (−11.0)	33.2 (0.7)
Mean minimum °F (°C)	−17.4 (−27.4)	−13.6 (−25.3)	−3.8 (−19.9)	19.8 (−6.8)	30.9 (−0.6)	43.7 (6.5)	48.9 (9.4)	46.0 (7.8)	33.3 (0.7)	20.7 (−6.3)	6.1 (−14.4)	−10.3 (−23.5)	−20.7 (−29.3)
Record low °F (°C)	−38 (−39)	−36 (−38)	−31 (−35)	1 (−17)	20 (−7)	32 (0)	37 (3)	34 (1)	22 (−6)	−5 (−21)	−16 (−27)	−30 (−34)	−38 (−39)
Average precipitation inches (mm)	1.02 (26)	0.87 (22)	1.85 (47)	3.90 (99)	5.06 (129)	5.70 (145)	4.66 (118)	4.22 (107)	4.07 (103)	2.95 (75)	1.82 (46)	1.25 (32)	37.37 (949)
Average snowfall inches (cm)	11.0 (28)	10.8 (27)	8.5 (22)	2.9 (7.4)	0.5 (1.3)	0.0 (0.0)	0.0 (0.0)	0.0 (0.0)	0.0 (0.0)	0.6 (1.5)	2.5 (6.4)	13.8 (35)	50.6 (128.6)
Average precipitation days (≥ 0.01 in)	6.5	5.4	6.9	10.7	13.0	12.0	9.3	9.4	8.7	8.7	6.7	7.3	104.6
Average snowy days (≥ 0.1 in)	7.0	5.4	3.9	1.6	0.1	0.0	0.0	0.0	0.0	0.5	2.7	6.9	28.1
Source 1: NOAA
Source 2: National Weather Service

=== Transportation ===
The city is at the intersection of Mower County Road 8 and Minnesota State Highway 16. It was served by the Milwaukee Road railroad until the late 1970s.

=== Parks ===
Parks in the city are:

- Pine Lawn, east of town on State Highway 16
- City Park, on 1st Avenue SE
- Veterans Memorial Park, on the site of the old Grand Meadow school
- Grand Meadow School park, at the school

== Demographics ==
Historical population
Census	Pop.	Note	%±
1880	374		—
1890	373		−0.3%
1900	477		27.9%
1910	552		15.7%
1920	579		4.9%
1930	585		1.0%
1940	700		19.7%
1950	766		9.4%
1960	837		9.3%
1970	869		3.8%
1980	965		11.0%
1990	967		0.2%
2000	945		−2.3%
2010	1,139		20.5%
2020	1,127		−1.1%
U.S. Decennial Census

=== 2010 census ===
As of the census of 2010, there were 1,139 people, 454 households, and 287 families residing in the city. The population density was 1,700.0 inhabitants per square mile (656.4/km^{2}). There were 485 housing units at an average density of 723.9 per square mile (279.5/km^{2}). The racial makeup of the city was 96.7% White, 1.4% African American, 0.1% Native American, 0.5% Asian, 0.7% from other races, and 0.6% from two or more races. Hispanic or Latino of any race were 2.2% of the population.

There were 454 households, of which 36.6% had children under the age of 18 living with them, 47.6% were married couples living together, 11.9% had a female householder with no husband present, 3.7% had a male householder with no wife present, and 36.8% were non-families. 33.5% of all households were made up of individuals, and 17.7% had someone living alone who was 65 years of age or older. The average household size was 2.43 and the average family size was 3.11.

The median age in the city was 36.3 years. 29% of residents were under the age of 18; 5.8% were between the ages of 18 and 24; 26.2% were from 25 to 44; 21.6% were from 45 to 64; and 17.2% were 65 years of age or older. The gender makeup of the city was 47.2% male and 52.8% female.

=== 2000 census ===
As of the census of 2000, there were 945 people, 395 households, and 233 families residing in the city. The population density was 1,470.9 inhabitants per square mile (567.9/km^{2}). There were 407 housing units at an average density of 633.5 per square mile (244.6/km^{2}). The racial makeup of the city was 98.73% White, 0.21% Native American, 0.11% Asian, 0.63% from other races, and 0.32% from two or more races. Hispanic or Latino of any race were 0.63% of the population.

There were 395 households, out of which 28.4% had children under the age of 18 living with them, 49.1% were married couples living together, 7.3% had a female householder with no husband present, and 40.8% were non-families. 35.2% of all households were made up of individuals, and 16.5% had someone living alone who was 65 years of age or older. The average household size was 2.29 and the average family size was 3.04.

In the city, the population was spread out, with 24.4% under the age of 18, 8.7% from 18 to 24, 28.0% from 25 to 44, 18.9% from 45 to 64, and 19.9% who were 65 years of age or older. The median age was 37 years. For every 100 females, there were 87.5 males. For every 100 females age 18 and over, there were 78.9 males.

The median income for a household in the city was $38,188, and the median income for a family was $46,667. Males had a median income of $29,427 versus $23,333 for females. The per capita income for the city was $18,509. About 5.9% of families and 4.8% of the population were below the poverty line, including 5.3% of those under age 18 and 4.6% of those age 65 or over.

== Landmarks ==
=== Grand Meadow Public School ===
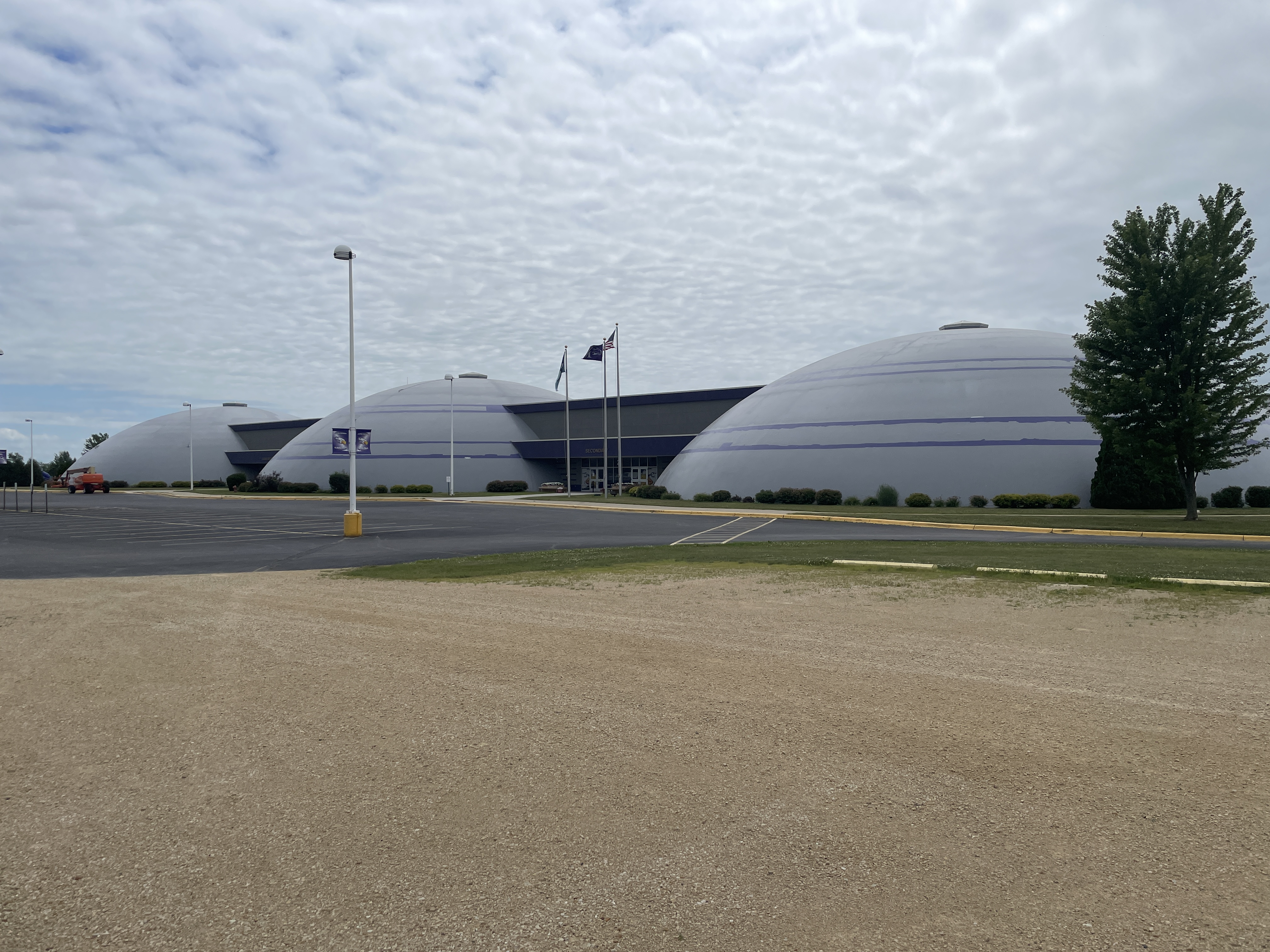
Grand Meadow Public School has a unique design with several domes.

This is Minnesota's largest monolithic dome school. It houses the K-12 grades from Grand Meadow in five separate domes. The domes are lettered A, B, C, D and E. Dome A is the secondary dome, which has the junior and senior high. Dome B is the administrative dome with the elementary and high school offices and media center. Dome C is the elementary dome with grades Pre-K through 6. Dome D, the athletics dome, has the gymnasium, wrestling room, and weight room. The arts dome is Dome E, with the band room, art room, and cafetorium. Two purple stripes go around each dome.

=== Grand Army of the Republic (G.A.R.) Hall--Booth Post No. 130 ===
Booth Post No. 130 was once a meeting hall for members of the Grand Army of the Republic. The hall is apparently one of only two remaining in Minnesota and is on the west side of South Main Street between First Avenue SW and Second Avenue SW. The building is on the National Register of Historic Places because of its architectural and social significance.

Grand Meadow Chert Quarry / Wanhi Yukan Archaeological Site

The Grand Meadow Chert Quarry was the most extensively utilized Native American site in the state for providing stone for making tools, and the only example where there is visible evidence of where chert was extracted through digging. The 8-acre wooded preserve features a self-guided walking trail with a dozen interpretive signs that reveal the story of the chert quarry from over 1000 years ago. Nearly 100 quarry pits are still easily visible, nearly untouched for the past 600 years. Free and open to the public; a companion archaeological exhibit is at the Mower County Historical Society in Austin, Minnesota on the county fair grounds.
