= Albert Lea Municipal Airport =

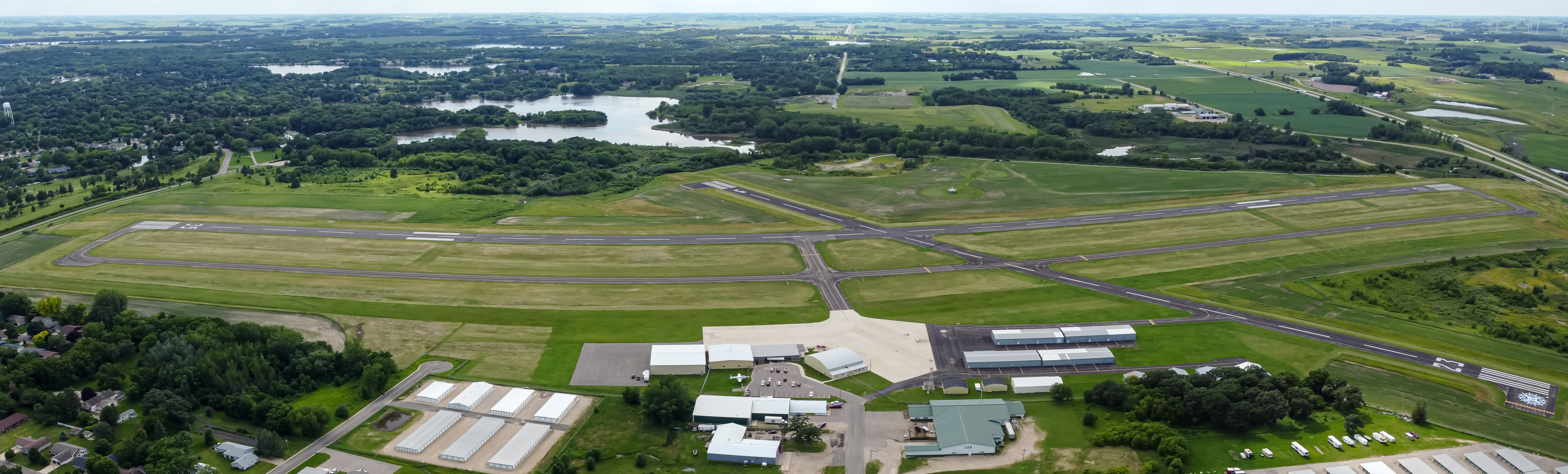
- IATA: AEL; ICAO: KAEL; FAA LID: AEL

Summary
- Airport type: Public
- Owner: City of Albert Lea
- Serves: Albert Lea, Minnesota
- Elevation AMSL: 1,261 ft (384 m)
- Coordinates: 43°40′52″N 093°22′05″W
- Website: www.cityofalbertlea.org

Map
- Location within Minnesota Location within the United States

Runways
Direction	Length		Surface
Direction	ft	m	Surface
17/35	5,000	1,524	Asphalt
5/23	2,898	883	Asphalt

Statistics (2020)
- Aircraft operations (year ending 6/30/2020): 26,175
- Based aircraft: 37
- Source: Federal Aviation Administration

Albert Lea Municipal Airport (IATA: AEL, ICAO: KAEL, FAA LID: AEL) is in Albert Lea, in Freeborn County, Minnesota, United States.

Albert Lea Municipal Airport was granted over $3 million through several federal funds to relocate the main runway in the early 2010's. The first funding announcement was followed by another announcement about a grant to rehabilitate the crosswind runway. Work began in 2011 and was completed within a year. The old runway, which parallels the new runway, was converted to serve as the new runway's taxiway. The cost of making the additions and redoing the old pieces of the airport runway totaled $9,500,000.00. This allowed the Albert Lea Municipal Airport to finally have a 5,000-foot runway.

Later on, in July 2017, it was reported that the Albert Lea Municipal Airport was awarded more than $766,000 by the U.S. Dept. of Transportation. This money was used for the construction of a 4,300 sq ft. airport arrival and departure building and parking lot. A month later, in August 2017, it was reported that the Albert Lea City Council unanimously authorized their last three funding agreements. It was noted that the U.S. Dept. of Transportation funded $766,00, the State funded $948,300.00, and the City of Albert Lea paid $436,500 for the project. The overall estimated cost of the project was around $2,150,000.00 which was noted as slightly higher than the bid from a previous year. The project was completed in the summer of 2018.

== Facilities ==
The airport covers 273 acres (110 ha) at an elevation of 1,261 feet (384 m). It has two asphalt runways: 17/35 is 5,000 by 100 feet (1,524 x 30 m) and 5/23 is 2,898 by 75 feet (883 x 23 m).

In the year ending June 30, 2020, the airport had 26,175 aircraft operations, average 72 per day: 91% general aviation, 8% air taxi and 1% military. 37 aircraft were then based at the airport: 32 single-engine, 3 multi-engine, 1 jet and 1 helicopter.

== Soaring contests ==
Albert Lea Airport hosts soaring contests, usually the week after Mother's Day in May. The airport is the only site in the United States to have hosted all seven classes of glider competition.

- 1992 U.S. Region 7 Contest
- 1993 1-26 Championships
- 1995 U.S. Sports Class Nationals
- 1997 U.S. 15 meter Nationals
- 1999 U.S. World Class Nationals and Region 7 Contest
- 2002 U.S. Region 7 Contest
- 2005 U.S. Region 7 Contest
- 2007 U.S. Open Class Nationals, 18 meter Nationals, and Region 7 Sport Class Contest
- 2015 U.S. Region 7 Contest
- 2016 U.S. Region 7 Contest
- 2018 U.S. Region 7 Contest
- 2019 U.S. 20 meter Multi-place Nationals and Region 7 Contest

From 1990 to 2008 Albert Lea was the host site for the International Aerobatic Club Doug Yost Challenge Aerobatic Competition. This contest was moved to Spencer, Iowa due to construction in the area needed for the contest.

== See also ==
- List of airports in Minnesota
