= KCPI =

Radio station in Albert Lea, Minnesota

- Albert Lea, Minnesota; United States
- Broadcast area: Albert Lea–Austin–Mason City
- Frequency: 94.9 MHz
- Branding: 94.9 The Breeze

Programming
- Format: Adult contemporary
- Affiliations: Compass Media Networks

Ownership
- Owner: Connoisseur Media; (Alpha 3E License, LLC)
- Sister stations: KATE, KAUS (AM), KAUS-FM

History
- First air date: July 16, 1974
- Call sign meaning: Communications Properties Incorporated (original owner)

Technical information
- Licensing authority: FCC
- Facility ID: 12706
- Class: A
- ERP: 5,000 watts
- HAAT: 90 meters (300 ft)
- Transmitter coordinates: 43.633°N 93.371°W

Links
- Public license information: Public file; LMS
- Webcast: Listen live
- Website: www.thebreeze949.com

KCPI (94.9 FM, "94.9 The Breeze") is a radio station broadcasting an adult contemporary format. Licensed to Albert Lea, Minnesota, United States, the station serves the Albert Lea–Austin–Mason City area. The station is currently owned by Connoisseur Media, through licensee Alpha 3E License, LLC.

KCPI airs programming from Westwood One's "Adult Contemporary" format. The station was an affiliate of The Bob and Sheri Show.

Previous logo
