= Alfred Berglund (politician) =

American politician (1871–1962)

Member of the Minnesota Senate from the 6th district
- In office 1935–1946

Personal details
- Born: December 17, 1871 Albert Lea, Minnesota, U.S.
- Died: November 20, 1962 (aged 90) Youngtown, Arizona, U.S.
- Party: Independent
- Spouse: Rachel Berglund
- Children: 4

Alfred Berglund Sr. (December 17, 1871 – November 20, 1962) was an American farmer and politician.

== Early life ==
Alfred Berglund was born in Albert Lea, Minnesota, on December 17, 1871, the son of John Berglund (1834-1904) and Anna Marie Persdotter (1831-1934). Both his mother and father were immigrants from Sweden and had come from the village of Torpshammar.

Alfred attended Albert Lea Country School until graduation, when he started working as a farmer in the city.

== Marriage and family ==
Berglund married for the first time on June 14, 1898 in Isanti, Minnesota to Sadie Christine Olund (1873-1942). Together, they had the following children.

- Olive Eleanor A. Berglund (1902-1957)
- Mabel Pearl Berglund (1904-1978)
- Mildred Sigrid Berglund (1911-1999)
- Alfred Berglund Jr (1914-1977)

== Career ==
Berglund lived with his wife and family in Albert Lea, Minnesota. He was a farmer. Berglund served in the Minnesota Senate from 1935 to 1946. He later worked as director of the Freeborn County Historical Society.
