= Bath Township, Freeborn County, Minnesota =

Township in Minnesota, United States

Bath Township
- Township
- Location within the state of Minnesota Bath Township (the United States)
- Coordinates: 43°48′0″N 93°20′12″W
- Country: United States
- State: Minnesota
- County: Freeborn

Area
  - Total: 35.8 sq mi (92.8 km^{2})
  - Land: 35.7 sq mi (92.5 km^{2})
  - Water: 0.12 sq mi (0.3 km^{2})
- Elevation: 1,250 ft (381 m)

Population (2000)
  - Total: 479
  - Density: 13/sq mi (5.2/km^{2})
- Time zone: UTC-6 (Central (CST))
  - Summer (DST): UTC-5 (CDT)
- FIPS code: 27-03934
- GNIS feature ID: 0663520

Bath Township is a township in Freeborn County, Minnesota, United States. The population was 479 at the 2000 census.

== History ==
Bath Township was organized in 1858, and named after Bath, New York, the former home of an early settler.

== Geography ==
According to the United States Census Bureau, the township has a total area of 35.8 square miles (93 km^{2}), of which 35.7 square miles (92 km^{2}) is land and 0.1 square miles (0.26 km^{2}) (0.31%) is water.

== Demographics ==
As of the census of 2000, there were 479 people, 180 households, and 136 families residing in the township. The population density was 13.4 inhabitants per square mile (5.2/km^{2}). There were 186 housing units at an average density of 5.2 per square mile (2.0/km^{2}). The racial makeup of the township was 97.91% White, 0.63% African American, 0.21% Native American, 0.21% Asian, 0.21% from other races, and 0.84% from two or more races. Hispanic or Latino of any race were 2.09% of the population.

There were 180 households, out of which 37.8% had children under the age of 18 living with them, 67.8% were married couples living together, 3.3% had a female householder with no husband present, and 23.9% were non-families. 21.1% of all households were made up of individuals, and 9.4% had someone living alone who was 65 years of age or older. The average household size was 2.66 and the average family size was 3.09.

In the township the population was spread out, with 29.2% under the age of 18, 5.4% from 18 to 24, 25.9% from 25 to 44, 26.9% from 45 to 64, and 12.5% who were 65 years of age or older. The median age was 40 years. For every 100 females, there were 111.9 males. For every 100 females age 18 and over, there were 115.9 males.

The median income for a household in the township was $34,773, and the median income for a family was $42,778. Males had a median income of $30,000 versus $24,038 for females. The per capita income for the township was $16,835. About 2.2% of families and 3.5% of the population were below the poverty line, including 2.3% of those under age 18 and none of those age 65 or over.
