= Grand Meadow Township, Mower County, Minnesota =

Grand Meadow Township, Minnesota
- Township
- Interactive map of Grand Meadow Township, Minnesota
- Coordinates: 43°42′37″N 92°37′30″W
- Country: United States
- State: Minnesota
- County: Mower

Area
  - Total: 35.7 sq mi (92.5 km^{2})
  - Land: 35.7 sq mi (92.5 km^{2})
  - Water: 0 sq mi (0.0 km^{2})
- Elevation: 1,348 ft (411 m)

Population (2000)
  - Total: 344
  - Density: 9.6/sq mi (3.7/km^{2})
- Time zone: UTC-6 (Central (CST))
  - Summer (DST): UTC-5 (CDT)
- ZIP code: 55936
- Area code: 507
- FIPS code: 27-25028
- GNIS feature ID: 0664315

Grand Meadow Township is a township in Mower County, Minnesota, United States. The population was 344 at the 2000 census. The city of Grand Meadow, lies on the eastern boundary of Grand Meadow. All other areas of the township are unincorporated areas. The township was named for the typical landscapes within its borders.

== History ==
The earliest archaeological evidence of Native Americans in the township is from 8,000 years ago, continuing until the earliest modern settlers in the 19th century. Starting about 1000 years ago, ancestors to today's Dakota people began digging over 1000 pits near Grand Meadow in section 13 to obtain a special stone known as chert. Today, a small portion of the Grand Meadow Chert Quarry/Wanhi Yukan Archaeological Site is open to the public, with a trail and interpretive signs.

Erland Olson built a log house in section 12 in 1854 and the township was officially organized in 1862 in a meeting at the B.F. Lanhworthy home. At that meeting, the people of the township elected a chairman, a clerk, a treasurer, two justices of the peace and two constables.

== Geography ==
According to the United States Census Bureau, the township has a total area of 35.7 square miles (92 km^{2}), all land.

== Demographics ==
As of the census of 2000, there were 344 people, 109 households, and 96 families residing in the township. The population density was 9.6 inhabitants per square mile (3.7/km^{2}). There were 118 housing units at an average density of 3.3 per square mile (1.3/km^{2}). The racial makeup of the township was 98.84% White, 0.87% Asian, 0.29% from other races. Hispanic or Latino of any race were 0.29% of the population.

There were 109 households, out of which 45.0% had children under the age of 18 living with them, 81.7% were married couples living together, 2.8% had a female householder with no husband present, and 11.9% were non-families. 11.9% of all households were made up of individuals, and 7.3% had someone living alone who was 65 years of age or older. The average household size was 3.16 and the average family size was 3.40.

In the township the population was spread out, with 34.0% under the age of 18, 7.0% from 18 to 24, 27.0% from 25 to 44, 15.4% from 45 to 64, and 16.6% who were 65 years of age or older. The median age was 36 years. For every 100 females, there were 108.5 males. For every 100 females age 18 and over, there were 112.1 males.

The median income for a household in the township was $52,344, and the median income for a family was $56,250. Males had a median income of $36,500 versus $26,607 for females. The per capita income for the township was $19,984. None of the families and 2.0% of the population were living below the poverty line, including no under eighteens and none of those over 64.

== Cemetery ==
- St. Finbarr's Catholic Cemetery is located in the southwest corner of the northwest quadrant of section 13 of the township. It is one mile north and one half mile west of Grand Meadow.
