= Jodi Jill =

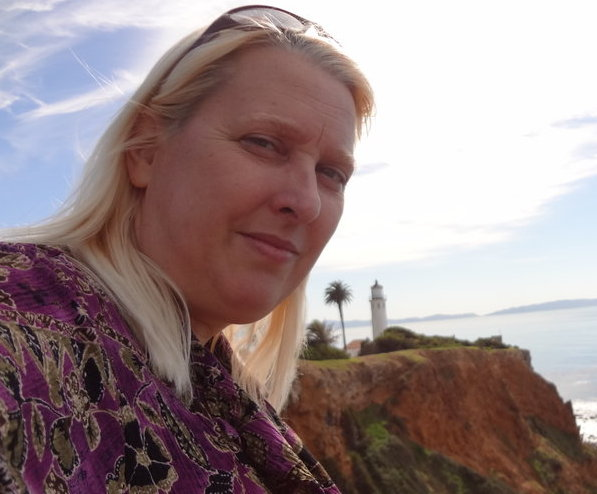
- Born: January 29, 1971 (age 55); Albert Lea, Minnesota, United States
- Occupation: Writer

Jodi Jill (born January 29, 1971) is an American author best known for having been raised in a public storage facility.

== Early life ==
Jill was born in Albert Lea, Minnesota. In 1980, when she was nine years old, she, her parents, and her younger sister relocated to Loveland, Colorado, where the family moved into a 10-by-20-foot storage unit at Loveland Self Storage. Because the facility forbade living in the units, Jill's parents set strict rules for the children: they were not allowed out of the unit during the day, to attend school, or to interact with people outside the family. Neither Jill nor her siblings were ever enrolled in school.

The storage unit would remain Jill and her family's residence for the next 13 years, during which time her parents had three more children.

A feature article about Jill in Marie Claire described the family's "bizarre" living arrangement:

With wood pilfered from construction sites, (Jill's father) built a sleeping loft. For a toilet, everyone used the same bucket, emptied only once a day in a nearby ditch; to bathe, they filled another bucket from a spigot in the parking lot. A propane heater kept the temperature just above freezing.

== Writing career ==
Jill is the author of Tours for Free California and Tours for Free: Colorado. In 2004, Los Angeles Magazine called Tours for Free California the year's "Best Offbeat Guide to L.A."
