= Albert Lea, Minnesota =

City in Minnesota, United States

- City
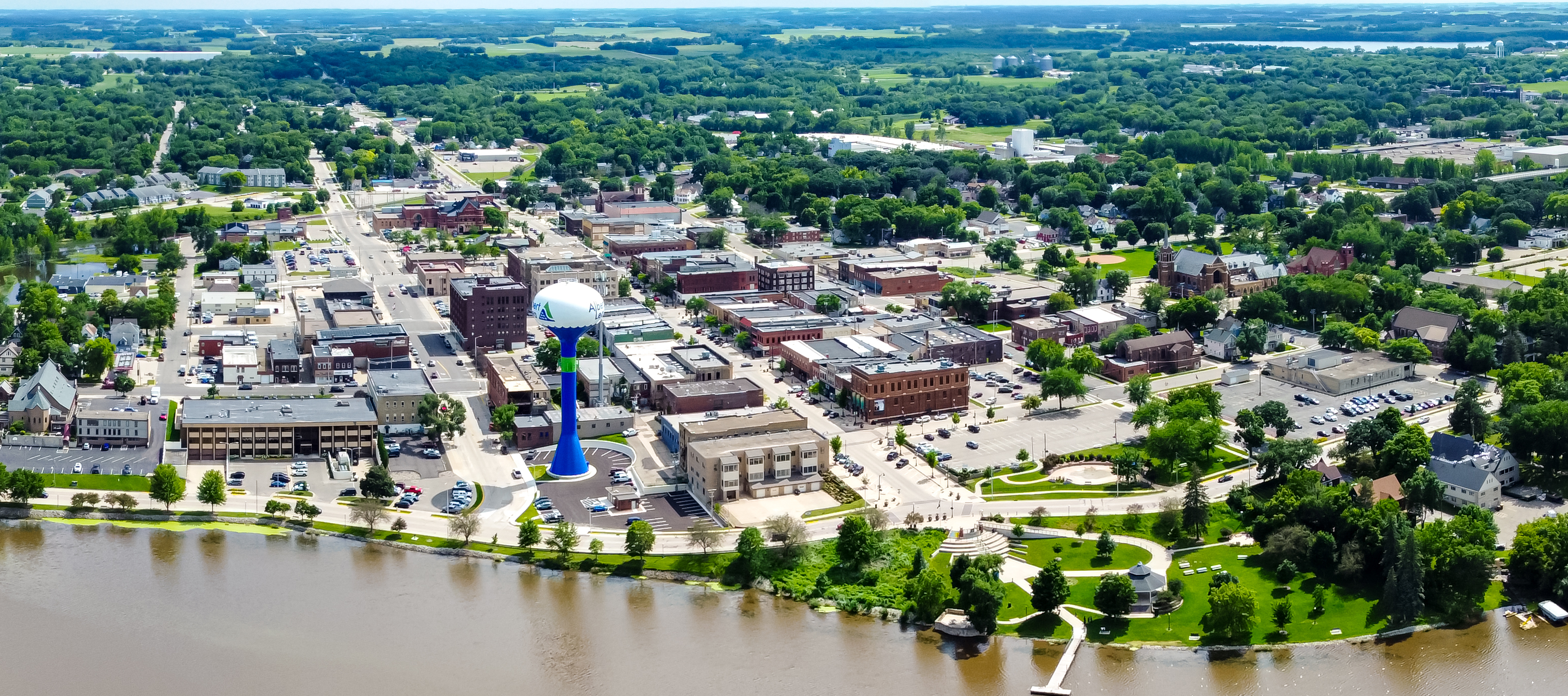
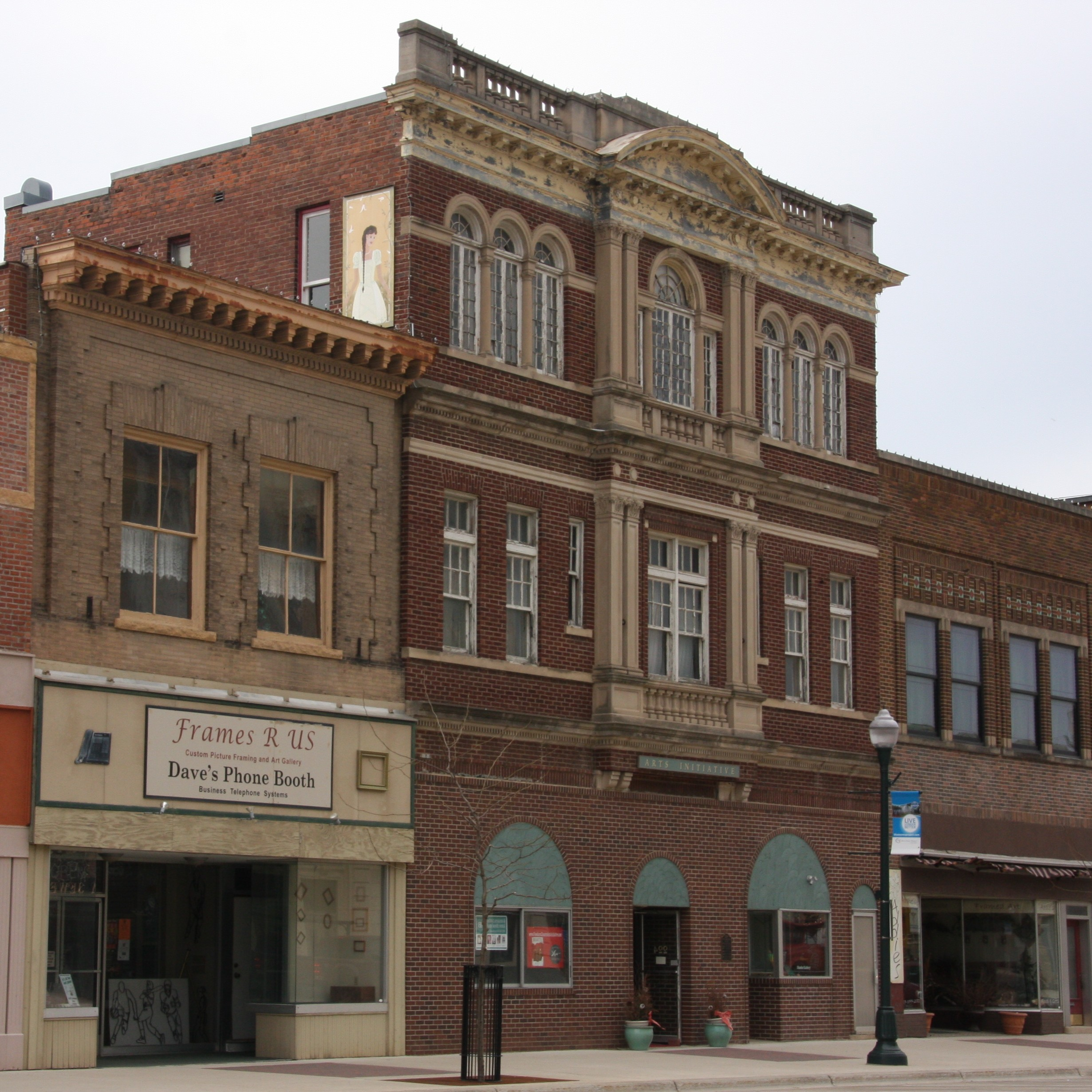
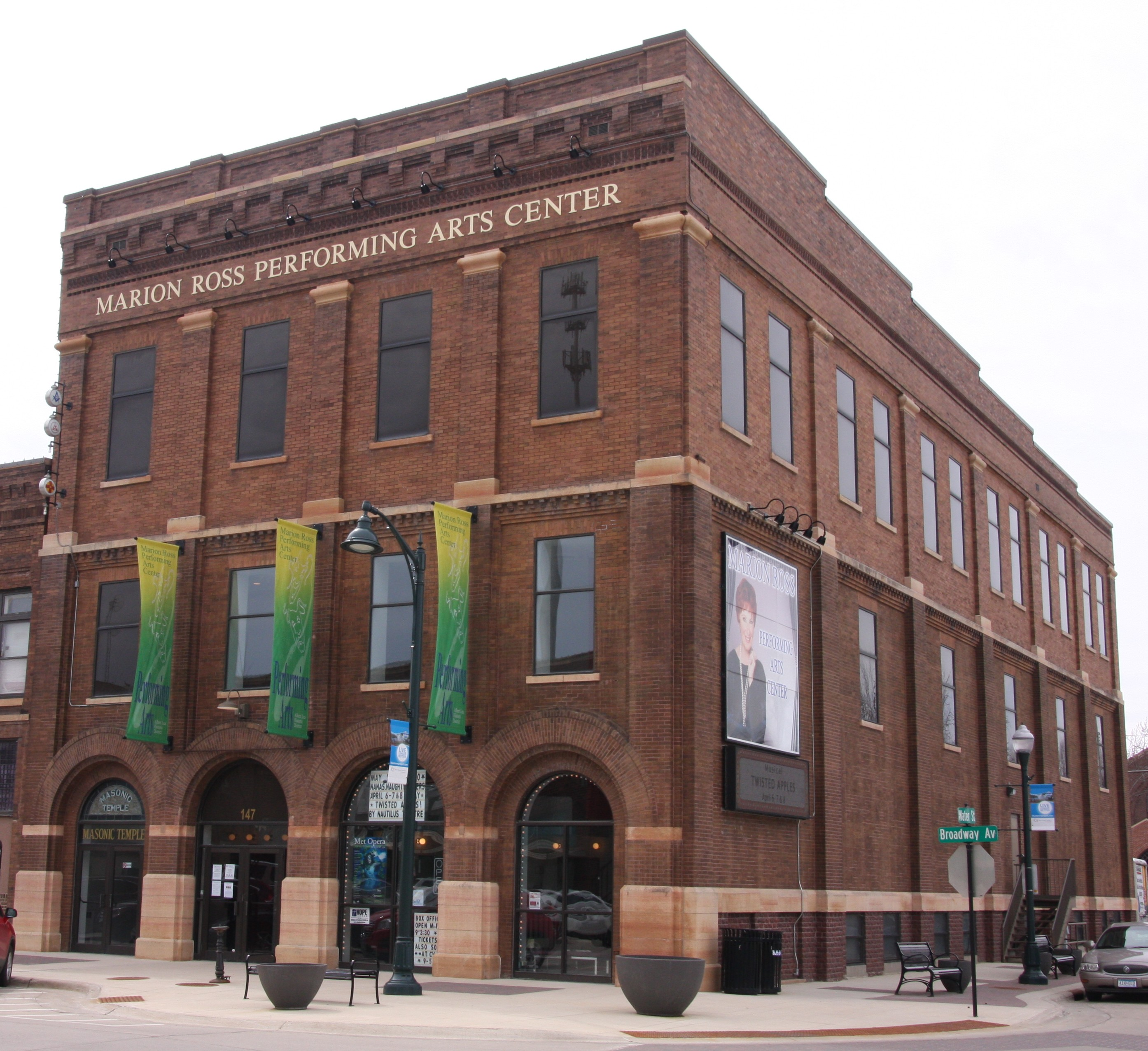
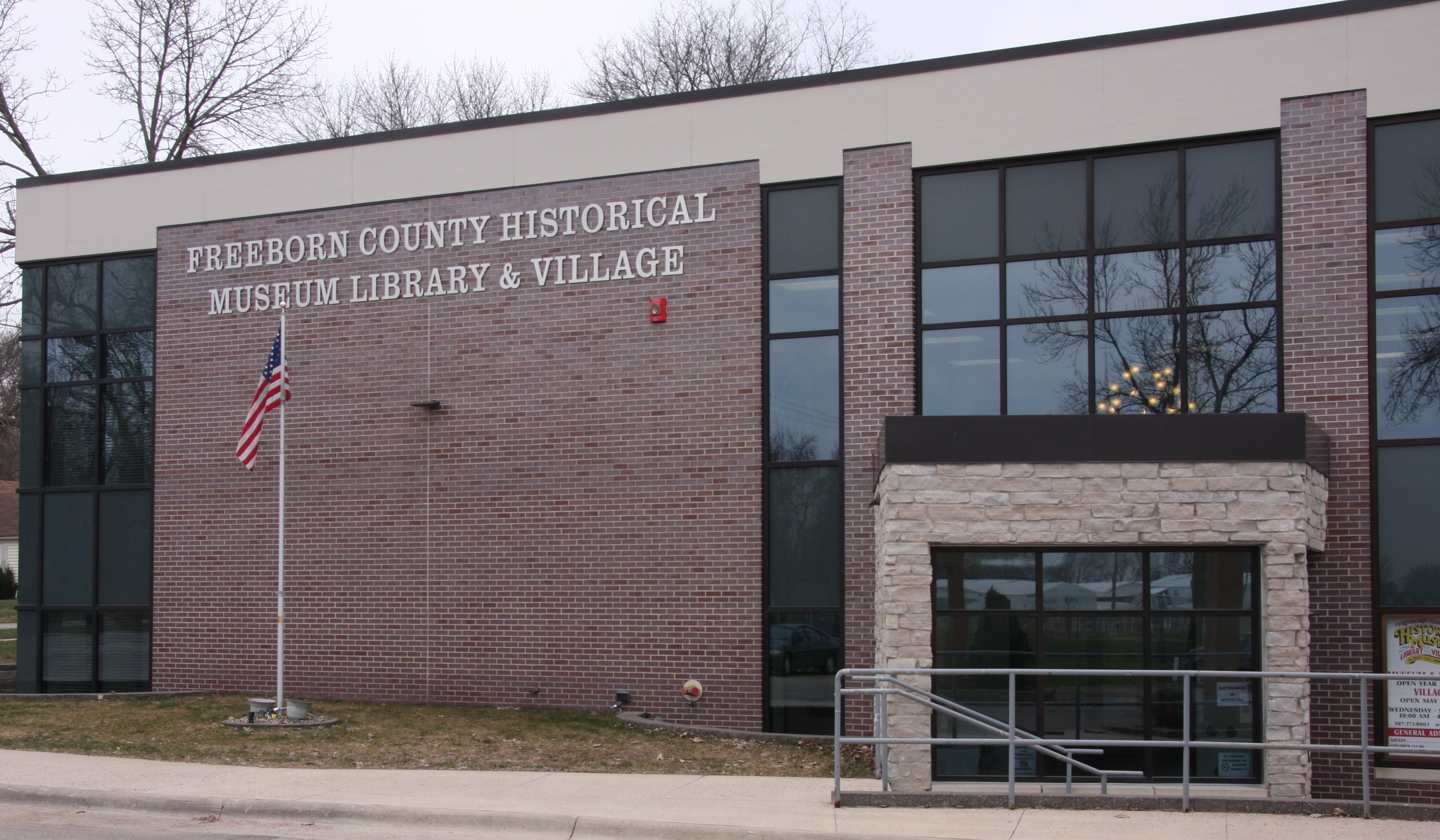
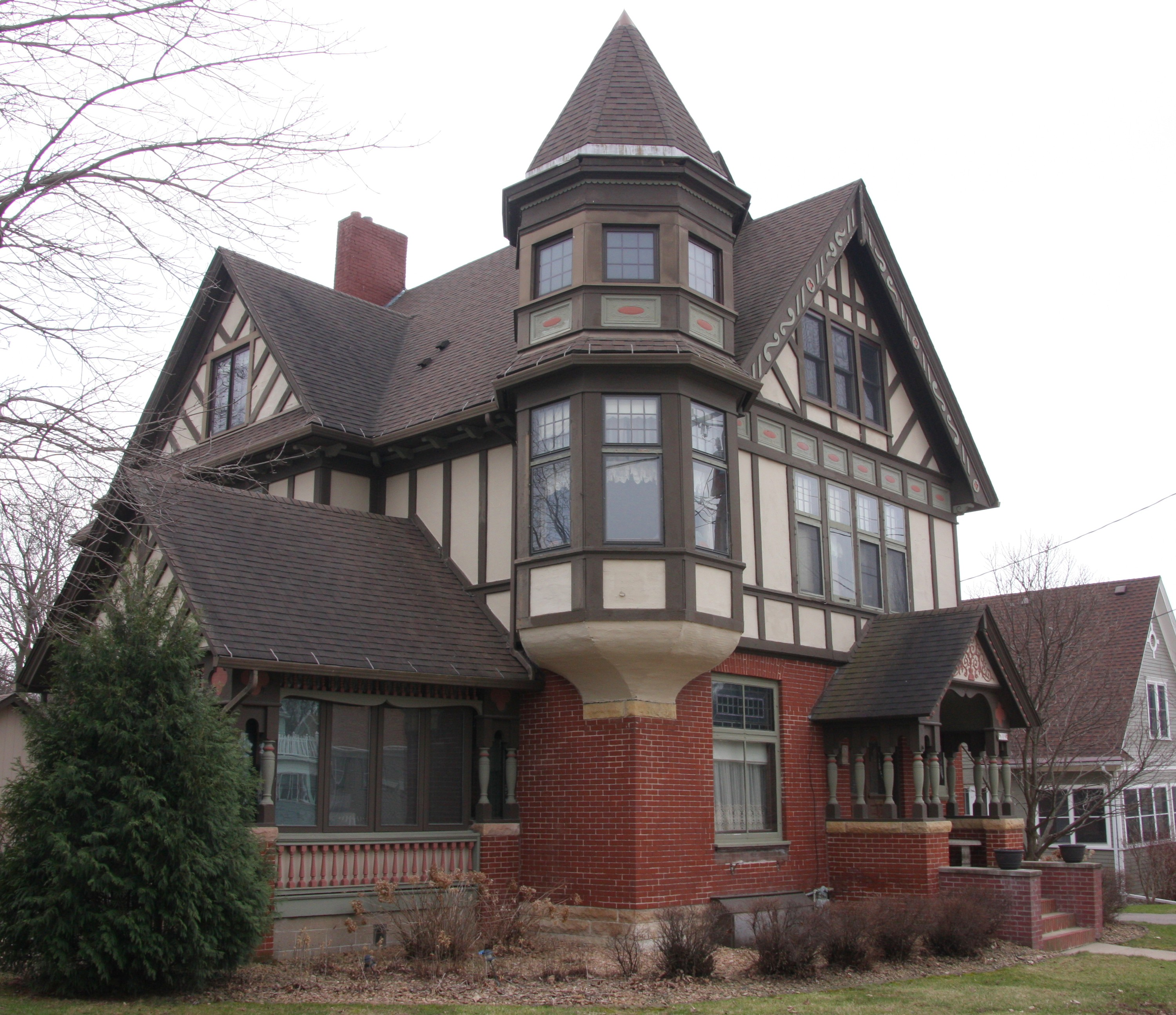
- Downtown Albert Lea Beatrice Bessesen Building Marion Ross Performing Arts Center Freeborn County Museum H. A. Paine House

- Logo
- Motto: Land Between the Lakes
- Location of the city of Albert Lea within Freeborn County in the state of Minnesota
- Coordinates: 43°39′18″N 93°21′51″W
- Country: United States
- State: Minnesota
- County: Freeborn
- Founded: 1855
- Incorporated (village): 1859
- Incorporated (city): 1878

Government
  - Mayor: Rich Murray
  - City Manager: Ian Rigg
  - Police Chief: Darren Hanson
  - Fire Chief: Jeff Laskowske

Area
  - City: 15.14 sq mi (39.21 km^{2})
  - Land: 13.29 sq mi (34.42 km^{2})
  - Water: 1.85 sq mi (4.79 km^{2}) 12.69%
- Elevation: 1,250 ft (380 m)

Population (2020)
  - City: 18,492
  - Estimate (2023): 18,269
  - Density: 1,391.5/sq mi (537.27/km^{2})
  - Urban: 17,992
  - Metro: 30,718 (US: 428th)
- Demonym: Albert Leans
- Time zone: UTC-6 (CST)
  - Summer (DST): UTC-5 (CDT)
- ZIP Code: 56007
- Area code: 507
- FIPS code: 27-00694
- GNIS feature ID: 2393902
- Website: cityofalbertlea.org

Albert Lea (/ˌælbərt ˈliː/ AL-bərt LEE) is a city in Freeborn County, in southern Minnesota. It is the county seat. Its population was 18,492 at the 2020 census. The city is at the junction of Interstates 35 and 90, about 90 miles (140 km) south of the Twin Cities. It is on the shores of Fountain Lake, Pickerel Lake, Albert Lea Lake, Goose Lake, School Lake, and Lake Chapeau. Fountain Lake and Albert Lea Lake are part of the Shell Rock River flowage.

The city's early growth was based on agriculture, farming support services and manufacturing, and it was a significant rail center. At one time it was the site of Cargill's headquarters. Other manufacturing included Edwards Manufacturing (barn equipment), Scotsman Ice Machines, Streater Store fixtures, and Universal Milking Machines. As in many U.S. cities, Albert Lea's manufacturing base has substantially diminished. A major employer was the Wilson & Company meatpacking plant, later known as Farmstead and Farmland. This facility was destroyed by fire in July 2001.

== History ==
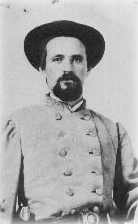
Albert Lea, c. 1862

The city is named after Albert Lea Lake, which was named after Albert Miller Lea, a topographer from Tennessee with the United States Dragoons, who surveyed southern Minnesota and northern Iowa in 1835, including the current site of Albert Lea. Captain Nathan Boone, a son of Daniel Boone, was the scout for Lea's Dragoon unit. Lea later served the Southern rebellion as an engineering officer in the Confederate States Army during the American Civil War.

== Geography ==
According to the United States Census Bureau, the city has an area of 14.42 square miles (37.35 km^{2}), of which 12.59 square miles (32.61 km^{2}) is land and 1.83 square miles (4.74 km^{2}) is water. Myre-Big Island State Park is nearby. There are three main lakes in Albert Lea: Fountain Lake, Pickerel Lake and Albert Lea Lake.

=== Climate ===
Albert Lea has a humid continental climate of the hot-summer subtype (Köppen Dfa). Albert Lea varies from cold winters to hot summers, with significant contrasts between seasons. Its climate type is typical for inland northern United States locations, but due to its southern position in the state, its summers and winters have higher temperatures than other, more northerly regions of the state. An exception to this rule is the urban core of Minneapolis - St. Paul, which sees higher temperatures typical of an urban heat island, but Albert Lea is significantly warmer than locations such as Duluth.

Climate data for Albert Lea, Minnesota (1991–2020 normals, extremes 1885–present)
Month	Jan	Feb	Mar	Apr	May	Jun	Jul	Aug	Sep	Oct	Nov	Dec	Year
Record high °F (°C)	64 (18)	64 (18)	84 (29)	94 (34)	104 (40)	104 (40)	104 (40)	101 (38)	103 (39)	94 (34)	79 (26)	67 (19)	104 (40)
Mean maximum °F (°C)	42.1 (5.6)	46.3 (7.9)	64.7 (18.2)	79.7 (26.5)	88.1 (31.2)	92.2 (33.4)	91.8 (33.2)	89.5 (31.9)	87.9 (31.1)	81.8 (27.7)	64.8 (18.2)	46.6 (8.1)	94.5 (34.7)
Mean daily maximum °F (°C)	22.5 (−5.3)	27.1 (−2.7)	39.6 (4.2)	55.1 (12.8)	68.0 (20.0)	78.3 (25.7)	81.6 (27.6)	79.2 (26.2)	73.0 (22.8)	58.9 (14.9)	42.1 (5.6)	28.3 (−2.1)	54.5 (12.5)
Daily mean °F (°C)	14.2 (−9.9)	18.5 (−7.5)	31.2 (−0.4)	45.3 (7.4)	58.1 (14.5)	68.7 (20.4)	72.0 (22.2)	69.6 (20.9)	62.0 (16.7)	48.3 (9.1)	33.7 (0.9)	20.9 (−6.2)	45.2 (7.3)
Mean daily minimum °F (°C)	5.9 (−14.5)	9.8 (−12.3)	22.8 (−5.1)	35.5 (1.9)	48.1 (8.9)	59.0 (15.0)	62.5 (16.9)	59.9 (15.5)	51.1 (10.6)	37.7 (3.2)	25.3 (−3.7)	13.4 (−10.3)	35.9 (2.2)
Mean minimum °F (°C)	−16.2 (−26.8)	−11.1 (−23.9)	−0.2 (−17.9)	20.9 (−6.2)	33.8 (1.0)	46.2 (7.9)	52.2 (11.2)	49.1 (9.5)	35.9 (2.2)	22.6 (−5.2)	7.3 (−13.7)	−8.7 (−22.6)	−18.8 (−28.2)
Record low °F (°C)	−41 (−41)	−33 (−36)	−29 (−34)	3 (−16)	21 (−6)	34 (1)	42 (6)	35 (2)	22 (−6)	−6 (−21)	−18 (−28)	−29 (−34)	−41 (−41)
Average precipitation inches (mm)	0.89 (23)	0.87 (22)	1.94 (49)	3.74 (95)	4.85 (123)	5.44 (138)	4.81 (122)	4.27 (108)	3.71 (94)	2.58 (66)	1.54 (39)	1.13 (29)	35.77 (909)
Average snowfall inches (cm)	8.9 (23)	9.8 (25)	6.6 (17)	2.8 (7.1)	0.3 (0.76)	0.0 (0.0)	0.0 (0.0)	0.0 (0.0)	0.0 (0.0)	0.3 (0.76)	2.7 (6.9)	8.1 (21)	39.5 (100)
Average precipitation days (≥ 0.01 in)	6.9	6.1	7.9	11.0	12.9	12.4	10.7	10.3	9.1	9.5	6.8	7.2	110.8
Average snowy days (≥ 0.1 in)	6.1	5.1	3.3	1.1	0.1	0.0	0.0	0.0	0.0	0.2	1.9	5.0	22.8
Source: NOAA

== Demographics ==
Historical population
Census	Pop.	Note	%±
1860	262		—
1880	1,966		—
1890	3,305		68.1%
1900	4,500		36.2%
1910	6,192		37.6%
1920	8,056		30.1%
1930	10,169		26.2%
1940	12,200		20.0%
1950	13,545		11.0%
1960	17,108		26.3%
1970	19,418		13.5%
1980	19,200		−1.1%
1990	18,310		−4.6%
2000	18,356		0.3%
2010	18,016		−1.9%
2020	18,492		2.6%
2023 (est.)	18,269		−1.2%
U.S. Decennial Census; 2020 Census

=== 2020 census ===
As of the 2020 census, Albert Lea had a population of 18,492. The median age was 42.3 years. 22.6% of residents were under the age of 18 and 23.8% of residents were 65 years of age or older. For every 100 females there were 95.4 males, and for every 100 females age 18 and over there were 91.4 males age 18 and over.

97.0% of residents lived in urban areas, while 3.0% lived in rural areas.

There were 7,951 households in Albert Lea, of which 25.5% had children under the age of 18 living in them. Of all households, 40.3% were married-couple households, 19.7% were households with a male householder and no spouse or partner present, and 30.6% were households with a female householder and no spouse or partner present. About 36.2% of all households were made up of individuals and 17.9% had someone living alone who was 65 years of age or older.

There were 8,574 housing units, of which 7.3% were vacant. The homeowner vacancy rate was 1.7% and the rental vacancy rate was 7.1%.

Racial composition as of the 2020 census
Race	Number	Percent
White	14,504	78.4%
Black or African American	430	2.3%
American Indian and Alaska Native	111	0.6%
Asian	987	5.3%
Native Hawaiian and Other Pacific Islander	3	0.0%
Some other race	1,086	5.9%
Two or more races	1,371	7.4%
Hispanic or Latino (of any race)	2,719	14.7%

=== 2010 census ===
As of the census of 2010, there were 18,016 people, 7,774 households, and 4,644 families living in the city. The population density was 1,431.0 inhabitants per square mile (552.5/km^{2}). There were 8,410 housing units at an average density of 668.0 per square mile (257.9/km^{2}). The racial makeup of the city was 90.0% White, 1.1% African American, 0.3% Native American, 1.1% Asian, 0.1% Pacific Islander, 5.3% from other races, and 2.1% from two or more races. Hispanic or Latino of any race were 13.2% of the population.

There were 7,774 households, of which 25.6% had children under the age of 18 living with them, 45.0% were married couples living together, 10.4% had a female householder with no husband present, 4.4% had a male householder with no wife present, and 40.3% were non-families. 34.9% of all households were made up of individuals, and 17.3% had someone living alone who was 65 years of age or older. The average household size was 2.24 and the average family size was 2.85.

The median age in the city was 44 years. 21.5% of residents were under the age of 18; 7.9% were between the ages of 18 and 24; 22% were from 25 to 44; 26.3% were from 45 to 64; and 22.4% were 65 years of age or older. The gender makeup of the city was 48.3% male and 51.7% female.

=== 2000 census ===
As of the census of 2000, there were 18,356 people, 7,785 households, and 4,826 families living in the city. The population density was 1,702.5 inhabitants per square mile (657.3/km^{2}). There were 8,133 housing units at an average density of 754.3 per square mile (291.2/km^{2}). The racial makeup of the city was 92.80% White, 0.37% African American, 0.29% Native American, 0.80% Asian, 0.03% Pacific Islander, 4.54% from other races, and 1.18% from two or more races. 9.48% of the population were Hispanic or Latino of any race.

Of the 7,785 households, 26.9% had children under the age of 18 living with them, 49.5% were married couples living together, 9.1% had a female householder with no husband present, and 38.0% were non-families. 33.0% of all households were made up of individuals, and 16.8% had someone living alone who was 65 years of age or older. The average household size was 2.28 and the average family size was 2.88.

23.0% of Albert Lea's population were under the age of 18, 7.9% were 18 to 24, 24.6% were 25 to 44, 23.2% were from 45 to 64, and 21.3% were 65 years of age or older. The median age was 41 years. For every 100 females, there were 90.2 males. For every 100 females age 18 and over, there were 87.6 males.

The median income for a household in the city was $32,841, and the median income for a family was $42,407. Males had a median income of $31,383 versus $21,114 for females. The per capita income for the city was $17,979. 10.2% of the population and 6.9% of families were below the poverty line. 10.6% of those under the age of 18 and 10.9% of those 65 and older were living below the poverty line.

== Arts and culture ==
The Marion Ross Performing Arts Center is a historic building in downtown Albert Lea. The 255-seat theater is used for the arts, business meetings, and seminars.

The Freeborn County Fair takes place annually in Albert Lea, and includes live entertainment, an antique tractor show, a draft horse show, a small and baby animal show, a midway featuring rides, concessions, and other attractions, and a Sunday church service. A number of well-known and popular Country and Western bands have appeared at the Fair, including Kelly Pickler, Jason Aldean, the Oak Ridge Boys, the Statler Brothers, among many others.

The Albert Lea Art Center hosts public events.

== Parks and recreation ==
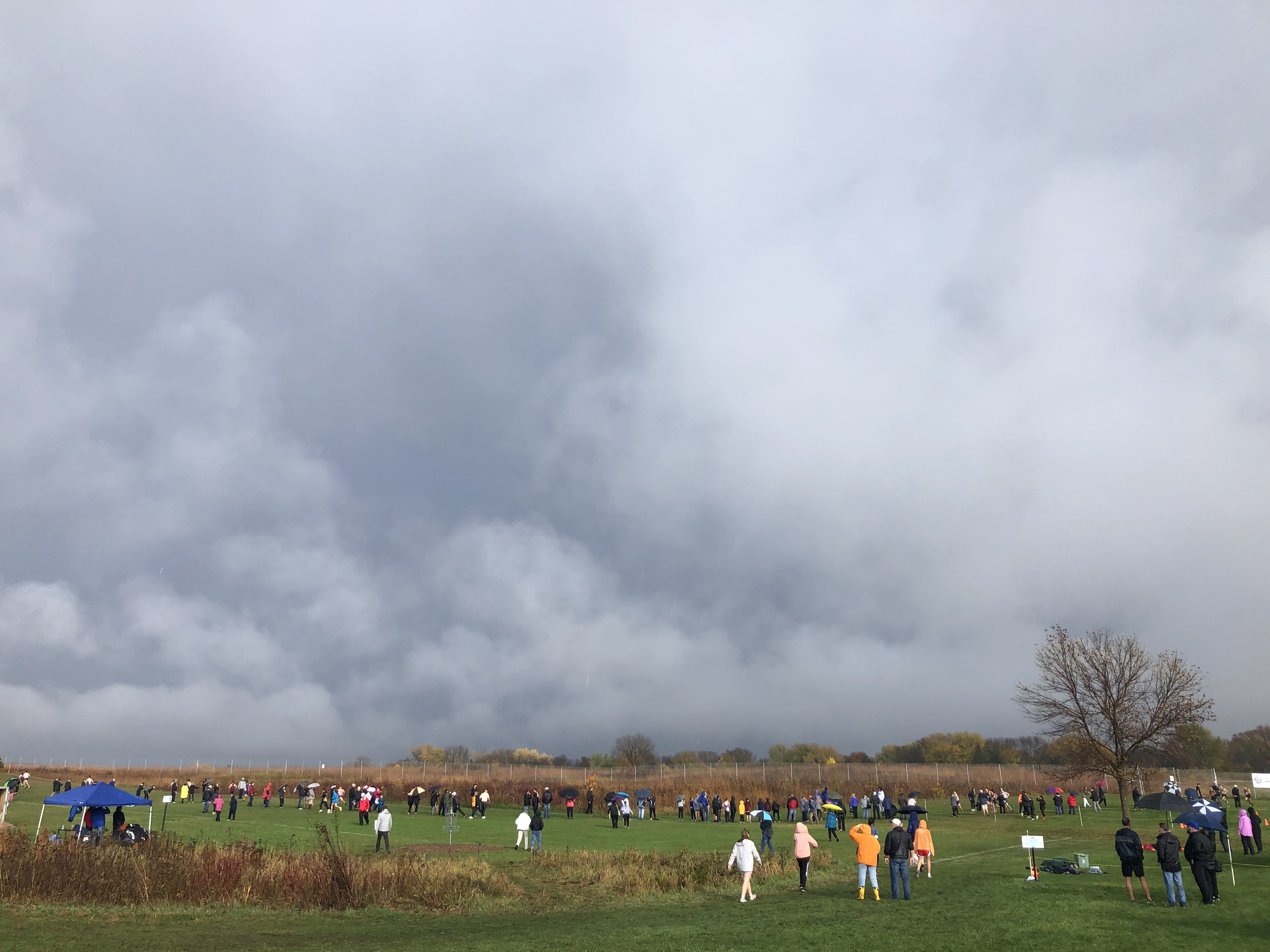
Bancroft Bay Park during a cross country meet

Albert Lea maintains multiple park sites.

The Blazing Star State Trail is an eight-mile bike path from Frank Hall Park through Myre-Big Island State Park to Hayward, Minnesota. The trail runs through wetlands, oak savanna, big woods, and prairie environments. When complete, it will run to Austin, Minnesota and connect to the Shooting Star State Trail.

Bancroft Bay Park encompasses wooded trails, views of Fountain Lake, and a disc golf course. The city bought the land from a mink farm in 1972, and the park opened in 1976.

Albert Lea's Blue Zones Walkway was established after Dan Buettner launched a pilot project to make Albert Lea a blue zone in 2009. The walkway passes Brookside Park, City Beach, City Hall, Lakeview Park, and Pioneer Park.

== Sports ==
The Albert Lea Thunder was a junior hockey team that played at Albert Lea Ice Arena and was a member of the North American Hockey League. The team operated for two seasons in 2008–10 and folded due to financial difficulties. On May 11, 2010, it was reported that the team had found new owners and would relocate to Texas for the 2010–11 season. Its roster was sold to the expansion Amarillo, Texas, franchise the Amarillo Bulls on May 26, 2010.

== Government ==
Albert Lea's city hall is at 221 East Clark St. Albert Lea is in Minnesota's 1st congressional district, represented by Brad Finstad, a Republican from New Ulm. It is in Minnesota State Senate District 23, represented by State Senator Gene Dornink, a Republican from Brownsdale, and in Minnesota's House District 23A, represented by Peggy Bennett, a Republican.

Presidential election results

Precinct General Election Results
Year	Republican	Democratic	Third parties
2020	51.4% 4,742	46.5% 4,296	2.1% 192
2016	49.8% 4,316	42.2% 3,657	8.0% 692
2012	39.0% 3,523	58.8% 5,303	2.2% 202
2008	37.9% 3,522	59.8% 5,562	2.3% 211
2004	40.9% 2,801	57.8% 5,377	1.4% 126
2000	39.3% 3,381	55.2% 4,749	5.5% 479
1996	30.6% 2,576	56.7% 4,772	12.7% 1,072
1992	29.0% 2,727	47.5% 4,463	23.5% 2,201
1988	43.7% 3,608	56.3% 4,654	0.0% 0
1984	45.1% 4,158	54.9% 5,060	0.0% 0
1980	45.3% 4,048	49.1% 4,392	5.6% 503
1976	46.9% 4,255	51.9% 4,711	1.2% 110
1972	56.2% 4,825	42.8% 3,679	1.0% 82
1968	42.5% 3,374	54.7% 4,344	2.8% 226
1964	37.0% 2,969	62.9% 5,048	0.1% 14
1960	54.2% 4,231	45.7% 3,563	0.1% 11

== Education ==
Albert Lea High School
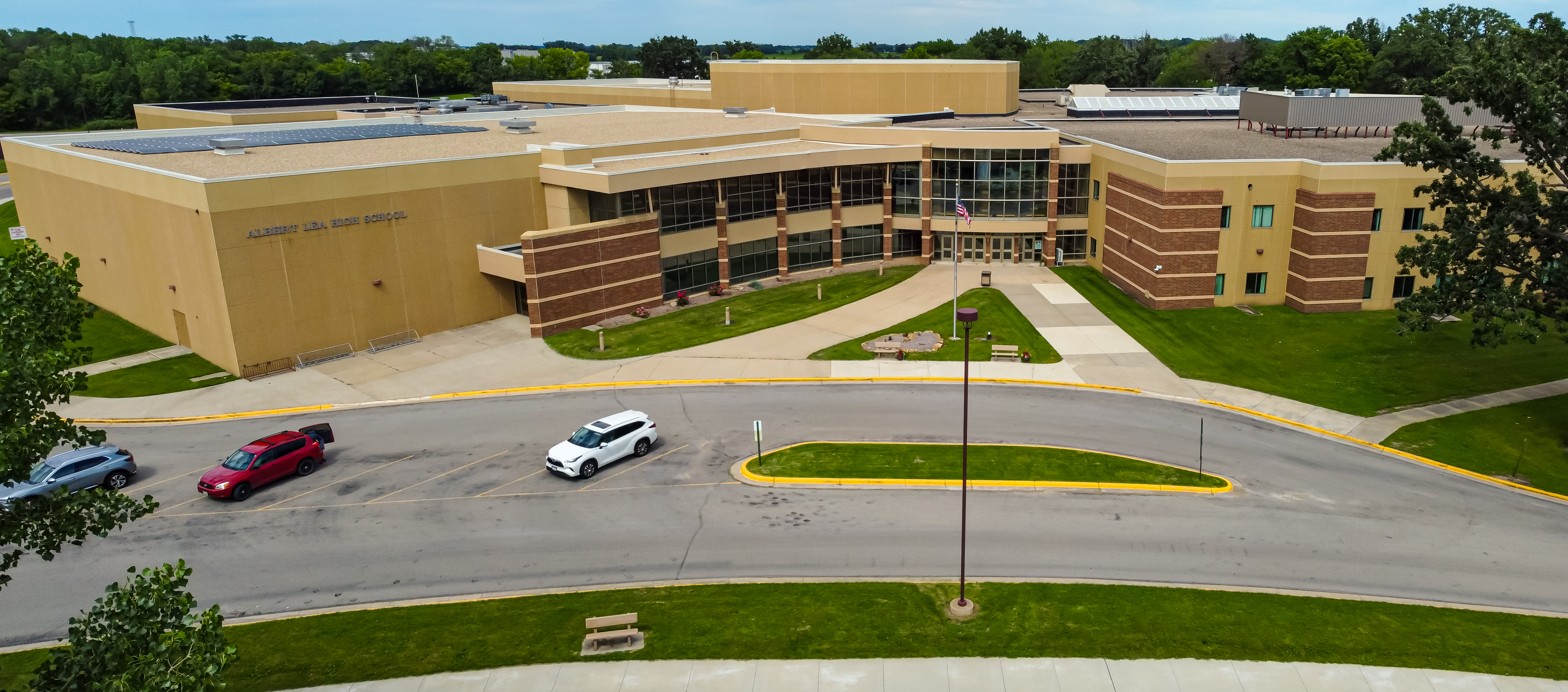
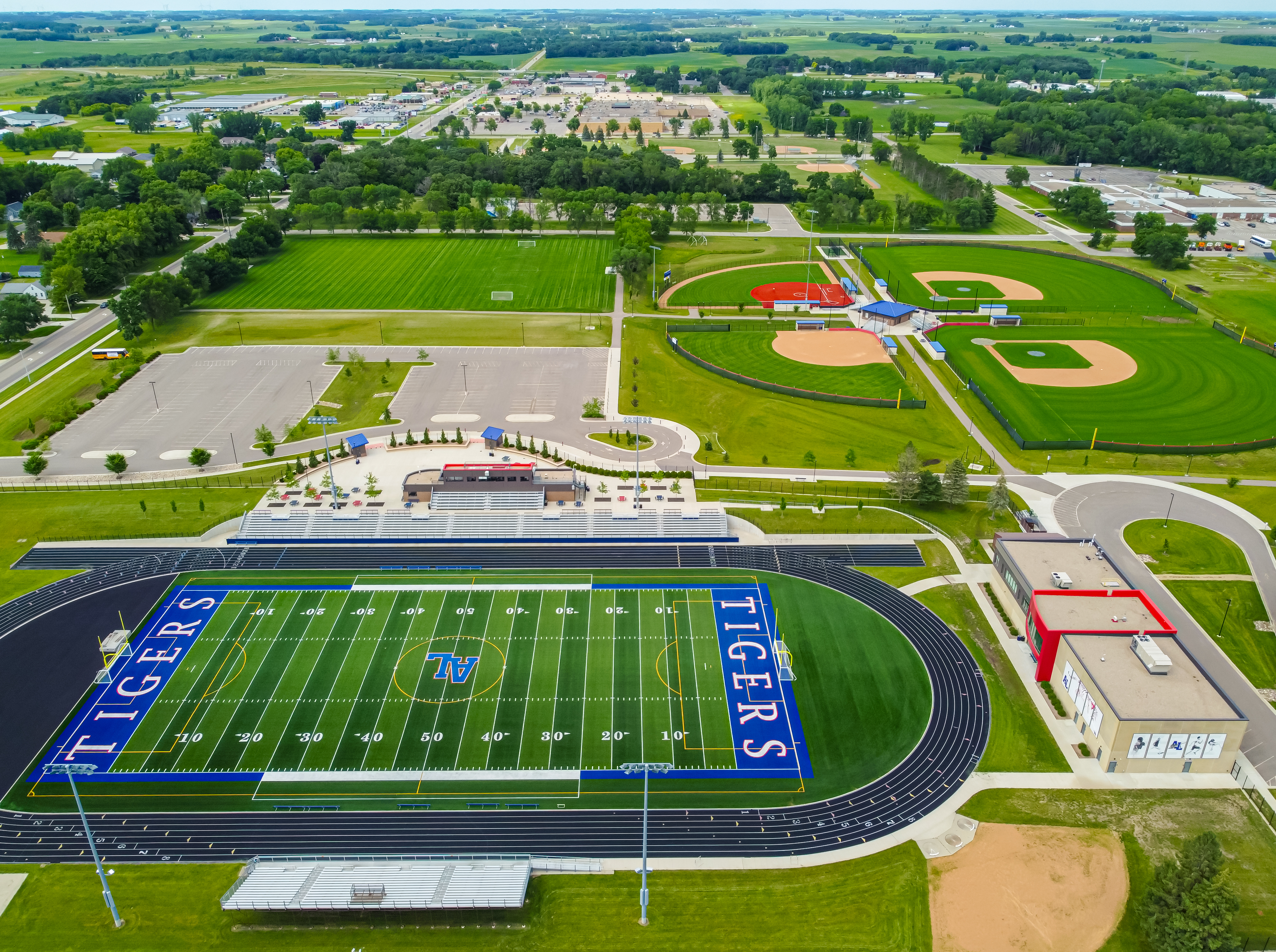
- School District 241
  - Alternative Learning Center
- Elementary schools
  - Halverson Elementary
  - Hawthorne Elementary
  - Lakeview Elementary
  - Sibley Elementary
  - St. Theodore's Catholic School
- Middle schools
  - Southwest Middle School
- High school
  - Albert Lea High School
- Higher education
  - Riverland Community College
  - Lea College, operated 1966–1973
- Community education
  - Albert Lea Community Ed

== Media ==
The Albert Lea Tribune, founded in 1897, is a newspaper published Monday through Saturday in Albert Lea. It is owned by Boone Newspapers.

Radio stations with Albert Lea as the city of license include:

- KATE an AM radio station broadcasting at 1450 kHz. The station airs news/talk programming and is owned by Alpha Media.
- KCPI "94.9 The Breeze" an FM radio station broadcasting at 94.9 MHz. The station airs an adult contemporary music programming and is owned by Alpha Media.
- KQPR "Power 96" an FM radio station broadcasting at 96.1 MHz. The station airs classic rock music programming and is owned by D&Z Media LLC.

== Transportation ==
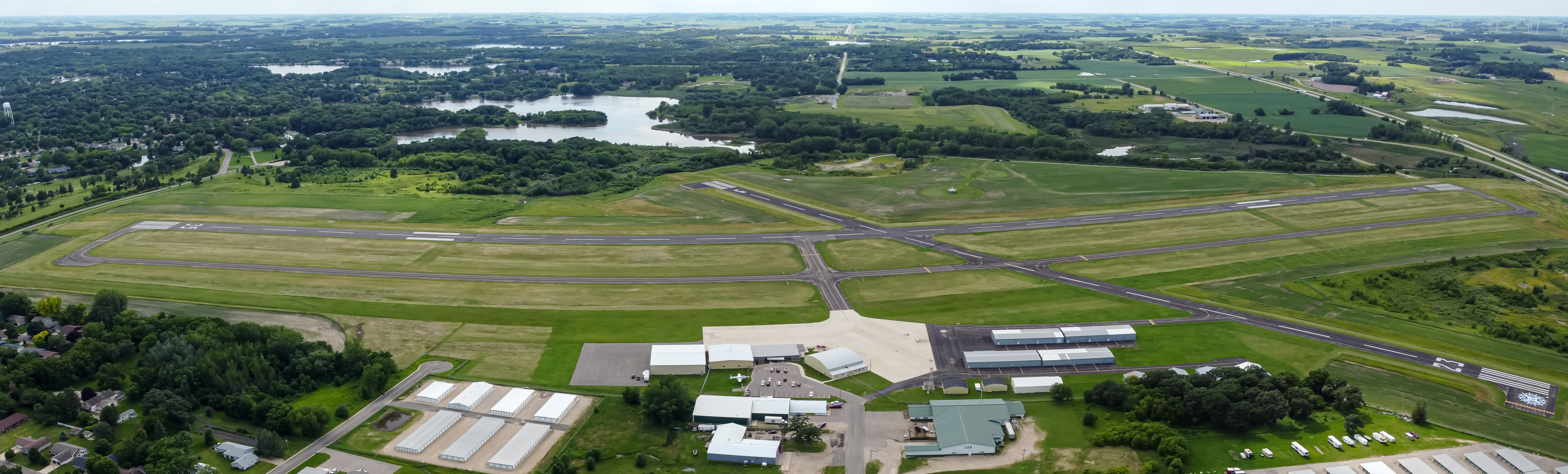
Albert Lea Municipal Airport

Local bus service in Albert Lea is provided by SMART. SMART operates one deviated fixed route and paratransit service.

== Notable people ==
- Clare Hibbs Armstrong, brigadier general during World War II
- Alfred Berglund, Minnesota state senator and farmer
- Beatrice Gjertsen Bessesen (1886–1935), operatic soprano and namesake of the Bessesen Building
- Tom Brown (Canadian football), Minnesota Golden Gophers and BC Lions football star
- Richard Carlson, sci-fi and horror writer, director and actor
- Vinny Cerrato, former Washington Redskins general manager
- Eddie Cochran, rockabilly musician
- Robert Crumb, cartoonist and musician
- Richard Fitzgerald, farmer, businessman, and Minnesota state legislator
- Al Franken, comedian, commentator and U.S. Senator
- Joan Claire Graham, writer, editor and publisher
- Alexander Grinager, an artist most noted for his murals, born in Albert Lea
- Rudolph Hanson, lawyer and Minnesota state legislator
- Steve Heitzeg, composer, born in Albert Lea
- Mary Kelly, conceptual artist
- Jodi Jill, author, also known for having been raised as a child in a public storage facility
- John A. Lovely, Minnesota Supreme Court justice
- Paul Overgaard, businessman and Minnesota state legislator
- Tim Penny, U.S. Representative (1983–1995), born in Albert Lea
- Mark Piepho, businessman and Minnesota state legislator
- Marion Ross, actress (Happy Days)
- Olive Nelson Russell, composer, organist, and pianist
- Perry Saturn, professional wrestler
- William B. Sieglaff, double Navy Cross recipient and US Navy Admiral
- Warren Stowell, teacher, businessman, and Minnesota state legislator
- Ben Woodside, Professional Basketball Player

== See also ==
- 2010 Conger–Albert Lea tornado
- Albert Lea Municipal Airport
- Albert Lea Public Library
- AARP/Blue Zones Vitality Project
