= KATE =

Radio station in Albert Lea, Minnesota

- Albert Lea, Minnesota; United States
- Broadcast area: Austin
- Frequency: 1450 kHz
- Branding: 1450 AM KATE

Programming
- Format: News/talk; soft oldies
- Affiliations: ABC News Radio; Minnesota Lynx; Minnesota Timberwolves; Minnesota Twins; Minnesota Wild

Ownership
- Owner: Connoisseur Media; (Alpha 3E Licensee LLC)
- Sister stations: KAUS, KCPI

History
- First air date: October 12, 1937
- Call sign meaning: Albert Lea

Technical information
- Licensing authority: FCC
- Facility ID: 12670
- Class: C
- Power: 1,000 watts unlimited
- Transmitter coordinates: 43°38′00″N 93°22′15″W

Links
- Public license information: Public file; LMS
- Webcast: Listen live
- Website: www.myalbertlea.com

KATE (1450 AM) is a radio station broadcasting a news/talk and oldies format. Licensed to Albert Lea, Minnesota, United States, the station serves the Albert Lea–Austin area. It is owned by Connoisseur Media, through licensee Alpha 3E Licensee LLC.

== History ==
KATE officially commenced broadcasting on October 12, 1937. The station's launch was a major local event, preceded by a significant announcement in the Albert Lea Evening Tribune on October 11, which detailed the station's intent to serve as a primary news and entertainment source for the region.

Throughout the mid-20th century, KATE functioned as a full-service station, providing local agricultural reports, news, and community programming. It was a long-time affiliate of the ABC Radio Network. KATE has seen several ownership changes, reflecting the broader trends of consolidation in Midwestern broadcasting. For many years, the station was locally owned by the Albert Lea Broadcasting Co. In the late 20th century, it was acquired by David Nolander, who operated the station alongside KCPI-FM.

In May 1999, the Federal Communications Commission (FCC) approved the sale of KATE and KCPI from Nolander to Three Eagles Broadcasting. Three Eagles operated the station for over a decade before selling its Minnesota and Iowa clusters to Digity, LLC in 2014, which was subsequently acquired by Alpha Media in 2016.

Previous logo

Most recently, in May 2025, Alpha Media reached an agreement to sell its Upper Midwest stations, including KATE, to Connoisseur Media. The transaction involved a local marketing agreement (LMA) allowing Connoisseur to manage the station's operations immediately while awaiting final FCC approval.
