= List of television stations in Wisconsin =

This is a list of broadcast television stations that are licensed in the U.S. state of Wisconsin.

== Full-power ==
- Stations are arranged by media market served and channel position.

Full-power television stations in Wisconsin
Media market	Station	Channel	Primary affiliation(s)	Notes	Refs
Eau Claire–La Crosse	WKBT-DT	8	CBS, MyNetworkTV on 8.2	(Note: Licensed to La Crosse.)	
Eau Claire–La Crosse	WEAU	13	NBC, The CW on 14.10		
Eau Claire–La Crosse	WQOW	18	ABC		
Eau Claire–La Crosse	WXOW	19	ABC		
Eau Claire–La Crosse	WLAX	25	Fox		
Eau Claire–La Crosse	WHWC-TV	28	PBS	(Note: Licensed to Menomonie.) (Note: Satellite of WHA-TV.)	
Eau Claire–La Crosse	WHLA-TV	31	PBS		
Eau Claire–La Crosse	WEUX	48	Fox	(Note: Licensed to Chippewa Falls.) (Note: Satellite of WLAX.)	
Green Bay	WBAY-TV	2	ABC, The365/MyNetworkTV on 2.3		
Green Bay	WFRV-TV	5	CBS		
Green Bay	WLUK-TV	11	Fox		
Green Bay	WCWF	14	The CW	(Note: Licensed to Suring.)	
Green Bay	WGBA-TV	26	NBC		
Green Bay	WMEI	31	MeTV	(Note: Licensed to Shawano.)	
Green Bay	WACY-TV	32	Independent	(Note: Licensed to Appleton.)	
Green Bay	WPNE-TV	38	PBS		
Madison	WISC-TV	3	CBS, MyNetworkTV on 3.2		
Madison	WMTV	15	NBC, The CW on 15.2		
Madison	WHA-TV	21	PBS		
Madison	WKOW	27	ABC		
Madison	WMSN-TV	47	Fox		
Madison	WIFS	57	Ion Television	(Note: Licensed to Janesville.)	
Milwaukee	WTMJ-TV	4	NBC		
Milwaukee	WITI	6	Fox		
Milwaukee	WMVS	10	PBS		
Milwaukee	WISN-TV	12	ABC		
Milwaukee	WVTV	18, 24	The CW, MyNetworkTV	(Note: 24.1 carries MyNetworkTV.) (Note: 24.1 was formerly its own license as WCGV-TV.)	
Milwaukee	WVCY-TV	30	Religious independent		
Milwaukee	WMVT	36	PBS		
Milwaukee	WMLW-TV	49	Independent	(Note: Licensed to Racine.)	
Milwaukee	WWRS-TV	52	TBN	(Note: Licensed to Mayville.)	
Milwaukee	WPXE-TV	55	Ion Television	(Note: Licensed to Kenosha.)	
Milwaukee	WDJT-TV	58	CBS, Independent on 58.3, Telemundo on 58.4		
Milwaukee	WIWN	68	Cozi TV	(Note: Licensed to Fond du Lac.)	
Wausau	WMOW	4	Catchy Comedy, ABC on 4.2	(Note: Licensed to Crandon.)	
Wausau	WSAW-TV	7	CBS, MyNetworkTV/MeTV on 7.2, Fox on 7.3		
Wausau	WAOW	9	ABC		
Wausau	WJFW-TV	12	NBC	(Note: Licensed to Rhinelander.)	
Wausau	WHRM-TV	20	PBS		
Wausau	WYOW	34	The CW, Fox on 33.10, CBS on 7.10	(Note: Licensed to Eagle River.) (Note: Semi-satellite of WSAW.)	
Wausau	WLEF-TV	36	PBS	(Note: Licensed to Park Falls.)	
Wausau	WTPX-TV	46	Ion Television	(Note: Licensed to Antigo.)	
Duluth–Superior	KDLH	3	The CW	(Note: Licensed to Duluth, Minnesota.)	
Duluth–Superior	KBJR-TV	6	NBC, CBS on 6.2, MyNetworkTV/Heroes & Icons on 6.3	(Note: Licensed to Superior.)	
Duluth–Superior	WDSE	8	PBS		
Duluth–Superior	WDIO-DT	10	ABC		
Duluth–Superior	KQDS-TV	21	Fox		
Duluth–Superior	KCWV	27	TCT		

== Low-power ==
Low-power television stations in Wisconsin
Media market	Station	Channel	Primary affiliation(s)	Notes	Refs
Eau Claire–La Crosse	WECX-LD	14	The CW		
Eau Claire–La Crosse	W26FG-D	26	[Blank]		
Eau Claire–La Crosse	WZEO-LD	26	Buzzr		
Eau Claire–La Crosse	W19DP-D	49	[Blank]		
Eau Claire–La Crosse	W23FC-D	53	Various		
Green Bay	K18NQ-D	18	[Blank]		
Green Bay	W30BU-D	30	dark		
Green Bay	WGBD-LD	49	Fubo Sports		
Madison	WZCK-LD	8	Various		
Madison	WMWI-LD	16	Purple TV	(Note: Licensed to Verona.)	
Madison	W22FK-D	22	[Blank]	(Note: Licensed to Baraboo.)	
Madison	W23BW-D	23	Various		
Madison	W25FT-D	25	[Blank]		
Madison	W36FN-D	36	[Blank]		
Madison	WMWD-LD	38	Daystar		
Milwaukee	W21EF-D	8	[Blank]		
Milwaukee	WWMW-LD	16	Purple TV		
Milwaukee	WMKE-CD	21	Various		
Milwaukee	WTAS-LD	23	One America Plus	(Note: Licensed to Waukesha.)	
Milwaukee	WTSJ-LD	38	Various		
Milwaukee	WBME-CD	41	MeTV		
Milwaukee	WYTU-LD	63	Telemundo		
Milwaukee	WDMW-LD	65	Daystar		
Wausau	WRJT-LD	28	Various		
Wausau	W35DM-D	31	3ABN	(Note: Licensed to Minoqua.)	
Wausau	WZAW-LD	33	Fox, The CW on 34.10		
Wausau	W36EI-D	36	[Blank]		

== Translators ==
Television station translators in Wisconsin
Media market	Station	Channel	Translating	Notes	Refs
Eau Claire–La Crosse	KQEG-CD	8	WKBT-DT	(Note: Licensed to La Crescent, Minnesota.)	
Eau Claire–La Crosse	W18FK-D	8	WKBT-DT	(Note: Licensed to Elk Mound.)	
Eau Claire–La Crosse	WPDR-LD	8	WKBT-DT	(Note: Licensed to Tomah.)	
Eau Claire–La Crosse	W33DH-D	14	WECX-LD		
Eau Claire–La Crosse	W34FC-D	14	WECX-LD		
Green Bay	WLWK-CD	22	WGBA-TV	(Note: Licensed to Sturgeon Bay.)	
Green Bay	W17DZ-D	38	WPNE-TV	(Note: Licensed to Sister Bay.)	
Madison	W29ET-D	20	WHRM-TV	(Note: Licensed to Coloma.)	
Wausau	W21DS-D	7	WSAW-TV	(Note: Dual-licensed to Vilas County and Sayner.)	
Wausau	W32CV-D	21	KQDS-TV	(Note: Licensed to Hurley.)	
Wausau	W27AU-D	27	WJFW		
Wausau	W26EE-D	30	WVCY-TV	(Note: Licensed to Wittenberg.)	
Wausau	W31EV-D	33	WZAW-LD		
~Cedar Rapids, IA	W16DU-D	31	WHLA-TV	(Note: Licensed to Bloomington.)	
~Marquette, MI	W30DZ-D	36	WLEF-TV	(Note: Licensed to Fence.)	
Duluth–Superior	W15EE-D	21	KQDS-TV	(Note: Licensed to Ashland.)	
Duluth–Superior	W31GH-D	21	KQDS-TV	(Note: Licensed to Hayward.)	
~Minneapolis–St. Paul, MN	W24CL-D	28	WHWC-TV	(Note: Licensed to Grantsburg.)	
~Minneapolis–St. Paul, MN	W19EN-D	28	WHWC-TV	(Note: Licensed to River Falls.)	

== Defunct ==
- KFIZ-TV Fond du Lac (1968–1972)
- WCAN-TV Milwaukee (1953–1955)
- WCGV-TV Milwaukee (1980–2018)
- WFXS-TV Wittenberg (1999–2015)
- WNAM-TV Neenah/Appleton/Menasha (1953–1955)
- WOSH-TV Oshkosh (1953–1954)
