= List of Movies! affiliates =

The following is a list of affiliates for Movies!, a digital subchannel network owned by Weigel Broadcasting.

== Affiliates ==
List of Movies! affiliates
Media market	State/District	Station	Channel
Montgomery	Alabama	WALE-LD	17.5
Anchorage	Alaska	KDMD	33.8
Phoenix	Arizona	KUTP	45.2
Bakersfield	California	KBFK-LP	34.2
Fresno	California	KVBC-LD	13.3
Los Angeles	California	KCOP-TV	13.3
Palm Springs	California	KMIR-TV	36.3
San Francisco–Oakland–San Jose	California	KTVU	2.3
Sacramento-Stockton–Modesto	California	KMAX-TV	31.5
Denver	Colorado	KREG-TV	3.5
Grand Junction	Colorado	K22JN-D	22.1
Hartford–New Haven	Connecticut	WHCT-LD	35.4
Washington	District of Columbia	WDCA	20.2
Gainesville	Florida	WOGX	51.2
Jacksonville	Florida	WCWJ	17.3
Miami–Fort Lauderdale	Florida	WBFS-TV	33.2
Orlando	Florida	WRBW	65.2
Panama City	Florida	WPFN-CD	22.2
Tampa–St. Petersburg	Florida	WTVT	13.2
West Palm Beach	Florida	WBWP-LD	19.4
Atlanta	Georgia	WAGA-TV	5.2
Macon	Georgia	WPGA-LD	50.6
Savannah	Georgia	WGCB	35.6
Toccoa	Georgia	WGTA	32.4
Chicago	Illinois	WFLD	32.2
Indianapolis	Indiana	WBXI-CD	47.4
South Bend	Indiana	WBND-LD	57.3
Louisville	Kentucky	WBKI	58.4
Baton Rouge	Louisiana	KPBN-LD	14.5
Carencro–Lafayette	Louisiana	KDCG-CD	22.4
Columbia–Monroe	Louisiana	KMLU	11.3
New Orleans	Louisiana	KNOV-CD	41.3
Shreveport	Louisiana	KTBS-TV	3.4
Baltimore	Maryland	WJZ-TV	13.6
Detroit	Michigan	WJBK	2.2
Grand Rapids–Muskegon	Michigan	WTLJ	54.5
Minneapolis–Saint Paul	Minnesota	WFTC	9.3
Osage Beach–Springfield	Missouri	KRFT-LD	8.10
St. Louis	Missouri	KNLC	24.4
Pahrump–Henderson–Las Vegas	Nevada	KPVM-LD	25.2
Albuquerque	New Mexico	KUPT-LD	16.1
Albany-Schenectady-Troy	New York	WNYA	51.2
Buffalo	New York	WBBZ-TV	67.8
New York City	New York	WNYW	5.2
Rochester	New York	WBGT-CD	46.7
Syracuse	New York	WTVU-CD	22.6
Utica	New York	WWDG-CD	12.6
Chapel Hill	North Carolina	WIRP-LD	27.7
Valley City–Fargo–Grand Forks	North Dakota	KRDK-TV	4.5
Cleveland	Ohio	WOCV-CD	35.4
Cincinnati	Ohio	WBQC-LD	25.7
Oklahoma City	Oklahoma	KOPX-TV	62.4
Okmulgee–Tulsa	Oklahoma	KTPX-TV	44.4
Philadelphia	Pennsylvania	WTXF-TV	29.2
Pittsburgh	Pennsylvania	WPKD-TV	19.4
Wilkes-Barre–Scranton	Pennsylvania	W09DJ-D	30.8
Honea Path	South Carolina	WWYA-LD	28.1
Bristol–Johnson City–Kingsport	Tennessee	WKPT-TV	19.6
Lebanon–Nashville	Tennessee	WJFB	44.5
Memphis	Tennessee	WNBA-LD	2.6
Amarillo	Texas	TBA	TBA
Austin	Texas	KTBC	7.2
Dallas-Fort Worth	Texas	KDFI	27.2
Houston	Texas	KTXH	20.2
Laredo	Texas	KLMV-LD	15.3
Lubbock	Texas	KLBB-LD	48.3
Odessa–Midland	Texas	KWWT	30.4
San Antonio	Texas	KSAT-TV	12.3
Victoria	Texas	KMOL-LD	17.2
Ogden–Salt Lake City	Utah	KCSG	8.7
Burlington	Vermont	WCAX-TV	3.2
Roanoke–Lynchburg	Virginia	WSLS-TV	10.5
Bellingham–Seattle-Tacoma	Washington	KVOS-TV	12.2
Eau Claire–La Crosse	Wisconsin	WEAU	13.4
Green Bay	Wisconsin	WMEI	31.5
Racine–Milwaukee	Wisconsin	WMLW-TV	49.2
Wausau	Wisconsin	WZAW-LD	55.3
