= Heartland Communications Group =

American local radio broadcasting company

Heartland Communications Group, LLC is a radio broadcasting company focused on operating groups of local radio stations in small midwestern markets. Currently, it owns eight radio stations and two FM Translators in Wisconsin. It has put together geographically adjacent clusters of market-leading radio stations.

In May 2010, former Armada Media CEO Jim Coursolle and his wife Diane, closed a purchase of a two-thirds interest in owner Heartland Communications, from Granite Equity Partners.

The current station portfolio includes:

- Ashland, Wisconsin
  - WATW AM 1400, Freedom Talk
  - WBSZ FM 93.3, Country
  - WJJH FM 96.7 & 102.3, Classic Rock
  - WNXR FM 107.3, Classic Hits
- Eagle River, Wisconsin
  - WERL (AM) 950 & 101.7, Freedom Talk
  - WRJO FM 94.5, Classic Hits
- Rhinelander, Wisconsin
  - WCYE FM 93.7, Country
  - WNWX FM 96.5, Hot A/C

Present headquarters for Heartland is located at 909 N. Railroad St., Eagle River, Wisconsin 54521.
