= WMEI =

Television station in Shawano, Wisconsin

- Shawano–Green Bay–Fox Cities, Wisconsin; United States
- City: Shawano, Wisconsin
- Channels: Digital: 31 (UHF); Virtual: 31
- Branding: MeTV Green Bay; Telemundo Wisconsin (31.6); Noticiero Telemundo Wisconsin (newscasts on 31.6)

Programming
- Affiliations: 31.1: MeTV; 31.6: Telemundo; for others, see § Subchannels

Ownership
- Owner: Weigel Broadcasting; (TV-49, Inc.)

History
- Founded: September 13, 2022
- First air date: June 20, 2024
- Call sign meaning: (Northeast) Wisconsin's MeTV (with the "I" transposed)

Technical information
- Licensing authority: FCC
- Facility ID: 776266
- ERP: 1,000 kW
- HAAT: 332.7 m (1,092 ft)
- Transmitter coordinates: 44°20′0.1″N 87°58′55.7″W
- Translator(s): W16EP-D 31 Oshkosh

Links
- Public license information: Public file; LMS
- Website: WMEI page on MeTV.com

WMEI (channel 31) is a television station licensed to Shawano, Wisconsin, United States. Owned by Weigel Broadcasting, the station serves as an outlet for the company's suite of over-the-air broadcast networks in the Green Bay–Fox Cities market, with its flagship network MeTV carried on its primary channel. WMEI's transmitter is located with that of WFRV-TV on Scray Hill southeast of Green Bay near Shirley, and the station is operated out of Weigel's Chicago headquarters, with no local presence in either Green Bay or Shawano.

== History ==
Channel 31 was originally allocated to Wittenberg, Wisconsin; though within Shawano County, which is assigned by Nielsen to the Green Bay market, it was instead utilized to provide a Fox affiliate for Wausau to the west, which originally had none and instead carried stations from Green Bay and Madison to provide the network to Wausau viewers due to a lack of demand for the network from its 1986 launch, nor any financially feasible way to launch an independent station at that time. The market's overall small population meant that NBC affiliate WJFW-TV (channel 12), based out of Rhinelander and the last station in the area to launch outside satellite stations before 1999, carried children's programming such as The Disney Afternoon on weekdays instead rather than programming for general audiences due to these issues unique to the market.

This changed in 1994 when Fox acquired the rights to carry NFC games from the National Football League. Wausau was long a secondary market for the Green Bay Packers, which had long aired their home contests on CBS affiliate WSAW-TV (channel 7) until the end of the 1993 season as part of the network's NFL package. ABC affiliate WAOW (channel 9) thus took a secondary affiliation with Fox from 1995 until 1999 to carry its NFL package, and some Fox content, and the network's rise through the last part of the 1990s finally brought forward a justification for a local Fox affiliate.

After receiving a waiver to serve the Wausau market instead with the allocation to Wittenberg, Davis Television signed on channel 55 as WFXS on December 1, 1999, as the market's Fox affiliate, though despite the expansion of network and syndicated programming, the station would struggle to remain on the air, including issues signing on its digital signal during the 2009 transition, where it was then allocated channel 31 as its permanent digital channel, though it continued to use virtual channel 55 through the remainder of its existence. Davis would sell WFXS's non-license assets to Gray Television (the current owner of WSAW-TV) on July 1, 2015, which moved to new low-power digital station WZAW-LD (channel 33), which took over WFXS's existing transmitter at a lower power. Davis Television would then turn the WFXS license into the FCC for cancellation on July 23, 2015. The channel 31 allocation would then be returned to the table of allotments for a future auction.

The FCC auctioned the Wittenberg allocation in the spring of 2022, with Weigel Broadcasting winning the auction and intending to relaunch it some time in 2024 as a Green Bay station in order to present a must-carry owned-and-operated station with main-channel carriage of MeTV, along with assured coverage of its other networks (MeTV Toons, H&I, and Start TV), once the station signed on the air, as Green Bay stations had begun to drop its networks due to preferential treatment of other station groups for their own networks developing over time. This became a priority for Weigel after WGBA-TV (channel 26) dropped MeTV shortly after its parent company acquired Ion Media, with that station and WACY-TV (channel 32) beginning to focus on carriage of its sister networks instead, though some of Weigel's networks continued to have carriage through subchannels of Gray's Green Bay station, WBAY-TV (channel 2). Weigel's affiliation agreement with that station for H&I expires in mid-November 2026, with Start TV scheduled depart the station at the end of February 2027.

In the summer of 2023, Weigel petitioned the FCC to relocate the city of license allocation east (while remaining in Shawano County) to the larger county seat of Shawano with a higher transmitter power, likely to allow the station to provide city-grade service to Shawano and Wittenberg from Scray's Hill, the main transmitter site for the Green Bay market, southeast of the city in the Town of Glenmore. In May 2024, the station was revealed to have a new callsign, WMEI, and the station launched on June 20, 2024. WMEI was the first full-power television station to sign on in Wisconsin in over 20 years.

In the 2024–25 season, WMEI, along with other Weigel stations in Wisconsin, began airing select Milwaukee Bucks games in simulcast with FanDuel Sports Network Wisconsin, replacing WBAY-DT3 as the team's partner the previous season, and as a sister station to Milwaukee Telemundo affiliate WYTU-LD (channel 63) simulcasting that station as a subchannel, also carries Spanish language coverage of Sunday Milwaukee Brewers home games and Green Bay Packers preseason games.

== Technical information ==
=== Subchannels ===
The station's signal is multiplexed:

Subchannels of WMEI
Subchannel	Res.	Short name	Programming
31.1	720p	MeTV	MeTV
31.2	480i	TOONS	MeTV Toons
31.3	480i	STORY	Story Television
31.4	480i	WEST	WEST
31.5	480i	MOVIES	Movies!
31.6	1080i	TLMNDO	Telemundo (WYTU-LD)
31.7	480i	CATCHY	Catchy Comedy
31.8	480i	DABL	Dabl
31.9	480i	MeTV+	MeTV+

Simulcast of subchannels of another station

In December 2024, WMEI launched Telemundo on channel 31.6, a simulcast of Weigel-owned WYTU-LD in Milwaukee, providing the market its first full-time Spanish language network over-the-air (WYTU has been available through Spectrum systems in the market for over a decade). The Weigel networks currently or previously airing as a part of the subchannel lineup of WBAY-TV began to transition to WMEI as their contracts expired, with Catchy Comedy moving to a new seventh WMEI subchannel as of April 1, 2025. Dabl (which had come under Weigel's operational control a year before) moved from a WCWF subchannel on August 1, 2025, and MeTV+ moved to a new ninth subchannel on September 30 with the launch of WEST.
