= WRJO =

- Eagle River, Wisconsin; United States
- Frequency: 94.5 MHz
- Branding: Classic Hits 94.5 WRJO

Programming
- Format: Classic hits
- Affiliations: Milwaukee Brewers Radio Network; Townhall News

Ownership
- Owner: Heartland Communications Group LLC
- Sister stations: WCYE, WERL, WNWX

History
- First air date: 1971 (as WERL-FM)
- Former call signs: WERL-FM (1971–1985)

Technical information
- Licensing authority: FCC
- Facility ID: 4908
- Class: C2
- ERP: 50,000 watts
- HAAT: 150 meters (490 ft)
- Transmitter coordinates: 46°9′57.00″N 89°21′57.00″W

Links
- Public license information: Public file; LMS
- Webcast: Listen Live
- Website: wrjo.com

WRJO (94.5 FM) is a radio station broadcasting a classic hits music format. Licensed to Eagle River, Wisconsin, United States. The station is currently owned by Heartland Communications Group LLC.

== History ==
The station went on the air in 1971 as WERL-FM. On April 5, 1985, the station changed its call sign to the current WRJO.

The WERL call sign remains on its AM station at 950 kHz.

WERL was a reference to "Werl (as in "Whirl")-Wide Radio", taken from its early logo in the 1960s and 1970s.

Before the oldies format, WRJO held a country music format with the nickname "Eagle Country".

WRJO became affiliated with the Milwaukee Brewers Radio Network taking the affiliation away from sister station WNWX "Mix 96" in Rhinelander.

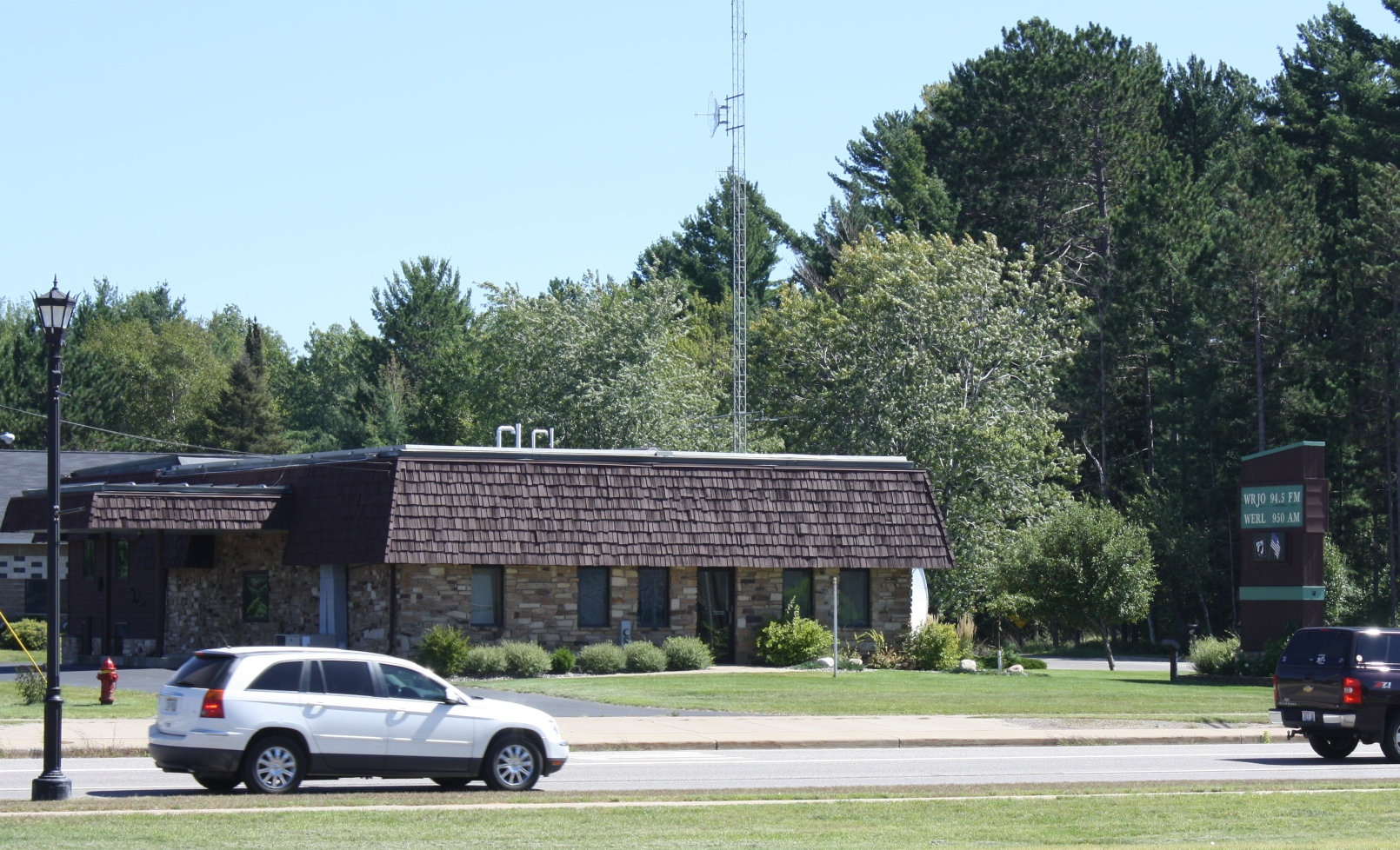
WRJO & WERL Studios
