= WISC-TV =

Television station in Madison, Wisconsin

- Madison, Wisconsin; United States
- Channels: Digital: 11 (VHF); Virtual: 3
- Branding: WISC-TV 3; News 3 Now; TVW (3.2)

Programming
- Affiliations: 3.1: CBS; 3.2: Independent with MyNetworkTV / CBS (alternate); for others, see § Subchannels

Ownership
- Owner: Morgan Murphy Media; (Television Wisconsin, Inc.)

History
- First air date: June 24, 1956
- Former channel numbers: Analog: 3 (VHF, 1956–2009); Digital: 50 (UHF, until 2019)
- Former affiliations: NTA (secondary, 1956–1961); UPN (secondary 1995–1999, 3.2 2002–2006); The WB (3.2, 2000–2002); Ion Television (3.3, 2017–2019)
- Call sign meaning: Wisconsin

Technical information
- Licensing authority: FCC
- Facility ID: 65143
- ERP: 46.9 kW
- HAAT: 469.2 m (1,539 ft)
- Transmitter coordinates: 43°3′21″N 89°32′6″W

Links
- Public license information: Public file; LMS
- Website: www.channel3000.com

WISC-TV (channel 3) is a television station in Madison, Wisconsin, United States, affiliated with CBS and MyNetworkTV. It is the flagship television property of locally based Morgan Murphy Media, which has owned the station since its inception. WISC-TV's studios are located on Raymond Road in Madison, and its transmitter is located on South Pleasant View Road in Madison's Junction Ridge neighborhood.

== History ==
Banner logo for "News 3" used by WISC-TV from 2001 to 2019; the "3" insignia had been in use since 1990.

WISC-TV first took to the airwaves on June 24, 1956, taking over Madison's CBS affiliation from WKOW-TV (which retained ABC affiliation). It was originally a sister station to WISC radio (1480 AM, now WLMV at 1480 and WOZN at 1670 AM). Both were owned by Morgan Murphy Stations, the broadcasting division of the Evening Telegram Company of Superior, Wisconsin. That company still owns channel 3 today, though it sold off its print interests in 2003 and moved its headquarters to Madison. It has since changed its trade name to Morgan Murphy Media.

Despite being the state's second largest market, Madison was a "doughnut" market as it was sandwiched between other markets where primary VHF signals were already assigned–Milwaukee (channels 4, 6, 10, and 12) to the east, Wausau–Rhinelander (channels 7, 9, and 12) and Green Bay (channels 2, 5, and 11) to the north, Chicago (channels 2, 5, 7, 9, and 11) to the southeast, Rockford (channel 13) to the south, and La Crosse–Eau Claire (channels 8 and 13) to the west. Having the market's only VHF signal gave channel 3 a distinct advantage—and market leadership—over UHF competitors WKOW and WMTV, a position that the station has enjoyed for much of its history, even after the advent of cable television put the competitors on equal footing. (WISC's former slogan, "Wisconsin's Leadership Station", played upon that advantage.)

WISC-TV has been affiliated with CBS since its launch, though it was also briefly affiliated with the NTA Film Network during the late 1950s. In January 1995, WISC-TV began maintaining a secondary affiliation with UPN, carrying tape-delayed overnight airings of the network's prime time programming following CBS's late-night lineup; this arrangement ended in July 1999, when Media Properties Inc. signed on Janesville-licensed WHPN-TV (channel 57, now Ion Television affiliate WIFS) as Madison's first full-time UPN outlet. (WISC would resume its relationship with UPN in 2002 through its cable/digital subchannel, TVW; see below.)

In 1998, WISC-TV partnered with Internet Broadcasting Systems to become the first TV station in the region, and one of the first in the country, to have a dedicated news website, "Channel 3000".

WISC-TV commemorated its 50th anniversary in June 2006, which merited a congratulatory mention by David Letterman on his Late Show broadcast of June 22, 2006 (its first program, he quipped, was Good Morning, Cheddar).

== TVW (WISC-DT2) ==
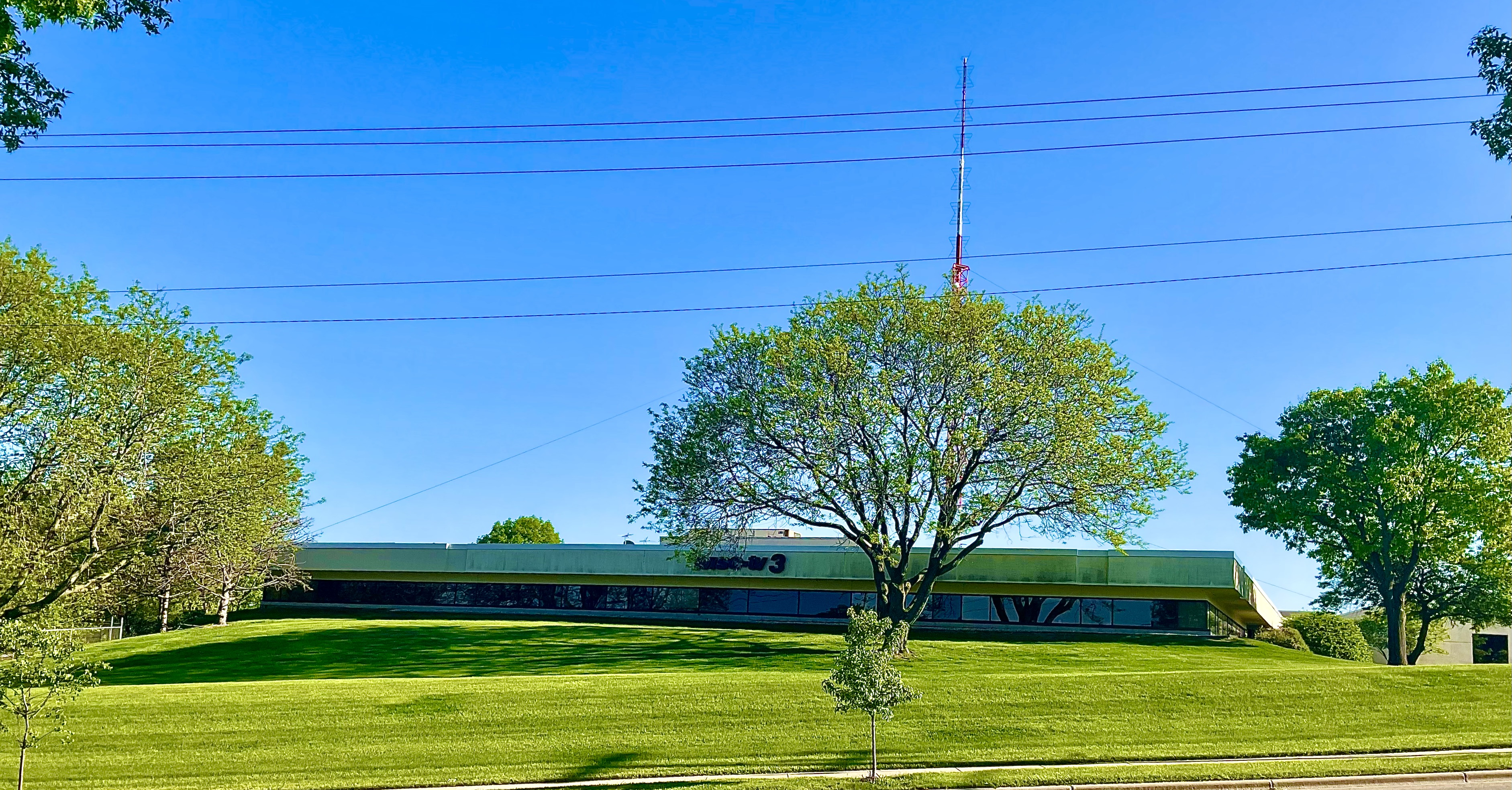
WISC-TV's studio in Madison (featuring the station's 1980s logo on its frontage), which it shares with the overall headquarters of Morgan Murphy Media, along with its web operation, Channel3000.

WISC-DT2, branded as "TVW", is the primary independent and secondary MyNetworkTV-affiliated second digital subchannel of WISC-TV. Over the air, it broadcasts in 720p high definition on channel 3.2.

=== History ===
The channel launched on January 1, 1996, as "WiSC2", a primarily cable-only general entertainment sister channel of WISC-TV. It was not initially available on Marcus Cable (acquired by Charter Communications in January 1999) in the immediate Madison area, instead being carried on cable systems serving some of the city's outlying suburbs and via a low-power broadcast transmitter, a situation that severely limited its potential audience early on. The channel maintained a format modeled after general entertainment independent stations, running a mix of syndicated sitcoms, drama series, talk shows and game shows; children's programming (including some off-network cartoons); a limited schedule of local news and community affairs programs; regional sporting events (including Milwaukee Bucks basketball games carried by the team's then-originating broadcast affiliate, WVTV); and an early-morning simulcast of Bloomberg Information Television (renamed Bloomberg Television in 1997).

In 1998, the channel—which was concurrently renamed the Television Wisconsin Network (TVW), named after the Murphy-owned licensee of WISC-TV, Television Wisconsin, Inc.—became the Madison-area affiliate of The WB; this made it one of only three local cable-only WB affiliates, alongside WT05 in Toledo, Ohio (now operating as a CW affiliate on a subchannel of local ABC affiliate WTVG), and "WRWB" in Rochester, New York (now operating as a CW affiliate on a subchannel of local ABC affiliate WHAM-TV), that operated independently from and predated the existence of the small-market WB 100+ Station Group launched by the network that September. Dating to the network's January 1995 launch, The WB had only been available locally on Marcus Cable and other local cable systems through the superstation feed of Chicago affiliate WGN-TV (relaunched as NewsNation in February 2021, and which dropped WB programming nationally in October 1999) and via Milwaukee affiliate WVTV (then available throughout Wisconsin as a regional superstation), which began to gradually let existing carriage agreements with cable providers outside of the Milwaukee DMA lapse after it affiliated with the network in May 1997. The affiliation was critical in getting Marcus/Charter to finally add TVW to its Madison-area lineup. TVW carried the full WB schedule (although it aired the network's Sunday night lineup on a one-hour delay), along with a mix of syndicated programs, Wisconsin Badgers sports, and locally produced programs produced by Channel 3 and Charter.

In September 2000, WISC—upon launching its digital signal on UHF channel 50—began providing a simulcast of TVW on digital subchannel 3.2, making it among the first permanent digital subchannels in modern American digital broadcast television and allowing over-the-air reception of the channel to the then-few area residents that had a digital-capable HDTV set. To reflect its channel position on Charter's Madison-area systems, TVW—which was retained as its official identification—began branding as "WB14" in September 2001. On August 26, 2002, WISC-DT2—which, accordingly, adopted "UPN14" as its branding—became the market's UPN affiliate as part of an affiliation swap with WHPN—which concurrently changed its calls to WBUW—that was tied to the April 2 sale of the latter to ACME Communications (a station group founded by WB co-founder and former network president Jamie Kellner), thus allowing area viewers who neither had a cable or satellite subscription nor an HDTV set (and therefore, lacked access to TVW's broadcast and cable feeds) to watch WB network programs for the first time.

On March 8, 2006, Morgan Murphy Media confirmed that WISC-DT2 would become the Madison-area charter affiliate of MyNetworkTV, developed as a joint venture between then-News Corporation subsidiaries Fox Television Stations and 20th Television (the former is now owned by Fox Corporation; the latter has since been integrated into Disney Media Distribution as a result of Disney's 2019 acquisition of most of 21st Century Fox's assets) and announced on February 22 to primarily serve as a network option for UPN and WB stations that were not chosen to affiliate with The CW (co-founded by their then-respective parents, CBS Corporation and Time Warner, to replace both networks). WISC-DT2—which changed its on-air branding to "My Madison TV" on August 7—officially joined MyNetworkTV upon its launch on September 5; however, it continued to air UPN prime time programming on a tape-delayed basis (from midnight to 2 a.m.) until that network ceased broadcasting on September 15. (WBUW switched to The CW when that network debuted on September 18, the day after The WB ceased operations.)

As a MyNetworkTV affiliate, along with syndicated programs, WISC-DT2 aired college sports from the Mid-American and Southeastern conferences (via ESPN Plus), occasional Badgers hockey broadcasts (via Wisconsin Public Television, which also aired statewide over Charter's "Xtra" service on channel 87 outside of the Madison market) and high school sports (under the "PrepMania" banner) as well as local programs including the music series Urban Theater and the sports panel discussion program Sidelines (which also aired in the Milwaukee and Green Bay markets on Time Warner Cable Sports 32/Spectrum Sports). On July 1, 2009, WISC-DT2 reverted to the former "TVW" brand, accompanied by new blue/white/black circular logo; the rebranding was meant to emphasize a connection to Madison and Wisconsin in the channel's programming. In February 2019, TVW acquired the rights to selected syndicated programs and most of the locally produced programming—including the Saturday night horror movie showcase Bordello of Horror and Talk Wisconsin (previously titled Talk of the Town before the show relocated)—that had been displaced from WIFS after it converted into an Ion Plus affiliate with little advanced notice to its viewers on February 1.

== Programming ==
Unlike most CBS affiliates, WISC is one of a handful of CBS affiliates to air paid programming on weekdays, providing an hour-long block of infomercials at 9 a.m. to compensate for the lack of available syndicated programming or a local newscast to fill that hour. WISC was home to ESPN Plus broadcasts of Wisconsin Badger sports before the syndicator's relationship with the Big Ten Conference ended in 2007. WISC also serves as an affiliate of the Chicago Bears pre-season television network.

WISC-DT2 is also designated by WISC to carry CBS network programs that the station must preempt to accommodate extended breaking news or severe weather coverage or special event programming on its main channel, and airs tape-delayed rebroadcasts of WISC's regularly scheduled weekday newscasts (usually) immediately after their initial telecast on channel 3.1 as well as hourly weather updates presented by the station's "First Warn Weather" team.

In 2024, WISC-TV aired 10 Milwaukee Bucks games as part of an agreement with Weigel Broadcasting and Bally Sports Wisconsin. These games originated from Weigel's Milwaukee CBS affiliate WDJT-TV and independent station WMLW-TV and utilize Bally Sports commentators and production personnel. Three games aired on the station's main CBS channel, with the remaining games on WISC-DT2.

=== News operation ===
WISC presently broadcasts 35 1/2 hours of local newscasts each week (with three hours each weekday and 2 1/2 hours each on Saturdays and Sundays). In addition to its normal morning, noon, 5, 6 and 10 p.m. newscasts, WISC airs News 3 Now Live at Four, a one-hour newscast which is largely devoted to non-headline news and features that focus on the community and the people of Madison, Dane County, and south-central Wisconsin. Live at Four originally aired at 5 p.m., but moved to 4 p.m. in October 2015 to expand to one hour.

In January 2004, WISC-TV began producing UPN14 News at Nine for TVW, a five-minute news update featuring local and national headlines as well as a brief weather segment. In September 2005, the program expanded into a half-hour broadcast (as News 3 at 9 on UPN14, subsequently revised to account for TVW/WISC-DT2's later branding changes); News 3 at 9 ended its seven-year run on December 31, 2011, after WISC entered into a news share arrangement with Fox affiliate WMSN-TV (channel 47) to assume production responsibilities for that station's 9 p.m. newscast (which had been produced by WKOW since its premiere in 1999) effective January 1, 2012.

On October 26, 2008, WISC-TV began producing all its newscasts in total high-definition video, becoming the first commercial TV station in Wisconsin to do so. The station had produced occasional news features in HD since the beginning of 2008. In April 2011, WISC began offering free on demand segments of their newscasts on the Roku digital video player.

On February 3, 2019, following CBS's telecast of Super Bowl LIII, WISC-TV introduced a new studio, and rebranded its newscasts from News 3 to News 3 Now, introducing a sonic and graphical design language that would be then rolled out across all Morgan Murphy Media stations; the new branding was intended to reflect the station's digital operations, as well as an emphasis on "engag[ing] deeper with our story content".

==== Notable former on-air staff ====
- Roger Grimsby
- Martin Kilcoyne (Sports)
- Matt Lepay (Sports)
- Curt Menefee (Sports)
- Alanna Rizzo (Sports)

== Technical information ==
=== Subchannels ===
The station's signal is multiplexed:

Subchannels of WISC-TV
Subchannel	Res.	Short name	Programming
3.1	1080i	WISC	CBS
3.2	720p	TVW	Independent with MyNetworkTV
3.3	480i	DABL	Dabl
3.4	480i	QVC	QVC
3.5	480i	HSN	HSN
3.6	480i	SCRIPPS	Grit

=== Analog-to-digital transition; spectrum reallocation ===
WISC-TV ended regular programming on its analog signal, over VHF channel 3, at 12:30 p.m. on February 17, 2009, the original target date on which full-power television stations in the United States were to transition from analog to digital broadcasts under federal mandate (which was later pushed back to June 12, 2009). The station's digital signal remained on its pre-transition UHF channel 50, using virtual channel 3.

The analog channel 3 continued to serve as a "nightlight", broadcasting a loop of digital transition information and instructions in addition to any local news programming and emergency information, until signing off for good the final week of March 2009.

On April 13, 2017, the results of the Federal Communications Commission (FCC)'s 2016 spectrum auction were announced, with Morgan Murphy successfully selling the UHF spectrum for WISC for just under $50 million. WISC would move their spectrum from UHF channel 50 to VHF, taking the former digital channel 11 position held by WMSN-TV before a return to UHF in November 2010.
