= Fox 33 =

Fox 33 may refer to one of the following television stations in the United States affiliated with the Fox Broadcasting Company:

== Current ==
- KDFX-CD in Palm Springs, California
- KMSS-TV in Shreveport, Louisiana
- WFXV in Utica, New York
- WZAW-LD in Wausau/Rhinelander, Wisconsin

== Former ==
- KDAF in Dallas/Fort Worth, Texas (1986–1995)
- WISE-DT2 in Fort Wayne, Indiana (2011–2013)
- WTVZ in Norfolk, Virginia (1986–1998)
