= Fox 47 =

Fox 47 may refer to one of the following television stations in the United States affiliated with the Fox Broadcasting Company:

== Current ==
- KXLT-TV in Rochester, Minnesota
- WEEV-LD in Evansville, Indiana
  - Translator for WEVV-TV Evansville, Indiana
- WMSN-TV in Madison, Wisconsin
- WSYM-TV in Lansing, Michigan

== Former ==
- K47DF/"KDF" (now K22JA-D) in Corpus Christi, Texas (1994–2008)
