= WERL =

- Eagle River, Wisconsin; United States
- Frequency: 950 kHz
- Branding: Freedom Talk 101.7 FM 950 AM

Programming
- Format: Talk radio
- Affiliations: Compass Media Networks; Premiere Networks; Westwood One

Ownership
- Owner: Heartland Comm. License, LLC
- Sister stations: WCYE, WNWX, WRJO

History
- First air date: May 23, 1961

Technical information
- Licensing authority: FCC
- Facility ID: 4907
- Class: D
- Power: 1,000 watts day 51 watts night
- Transmitter coordinates: 45°58′32.00″N 89°14′44.00″W
- Translator: 101.7 W269DZ (Eagle River)

Links
- Public license information: Public file; LMS
- Website: werlam.com

WERL (950 AM) is a radio station broadcasting a conservative talk radio format. Licensed to Eagle River, Wisconsin, United States. The station is currently owned by Heartland Comm. License, LLC and features programming from Compass Media Networks, Premiere Networks, and Westwood One.

WERL dropped its longtime Adult Standards format on July 1, 2010, in favor of the current "Freedom Talk" format.
