= Urban Theater =

- Genre: Live Music
- Starring: John Urban
- Country of origin: United States
- Original language: English

Production
- Producers: Jill Sommers (2003 - 2012), Tim Delay (2000 - 2003)
- Running time: 30 minutes
- Production company: TVW / WISC-TV

Original release
- Network: TVW / syndicated / internet
- Release: 2000

The Urban Theater was a half-hour syndicated television show which features musical performances recorded live in a production studio. The name is a play on the host's last name (John Urban). It premiered on July 3, 2000 and recorded its last show on December 6, 2012. It saw two distinct production concepts and has done a limited number of shows taped live on location.

== History ==
In 2000, a replacement show was needed for a Thursday timeslot on "TVW" in Madison, WI. John Urban, known for co-hosting a morning radio show on a local rock station accepted the invitation to host the show from the station's sales manager, Ralph Cohen. Production ended in December 2012.

== Live-on-air format ==
Initially, the show was part of the station's live "6:30 Show" concept. Each week day, TVW would air a live, interview show with viewer call ins at the start of "local prime time" (6:30pm, central time). "The 6:30 Show with John Urban" filled that Thursday slot. While guests included local media personalities, actors, comedians and musicians, performances during this incarnation were rare, as the logistics of staging a live performance live on the air were difficult for the production venue to overcome. Artists who performed did their songs in an acoustic guitar with vocal staging arrangement.

In 2001, the WB Network (TVW's network affiliation) wanted programming with broader appeal to lead-in to the start of their national prime time, causing the replacement of the locally produced "6:30 Shows" by nationally produced syndicated programming.

== Live-to-recording format ==
With the end of the show airing live, the producers were able to re-shape the show's production concept to fit within the limitations which had made it tantamount to impossible to do full group (band) performances. The revised logistics included:

- Bands are required to book an engineer to create the stereo (Left and Right) mix
- Bands are required to bring their own audio equipment (microphones, mic stands, cables/snakes, audio mixing console, effects rack, etc., usually supplied by the audio engineer)
- Production is held over two days, usually Wednesday and Thursday.
  - Wednesday: equipment load in and rehearsal
  - Thursday: recording
- Show is recorded out of order
  - All performance segments first
  - Interview segment is taped last, which would then be timed to fill out the remainder of the 22:26 of content
  - When the show airs, the interview segment airs as the second segment
    - Segment 1: Music
    - Segment 2: Interview
    - Segment 3: Music
    - Segment 4: Music

The show is produced live-to-recording in studio, with no audience nor post production editing. To date there have been four shows recorded on location. Location productions add the "energy" and visual element of a live audience, but add logistical problems (field production equipment, location availability, editing time) which raise production costs and therefore limit these opportunities. The bands/artists are not paid to be on the show; the opposite is generally true, as bands usually incur the cost of providing the audio engineer. Performers can justify this because of the exposure gained by performing on the television station as well as the re-distribution of the video and audio of the performances on the band's personal web sites offset this cost.

Bands are invited on the show after submitting a media kit to the producers for review.

Not all shows are musical performances, such as shows featuring:

- "The Prom Committee" a Madison-based improv comedy group, which performed three of their sketches
- The Wisconsin Film Festival, with clips from some of the featured the films.

Past shows are re-run during the week, with the "first run" on the weekend of the show which is recorded that week.
