= Stella, Wisconsin =

Town of Stella, Wisconsin
- Township
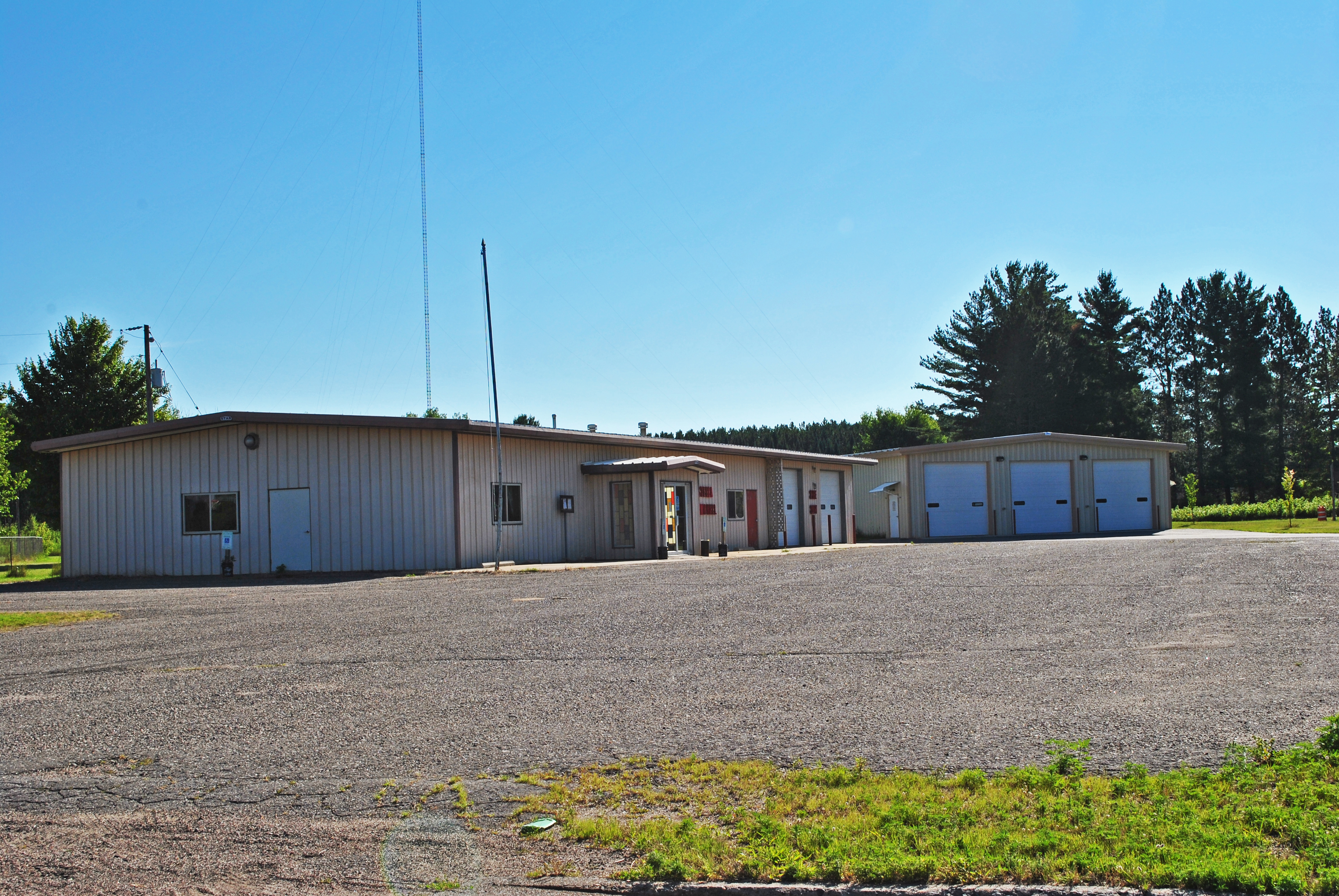
- Stella Town Hall

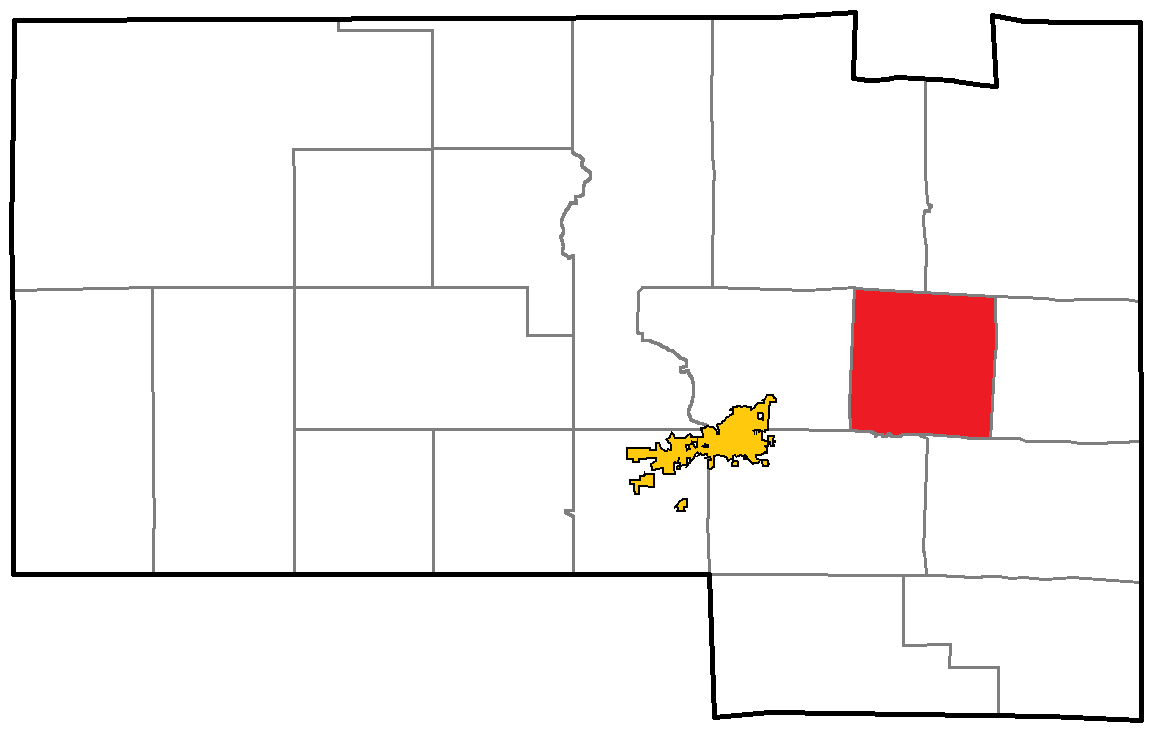
- Location of Stella, within Oneida County
- Coordinates: 45°40′45″N 89°15′16″W
- Country: United States
- State: Wisconsin
- County: Oneida

Area
  - Total: 37.3 sq mi (96.6 km^{2})
  - Land: 35.3 sq mi (91.5 km^{2})
  - Water: 2.0 sq mi (5.1 km^{2})
- Elevation: 1,611 ft (491 m)

Population (2020)
  - Total: 569
  - Density: 16.1/sq mi (6.22/km^{2})
- Time zone: UTC-6 (Central (CST))
  - Summer (DST): UTC-5 (CDT)
- Area codes: 715 & 534
- FIPS code: 55-76975
- GNIS feature ID: 1584216
- Website: https://townofstella.com/

Stella is a township in Oneida County, Wisconsin, United States. The population was 569 at the 2020 census. The unincorporated community of Starks is located within the Town of Stella.

== History ==
The township was named for Stella, a character mentioned in works by Jonathan Swift.

== Geography ==
According to the United States Census Bureau, the township has a total area of 37.3 square miles (96.6 km^{2}), of which 35.3 square miles (91.5 km^{2}) is land and 2.0 square miles (5.1 km^{2}) (5.26%) is water.

== Demographics ==
As of the census of 2000, there were 633 people, 236 households, and 188 families residing in the township. The population density was 17.9 people per square mile (6.9/km^{2}). There were 316 housing units at an average density of 8.9 per square mile (3.5/km^{2}). The racial makeup of the township was 97.63% White, 0.47% Native American, 0.16% Asian, 0.16% from other races, and 1.58% from two or more races. Hispanic or Latino of any race were 0.32% of the population.

There were 236 households, out of which 30.9% had children under the age of 18 living with them, 67.4% were married couples living together, 7.6% had a female householder with no husband present, and 20.3% were non-families. 14.4% of all households were made up of individuals, and 5.5% had someone living alone who was 65 years of age or older. The average household size was 2.65 and the average family size was 2.90.

In the township, the population was spread out, with 25.6% under the age of 18, 6.2% from 18 to 24, 27.2% from 25 to 44, 28.6% from 45 to 64, and 12.5% who were 65 years of age or older. The median age was 39 years. For every 100 females, there were 99.1 males. For every 100 females age 18 and over, there were 94.6 males.

The median income for a household in the township was $40,909, and the median income for a family was $46,375. Males had a median income of $36,375 versus $20,694 for females. The per capita income for the township was $16,712. About 5.1% of families and 8.3% of the population were below the poverty line, including 7.9% of those under age 18 and 3.9% of those age 65 or over.

== Transportation ==
The Rhinelander-Oneida County Airport (KRHI) serves the Town of Stella, the county and surrounding communities with both scheduled commercial jet service and general aviation services.
