= WNWX =

Radio station in Rhinelander, Wisconsin

- Rhinelander, Wisconsin; United States
- Broadcast area: Rhinelander, Wisconsin
- Frequency: 96.5 MHz
- Branding: Mix 96

Programming
- Format: Hot adult contemporary

Ownership
- Owner: Heartland Communications Group; (Heartland Comm. License, LLC)

History
- First air date: 2012 (as WHOH)
- Former call signs: WHOH (2012–2019)

Technical information
- Licensing authority: FCC
- Facility ID: 190431
- Class: C3
- ERP: 6,600 watts
- HAAT: 191 metres (627 ft)
- Transmitter coordinates: 45.6675°N 89.2081°W

Links
- Public license information: Public file; LMS
- Webcast: Listen Live
- Website: mix96northwoods.com

WNWX (96.5 FM) is a radio station licensed to serve the community of Rhinelander, Wisconsin. The station is owned by Heartland Communications Group, through licensee Heartland Comm. License, LLC. It airs a hot adult contemporary format. WNWX shares studios with its sister station WCYE on West Davenport Street in Downtown Rhinelander, and has transmitter facilities in Starks alongside NBC station WJFW-TV (channel 12).

The station was assigned the call sign WHOH by the Federal Communications Commission on August 31, 2012. The station changed its call sign to WNWX on April 1, 2019.
