= WFXS-DT =

Television station in Wittenberg, Wisconsin (1999–2015)

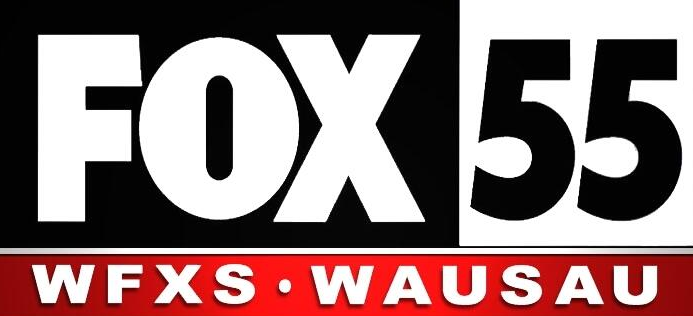
- Wittenberg–Wausau–; Rhinelander, Wisconsin; United States
- City: Wittenberg, Wisconsin
- Channels: Digital: 31 (UHF); Virtual: 55
- Branding: Fox 55

Programming
- Affiliations: Defunct

Ownership
- Owner: Davis Television, LLC; (Davis Television Wausau, LLC)

History
- First air date: December 1, 1999
- Last air date: July 1, 2015
- Former call signs: WFXS (1999–2009)
- Former channel numbers: Analog: 55 (UHF, 1999–2009)
- Former affiliations: Fox (1999–2015); UPN (secondary, 1999–2006)
- Call sign meaning: "Wisconsin's Fox Station"

Technical information
- Licensing authority: FCC
- Facility ID: 86204
- ERP: 685 kW
- HAAT: 325 m (1,066 ft)
- Transmitter coordinates: 45°3′21.5″N 89°27′57″W

Links
- Public license information: Public file; LMS

WFXS-DT (channel 55) was a television station licensed to Wittenberg, Wisconsin, United States, which served north-central Wisconsin, including Wausau and Rhinelander. Owned by Davis Television, LLC, it was most recently affiliated with the Fox network. WFXS-DT's studios were located on North 3rd Street in Wausau, and its transmitter was located northeast of Nutterville in unincorporated Marathon County.

Channel 55 went on the air in 1999 and served as Wausau's Fox affiliate for 16 years; Fox programming had previously been shown on a secondary basis by ABC affiliate WAOW since 1994. It was shut down after Gray Television acquired its programming and facilities and moved them to WZAW-LD, a low-power station which Gray could own alongside CBS affiliate WSAW-TV.

== History ==
WFXS signed on December 1, 1999, operating an analog signal on UHF channel 55. It was an affiliate of Fox from its start; before WFXS went on the air, most programming from the network was seen in north-central Wisconsin only via WLUK-TV from Green Bay on cable. Some Fox programming was also shown locally through a secondary affiliation on ABC affiliate WAOW (channel 9) from 1994 until WFXS began operations; this included the NFL on Fox following the launch of Fox Sports in 1994. Channel 55 was also a secondary affiliate of UPN. The station's start had been delayed a month due to antenna performance issues; a temporary antenna loaned by WNBC in New York City and intended for the World Trade Center was used to allow the station to start in a timely manner.

=== Transition to digital ===
Since it was granted an original construction permit after the Federal Communications Commission (FCC) finalized the digital television allotment plan on April 21, 1997, the station did not initially receive a companion channel for a digital television station, and was thus required to "flash-cut" to digital upon completing the transition to digital. WFXS installed a direct fiber optic line to Charter Communications' local headend for use by it and satellite providers to allow the services to carry a high definition signal. The FCC eventually allocated UHF channel 50 (later assigned to channel 31) to its digital service. WFXS was required to surrender analog channel 55 after its conversion, as that spectrum was sold to Qualcomm for use by its MediaFLO mobile video application.

Like all Wausau commercial stations, WFXS decided to go ahead with the February 17, 2009, conversion date despite the DTV Delay Act changing the actual switch date to June 12. At that time, the station's digital antenna was installed. However, the weather that week was bitterly cold and uncooperative. Several issues caused problems such as hydraulic fluid freezing on the heavy winch system (required to lift the new antenna), high winds, and the installation not going as planned as a result. These issues caused the new digital antenna to be damaged which had to be repaired elsewhere. Management of the station received cooperation of WAOW-TV to air WFXS' signal digitally until the antenna could be installed. It did so over the third digital subchannel of WAOW (and its satellite in Eagle River, WYOW) replacing the Retro Television Network (RTV).

The digital antenna was installed successfully on March 1 and put into service shortly thereafter without any problems. The simulcast on WAOW and WYOW continued for an additional day to make sure WFXS' transmitter was running well. The next day, both third digital subchannels of WAOW and WYOW began airing This TV. WFXS was back on-air with full-power on digital channel 31 featuring a 720p high definition broadcast. Overnight on March 3, 2009, a cooling line in the transmitter building burst causing heavy water damage to the building's floor and furnishings. The water also caused minor damage to WFXS' transmitter which had to be taken off-line. Once again, it received permission from WAOW/WYOW to broadcast over 9.3/34.3 while the damage was repaired.

On March 9, WFXS resumed normal digital operations and asked viewers to rescan digital televisions and converter boxes. The station was able to return the favor to WAOW a short time later when digital reception problems at WYOW prevented the signal from being received. WFXS temporarily added WAOW's signal to its own second subchannel in order to feed WAOW's signal to WYOW. WAOW added a microwave feed to the WYOW tower site to fix the problem permanently.

In April 2009, WFXS added a second digital subchannel to carry Untamed Sports TV; the station then added a third subchannel to return RTV to the Wausau airwaves in early-September 2009. The station changed its calls to WFXS-DT on December 15, 2009. In late-March 2011, Untamed Sports TV programming was replaced by MeTV (then a sister operation to This TV). WFXS-DT2 was also seen on Charter digital channel 965 while WFXS-DT3 could also be seen on Charter digital channel 964. Retro TV on 55.3 was replaced on October 1, 2014, with MeTV's sister network Movies!; WFXS was the last remaining affiliate of Retro TV in the state of Wisconsin, as all the other markets in the state dropped the network by the end of 2012.

=== Shutdown and replacement with WZAW-LD ===
On July 1, 2015, Gray Television (owner of CBS affiliate WSAW-TV, channel 7) bought WFXS' non-license assets and established a new low-power station (WZAW-LD channel 33). All of WFXS' program streams including WFXS' existing PSIP channel numbering was then moved to the low-powered outlet (though at the time, WFXS' transmitter facilities were merely transferred to the WZAW-LD license, with its transmitter power reduced to meet the low-power license requirements and its channels re-numbered to WZAW's channel 33). Subsequently, the WFXS license ceased broadcasting after nearly sixteen years on-the-air on July 1 at 11:59 p.m., and its studios on North 3rd Street were shut down. In consenting to the interference that would be caused by WZAW operating under special temporary authority on channel 31 (the same RF channel as WFXS) rather than its licensed channel 33, Davis Television stated that it would return the WFXS license to the FCC for cancellation following the sale; the license was canceled on July 23, 2015.

=== Fate of channel allocation ===
The former channel 31 allocation for Wittenberg was put up for auction in the spring of 2022, with Weigel Broadcasting winning the auction and intending to relaunch it some time in 2024 as a Green Bay station and possibly also serving Wausau and angling for pay-TV carriage in both markets, assuring full coverage for their subchannel networks, including MeTV, MeTV Toons, H&I, and Start TV, once the station signs on the air.

In the summer of 2023, Weigel petitioned the FCC to relocate the city of license allocation east (while remaining in Shawano County) to the larger county seat of Shawano with a higher transmitter power, likely to allow the station to provide city-grade service to Shawano and Wittenberg from Scray's Hill, the main transmitter site for the Green Bay market, southeast of the city in the Town of Glenmore. In May 2024, the station was revealed to have a new callsign, WMEI, and the station launched on June 20, 2024.

== Newscasts ==
In April 2001, WFXS established a news share agreement with WAOW (owned by Quincy Newspapers), resulting in the establishment of a half-hour 9 p.m. newscast on weeknights produced from the WAOW studios. It was joined in 2012 by a weekday morning newscast produced by WAOW, the 7 a.m. Fox 55 This Morning, in 2012.

Both of the WFXS newscasts maintained a separate music package and graphics scheme from WAOW. The broadcasts originated from WAOW's primary set at its studios (on Grand Avenue/US 51 in Wausau) but with unique duratrans indicating the Fox-branded shows. On June 19, 2011, WAOW became the market's second television outlet to upgrade local news to high definition level. Included in the change was a redesigned set and updated graphics scheme. WFXS did not transition its newscasts to HD until 2012. On July 1, 2015, concurrent with the Fox affiliation moving to WZAW, both of the WAOW-produced newscasts were cancelled after the news share arrangement was terminated; WAOW eventually re-launched the newscast within weeks at the same time on WAOW-DT2 for their CW subchannel.

== Subchannels ==
The station's digital signal was multiplexed:

Subchannels of WFXS-DT
| Subchannel | Res. | Short name | Programming |
|---|---|---|---|
| 55.1 | 720p | WFXS-HD | Main WFXS-DT programming / Fox |
| 55.2 | 480i | MeTV | MeTV (4:3) |
| 55.3 | 480i | RTV | Movies! (4:3) |
