= WCYE =

- Three Lakes, Wisconsin; United States
- Broadcast area: Rhinelander, Wisconsin
- Frequency: 93.7 MHz
- Branding: Coyote 93.7

Programming
- Format: Country
- Affiliations: Compass Media Networks; Premiere Networks; Packers Radio Network

Ownership
- Owner: Jim and Diane Coursolle; (Heartland Comm. License, LLC)
- Sister stations: WERL, WNWX, WRJO

History
- First air date: July 1994 (as WAIW)
- Former call signs: WAIW (7/94-9/94); WHTD (1994–1999); WLSL (1999–2008)
- Call sign meaning: CoYotE

Technical information
- Licensing authority: FCC
- Facility ID: 49802
- Class: C1
- ERP: 100,000 watts
- HAAT: 124 meters (407 ft)
- Transmitter coordinates: 45°46′30″N 89°14′55″W

Links
- Public license information: Public file; LMS
- Webcast: Listen Live
- Website: coyote937.com

WCYE (93.7 FM, "Coyote 93.7") is a radio station licensed to serve Three Lakes, Wisconsin, United States. The station is owned by Jim and Diane Coursolle's Heartland Communications Group and the broadcast license is held by Heartland Comm. License, LLC. The station shares studios with WNWX WRJO and WERL on North Railroad Street in Eagle River, and its transmitter is located along Thunder Lake Road between Sugar Camp and Three Lakes.

WCYE broadcasts a country music format.

The station was assigned the call sign WCYE by the Federal Communications Commission on March 13, 2008.
