= WMSN-TV =

Television station in Madison, Wisconsin

- Madison, Wisconsin; United States
- Channels: Digital: 18 (UHF); Virtual: 47
- Branding: Fox 47

Programming
- Affiliations: 47.1: Fox; for others, see § Subchannels

Ownership
- Owner: Sinclair Broadcast Group; (WMSN Licensee, LLC)

History
- Founded: December 8, 1983
- First air date: June 8, 1986
- Former channel numbers: Analog: 47 (UHF, 1986–2009); Digital: 11 (VHF, 2001–2010), 49 (UHF, 2010–2019)
- Former affiliations: Independent (June–October 1986)
- Call sign meaning: Madison (MSN is also the IATA code for Dane County Regional Airport)

Technical information
- Licensing authority: FCC
- Facility ID: 10221
- ERP: 440 kW
- HAAT: 450 m (1,476 ft)
- Transmitter coordinates: 43°3′21″N 89°32′6″W

Links
- Public license information: Public file; LMS
- Website: Official website

WMSN-TV (channel 47) is a television station in Madison, Wisconsin, United States, affiliated with the Fox network. Owned by Sinclair Broadcast Group, the station has studios on Big Sky Drive on the west side of Madison, and its transmitter is located on South Pleasant View Road in the Junction Ridge neighborhood also on Madison's west side.

== History ==
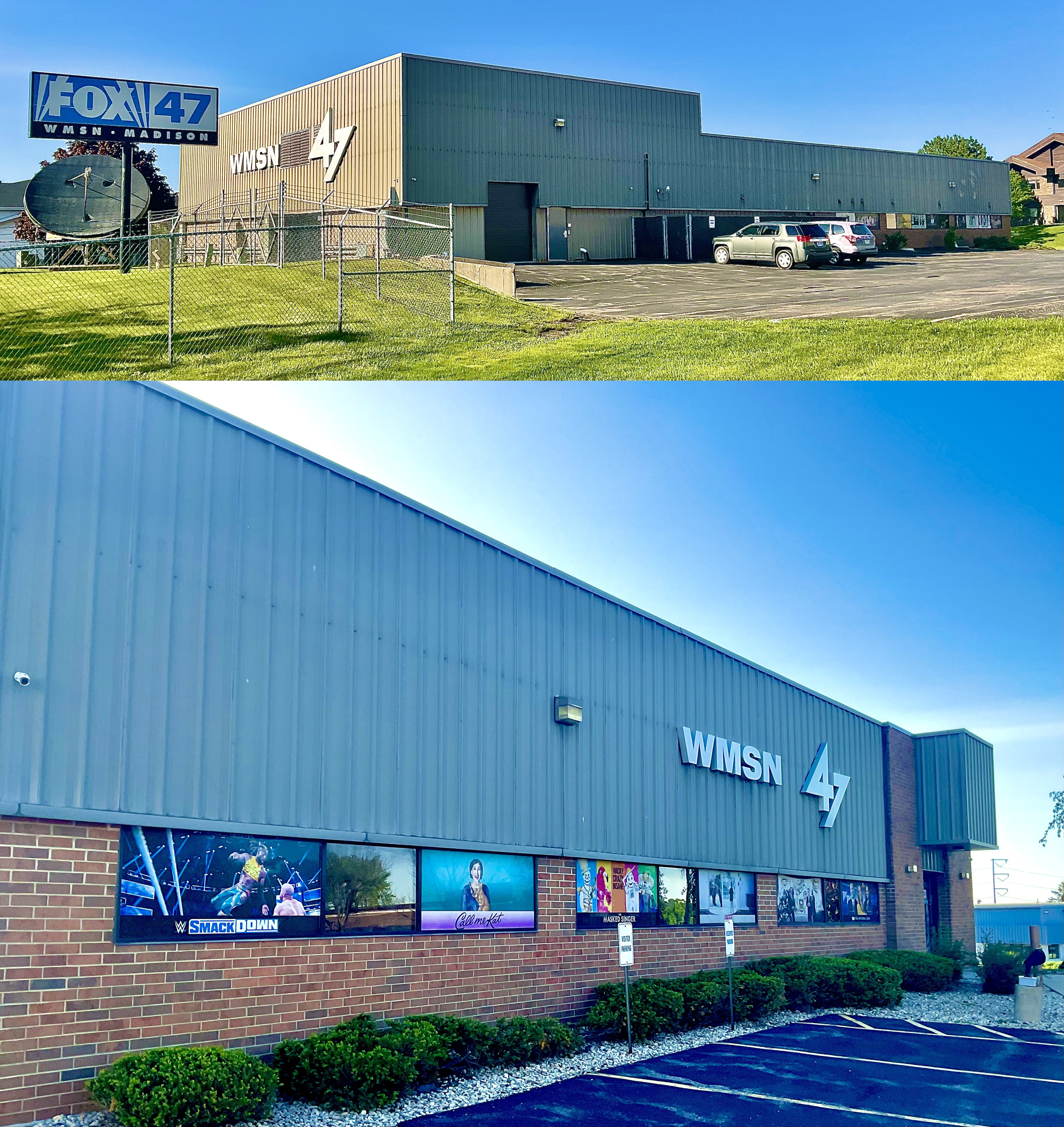
WMSN's studios in two photographs, featuring the frontage facing the Madison Beltline on top, and its actual front on Big Sky Drive below, along with the station's first logo in 1986 on the building, and its current logo on a lit monument sign.

WMSN-TV commenced broadcasting on June 8, 1986, airing on analog UHF channel 47. It was the first new commercial station to launch in Madison, Wisconsin, since WISC-TV signed on thirty years earlier. The station was originally owned by Channel 47 LP, a group of investors led by Ronald J. Koeppler. One of WMSN's earlier programs was Big Sky Theater, a Saturday night presentation of classic movies (mostly westerns) from the drive-in era. The program's name was an acknowledgement to the Big Sky Drive-In Theater, which shared a street with the newly built studios for WMSN; its next-door neighbor remains a movie theater, the Marcus Point Cinema.

After a few months as an independent, the station joined Fox as a charter affiliate on October 9, 1986. Since 1994, as a result of Fox's NFC football package, WMSN has been Madison's primary home for the Green Bay Packers; these broadcasts are routinely the highest-rated programs in the market during football season.

On April 1, 1996, Channel 47 LP filed to sell WMSN-TV to Sullivan Broadcasting, owners of the former Act III Broadcasting stations, for $26.5 million. Sullivan would sell its stations to Sinclair Broadcast Group two years later.

== Newscasts ==
In 1999, ABC affiliate WKOW (then owned by the Shockley Communications Corporation) entered into a news share agreement with WMSN, which resulted in Madison's first nightly prime time newscast, known as Fox 47 News at 9. The newscast, initially 35 minutes in length on weeknights and 30 minutes on weekends, was originally produced from a secondary set at WKOW's studios on Tokay Boulevard in Madison. The newscasts employed no WKOW on-air branding, instead using Sinclair's standard music-and-graphics packages. Although the newscasts featured appearances from additional WKOW personnel, WMSN maintained separate weeknight anchors that normally did not appear on WKOW except to fill-in when needed.

On January 1, 2012, WMSN's news share agreement with WKOW expired after nearly 13 years (WMSN general manager Kerry Johnson termed the split as a "business decision"). On that same date, WMSN began a new news outsourcing agreement with WISC-TV, the Morgan Murphy Media–owned CBS affiliate in Madison; as a result, WISC cancelled its own 9 p.m. weeknight newscast it had produced for its subchannel TVW, making Fox 47 News at 9 the only remaining prime time newscast in the Madison market until WMTV established its own 9 p.m. newscast on its CW-affiliated subchannel in November 2016. Mirroring its agreement with WKOW, Fox 47 News at 9 originates not from WMSN's studios but from WISC's Raymond Road studios, uses WISC's news staff (except the main news anchors), and employs studio backdrops and Sinclair's standard news graphics that help differentiate the newscasts from those on WISC. It was also during this period with WISC (in February 2016) that Fox 47 News at 9 would move to a full-hour time period each night.

In 2018, Sinclair required all of its television stations to air a message that called out "biased and fake news" and says "national media outlets are publishing these same fake stories without checking facts first." However, because WMSN's newscast is produced by WISC-TV pursuant to the above-mentioned news-share agreement, no such segment was produced for WMSN, and was disclaimed as such on WMSN's social media channels. WMSN began to carry the second evening hour of Sinclair's The National News Desk upon its debut in 2021, and now also carries the three-hour morning block of that same program.

== Technical information ==
=== Subchannels ===
The station's signal is multiplexed:

Subchannels of WMSN-TV
Subchannel	Res.	Short name	Programming
47.1	720p	WMSNFOX	Fox
47.2	480i	Comet	Comet
47.3	480i	Charge!	Charge!
47.4	480i	ROAR	Roar
47.5	480i	NEST	The Nest
47.6	480i	Antenna	Antenna TV

=== Analog-to-digital conversion ===
WMSN-TV shut down its analog signal, over UHF channel 47, on June 12, 2009, the official date on which full-power television stations in the United States transitioned from analog to digital broadcasts under federal mandate. The station's digital signal remained on its pre-transition VHF channel 11, using virtual channel 47. Since then, WMSN would relocate twice, to channel 49 in November 2010 and to channel 18 in October 2019.

In September 2010, WMSN-TV established its first digital subchannel, adding TheCoolTV music video network to subchannel 47.2. The subchannel would go dark in September 2012 at the expiration of Sinclair's carriage agreement with TheCoolTV. In July 2014, the channel was reactivated as an affiliate of GetTV, which would be replaced on October 31, 2015 by Sinclair-owned sci-fi network Comet.

When it relocated to physical channel 11 in 2010, WMSN would add a third subchannel, 47.3, with content from The Country Network, later known as ZUUS Country. That network would be replaced in 2014 by the action-oriented Grit network. Grit would be replaced on June 1, 2017, by another action network, Sinclair-owned Charge!. On that same date, a fourth subchannel, 47.4, was activated and affiliated with TBD.
