= Starks, Wisconsin =

Unincorporated community in Oneida County, Wisconsin, United States

- Unincorporated community
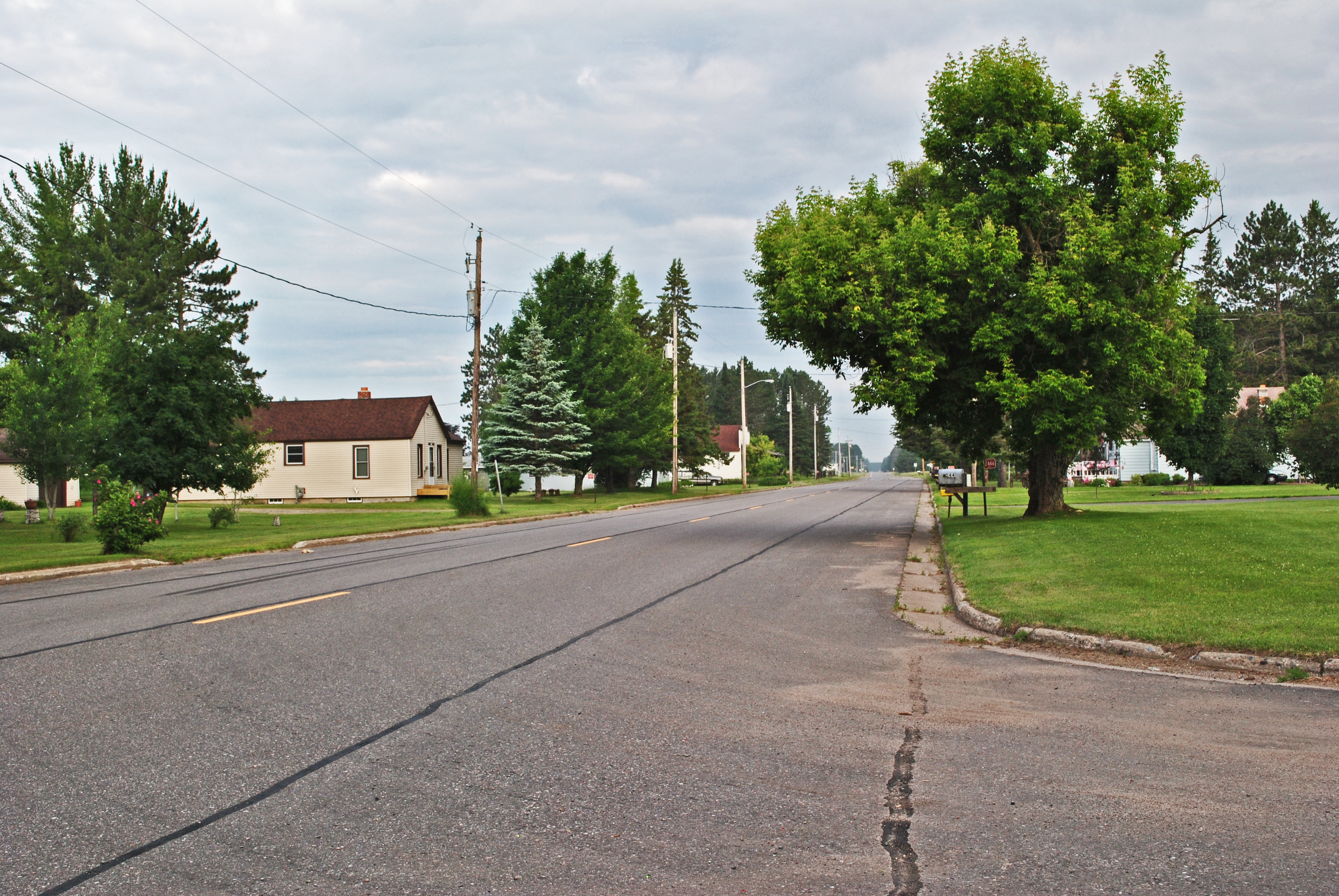
- Starks

- Location within Wisconsin Location within the United States
- Coordinates: 45°39′47″N 89°13′18″W
- Country: United States
- State: Wisconsin
- County: Oneida
- Elevation: 1,631 ft (497 m)
- Time zone: UTC-6 (Central (CST))
  - Summer (DST): UTC-5 (CDT)
- Area codes: 715 & 534
- GNIS feature ID: 1574816

Starks is an unincorporated community located in the town of Stella, Oneida County, Wisconsin, United States. Starks is located on County Highway C and the Canadian National Railway, 9.5 miles (15.3 km) east-northeast of Rhinelander.
