= WJFW-TV =

Television station in Rhinelander, Wisconsin

- Rhinelander–Wausau, Wisconsin; United States
- City: Rhinelander, Wisconsin
- Channels: Digital: 16 (UHF); Virtual: 12
- Branding: NBC 12; NewsWatch 12

Programming
- Affiliations: 12.1: NBC; for others, see § Technical information and subchannels

Ownership
- Owner: Rockfleet Broadcasting; (Northland Television, LLC)

History
- First air date: October 20, 1966
- Former call signs: WAEO-TV (1966–1986)
- Former channel numbers: Analog: 12 (VHF, 1966–2009)
- Call sign meaning: Jasper F. Williams (former owner)

Technical information
- Licensing authority: FCC
- Facility ID: 49699
- ERP: 269 kW
- HAAT: 362 m (1,188 ft)
- Transmitter coordinates: 45°40′3″N 89°12′29″W
- Translator(s): W27AU-D Wausau

Links
- Public license information: Public file; LMS
- Website: www.wjfw.com

WJFW-TV (channel 12) is a television station licensed to Rhinelander, Wisconsin, United States, serving the Wausau area as an affiliate of NBC. The station is owned by Rockfleet Broadcasting and maintains studios on County Road G (along WIS 17) in Rhinelander. WJFW-TV is broadcast from a primary transmitter in Starks, Wisconsin, and translator W27AU-D on Mosinee Hill, serving the immediate Wausau area.

Channel 12 went on the air as WAEO-TV on October 20, 1966. It was built by and named for Alvin E. O'Konski, a United States congressman and broadcaster. The station was off the air for nearly 10 months, from November 1968 to September 1969, after a small plane crashed into its tower at Starks, collapsing onto the studio building below; it rebuilt its studios in Rhinelander.

In 1979, WAEO-TV was sold to Seaway Communications in a "distress sale" to end a proceeding that challenged the station's broadcast license. It was the first such distress sale—in which a station facing an FCC proceeding was sold at less than market value to a minority-controlled buyer—and made WAEO-TV the first fully minority-owned network affiliate on the VHF band. The station's call letters were changed to WJFW-TV in 1986, a year after Seaway Communications principal Jasper F. Williams died in a plane crash. In the late 1980s, the station began a push to increase its presence in the Wausau area by opening a news bureau and the Mosinee Hill translator, though it continues to be perceived as a Northern Wisconsin station and lags well behind the two Wausau-based stations, WSAW-TV and WAOW, in local news ratings. Rockfleet Broadcasting acquired Seaway in 1998.

== History ==
=== Alvin O'Konski ownership ===
I spent $1,500 for an antenna at my house in Mercer. It was the biggest all around, and I would invite friends in for a Packer game. They'd have the ball on the one-yard line, and you should have heard my friends scream when the blasted thing faded out.

— Alvin O'Konski, on the state of television reception in northern Wisconsin

In 1963, Alvin E. O'Konski, a United States congressman, received a construction permit to build a new station at Hurley, Wisconsin, using channel 12, then allotted to Ironwood, Michigan. O'Konski had a track record in broadcasting. Until 1958, he owned Wausau radio station WOSA. In the 1950s, he had held and surrendered a permit for a Wausau TV station and asked the Federal Communications Commission (FCC) to assign channel 9 to Wausau.

He then changed his plans and asked the FCC to move the station to Rhinelander. Even at this point, he proposed to name the station WAEO-TV, using his initials. O'Konski claimed that resorts in the region were seeing declining bookings due to lack of local TV service and said that a station would stimulate the economically depressed Rhinelander area. Instead of simply shifting the Hurley construction permit to Rhinelander, in December 1964, the FCC moved the channel and instructed O'Konski to refile for it, which also allowed others to apply. The application was made in February 1965 for the channel, and it was granted on June 18.

WAEO-TV began broadcasting on October 20, 1966. The studios were located near the 1,710 feet (520 m) tower, one of the tallest in use at that time. From the start, WAEO-TV was an NBC affiliate. When Congress was not in session, O'Konski served as newsreader and made editorial comments during the program. Because of the station's northerly location, Wausau was on the fringe of its coverage area. Nearby Rib Mountain impeded clear reception of the station.

=== 1968 tower collapse and reconstruction ===
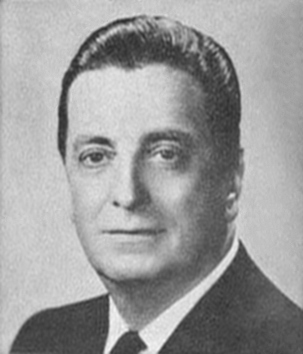
Alvin O'Konski built WAEO-TV, which carried his initials, and owned it until 1979.

On November 17, 1968, three Michigan deer hunters were flying home from a hunt in light snowfall when their small aircraft struck a guy wire of the WAEO-TV tower at Starks. The plane crashed into the tower, killing the men, and the tower collapsed to the ground. Most of the mast collapsed on the studios at the site, virtually destroying the building; a station engineer working inside broke his arm when the roof caved in. The mayor of Rhinelander, Al Taylor, invited channel 12 to set up temporary facilities at a city-owned building. More people could have been killed had a touring German boys' choir not canceled its plans to tape a program due to the weather or had O'Konski not been in Green Bay for a speaking engagement. In the wake of the collapse, state aviation officials called on federal authorities to expedite projects to improve the visibility of broadcasting towers.

O'Konski promised the station would be rebuilt, in a best-case scenario, within four months, depending on negotiations with the city to utilize the Memorial Building as well as insurance payouts. After the collapse, he determined that the studios should not be rebuilt at Starks and should instead be in Rhinelander proper. However, noting that the station's equipment was a total loss, O'Konski also said that if insurance undercovered his $1.5 million loss, he would consider not rebuilding WAEO-TV because of the capital expense required. In the end, O'Konski opted to reconstruct the station, in part convinced by community concern that far outweighed his station's meager ratings, which he called "a joke". In March 1969, he announced that the station would build a new tall tower and maximum-power facilities. While offices were set up in the Memorial Building, the studios would not be relocated there because there was no room to erect a 200-foot (61 m) tower to connect with the transmitter site. While construction was under way, he admitted in response to an investigation by The Milwaukee Journal that some of the station's employees were on his congressional payroll. The station also served as his congressional office, for which O'Konski received a monthly stipend; this was not the first time he had done this, as the WOSA studios in Wausau served as his office when he owned that station.

O'Konski received $1.19 million in insurance payouts as well as $156,000 contributed by 50,000 residents of the station's broadcast area who wished to see it return to the air. Channel 12 resumed broadcasting network programming on September 10, 1969, and local programming returned five days later. In addition to NBC programming, WAEO-TV aired a block of instructional programs for schools as well as Sesame Street in the early 1970s. At the time, there was no educational TV transmitter in the Wausau–Rhinelander area, and construction on the state educational network's WHRM-TV atop Rib Mountain was delayed.

In 1972, after redistricting, O'Konski was not re-elected to Congress because his district was merged with that of David Obey, who won election to serve the new district. O'Konski became the full-time manager of WAEO-TV.

=== Distress sale to Seaway Communications ===
In 1977, the FCC designated WAEO-TV's broadcast license for hearing over a series of issues including possible fraudulent billing and misrepresentations in program logs and reports. Another issue was "clipping", the insertion of local commercials over network commercials or programming. O'Konski chalked up the issues to two factors. He claimed that, due to Rhinelander's small size, "I have 22 employees doing the work of 75 which would be necessary on comparable stations" in larger markets. He added that most of them had never worked in television before. Nevertheless, he welcomed the hearing, saying he was glad the commission had "called (the issues) to our attention". The proceeding came at a time when O'Konski was attempting to sell the station to George N. Gillett Jr.; the commission ordered him to resolve the issue before moving forward with the deal. The proceeding ended under the first use of a new FCC policy, known as the "distress sale", which permitted stations facing hearings to be sold to qualified minority-owned groups at discount prices. Seaway Communications, Inc., a Chicago-based firm whose principals were Black, acquired WAEO-TV for $912,000 in a transaction approved in April 1979; an appraiser had assessed the station's fair market value at $1.5 million. The transaction was also historic in marking the first time that an entirely minority-owned group had owned a VHF network affiliate. This took place even though Rhinelander, like the rest of Northern Wisconsin, was heavily White; more than two decades later, the 2000 United States census found only 44 African-American residents in Rhinelander, which had a total population of 7,735.

Just days after Seaway took control on June 1, 1979, another tragedy took place at the WAEO-TV tower on June 5. A repainting was necessary by changes to marking and lighting standards for federal obstructions, and a tower crew was doing paint work and replacing a burnt-out beacon light on the mast. A steeplejack, intending to come down off the tower, fell from the top of the tower to his death. Tower lighting regulations continued to be a point of contention for the station. The Wisconsin Department of Transportation ordered the station to install high-intensity flashing lights for use during daylight hours, which Seaway rebuffed, claiming its mast was grandfathered when the Federal Aviation Administration adopted new tower lighting standards. The new lights were eventually installed by Seaway in 1983.

Seaway Communications founder Jasper F. Williams Sr., a Chicago obstetrician and gynecologist, died in a small plane crash near Bloomfield, Indiana, on April 15, 1985; his son and his son's girlfriend were also killed. In memory of Williams, WAEO-TV changed its call sign to WJFW-TV on October 5, 1986.

=== Tuning in to Wausau ===
Beginning in the mid-1980s, Seaway began beefing up channel 12's undersized local news operation and investing to increase its market share in the Wausau area, the most populous part of its potential market. Viewers considered it a Rhinelander station; though this resulted in strong viewership in that area, it was a distant third place in local ratings. When all three stations aired news at 10 p.m., channel 12 attracted 6 percent of the audience, WAOW drew 29 percent, and WSAW-TV led with a 45 percent share. WJFW-TV opened a two-person news bureau in Wausau with the ability to insert live segments into channel 12's newscasts. The news department needed more staffing. As late as 1982, it consisted of one person: Mike Michalak, who reported and presented the news, weather, and sports. The news staff grew to seven people by 1986, still half of the 15-member news department at WAOW. Even after opening the Wausau news bureau, residents sometimes forgot WJFW existed: in 1989, three years after the bureau was set up, one of the Wausau reporters recalled someone saying, "Channel 12, is that out of Milwaukee?"

On May 10, 1989, WJFW-TV activated translator W27AU, with its transmitter on Mosinee Hill. The 1,000-watt repeater served to improve the station's signal in Wausau and extend it to areas south of the city that previously were unserved by channel 12 from its more northerly location. After the 1992 Cable Act reintroduced must-carry policies, WJFW-TV invoked them to appear on cable in Wisconsin Rapids for the first time; previously, the cable company there offered WEAU from Eau Claire and WLUK-TV from Green Bay as its NBC affiliates.

=== Rockfleet Broadcasting ownership ===
In 1998, Seaway Communications, which owned WJFW-TV and WVII-TV in Bangor, Maine, merged with Rockfleet Broadcasting. Rockfleet was set up by two men from New York state, Joseph Fuchs and Robert Farrow, as an investment vehicle to buy TV stations. For a brief time in 1999, WJFW-TV broadcast the NFL on Fox. Until November 1999, there was no Fox affiliate in the market, and WAOW aired Fox's NFL games. That contract expired midway through the season in anticipation of WFXS (channel 55) beginning broadcasting from Wittenberg. WFXS soon signed on, taking with it the rights; its signal did not cover far northern Wisconsin, leaving fans without the ability to watch the Green Bay Packers.

In 2003, WJFW began airing a new weekly news program, Hmong News, produced in conjunction with the city of Wausau and the local public-access cable service. The program was set up to provide local news and community information to the large Hmong community in central Wisconsin, particularly elders who did not speak English; previously, only a Wisconsin Public Radio regional radio show was locally produced in the language. The program was born in part because some Hmong immigrants could not discern that the September 11 attacks were a real event and not another TV show. It featured local commercials, dubbed into Hmong; the advertising sales paid for the cost of airing the show on WJFW.

WJFW-TV ceased analog broadcasting late on February 16, 2009, a day before the original digital transition date for full-service TV stations. The Mosinee Hill translator converted from analog to digital service the next day.

In April 2020, Donald Trump's presidential campaign sued WJFW-TV for defamation over a political advertisement from Priorities USA Action it aired that the campaign believed to be false. The move came two months after the campaign filed three defamation suits against far larger news organizations—The New York Times, The Washington Post, and CNN. Even though other stations also aired the advertisement, only WJFW was sued. During the lawsuit, the affiliate groups of each of the Big Four networks, the Radio Television Digital News Association, and the Society of Professional Journalists filed briefs in support of WJFW. The lawsuit was never adjudicated, as it was dismissed by agreement of both parties following the election.

WJFW has long been a very distant third in the local TV ratings behind WSAW-TV and WAOW. This is because it has long been perceived as being focused on northern, not central, Wisconsin. In 2012, it invoked exclusivity rules to force Charter Communications to remove WEAU from the Stevens Point cable system; the Stevens Point Journal reported that some viewers wondered why WJFW was in their market.

== Technical information and subchannels ==
WJFW-TV is broadcast from a primary transmitter in Starks, Wisconsin, and translator W27AU-D on Mosinee Hill, serving the immediate Wausau area. The station's signal is multiplexed:

Subchannels of WJFW-TV and W27AU-D
Subchannel		Res.	Short name	Programming
WJFW-TV	W27AU-D	Res.	Short name	Programming
12.1	27.1	1080i	WJFW-DT	NBC
12.2	27.2	480i	COZI	Cozi TV
12.3	27.3	480i	Antenna	Antenna TV
12.5	27.5	480i	HSN	Shop LC
12.5	27.5	480i	QVC	QVC
12.6	27.6	480i	MovieSp	MovieSphere Gold

== See also ==
- Channel 12 virtual TV stations in the United States
- Channel 16 digital TV stations in the United States
- WFQX-TV/WFUP
