= WZAW-LD =

Television station in Wausau, Wisconsin

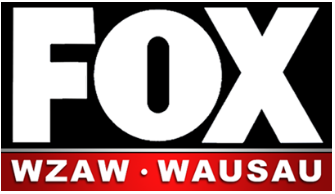
- Wausau, Wisconsin; United States
- Channels: Digital: 33 (UHF); Virtual: 33
- Branding: Fox WZAW

Programming
- Affiliations: 33.1: Fox; 34.10: CW+; for others, see § Subchannels

Ownership
- Owner: Gray Media; (Gray Television Licensee, LLC)
- Sister stations: WSAW-TV

History
- Founded: May 27, 2015
- First air date: July 1, 2015
- Former channel numbers: Digital: 31 (UHF, 2015−2016); Virtual: 55 (2015−2016)
- Call sign meaning: disambiguation of WSAW ("Z" added in honor of former news director Mark Zelich)

Technical information
- Licensing authority: FCC
- Facility ID: 183262
- Class: LD
- ERP: 15 kW
- HAAT: 313 m (1,027 ft)
- Transmitter coordinates: 45°3′22″N 89°27′54″W
- Translator(s): WSAW-DT 7.3 (VHF) Wausau; 7.3 (UHF) W21DS-D3 Sayner/Vilas County, WI; W31EV-D Stevens Point, WI

Links
- Public license information: LMS

WZAW-LD (channel 33) is a low-power television station in Wausau, Wisconsin, United States, affiliated with the Fox network. It is owned by Gray Media alongside CBS/MyNetworkTV/CW+ affiliate WSAW-TV (channel 7). The two stations share studios on Grand Avenue/US 51 in Wausau; WZAW-LD's transmitter is located northeast of Nutterville in unincorporated Marathon County.

Since WZAW transmits at low-power, its signal does not reach Rhinelander or other areas to the north and east (such as Eagle River and Crandon), which would have caused complications, especially for Fox's broadcasts of NFL games, including games of the Green Bay Packers. Therefore, the station is simulcast on WSAW's third digital subchannel in 720p high definition to increase its over-the-air broadcasting radius. This signal broadcasts on channel 7.3 from a transmitter on Rib Mountain. It is also seen on WSAW's Sayner translator, W21DS-D3, which also maps to channel 7.3.

== History ==
On July 1, 2015, Gray Television bought the non-license assets of the market's previous Fox affiliate WFXS-DT (owned by Davis Television, LLC). Due to Federal Communications Commission (FCC) ownership restrictions, Gray established this new low-power station to become the new Fox affiliate. All of WFXS' program streams, including subchannels, were then 'moved' to WZAW, though the new station merely repurposed WFXS's former transmitter at the time, which then began to broadcast at a lower power meeting WZAW's license requirements.

Subsequently, WFXS ceased broadcasting after nearly sixteen years on-the-air and its studios on North 3rd Street in Wausau were shut down.

In consenting to the interference that would be caused by WZAW operating under special temporary authority using its former channel 31 transmitter (the same RF channel as WFXS) rather than its licensed channel 33, Davis Television stated that it would return the WFXS license to the FCC for cancellation following the sale. In August 2015, WSAW launched a prime time newscast on WZAW, WZAW News at 9. The half-hour broadcast offers direct competition to WAOW's thirty-minute, weeknight-only news airing at the same time on its Decades (formerly CW) digital subchannel.

In September 2016, WZAW moved from virtual channel 55 and RF channel 31 to RF and virtual channel 33. In 2017, its simulcast on WSAW-DT3 was upgraded to high definition to provide full-market access to Fox programming in HD.

On September 13, 2024, WZAW began operating translator station W31EV-D from a tower in Vesper, Wisconsin. The translator provides improved over-the-air coverage to Stevens Point, Plover, Wisconsin Rapids, Marshfield and surrounding areas.

== Subchannels ==
The station's signal is multiplexed:

Subchannels of WZAW-LD
Subchannel	Res.	Short name	Programming
33.1	720p	WZAW-HD	Fox
33.2	480i	MeTv	MeTV
33.3	480i	Movies!	Movies!
33.4	480i	H&I	Heroes & Icons
33.5	480i	StartTv	Start TV
34.10		CW	CW+ (WSAW-TV)

Simulcast of subchannels of another station

Nearby channel WRJT-LD, which also broadcasts on subchannels of 34, is not affiliated with WZAW or Gray Media.
