= Movies! =

American classic movie television network

- Type: Free-to-air television network (movies and television programs)
- Country: United States
- Broadcast area: 70.43% OTA coverage and streaming
- Headquarters: Chicago, Illinois

Programming
- Picture format: 480i (SDTV) (transmitted in either 16:9 widescreen or 4:3 letterbox)

Ownership
- Owner: Weigel Broadcasting
- Parent: Popcorn Entertainment, LLC
- Key people: Neal Sabin; (Vice Chairman, Weigel Broadcasting); Norman Shapiro; (President, Weigel Broadcasting)
- Sister channels: MeTV; MeTV+ MeTV Toons; Heroes & Icons; Catchy Comedy; Start TV; Story Television; WEST; Dabl

History
- Founded: January 28, 2013; 13 years ago
- Launched: May 27, 2013; 13 years ago

Links
- Website: moviestvnetwork.com

Availability

Terrestrial
- List of affiliates

Streaming media
- Service(s): Frndly TV, FuboTV, Philo

Movies! (also known as simply M!) is an American free-to-air television network owned and operated by Weigel Broadcasting that launched on January 28, 2013 . The network's programming emphasizes on feature films.

It is available in several markets through digital subchannel affiliations with free-to-air television stations, as well as through carriage on pay television providers through a local affiliate of the network. Movies! provides programming 24 hours a day and broadcasts in the 16:9 widescreen picture format, available in either standard definition or high definition depending on the station's preference.

Though the network does air commercials, it otherwise carries film edits without profanity and content that does not meet FCC guidelines, and refuses broadcast syndication cuts of films, with no time slot constraints. A notation in the Movies! title card stating no film alterations is aired at the beginning of every film broadcast. Short films are aired to line up films to the top of the hour when needed, and to fill out time for a film that runs short.

== Background ==
On January 28, 2013, Weigel Broadcasting announced the formation of Movies!, with an agreement with Fox Television Stations to add the channel on the subchannels of 17 Fox O&O stations. The new channel would launch on Memorial Day of that year. Movies! officially launched on May 27, 2013, at 8:10 a.m. Eastern Time, initially debuting on the subchannels of five Fox and 11 MyNetworkTV owned-and-operated stations owned by Fox Television Stations, and two stations owned by Weigel. Its programming was inaugurated by a ten-minute clip introducing the network, followed by the first film to be telecast on Movies!, the 1975 film Western Take a Hard Ride.

== Programming ==
=== Films ===
Described as presenting "a variety of theatrical motion pictures in a new, viewer and advertiser friendly format, not seen on broadcast television to date", films featured on Movies! as of April 2025 primarily consist of releases from Walt Disney Studios Motion Pictures, Warner Bros. Entertainment, Sony Pictures Entertainment and Shout! Studios, but the network also shows content from Paramount Skydance, Lionsgate Studios, and ReTV. The network's film roster concentrates mainly on classic films from the 1920s to the 1980s, though in recent years, films from the 1990s and select films from the 2000s and 2010s are also presented at times.

As of February 2025, Movies! broadcasts most of its movie presentations in thematic blocks including:

- "Mid-Century Movies!" – a Monday night double feature of films from the 1950s and 1960s;
- "Wild West Movies!" – an all-day Western movie marathon airing each Tuesday;
- "Noir to Die For" – an all-day marathon of noir films airing each Thursday;
- "Friday Night Frights" – a weekly prime time double-feature of horror and science fiction films;
- "Saturday Morning Movies!" – consisting of films from the Hopalong Cassidy, Laurel and Hardy and Blondie franchises;
- "Popcorn Movies!" – a matinée showcase of comedy films every Saturday;
- "Definitive Movies!" – a Saturday prime time showcase of notable film classics;
- "Sunday Night Noir" – a weekly quadruple-feature noir showcase;
- "Icon-a-Thon" – a spotlight of legendary actors (airing without a set schedule) showcasing four or five signature movies from throughout their career.

Movies! presents many of its features in their original aspect ratio (widescreen or full screen) whenever possible, which are either presented in the 16:9 or 4:3 letterboxed format depending on the affiliate's preference in transmitting the subchannel; scope films, however, are often reformatted from 2.35:1 to 1.85:1. Films that are broadcast on the network are edited for graphic profanity and inappropriate violent or sexual content, but are not edited for running times to fit in a set time block.

Start and end times for films airing on the network are influenced by a combination of the film's original running time and the commercial breaks inserted within the broadcast (the network limits the amount of advertising featured during its programming to twelve minutes per hour), with airtimes for films varying between the conventional top-and-bottom-of-the-hour scheduling (e.g., 6:30 a.m. or 8:00 p.m.) and incremental five-minute margins (e.g., 2:10 p.m. or 3:55 a.m.) that more closely mirror the scheduling structures of premium cable channels than other advertiser-supported networks (this scheduling format, which still results in a particular film's running time to be somewhat longer than the original runtime of its theatrical release depending on the content edits, was replicated by GetTV from its launch in February 2014 until it began converting into a general entertainment format in 2017). The network does not display persistent on-screen logo bugs during its programming, outside of customary 15-second identifications shown after each commercial break promoting the program being aired (usually accompanied by the film's release year).

=== Children's programming ===
In order to meet requirements imposed by the Federal Communications Commission on the amount of educational programming content that a broadcast station must air each week, Movies! airs a three-hour block of children's programs that were originally distributed for syndication on Sunday mornings supplied by Storrs Media/Telco Productions (currently featuring Dog Tales Classics, Getting Green and Made in Hollywood: Teen Edition). This allows its affiliates to carry the network's full schedule without having to purchase E/I programming from the syndication market to comply with the rules.

== Affiliates ==
As of July 2014, Movies! has current or pending affiliation agreements with television stations in 43 media markets encompassing 22 states and the District of Columbia, covering approximately 49% of the United States. Weigel Broadcasting launched Movies! in markets served by a station owned-and-operated by the Fox Television Stations or its sister programming service MyNetworkTV. Not all of the Fox Television Stations outlets carried Movies! at launch, WJZY in Charlotte (which came under Fox ownership one month prior to the network's debut) did not begin carrying Movies! until July 1, 2014, due to an existing affiliation agreement with Antenna TV.

In Chicago—where Fox Television Stations and Weigel Broadcasting each own television stations—Fox-owned WFLD serves as that market's charter affiliate of the network, instead of one of Weigel's three stations in that market (WCIU-TV, WWME-CA and WMEU-CD). This makes Movies! the first Weigel-owned network in which the company's Chicago flagship stations do not serve as affiliates (WCIU formerly carried This TV under Weigel ownership before it moved to WGN-TV upon becoming part-owned by Tribune Broadcasting in November 2013, and MeTV is carried on WWME-CD and relayed a subchannel of WCIU). WBND-LD in South Bend, Indiana carries Movies! on its third digital subchannel; WMLW-TV in Milwaukee carried the network from its launch until August 4, 2014, when Movies! moved to a newly created secondary subchannel of ABC affiliate WISN-TV. Following the WISN deal, that station's owner Hearst Television signed affiliation agreements on a piecemeal basis to add Movies! to select stations, mainly those affiliated with networks other than ABC, during late 2014 and early 2015 (Hearst already carries sister network MeTV in a majority of the markets where it owns stations).

In addition to its carriage on the Fox- and Weigel-owned outlets at the network's launch, the network is also carried on the digital subchannels of television stations owned by other broadcasting companies. Soon after its launch, Movies! reached distribution agreements with several broadcasting groups to add the network on the subchannels of some of their stations. The first stations outside of the Fox and Weigel outlets to sign deals to carry the network were KFFV in Seattle, WLWC in Providence (both owned by OTA Broadcasting) and KPXJ in Shreveport (owned by KTBS, LLC) in October 2013, with the three stations adding the network between November 10 and December 10. The following month, in November 2013, Movies! signed affiliation agreements with nine stations owned by Bonten Media Group, Cocola Broadcasting and the Maranatha Broadcasting Company. Four additional stations (in Salt Lake City; Boise; Wausau; and Victoria, Texas), through deals with companies such as the Nexstar Broadcasting Group and Saga Communications, added the network between May and October 2014.

In June 2022, Frndly TV announced the planned addition of Movies! to their streaming lineup. However, after several months delay, Movies! was added on February 3, 2023.
