= WSAW-TV =

Television station in Wausau, Wisconsin

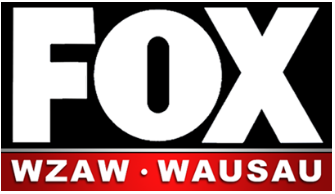
- Wausau, Wisconsin; United States
- Channels: Digital: 7 (VHF); Virtual: 7
- Branding: NewsChannel 7; MeTV Wausau (7.2); Fox WZAW (7.3); Central Wisconsin CW (7.4)

Programming
- Affiliations: 7.1: CBS; 7.2: MyNetworkTV/MeTV; 7.3: Fox; 7.4: CW+; for others, see § Subchannels

Ownership
- Owner: Gray Media; (Gray Television Licensee, LLC)

History
- First air date: October 24, 1954
- Former call signs: WSAU-TV (1954–1981)
- Former channel numbers: Analog: 7 (VHF, 1954–2009); Digital: 40 (UHF, until 2009); Translators: W57AR/W42DH Sayner/Vilas County, WI
- Former affiliations: DuMont (secondary, 1954–1956); ABC (secondary, 1954–1965); NBC (secondary, 1954–1966)
- Call sign meaning: phonetically short for "Wausau, Wisconsin"; also similar to original calls

Technical information
- Licensing authority: FCC
- Facility ID: 6867
- ERP: 72 kW
- HAAT: 373 m (1,224 ft)
- Transmitter coordinates: 44°55′14.2″N 89°41′28.7″W
- Translator(s): W21DS-D 21 (UHF) Sayner/Vilas County, WI

Links
- Public license information: Public file; LMS
- Website: www.wsaw.com

Satellite station
- WYOW
- Eagle River–Rhinelander, Wisconsin
- City: Eagle River, Wisconsin
- Channels: Digital: 28 (UHF); Virtual: 34

Programming
- Affiliations: 7.10: CBS; 33.10: Fox; 34.1: CW+

History
- First air date: January 4, 1997
- Former channel numbers: Analog: 34 (UHF, 1997–2009)
- Former affiliations: ABC (via WAOW, 1997–2021); Fox (NFL games, 1997–1999); CW+ (34.2, 2006−2021); Fox (34.3, via WFXS-DT, February−March 2009)
- Call sign meaning: disambiguation of former parent station WAOW

Technical information
- Facility ID: 77789
- ERP: 70 kW; 80 kW (application)
- HAAT: 163 m (535 ft)
- Transmitter coordinates: 45°46′29.9″N 89°14′56.1″W

Links
- Public license information: Public file; LMS

WSAW-TV (channel 7) is a television station in Wausau, Wisconsin, United States, affiliated with CBS, MyNetworkTV, and The CW Plus. It is owned by Gray Media alongside low-power Fox affiliate WZAW-LD (channel 33). The two stations share studios on Grand Avenue/US 51 in Wausau; WSAW-TV's transmitter is located on Rib Mountain.

To serve the Northwoods area of Northern Wisconsin, it operates a digital fill-in translator in Sayner (W21DS-D) that also covers Eagle River. This station broadcasts on UHF channel 21 (also mapping to virtual channel 7) from a transmitter on Razorback Road in unincorporated Vilas County (north of Sayner). The low-power repeater also serves the western portion of Michigan's Upper Peninsula although the broadcasting radius is limited to Marenisco and Watersmeet.

== History ==
The station launched on October 24, 1954, as WSAU-TV, a sister station to WSAU (1400 AM). It was originally owned by two groups who merged their applications in hearing: the radio station and the Wisconsin Valley Television Corporation, a consortium of North-Central Wisconsin newspapers that also included the Wausau Daily Record-Herald. Channel 7 originally operated from the Plumer Mansion, a Richardsonian Romanesque-style building, that was located on North 5th Street in Wausau and torn down in 1972 one year after the station moved to its current home.

The Plumer Mansion's castle-like exterior and a suit of armor displayed in the mansion inspired the station's graphic designer, Sid Kyler, to design a medieval-style blackletter "7" logo along with an accompanying cartoon mascot, the fully armored knight "Sir Seven". The logo and mascot served as representations of the station for several decades. Wisconsin Valley expanded with WMTV in Madison and radio station WKAU in Kaukauna. In 1965, Wisconsin Valley purchased its first media holding outside of the state, KVTV in Sioux City, Iowa; as a consequence of doing business in other states, the firm renamed itself Forward Communications in January 1967.

Forward sold off WSAU (550 AM) and WIFC in 1980. Since the radio station retained the WSAU call sign, Forward immediately applied to change channel 7's call sign to the similar-sounding WSAW-TV. The WSAW-TV call sign became effective on March 8, 1981.

Channel 7 has been affiliated with CBS since its beginning although the station did have secondary affiliations with DuMont (until that network expired in 1956), ABC (until WAOW signed-on in 1965), and NBC (until WAEO [now WJFW-TV] launched in 1966). On September 5, 2006, WSAW added MyNetworkTV to a second digital subchannel.

WSAW-TV shut down its analog signal, over VHF channel 7, at 11:55 pm on February 17, 2009, the original target date on which full-power television stations in the United States were to transition from analog to digital broadcasts under federal mandate (which was later pushed back to June 12, 2009); the station concluded its analog broadcasts with a sign-off message from Sir Seven. The station's digital signal relocated from its pre-transition UHF channel 40 to its analog era VHF channel 7. On April 2, 2011, WSAW became the first station in the market to broadcast local newscast in high definition. With the switch to HD came a revamp of their news set and new graphics, along with a return of Sir Seven as the station's mascot in a newly CGI-rendered form.

On July 1, 2015, Gray Television bought the non-license assets of the market's Fox affiliate WFXS-DT (channel 55) from Davis Television. Due to Federal Communications Commission (FCC) ownership restrictions, a new low-power station–WZAW-LD (channel 33)–was established to become the area's Fox affiliate. All of WFXS's program streams including WFXS's existing virtual channel numbering were then moved to WZAW. Subsequently, WFXS ceased broadcasting after nearly sixteen years on-the-air and its studios on North 3rd Street in Wausau were shut down.

In consenting to the interference that would be caused by WZAW operating under special temporary authority on channel 31 (the same RF channel as WFXS) rather than its licensed channel 33, Davis Television stated that it would return the WFXS license to the FCC for cancellation following the sale. In August 2015, WSAW launched a prime time newscast on the Fox outlet known as WZAW News at 9. This half-hour broadcast offers direct competition to WAOW's thirty-minute, weeknight-only news airing at the same time on its CW digital subchannel (which aired on WFXS before July 1, 2015).

On October 1, 2015, the station began using its new studio. It was the first upgrade in a decade and took months to finish. The new studio includes two new state-of-the art sets: one each for WSAW and WZAW. Eventually, the WZAW-LD simulcast on WSAW's third subchannel was upgraded to high definition to provide full-market access to Fox programming in HD.

On February 1, 2021, Gray announced that they would purchase Quincy Media's radio and TV properties for $925 million. At the time, Quincy owned WAOW in the market, so Gray had agreed to divest WAOW and its Wisconsin sister stations to Allen Media Group for $380 million on April 29 in order to satisfy FCC requirements. WSAW added The CW as a subchannel on August 2, 2021.

== News operation ==
WSAW presently broadcasts 22 1/2 hours of locally produced newscasts each week (with 4 1/2 hours each weekday, and two hours each on Saturdays and Sundays).

== Technical information ==
The stations' signals are multiplexed:

Subchannels of WSAW-TV
Subchannel	Res.	Short name	Programming
7.1	1080i	CBS	CBS
7.2	480i	MeTV+	MyNetworkTV/MeTV
7.3	720p	FOX	Fox (WZAW-LD)
7.4	480i	CW	CW+ (WYOW)
7.5	480i	Quest	Quest
7.6	480i	Outlaw	Outlaw

Simulcast of subchannels of another station

Subchannels of WYOW
Subchannel	Res.	Short name	Programming
7.10	1080i	WSAW-DT	CBS (WSAW-TV)
33.10	720p	Fox	Fox (WZAW-LD)
34.1	720p	WYOW-DT	The CW Plus

Simulcast of subchannels of another station

=== Translators ===
City of license	Callsign	Channel	ERP	HAAT	Facility ID	Transmitter coordinates
Sayner	W21DS-D	21	15 kW	138 m (453 ft)	167156	46°01′55.0″N 89°31′49.0″W
